= List of Baccharis species =

List of Baccharis species — in the flowering plant family Asteraceae.

== Species ==
Accepted Species:

- Baccharis acaulis
- Baccharis alamosana
- Baccharis albida
- Baccharis albilanosa
- Baccharis alboffii
- Baccharis aliena
- Baccharis aliens
- Baccharis alleluia
- Baccharis alnifolia
- Baccharis alpestris
- Baccharis alpina
- Baccharis altimontana
- Baccharis amambayensis
- Baccharis angusticeps
- Baccharis angustifolia
- Baccharis anomala
- Baccharis angustior
- Baccharis antioquensis
- Baccharis antucensis
- Baccharis aphylla
- Baccharis apicifoliosa
- Baccharis aracatubaensis
- Baccharis arbutifolia
- Baccharis arcuata
- Baccharis arenaria
- Baccharis aretioides
- Baccharis arguta
- Baccharis arizonica
- Baccharis artemisioides
- Baccharis articulata
- Baccharis asperula
- Baccharis auriculigera
- Baccharis australis
- Baccharis axillaris
- Baccharis ayacuchensis
- Baccharis barragensis
- Baccharis beckii
- Baccharis bicolor
- Baccharis bifrons
- Baccharis bigelovii
- Baccharis bogotensis
- Baccharis boliviensis
- Baccharis boyacensis
- Baccharis brachyphylla
- Baccharis brachystachys
- Baccharis bracteolata
- Baccharis brevifolia
- Baccharis breviseta
- Baccharis buchtienii
- Baccharis buddlejoides
- Baccharis burchellii
- Baccharis buxifolia
- Baccharis cabrerae
- Baccharis caespitosa
- Baccharis caldasiana
- Baccharis calvescens
- Baccharis campos-portoana
- Baccharis cana
- Baccharis canescens
- Baccharis capitalensis
- Baccharis caprariifolia
- Baccharis caramavidensis
- Baccharis cataphracta
- Baccharis chachapoyasensis
- Baccharis charucoensis
- Baccharis chilcaura
- Baccharis chilco
- Baccharis chillanensis
- Baccharis chionolaenoides
- Baccharis chiquitos
- Baccharis ciliata
- Baccharis cinerea
- Baccharis claussenii
- Baccharis clavata
- Baccharis cochensis
- Baccharis cognata
- Baccharis concava
- Baccharis concavoides
- Baccharis conferta
- Baccharis confertifolia
- Baccharis confertoides
- Baccharis conyzoides
- Baccharis cordata
- Baccharis coridifolia
- Baccharis coronata
- Baccharis corymbosa
- Baccharis cotinifolium
- Baccharis crassicuneata
- Baccharis crassipappa
- Baccharis crenatolycioides
- Baccharis cultrata
- Baccharis cundinamarcensis
- Baccharis curitybensis
- Baccharis cutervensis
- Baccharis cyanosa
- Baccharis cymosa
- Baccharis darwinii
- Baccharis davidsonii
- Baccharis deblei
- Baccharis decurrens
- Baccharis decussata
- Baccharis deltoidea
- Baccharis demissa
- Baccharis densa
- Baccharis densiflora
- Baccharis dentata
- Baccharis dependens
- Baccharis dichotoma
- Baccharis dioica
- Baccharis divaricata
- Baccharis dracunculifolia
- Baccharis dubia
- Baccharis dunensis
- Baccharis effusa
- Baccharis elaeoides
- Baccharis elliptica
- Baccharis emarginata
- Baccharis erectifolia
- Baccharis erigeroides
- Baccharis erioclada
- Baccharis erosoricola
- Baccharis espadae
- Baccharis exspectata
- Baccharis exyngioides
- Baccharis famatinensis
- Baccharis farallonensis
- Baccharis flabellata
- Baccharis flexuosiramosa
- Baccharis floccosa
- Baccharis floribundoides
- Baccharis fraterna
- Baccharis fraudulenta
- Baccharis frenguellii
- Baccharis friburgensis
- Baccharis fusca
- Baccharis gaudichaudiana
- Baccharis genistelloides
- Baccharis genistifolia
- Baccharis gibertii
- Baccharis gilliesii
- Baccharis glabra
- Baccharis glabrata
- Baccharis glauca
- Baccharis glaucescens
- Baccharis glaziovii
- Baccharis glomerata
- Baccharis glomeruliflora
- Baccharis glutinosa
- Baccharis gnaphalioides
- Baccharis gnidiifolia
- Baccharis gracilis
- Baccharis granadina
- Baccharis grandiflora
- Baccharis grandimucronata
- Baccharis grisebachii
- Baccharis haitiensis
- Baccharis halimifolia
- Baccharis hambatensis
- Baccharis havardii
- Baccharis helichrysoides
- Baccharis hemiptera
- Baccharis herbacea
- Baccharis heterophylla
- Baccharis hieronymi
- Baccharis hirta
- Baccharis horizontalis
- Baccharis huairacajensis
- Baccharis humifusa
- Baccharis humilis
- Baccharis hutchisonii
- Baccharis hyemalis
- Baccharis hypericifolia
- Baccharis illinita
- Baccharis illinitoides
- Baccharis inamoena
- Baccharis incisa
- Baccharis inexspectata
- Baccharis intermedia
- Baccharis intermixta
- Baccharis itapirocensis
- Baccharis itatiaiae
- Baccharis jocheniana
- Baccharis johnwurdackiana
- Baccharis juncea
- Baccharis junciformis
- Baccharis kingii
- Baccharis klattii
- Baccharis kurtziana
- Baccharis lancifolia
- Baccharis lateralis
- Baccharis latifolia
- Baccharis ledifolia
- Baccharis lehmannii
- Baccharis leptocephala
- Baccharis leptospermoides
- Baccharis leucocephala
- Baccharis leucopappa
- Baccharis lewisii
- Baccharis libertadensis
- Baccharis ligustrina
- Baccharis lilloi
- Baccharis linearifolia
- Baccharis linearis
- Baccharis longiattenuata
- Baccharis lundii
- Baccharis lychnophora
- Baccharis lycioides
- Baccharis lymanii
- Baccharis macraei
- Baccharis macrocephala
- Baccharis macrophylla
- Baccharis magellanica
- Baccharis magnifica
- Baccharis malibuensis
- Baccharis malmei
- Baccharis mandonii
- Baccharis marcetiifolia
- Baccharis maritima
- Baccharis martiana
- Baccharis maxima
- Baccharis megapotamica
- Baccharis melanopotamica
- Baccharis meridensi
- Baccharis mesoneura
- Baccharis mexicana
- Baccharis meyeniana
- Baccharis micrantha
- Baccharis microcephala
- Baccharis microdonta
- Baccharis milleflora
- Baccharis minutiflora
- Baccharis mocoafluminis
- Baccharis mollis
- Baccharis monoica
- Baccharis montana
- Baccharis moritziana
- Baccharis multibracteata
- Baccharis multiflora
- Baccharis multifolia
- Baccharis mutisiana
- Baccharis mylodontis
- Baccharis myricifolia
- Baccharis myrsinites
- Baccharis napaea
- Baccharis neaei
- Baccharis nebularis
- Baccharis neglecta
- Baccharis nervosa
- Baccharis niederleinii
- Baccharis nipensis
- Baccharis nitida
- Baccharis nivalis
- Baccharis notosergila
- Baccharis nummularia
- Baccharis oblongifolia
- Baccharis obovata
- Baccharis occidentalis
- Baccharis ochracea
- Baccharis oleifolia
- Baccharis opuntioides
- Baccharis orbiculata
- Baccharis orbignyana
- Baccharis oreophila
- Baccharis organensis
- Baccharis orientalis
- Baccharis oxyodonta
- Baccharis pachycephala
- Baccharis padifolia
- Baccharis palmeri
- Baccharis palustris
- Baccharis pampeana
- Baccharis paniculata
- Baccharis papillosa
- Baccharis paramicola
- Baccharis paranensis
- Baccharis parvidentata
- Baccharis parvifolia
- Baccharis pascensis
- Baccharis patagonica
- Baccharis patens
- Baccharis paucicostata
- Baccharis pauciflosculosa
- Baccharis pedersenii
- Baccharis pedunculata
- Baccharis pellucida
- Baccharis pendonta
- Baccharis penningtonii
- Baccharis pentaptera
- Baccharis pentlandii
- Baccharis pentodonta
- Baccharis perulata
- Baccharis petrophila
- Baccharis philipensis
- Baccharis phlogopappa
- Baccharis phylicifolia
- Baccharis phylicoides
- Baccharis phyteuma
- Baccharis phyteumoides
- Baccharis pilcensis
- Baccharis pilularis
- Baccharis pingrala
- Baccharis platypoda
- Baccharis plummerae
- Baccharis pluricapitulata
- Baccharis pohlii
- Baccharis polifolia
- Baccharis polygama
- Baccharis polyphylla
- Baccharis potosiensis
- Baccharis potrerillana
- Baccharis praetermissa
- Baccharis prunifolia
- Baccharis pseudoalpestris
- Baccharis pseudolycioides
- Baccharis pseudomyriocephala
- Baccharis pseudoneaei
- Baccharis pseudopalenae
- Baccharis pseudopilcensis
- Baccharis pseudotenuifolia
- Baccharis pseudovaccinioides
- Baccharis pseudovillosa
- Baccharis psiadioides
- Baccharis ptarmicifolia
- Baccharis pteronioides
- Baccharis pulchella
- Baccharis pululahuensis
- Baccharis pumila
- Baccharis punctulata
- Baccharis pycnantha
- Baccharis quitensis
- Baccharis racemosa
- Baccharis ramboi
- Baccharis ramiflora
- Baccharis raulii
- Baccharis regnellii
- Baccharis retamoides
- Baccharis reticularia
- Baccharis reticularioides
- Baccharis reticulata
- Baccharis retusa
- Baccharis revoluta
- Baccharis rhomboidalis
- Baccharis riograndensis
- Baccharis rivularis
- Baccharis rodriguezii
- Baccharis rosmarinus
- Baccharis rotundifolia
- Baccharis rufidula
- Baccharis rupestris
- Baccharis rupicola
- Baccharis sagittalis
- Baccharis salicifolia
- Baccharis salicina
- Baccharis saliens
- Baccharis samensis
- Baccharis santiagensis
- Baccharis sarothroides
- Baccharis saxatilis
- Baccharis scabra
- Baccharis scabridula
- Baccharis scabrifolia
- Baccharis scandens
- Baccharis schomburgkii
- Baccharis scoparia
- Baccharis scopulorum
- Baccharis sculpta
- Baccharis seemannii
- Baccharis selloi
- Baccharis semiserrata
- Baccharis septentrionalis
- Baccharis sergiloides
- Baccharis serranoi
- Baccharis serrifolia
- Baccharis serrula
- Baccharis serrulata
- Baccharis sessiliflora Vahl
- Baccharis sessilifolia (Less.) DC.
- Baccharis singularis
- Baccharis sinuata
- Baccharis sordescens
- Baccharis spartea
- Baccharis spartioides
- Baccharis spegazzinii
- Baccharis sphaerocephala
- Baccharis sphagnophila
- Baccharis sphenophylla
- Baccharis spicata
- Baccharis steetzii
- Baccharis stenophylla
- Baccharis stuebelii
- Baccharis stylosa
- Baccharis subaequalis
- Baccharis subalata
- Baccharis subbimera
- Baccharis subdentata
- Baccharis suberectifolia
- Baccharis subopposita
- Baccharis subtropicalis
- Baccharis sulcata
- Baccharis supplex
- Baccharis taltalensis
- Baccharis tarapacana
- Baccharis tarchonanthoides
- Baccharis tarmensis
- Baccharis teindalensis
- Baccharis tenella
- Baccharis tenuicapitulata
- Baccharis tenuifolia
- Baccharis texana
- Baccharis thesioides
- Baccharis thymifolia
- Baccharis tomentosa
- Baccharis torricoi
- Baccharis toxicaria
- Baccharis triangularis
- Baccharis tricuneata
- Baccharis tridentata
- Baccharis trilobata
- Baccharis trimeroides
- Baccharis trineura
- Baccharis truncata
- Baccharis tucumanensis
- Baccharis uleana
- Baccharis ulicina
- Baccharis umbellata
- Baccharis uncinella
- Baccharis uniflora
- Baccharis urvilleana
- Baccharis vacciniifolia
- Baccharis vaccinioides
- Baccharis vanessae
- Baccharis venosa
- Baccharis venulosoides
- Baccharis vernalis
- Baccharis vernicosa
- Baccharis vincifolia
- Baccharis vismioides
- Baccharis vitis-idaea
- Baccharis volubilis
- Baccharis vulneraria
- Baccharis wagenitzii
- Baccharis weirii
- Baccharis wendlandii
- Baccharis woodii
- Baccharis wrightii
- Baccharis xiphophylla
- Baccharis zamoranensis
- Baccharis zamudiorum
- Baccharis zoellneri
- Baccharis zongoensis
- Baccharis zumbadorensis
