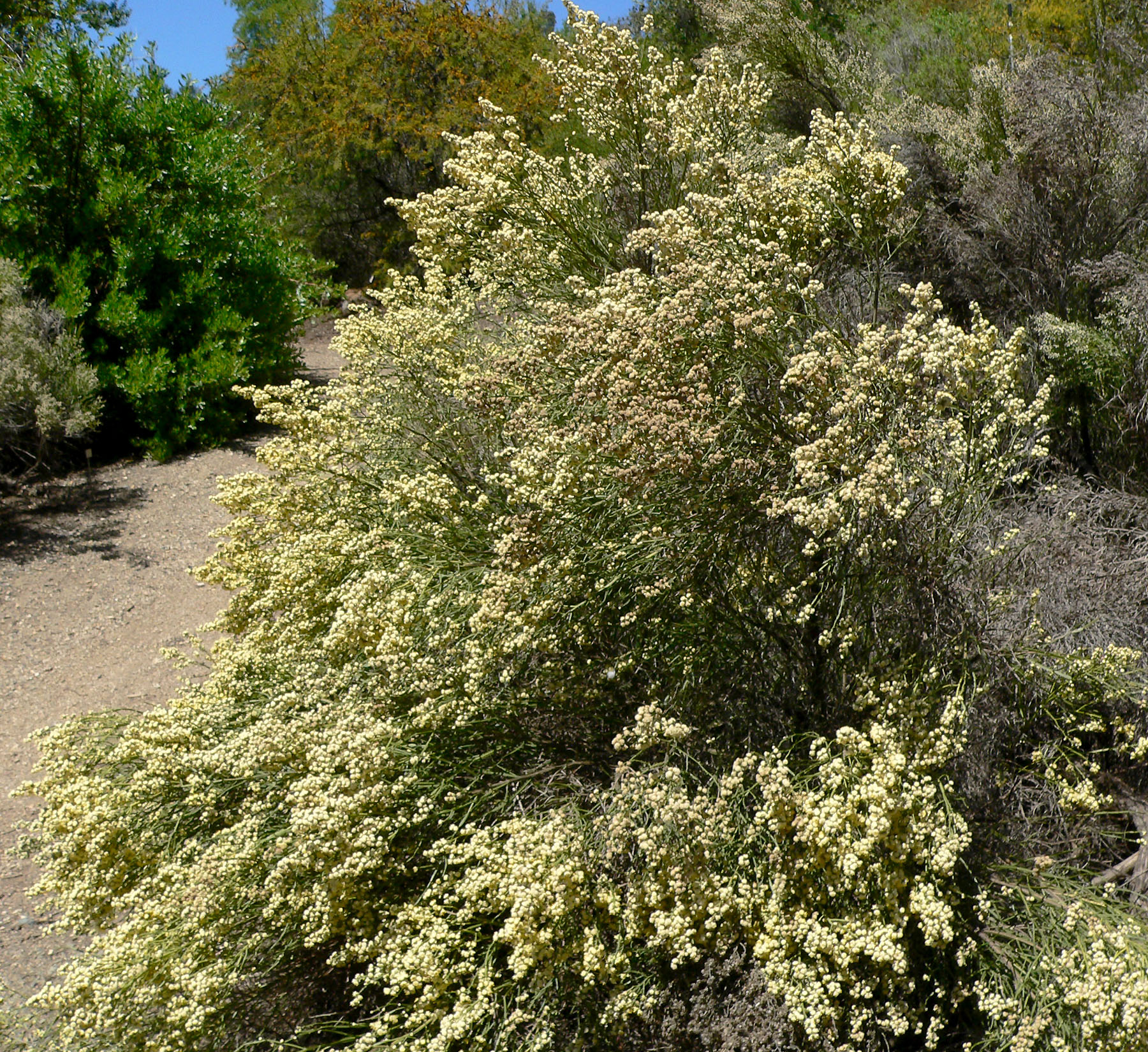
- Flowering Baccharis articulata

Scientific classification
- Kingdom: Plantae
- Clade: Tracheophytes
- Clade: Angiosperms
- Clade: Eudicots
- Clade: Asterids
- Order: Asterales
- Family: Asteraceae
- Subfamily: Asteroideae
- Tribe: Astereae
- Subtribe: Baccharidinae
- Genus: Baccharis; L.

Species
- Some 250-400, see text

Synonyms
- Achyrobaccharis Sch.Bip.; Arrhenachne Cass.; Baccharidastrum Cabrera; Baccharidiopsis G.M.Barroso; Heterothalamulopsis Deble, A.S.Oliveira & Marchiori; Heterothalamus Less.; Icma Phil.; Lanugothamnus Deble; Molina Ruiz & Pav.; Neomolina F.H.Hellw.; Palenia Phil.; Pingraea Cass.; Polypappus Less.; Pterocladis Lamb.; Sergilus Gaertn.; Stephananthus Lehm.; Tursenia Cass.

= Baccharis =

Genus of flowering plants

Baccharis /ˈbækərɪs/ is a genus of perennials and shrubs in the aster family (Asteraceae). They are commonly known as baccharises but sometimes referred to as "brooms", because many members have small thin leaves resembling the true brooms. They are not at all related to these however, but belong to an entirely different lineage of eudicots. B. halimifolia is commonly known as "groundsel bush", however true groundsels are found in the genus Senecio.

Baccharis, with over 500 species, is one of the largest genera in the Asteraceae. It is found throughout the Americas, distributed mainly in the warmer regions of Brazil, Argentina, Colombia, Chile and Mexico, with B. halimifolia ranging northward along the Atlantic Coast to the southern tip of Nova Scotia in Canada.

If present, the leaves of Baccharis are borne along the stems in alternate fashion. Flowers are usually white or pinkish. There are no ray flowers, but many disk flowers which are either staminate or pistillate.

Some species of Baccharis are toxic to animals; in particular, consumption of B. coridifolia may lead to necrosis in the gastrointestinal tract of cattle, horses, sheep, and rabbits.

The genus Baccharis is named after Bacchus (Dionysus), the Roman god of wine.

== Classification ==
Baccharis is related to the genera Archibaccharis and Heterothalamus. All Baccharis are dioecious except Baccharis monoica.

== Ecology ==
Baccharis are used as food plants by the larvae of some Lepidoptera species, such as the swift moths Phymatopus californicus and P. hectoides. Those of the leaf-miner moths Bucculatrix dominatrix and B. seperabilis feed exclusively on bush baccharis (B. pilularis), B. ivella has been found on eastern baccharis, and B. variabilis is a polyphagous species which has been recorded on various Baccharis. The Coleophora case-bearers C. linosyridella and C. viscidiflorella are polyphagous species whose larvae have been recorded on the Bush Baccharis as well as other plants. Caterpillars of the owlet moth Schinia ocularis feed exclusively on broom baccharis (B. sarothroides).

Baccharis conferta, native to Mexico, was chosen to serve as nurse plants to protect from frost and drought newly planted tree seedlings of Abies religiosa in the world's first assisted migration experiment that coupled upslope planting of the fir tree in anticipation of climate change forcing overwintering Monarch butterflies to seek higher elevations in central Mexico.

== Uses ==
Several species of Baccharis are of interest for cultivation, as the dense but flexible stem structure makes for a good windbreak.

Plants of this genus are rich in terpenes, and some are used in native or folk medicine. One that has been specifically described from Chilean and Argentinean Baccharis is viscidone.

Baccharis flowers are rich in nectar, and several species are good honey plants. Particularly B. dracunculifolia is highly esteemed by beekeepers.

== Conservation ==
A few Baccharis species (especially from the northern Andes) are almost extinct due to habitat destruction. The northernmost occurrence of B. halimifolia, in Nova Scotia, Canada, is also receiving conservation attention.

== Invasiveness ==
Some Baccharis species, particularly Eastern baccharis (B. halimifolia), have become invasive weeds in places such as Australia and Spain, where they are not native.

== Selected species ==
For the complete list of species see List of Baccharis species.

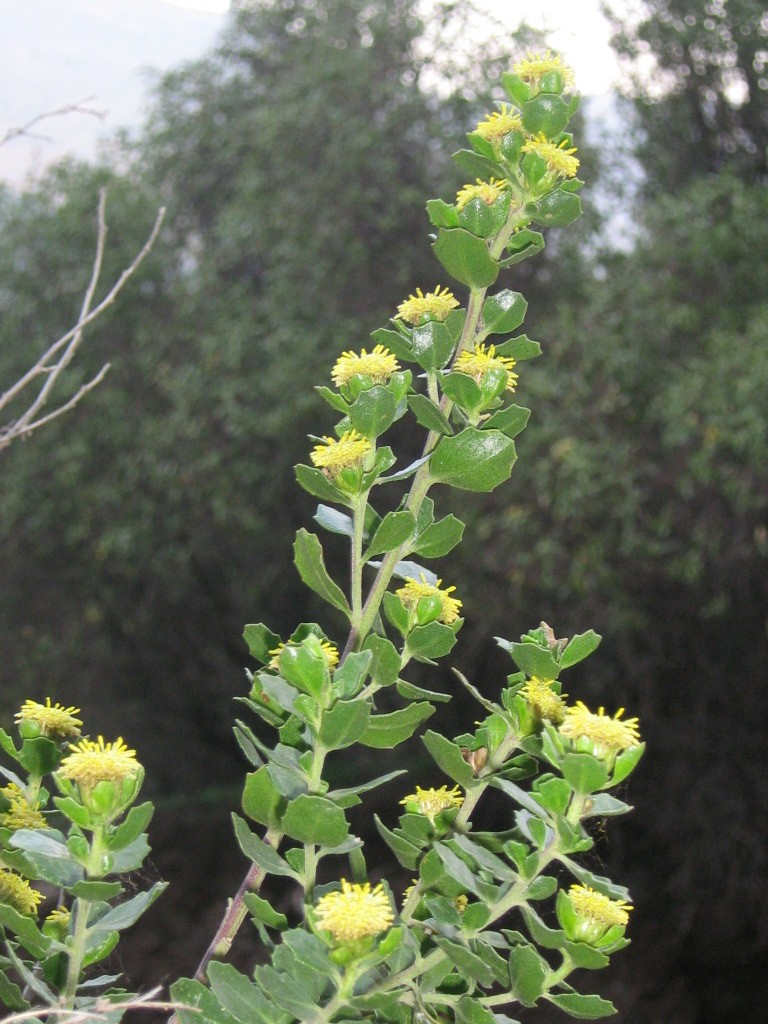
Baccharis rhomboidalis inflorescences

- Baccharis acutata (Alain) Borhidi
- Baccharis alaternoides Kunth
- Baccharis albida Hook. & Arn.
- Baccharis × alboffii F.H.Hellw.
- Baccharis albolanosa A.S.Oliveira & Deble
- Baccharis aliena (Spreng.) Joch.Müll.
- Baccharis alleluia A.S.Oliveira & Deble
- Baccharis alnifolia Meyen & Walp.
- Baccharis alpestris Gardner
- Baccharis alpina Kunth
- Baccharis altimontana G.Heiden, Baumgratz & R.Esteves
- Baccharis amambayensis Zardini & Soria
- Baccharis anabelae (Deble) G.Heiden
- Baccharis angusticeps Dusén ex Malme
- Baccharis angustifolia Michaux
- Baccharis anomala DC.
- Baccharis antioquensis Killip & Cuatrec.
- Baccharis × antucensis F.H.Hellw.
- Baccharis aphylla DC.
- Baccharis apicifoliosa A.A.Schneid. & Boldrini
- Baccharis aracatubensis Malag. & Hatschb. ex G.M.Barroso
- Baccharis arbutifolia(Lam.) Vahl
- Baccharis × arcuata F.H.Hellw.
- Baccharis arenaria Baker
- Baccharis aretioides Turcz.
- Baccharis artemisioides Hook. & Arn.
- Baccharis articulata (Lam.) Pers.
- Baccharis auriculigera Hieron.
- Baccharis × australis F.H.Hellw.
- Baccharis axillaris DC.
- Baccharis ayacuchensis Cuatrec.
- Baccharis barragensis Cuatrec.
- Baccharis beckii Joch.Müll.
- Baccharis bicolor (Joch.Müll.) G.Heiden
- Baccharis bifrons Baker
- Baccharis bigelovii A.Gray
- Baccharis bogotensis Kunth
- Baccharis boliviensis (Wedd.) Cabrera
- Baccharis boyacensis Cuatrec.
- Baccharis brachylaenoides DC.
- Baccharis brachyphylla A.Gray
- Baccharis brachystachys (Baker) Malag. & J.Vidal
- Baccharis brevifolia DC.
- Baccharis brevipappa (McVaugh) G.L.Nesom
- Baccharis breviseta DC.
- Baccharis buchtienii H.Rob.
- Baccharis burchellii Baker
- Baccharis buxifolia Pers.
- Baccharis cabrerae Ariza
- Baccharis caespitosa (Ruiz & Pav.) Pers.
- Baccharis concava (Ruiz & Pav.) Pers.
- Baccharis dioica
- Baccharis douglasii DC. – Saltmarsh baccharis, Douglas' baccharis
- Baccharis dracunculifolia DC.
- Baccharis eggersii Hieron.
- Baccharis emoryi A.Gray
- Baccharis fusca Turcz.
- Baccharis genistelloides Pers.
- Baccharis glomeruliflora
- Baccharis glutinosa
- Baccharis gracilis DC.
- Baccharis halimifolia L. – Eastern baccharis, groundsel bush, groundsel tree, consumption weed, cotton-seed tree, silverling
- Baccharis hambatensis Kunth
- Baccharis havardii
- Baccharis hieronymi Heering
- Baccharis huairacajensis Hieron.
- Baccharis humilis Sch.Bip. ex Baker
- Baccharis intermedia DC.
- Baccharis intermixta Gardner
- Baccharis juncea (Lehm.) Desf.
- Baccharis klattii Benoist
- Baccharis ligustrina DC.
- Baccharis linearis (Ruiz & Pav.) Pers. – Chilean romerillo
- Baccharis macraei Hook. & Arn.
- Baccharis malibuensis R.M.Beauch. & J.Henrickson
- Baccharis microdonta DC.
- Baccharis myrsinites
- Baccharis neglecta
- Baccharis odorata – Tayanka bush
- Baccharis patagonica
- Baccharis pilularis DC. – Bush baccharis, coyote brush, coyote bush, chaparral broom
- Baccharis platypoda DC.
- Baccharis plummerae A.Gray
- Baccharis pteronioides
- Baccharis punctulata DC.
- Baccharis racemosa (Ruiz & Pav.) DC.
- Baccharis rhomboidalis Remy
- Baccharis sagittalis
- Baccharis salicifolia (Ruiz & Pav.) Pers. – Mulefat, seep-willow, water-wally
- Baccharis salicina
- Baccharis sarothroides A.Gray – Broom baccharis, Desert broom
- Baccharis semiserrata DC.
- Baccharis sergiloides A.Gray – Desert baccharis
- Baccharis serrula Sch.Bip.
- Baccharis sessifolia L.
- Baccharis sphaerocephala
- Baccharis spicata (Lam.) Baill.
- Baccharis texana
- Baccharis thesioides
- Baccharis tricuneata (L.f.) Pers.
- Baccharis tridentata Vahl
- Baccharis trimera (Less.) DC.
- Baccharis uncinella DC.
- Baccharis vanessae R.M.Beauch.
- Baccharis wrightii – Wright's false willow
- Baccharis wurdackeana Malag.
- Baccharis xiphophylla Baker
- Baccharis zamoranensis Rzed.
- Baccharis zamudiorum Rzed.
- Baccharis zoellneri F.H.Hellw.
- Baccharis zongoensis Joch.Müll.
- Baccharis zumbadorensis V.M.Badillo

=== Formerly placed in Baccharis ===
The following species are among the many that were considered to belong within Baccharis but are now classified in other genera:

- Isocoma veneta (Kunth) Greene (as B. veneta Kunth)
- Pluchea foetida (L.) DC. (as B. foetida L.)
- Pluchea indica (L.) Less. (as B. indica L.)
- Ozothamnus hookeri Sond. (as B. lepidophylla DC.)
- Vernonanthura brasiliana (L.) H.Rob. (as B. brasiliana L.)
- Vernonanthura montevidensis (Spreng.) H.Rob. (as B. montevidensis Spreng.)

== Bibliography ==
- Linnaeus, Carl (1753). Species plantarum : exhibentes plantas rite cognitas ad genera relatas, cum differentiis specificis, nominibus trivialibus, synonymis selectis, locis natalibus, secundum systema sexuale digestas (in Latin). Vol. 2. Berlin: Junk.
