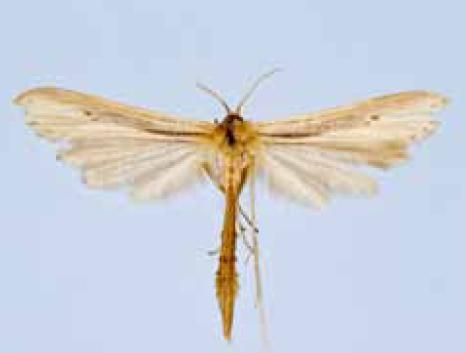

Scientific classification
- Kingdom: Animalia
- Phylum: Arthropoda
- Class: Insecta
- Order: Lepidoptera
- Family: Pterophoridae
- Genus: Hellinsia
- Species: H. balanotes

Binomial name
- Hellinsia balanotes (Meyrick, 1908)

Synonyms
- Pterophora balanotes Meyrick, 1908; Pterophora aquila Meyrick, 1908; Oidaematophorus balanotes

= Hellinsia balanotes =

Species of plume moth

Hellinsia balanotes, the baccharis borer, is a moth of the family Pterophoridae which is native to Guatemala, northern Mexico, and the United States including Arizona, Texas, Florida, Mississippi, South Carolina and Maryland, but has been introduced to Australia for the control of Baccharis halimifolia. The species was first described by Edward Meyrick in 1908.

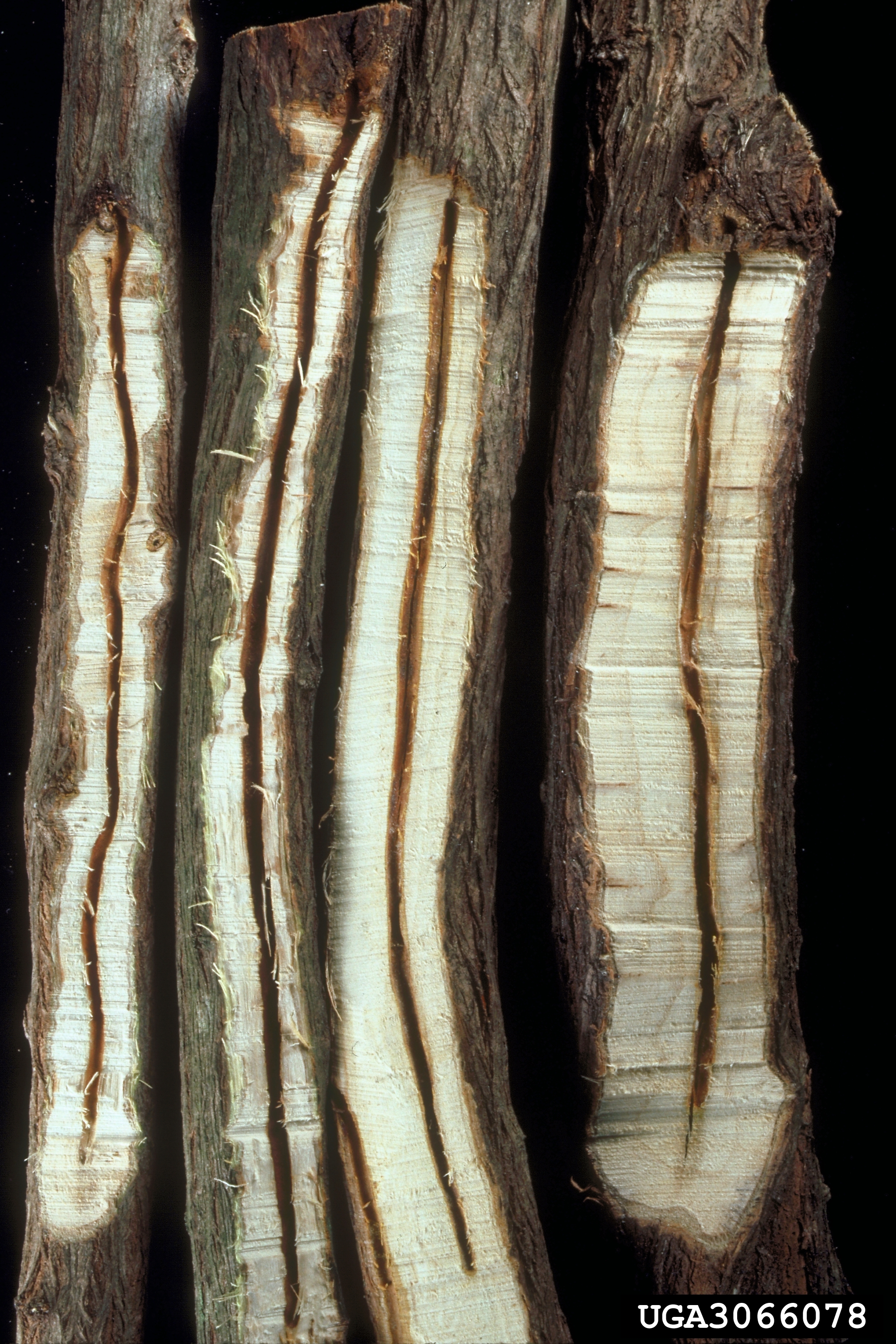
Damage

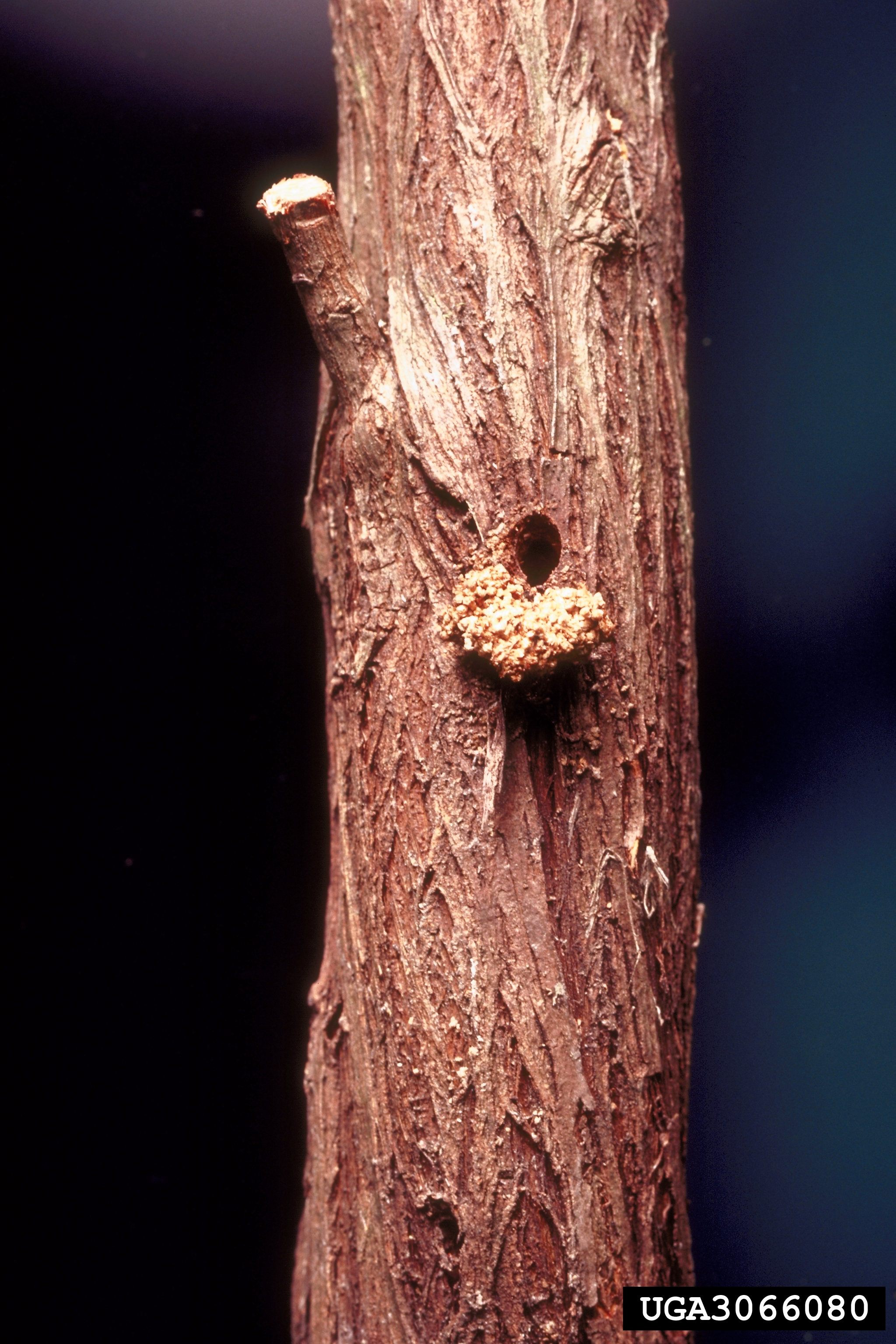
Damage

The wingspan is 31–42 millimetres (1.2–1.7 in). Adults are on wing year round.

The larvae feed on Baccharis (including Baccharis halimifolia, Baccharis salicina, Baccharis neglecta and Baccharis angustifolia) and Pluchea sericea. The feeding results in long narrow galleries in the stem of the host plant.
