= Povertyweed =

Povertyweed is a common name for several plants and may refer to:

- Baccharis neglecta
- Iva axillaris
- Monolepis nuttalliana
