= Bucculatrix ivella =

Scientific classification
- Kingdom: Animalia
- Phylum: Arthropoda
- Clade: Pancrustacea
- Class: Insecta
- Order: Lepidoptera
- Family: Bucculatricidae
- Genus: Bucculatrix
- Species: B. ivella

Binomial name
- Bucculatrix ivella Busck, 1900

Synonyms
- Ogmograptis ivella

Species of moth

Bucculatrix ivella (the groundsel leaf-perforator moth or groundsel leaf-mining moth) is a moth of the family Bucculatricidae. It was described in 1900 by August Busck. It is native to North America, but has been introduced to Queensland, Australia.

The larvae feed on Baccharis halimifolia and Baccharis neglecta.
