= Baccharis acutata =

Scientific classification
- Kingdom: Plantae
- Clade: Tracheophytes
- Clade: Angiosperms
- Clade: Eudicots
- Clade: Asterids
- Order: Asterales
- Family: Asteraceae
- Genus: Baccharis
- Species: B. acutata

Binomial name
- Baccharis acutata (Alain) Borhidi.

Synonyms
- Baccharis orientalis var. acutata Alain

Species of plant

Baccharis acutata is a species of flowering plant in the family Asteraceae. It is endemic to Cuba. It was first described in 1975.
