= Baccharis alaternoides =

Scientific classification
- Kingdom: Plantae
- Clade: Tracheophytes
- Clade: Angiosperms
- Clade: Eudicots
- Clade: Asterids
- Order: Asterales
- Family: Asteraceae
- Genus: Baccharis
- Species: B. alaternoides

Binomial name
- Baccharis alaternoides Kunth

Synonyms
- Baccharis resinosa Hook. & Arn.; Baccharis tridentata Poepp. ex DC.

Species of plant

Baccharis alaternoides is a shrub of the family Asteraceae found in the Andes with a distribution from Ecuador to Peru.
