= Baccharis eggersii =

Conservation status
- Data Deficient (IUCN 3.1)

Scientific classification
- Kingdom: Plantae
- Clade: Tracheophytes
- Clade: Angiosperms
- Clade: Eudicots
- Clade: Asterids
- Order: Asterales
- Family: Asteraceae
- Genus: Baccharis
- Species: B. eggersii

Binomial name
- Baccharis eggersii Hieron.

Species of flowering plant

Baccharis eggersii is a species of flowering plant in the family Asteraceae that is endemic to Ecuador. Its natural habitat is subtropical or tropical dry forests. It is threatened by habitat loss. It may occur in Churute Mangroves Ecological Reserve and Machalilla National Park.
