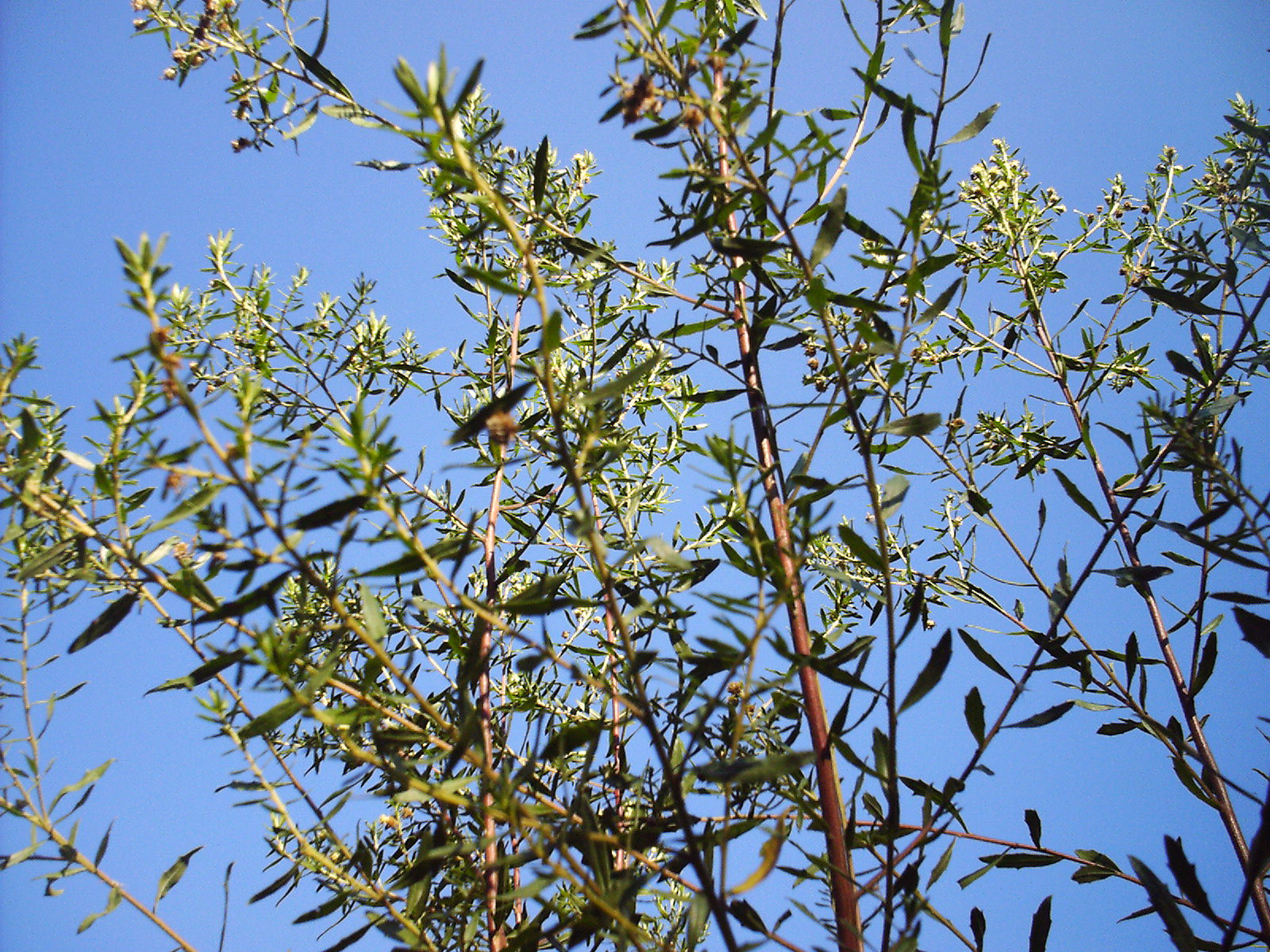

Scientific classification
- Kingdom: Plantae
- Clade: Tracheophytes
- Clade: Angiosperms
- Clade: Eudicots
- Clade: Asterids
- Order: Asterales
- Family: Asteraceae
- Genus: Baccharis
- Species: B. dracunculifolia

Binomial name
- Baccharis dracunculifolia DC.

Synonyms
- Baccharis bracteata Hook. & Arn.; Baccharis leptospermoides DC.; Baccharis paucidentata Sch.Bip. ex Baker; Baccharis pulverulenta Klatt; Conyza linearifolia Spreng.

= Baccharis dracunculifolia =

Species of flowering plant in the daisy family

Baccharis dracunculifolia is a medical plant found in Brazil, Bolivia, Argentina, and Uruguay.

Baccharis dracunculifolia is used for green propolis production.
