= Bucculatrix separabilis =

Scientific classification
- Kingdom: Animalia
- Phylum: Arthropoda
- Clade: Pancrustacea
- Class: Insecta
- Order: Lepidoptera
- Family: Bucculatricidae
- Genus: Bucculatrix
- Species: B. separabilis

Binomial name
- Bucculatrix separabilis Braun, 1963

Species of moth

Bucculatrix separabilis is a species of moth in the family Bucculatricidae. It is found in North America, where it has been recorded from California. It was described by Annette Frances Braun in 1963.

The larvae feed on Baccharis pilularis.
