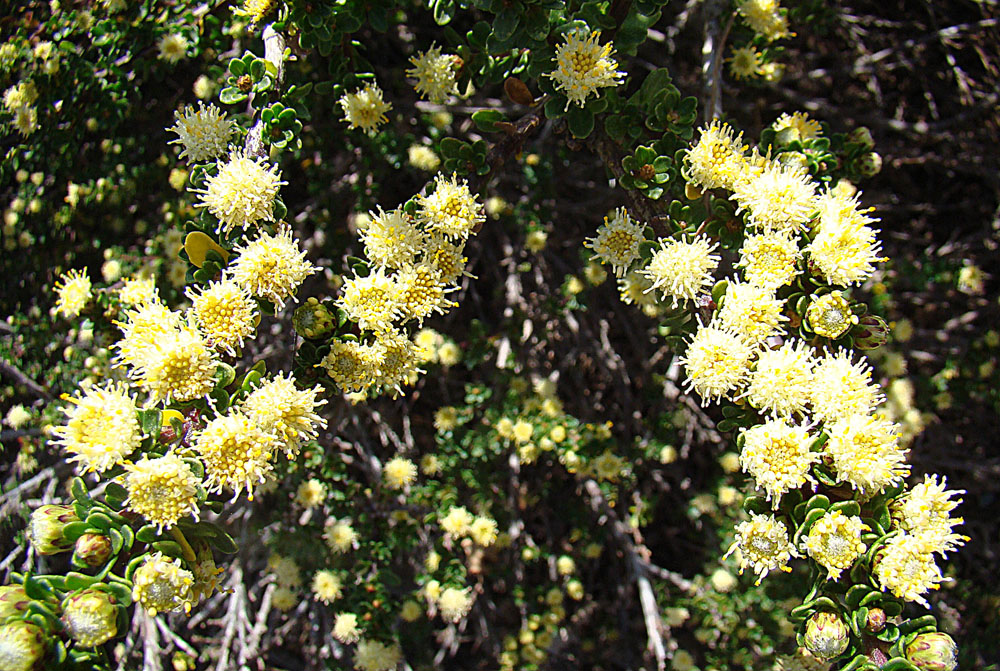
- Baccharis patagonica flowers

Scientific classification
- Kingdom: Plantae
- Clade: Tracheophytes
- Clade: Angiosperms
- Clade: Eudicots
- Clade: Asterids
- Order: Asterales
- Family: Asteraceae
- Genus: Baccharis
- Species: B. patagonica

Binomial name
- Baccharis patagonica Hook. & Arn.

= Baccharis patagonica =

Species of flowering plant

Baccharis patagonica is a species in the genus Baccharis in the family Asteraceae. It is native to southern Argentina and central and southern Chile, including the Juan Fernández Islands.

== Description ==
Evergreen, small-leaved shrub with an open habit, reaching 8-10 feet high or more at maturity. The leaves, which are obovate in shape, are a dark glossy green. Their margins are usually toothed toward the tips. Flowers in May. Can be propagated via cuttings at almost any time of year.

== Etymology ==
Baccharis is an ancient Greek name of dubious etymological origins. It is a cognate of βακχος (Bacchus), and may be in reference to the ritualistic frenzies, called bakkheia, which are inspired by that god. The name is ostensibly in reference to the spicy smell of the roots of plants in this genus.

Patagonica means 'from Patagonia'.
