= Bucculatrix variabilis =

Scientific classification
- Kingdom: Animalia
- Phylum: Arthropoda
- Clade: Pancrustacea
- Class: Insecta
- Order: Lepidoptera
- Family: Bucculatricidae
- Genus: Bucculatrix
- Species: B. variabilis

Binomial name
- Bucculatrix variabilis Braun, 1910

Species of moth

Bucculatrix variabilis is a moth in the family Bucculatricidae. It is found in North America, where it has been recorded from California. It was first described in 1910 by Annette Frances Braun.

The larvae feed on Baccharis pilularis.
