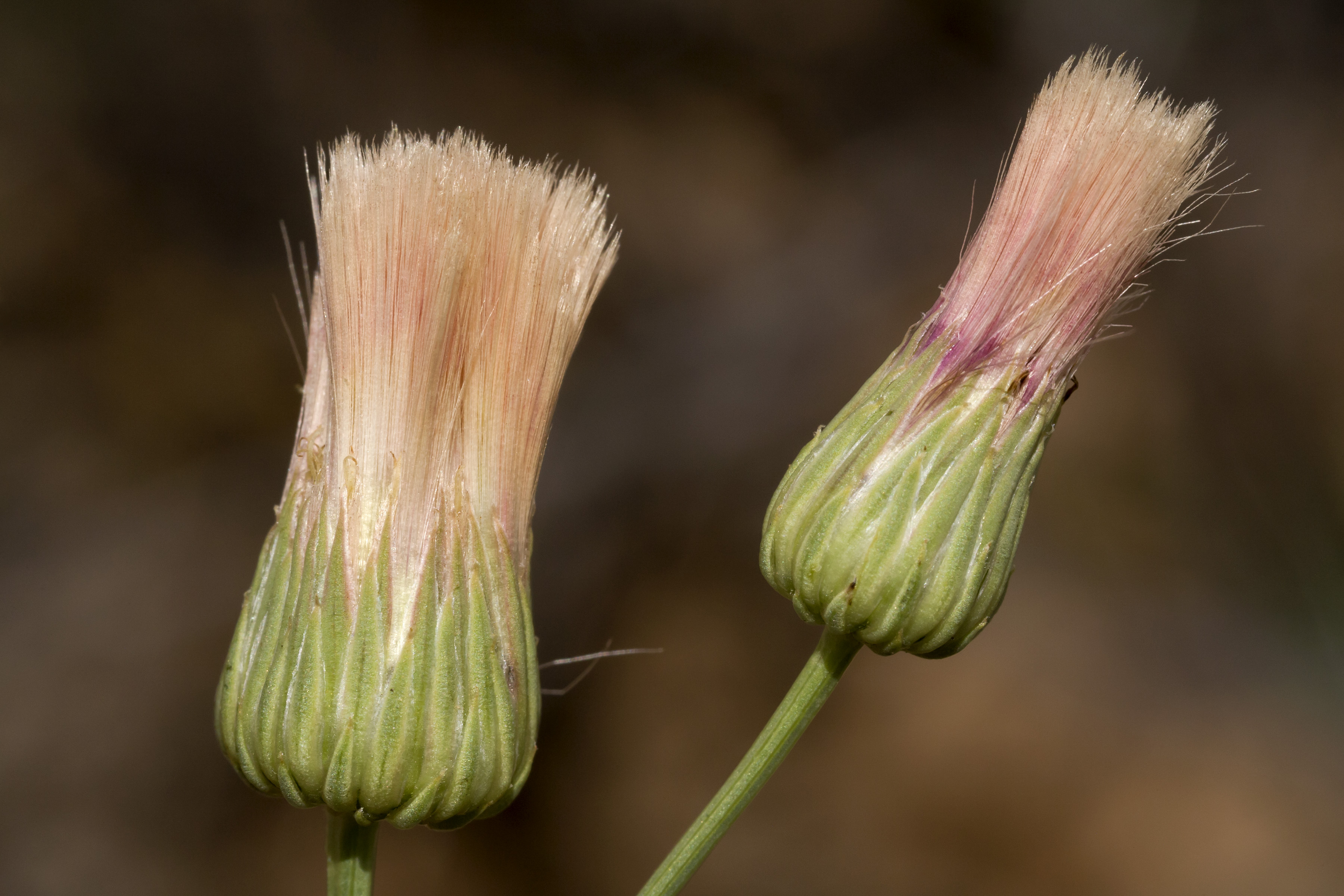

Conservation status
- Apparently Secure (NatureServe)

Scientific classification
- Kingdom: Plantae
- Clade: Tracheophytes
- Clade: Angiosperms
- Clade: Eudicots
- Clade: Asterids
- Order: Asterales
- Family: Asteraceae
- Genus: Baccharis
- Species: B. wrightii

Binomial name
- Baccharis wrightii A.Gray 1852 not Sch. Bip. 1856

Synonyms
- Baccharis squarrosa Kunth; Neomolina wrightii (A.Gray) F.H.Hellw.

= Baccharis wrightii =

Species of flowering plant

Baccharis wrightii is a North American species of shrubs in the family Asteraceae known by the common name Wright's baccharis or false willow. It is native to northern Mexico (Chihuahua, Coahuila, Durango, Sonora) and the southwestern and south-central United States (Arizona, New Mexico, Texas, Oklahoma, Kansas, Colorado, Utah).

== Description ==
Baccharis wrightii is a shrub up to 80 cm (32 inches) tall, the branches woody only at the bases. Flowering heads are usually borne one at a time on the ends of branches. The species grows on dry, sandy plains.
