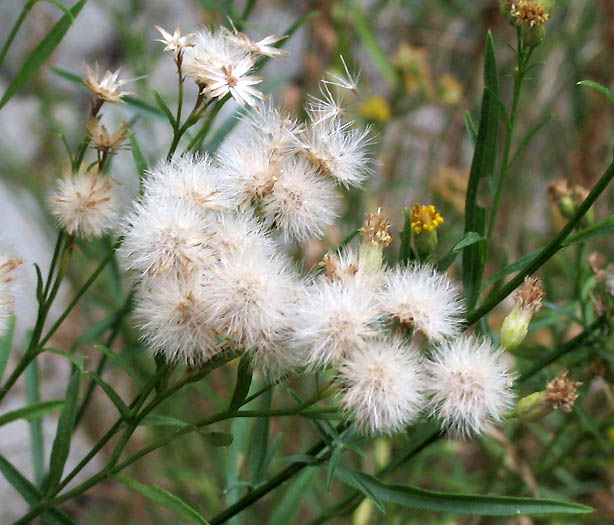

Scientific classification
- Kingdom: Plantae
- Clade: Tracheophytes
- Clade: Angiosperms
- Clade: Eudicots
- Clade: Asterids
- Order: Asterales
- Family: Asteraceae
- Genus: Baccharis
- Species: B. plummerae

Binomial name
- Baccharis plummerae A.Gray

Synonyms
- Neomolina plummerae (A.Gray) F.H.Hellw.

= Baccharis plummerae =

Species of flowering plant

Baccharis plummerae is a California species of Baccharis known by the common name Plummer's baccharis. It is named in honor of American botanist Sara Plummer Lemmon, 1836 – 1923.

== Distribution ==
The plant is endemic to chaparral habitats in Southern California. It can be found on the coastline, and in the Western Transverse Ranges, Outer South California Coast Ranges, and on the northern Channel Islands of California. Most of the populations are in a region from southern Monterey County to Los Angeles County, but there are a few isolated populations reported from Riverside County.

== Description ==
Baccharis plummerae is a bushy shrub producing many erect, slender stems approaching 2 metres (6.6 ft) in maximum height.

The leaves are linear to oblong in shape and sometimes have fine teeth along the edges. They may be up to 4.5 centimetres (1.8 in) long.

The shrub is dioecious, with male and female plants producing flower heads of different types. The head is enclosed in a layer of phyllaries which are glandular and sticky. The fruit is a ribbed achene with a pappus 7 millimetres (0.28 in) or 8 millimetres (0.31 in) long.

== See also ==
- Coastal sage scrub
- California coastal sage and chaparral ecoregion
- Natural history of the California chaparral and woodlands
