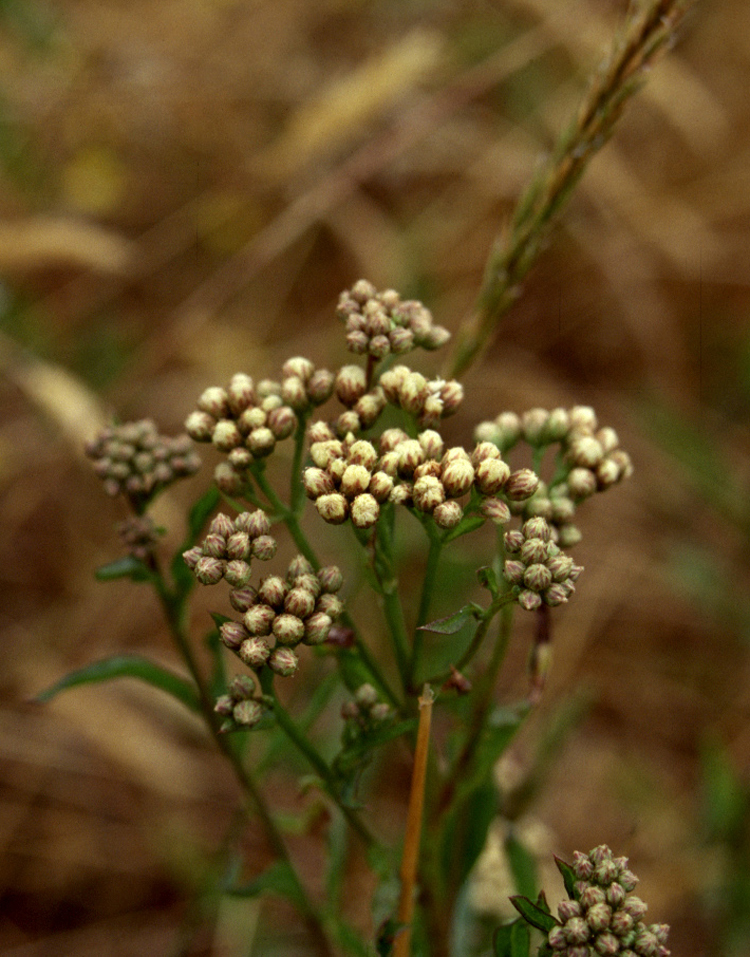
- Humboldt Bay National Wildlife Refuge, California

Scientific classification
- Kingdom: Plantae
- Clade: Embryophytes
- Clade: Tracheophytes
- Clade: Angiosperms
- Clade: Eudicots
- Clade: Asterids
- Order: Asterales
- Family: Asteraceae
- Genus: Baccharis
- Species: B. glutinosa

Binomial name
- Baccharis glutinosa Pers.

Synonyms
- Baccharis douglasii DC.; Molina viscosa Ruiz & Pav.; Baccharis haenkei DC.; Baccharis viscosa Hook. & Arn.; Pingraea viscosa (Ruiz & Pav.) F.H. Hellw.; Baccharis viscosa (Ruiz & Pav.) Kuntze; Baccharis pingraea DC.

= Baccharis glutinosa =

Species of flowering plant

Baccharis glutinosa is a species of flowering plant in the family Asteraceae known by the common names saltmarsh baccharis, marsh baccharis and Douglas' falsewillow.

The species has a discontinuous distribution, found in western North America (California, southern Oregon, northern Baja California) and in South America (Brazil, Bolivia, etc.). The North American populations were for many years listed as a separate species, B. douglasii, but more recent studies suggest that the plants from the two continents are better regarded as one species.

== Description ==
Baccharis glutinosa is a rhizomatous perennial herb growing to heights between one and two meters. The lance-shaped leaves are up to about 12 centimeters long and have short winged petioles. The foliage and inflorescences are resinous and sticky.

The plants are dioecious, with male plants producing clusters of up to 40 whitish staminate flowers and female plants bearing bunches of up to 150 fluffy whitish pistillate flowers with a hairlike pappus attached to each developing fruit.

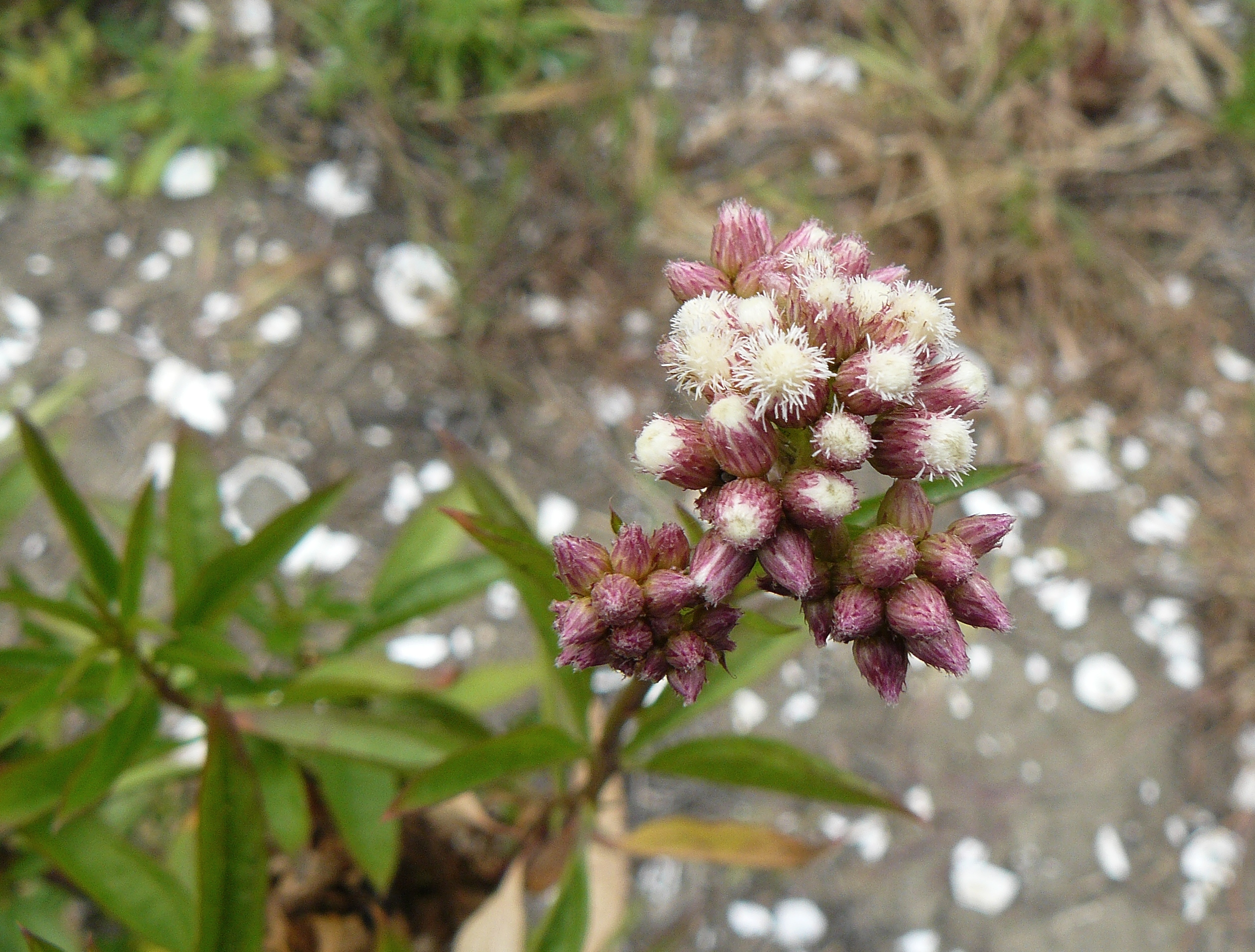
Salt marsh, Morro Bay State Park, California
