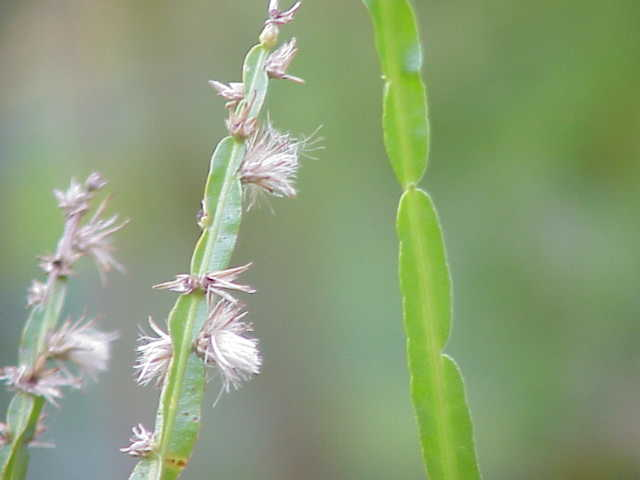

Scientific classification
- Kingdom: Plantae
- Clade: Tracheophytes
- Clade: Angiosperms
- Clade: Eudicots
- Clade: Asterids
- Order: Asterales
- Family: Asteraceae
- Genus: Baccharis
- Species: B. genistelloides

Binomial name
- Baccharis genistelloides (Lam.) Pers.

= Baccharis genistelloides =

Species of plant

Baccharis genistelloides is a species of flowering plant from the family Asteraceae. It is one of the most studied species in its genus Baccharis regarding its phytochemistry and pharmacological effects. The plant species is widely used in folk medicine.

The plant has been used as a folk treatment of high blood pressure, diabetes, stomachaches, and kidney infections. B. genistelloides contains flavonoids that may have anti-inflammatory effects.

Baccharis genistelloides is perennial.

The species along with almost all Baccharis species is dioecious, with the flowers on this plant being unisexual.

It is found in much of South America (Peru, Bolivia, Chile, Brazil, Colombia, Ecuador, Paraguay, and Uruguay).
