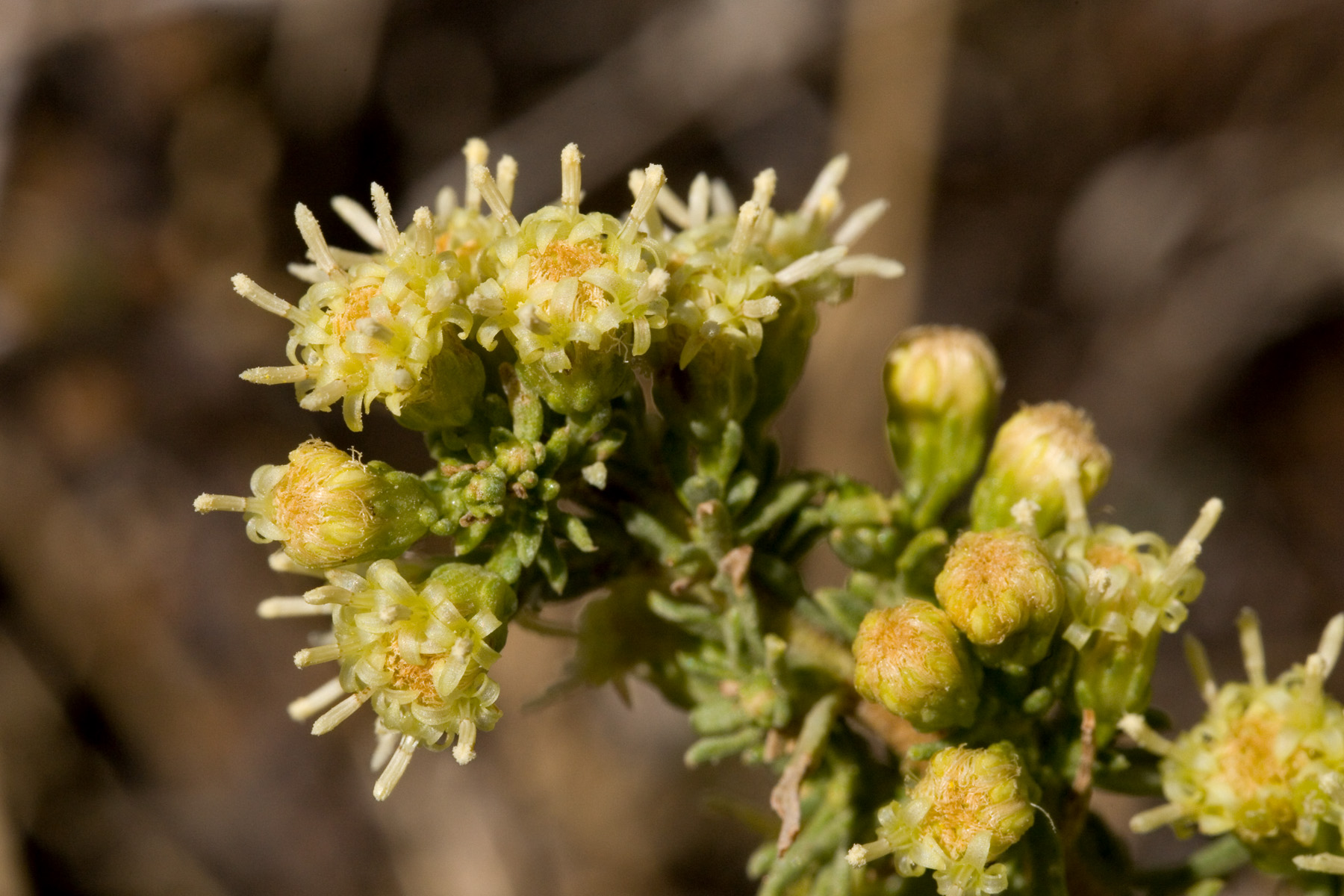

Scientific classification
- Kingdom: Plantae
- Clade: Tracheophytes
- Clade: Angiosperms
- Clade: Eudicots
- Clade: Asterids
- Order: Asterales
- Family: Asteraceae
- Genus: Baccharis
- Species: B. pteronioides

Binomial name
- Baccharis pteronioides A.Gray

Synonyms
- Baccharis ramulosa (DC.) A.Gray; Haplopappus ramulosus DC.; Linosyris ramulosa (DC.) A.Gray; Neomolina pteronioides (DC.) F.H.Hellw.

= Baccharis pteronioides =

Species of flowering plant

Baccharis pteronioides is a North American shrub in the family Asteraceae known by the common name yerba de pasmo. It is widespread in Mexico (from Chihuahua to Oaxaca) and also found in the southwestern United States (Arizona, New Mexico, western Texas).

Baccharis pteronioides is a shrub up to 100 cm (40 inches) tall, with thick, leathery leaves and many small flower heads. It grows in dry woodlands, grasslands, and canyons.
