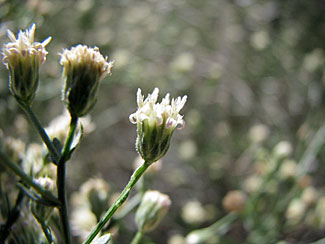

Scientific classification
- Kingdom: Plantae
- Clade: Tracheophytes
- Clade: Angiosperms
- Clade: Eudicots
- Clade: Asterids
- Order: Asterales
- Family: Asteraceae
- Genus: Baccharis
- Species: B. brachyphylla

Binomial name
- Baccharis brachyphylla A.Gray

Synonyms
- Neomolina brachyphylla (A.Gray) F.H.Hellw.

= Baccharis brachyphylla =

Species of flowering plant

Baccharis brachyphylla is a North American species of shrub in the family Asteraceae, known by the common name shortleaf baccharis or false willow. It is native to the southwestern United States (southern California, southern Nevada, Arizona, southern New Mexico, and western Texas) and northern Mexico (Baja California, Chihuahua, Sonora). It grows in desert habitats such as arroyos and canyons.

This is a shrub producing erect, branching green stems up to a meter tall. The leaves are linear or thinly lance-shaped and less than 2 centimetres (0.79 in) long. The inflorescence is a wide array of flower heads. A dioecious species, the male and female plants produce different flower types which are similar in appearance. The flowers and foliage are glandular. Female flowers yield fruits which are ribbed achenes, each with a fuzzy body 2–3 millimetres (0.08–0.12 in) long and a pappus about 5 millimetres (0.20 in) long.
