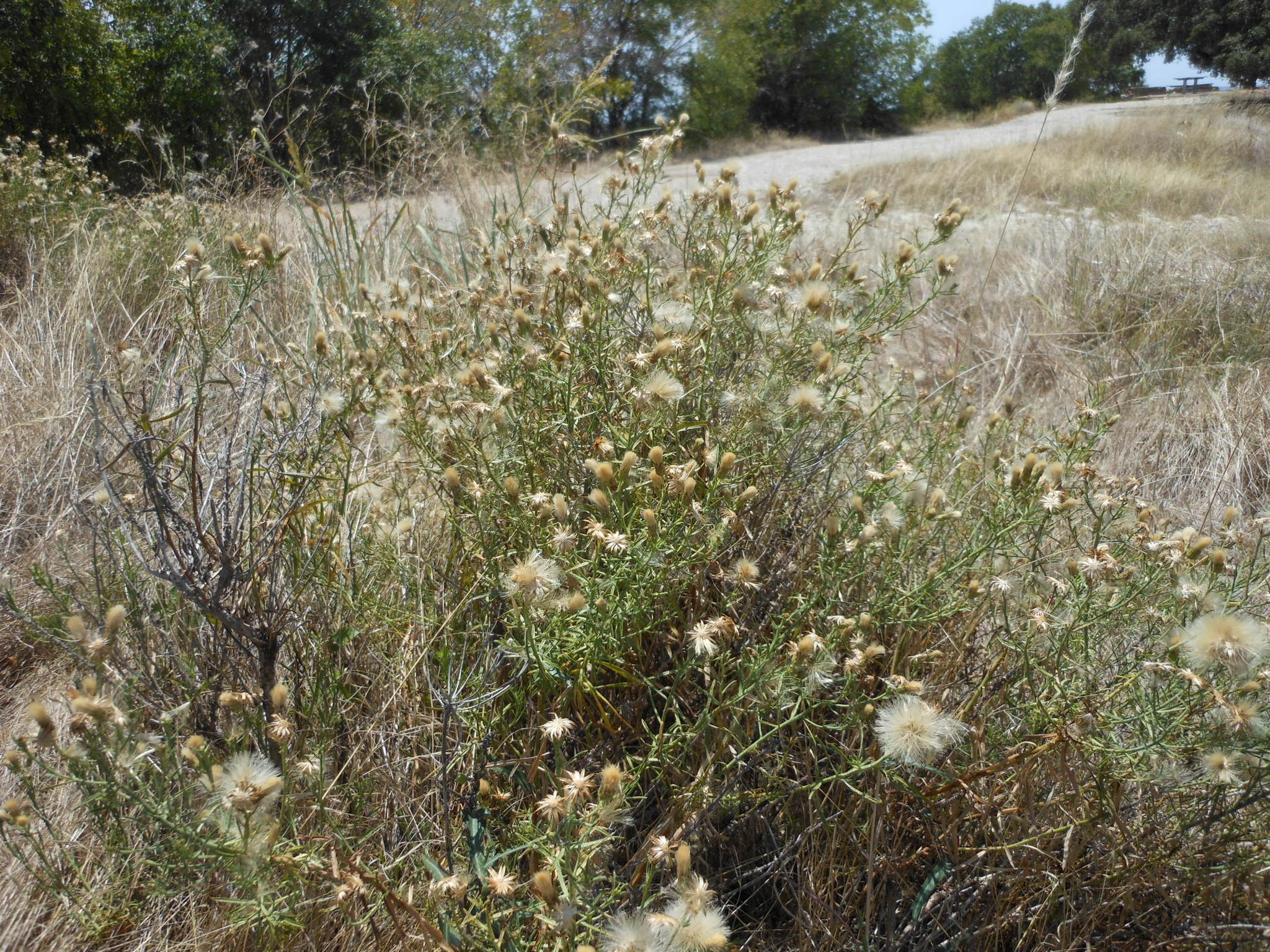

Scientific classification
- Kingdom: Plantae
- Clade: Tracheophytes
- Clade: Angiosperms
- Clade: Eudicots
- Clade: Asterids
- Order: Asterales
- Family: Asteraceae
- Genus: Baccharis
- Species: B. texana

Binomial name
- Baccharis texana (Torr. & A. Gray) A. Gray

Synonyms
- Linosyris texana (A.Gray) Torr. & A.Gray; Neomolina texana (A.Gray) F.H.Hellw.

= Baccharis texana =

Species of flowering plant

Baccharis texana is a North American species of shrubs in the family Asteraceae known by the common name prairie baccharis or false willow. It is native to northeastern Mexico (Coahuila, Nuevo León, Tamaulipas) and to the southern part of the Great Plains of the United States (Texas, Oklahoma, New Mexico).

Baccharis texana is a shrub or subshrub up to 60 cm (2 feet) tall, with narrow leaves and many small flower heads. It grows in grasslands, hillsides, and mesas.
