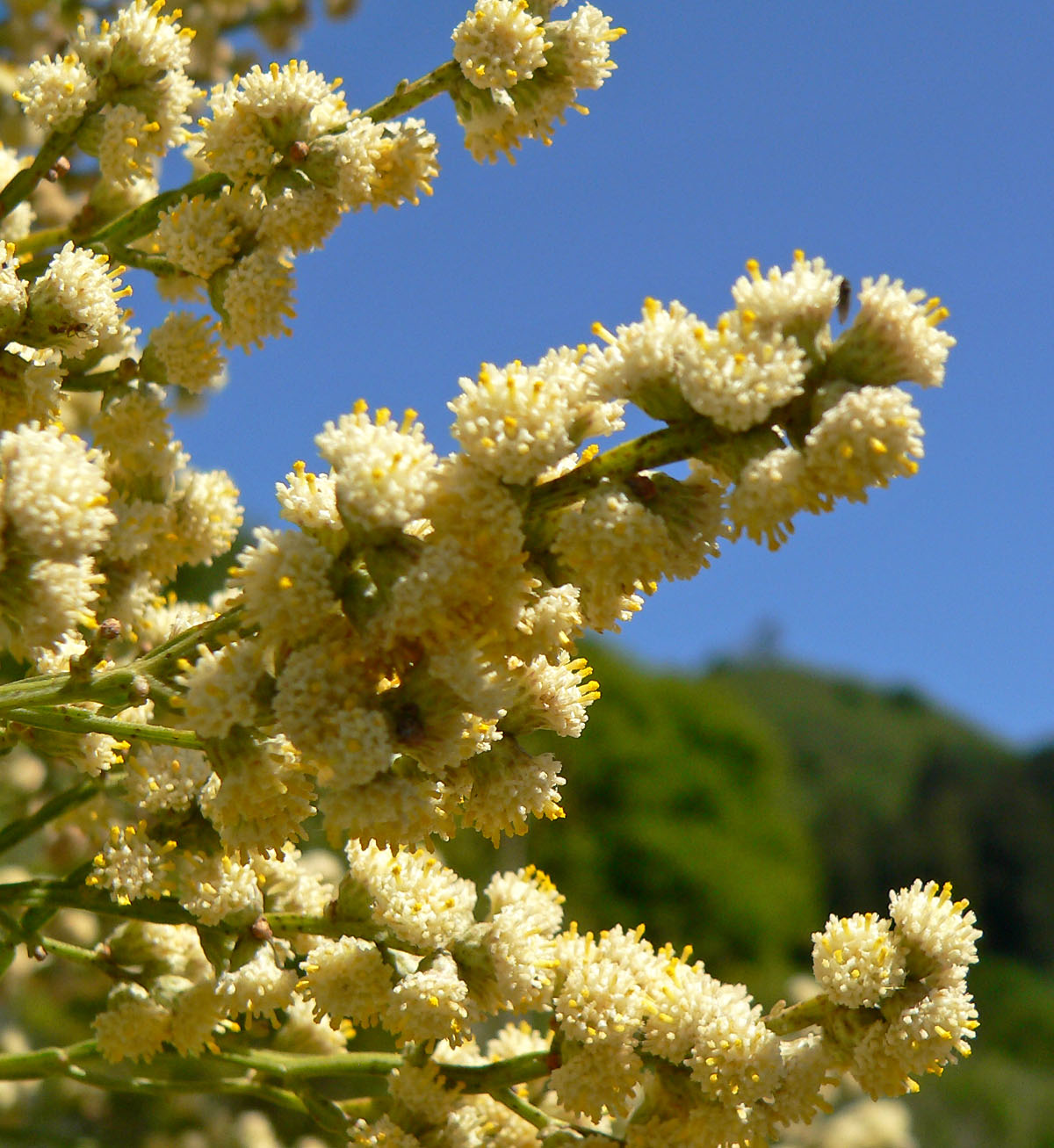

Scientific classification
- Kingdom: Plantae
- Clade: Tracheophytes
- Clade: Angiosperms
- Clade: Eudicots
- Clade: Asterids
- Order: Asterales
- Family: Asteraceae
- Genus: Baccharis
- Species: B. articulata

Binomial name
- Baccharis articulata (Lam.) Pers.

Synonyms
- Baccharis diptera Sch.Bip. ex Baker; Cacalia sessilis Vell.; Conyza articulata Lam.; Molina articulata Less.; Pingraea articulata (Lam.) F.H.Hellw.

= Baccharis articulata =

Species of flowering plant in the daisy family

Baccharis articulata is a species of shrub in the family Asteraceae. also known as carqueja.

The species was first described by Jean-Baptiste Lamarck, but was later reclassified by Christiaan Hendrik Persoon in 1807. The species is used for a variety of medical uses and is also native to parts of South America.

== Medical uses ==
It is used in traditional folk medicine for liver diseases. It has also been traditionally used to treat digestive disorders and urinary infections. In Brazil the plant is used to treat diarrhea in cattle.

== Distribution ==
It is native to Argentina, Bolivia, Brazil, Paraguay, and Uruguay. It can be found in the Paranaese forest. It was also introduced to Spain.

== Flowers ==
Like almost all baccharis species, Baccharis articulata is dioecious with unisexual flowers. The flowers are visited by Discodon, Apis mellifera, Lucilia sericata, and Ruizantheda divaricata.

In August and September, the plant has multi-petal flowers which are pale greenish yellow.

== Common names ==
In Portuguese, the species goes by the common name carqueja-branca, carqueja-doce, and carquejinha.

In English, it goes by the common name salt water false willow.
