= Baccharis klattii =

Conservation status
- Near Threatened (IUCN 3.1)

Scientific classification
- Kingdom: Plantae
- Clade: Tracheophytes
- Clade: Angiosperms
- Clade: Eudicots
- Clade: Asterids
- Order: Asterales
- Family: Asteraceae
- Genus: Baccharis
- Species: B. klattii

Binomial name
- Baccharis klattii Benoist

Synonyms
- Baccharis filifolia Sch.Bip. ex Baker; Baccharis polyphylla Klatt 1894 not Gardner 1848; Baccharis pseudopolyphylla Malag.

Species of flowering plant

Baccharis klattii is a species of flowering plant in the family Asteraceae that is endemic to Ecuador. Its natural habitats are subtropical or tropical moist montane forests and subtropical or tropical high-altitude shrubland. It is threatened by habitat loss.
