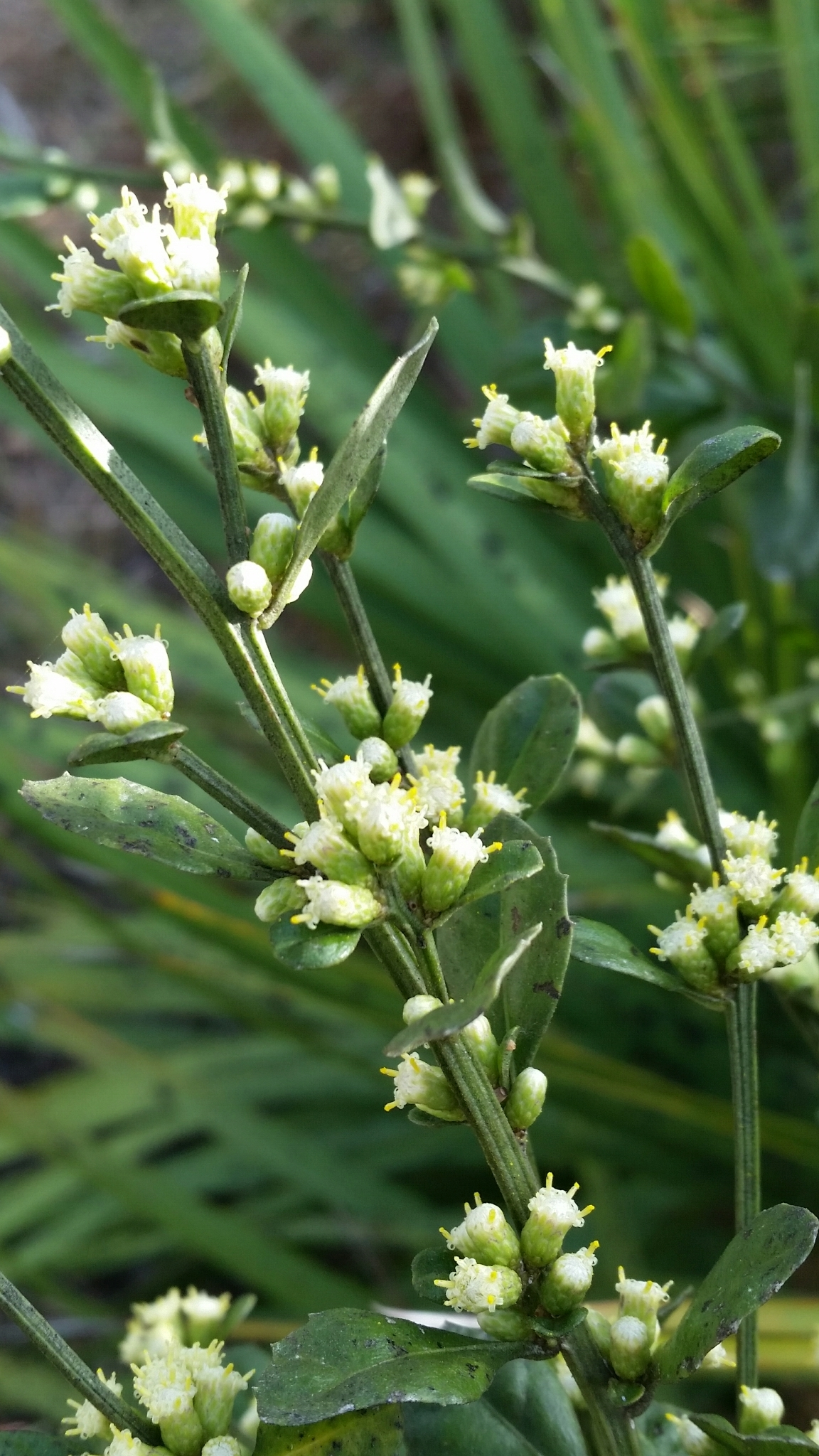

Scientific classification
- Kingdom: Plantae
- Clade: Tracheophytes
- Clade: Angiosperms
- Clade: Eudicots
- Clade: Asterids
- Order: Asterales
- Family: Asteraceae
- Genus: Baccharis
- Species: B. glomeruliflora

Binomial name
- Baccharis glomeruliflora Pers.

Synonyms
- Baccharis glomeruliflora f. cubensis Heering; Baccharis sessiliflora Michx. 1803 not Vahl 1794

= Baccharis glomeruliflora =

Species of flowering plant

Baccharis glomeruliflora, commonly known as silverling, is a species of shrub in the family Asteraceae. It is native to the coastal plain of the south-eastern United States, from Mississippi to North Carolina.

Baccharis glomeruliflora is a shrub up to 300 cm (10 feet) tall. It has thick, leathery, evergreen leaves with large teeth, and flower heads clumped together in the axils of the leaves. It grows in swamps, hammocks, riverbanks, and other wet habitats.
