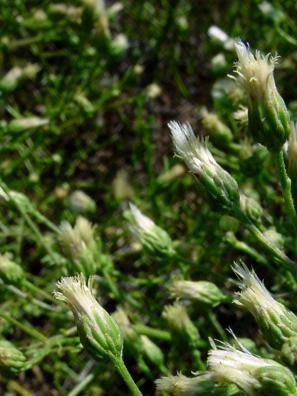

Conservation status
- Threatened (ESA)

Scientific classification
- Kingdom: Plantae
- Clade: Tracheophytes
- Clade: Angiosperms
- Clade: Eudicots
- Clade: Asterids
- Order: Asterales
- Family: Asteraceae
- Genus: Baccharis
- Species: B. vanessae

Binomial name
- Baccharis vanessae R.M.Beauch.

= Baccharis vanessae =

Species of flowering plant

Baccharis vanessae is a rare California species of Baccharis known by the common name Encinitas baccharis. It is native primarily to San Diego County, California, almost endemic to the county except for one population a few miles over the county line in Riverside County. It is a member of the chaparral flora. It is a federally listed threatened species. It is present in several sites in Encinitas, and it is known from other parts of the county from the coastline to the mountains on various substrates. There are perhaps 15 populations remaining, for a total of about 2000 individuals. Some of the remaining occurrences are on land which may be cleared for development.

== Description ==
Baccharis vanessae is a sticky, glandular shrub producing dense, branching, erect stems approaching 2 meters in maximum height. The leaves are linear and up to 4.5 centimetres (1.8 in) long. This dioecious shrub produces female and male flower heads on different individuals. The fruit is an achene with a pappus up to a centimeter long. Often found are elongated lepidopteran galls which Oscar Clarke of Riverside suggests indicates a very old relationship of evolution.

== Conservation ==
Habitat destruction is a threat to the species. Fire suppression in the fire-prone chaparral habitat threaten those plants occurring near residential areas. Introduced species of plants have altered the local plant community. Some of the populations are very small, made up of just a few individuals, reducing their genetic viability.

The species name vanessae honors Vanessa Beth Beauchamp, first daughter of the botanist who first described the species and who is currently an associate professor of biology at Towson University in Maryland.

== See also ==
- California chaparral and woodlands
- California coastal sage and chaparral ecoregion
- California montane chaparral and woodlands
