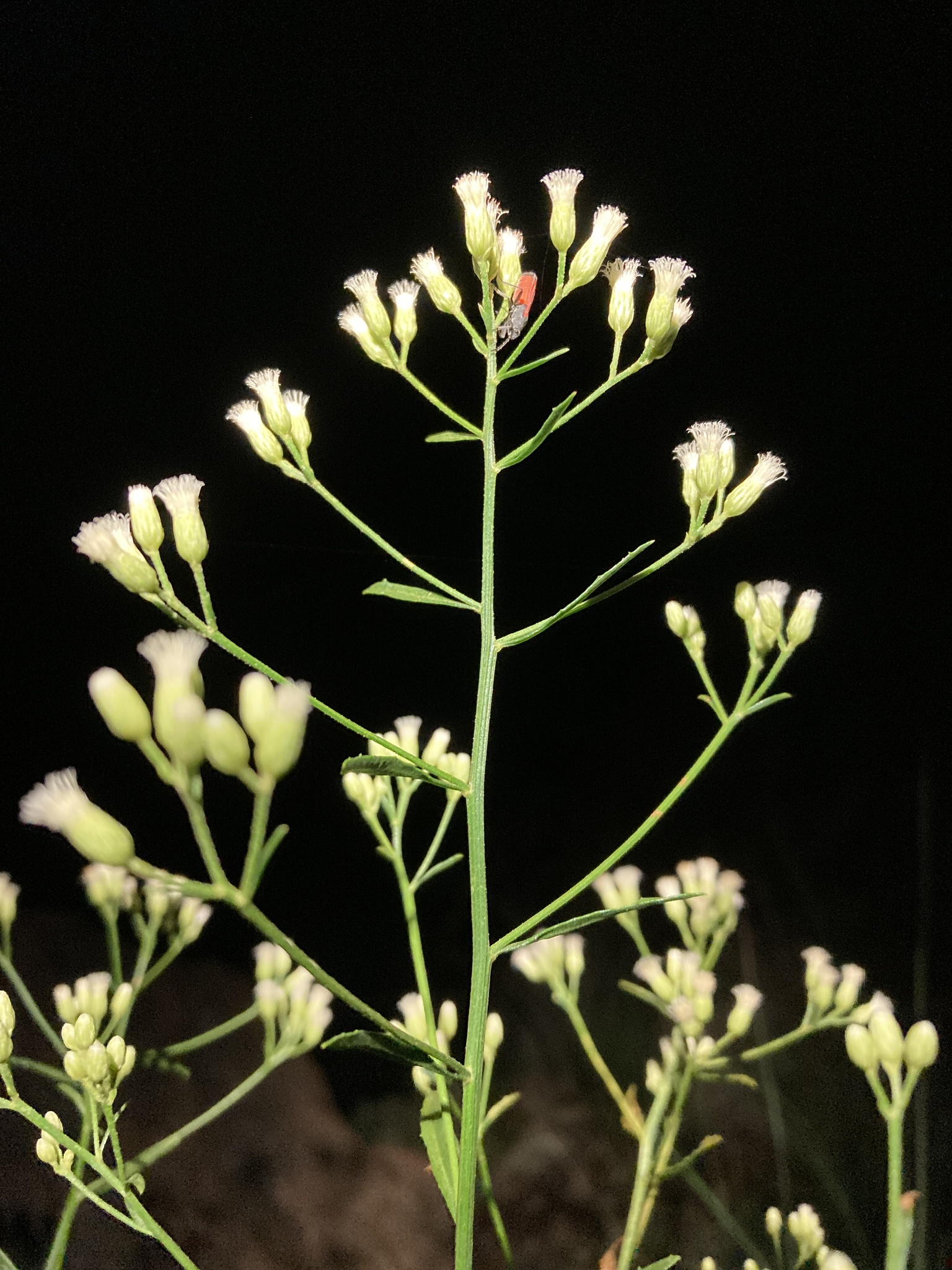

Conservation status
- Apparently Secure (NatureServe)

Scientific classification
- Kingdom: Plantae
- Clade: Tracheophytes
- Clade: Angiosperms
- Clade: Eudicots
- Clade: Asterids
- Order: Asterales
- Family: Asteraceae
- Genus: Baccharis
- Species: B. thesioides

Binomial name
- Baccharis thesioides Kunth

Synonyms
- Neomolina thesioides (Kunth) F.H.Hellw.

= Baccharis thesioides =

Species of flowering plant

Baccharis thesioides is a North American species of shrubs in the family Asteraceae known by the common name Arizona baccharis. It is widespread in Mexico from Chihuahua to Oaxaca, and also found in the southwestern United States (Arizona + New Mexico).

Baccharis thesioides is a branching shrub up to 200 cm (80 inches) tall. It grows in mountains and canyons in pine-oak forests.
