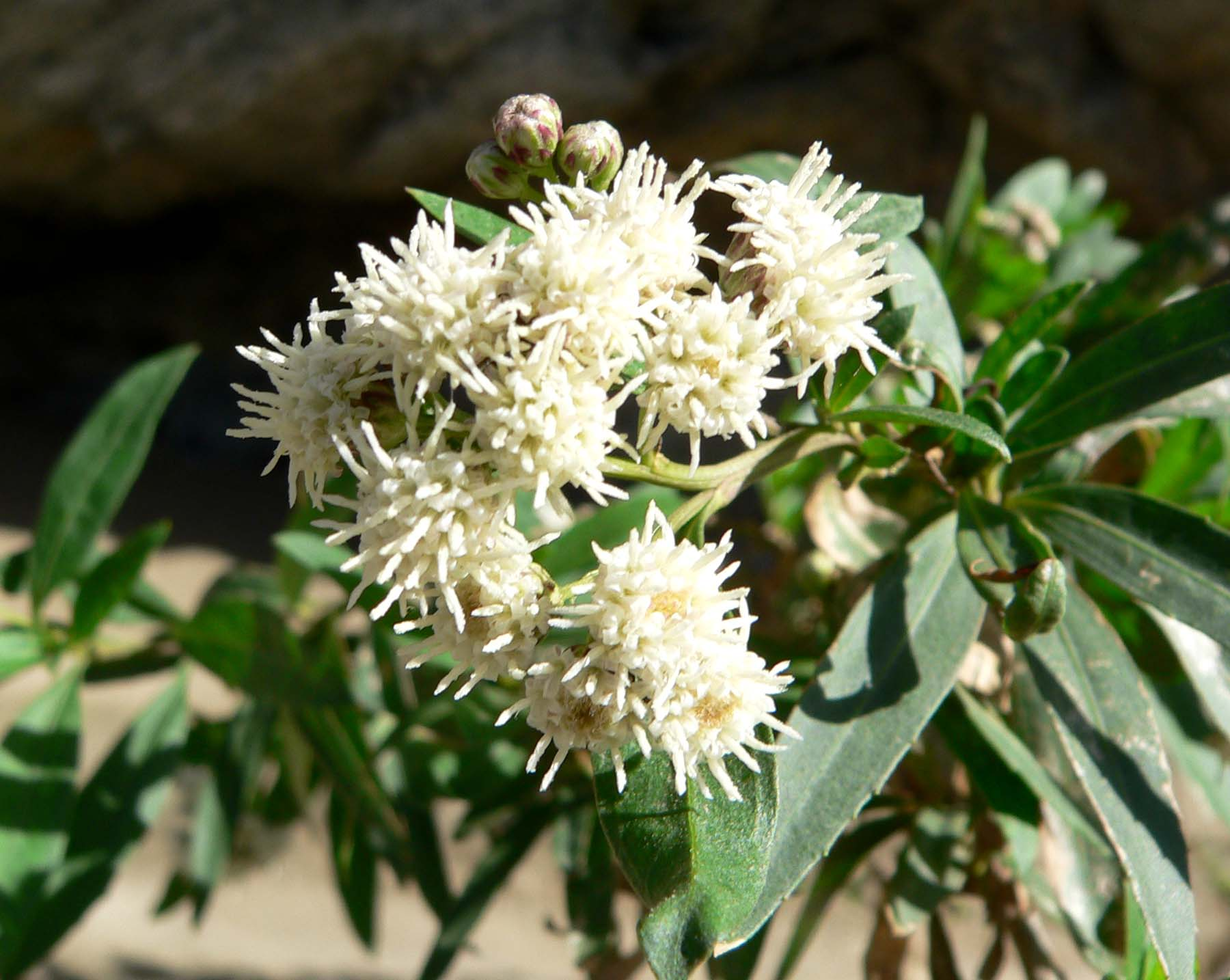

Conservation status
- Least Concern (IUCN 3.1)

- Secure (NatureServe)

Scientific classification
- Kingdom: Plantae
- Clade: Embryophytes
- Clade: Tracheophytes
- Clade: Spermatophytes
- Clade: Angiosperms
- Clade: Eudicots
- Clade: Asterids
- Order: Asterales
- Family: Asteraceae
- Genus: Baccharis
- Species: B. salicifolia

Binomial name
- Baccharis salicifolia (Ruiz & Pav.) Pers.

Synonyms
- Molina salicifolia Ruiz & Pav.; Pingraea salicifolia (Ruiz & Pav.) F.H.Hellw.

= Baccharis salicifolia =

Mule fat

Species of flowering plant

Baccharis salicifolia is a blooming shrub native to the sage scrub community and desert southwest of the United States and northern Mexico, as well as parts of South America. Its usual common name is mule fat; it is also called seepwillow or water-wally. This is a large bush with sticky foliage which bears plentiful small, fuzzy, pink, or red-tinged white flowers which are highly attractive to butterflies. It is a host plant for the larval stage of the fatal metalmark butterfly, and the adult stage also nectars on the flowers.

The long pointed leaves may be toothed and contain three lengthwise veins. It is most common near water sources.

The seed is wind-distributed.

== Uses ==
The Kayenta Navajo people use this plant in a compound infusion of plants used as a lotion for chills from immersion.

Another use is fire starting. Dried Baccharis salicifolia has a very low ignition temperature, very similar to the dried yucca stalk. It can be used for spindles and hand-drill shafts.

== Galls ==
Mulefat plays host to several gall-inducing insect species including Aceria baccharices.
