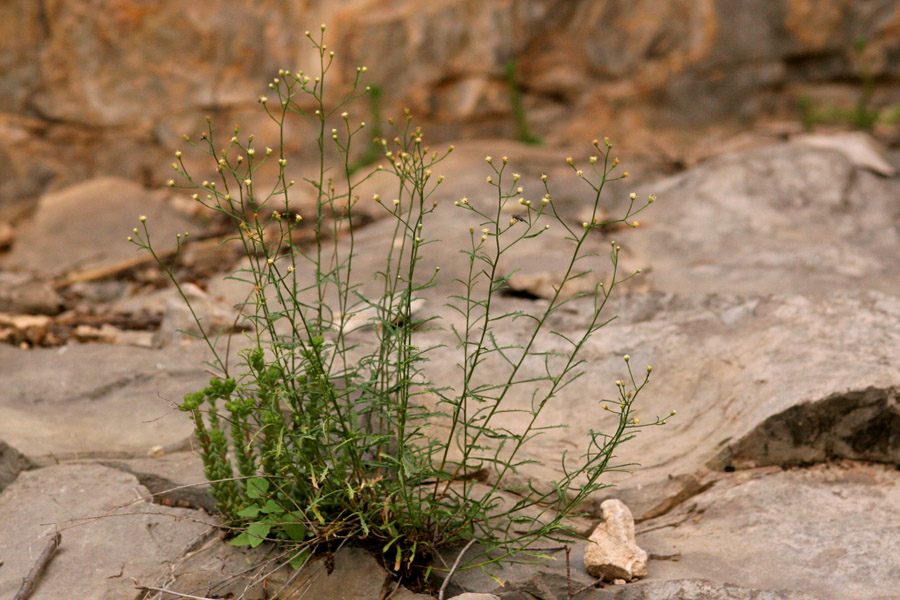

Scientific classification
- Kingdom: Plantae
- Clade: Embryophytes
- Clade: Tracheophytes
- Clade: Spermatophytes
- Clade: Angiosperms
- Clade: Eudicots
- Clade: Asterids
- Order: Asterales
- Family: Asteraceae
- Genus: Baccharis
- Species: B. havardii

Binomial name
- Baccharis havardii A.Gray

= Baccharis havardii =

Species of flowering plant

Baccharis havardii is a North American species of shrubs in the family Asteraceae known by the common name Havard's false willow. It is native to Chihuahua, southern New Mexico, and western Texas.

Baccharis havardii is a branching shrub up to 70 cm (28 inches) tall. It has narrow leaves and many small flower heads. It grows on dry, rocky slopes in mountains such as the Guadelupe, Davis, and Chisos Ranges.

The species is named for French-American botanist and career army officer Valery Havard (1846 – 1927).
