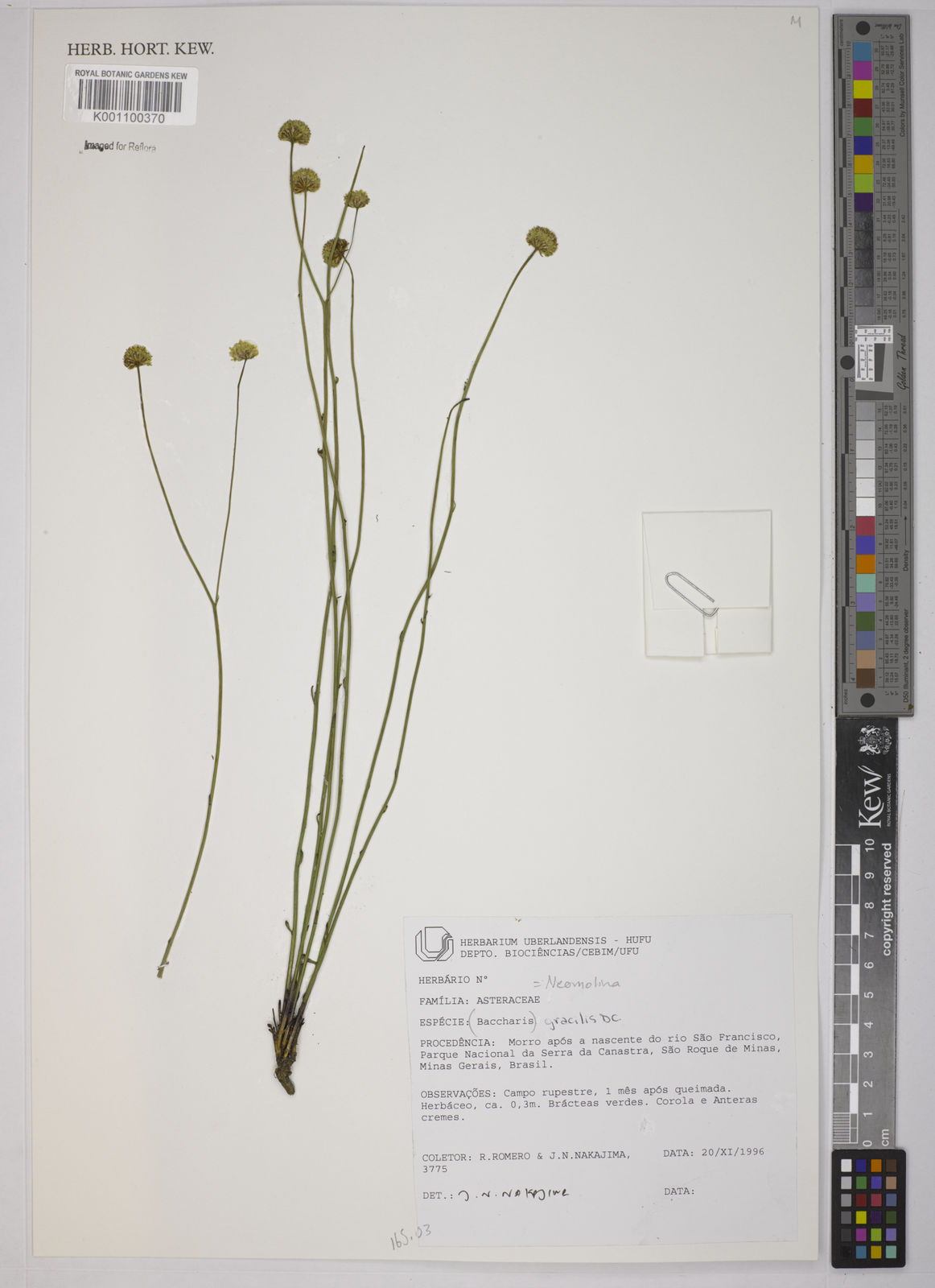

Scientific classification
- Kingdom: Plantae
- Clade: Tracheophytes
- Clade: Angiosperms
- Clade: Eudicots
- Clade: Asterids
- Order: Asterales
- Family: Asteraceae
- Genus: Baccharis
- Species: B. gracilis

Binomial name
- Baccharis gracilis DC.

= Baccharis gracilis =

Species of plant

Baccharis gracilis, formerly known as Neomolina gracilis, is a plant in the family Asteraceae which is native to Brazil and Paraguay.
