= Baccharis hieronymi =

Conservation status
- Vulnerable (IUCN 3.1)

Scientific classification
- Kingdom: Plantae
- Clade: Tracheophytes
- Clade: Angiosperms
- Clade: Eudicots
- Clade: Asterids
- Order: Asterales
- Family: Asteraceae
- Genus: Baccharis
- Species: B. hieronymi

Binomial name
- Baccharis hieronymi Heering

Synonyms
- Baccharis pseudospicata Malag.; Baccharis spicata Hieron. March 1901 not (Lam.) Baill. Jan 1901

Species of flowering plant

Baccharis hieronymi is a species of flowering plant in the family Asteraceae. It is found only in Ecuador. It grows in subtropical or tropical moist montane forests and subtropical or tropical high-altitude shrubland. It is threatened by habitat loss.
