= Baccharis dioica =

Conservation status
- Least Concern (IUCN 3.1)

Scientific classification
- Kingdom: Plantae
- Clade: Tracheophytes
- Clade: Angiosperms
- Clade: Eudicots
- Clade: Asterids
- Order: Asterales
- Family: Asteraceae
- Genus: Baccharis
- Species: B. dioica

Binomial name
- Baccharis dioica Vahl

Synonyms
- Baccharis rohriana Spreng.; Baccharis vahlii DC.

Species of flowering plant

Baccharis dioica is a North American species of shrubs in the family Asteraceae known by the common name broombush falsewillow. It is native to Florida, the Yucatán Peninsula, and the West Indies (Bahamas, Greater Antilles, Virgin Islands, Montserrat).

Baccharis dioica is a shrub sometimes as much as 300 cm (10 feet) tall. It grows in hammocks, on dunes, and in mangrove swamps.
