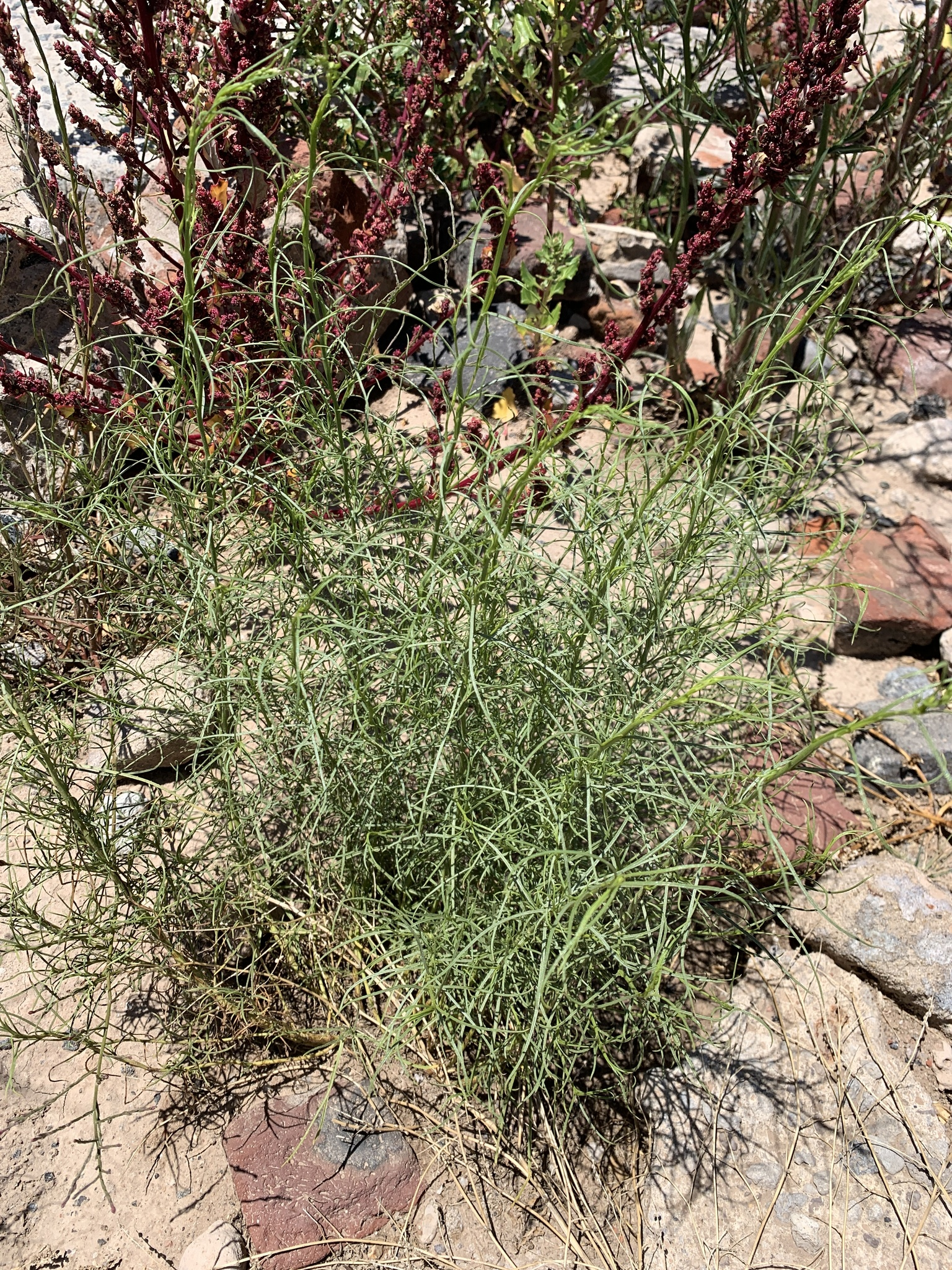

Scientific classification
- Kingdom: Plantae
- Clade: Tracheophytes
- Clade: Angiosperms
- Clade: Eudicots
- Clade: Asterids
- Order: Asterales
- Family: Asteraceae
- Genus: Baccharis
- Species: B. albida

Binomial name
- Baccharis albida Hook. & Arn.

= Baccharis albida =

Species of plant

Baccharis albida is a species of flowering plant in the family Asteraceae and is an endemic to Argentina.

Baccharis albida is a perennial shrub that grows up to 1.7 metres high. The plant grows between 0 and 500 metres elevation and is found in the following provinces of Argentina: Buenos Aires, Chaco, Corrientes, Entre Ríos and Santa Fe.
