= Baccharis bigelovii =

Conservation status
- Apparently Secure (NatureServe)

Scientific classification
- Kingdom: Plantae
- Clade: Embryophytes
- Clade: Tracheophytes
- Clade: Spermatophytes
- Clade: Angiosperms
- Clade: Eudicots
- Clade: Asterids
- Order: Asterales
- Family: Asteraceae
- Genus: Baccharis
- Species: B. bigelovii

Binomial name
- Baccharis bigelovii A.Gray

Synonyms
- Baccharis ptarmicifolia DC.; Neomolina bigelovii (A.Gray) F.H.Hellw.; Neomolina ptarmicaefolia (DC.) F.H.Hellw.; Neomolina ptarmicifolia (DC.) F.H.Hellw.

Species of flowering plant

Baccharis bigelovii is a North American species of shrubs in the family Asteraceae known by the common name Bigelow's false willow. It is found in the Chihuahuan Desert and nearby regions of the United States and Mexico, in the States of Chihuahua, Durango, Sonora, Arizona, New Mexico, and Texas.

Baccharis bigelovii is a shrub up to 100 cm (40 inches) tall, branching from the base. It produces many small flower heads. The plant grows on rocky ground in coniferous forests.
