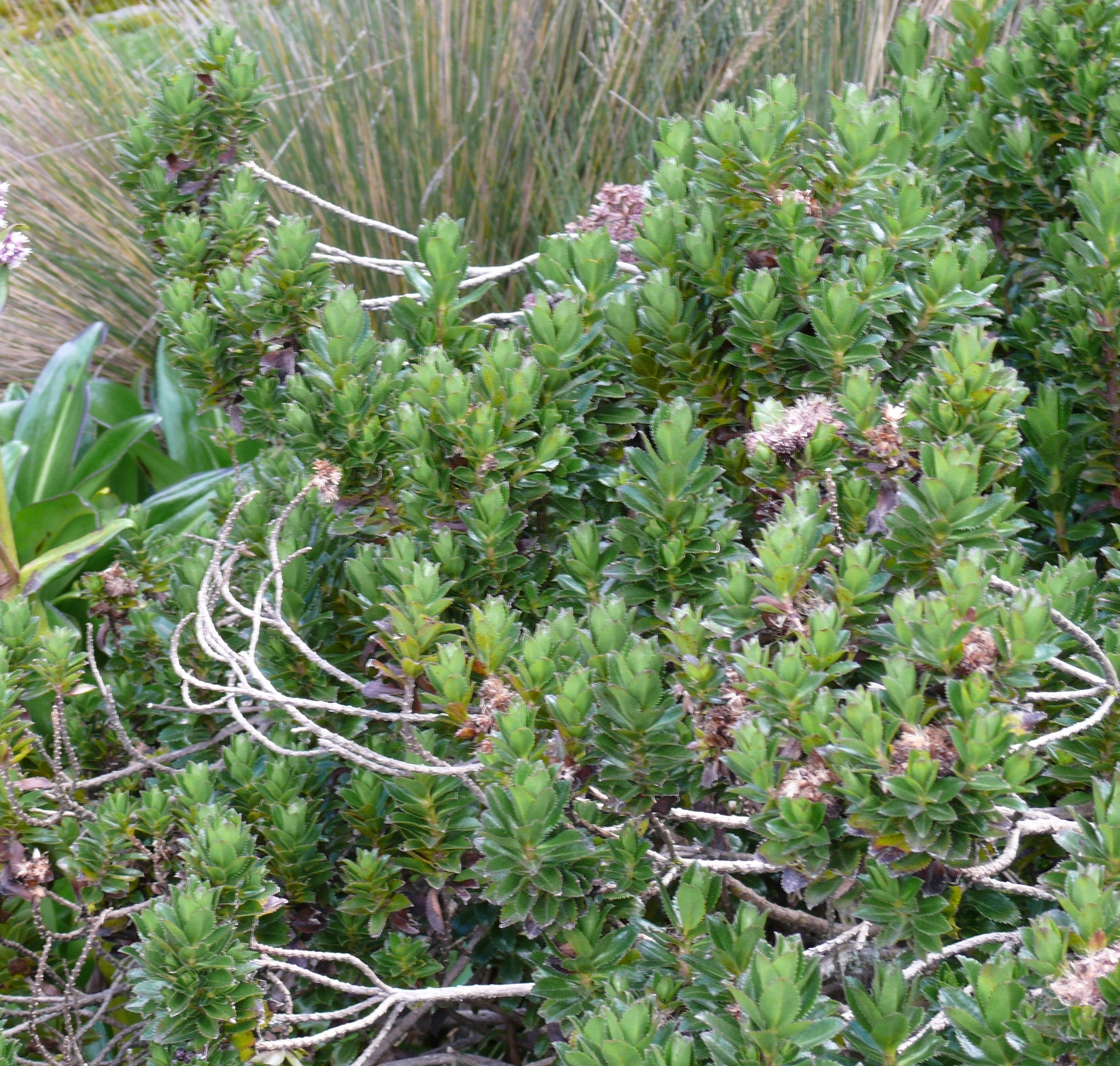
- Near Quito, Ecuador

Conservation status
- Near Threatened (IUCN 3.1)

Scientific classification
- Kingdom: Plantae
- Clade: Tracheophytes
- Clade: Angiosperms
- Clade: Eudicots
- Clade: Asterids
- Order: Asterales
- Family: Asteraceae
- Genus: Baccharis
- Species: B. arbutifolia

Binomial name
- Baccharis arbutifolia Vahl 1794 not (Lam.) Kunth 1818

Synonyms
- Conyza arbutifolia Lam.

= Baccharis arbutifolia =

Species of plant

Baccharis arbutifolia is a species of flowering plant in the family Asteraceae found only in Ecuador. Its natural habitats are subtropical or tropical moist montane forests and subtropical or tropical high-altitude shrubland.

It is threatened by habitat loss.
