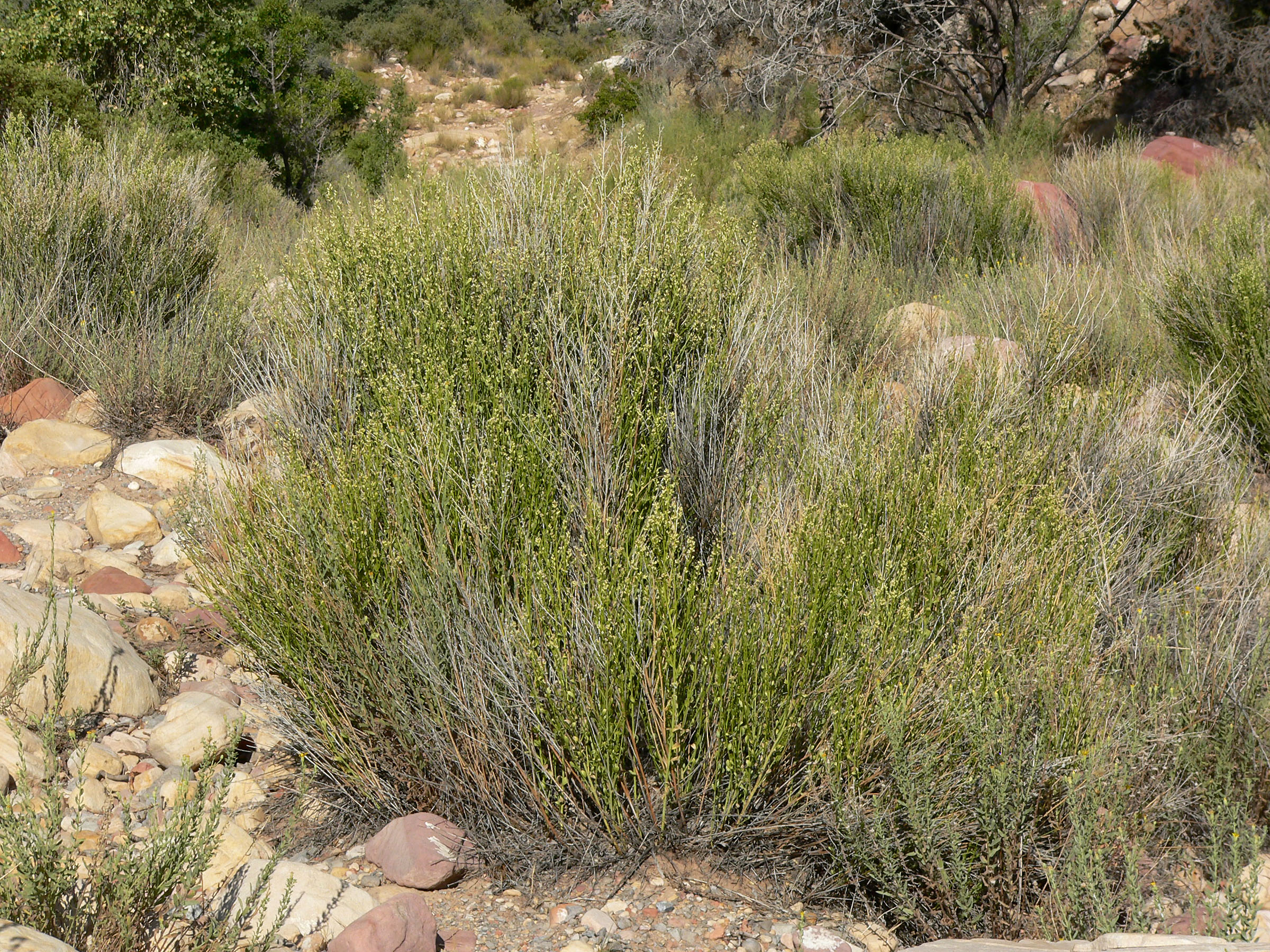
- Desert baccharis in the Mojave Desert

Conservation status
- Secure (NatureServe)

Scientific classification
- Kingdom: Plantae
- Clade: Embryophytes
- Clade: Tracheophytes
- Clade: Spermatophytes
- Clade: Angiosperms
- Clade: Eudicots
- Clade: Asterids
- Order: Asterales
- Family: Asteraceae
- Genus: Baccharis
- Species: B. sergiloides

Binomial name
- Baccharis sergiloides A.Gray

= Baccharis sergiloides =

Species of flowering plant

Baccharis sergiloides is a species of Baccharis known by the common name desert baccharis.

== Distribution ==
The plant is native to the Southwestern United States and Northwestern Mexico, where it grows in wet areas in dry desert and woodland habitat, such as streambeds. It is found in the Mojave Desert and Sonoran Deserts in the States of California, Nevada, Utah, Arizona, Sonora, and Baja California.

== Description ==
Baccharis sergiloides is a shrub producing many erect, branching stems approaching 2 m (6 ft) in maximum height.

The leaves are mostly oval shape and up to about 3 centimetres (1.2 in) long. The leaves generally fall by the time the plant blooms.

The shrub is dioecious, with male and female plants producing flower heads of different types. The head is enclosed in a layer of phyllaries which are glandular and sticky.

The fruit is a ribbed achene with a pappus a few millimeters long.

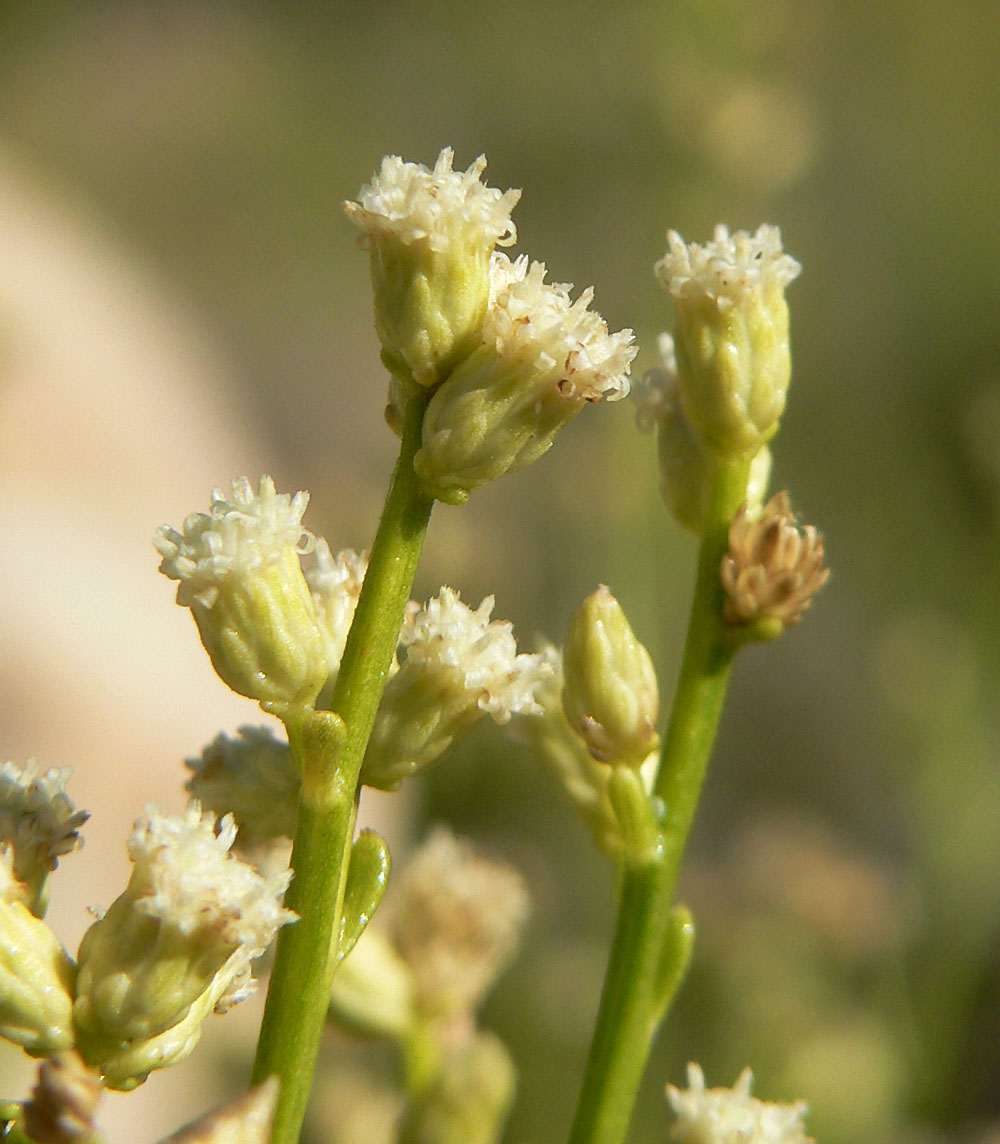
Close-up of flowers.
