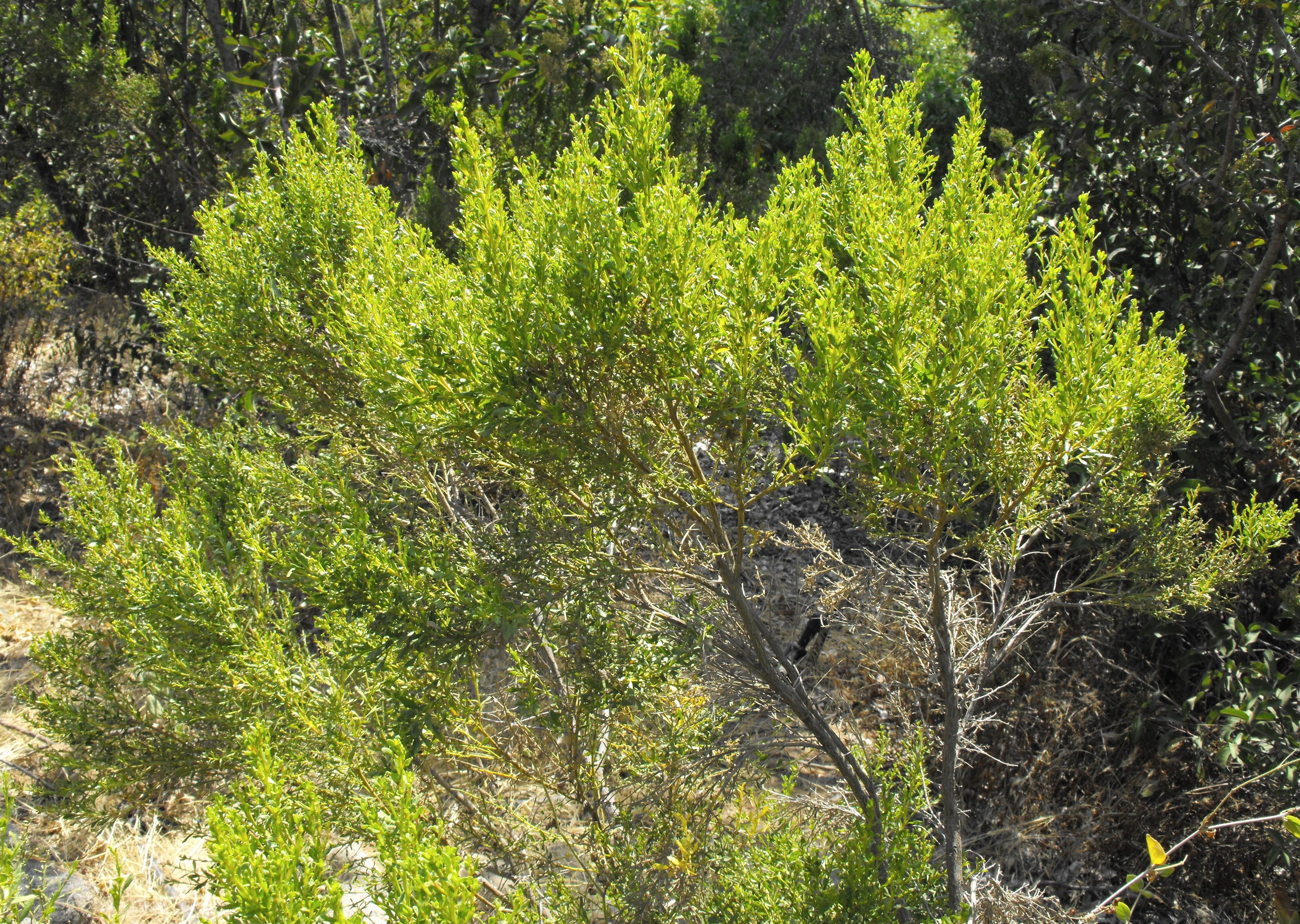

Scientific classification
- Kingdom: Plantae
- Clade: Tracheophytes
- Clade: Angiosperms
- Clade: Eudicots
- Clade: Asterids
- Order: Asterales
- Family: Asteraceae
- Genus: Baccharis
- Species: B. sarothroides

Binomial name
- Baccharis sarothroides A.Gray

= Baccharis sarothroides =

Species of flowering plant

Baccharis sarothroides is a North American species of flowering shrub known by the common names broom baccharis, desertbroom, greasewood, rosin-bush and groundsel in English and "escoba amarga" or "romerillo" in Spanish. This is a spreading, woody shrub usually sticky with glandular secretions along the primarily leafless green stems. The small, thick leaves are a few centimeters long and are absent much of the year, giving the shrub a spindly, twiggy appearance. It flowers abundantly with tiny green blooms.

Native to the Sonoran Desert of northwestern Mexico (Baja California, Baja California Sur, Sinaloa, Sonora) and the Southwestern United States (southern California, Arizona, New Mexico, western Texas), it is common in gravelly dry soils and disturbed areas.

== Uses ==
The Seri refer to desert broom as cascol caaco, and make a decoction by cooking the twigs. This drink is used to treat colds, sinus headache, and general sore achey ailments. The same tea is also used as a rub for sore muscles.

Studies done on plant extracts show that desert broom is rich in leutolin, a flavonoid that has demonstrated anti-inflammatory, antioxidant, and cholesterol lowering capabilities. Desert broom also has quercetin, a proven antioxidant, and apigenin a chemical which binds to the same brain receptor sites that Valium does. However many members of the Sunflower family also contain compounds that cause negative side effects, thus caution is advised until this plant is more extensively tested.

== Planting and care ==
Most people try to get rid of this plant, but it will grow in heavy clay or saline soils. The tall, bushy shrub has green stems and twigs and highly reduced leaves. It will accept shearing and can be trained into a decent, short-lived privacy hedge, useful while the longer-lived, taller, but slower growing Arizona rosewood gets established. Plants may be purchased at nurseries and planted in place. Avoid overwatering in heavy soils as desert broom will drown.
