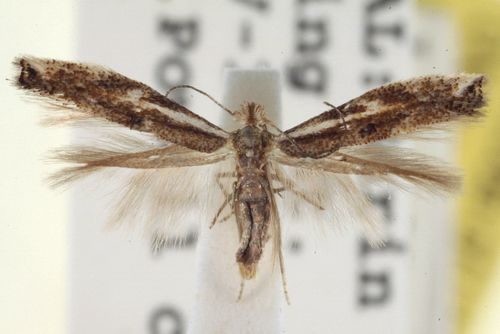

Scientific classification
- Kingdom: Animalia
- Phylum: Arthropoda
- Clade: Pancrustacea
- Class: Insecta
- Order: Lepidoptera
- Family: Bucculatricidae
- Genus: Bucculatrix
- Species: B. dominatrix

Binomial name
- Bucculatrix dominatrix Rubinoff & Osborne, 1997

= Bucculatrix dominatrix =

Species of moth

Bucculatrix dominatrix is a moth in the family Bucculatricidae. It is found in North America, where it has been recorded from coastal central California. It was described in 1997 by Daniel Z. Rubinoff and Kendall H. Osborne.

Adults have been recorded on wing from April to June.

The larvae feed on Baccharis pilularis.
