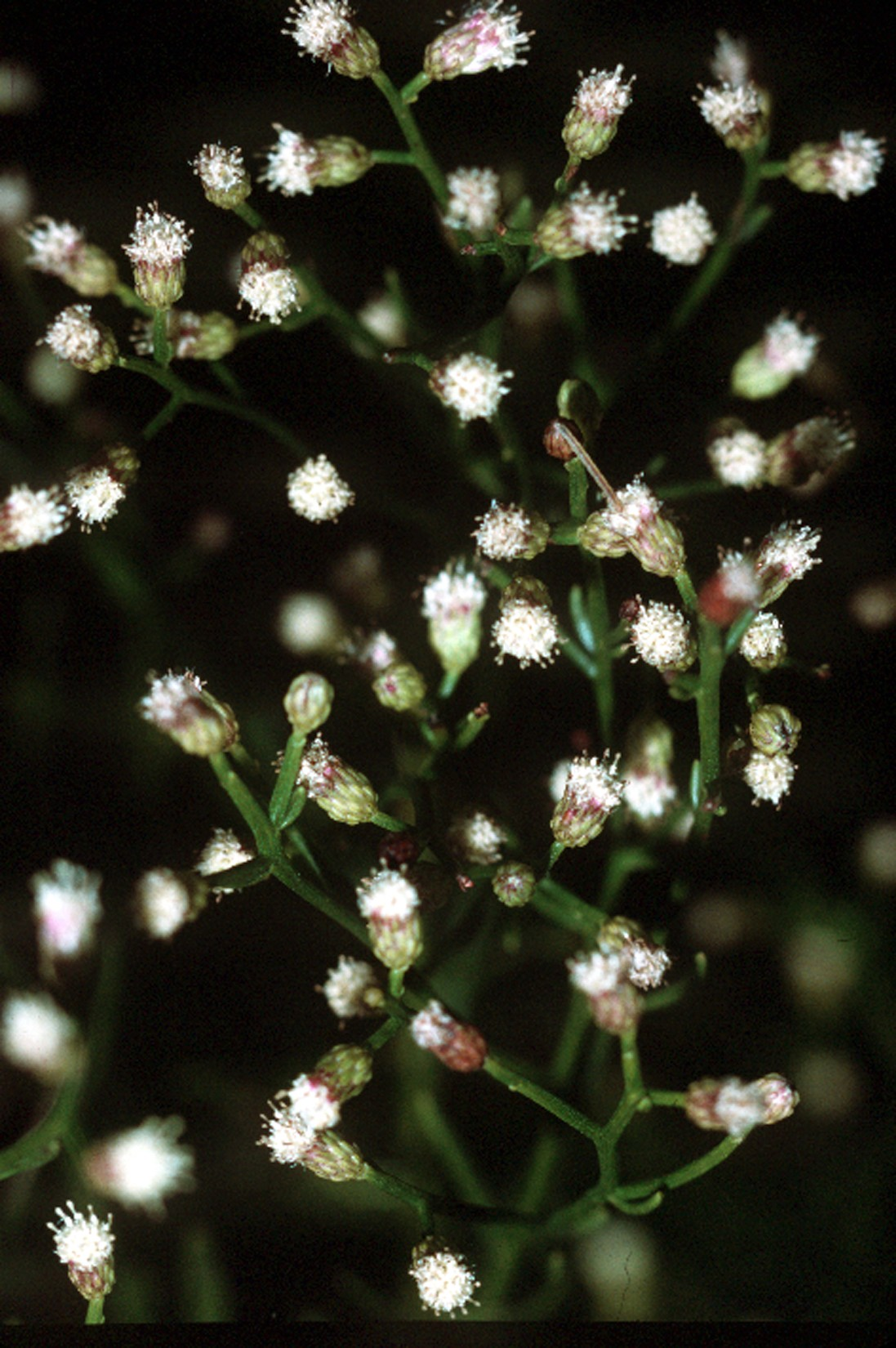
- B. angustifolia flowers

Scientific classification
- Kingdom: Plantae
- Clade: Embryophytes
- Clade: Tracheophytes
- Clade: Spermatophytes
- Clade: Angiosperms
- Clade: Eudicots
- Clade: Asterids
- Order: Asterales
- Family: Asteraceae
- Genus: Baccharis
- Species: B. angustifolia

Binomial name
- Baccharis angustifolia Michx.
- It is native to the Bahamas and the southeastern USA

= Baccharis angustifolia =

Species of flowering plant

Baccharis angustifolia (most commonly known as saltwater false willow or just false willow) is a species of North American plants in the family Asteraceae. It is native to the Southeastern United States from Louisiana to North Carolina.

== Description ==
Baccharis angustifolia is a shrub sometimes as much as 400 cm (13 ft) tall, with narrow, succulent leaves up to 6 cm (2.4 in) long. It is found on streambanks, in hammocks, and on coastal sand dunes.

== Distribution and habitat ==
It is native to the Bahamas and the southeastern USA (Alabama, Florida, Georgia, Louisiana, Mississippi, North Carolina, and South Carolina).
