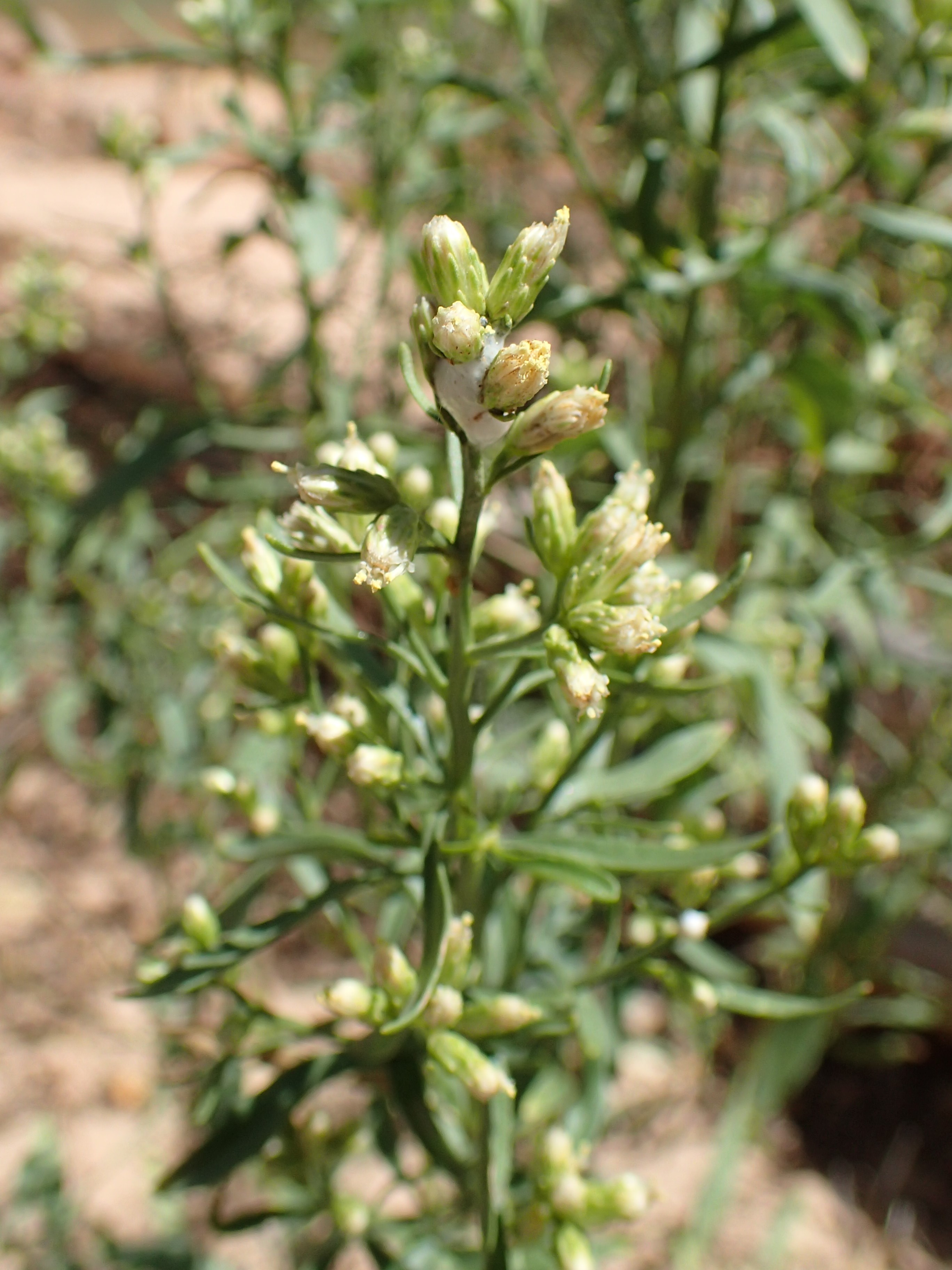

Conservation status
- Secure (NatureServe)

Scientific classification
- Kingdom: Plantae
- Clade: Tracheophytes
- Clade: Angiosperms
- Clade: Eudicots
- Clade: Asterids
- Order: Asterales
- Family: Asteraceae
- Genus: Baccharis
- Species: B. salicina

Binomial name
- Baccharis salicina Torr. & Gray

Synonyms
- Synonymy: Baccharis salicifolia Nutt. 1840, illegitimate homonym not (Ruiz & Pav.) Pers. 1807; Baccharis alamanii DC.; Baccharis araucana Phil.; Baccharis chilquilla DC.; Baccharis corymbosa Meyen; Baccharis cuervi Phil.; Baccharis emoryi A.Gray; Baccharis farinosa Pers. ex Spreng.; Baccharis huydobriana J.Rémy; Baccharis huydobriana Remy; Baccharis iresinoides Kunth; Baccharis kraussei Heering; Baccharis lanceolata Kunth; Baccharis longifolia DC.; Baccharis longipes Kunze ex DC.; Baccharis marginalis DC.; Baccharis medullosa DC.; Baccharis pallida Heering; Baccharis parviflora Ruiz & Pav.; Baccharis parviflora (Ruiz & Pav.) Pers.; Baccharis parviflora Less. ex Schltdl. & Cham.; Baccharis purpurascens Heering; Baccharis viminea DC.; Conyza montevidensis Spreng.; Molina parviflora Ruiz & Pav.; Molina salicifolia Ruiz & Pav.; Pingraea marginalis (DC.) F.H.Hellw.; Pingraea salicifolia (Ruiz & Pav.) F.H.Hellw.

= Baccharis salicina =

Species of flowering plant

Baccharis salicina is a species of plant in the family Asteraceae. Common names include willow baccharis, and Great Plains false willow. It is a shrub found in North America where it grows in mildly saline areas.

== Description ==
Baccharis salicina is a shrub producing erect, branching stems approaching 4 metres (13 ft) in maximum height. The thick leaves are oblong to oval in shape and sometimes have roughly toothed edges. They may be up to 7 centimetres (2.8 in) long. The shrub is dioecious, with male and female plants producing flower heads of different types. The head is enclosed in a layer of phyllaries and the female flowers yield fruits, each an achene with a white pappus about a centimeter long.

The earliest name for the species is Baccharis salicifolia Nutt., coined in 1840. This name, however, had previously been used for some South American material, so the North American plants needed to be renamed as Baccharis salicina.

== Distribution and habitat ==
The plant is native to the United States (southern Great Plains region and Southwestern United States; states of California, Nevada, Arizona, Colorado, Kansas, New Mexico, Oklahoma, Texas, and Utah and northern Mexico (Baja California, Chihuahua, Coahuila, Nuevo León, Durango, Sonora).

The plant grows on open sandy flood plains, most commonly in mildly saline areas.
