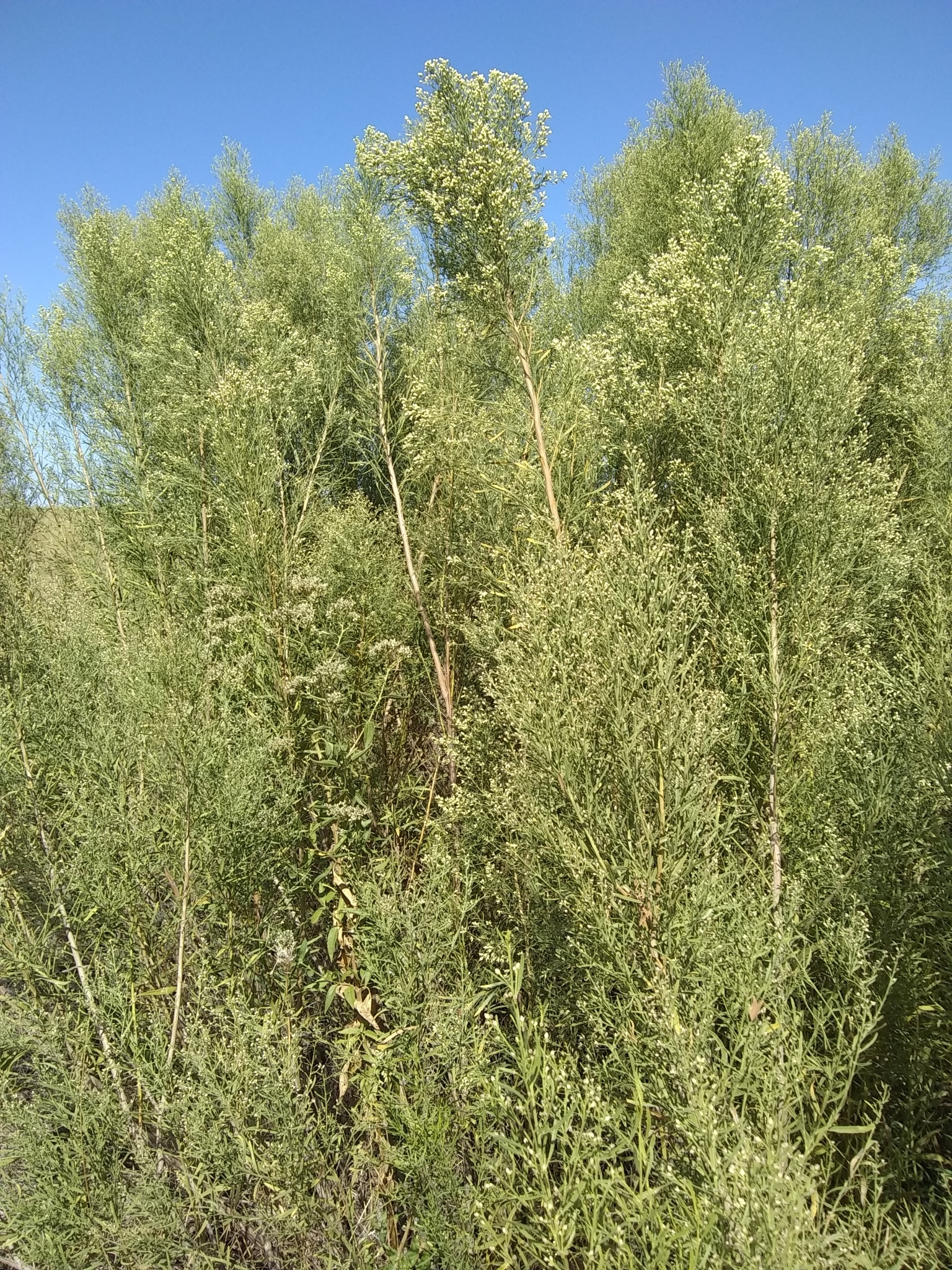

Scientific classification
- Kingdom: Plantae
- Clade: Tracheophytes
- Clade: Angiosperms
- Clade: Eudicots
- Clade: Asterids
- Order: Asterales
- Family: Asteraceae
- Genus: Baccharis
- Species: B. neglecta

Binomial name
- Baccharis neglecta Britt.

= Baccharis neglecta =

Species of flowering plant

Baccharis neglecta (also known as false willow, jara dulce, poverty weed, New Deal weed, and Roosevelt weed) is a species of perennial plant in the family Asteraceae. It is native to northern Mexico (Chihuahua, Coahuila, Nuevo León, San Luis Potosí, Tamaulipas) and the south-western and south-central United States (Arizona, New Mexico, Oklahoma, and Texas).

Baccharis neglecta is a shrub occasionally reaching a height of 450 cm (14.8 ft). The narrow, evergreen leaves are up to 7.5 cm (3.0 in) long. Male and female flowers grow separate plants. Females are distinctive in that the flowers consist of small silky, greenish white heads. The plants are arranged in large clusters up to 1 foot (0.30 m) or more long and 20 cm (7.9 in) wide. Silky plumes start blooming in October and November.
