= Chilean Matorral =

Mediterranean forests, woodlands, and scrub ecoregion in central Chile

Chilean Matorral (NT1201)
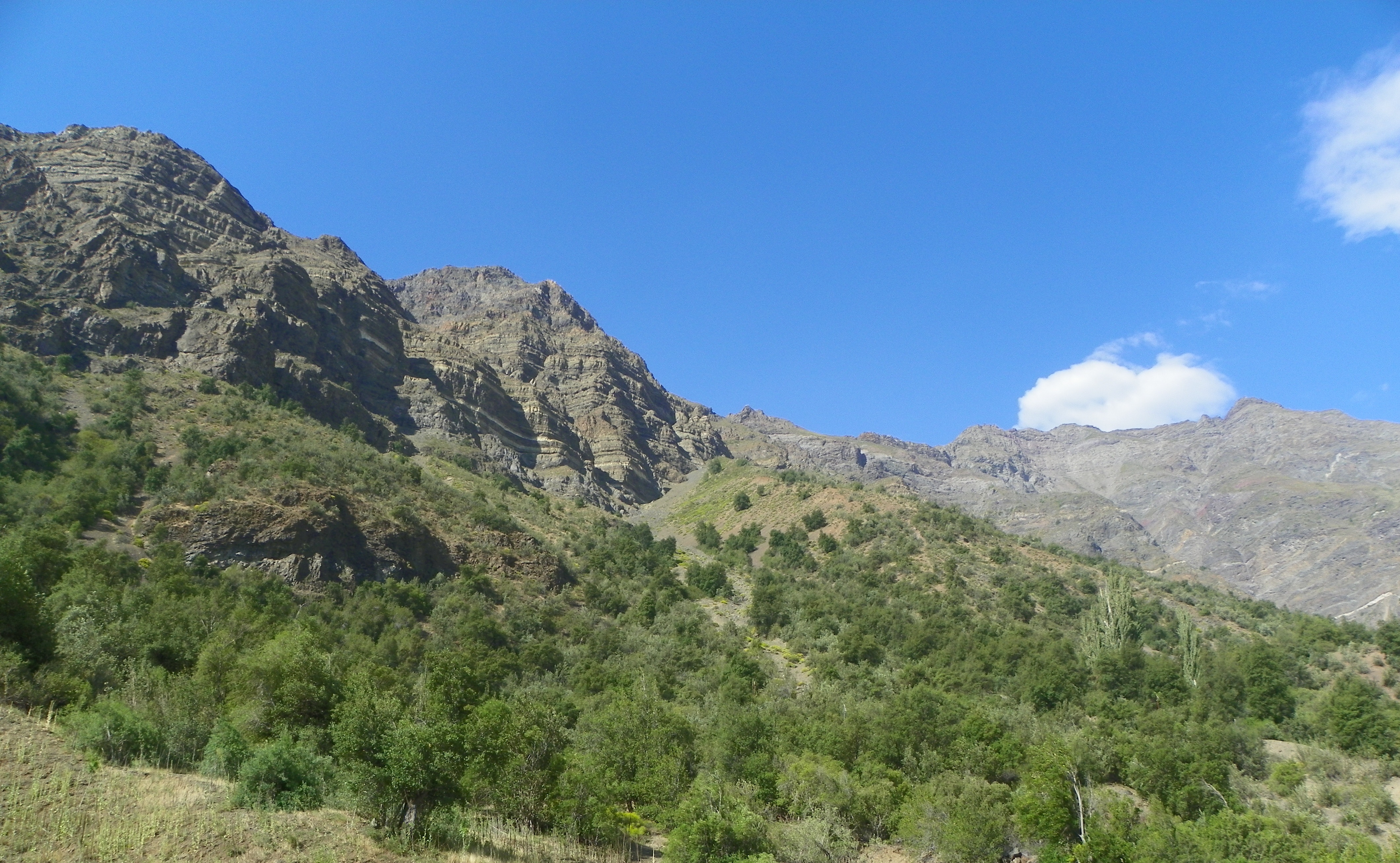
- Matorral scene in San José de Maipo

- Location in Chile

Ecology
- Realm: Neotropical
- Biome: Mediterranean forests, woodlands, and scrub
- Borders: Atacama Desert; Central Andean dry puna; Southern Andean steppe, Valdivian temperate forests

Geography
- Area: 148,500 km^{2} (57,300 mi^{2})
- Country: Chile
- Climate type: BSk: arid, steppe, cold arid

Conservation
- Protected: 2,947 km^{2} (2%)

The Chilean Matorral (NT1201) is a terrestrial ecoregion of central Chile, located on the west coast of South America. It is in the Mediterranean forests, woodlands, and scrub biome, and is thus part of the Neotropical realm.

The matorral ecoregion is characterized by a temperate Mediterranean climate, with rainy winters and dry summers, and lies between the arid Atacama Desert and the humid Valdivian temperate forests. The ecoregion is home to diverse plant communities, including matorral or tall shrubland, forests and woodlands, savannas, and low shrubland and scrub.

The ecoregion is one of the world's five Mediterranean climate regions, which are all located in the middle latitudes on the west coast of continents. The Mediterranean Basin, the California chaparral and woodlands ecoregion of California and Baja California, the Cape Province of South Africa, and Southwest Australia are the other Mediterranean-climate regions.

== Setting ==
The Matorral occupies central Chile between 32° and 37° south latitude. The Pacific Ocean lies to the west, and the Chilean Coastal Range lies parallel to the coast. The Chilean Central Valley lies between the Coastal range and the Andes Mountains, which bound the matorral ecoregion on the east. To the north is the extremely dry Atacama desert, which separates the matorral from the tropical forests of northern South America. A semi-desert region known as El Norte Chico (the "little north") lies between 28° and 32° south latitude, and is the transition zone between the Atacama desert and the Matorral. To the south lies the cooler and wetter Valdivian temperate forests ecoregion, which includes transitional deciduous forests, including the Maulino forest of the Chilean Coast Range, along with most of South America's temperate rain forests.

== Flora ==
The Chilean Matorral ecoregion is home to several plant communities. Semi-desert scrub is common in the north, in the transition to the arid Atacama. Matorral, woodland, forest, and savanna occur further south

- Coastal semi-desert scrub, also known as lomas, forms a narrow belt along the Pacific coast from 32 to 24º S, from sea level up to approximately 1,200 m elevation on the Chilean Coast Range. Fog and low clouds from the sea provide more moisture, reduce evapotranspiration and keep summer temperatures cooler, in contrast to the semi-desert scrub and arid Atacama Desert further inland. Typical vegetation consists of shrubs up to 2 meters high, with columnar cactus reaching 3–4 meters tall. Vegetation cover is highest, up to 80%, from 700 to 800 meters elevation where the fog is most abundant, and 30-40% elsewhere. Characteristic species include Euphorbia lactiflua, Echinopsis deserticola, Eulychnia iquiquensis, Eulychnia breviflora, Heliotropium taltalense, Nolana crassulifolia, Nolana leptophylla, Ophryosporus triangularis, Oxalis virgosa, Proustia cuneifolia subsp. tipia, Puya boliviensis, and many others.
- Coastal matorral is a low, soft coastal scrubland which extends from La Serena in the north to Valparaíso in the south. In less arid areas it is a shrubland with shrubs 1.5 to 2 meters tall, interspersed with succulent rosette plants and columnar cacti. Typical species are the palhuén (Adesmia microphylla), palo de yagua or wild coastal fuchsia (Fuchsia lycioides), Schinus latifolia, Azara celastrina, Lithraea caustica, Pouteria valparadisaea, Ageratina glechonophylla, Anisomeria littoralis, and Puya chilensis. The coastal matorral is similar to the garrigue of the Mediterranean Basin and the coastal sage scrub of southern California. In the more arid north, semi-open shrubland less than 1 meter tall it typical, with low soft shrubs and succulent Bromeliaceae and Cactaceae. Typical northern species include coastal daisy (Bahia ambrosioides), Puya chilensis, Baccharis macraei, Haplopappus foliosus, Solanum pinnatum, and Eulychnia acida. Herbaceous annual plants cover open areas during the springtime, and dry up during the summer months.
- Matorral is a shrubland plant community, composed of sclerophyll ("hard-leaved") shrubs and small trees, cactus, and bromeliads. Typical species include litre (Lithraea caustica), quillay or soapbark tree (Quillaja saponaria), cactus (Echinopsis chiloensis), and bromeliads of genus Puya, with a diverse understory of herbs, vines, and geophytes. The matorral is similar to the chaparral of California and the maquis of the Mediterranean Basin.
- Espinal is a savanna plant community, composed of widely spaced clumps of trees, predominantly Espino (Vachellia caven) and spiny carob tree (Prosopis chilensis), with an understory of annual grasses introduced from the Mediterranean Basin in the 16th century. Much of the espinal was formerly matorral, degraded over the centuries by intensive grazing of sheep, goats, and cattle.
- Sclerophyll woodlands and forests were once more extensive, but now exist in small patches in the coast ranges and Andean foothills. The sclerophyll forests and woodlands are composed predominantly of evergreen sclerophyll trees, including peumo (Cryptocarya alba), boldo (Peumus boldus), mayten (Maytenus boaria), and Chilean wine palm (Jubaea chilensis).

The ecoregion has many endemic plant species, with affinities to the South American tropics, the Antarctic flora, and the Andes. About 95% of the plant species are endemic to Chile, including Gomortega keule, Pitavia punctata, Nothofagus alessandrii, and the Chilean wine palm, Jubaea chilensis.

== Fauna ==
Simonetti estimated that Mediterranean Chile had 200 native bird species, 37 mammals, 38 reptiles, and 12 amphibians, with 7 endemic birds, 7 endemic mammals, 31 endemic reptiles, and 6 endemic amphibians.

Endemic and near-endemic birds include the Chilean tinamou (Nothoprocta perdicaria), moustached turca (Pteroptochos megapodius), white-throated tapaculo (Scelorchilus albicollis), Ochre-flanked tapaculo (Eugralla paradoxa), crag earthcreeper (Ochetorhynchus melanurus), dusky-tailed canastero (Pseudasthenes humicola), and Chilean mockingbird (Mimus thenca). The ecoregion corresponds to the Central Chile Endemic Bird Area.

Native mammals include the common degu (Octodon degus), Bridges's degu (Octodon bridgesii), pichi or dwarf armadillo (Zaedyus pichiy), and southern river otter (Lontra provocax). The guanaco (Lama guanacoe) has been extirpated from the ecoregion. Native mammal predators include the puma (Puma concolor), Andean mountain cat (Leopardus jacobita), culpeo or andean wolf (Pseudalopex culpaeus), and South American gray fox (Pseudalopex griseus).

Endemic reptiles include several species of tree iguana, including the black-spotted tree iguana (Liolaemus nigromaculatus), braided tree iguana (Liolaemus platei), brown tree iguana (Liolaemus fuscus), Hellmich's tree iguana (Liolaemus hellmichi), Liolaemus nigromaculatus, Kuhlman's tree iguana (Liolaemus zapallarensis), Schroeder's tree iguana (Liolaemus schroederi), shining tree iguana (Liolaemus nitidus), Chilean tree iguana (Liolaemus chiliensis), Liolaemus atacamensis, Liolaemus pseudolemniscatus, Liolaemus reichei, and Liolaemus silvai. Other endemic reptiles include Alvaro's anole (Pristidactylus alvaroi), the spotted false monitor (Callopistes maculatus), Yanez's lava lizard (Microlophus yanezi), Pristidactylus valeriae, and Chilean marked gecko (Garthia gaudichaudii).

Native amphibians include the Atacama toad (Rhinella atacamensis) in the northern portion of the ecoregion, and the banded wood frog (Batrachyla taeniata), Chile four-eyed frog (Pleurodema thaul), helmeted water toad (Caudiverbera caudiverbera), and Alsodes nodosus.

== Conservation and threats ==
The matorral ecoregion contains the majority of Chile's population and its largest cities. The Central valley is Chile's main agricultural region, and the region is also subject to extensive grazing, logging, and urbanization. Grasses and other herbaceous plants introduced from the Mediterranean Basin have covered extensive areas of the ecoregion, displacing native plants. Much of the ecoregion's original forest and woodland has been degraded into matorral or scrub, and much matorral degraded into espinal or sparse scrub. Other threats include human-caused fires and overgrazing by introduced rabbits, hares, and goats.

Of Chile's ecoregions, the matorral is the least protected by national parks and preserves. Only 1.3% of the ecoregion is protected. Protected areas include:

- Lago Peñuelas National Reserve
- Río Blanco National Reserve
- Las Cruces Marine and Coastal Protected Area
- Bosque de Fray Jorge National Park
- Las Palmas de Cocalán National Park
- Llanos de Challe National Park
- Pan de Azúcar National Park
- Morro Moreno National Park
- Las Chinchillas National Reserve
- Pingüino de Humboldt National Reserve
- El Yali National Reserve
- Roblería del Cobre de Loncha National Reserve
- Pichasca Natural Monument
- Cerro Ñielol Natural Monument
- Isla Cachagua Natural Monument
- Paposo Norte Natural Monument
- Roca Oceánica Nature Sanctuary
- Campo dunar de la punta de Concón Nature Sanctuary
- Palmar El Salto Nature Sanctuary
- Las Petras de Quintero y su Entorno Nature Sanctuary
- Laguna El Peral Nature Sanctuary
- Laguna Conchalí Nature Sanctuary
- Granito Orbicular Nature Sanctuary
- Serranía el Ciprés Nature Sanctuary
- Acantilados Federico Santa María Nature Sanctuary
- Isla de Cachagua Nature Sanctuary
- Predio Sector "Altos de Cantillana - Horcón de Piedra y Roblería Cajón de Lisboa" Nature Sanctuary
- San Juan de Piche Nature Sanctuary
- Bosque de Calabacillo de Navidad Nature Sanctuary
- Horcón de Piedra (Fundo Rinconada de Chocalán) Nature Sanctuary
- Cajón del Río Achibueno Nature Sanctuary
- Estero Derecho Nature Sanctuary
- Humedal de Tunquén Nature Sanctuary
- Quebrada de La Plata Nature Sanctuary
- Quebrada de Córdova Nature Sanctuary
- Quebrada Llau Llau Nature Sanctuary
- Área de Palma Chilena de Monte Aranda Nature Sanctuary
- Cerro Poqui Nature Sanctuary
- Raja de Manquehua - Poza Azul Nature Sanctuary
- Humedales de Tongoy Nature Sanctuary
- Humedal Río Maipo Nature Sanctuary
- Cerro Santa Inés Nature Sanctuary
- El Zaino - Laguna El Copín Nature Sanctuary
- Humedal Costero Carrizal Bajo Nature Sanctuary
