= A. petiolaris =

A. petiolaris may refer to:

- Acacia petiolaris, a synonym for Acacia pycnantha, a tree species
- Azara petiolaris, the holly azara, a plant species

== See also ==
- Petiolaris (disambiguation)
