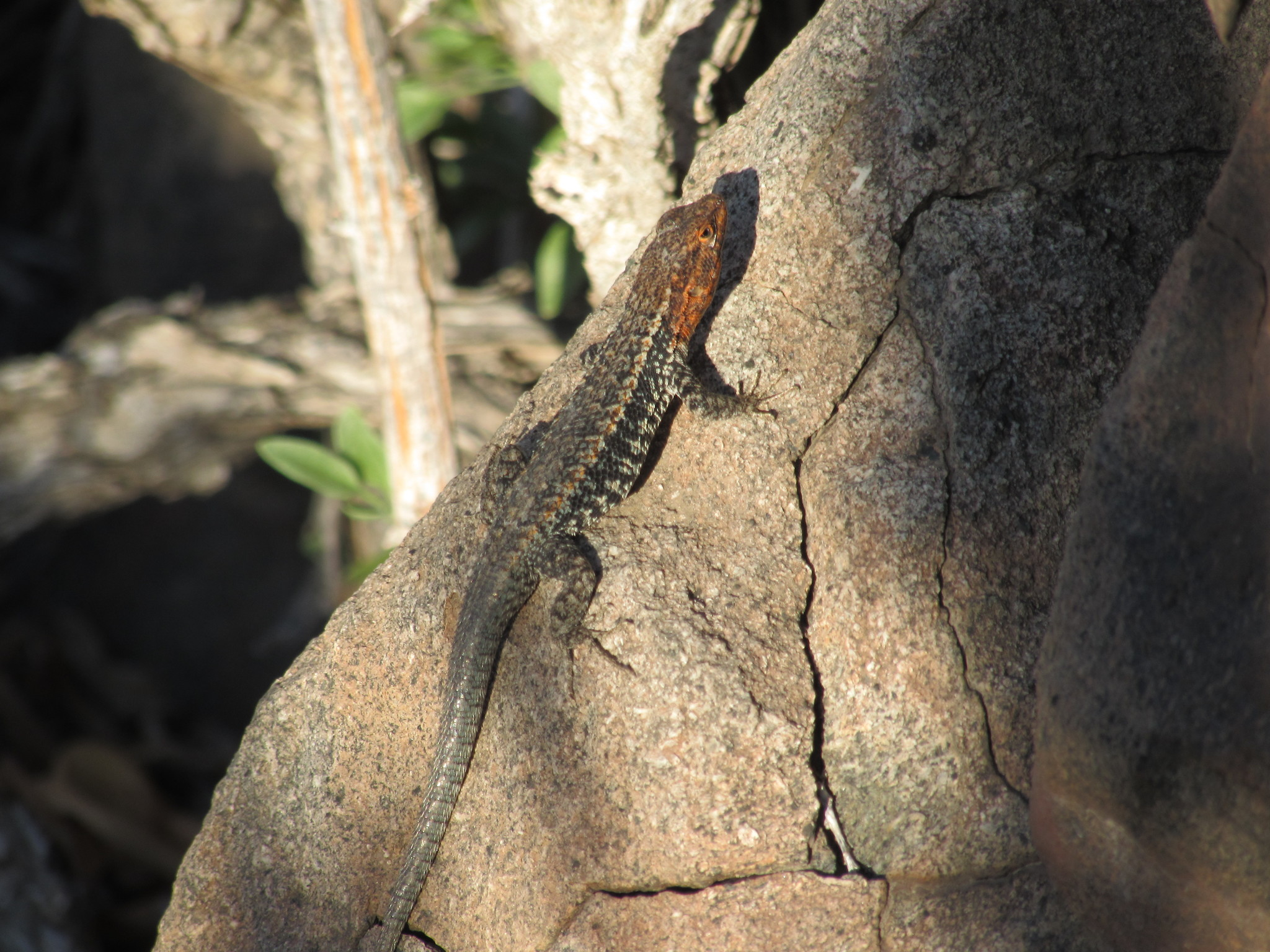

Conservation status
- Least Concern (IUCN 3.1)

Scientific classification
- Kingdom: Animalia
- Phylum: Chordata
- Class: Reptilia
- Order: Squamata
- Suborder: Iguania
- Family: Liolaemidae
- Genus: Liolaemus
- Species: L. platei

Binomial name
- Liolaemus platei F. Werner, 1898

= Liolaemus platei =

Species of reptile

Liolaemus platei, known by the common name braided tree iguana, is a species of lizard in the family Liolaemidae. The species is endemic to Chile.

== Geographic range and habitat ==
This taxon, L. platei, is endemic to the Chilean Matorral ecoregion, ranging from Antofagasta Region in the north through the Atacama Region to the Coquimbo Region in the south.

== Taxonomy ==
L. platei was described as a species new to science in the year 1898 by Austrian herpetologist Franz Werner. Liolaemus curicensis was formerly considered a subspecies of L. platei.

== Etymology ==
The specific name, platei, is in honor of German zoologist Ludwig Hermann Plate.

== Conservation status ==
L. platei is classified by the IUCN as Least Concern.

== Reproduction ==
L. platei is oviparous.
