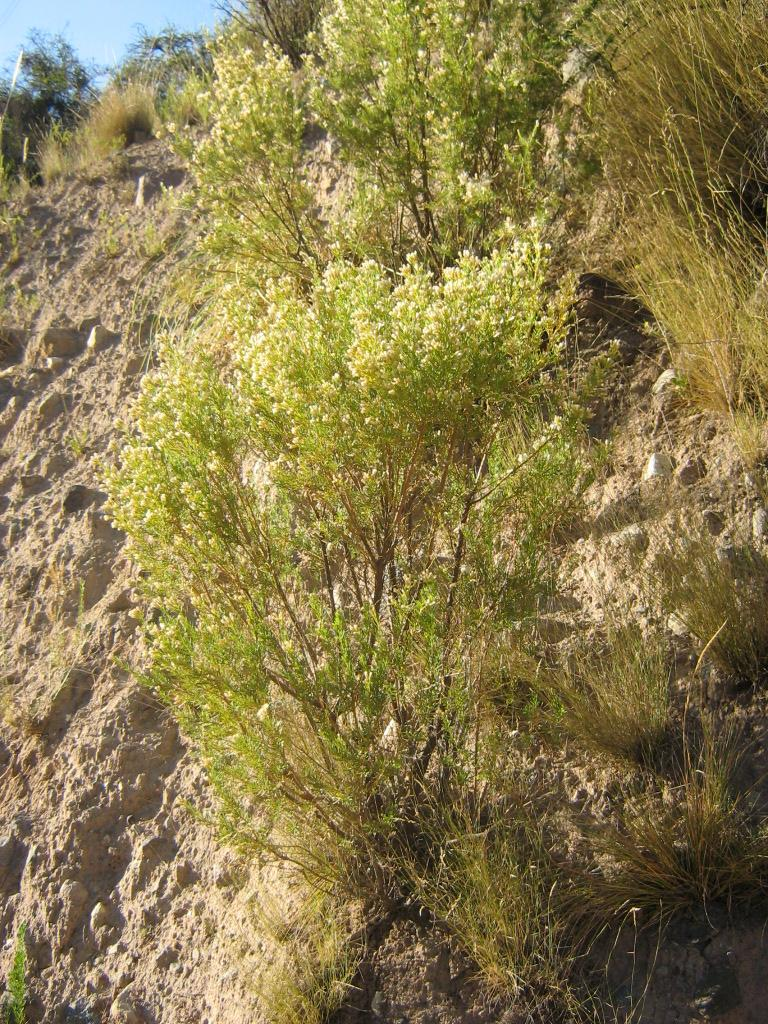

Scientific classification
- Kingdom: Plantae
- Clade: Tracheophytes
- Clade: Angiosperms
- Clade: Eudicots
- Clade: Asterids
- Order: Asterales
- Family: Asteraceae
- Genus: Baccharis
- Species: B. linearis

Binomial name
- Baccharis linearis (Ruiz & Pav.) Pers.
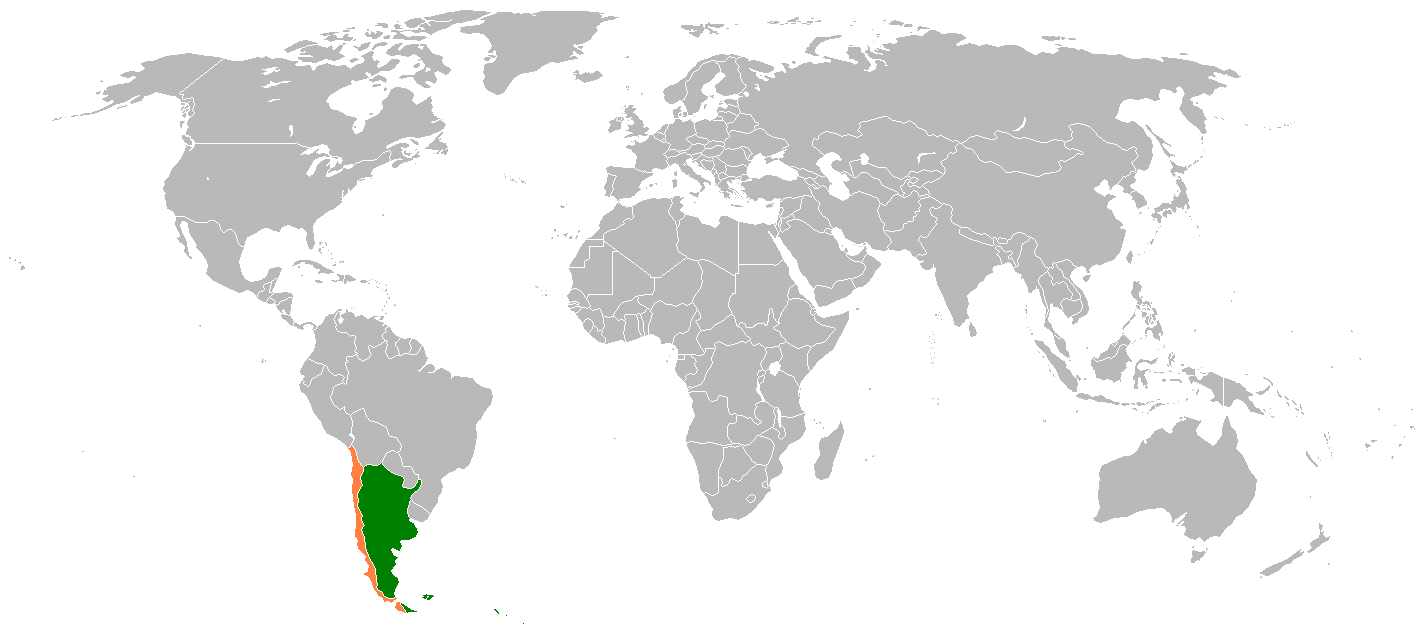
- distribution of Baccharis linearis

Synonyms
- Molina linearis Ruiz & Pav.; Baccharis callistemoides Meyen & Walp.; Baccharis holmbergii Hicken; Baccharis lingulata Kunze ex Less.; Baccharis rosmarinifolia Hook. & Arn.; Baccharis subandina Phil.; Baccharis montteana Phil.; Baccharis rosmarinifolia var. callistemoides Heering; Baccharis rosmarinifolia var. subandina Heering; Baccharis rosmarinifolia var. subsinuata DC.; Baccharis serrulata var. linearis (Ruiz & Pav.) Kuntze

= Baccharis linearis =

Species of flowering plant

Baccharis linearis, the romerillo or Chilean little rosemary, is a common shrub in Central Chile. It is frequently found in old field after agriculture. Cecidia or galls caused by the fruit fly Rachiptera limbata grow as white, spongy and globose tissues on the twigs of the plant.

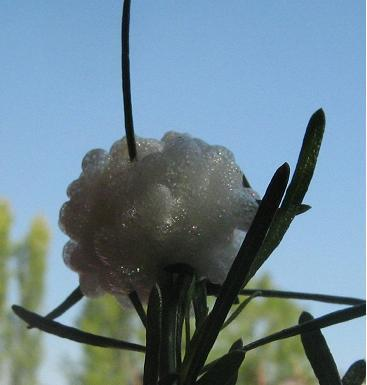
Gall on twigs of Baccharis linearis

== Description ==
This densely branched, shrubby species reaches heights of 1–3 m. The branches are erect. Young branches have a green bark, which becomes reddish brown with age. The linear, sessile, rarely dentate leaves are 0–30 mm long and 0-2.5 mm wide. Dentate leaves are observed on young plants, but this characteristic is lost in later ontogenic stages, in which only linear leaves devoid of any dentation are formed. The capitula are formed in groups. In male plants they are 3-4.5 mm wide and in female plants they are 2–3 mm wide. They are attached to the branches by 3–8 mm long peduncles.

== Natural hybridisation ==
This species is part of a homoploid hybrid swarm involving Baccharis macraei. Together both parent species form the natural hybrid Baccharis intermedia.
