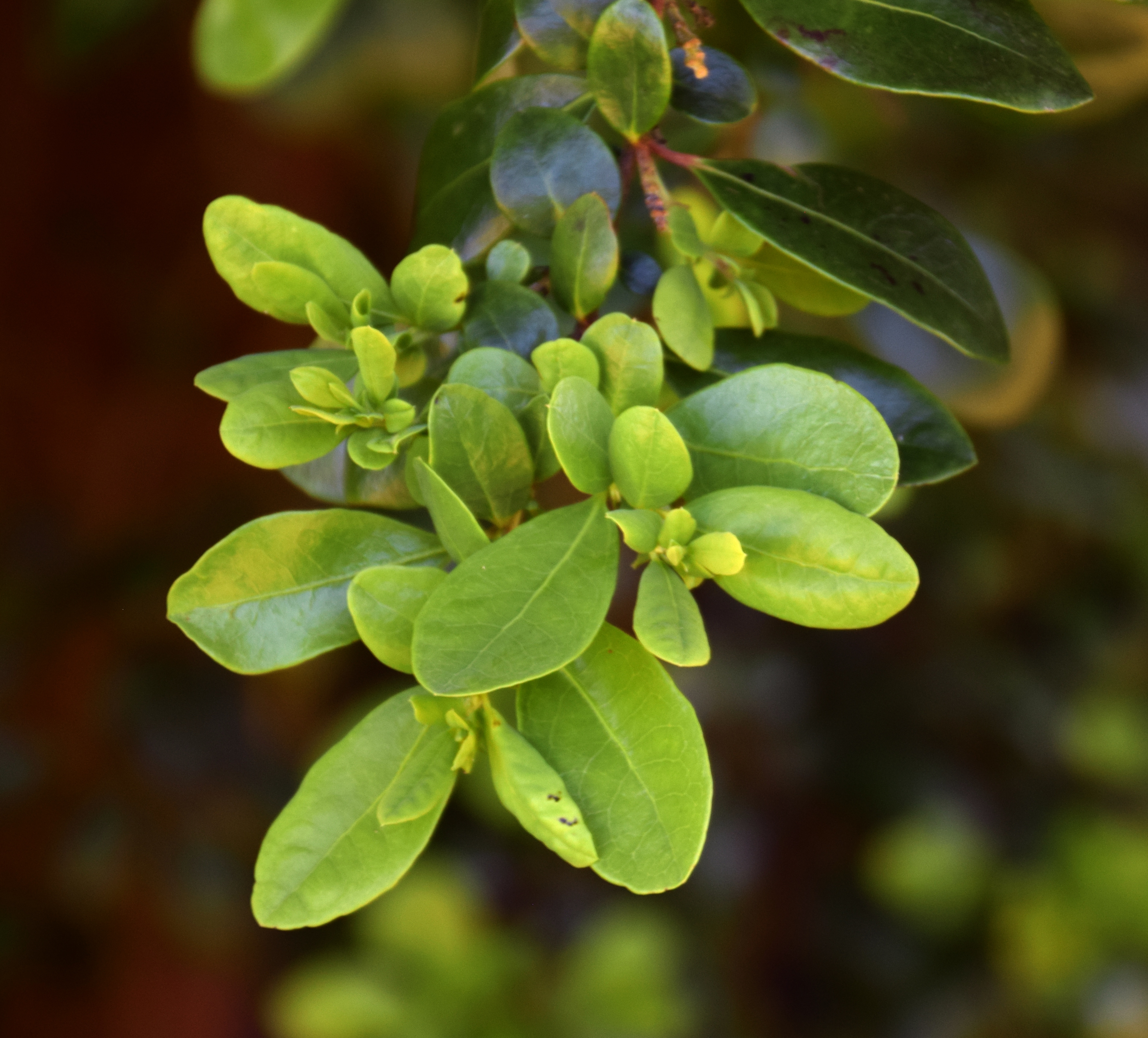

Scientific classification
- Kingdom: Plantae
- Clade: Tracheophytes
- Clade: Angiosperms
- Clade: Eudicots
- Clade: Rosids
- Order: Malpighiales
- Family: Salicaceae
- Genus: Azara
- Species: A. integrifolia

Binomial name
- Azara integrifolia Ruiz & Pav

= Azara integrifolia =

Species of flowering plant

Azara integrifolia is a species of flowering plant in the family Salicaceae. It is endemic to Chile, where it is distributed from the Valparaiso to the Los Rios regions.
