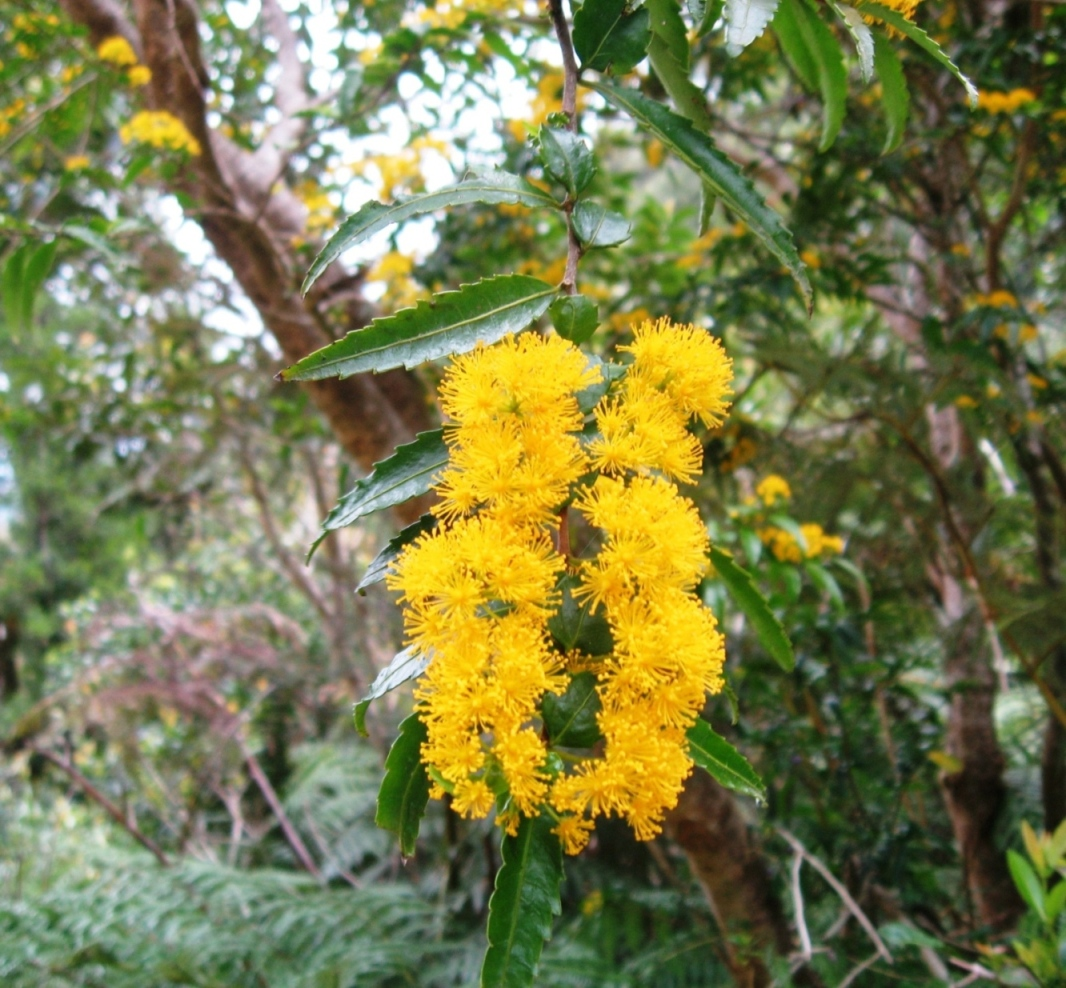

Scientific classification
- Kingdom: Plantae
- Clade: Tracheophytes
- Clade: Angiosperms
- Clade: Eudicots
- Clade: Rosids
- Order: Malpighiales
- Family: Salicaceae
- Genus: Azara
- Species: A. lanceolata

Binomial name
- Azara lanceolata Hook. f. 1845

Synonyms
- Azara serrata f. reiche Hook. Azara chiloensis Hook.f. Azara brumalis Gand.

= Azara lanceolata =

Species of flowering plant

Azara lanceolata, the lanceleaf azara, locally known as corcolen or aromo, is a species of flowering plant in the family Salicaceae (it was previously categorized as Flacourtiaceae). It has been named after its lance-shaped, serrated, glossy, bright green leaves. It is an evergreen shrub, growing to a height of 3–5 meters. It is found on both sides of the Andes Mountains, in the south of Argentina and Chile.

Its flowers, which bloom in either late winter or early spring are known for having a strong scent, which some people regard to be reminiscent of vanilla.

== Gallery ==
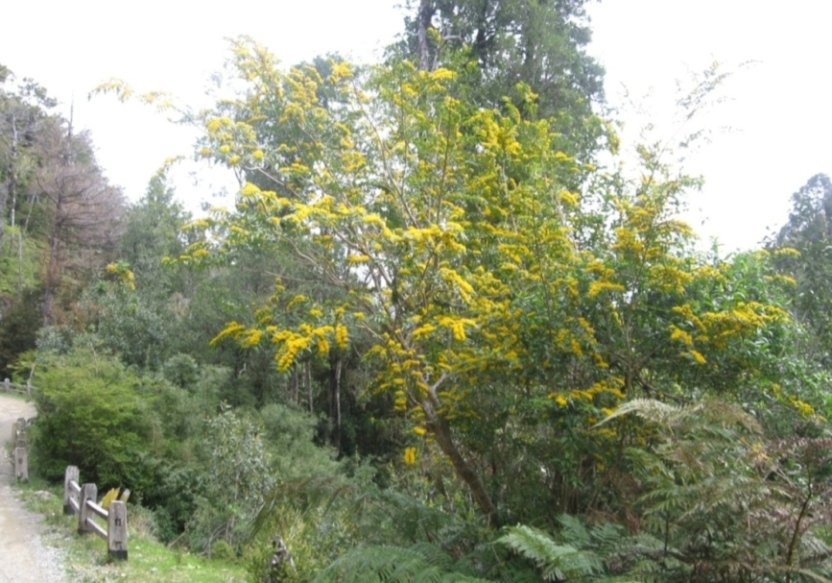

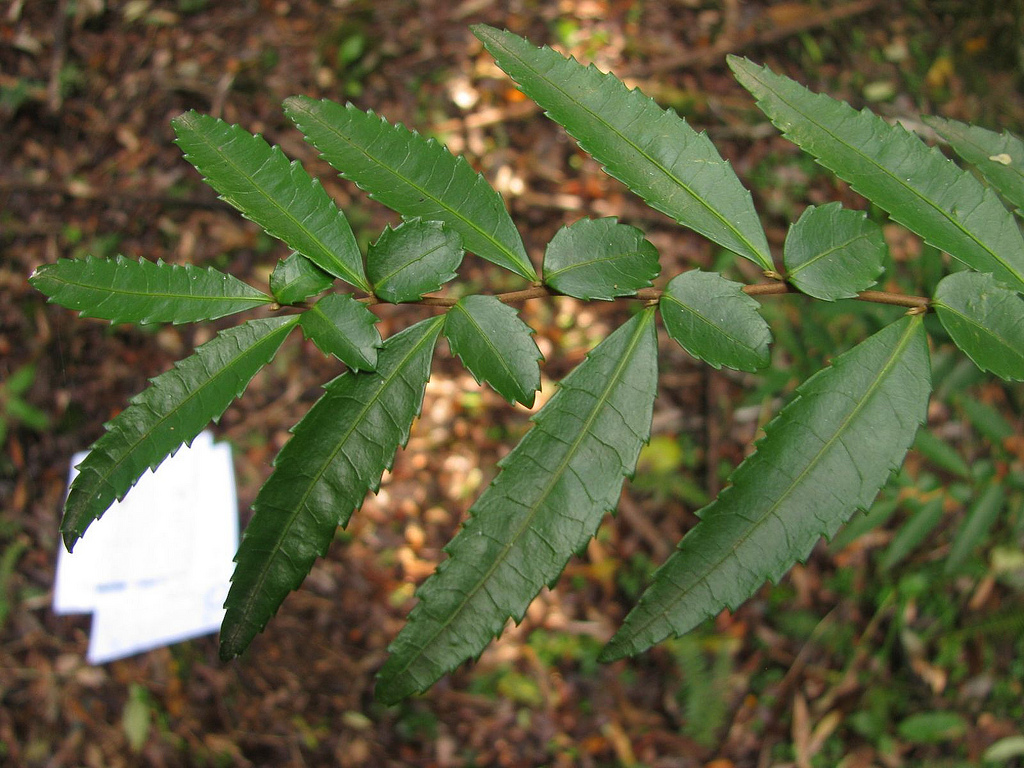

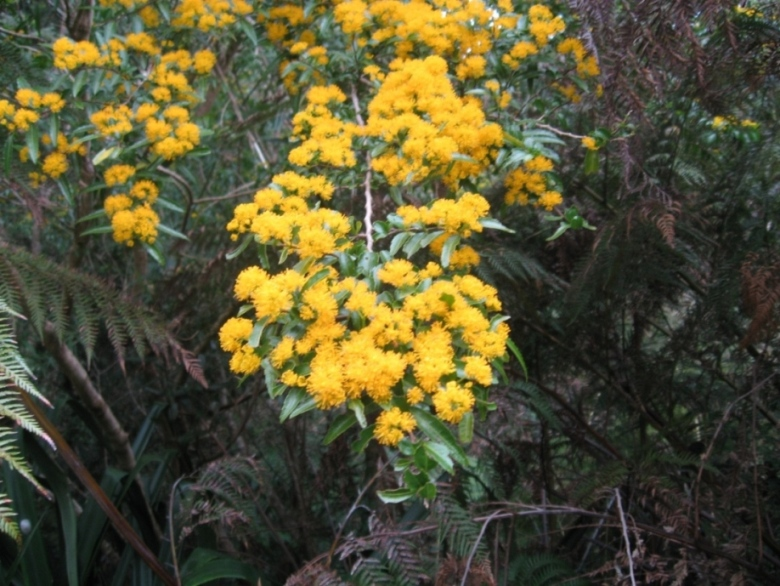
