= Baccharis intermedia =

Scientific classification
- Kingdom: Plantae
- Clade: Tracheophytes
- Clade: Angiosperms
- Clade: Eudicots
- Clade: Asterids
- Order: Asterales
- Family: Asteraceae
- Genus: Baccharis
- Species: B. intermedia

Binomial name
- Baccharis intermedia DC.
- Baccharis intermedia is endemic to Chile

Synonyms
- Baccharis gayana Phil.

Species of flowering plant

Baccharis intermedia is a species of shrub in the family Asteraceae endemic to Chile.

== Description ==
Baccharis intermedia is a shrub.

== Taxonomy ==
It was published by Augustin Pyramus de Candolle in 1836. It has one synonym: Baccharis gayana Phil.

=== Natural hybridisation ===
It is observed in areas, in which the habitats of Baccharis linearis and Baccharis macraei overlap or come into close contact. It is a natural hybrid of the aforementioned species and is part of a homoploid hybrid swarm. As a result, its morphology is intermediate.

== Distribution ==
This species is common on coastal hills of central Chile.
