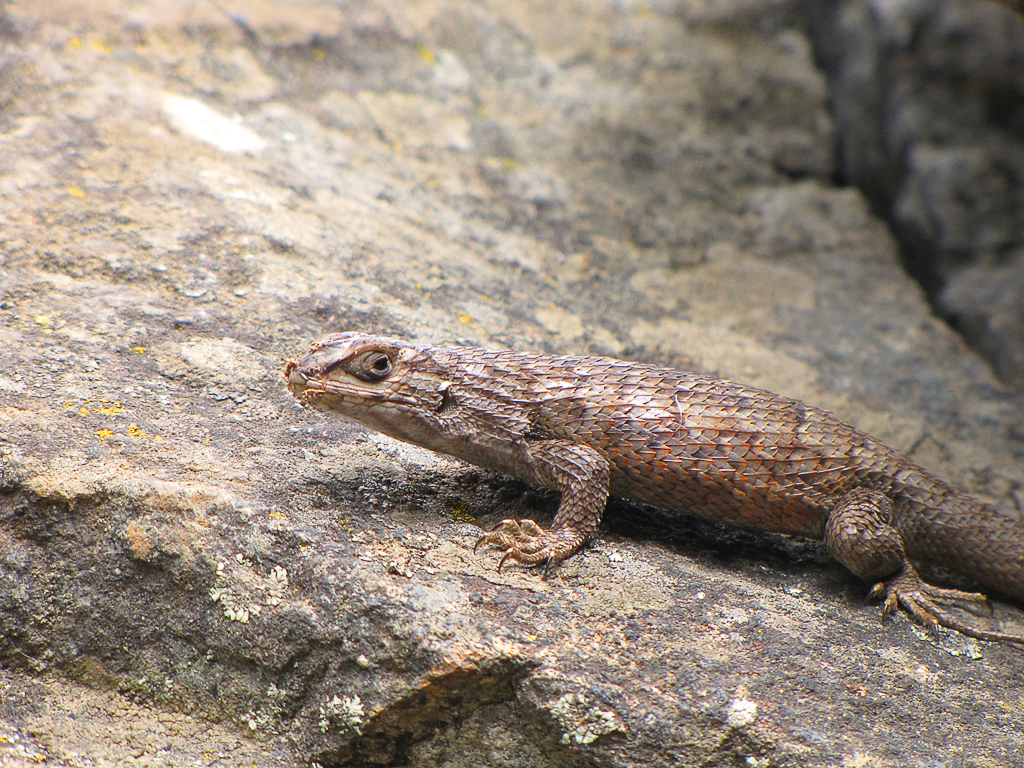

Conservation status
- Least Concern (IUCN 3.1)

Scientific classification
- Kingdom: Animalia
- Phylum: Chordata
- Class: Reptilia
- Order: Squamata
- Suborder: Iguania
- Family: Liolaemidae
- Genus: Liolaemus
- Species: L. nitidus

Binomial name
- Liolaemus nitidus (Wiegmann, 1834)

= Liolaemus nitidus =

Species of lizard

Liolaemus nitidus (shining tree iguana) is a species of lizard in the family Liolaemidae. It is endemic to Chile, notably within the Chilean matorral ecoregion.

A medium-sized species, reaching 9 cm snout-to-vent, up to 27 cm including the long tail. It is oviparous, and juvenile specimens usually feed on insects, though adults tend to have a more omnivorous diet.
