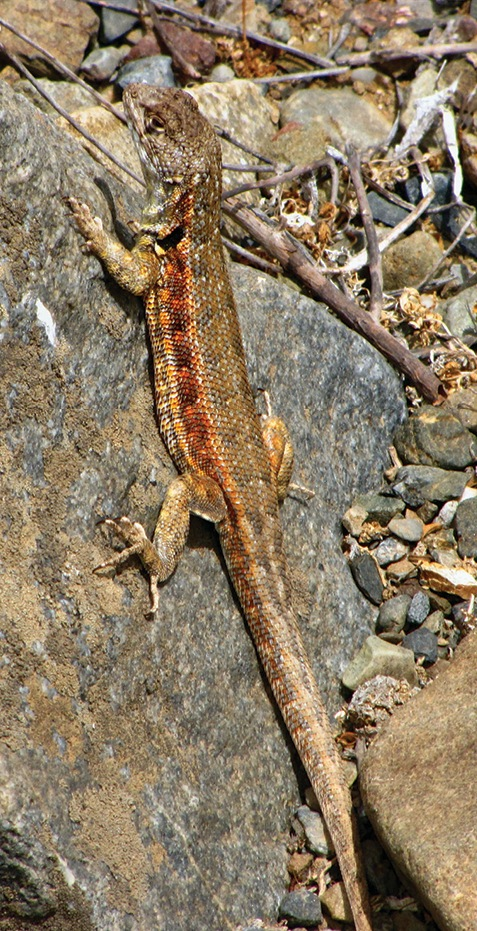

Conservation status
- Least Concern (IUCN 3.1)

Scientific classification
- Kingdom: Animalia
- Phylum: Chordata
- Class: Reptilia
- Order: Squamata
- Suborder: Iguania
- Family: Liolaemidae
- Genus: Liolaemus
- Species: L. atacamensis

Binomial name
- Liolaemus atacamensis Müller, & Hellmich, 1933

= Liolaemus atacamensis =

Species of lizard

Liolaemus atacamensis, the Atacama tree iguana, is a species of lizard in the family Liolaemidae. It is endemic to Chile, with occurrence noted in the Chilean matorral.
