= Ludwig Hermann Plate =

German zoologist (1862–1937)

Ludwig Plate
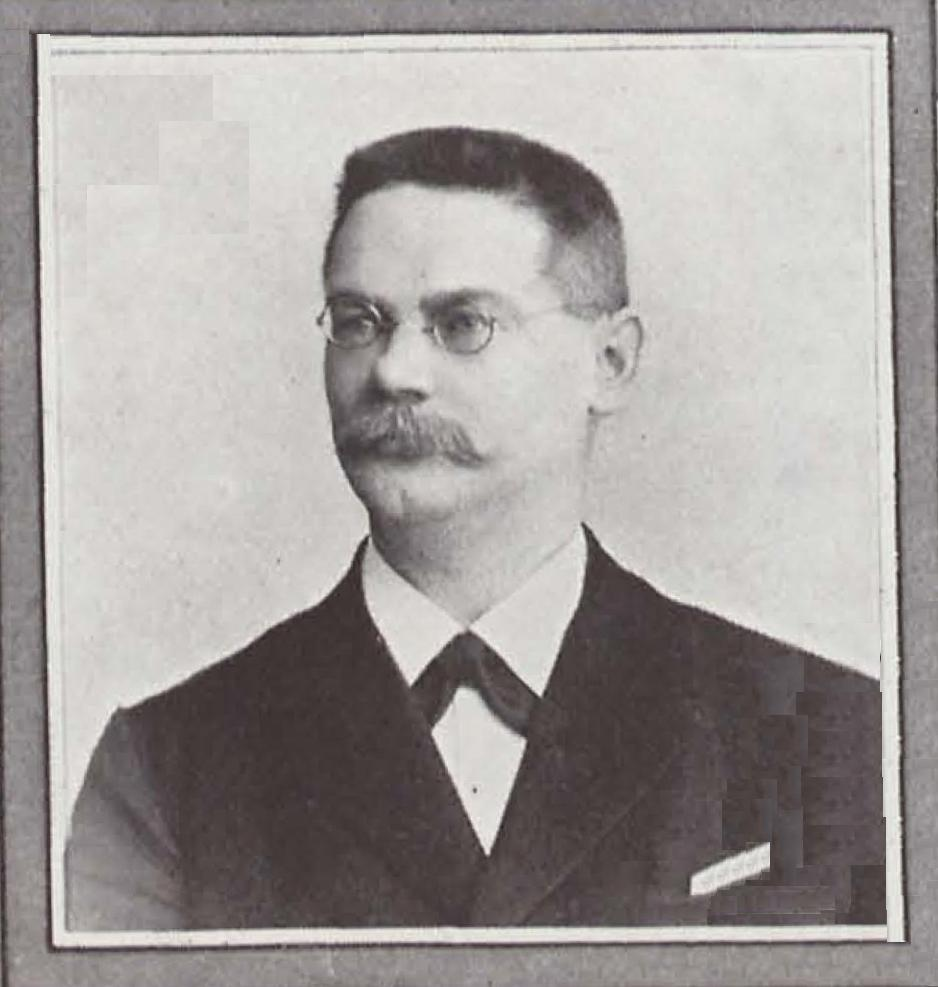
- Born: August 16, 1862
- Died: November 16, 1937
- Occupation: Zoologist

Ludwig Hermann Plate (16 August 1862 – 16 November 1937) was a German zoologist and student of Ernst Haeckel. He wrote a "thorough and extensive defence" of Darwinism, but before Mendel's work had been assimilated in the modern synthesis.

Born in Bremen, Plate studied mathematics and natural sciences Bonn and in Jena, where he attended the lectures of Ernst Haeckel. In 1888, he achieved the 'Habilitation' in zoology at the University of Marburg. He was offered the Chair of Zoology at Jena University in 1909 through the help of Haeckel, and also became director of the Jena "Phyletisches Museum".

He coined the term Pleiotropy.

== Evolutionary views ==
Plate was a proponent of what he called old-Darwinism or orthoevolution, which included a supposedly directed form of natural selection, orthoselection. According to Plate, old-Darwinism follows the ideas of Charles Darwin but also integrates other mechanisms of evolution. He attempted to combine Lamarckism, natural selection and orthogenesis into a unified framework. Many of the factors of the modern synthesis of the early 20th century were first mentioned by Plate. He held that random mutation and natural selection have a major role in evolution. He also acknowledged population thinking.

He differed from the modern synthesis in accepting non-Darwinian mechanisms of evolution such as the Lamarckian inheritance of acquired characteristics and orthogenesis. Plate coined the term orthoselection. This term was later used by modern synthesis theorists such as Julian Huxley and Bernard Rensch. In his later writings he incorporated research from genetics into his evolutionary writings.

== Legacy ==
A species of Chilean lizard, Liolaemus platei, is named in his honor.

== Publications ==
- Die Anatomie und Phylogenie der Chitonen (1901).
- Über die Bedeutung des Darwin'schen Selektionsprincips und Probleme der Artbildung (1903).
- Selektionprinzip und Problem der Artbildung: ein Handbuch der Darwinismus (1913).
- Die Abstammungslehre: Tatsachen, Theorien, Einwände und Folgerungen in kurzer Darstellung (1925).
