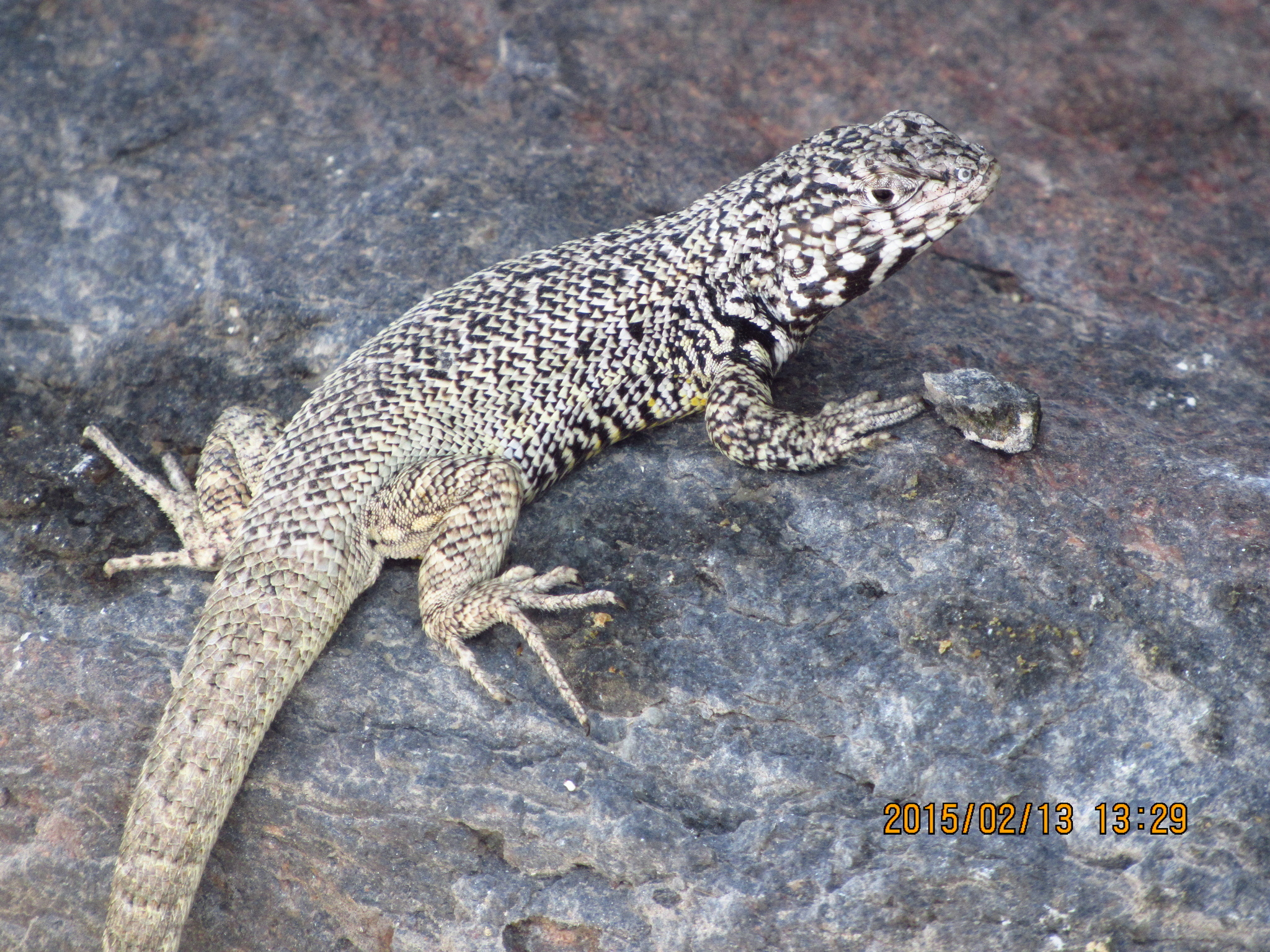

Conservation status
- Near Threatened (IUCN 3.1)

Scientific classification
- Kingdom: Animalia
- Phylum: Chordata
- Class: Reptilia
- Order: Squamata
- Suborder: Iguania
- Family: Liolaemidae
- Genus: Liolaemus
- Species: L. silvai

Binomial name
- Liolaemus silvai Ortiz, 1989

= Liolaemus silvai =

Species of reptille

Liolaemus silvai is a species of lizard in the family Liolaemidae. The species is endemic to Chile, with occurrence noted in the Chilean matorral.

== Etymology ==
The specific name, silvai, is in honor of Chilean zoologist Francisco Silva G., who is a professor at the Universidad de Concepción.

== Habitat ==
The preferred natural habitat of L. silvai is shrubland, at altitudes of 140–150 m (460–490 ft).

== Appearance ==
L. silvai have been observed with two main colorings, orange and yellow. Specifically, individuals of the species typically have orange or yellow ventral coloration and black dorsal coloration with no correlation to sex.

== Reproduction ==
L. silvai is oviparous.
