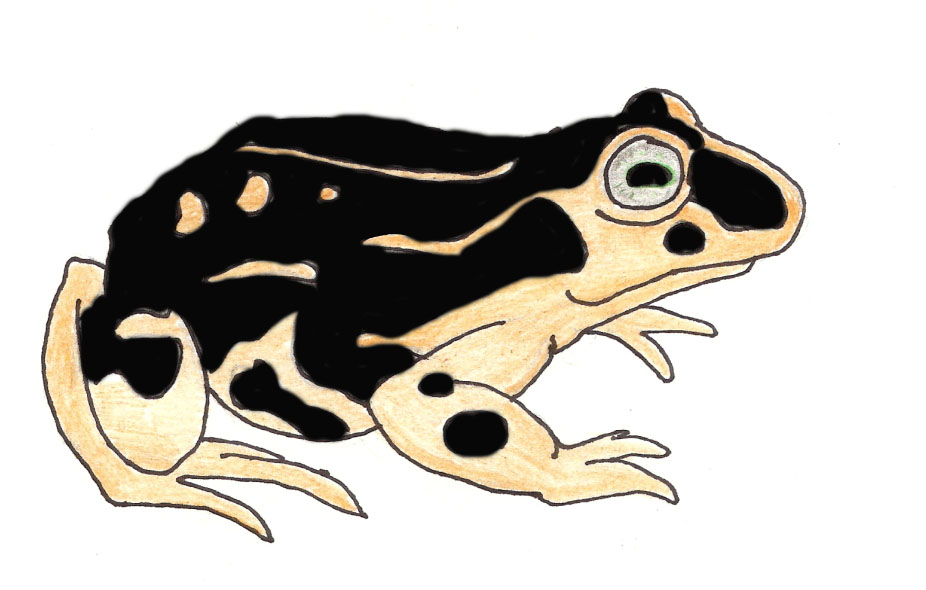

Conservation status
- Vulnerable (IUCN 3.1)

Scientific classification
- Kingdom: Animalia
- Phylum: Chordata
- Class: Amphibia
- Order: Anura
- Family: Bufonidae
- Genus: Rhinella
- Species: R. atacamensis

Binomial name
- Rhinella atacamensis (Cei, 1962)

Synonyms
- Bufo spinulosus atacamensis Cei, 1962 "1961"; Bufo atacamensis Cei, 1962; Chaunus atacamensis (Cei, 1962)

= Rhinella atacamensis =

Species of toad

Rhinella atacamensis, sometimes called the Vallenar toad or Atacama toad, is a species of toad in the family Bufonidae. It is endemic to Chile and occurs between Paposo (Antofagasta Region) and Las Chilcas (Valparaíso Region). It inhabits the desert Pacific coastal region with Mediterranean influences (including the Chilean matorral) and is found in and near oases and streams. Breeding takes place in permanent pools (including water tanks for livestock), streams, and rivers. While abundant at a few sites, it has declined overall and gone locally extinct at some sites. Threats to this species include extensive droughts and water pollution as well as extraction of surface water, mining, agriculture, livestock farming, and timber plantations.
