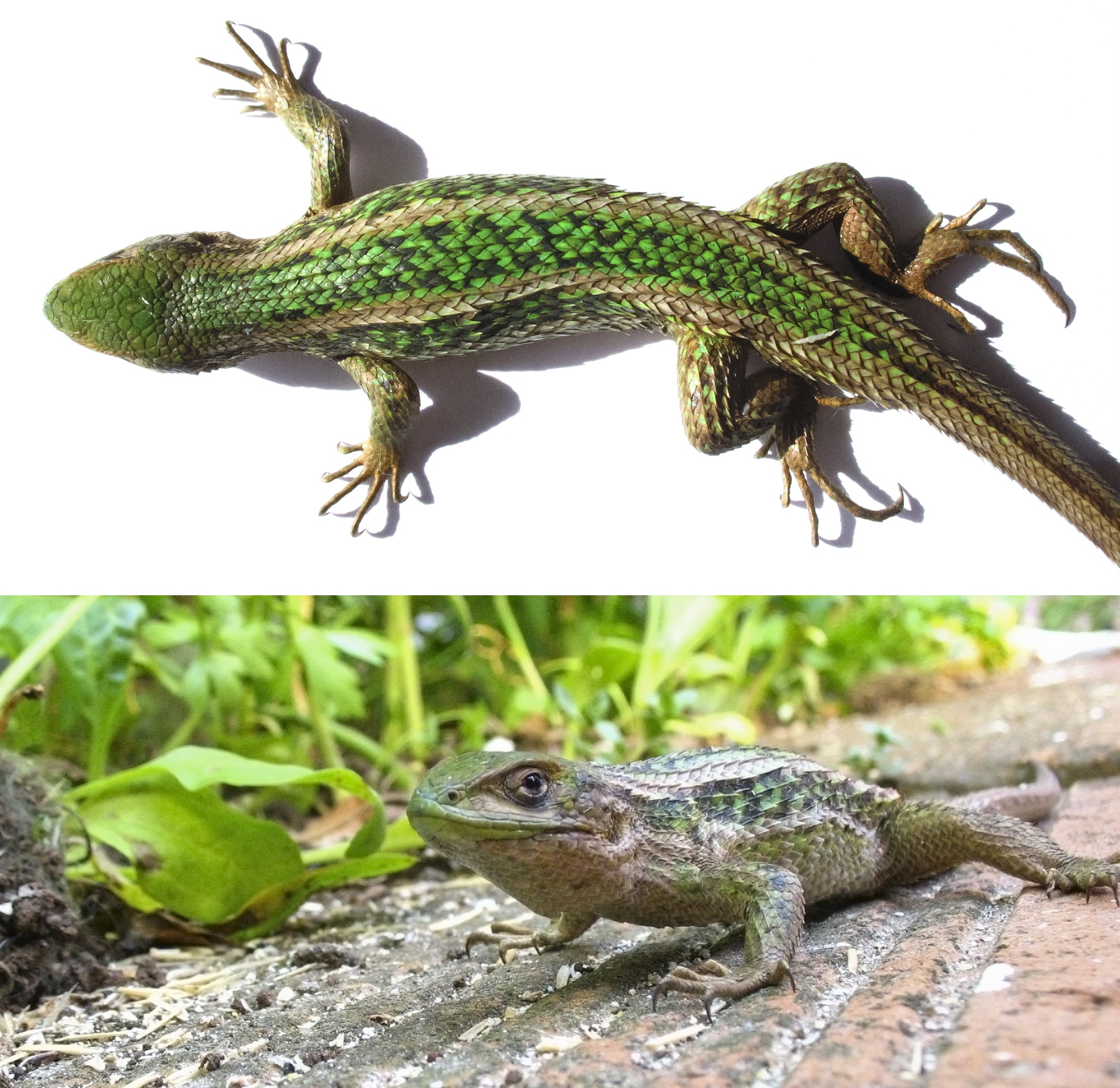

Conservation status
- Least Concern (IUCN 3.1)

Scientific classification
- Kingdom: Animalia
- Phylum: Chordata
- Class: Reptilia
- Order: Squamata
- Suborder: Iguania
- Family: Liolaemidae
- Genus: Liolaemus
- Species: L. chiliensis

Binomial name
- Liolaemus chiliensis (Lesson, 1830)

= Liolaemus chiliensis =

Species of reptile

Liolaemus chiliensis, the Chilean tree iguana, is a species of lizard in the family Liolaemidae, also referred to as the weeping or crying lizard in English. Synonyms for this species include Liodeira chilensis and Calotes chiliensis. Less commonly, it is called the Talcahuano smooth-throated lizard.

This species is well known for its distress calls, although the sound of these calls does not resemble weeping or crying.

The specific name chiliensis is derived from the species' country of origin, Chile. It is endemic to central Chile and southwestern Neuquen Province, Argentina. This iguanid lizard is found inhabiting bushes and branches in open forests and ecotonal scrublands or scrub-steppes, chiefly in the Chilean Matorral ecoregion.

== Taxonomy ==
Many previous phylogenetic studies for L. chiliensis have been incomplete; a more recent biogeographic analysis from 2006 reconstructs the phylogenetic tree of the lizard's genus and resolves controversies about subgrouping of species or subspecies within L. chiliensis. The authors of this study group L. chiliensis with L. curicensis, L. nitidus, L. robertmensi, L. saxatillis, L. gracilis, and L. tandilensis under the robertmensi group. Sources differ in whether they refer to Liolaemus chiliensis as a single species or group of species that includes the majority of species in the genus Liolaemus. Some have distinguished multiple species within L. chiliensis due to differences in "snout-vent length, squamation, and dorsal and ventral colors." Much of the debate revolves around the difference between a subspecies and full species. The Liolaemus genus includes over 160 species, and the chiliensis group of species is thought to include almost half the species in genus. It is hypothesized that chiliensis lizards originated from an Andean-Patagonean area.

== Description ==
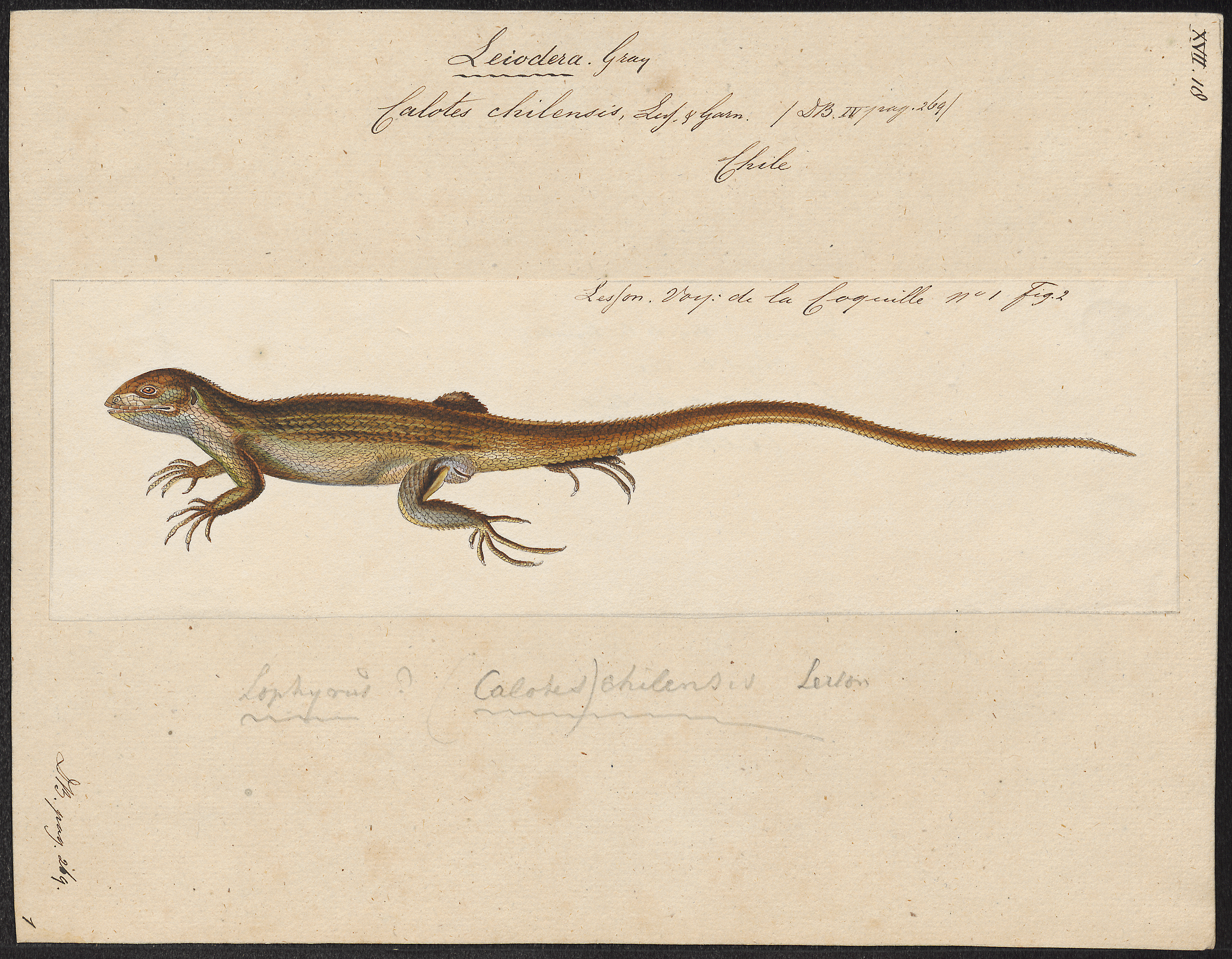
An illustration of Calotes chilensis from 1700-1880

The Chilean tree iguana is relatively large-sized compared to other lizards, reaching 25 centimetres (9.8 in) in total length. It is an oviparous species. It is carnivorous and feeds mainly on insects and other invertebrates. The maximum body weight is 24.03g. L. chiliensis individuals in more southern latitudes tend to be smaller in size than their northern latitude counterparts. Given their geographic distribution, lizards further south experience climates with lower temperatures.

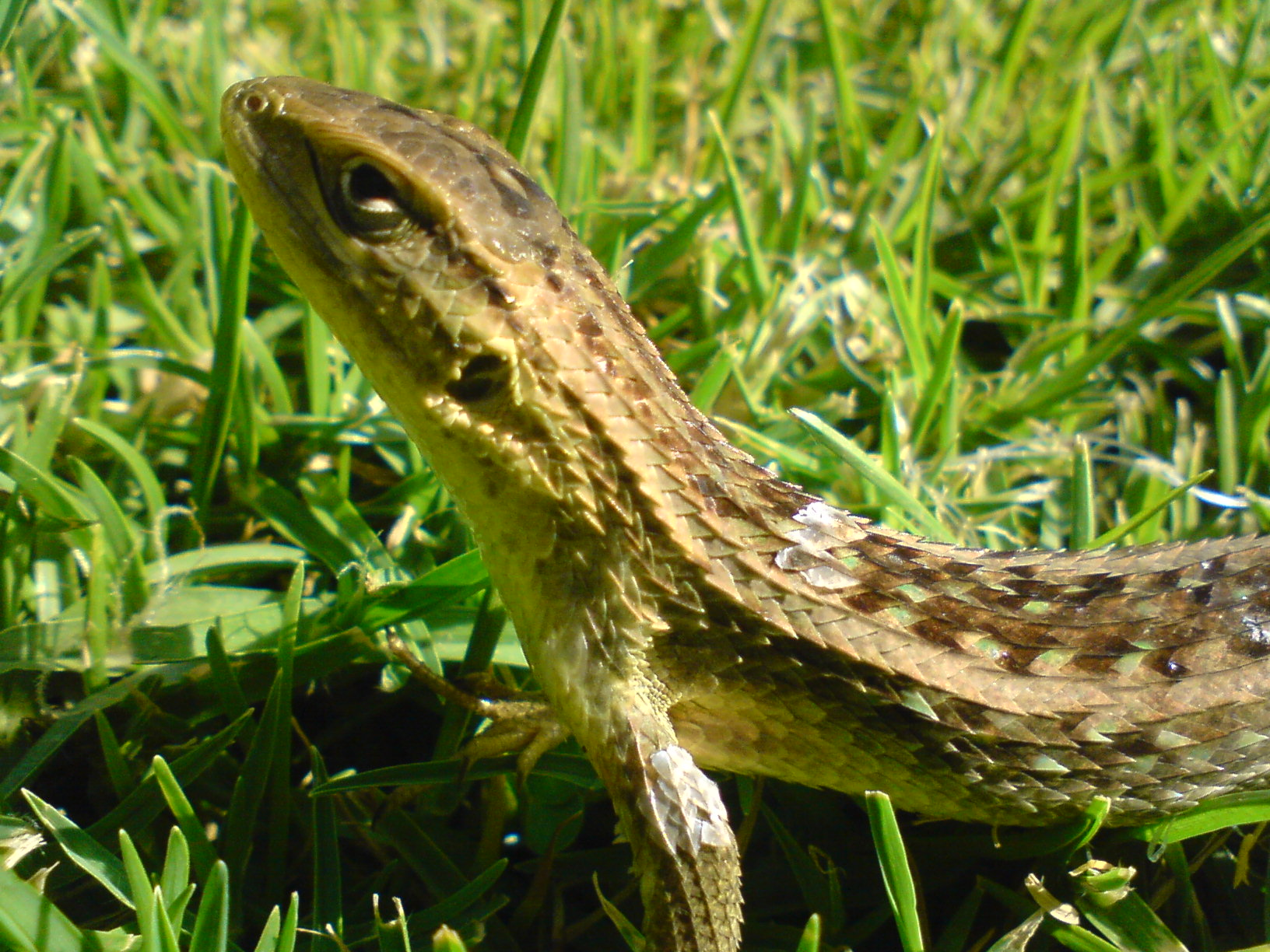
Photo of Lioaemus chilensis from Santiago, Chile in 2009

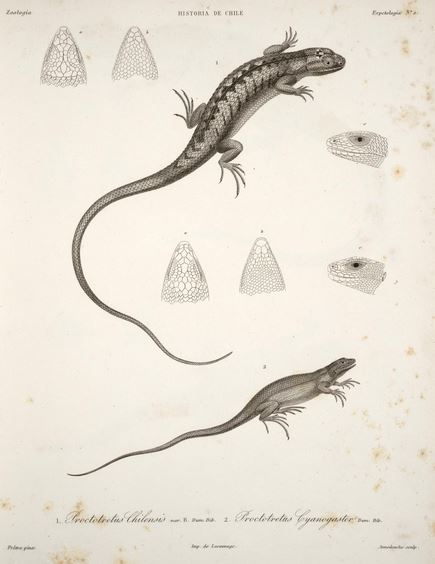
An illustration of Liolaemus chiliensis and Liolaemus cyanogaster

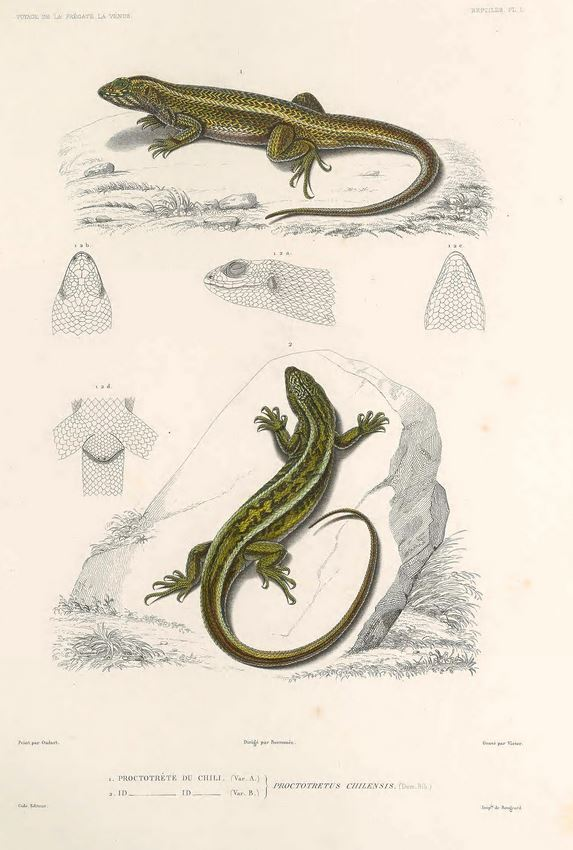
An illustration of Liolaemus chiliensis

These dull-colored lizards tend to be green and gray, helping them camouflage against rocks and vegetation. Axilla groin distance is higher in females than in males. Polyploidy results in morphological differences among lizards of different ploidy (i.e. in head shape and various proportions). The mechanisms behind these physical differences are unclear at this time.

=== Morphology ===
Like most reptiles, this species has a tympanic membrane. Their otoliths help detect both acceleration and sound. Their hearing range extends from 500 Hz to 2000 Hz, with a threshold of 40 dB. These lizards excel at recognizing the distress calls of their own species.

== Polyploidy ==
Polyploidy is rare in non-sterile reptiles, but is common in this species. L. chiliensis has populations with diploid (2n) individuals, triploid (3n) individuals, and diploid-triploid (2n/3n) mosaic lizards. One study found that "33% of females were triploid, 57.1% were mosaics, and 9.5% were diploid" and "86% of L. chiliensis males were mosaics (2n/3n) and 14% were diploids."

Lizards may receive a reduced (n) or unreduced (2n) euploid gamete from their father. In mosaic males, spermatogenesis derives from both diploid and triploid spermatogonia. Although polyploidy can result from interspecific hybridization, Raúl Araya-Donoso, Fernando Torres-Pérez, David Véliz, and Madeleine Lamborot found that a "relationship between hybridization and polyploidy could not be established because triploid and mosaic lizards were hybrids and purebreds."

In general, polyploid individuals can be phenotypically different than diploid individuals. Studies have shown that polyploid individuals can have metabolic differences from diploid individuals, and may be more flexible in adapting to changing environments.

== Habitat and distribution ==
This species is native to the Neotropics. It is also found in the Chilean Matorral, Patagonian Steppe, and Valdivian Temperate Forests, covering a region spanning Chile and Argentina. This lizard lives within the latitudes of 30 and 40°S, and its altitudes are from sea level to 2100 meters.

The habitat of this species includes bushes and branches. These lizards bask in bushes that tend to obscure them from possible predators, which makes it more difficult for predators to spot them. L. chiliensis is adept in running and climbing, and can often be found on branches higher than expected. However, they are typically ground dwellers, found within dense shrubs but not on the ground directly. Their geographical distribution extends from Coquimbo (29°S) to Valdivia (39°S)． L. chiliensis is active throughout the day. Observations tend to be more frequent from September to February, which may be due to its mating season, the warmer weather in these months, or human beings going out more often in warmer weather and consequentially spotting more of these lizards.

== Behavior ==
=== Diet ===
The diet of L. chiliensis consists mostly of insects and small invertebrates. Juveniles behave and hunt similarly to adults. Studies in species within the chiliensis group have identified that these lizards feed mainly on Coleoptera, Hemiptera, and Hymenoptera. Stomach and fecal contents also included parts of grasshoppers, scorpions, plants, Lepidoptera, and Diptera.

=== Eye-bulging ===
These lizards have been observed to display eye-bulging, which is thought to serve a purpose of thermoregulation or even eye-cleaning. This behavior has been observed rarely and only in captivity.

=== Reproduction and life cycle ===
The weeping lizard is oviparous which means that female lizards lay eggs that hatch outside of her after a period of incubation without her presence. Females prefer to lay their eggs underneath rocks, where the eggs gain protection from predators. Females can lay their eggs as early as October, but typically, females are gravid in October and lay eggs in November shortly after the beginning of the warmer season in the Southern hemisphere. Clutches of eggs are usually between 7 and 11 eggs, laid together. The maximum clutch size ever recorded has been 18 eggs. Significant variation in egg clutch size has been documented before. Generally, larger females tend to lay more eggs than smaller females. This trend applies to both mass and volume, since more massive lizards are almost always more voluminous. As a result, previous variation in egg-laying clutch size may actually be a result of unconsidered variation in the sizes of the females who laid the clutches.

=== Distress calls ===
Vocal sound production is rare in lizards outside of Gekkota. The vast majority of non-Gekkota lizards are voiceless, with the exception of the weeping lizard, which is the only species in this 'voiceless' genus that can vocalize. Weeping lizards are known to produce "distress calls" when stressed, cornered, or threatened, including when seized by humans. Both males and females produces these calls, which are known to sound more like squeaks than hisses or weeping. Thought to be produced by the larynx, these sounds extend into the ultrasonic range. These distress calls can be heard several meters away from the lizard producing them. These calls increase fear in other lizards. When scared, L. chiliensis become immobile and delay any attempts to escape. The presence of a somewhat consistently high risk of predation reduces the activity of these lizards over long-term observation.

Distress calls can vary in frequency, linearity, and the presence of harmonics. Compared to females, males tend to emit calls that are louder, more linear, and less complicated. The vocalizations are thought to serve two purposes: 1) they cause antipredatory behavior in conspecific neighbors and 2) possibly deter predators. Complex (nonlinear, erratic) calls have been shown to induce more fear in conspecific lizards than simple calls; the producer of the call may have less control over his or her call if there is a more alarming threat. Distress calls are also more distressed when heard in a familiar environment. Lizards may feel safer in a familiar environment, and therefore more alarmed by surprising causes of distress. On the other hand, the distress calls have been shown to reduce snake predation via a temporary reduction in their exploration, although there is a risk that the vocalization helps a predator narrow down the vocalizer's location. Although seemingly counterintuitive, attracting multiple predators with a vocalization would also serve to be advantageous, because the larger predators would prioritize its safety and the possible conflict with approaching secondary or primary predators in the proximity. When L. chiliensis could also detect the chemical scents of other weeping lizards, they mobilized more quickly and more often compared to without the scent. Without the scent, lizards froze to avoid detection; when other members of the same species were thought to be around, they were quicker to try escaping. Distress calls therefore have been evolutionarily advantageous, increasing the chances of survival both with or without other lizards present.

Members of L. chiliensis from different regions have also shown the ability to distinguish calls from individuals of their own region. Individual L. chiliensis in the northern area tend to react only to distress calls from other northern lizards, whereas southern lizards respond to distress calls from both northern and southern lizards. Given that southern lizards tend to be smaller in size, their perceived risk of predation may be higher, causing increased sensitivity to distress calls produced by weeping lizards of any region. More research is needed into their means of evasion and escape.

While these distress calls can serve many advantageous purposes for the weeping lizard, there is evidence that the species Liolaemus lemniscatus will eavesdrop of these distress calls. This ability allows the Liolaemus lemniscatus to better escape its weeping lizard predator because the distress calls can serve as information of predation risk to the prey of weeping lizards. Therefore, these distress calls might negatively impact the weeping lizards' ability to capture prey.

=== Intraspecific interactions ===
A study from the Journal of Herpetology suggests that L. chiliensis can detect other members of their species via the presence of lipids in recently deposited feces; however, there is no evidence of further recognition beyond the knowledge that another member of the same species is nearby. Both male and females can detect female precloacal secretions of fellow L. chiliensis. Once detected, these female secretions prompt exploration and movement of both sexes. Higher interest and exploration are exhibited in males that are possibly seeking a mate. Similarly, females may benefit from releasing these secretions by attracting potential mates.

=== Interspecific interactions ===
L. chiliensis is sometimes preyed upon by the Chilean Green Racer (Philodryas chamissonis). Spauligodon, a genus of host-specific nematodes, is a parasite towards these lizards. Liolaemus lizards are the most preyed upon lizard in their native Chilean habitat, due to their abundance and ecological niche. Furthermore, these lizards are capable of detecting predatory snakes through scent. Detection resulted in a corresponding decrease in activity from the lizard.

== Conservation ==
L. chiliensis are kept as pets, although such a practice violates conservation biology principles, because of the limited range of L. Chiliensis, and is thus vulnerable to habitat disruption and population decline. The species has no history of endangerment or near extinction; today, it is a species of least concern. Their popularity as a pet remains, due to their common presence within this range and their distress calls. These lizards have been photographed being held in human hands near its habitat in natural terrain, suggesting either that a human was able to quickly seize a cautious lizard or that the lizard was curious and calm enough to let itself be held.
