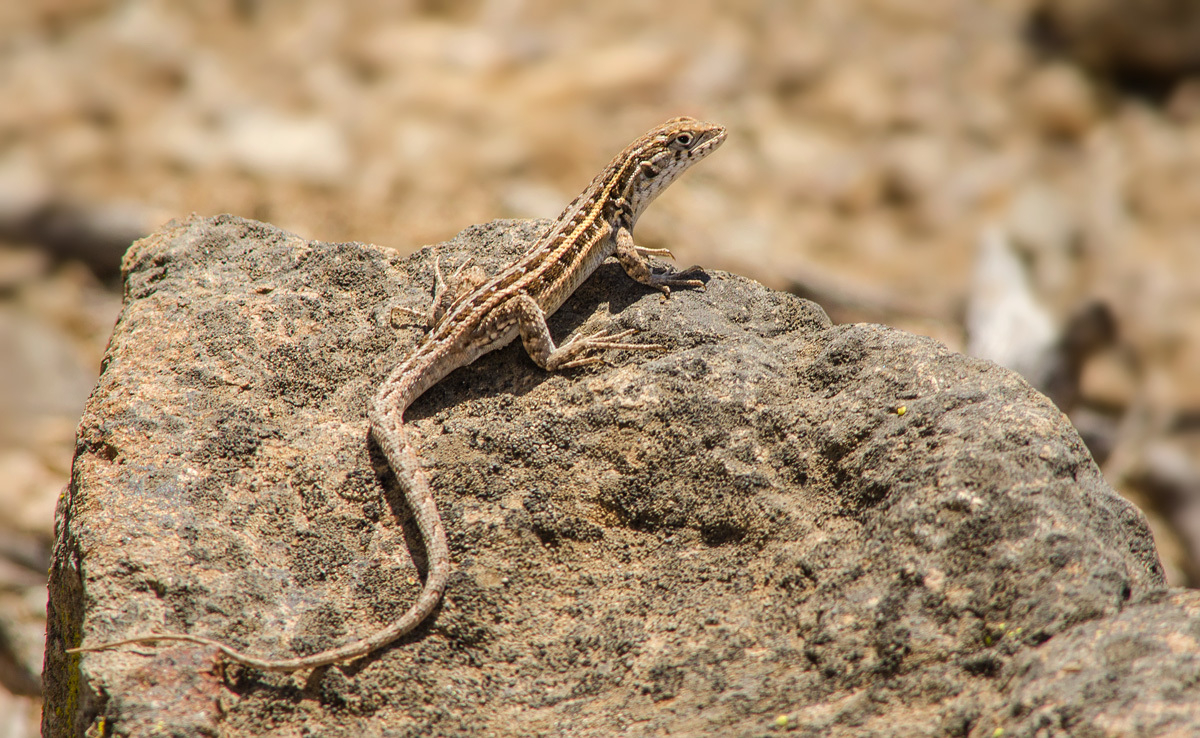
- L. pseudolemniscatus in Choapa Province, Coquimbo, Chile

Conservation status
- Least Concern (IUCN 3.1)

Scientific classification
- Kingdom: Animalia
- Phylum: Chordata
- Class: Reptilia
- Order: Squamata
- Suborder: Iguania
- Family: Liolaemidae
- Genus: Liolaemus
- Species: L. pseudolemniscatus

Binomial name
- Liolaemus pseudolemniscatus Lamborot & Ortiz, 1990

= Liolaemus pseudolemniscatus =

Species of Lizard

Liolaemus pseudolemniscatus is a species of lizard in the family Liolaemidae. It is endemic to Chile, with occurrence noted in the Chilean matorral.
