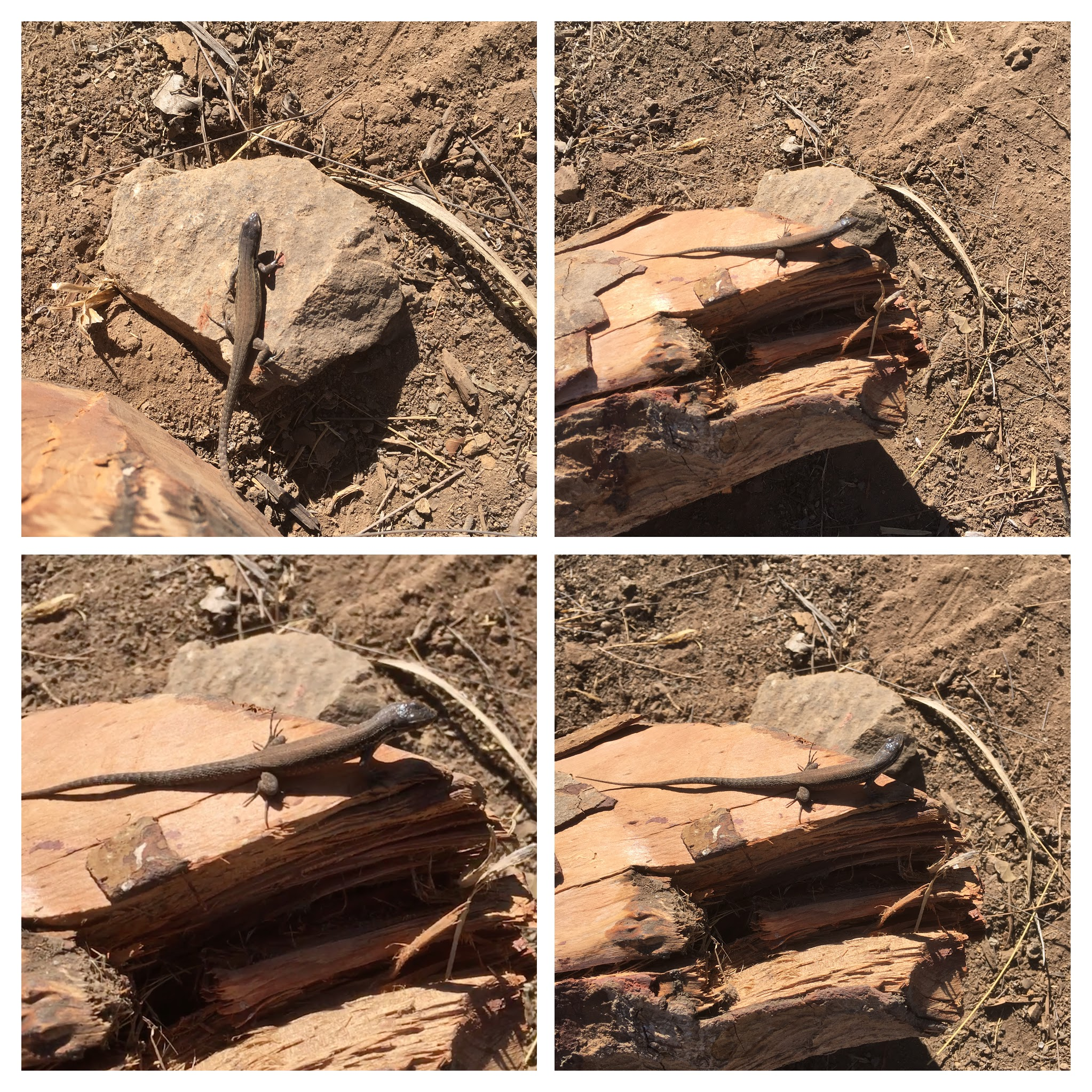

Conservation status
- Least Concern (IUCN 3.1)

Scientific classification
- Kingdom: Animalia
- Phylum: Chordata
- Class: Reptilia
- Order: Squamata
- Suborder: Iguania
- Family: Liolaemidae
- Genus: Liolaemus
- Species: L. fuscus

Binomial name
- Liolaemus fuscus Boulenger, 1885

= Liolaemus fuscus =

Species of lizard

Liolaemus fuscus, the brown tree iguana, is a species of lizard in the family Iguanidae. It is found in parts of western Argentina and central Chile in the Chilean matorral ecoregion. The conservation status of this iguana is classified as Data Deficient (DD).
