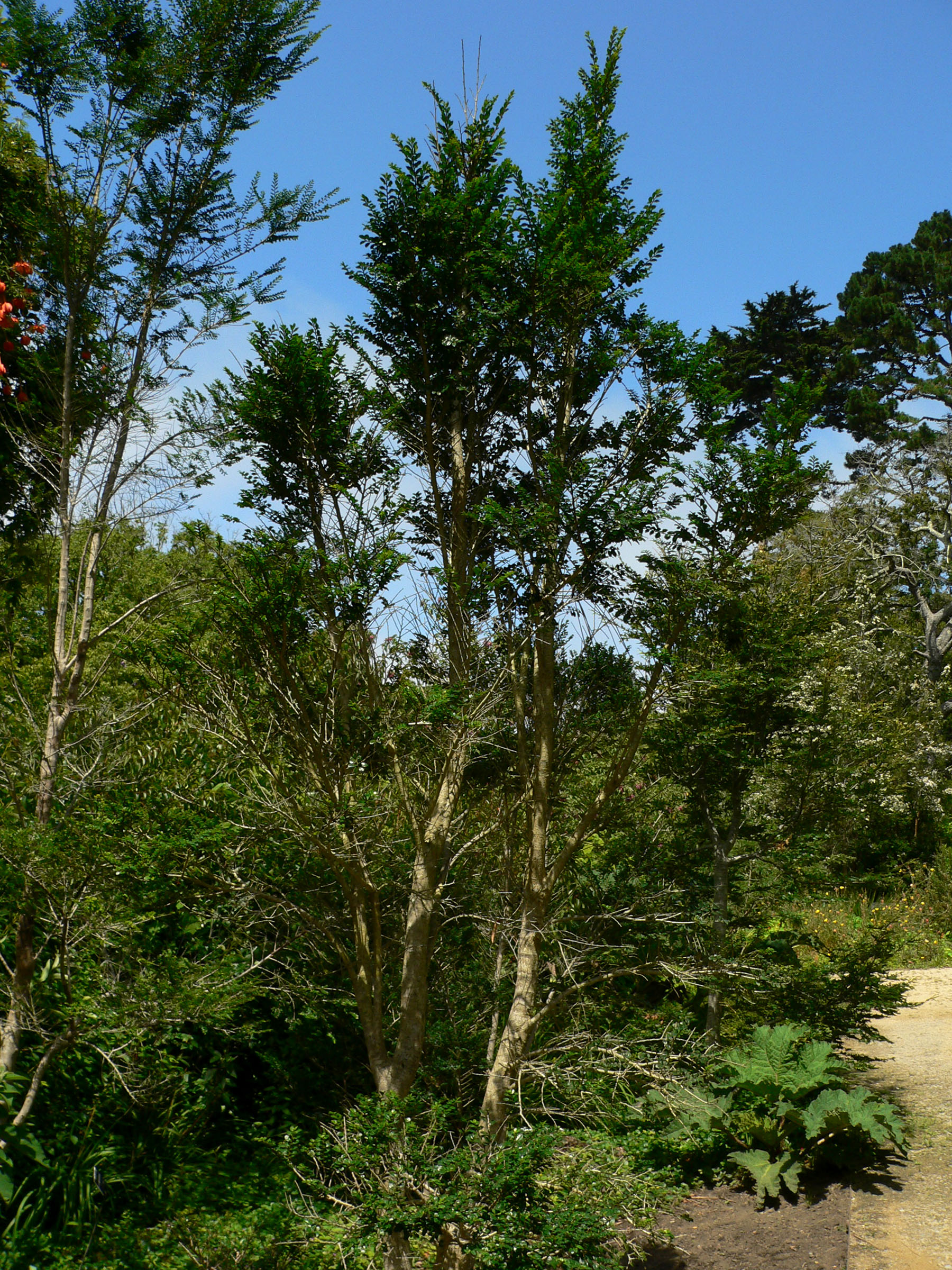

Scientific classification
- Kingdom: Plantae
- Clade: Embryophytes
- Clade: Tracheophytes
- Clade: Spermatophytes
- Clade: Angiosperms
- Clade: Eudicots
- Clade: Rosids
- Order: Malpighiales
- Family: Salicaceae
- Genus: Azara
- Species: A. microphylla

Binomial name
- Azara microphylla Hook.f.

= Azara microphylla =

Species of flowering plant

Azara microphylla, the boxleaf azara, is a species of flowering plant in the willow family Salicaceae, native to Chile and Argentina. Growing to 10 metres (33 ft), it is a small, upright, evergreen tree or large shrub. It has small, shiny, very dark green leaves and tiny, vanilla-scented flowers in winter. It is the hardiest of the azaras, withstanding temperatures down to −15 °C (5 °F), but in cooler temperate regions requires some protection from cold winds. It also tolerates full shade.

The specific epithet microphylla means "small-leaved". The leaves are no more than 2.5 cm (1 in) long.

This plant has gained the Royal Horticultural Society's Award of Garden Merit.
