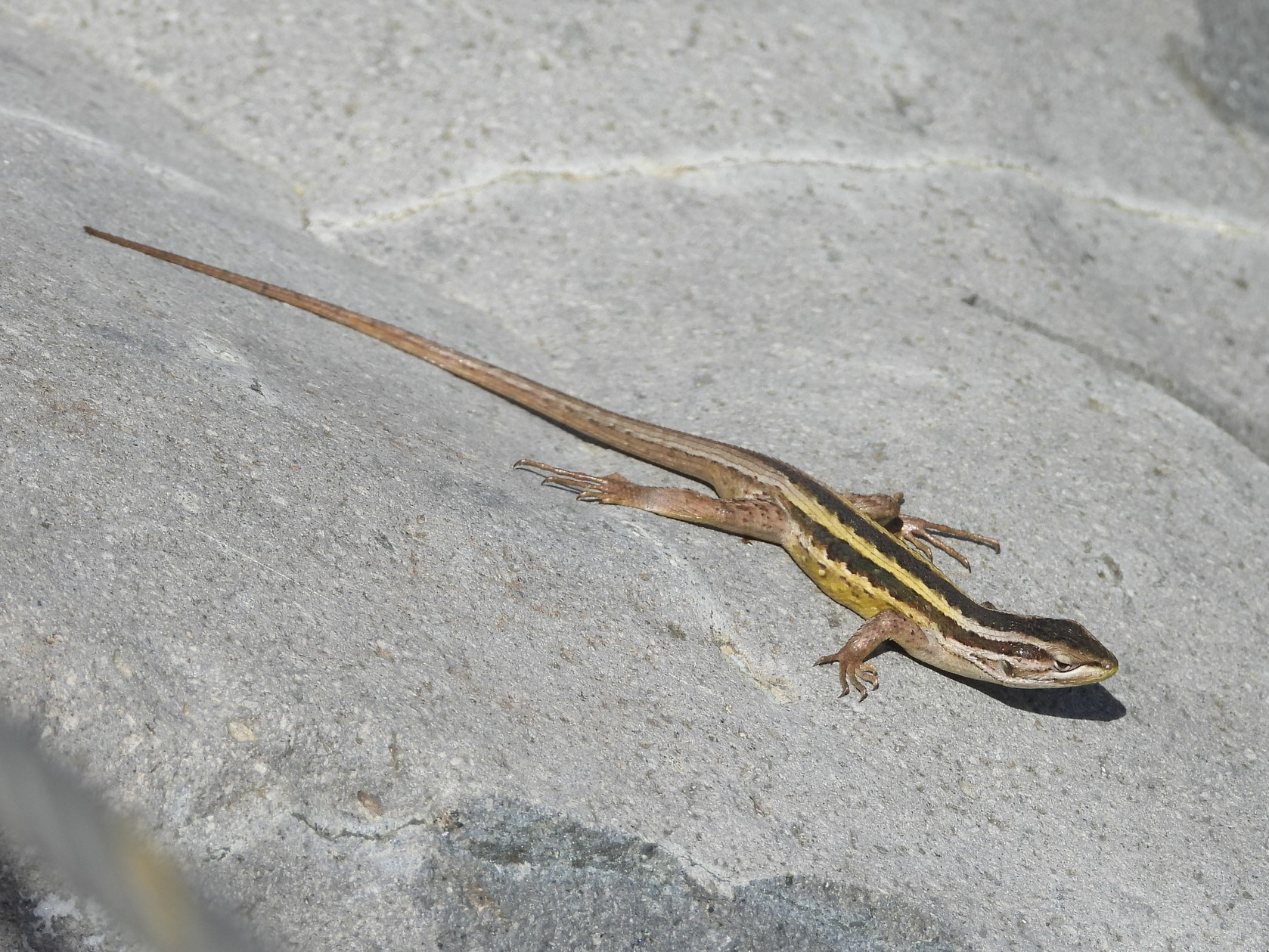

Conservation status
- Least Concern (IUCN 3.1)

Scientific classification
- Kingdom: Animalia
- Phylum: Chordata
- Class: Reptilia
- Order: Squamata
- Suborder: Iguania
- Family: Liolaemidae
- Genus: Liolaemus
- Species: L. schroederi

Binomial name
- Liolaemus schroederi L. Müller & Hellmich, 1938

= Liolaemus schroederi =

Species of lizard

Liolaemus schroederi (Schroeder's tree iguana) is a species of lizard in the family Liolaemidae. The species is endemic to Chile, where it is found in the Chilean matorral.

== Etymology ==
The specific name, schroederi, is in honor of American ichthyologist William Charles Schroeder.

== Sources ==
- Hogan, C. Michael, & World Wildlife Fund (2013). Chilean matorral. ed. M.McGinley. Encyclopedia of Earth. National Council for Science and the Environment. Washington DC
- World Conservation Monitoring Centre (1996). IUCN Red List of Threatened Species.
- Müller, L. (1938). "Beiträge zur Kenntnis der Herpetofauna Chiles. XI. Über zwei neue Liolaemus-formen aus der chilenischen Kordillere (Sammlung Schröder) ". Zoologischer Anzeiger 122: 225–237. (Liolaemus schroederi, new species). (in German).
