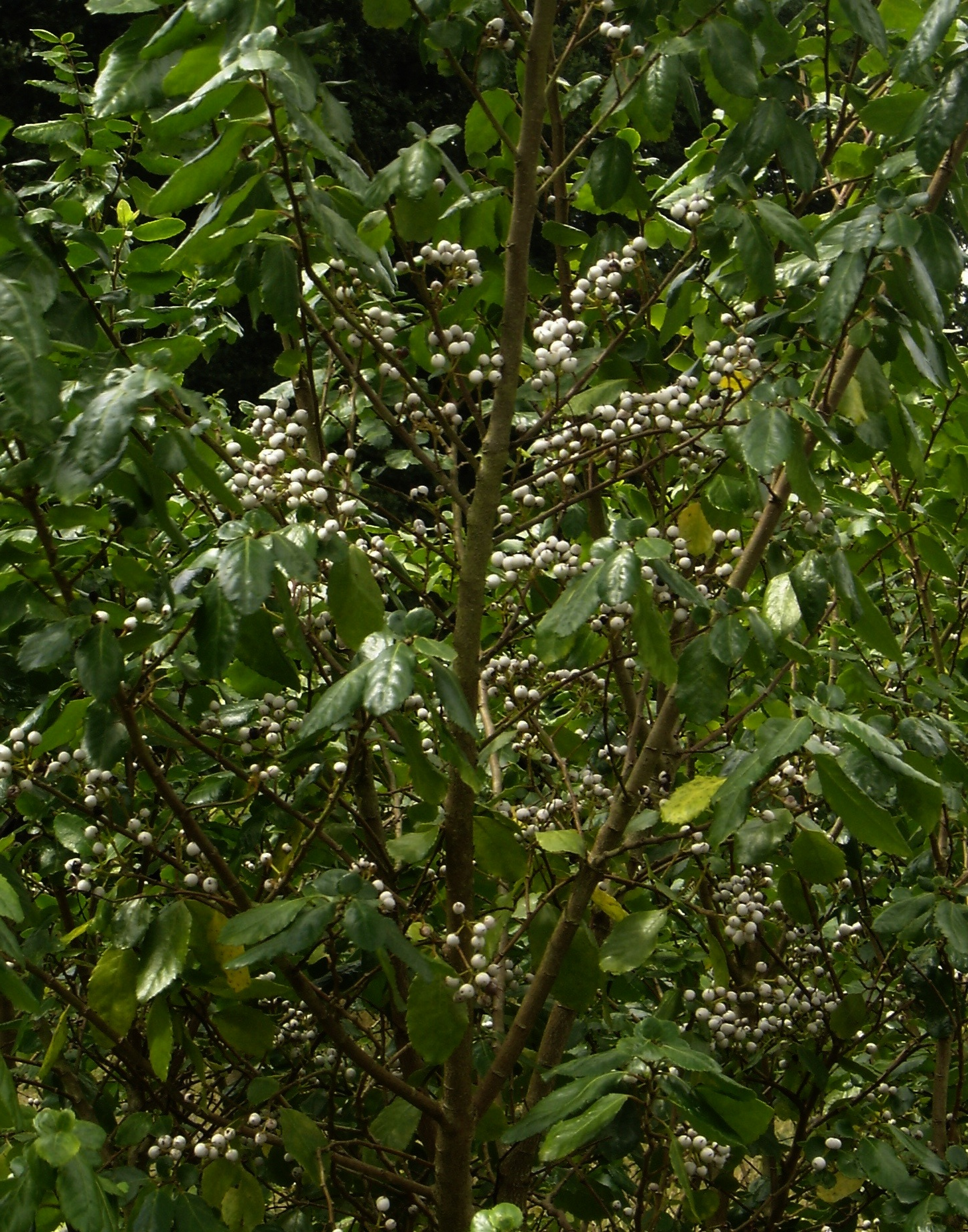
- Azara serrata foliage and fruit

Conservation status
- Least Concern (IUCN 3.1)

Scientific classification
- Kingdom: Plantae
- Clade: Tracheophytes
- Clade: Angiosperms
- Clade: Eudicots
- Clade: Rosids
- Order: Malpighiales
- Family: Salicaceae
- Genus: Azara
- Species: A. serrata

Binomial name
- Azara serrata Ruiz & Pav.

Varieties
- Azara serrata var. fernandeziana (Gay) Reiche; Azara serrata var. serrata

= Azara serrata =

Species of flowering plant

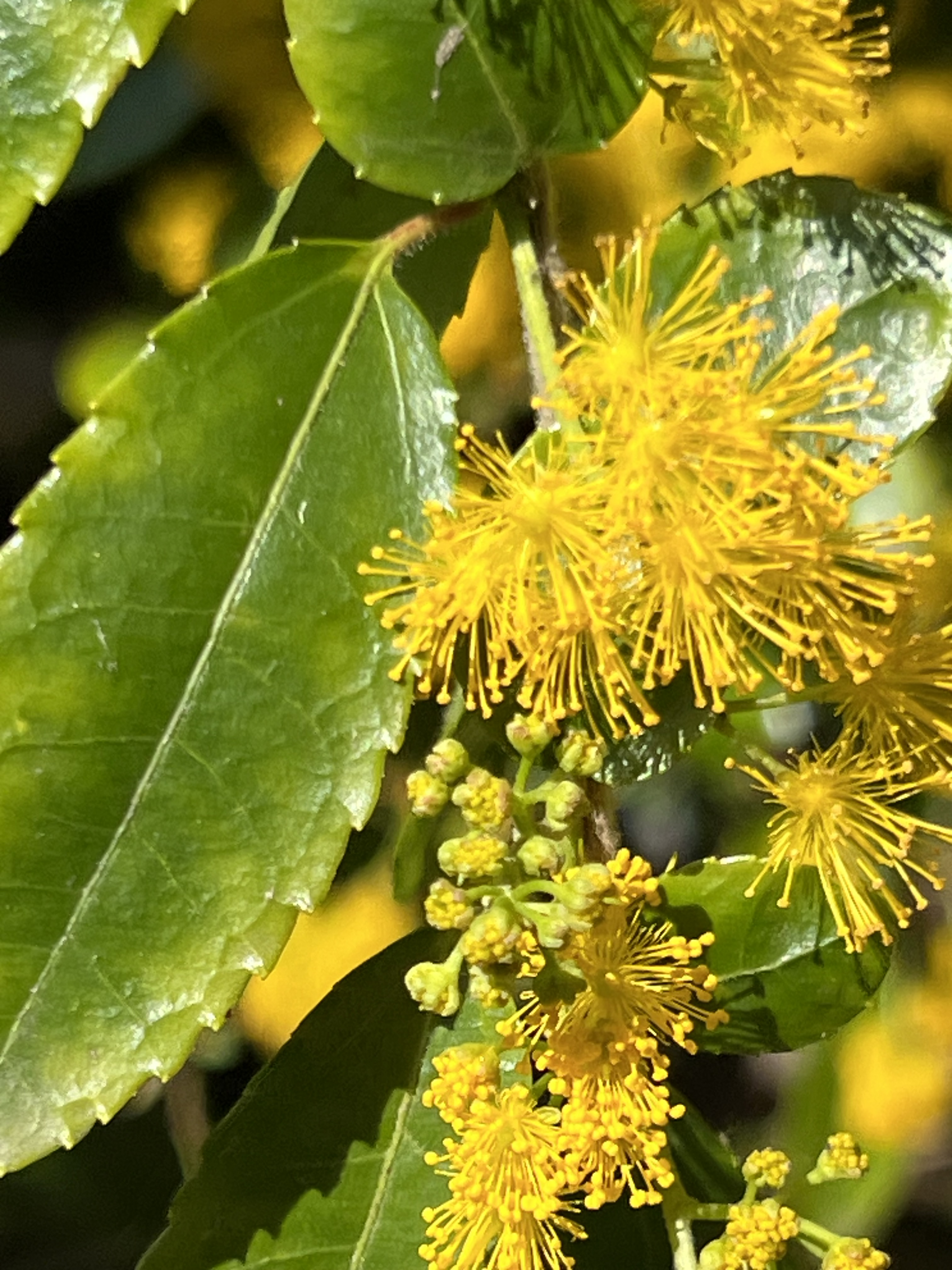
Flowers

Azara serrata, the saw-toothed azara, is a species of flowering plant in the family Salicaceae. It is endemic to Chile. It is an evergreen shrub growing to 4 m (13 ft), with glossy serrated leaves and clusters of scented yellow flowers in summer. In temperate regions it requires a sheltered position.

Two varieties are accepted:

- Azara serrata var. fernandeziana (Gay) Reiche – Juan Fernández Islands
- Azara serrata var. serrata – central and southern Chile

This species has gained the Royal Horticultural Society's Award of Garden Merit.
