= Liolaemus curicensis =

Conservation status
- Least Concern (IUCN 3.1)

Scientific classification
- Kingdom: Animalia
- Phylum: Chordata
- Class: Reptilia
- Order: Squamata
- Suborder: Iguania
- Family: Liolaemidae
- Genus: Liolaemus
- Species: L. curicensis

Binomial name
- Liolaemus curicensis Müller & Hellmich, 1938

Species of lizard

Liolaemus curicensis, commonly known as the Curicen tree iguana, is a species of lizard in the family Liolaemidae. It is native to Chile.
