= Río Blanco National Reserve =

Nature reserve in Chile

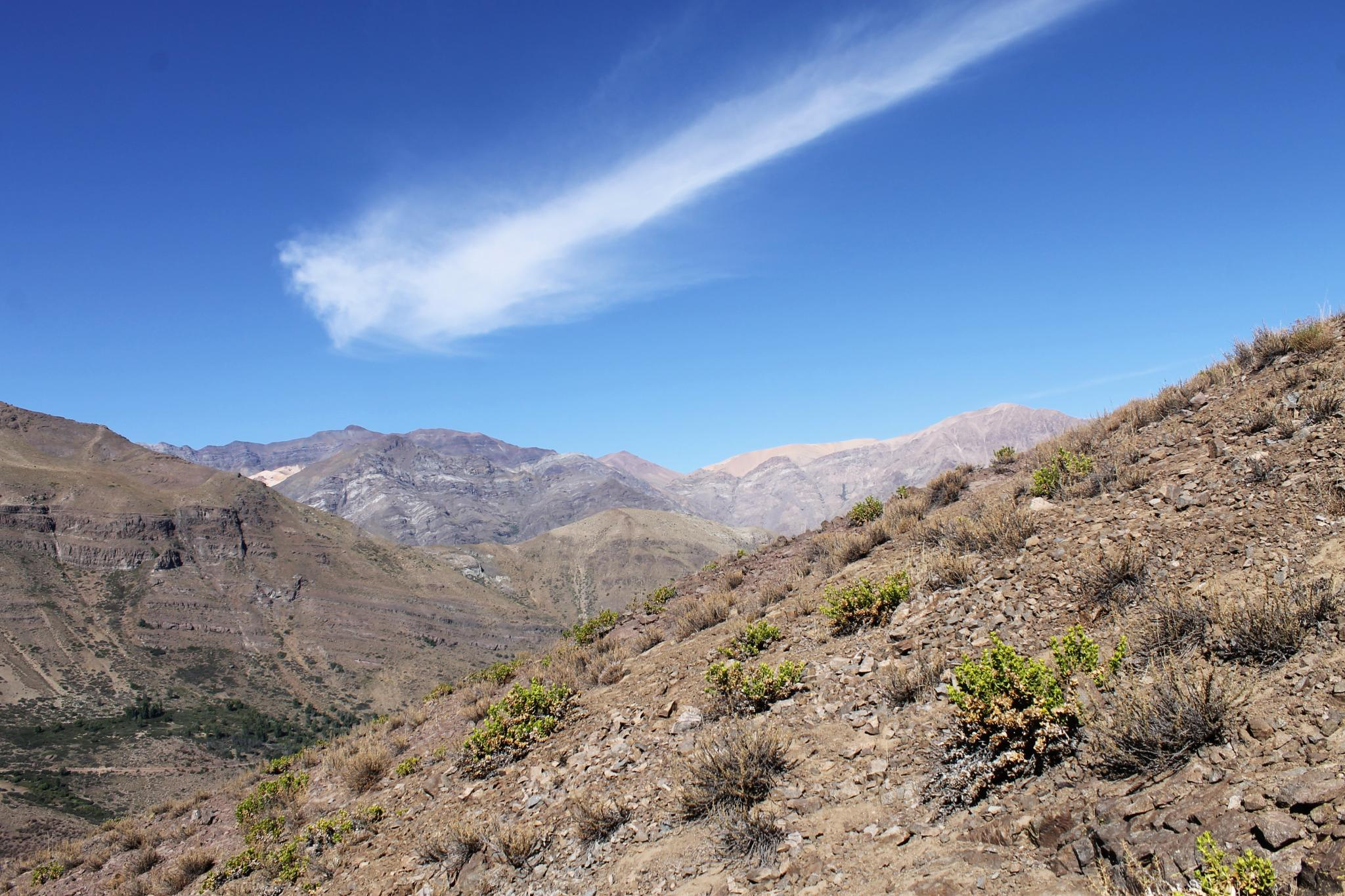
- Interactive map of Río Blanco National Reserve
- Location: Valparaiso Region, Chile
- Coordinates: 32°57′00″S 072°18′30″W
- Area: 0.1 km^{2} (0.039 sq mi)
- Designation: Forest reserve, national reserve
- Designated: 1932
- Governing body: Corporación Nacional Forestal (CONAF)

Río Blanco National Reserve is a national reserve in Valparaiso Region of Chile, 60 kilometres (37 mi) northeast of Santiago.
