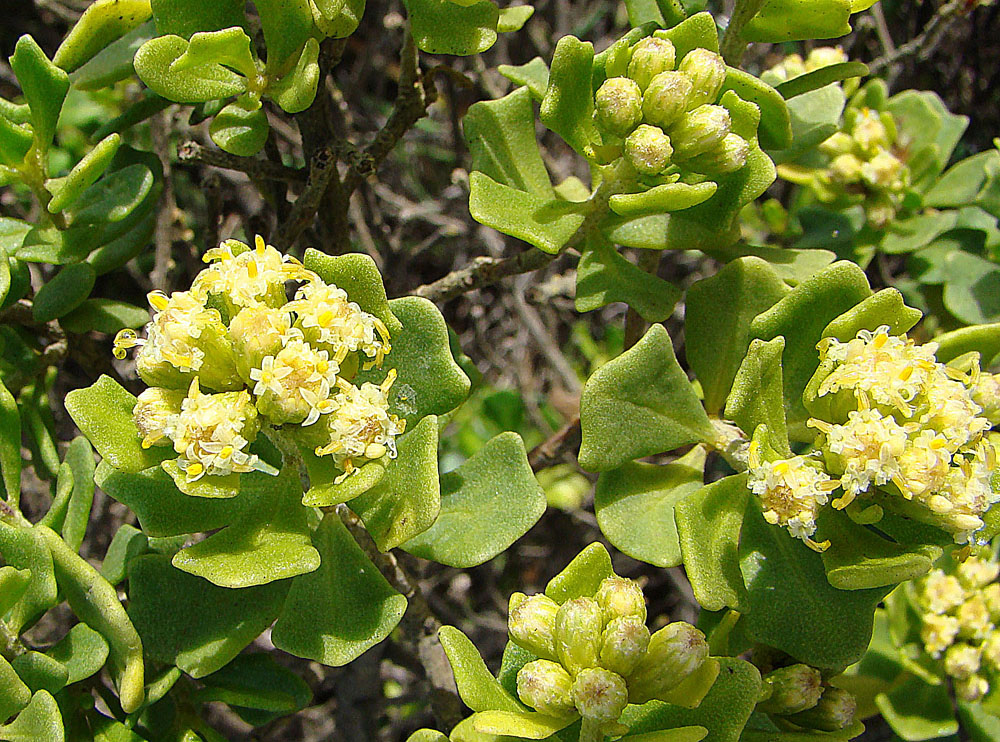

Scientific classification
- Kingdom: Plantae
- Clade: Tracheophytes
- Clade: Angiosperms
- Clade: Eudicots
- Clade: Asterids
- Order: Asterales
- Family: Asteraceae
- Genus: Baccharis
- Species: B. macraei

Binomial name
- Baccharis macraei Hook. & Arn., 1840
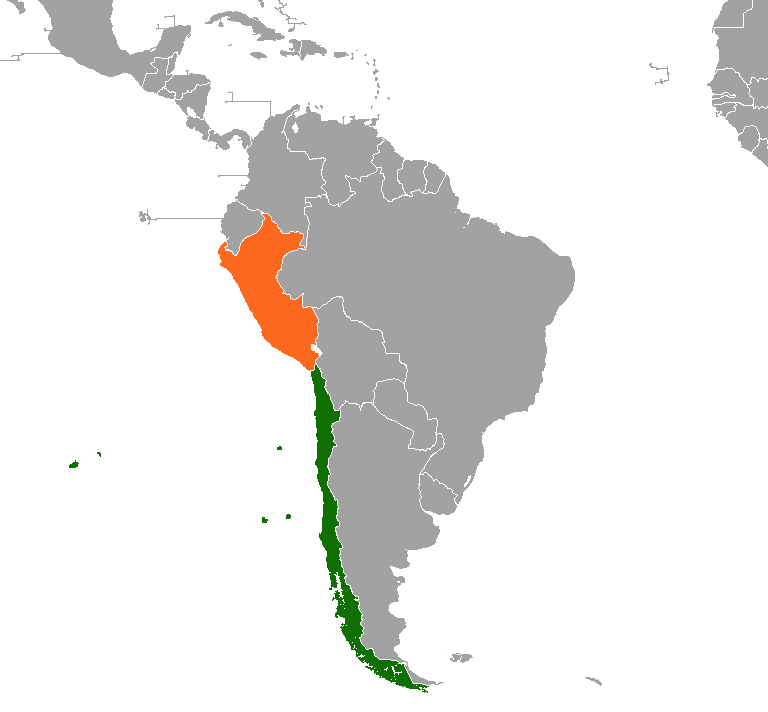
- Distribution of Baccharis macraei

Synonyms
- Baccharis macraei var. lucida Heering

= Baccharis macraei =

Species of flowering plant

Baccharis macraei is a species of shrub native to Chile and Peru.

== Description ==
The plants are 50–150 cm tall shrubs. The branching angle is relatively wide. In the first few years the stems are covered in dense trichomes, which lead to the impression of a round stem. However the stems are edged underneath. With age the stems become greyish brown, shiny and rugose. The firm, waxy leaves, which only have a lifespan of one year, are grouped at the apex of branches. They are obovate and have a toothed margin. The apical leaves envelop the singular, terminal, sessile inflorescences. The capitulum is 5–7 mm wide in male plants and 4–7.5 mm wide in female plants.

== Natural hybridisation ==
This species is part of a homoploid hybrid swarm involving Baccharis linearis. Together both parent species form the natural hybrid Baccharis intermedia.
