= Morro Moreno National Park =

National park in Chile

- IUCN category II (national park)
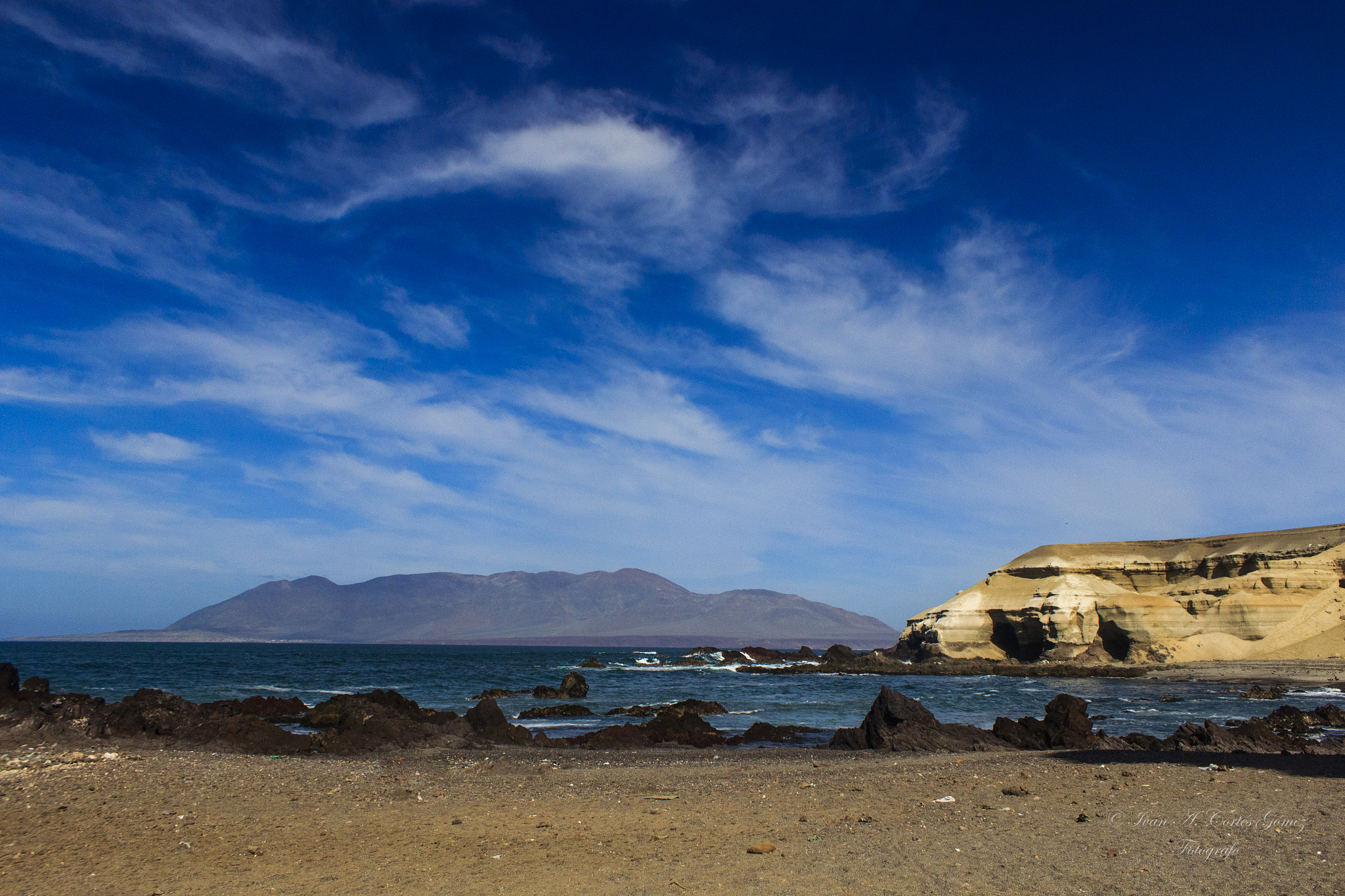

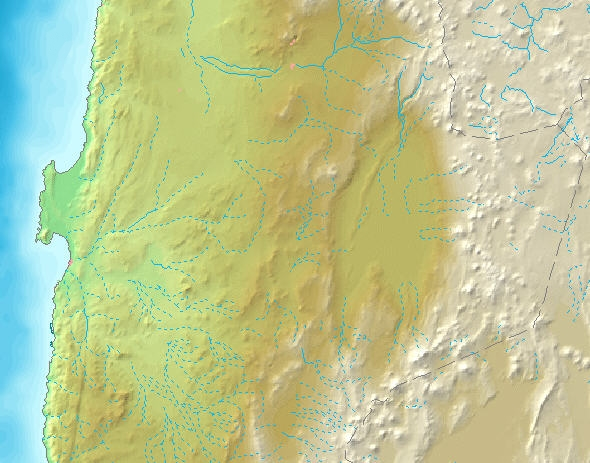
- Location within Región de Antofagasta
- Location: Antofagasta Region, Chile
- Nearest city: Antofagasta
- Coordinates: 23°27′S 70°33′W
- Area: 73.14 km^{2} (28.24 sq mi)
- Designation: National Park
- Designated: 2010
- Governing body: Corporación Nacional Forestal (CONAF)

Morro Moreno National Park is a national park in northern Chile. It is located on a coastal headland in Antofagasta Region, northwest of the city of Antofagasta.
