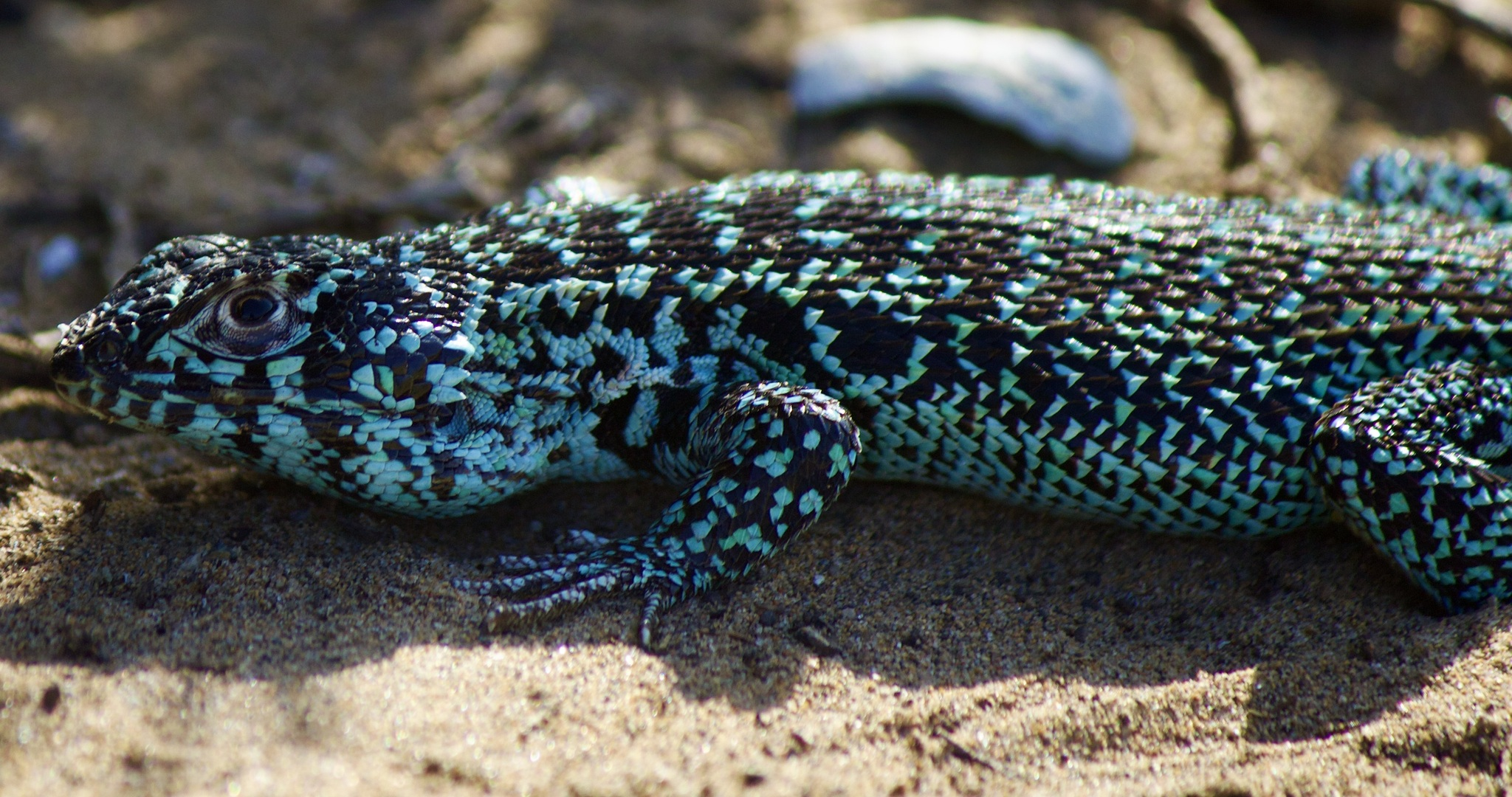

Conservation status
- Least Concern (IUCN 3.1)

Scientific classification
- Kingdom: Animalia
- Phylum: Chordata
- Class: Reptilia
- Order: Squamata
- Suborder: Iguania
- Family: Liolaemidae
- Genus: Liolaemus
- Species: L. zapallarensis

Binomial name
- Liolaemus zapallarensis (Müller & Hellmich, 1933)

= Liolaemus zapallarensis =

Species of lizard

Liolaemus zapallarensis is a species of lizard in the family Liolaemidae. It is endemic to Chile.

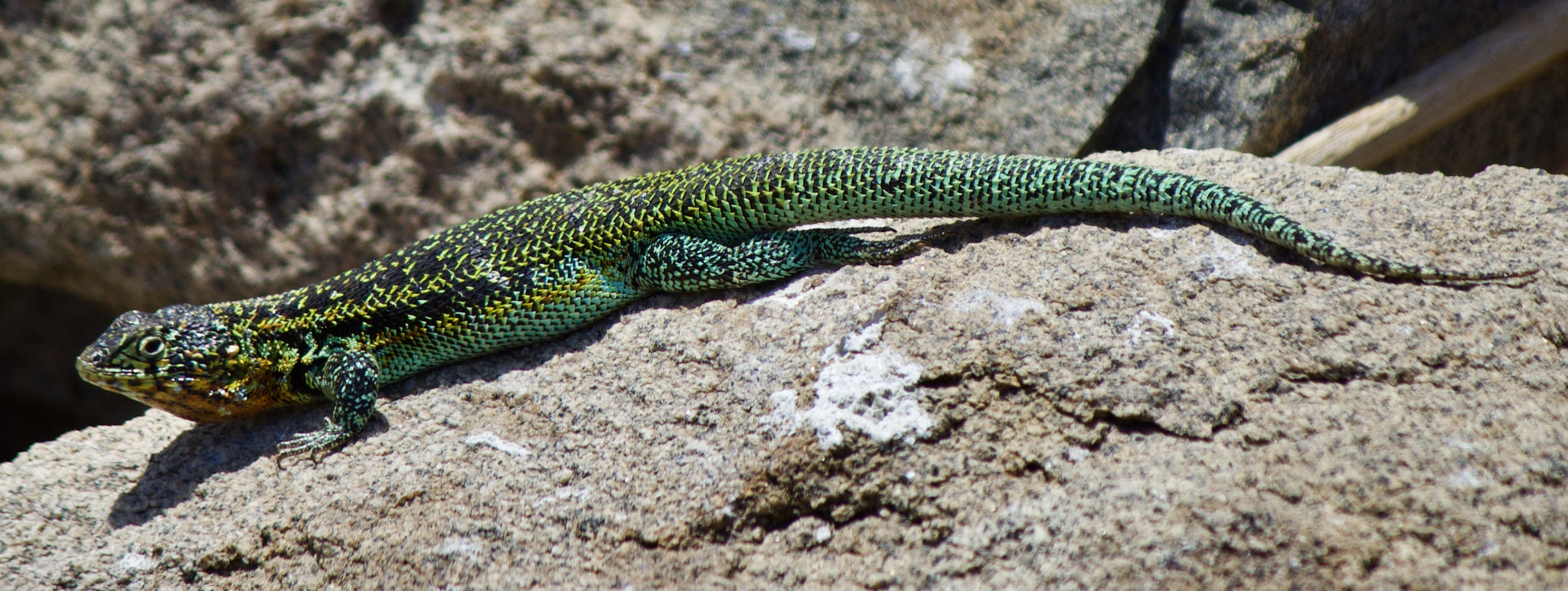
In Chile
