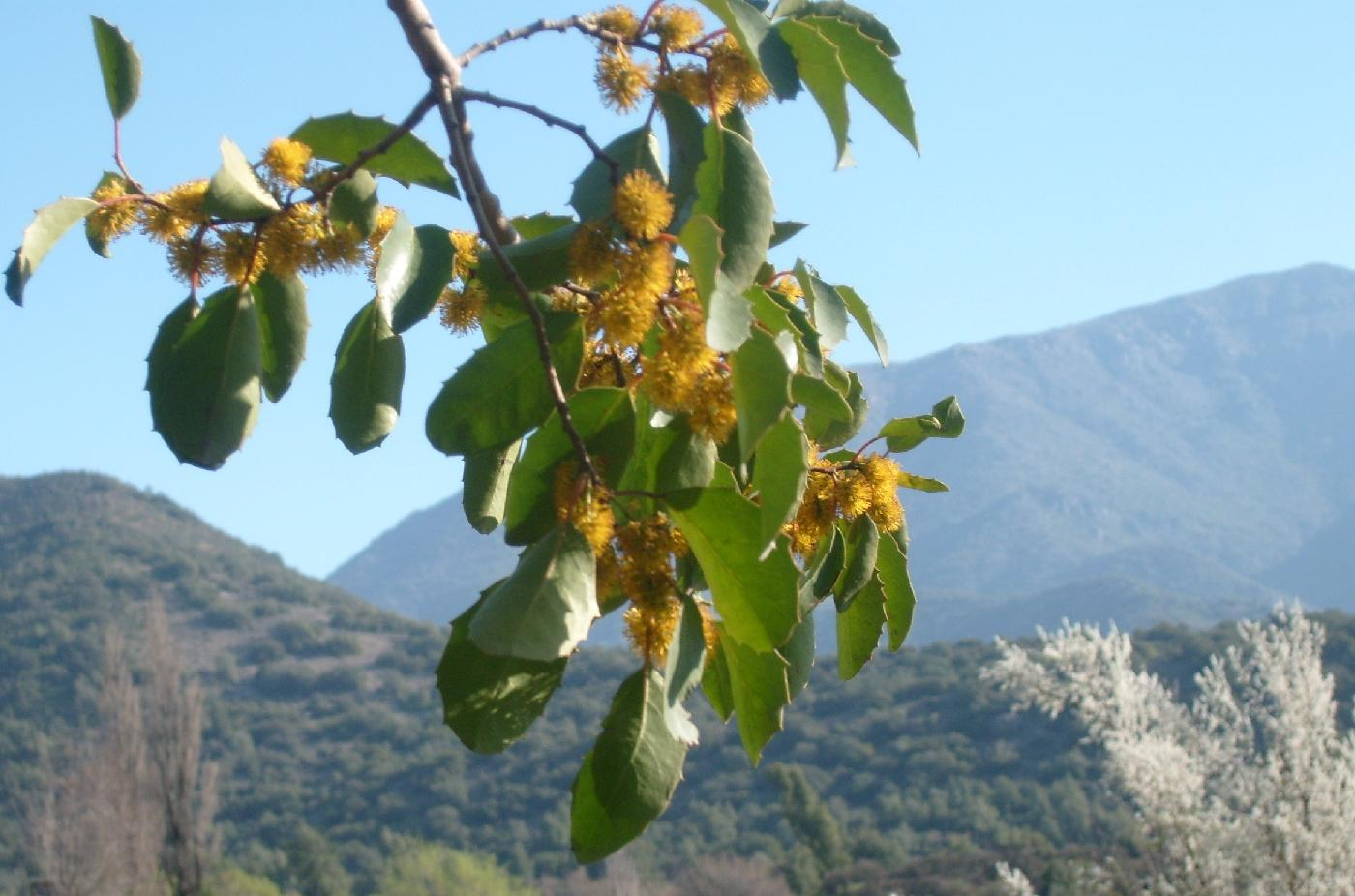
- Azara dentata

Scientific classification
- Kingdom: Plantae
- Clade: Tracheophytes
- Clade: Angiosperms
- Clade: Eudicots
- Clade: Rosids
- Order: Malpighiales
- Family: Salicaceae
- Subfamily: Salicoideae
- Tribe: Saliceae
- Genus: Azara; Ruiz & Pav. (1794)

Species
- See text

Synonyms
- Arechavaletaia Speg. Staphylorhodos Turcz.

= Azara (plant) =

Genus of flowering plants

Azara is a genus of eleven species of flowering plants in the family Salicaceae.

== Habitat and distribution ==
They are native to temperate to subtropical regions of South America, from southern Brazil and Bolivia to southern Argentina and Chile. They are most often found at woodland margins and lakesides. Azara was formerly classed in the family Flacourtiaceae.

== Description ==
They are evergreen shrubs and small trees growing to 1–8 m tall. The leaves are alternate, or in some species they appear paired, are simple 1–9 cm long and 0.5–5 cm broad. The opposite-leaved appearance of some species is unusual in that one stipule is enlarged giving the appearance of opposite ["paired"] leaves. The flowers are small, yellow or greenish, strongly fragrant, with a 4-5-lobed calyx and no petals but conspicuous long, often brightly colored, stamens; flowering is in spring. The fruit is a red to black berry 3–10 mm diameter.

Several species are cultivated as ornamental plants in gardens. In temperate regions they require the shelter of a wall.

== List of species ==
Eleven species are currently accepted:

- Azara alpina Poepp. & Endl.
- Azara celastrina D.Don
- Azara dentata Ruiz & Pav.
- Azara integrifolia Ruiz & Pav. – goldspire azara
- Azara intermedia Gay
- Azara lanceolata Hook.f. – lanceleaf azara
- Azara microphylla Hook.f. – boxleaf azara
- Azara petiolaris (D.Don) I.M.Johnst. – holly azara
- Azara salicifolia Griseb.
- Azara serrata Ruiz & Pav.
- Azara uruguayensis (Speg.) Sleumer

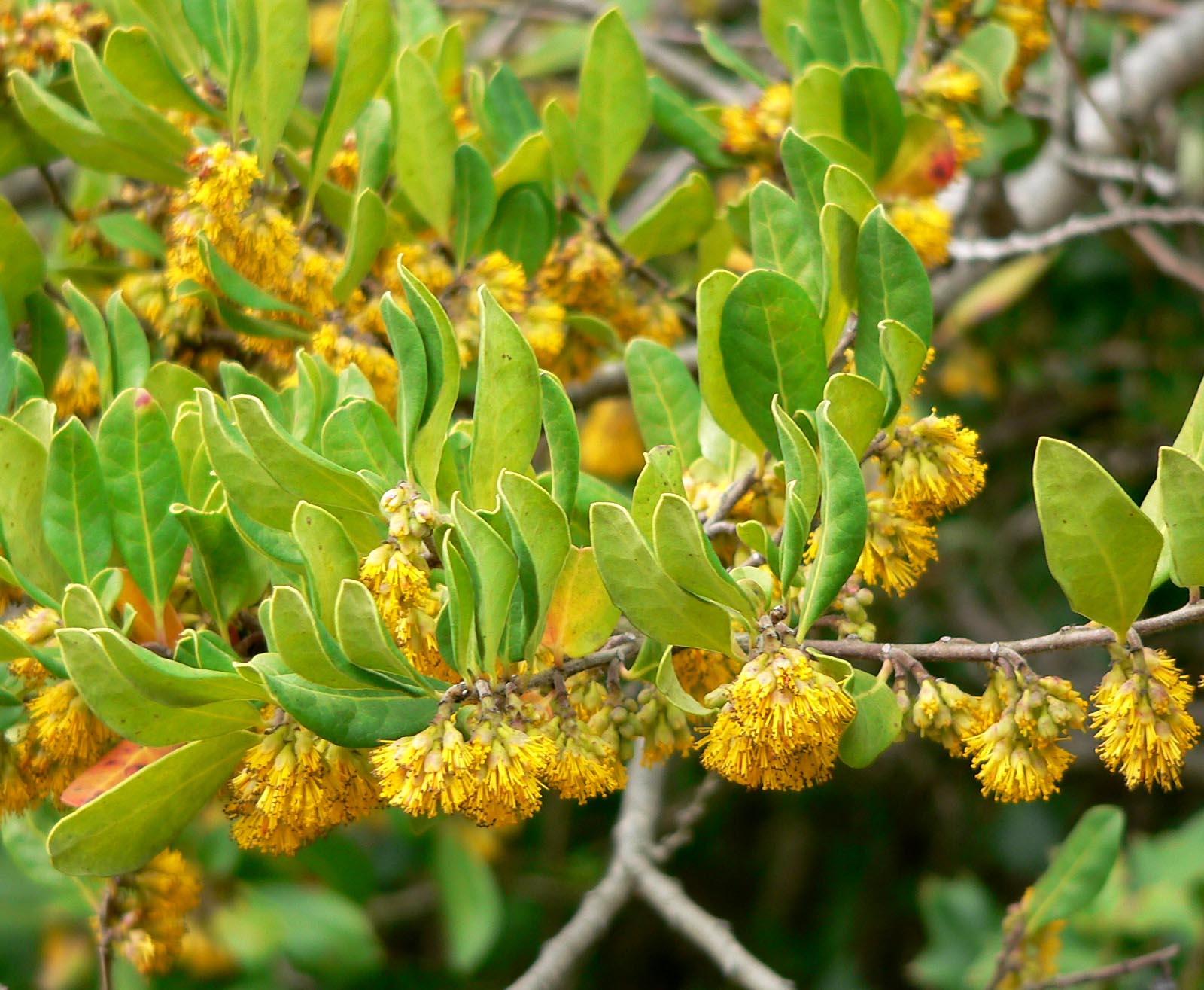
A. petiolaris
