= Euphorbia lactiflua =

Scientific classification
- Kingdom: Plantae
- Clade: Tracheophytes
- Clade: Angiosperms
- Clade: Eudicots
- Clade: Rosids
- Order: Malpighiales
- Family: Euphorbiaceae
- Genus: Euphorbia
- Species: E. lactiflua

Binomial name
- Euphorbia lactiflua Phil.

Species of plant

Euphorbia lactiflua is a species of flowering plant in the family Euphorbiaceae. It is a shrub endemic to Northern Chile, distributed in the Antofagasta and Atacama regions.
