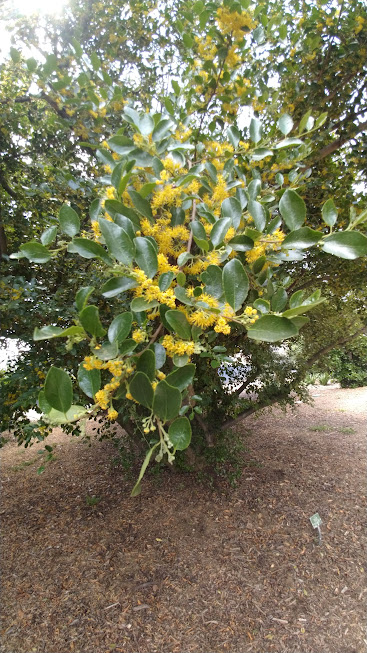

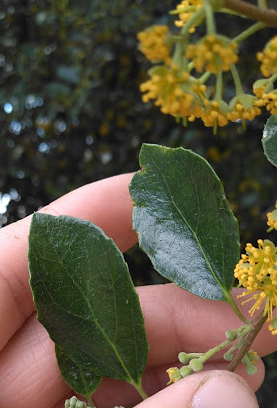

Scientific classification
- Kingdom: Plantae
- Clade: Tracheophytes
- Clade: Angiosperms
- Clade: Eudicots
- Clade: Rosids
- Order: Malpighiales
- Family: Salicaceae
- Genus: Azara
- Species: A. celastrina

Binomial name
- Azara celastrina D.Don

Synonyms
- Azara sparsiflora Steud.; Azara tomentosa Bertero ex Steud.

= Azara celastrina =

Species of tree

Azara celastrina, also known as lilen, is a small tree in the family Salicaceae. It grows to a height of 10 m and it is endemic to Central Chile. The yellow flowers are in an axillary corymb, and the leaves are serrate, oval and alternate, with a length of 4 cm. A. celastrina grows in semi-arid conditions up to 1000 m elevation.
