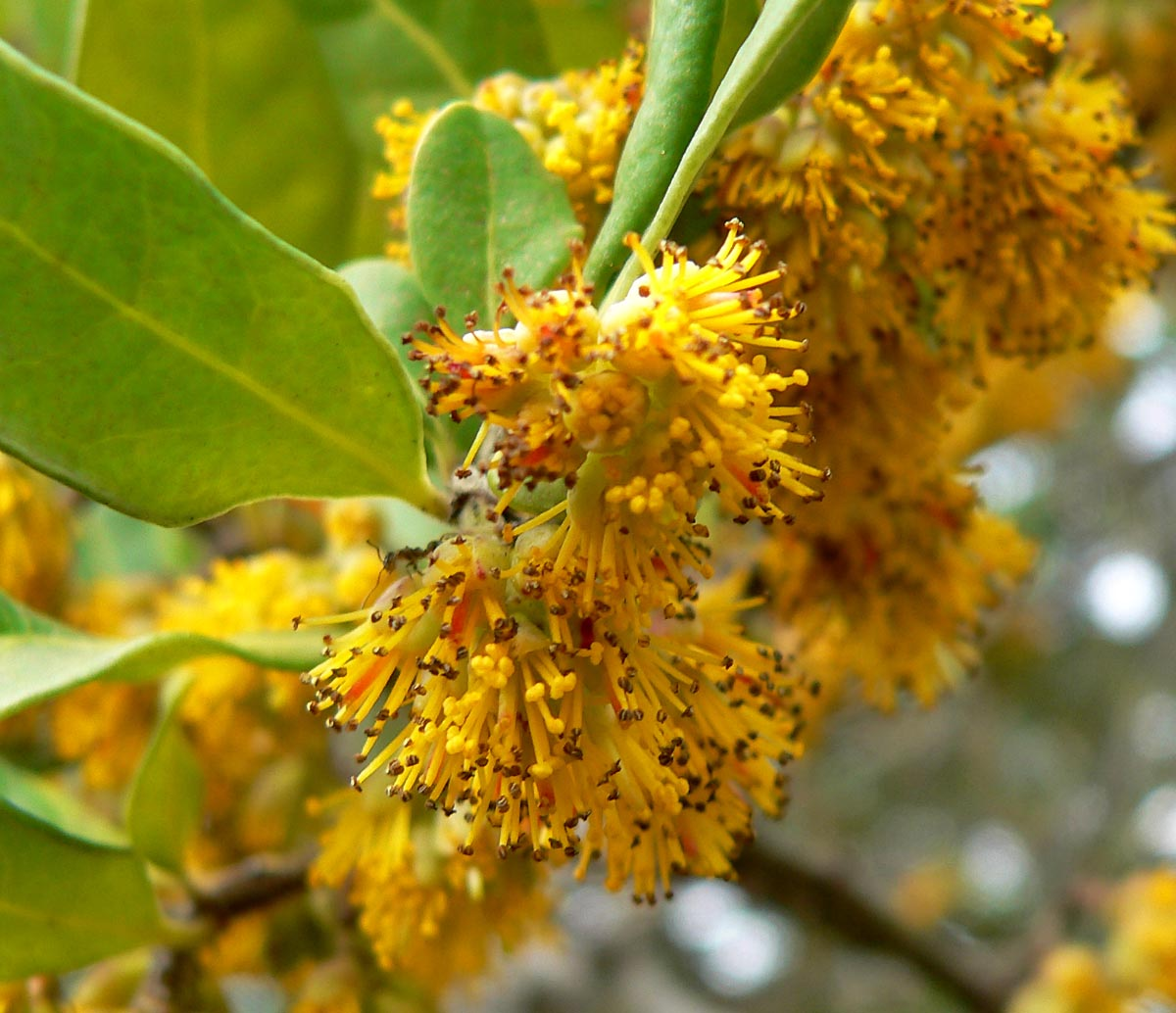

Conservation status
- Least Concern (IUCN 3.1)

Scientific classification
- Kingdom: Plantae
- Clade: Tracheophytes
- Clade: Angiosperms
- Clade: Eudicots
- Clade: Rosids
- Order: Malpighiales
- Family: Salicaceae
- Genus: Azara
- Species: A. petiolaris

Binomial name
- Azara petiolaris (D.Don) I.M.Johnst. (1938)

Synonyms
- Azara crassifolia Dippel (1893); Azara gilliesii Hook. & Arn. (1833); Azara gilliesii var. minor Reiche (1896); Azara lilen Bertero (1829); Quillaja petiolaris D.Don (1831)

= Azara petiolaris =

Species of flowering plant

Azara petiolaris is a species of flowering plant in the family Salicaceae. It is endemic to Central Chile.
