= List of taxa named by Ruiz and Pavón =

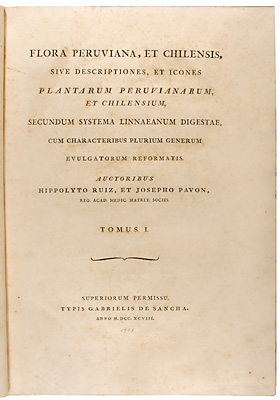
Title page of Flora Peruviana, et Chilensis (1798), by Ruiz & Pavón

Hipólito Ruiz López and José Antonio Pavón Jiménez are jointly cited as the authors of many botanical names. Between 1779 and 1788 these Spanish botanists (together with the French botanist Joseph Dombey) visited Chile, Peru and other South American countries. Their standard author abbreviations are "Ruiz" and "Pav.", so that they are now jointly cited as "Ruiz & Pav." Ruiz y Pavón is the Spanish form of the Latin Ruiz et Pavón; both mean "Ruiz and Pavón".

== Published works ==
Ruiz and Pavón jointly published:

- Ruiz, Hipólito; Pavón, José (1798–1802). Flora Peruviana, et Chilensis, sive, Descriptiones et icones plantarum Peruvianarum, et Chilensium, secundum systema Linnaeanum digestae, cum characteribus plurium generum evulgatorum reformatis V vols. plus plates. Madrid: Typis Gabrielis de Sancha., also at El Real Jardín Botánico, Madrid
  - Volume I, 1798
  - Volume II, 1799
  - Volume III, 1802
  - Volume IV s.d., (plates)
    - Volume IV, (plates and text 1958 edition)
  - Volume V [s.d.], (plates)
- Systema vegetabilium florae peruvianae et chilensis, characteres Prodromi: genericos differentiales, specierum omnium differentias, durationem, loca natalia, tempus florendi, nomina vernacula, vires et usus nonnullis illustrationibus interspersis complectens Volume I (of 1). [Madrid]: Typis Gabrielis de Sancha, 1798.

== Taxa of Ruiz & Pavón ==
Although Ruiz and Pavón named plant genera after one another, Cavanilles was working independently at about the same time and honoured each of them with the genus names Pavonia Cav. (in family Malvaceae), and Ruizia Cav. (in family Sterculiaceae), which were published before their own work. Pavonia Ruiz & Pav. and Ruizia Pav.(in family Monimiaceae) are thus homonyms.

Key : A = species is accepted | S = species is a synonym | U = species is unresolved

- Unless otherwise noted, the reference for information used in this list comes from The Plant List.
- Discrepancies in the sources are indicated by a red asterisk (*) corresponding to a note found
  at the end of the list of the genus in which it appears.

=== Genera (A — E) ===
- Acaena
  - A. argentea Ruiz & Pav. A
  - A. cylindristachya Ruiz & Pav. A
  - A. lappacea Ruiz & Pav. S
    [ = A. elongata L. ] A
  - A. ovalifolia Ruiz & Pav. A
  - A. pinnatifida Ruiz & Pav. A
  - A. trifida Ruiz & Pav. U
- Aextoxicon Ruiz & Pav. (monotypic genus)
  - A. punctatum Ruiz & Pav. A (type)
- Alonsoa
  - A. acutifolia Ruiz & Pav. A
  - A. caulialata Ruiz & Pav. A
  - A. incisifolia Ruiz & Pav. S
    [ = A. meridionalis (L.f.) Kuntze ] A
  - A. incissaefolia Ruiz & Pav. S
    [ = A. meridionalis (L.f.) Kuntze ] A
  - A. linearis (Jacq.) Ruiz & Pav. A
  - A. procumbens Ruiz & Pav. S
    [ = A. meridionalis (L.f.) Kuntze ] A
  - A. unilabiata Ruiz & Pav. ex Steud. S
    [ = Diascia unilabiata (Thunb.) Benth. ] A
- Aloysia
  - A. virgata (Ruiz & Pav.) Juss. A
    A. virgata (Ruiz & Pav.) Pers. ] S (homonym)
    [ = Verbena virgata Ruiz & Pav. ] S (basionym)
- Alstroemeria
  - A. anceps Ruiz & Pav. S (basionym of Bomarea anceps)
    [ = Bomarea anceps (Ruiz & Pav.) Herb. ] A
  - A. bracteata Ruiz & Pav. S (basionym of Bomarea bracteata)
    [ = Bomarea bracteata (Ruiz & Pav.) Herb. ] A
  - A. coccinea Ruiz & Pav. S (basionym of Bomarea coccinea)
    [ = Bomarea coccinea (Ruiz & Pav.) Baker ] A
  - A. cordifolia Ruiz & Pav. S
    [ = Bomarea cordifolia (Ruiz & Pav.) Herb. ] A
  - A. crocea Ruiz & Pav. S (basionym of Bomarea crocea)
    [ = Bomarea crocea (Ruiz & Pav.) Herb. ] A
  - A. denticulata Ruiz & Pav. S (basionym of Bomarea denticulata)
    [ = Bomarea denticulata (Ruiz & Pav.) Herb. ] A
  - A. distichifolia Ruiz & Pav. S (basionym of Bomarea disichifolia, Danbya distichifolia, and Sphaerine distichophylla)
    [ = Bomarea distichifolia (Ruiz & Pav.) Baker ] A
    [ = Danbya distichifolia (Ruiz & Pav.) Salisb. ] S (nom. inval.)
    [ = Sphaerine distichophylla (Ruiz & Pav.) Herb. * ] S
  - A. fimbriata Ruiz & Pav. S
    [ = Bomarea rosea (Ruiz & Pav.) Herb. ] A
  - A. formosissima Ruiz & Pav. S (basionym of Bomarea formosissima)
    [ = Bomarea formosissima (Ruiz & Pav.) Herb. ] A
  - A. haemantha Ruiz & Pav. S
    [ = A. ligtu L. subsp. ligtu ] A
  - A. latifolia Ruiz & Pav. S
    [ = B. latifolia (Ruiz & Pav.) Herb. ] A
  - A. ligtu forma haemantha (Ruiz & Pav.) Ravenna S
    [ = A. ligtu L. subsp. ligtu ] A
  - A. ligtu var. lineatiflora (Ruiz & Pav.) Herb. S
    [ = A. chorillensis Herb. ] A
  - A. lineatiflora Ruiz & Pav. S
    [ = A. chorillensis Herb. ] A
  - A. macrocarpa Ruiz & Pav. S (basionym of Bomarea ovata)
    [ = B. ovata (Cav.) Mirb. ] A
  - A. peregrina Ruiz & Pav. S
    [ = A. pelegrina L. ] A
  - A. purpurea Ruiz & Pav. S (basionym of Bomarea purpurea)
    [ = Bomarea purpurea (Ruiz & Pav.) Herb. ] A
  - A. revoluta Ruiz & Pav. A
  - A. rosea Ruiz & Pav. S (basionym of Bomarea rosea)
    [ = B. fimbriata (Ruiz & Pav.) Herb. ] S
    [ = B. rosea (Ruiz & Pav.) Herb. ] A
  - A. secundifolia Ruiz & Pav. S (basionym of Bomarea secundifolia and Danbya secundifolia)
    [ = Bomarea secundifolia (Ruiz & Pav.) Baker ] A
    [ = Danbya secundifolia (Ruiz & Pav.) Salisb. ] S (nom. inval)
    [ = Sphaerine secundifolia (Ruiz & Pav.) Herb. ] S
  - A. setacea Ruiz & Pav. S (basionym of Bomarea setacea)
    [ = Bomarea setacea (Ruiz & Pav.) Herb. ] A
  - A. tomentosa Ruiz & Pav. S
    [ = B. ovata (Cav.) Mirb. ] A
  - A. versicolor Ruiz & Pav. A

* Note: According to the Plant List entry for Sphaerine distichophylla the binomial authority is '(Spreng.) Herb.'; while the Tropicos entry for the same is given as '(Ruiz & Pav.) Herb.'

- Azara Ruiz & Pav.
  - A. dentata Ruiz & Pav. A
  - A. integrifolia Ruiz & Pav. A
  - A. serrata Ruiz & Pav. U (lectotype)
- Baccharis
  - B. caespitosa (Ruiz & Pav.) Pers. A
  - B. concava (Ruiz & Pav.) Pers. A
  - B. corymbosa (Ruiz & Pav.) Pers. A
  - B. emarginata (Ruiz & Pav.) Pers. A
  - B. genistelloides (Lam.) Pers. subsp. venosa (Ruiz & Pav.) Cuatrec. S
    [ = B. genistelloides (Lam.) Pers. subsp. genistelloides ] A
  - B. latifolia (Ruiz & Pav.) Pers. A
  - B. linearis (Ruiz & Pav.) Pers. A
  - B. nitida (Ruiz & Pav.) Pers. A
  - B. oblongifolia (Ruiz & Pav.) Pers. A
  - B. obovata (Ruiz & Pav.) DC. (nom. illeg.) S
    [ = B. chilco Kunth ] A
  - B. parviflora Ruiz & Pav. S
    [ = B. salicifolia (Ruiz & Pav.) Pers. A
  - B. parviflora (Ruiz & Pav.) Pers. S
    [ = B. salicifolia (Ruiz & Pav.) Pers. A
  - B. prostrata Ruiz & Pav. (nom. illeg.) S
    [ = B. linearifolia (Lam.) Pers. ] A
  - B. prostrata (Ruiz & Pav.) Pers. S
    [ = B. linearifolia (Lam.) Pers. ] A
  - B. racemosa (Ruiz & Pav.) DC. A
  - B. reticulata (Ruiz & Pav.) Pers. S
    [ = B. genistelloides (Lam.) Pers. ] A
  - B. salicifolia (Ruiz & Pav.) Pers. A
  - B. scabra (Ruiz & Pav.) Pers. A
  - B. scandens (Ruiz & Pav.) Pers. A
  - B. serrulata var. linearis (Ruiz & Pav.) Kuntze S
    [ = Baccharis pingraea DC. var. pingraea ] A
  - B. striata Ruiz & Pav. S
    [ = B. salicifolia (Ruiz & Pav.) Pers. ] A
  - B. tomentosa (Ruiz & Pav.) Pers. A
  - B. uniflora (Ruiz & Pav.) Pers. A
  - B. venosa (Ruiz & Pav.) Pers. A
  - B. viscosa (Ruiz & Pav.) Kuntze (nom. illeg.) S
    [ = B. glutinosa Pers. ] A
- Baitaria Ruiz & Pav.
  [ probably = Calandrinia Kunth ]
  - B. acaulis Ruiz & Pav. S (type)
    [ = Calandrinia carolinii Hershk. & D.I.Ford ] A
- Bomarea
  - B. anceps (Ruiz & Pav.) Herb. A
    [ = Alstroemeria anceps Ruiz & Pav. ] S (basionym)
  - B. bracteata (Ruiz & Pav.) Herb. A
    [ = Alstroemeria bracteata Ruiz & Pav. ] S (basionym)
  - B. coccinea (Ruiz & Pav.) Baker A
    [ = Alstroemeria coccinea Ruiz & Pav. ] S (basionym)
    [ = Sphaerine coccinea (Ruiz & Pav.) Herb. ] S
  - B. cordifolia (Ruiz & Pav.) Herb. A
    [ = Alstroemeria cordifolia Ruiz & Pav. ] S
  - B. crocea (Ruiz & Pav.) Herb. A
    [ = Alstroemeria crocea Ruiz & Pav. ] S (basionym)
  - B. denticulata (Ruiz & Pav.) Herb. A
    [ = Alstroemeria denticulata Ruiz & Pav. ] S (basionym)
  - B. distichifolia (Ruiz & Pav.) Baker A
    [ = Alstroemeria distichifolia Ruiz & Pav. ] S (basionym)
    [ = Danbya distichifolia (Ruiz & Pav.) Salisb. ] S (nom. inval.)
    [ = Sphaerine distichophylla (Ruiz & Pav.) Herb.* ] S
  - B. fimbriata (Ruiz & Pav.) Herb. ] S
    [ = Alstroemeria rosea Ruiz & Pav. ] S
    [ = B. rosea (Ruiz & Pav.) Herb. ] A
  - B. formosissima (Ruiz & Pav.) Herb. A
    [ = Alstroemeria formosissima Ruiz & Pav. ] S (basionym)
  - B. latifolia (Ruiz & Pav.) Herb. A
    [ = Alstroemeria latifolia Ruiz & Pav. ] S
  - B. macrocarpa (Ruiz & Pav.) Herb. S
    [ = Alstroemeria tomentosa Ruiz & Pav. ] S (basionym)
    [ = B. ovata (Cav.) Mirb. ] A
    [ = B. tomentosa (Ruiz & Pav.) Herb. ] S
  - B. purpurea (Ruiz & Pav.) Herb. A
    [ = Alstroemeria purpurea Ruiz & Pav. ] S (basionym)
  - B. rosea (Ruiz & Pav.) Herb. A
    [ = Alstroemeria rosea Ruiz & Pav. ] S (basionym)
    [ = B. fimbriata (Ruiz & Pav.) Herb. ] S
  - B. secundifolia (Ruiz & Pav.) Baker A
    [ = Alstroemeria secundifolia Ruiz & Pav. ] S (basionym)
    [ = Danbya secundifolia (Ruiz & Pav.) Salisb. ] S (nom. inval)
    [ = Sphaerine secundifolia (Ruiz & Pav.) Herb. ] S
  - B. setacea (Ruiz & Pav.) Herb. A
    [ = Alstroemeria setacea Ruiz & Pav. ] S (basionym)
  - B. tomentosa (Ruiz & Pav.) Herb. S
    [ = B. ovata (Cav.) Mirb. ] A

* Note: According to the Plant List entry for Sphaerine distichophylla the binomial authority is '(Spreng.) Herb.'; while the Tropicos entry for the same is given as '(Ruiz & Pav.) Herb.'

- Bulbostylis
  - Bulbostylis striata (Ruiz & Pav.) H.Pfeiff. A
- Calceolaria
  - C. alba Ruiz & Pav. A
  - C. angustiflora Ruiz & Pav. A
  - C. bicolor Ruiz & Pav. A
  - C. bicrenata Ruiz & Pav. A
  - C. biflora Ruiz & Pav. (nom. illeg.) S
    [ = C. dichotoma Lam. ] A
  - C. corymbosa Ruiz & Pav. A
  - C. cuneiformis Ruiz & Pav. A
  - C. deflexa Ruiz & Pav. A
  - C. dentata Ruiz & Pav. A
  - C. flexuosa Ruiz & Pav. A
  - C. glauca Ruiz & Pav. A
  - C. heterophylla Ruiz & Pav. A
  - C. inflexa Ruiz & Pav. A
  - C. involuta Ruiz & Pav. A
  - C. involuta Ruiz & Pav. A
  - C. oblonga Ruiz & Pav. A
  - C. perfoliata Ruiz & Pav. (nom. illeg.) S
    [ = C. pavonii Benth. ] A
  - C. pinnata Ruiz & Pav. (nom. illeg.) S
    [ = C. tripartita Ruiz & Pav. ] A
  - C. pulverulenta Ruiz & Pav. A
  - C. puncticulata (Ruiz & Pav.) Phil. U
  - C. punicea Ruiz & Pav. A
  - C. rugosa Ruiz & Pav. S
    [ = C. integrifolia L. ] A
  - C. salicifolia Ruiz & Pav. A
  - C. scabra Ruiz & Pav. A
  - C. scapiflora (Ruiz & Pav.) Benth. A
  - C. sessilis Ruiz & Pav. A
  - C. tomentosa Ruiz & Pav. A
  - C. trifida Ruiz & Pav. S
    [ = C. bicolor Ruiz & Pav. ] A
  - C. tripartita Ruiz & Pav. A
  - C. uniflora Ruiz & Pav. (nom. illeg.) S
    [ = C. virgata Ruiz & Pav. ] A
  - C. verticillata Ruiz & Pav. A
  - C. virgata Ruiz & Pav. A
  - C. viscosa Ruiz & Pav. A
- Cantua
  - C. flexuosa (Ruiz & Pav.) Pers. A
    [ = Periphragmos flexuosus Ruiz & Pav. ] S (basionym)
  - C. foetida (Ruiz & Pav.) Cav. U
    [ Possibly = Periphragmos foetidus Ruiz & Pav. ] U
- Capsicum
  - C. pubescens Ruiz & Pav. A
  - C. punctatum (Ruiz & Pav.) Kuntze S
    [ = Saracha punctata Ruiz & Pav. ] A
- Chaetanthera Ruiz & Pav.
  - C. ciliata Ruiz & Pav. A (lectotype)
  - C. serrata auct. non Ruiz & Pav. S
    [ = C. chilensis (Willd.) DC. ] A
  - C. serrata Ruiz & Pav. A
- Cinchona
  - C. acuminata (Ruiz & Pav.) Poir. ex Lam. S
    [ = Hillia parasitica Jacq. ] A
  - C. acutifolia Ruiz & Pav. S
    [ = Ladenbergia acutifolia (Ruiz & Pav.) Klotzsch ] A
  - C. condaminea Bonpl. var. lanceolata (Ruiz & Pav.) Lamb. S
    [ = C. lanceolata Ruiz & Pav. ] A
  - C. corymbosa (Ruiz & Pav.) Brign. (nom. illeg.) S
    [ = Exostema corymbosum (Ruiz & Pav.) Spreng. ] A
  - C. dichotoma Ruiz & Pav. S
    [ = Joosia dichotoma (Ruiz & Pav.) H.Karst. ] A
  - C. glandulifera Ruiz & Pav. A
  - C. glandulosa Ruiz & Pav. ex Triana S
    [ = C. glandulifera Ruiz & Pav. ] A
  - C. glomerata Ruiz & Pav. U
  - C. grandiflora Ruiz & Pav. S
    [ = Cosmibuena grandiflora (Ruiz & Pav.) Rusby ] A
  - C. grandifolia Ruiz & Pav. ex Poir. S
    [ = Ladenbergia oblongifolia (Humb. ex Mutis) L.Andersson ] A
  - C. hirsuta Ruiz & Pav. A
  - C. laccifera Ruiz & Pav. ex Fée (nom. inval.) S
    [ = Simira rubescens (Benth.) Bremek. ex Steyerm. ] A
  - C. lanceolata Ruiz & Pav. U
  - C. lancifolia Mutis var. nitida (Ruiz & Pav.) Schult. S
    [ = C. nitida Ruiz & Pav. ] A
  - C. magnifolia Ruiz & Pav. S
    [ = Ladenbergia oblongifolia (Humb. ex Mutis) L.Andersson ] A
  - C. micrantha Ruiz & Pav. A
  - C. nitida Ruiz & Pav. A
  - C. oblongifolia Ruiz & Pav. S
    [ = Ladenbergia oblongifolia (Humb. ex Mutis) L.Andersson ] A
  - C. obtusifolia Ruiz & Pav. S
    [ = Cosmibuena grandiflora (Ruiz & Pav.) Rusby ] A
  - C. ovata Ruiz & Pav. S
    [ = C. pubescens Vahl ] A
  - C. pallescens Ruiz ex DC. var. ovata (Ruiz & Pav.) Howard S
    [ = C. pubescens Vahl ] A
  - C. peruviana Howard var. micrantha (Ruiz & Pav.) Howard S
    [ = C. micrantha Ruiz & Pav. ] A
  - C. peruviana Howard var. nitida (Ruiz & Pav.) Howard S
    [ = C. nitida Ruiz & Pav. ] A
  - C. pubescens Vahl var. hirsuta (Ruiz & Pav.) DC. S
    [ = C. hirsuta Ruiz & Pav. ] A
  - C. pubescens Vahl var. ovata (Ruiz & Pav.) DC. S
    [ = C. pubescens Vahl. ] A
  - C. pubescens Vahl var. purpurea (Ruiz & Pav.) Wedd. S
    [ = C. pubescens Vahl. ] A
  - C. purpurea Ruiz & Pav. S
    [ = C. pubescens Vahl ] A
  - C. rosea Ruiz & Pav. S
    [ = Macrocnemum roseum (Ruiz & Pav.) Wedd. ] A
- Cistanthe
  - C. lingulata (Ruiz & Pav.) Hershk. A
  - C. paniculata (Ruiz & Pav.) Carolin ex Hershk. A
- Citronella
  - C. mucronata (Ruiz & Pav.) D.Don A
- Clinopodium
  - C. multiflorum (Ruiz & Pav.) Kuntze A
    [ = Gardoquia multiflora Ruiz & Pav. S ] (basionym)
    [ = Satureja multiflora (Ruiz & Pav.) Briq. S ]
  - C. obovatum (Ruiz & Pav.) Govaerts A
    [ = Gardoquia obovata Ruiz & Pav. ] S (basionym)
    [ = Satureja obovata (Ruiz & Pav.) Briq. S ]
  - C. revolutum (Ruiz & Pav.) Govaerts A
    [ = Gardoquia revoluta Ruiz & Pav. ] S (basionym)
    [ = Satureja revoluta (Ruiz & Pav.) Briq. S ]
  - C. striatum (Ruiz & Pav.) Govaerts A
    [ = Gardoquia striata Ruiz & Pav. S ] (basionym)
    [ = Satureja striata (Ruiz & Pav.) Briq. S ]
- Collomia
  - C. biflora (Ruiz & Pav.) Brand A
- Columellia Ruiz & Pav. (named for Columella, a Roman agricultural writer)
  - C. oblonga Ruiz & Pav. A (type)
  - C. obovata Ruiz & Pav. A
- Conanthera Ruiz & Pav.
  - C. bifolia Ruiz & Pav. A (type)
- Condaminea
  - C. corymbosa (Ruiz & Pav.) DC. A (lectotype)
  - C. microcarpa (Ruiz & Pav.) DC. A
  - C. venosa (Ruiz & Pav.) DC. A
- Cosmibuena Ruiz & Pav.
  - C. acuminata Ruiz & Pav. S
    [ = Hillia parasitica Jacq. ] A
  - C. grandiflora (Ruiz & Pav.) Rusby A
  - C. obtusifolia Ruiz & Pav. S (type)
    [ = C. grandiflora (Ruiz & Pav.) Rusby A ]
- Cremastosperma
  - C. pendulum (Ruiz & Pav.) R.E.Fr. A
- Cuscuta
  - C. corymbosa Ruiz & Pav. U
  - C. croymbosa Ruiz & Pav. A
  - C. odorata Ruiz & Pav. A
- Cyperus
  - C. niger Ruiz & Pav. S
    [ = Pycreus niger (Ruiz & Pav.) Cufod. ] A
  - C. striatus Ruiz & Pav. S
    [ = Bulbostylis striata (Ruiz & Pav.) H.Pfeiff. ] A
- Cyphomandra
  - C. obliqua (Ruiz & Pav.) Sendtn. U
    [ = Pionandra obliqua (Ruiz & Pav.) Miers ] S
    [ = Solanum obliquum Ruiz & Pav. ] S (basionym)
  - C. pendula (Ruiz & Pav.) Sendtn. U
    [ = Pionandra pendula (Ruiz & Pav.) Miers ] S
    [ = Solanum pendulum Ruiz & Pav. ] S (basionym)
  - C. viridiflora (Ruiz & Pav.) Sendtn. U
    [ = Pionandra viridiflora (Ruiz & Pav.) Miers ] S
    [ poss. = Solanum viridiflorum Ruiz & Pav.* ] S ] (basionym)

* Note: According to Tropicos, Solanum viridiflorum is the basionym of Cyphomandra viridiflora, and its synonym (see here); on The Plant List entry for Cyphomandra viridiflora, S. viridiflorum is not included as a synonym (Retrieved February 8, 2012)

- Cyrtidiorchis
  - C. alata (Ruiz & Pav.) Rauschert A
- Cyrtochilum
  - C. hastatum (Ruiz & Pav.) Dalström A
  - C. ligulatum (Ruiz & Pav.) Mansf. ex Dalström A
- Cyrtopodium
  - C. paniculatum (Ruiz & Pav.) Garay A
- Danbya
  - D. distichifolia (Ruiz & Pav.) Salisb. S (lectotype) (nom. inval.)
    [ = Alstroemeria distichifolia Ruiz & Pav. ] S (basionym)
    [ = Bomarea distichifolia (Ruiz & Pav.) Baker ] A
    [ = Sphaerine distichophylla (Ruiz & Pav.) Herb.* ] S
  - D. secundifolia (Ruiz & Pav.) Salisb. S (nom. inval.)
    [ = Alstroemeria secundifolia Ruiz & Pav. ] S (basionym)
    [ = Bomarea secundifolia (Ruiz & Pav.) Baker ] A
    [ = Sphaerine secundifolia (Ruiz & Pav.) Herb. ] S

* Note: According to the Plant List entry for Sphaerine distichophylla the binomial authority is '(Spreng.) Herb.'; while the Tropicos entry for the same is given as '(Ruiz & Pav.) Herb.'

- Desfontainia Ruiz & Pav.
  - D. spinosa Ruiz & Pav. A (type)
- Embothrium
  - E. coccineum J.R.Forst. & G.Forst. var. lanceolatum (Ruiz & Pav.) Kuntze S
    [ = E. coccineum J.R.Forst. & G.Forst ] A
  - E. coccineum J.R.Forst. & G.Forst forma lanceolatum (Ruiz & Pav.) Pérez-Mor. S
    [ = E. coccineum J.R.Forst. & G.Forst ] A
  - E. dentatum Ruiz & Pav. S (basionym)
    [ = Lomatia dentata (Ruiz & Pav.) R.Br.* ] A
  - E. emarginatum Ruiz & Pav. U
  - E. lanceolatum Ruiz & Pav. S
    [ = E. coccineum J.R.Forst. & G.Forst. ] A
  - E. monospermum Ruiz & Pav. S
    [ = Roupala monosperma (Ruiz & Pav.) I.M.Johnst. ] A
  - E. obliguum Ruiz & Pav. U
  - E. obliquum Ruiz & Pav. S
    [ = Lomatia hirsuta (Lam.) Diels subsp. obliqua (Ruiz & Pav.) R.T.Penn. ] A
  - E. pinnatum Ruiz & Pav. U

* Note: according to The Plant List entry for Lomatia dentata the binomial authority is simply 'R.Br.', while the GRIN entry for L. dentata shows '(Ruiz & Pav.) R.Br.' (Retrieved February 1, 2012)

- Epilobium
  - E. denticulatum Ruiz & Pav. A
- Escallonia
  - E. corymbosa (Ruiz & Pav.) Pers. S
    [ = E. myrtilloides L.f. ] A
  - E. cuneifolia (Ruiz & Pav.) Schult. S
    [ = E. resinosa (Ruiz & Pav.) Pers. ] A
  - E. myrtilloides L.f. var. patens (Ruiz & Pav.) Sleumer A
  - E. paniculata (Ruiz & Pav.) Schult. A
  - E. patens (Ruiz & Pav.) Killip S
    [ = E. myrtilloides L.f. var. patens (Ruiz & Pav.) Sleumer ] A
  - E. pendula (Ruiz & Pav.) Pers. A
  - E. pulverulenta (Ruiz & Pav.) Pers. A
  - E. resinosa (Ruiz & Pav.) Pers. A
  - E. revoluta (Ruiz & Pav.) Pers. A
  - E. rubra (Ruiz & Pav.) Pers. A
  - E. virgata (Ruiz & Pav.) Pers. A
- Exostema
  - E. corymbosum (Ruiz & Pav.) Spreng. A

=== Genera (F — J) ===
- Fabiana Ruiz & Pav.
  - F. imbricata Ruiz & Pav. A (type)
- Fuchsia
  - F. apetala Ruiz & Pav. A
  - F. coccinea Aiton var. macrostema (Ruiz & Pav.) Hook. S
    [ = F. magellanica Lam. ] A
  - F. coccinea Aiton var. macrostemma (Ruiz & Pav.) Hook.f.] S
    [ = F. magellanica Lam. ] A
  - F. corymbiflora Ruiz & Pav. A
  - F. decussata Ruiz & Pav. A
  - F. denticulata Ruiz & Pav. A
  - F. gracilis Lindl. var. macrostemma (Ruiz & Pav.) Lindl. S
    [ = F. magellanica Lam. ] A
  - F. grandiflora Ruiz & Pav. U
  - F. macrostemma Ruiz & Pav. S
    [ = F. magellanica Lam. ] A
  - F. magellanica Lam. var. macrostemma (Ruiz & Pav.) Munz S
    [ = F. magellanica Lam. ] A
  - F. ovalis Ruiz & Pav. A
  - F. rosea Ruiz & Pav. S
    [ = F. lycioides Andrews ] A
  - F. serratifolia Ruiz & Pav. S
    [ = F. denticulata Ruiz & Pav. ] A
  - F. simplicicaulis Ruiz & Pav. A
- Gardoquia Ruiz & Pav.
  [ probably = Clinopodium L. ]
  - G. elliptica Ruiz & Pav. S (basionym of Satureja elliptica)
    [ = Clinopodium speciosum (Hook.) Govaerts ] A
    [ = Satureja elliptica (Ruiz & Pav.) Briq. ] S
  - G. incana Ruiz & Pav. S (basionym of Satureja incana)
    [ = Clinopodium breviflorum (Benth.) Govaerts ] A
    [ = Satureja incana (Ruiz & Pav.) Spreng. ] S
  - G. multiflora Ruiz & Pav. S (lectotype, basionym of Clinopodium multiflorum and Satureja multiflora)
    [ = Clinopodium multiflorum (Ruiz & Pav.) Kuntze A
    [ = Satureja multiflora (Ruiz & Pav.) Briq. ] S
  - G. obovata Ruiz & Pav. S (basionym of Clinopodium obovatum and Satureja obovata)
    [ = Clinopodium obovatum (Ruiz & Pav.) Govaerts ] A
    [ = Satureja obovata (Ruiz & Pav.) Briq. ] S
  - G. revoluta Ruiz & Pav. S (basionym of Clinopodium revolutum and Satureja revoluta)
    [ = Clinopodium revolutum (Ruiz & Pav.) Govaerts ] A
    [ = Satureja revoluta (Ruiz & Pav.) Briq. S ]
  - G. striata Ruiz & Pav. S (basionym of Clinopodium striatum and Satureja striata)
    [ = Clinopodium striatum (Ruiz & Pav.) Govaerts ] A
    [ = Satureja striata (Ruiz & Pav.) Briq. ] S
- Gilia Ruiz & Pav.
  - G. biflora (Ruiz & Pav.) J.F.Macbr. S
    [ = Collomia biflora (Ruiz & Pav.) Brand A ]
  - G. involucrata (Ruíz & Pav.) Endl. U
  - G. laciniata Ruiz & Pav. A (type)
- Glandularia
  - G. clavata (Ruiz & Pav.) Botta A
    [ = Verbena clavata Ruiz & Pav. ] S (basionym)
  - G. corymbosa (Ruiz & Pav.) N.O'Leary & P.Peralta A
    [ = Verbena corymbosa Ruiz & Pav. ] S (basionym)
    [ = Zappania corymbosa (Ruiz & Pav.) Poir. ] S
  - G. cuneifolia (Ruiz & Pav.) Binder S
    [ = Verbena cuneifolia Ruiz & Pav. ] A (basionym)
- Gomortega Ruiz & Pav.
  - G. nitida Ruiz & Pav. S (type)
    [ = G. keule (Molina) Baill. ] A
- Guatteria Ruiz & Pav.
  - G. decandra Ruiz & Pav. ex G.Don A
  - G. decandra Ruiz & Pav. U
  - G. glauca Ruiz & Pav. A
  - G. hirsuta Ruiz & Pav. A
  - G. magnifica Ruiz & Pav. ex G.Don U
  - G. microcarpa Ruiz & Pav. ex G.Don A
  - G. microcarpa Ruiz & Pav. ex E.A.López S
    [ = G. microcarpa Ruiz & Pav. ex G.Don ] A
  - G. ovalis Ruiz & Pav. U
  - G. pendula Ruiz & Pav. S
    [ = Cremastosperma pendulum (Ruiz & Pav.) R.E.Fr. ] A
- Jaltomata
  - J. aspera (Ruiz & Pav.) Mione & F.G.Coe A
  - J. bicolor (Ruiz & Pav.) Mione A
  - J. biflora (Ruiz & Pav.) Benítez A
    [ = Saracha biflora Ruiz & Pav. ] S (basionym)
  - J. contorta (Ruiz & Pav.) Mione A
  - J. dentata (Ruiz & Pav.) Benítez A
    [ = Saracha dentata Ruiz & Pav. ] S (basionym)
  - J. umbellata (Ruiz & Pav.) Mione & M.Nee A
- Jarava Ruiz & Pav.
  - J. ichu Ruiz & Pav. S (type, basionym of Stipa ichu)
    [ = Stipa ichu (Ruiz & Pav) Kunth ] A
- Joosia
  - J. dichotoma (Ruiz & Pav.) H.Karst. A
- Jovellana Ruiz & Pav.
  - J. punctata Ruiz & Pav. A
  - J. scapiflora Ruiz & Pav. S
    [ = Calceolaria scapiflora (Ruiz & Pav.) Benth. ] A

=== Genera (K — O) ===
- Kageneckia Ruiz & Pav.
  - K. lanceolata Ruiz & Pav. A
  - K. oblonga Ruiz & Pav. A (type)
- Krameria
  - K. pentapetala Ruiz & Pav. S
    [ = K. lappacea (Dombey) Burdet & B.B.Simpson ] A
  - K. triandra Ruiz & Pav. S
    [ = K. lappacea (Dombey) Burdet & B.B.Simpson ] A
- Ladenbergia
  - L. acutifolia (Ruiz & Pav.) Klotzsch A
  - L. dichotoma (Ruiz & Pav.) Klotzsch S
    [ = Joosia dichotoma (Ruiz & Pav.) H.Karst. ] A
  - L. magnifolia (Ruiz & Pav.) Klotzsch S
    [ = L. oblongifolia (Humb. ex Mutis) L.Andersson ] A
- Lapageria Ruiz & Pav.
  - L. rosea Ruiz & Pav. A (type)
- Lardizabala Ruiz & Pav.
  - L. biternata Ruiz & Pav. A (lectotype)
  - L. trifoliata Ruiz & Pav. U
  - L. triternata Ruiz & Pav. U
- Laurelia
  - L. sempervirens (Ruiz & Pav.) Tul.* A
    [ = Pavonia sempervirens Ruiz & Pav. ] S (basionym)

* Note: The Plant List entry for Laurelia sempervirens gives the binomial authority as simply 'Tul.', while the Tropicos entry for L. sempervirens shows '(Ruiz & Pav.) Tul.' (Retrieved February 1, 2012)

- Lomatia
  - L. dentata (Ruiz & Pav.) R.Br.* A
    [ = Embothrium dentatum Ruiz & Pav. (basionym) ] S
    [ = Tricondylus dentatus (Ruiz & Pav.) Kuntze ] S
  - L. hirsuta (Lam.) Diels subsp. obliqua (Ruiz & Pav.) R.T.Penn. A
  - L. obliqua (Ruiz & Pav.) R.Br. A

* Note: according to The Plant List entry for Lomatia dentata the binomial authority is simply 'R.Br.', while the GRIN entry for L. dentata shows '(Ruiz & Pav.) R.Br.' (Retrieved February 1, 2012)

- Luzuriaga Ruiz & Pav.
  - L. radicans Ruiz & Pav. A (type)
- Lycianthes
  - L. acutifolia (Ruiz & Pav.) Bitter A
    [ = Solanum acutifolium Ruiz & Pav. ] S (basionym)
  - L. biformifolia (Ruiz & Pav.) Bitter A
    [ = Solanum biformifolium Ruiz & Pav. ] S (basionym)
  - L. glandulosa (Ruiz & Pav.) Bitter A
    [ = Solanum glandulosum Ruiz & Pav. ] S (basionym)
  - L. lineata (Ruiz & Pav.) Bitter A
    [ = Solanum lineatum Ruiz & Pav. ] S (basionym)
- Macrocnemum
  - M. corymbosum Ruiz & Pav. S
    [ = Condaminea corymbosa (Ruiz & Pav.) DC. ] A
  - M. microcarpum Ruiz & Pav. S
    [ = C. microcarpa (Ruiz & Pav.) DC. ] A
  - M. roseum (Ruiz & Pav.) Wedd. A
  - M. venosum Ruiz & Pav. S
    [ = C. venosa (Ruiz & Pav.) DC. ] A
- Margyricarpus Ruiz & Pav.
  - M. setosus Ruiz & Pav. S (type)
    [ = M. pinnatus (Lam.) Kuntze ] A
- Masdevallia Ruiz & Pav.
  - M. uniflora Ruiz & Pav. A (type)
- Maxillaria Ruiz & Pav.
  - M. alata Ruiz & Pav. S
    [ = Xylobium alatum (Ruiz & Pav.) Mend.-Tinc., Molinari & Carpio ] A
  - M. bicolor Ruiz & Pav. S
    [ = Xylobium bicolor Molinari, Carpio & Mend.-Tinc. ] A
  - M. ciliata Ruiz & Pav. S
    [ = Sudamerlycaste ciliata (Ruiz & Pav.) Archila ] A
  - M. cuneiformis Ruiz & Pav. S
    [ = Xylobium cuneiforme (Ruiz & Pav.) Carpio, Mend.-Tinc. & Molinari ] A
  - M. haemathodes (Ruiz & Pav.) Garay S
    [ = Ornithidium haemathodes (Garay) M.A.Blanco & Ojeda ] A
  - M. hastata Ruiz & Pav. S
    [ = Cyrtochilum hastatum (Ruiz & Pav.) Dalström ] A
  - M. ligulata Ruiz & Pav. S
    [ = Cyrtochilum ligulatum (Ruiz & Pav.) Mansf. ex Dalström ] A
  - M. longipetala Ruiz & Pav. A
  - M. paniculata Ruiz & Pav. S
    [ = Cyrtopodium paniculatum (Ruiz & Pav.) Garay ] A
  - M. platypetala Ruiz & Pav. A (lectotype)
  - M. prolifera Ruiz & Pav. A
  - M. ramosa Ruiz & Pav. A
  - M. tricolor Ruiz & Pav. A
  - M. triphylla Ruiz & Pav. A
  - M. undatiflora Ruiz & Pav. A
  - M. undulata Ruiz & Pav. S
    [ = Xylobium undulatum (Ruiz & Pav.) Rolfe ] A
  - M. variegata Ruiz & Pav. S
    [ = Xylobium variegatum (Ruiz & Pav.) Garay & Dunst. ] A
- Monnina Ruiz & Pav.
  - M. conferta Ruiz & Pav. A
  - M. denticulata Ruiz & Pav. ex Chodat A
  - M. linearifolia Ruiz & Pav. A
  - M. macrostachya Ruiz & Pav. A
  - M. polystachya Ruiz & Pav. A (lectotype)
  - M. pterocarpa Ruiz & Pav. S
    [ = Pteromonnina pterocarpa (Ruiz & Pav.) B.Eriksen ] A
  - M. salicifolia Ruiz & Pav. A
- Monocosmia
  - M. monandra (Ruiz & Pav.) Baill. S
    [ = Calandrinia monandra Hershk. ] A
- Montiopsis
  - M. umbellata (Ruiz & Pav.) D.I.Ford A
    [ = Talinum umbellatum Ruiz & Pav. ] S (basionym)
- Moscharia Ruiz & Pav. (nom. cons.)
  - M. pinnatifida Ruiz & Pav. A
- Mutisia
  - M. acuminata Ruiz & Pav. A
  - M. lanata Ruiz & Pav. U
  - M. spinosa Ruiz & Pav. A
  - M. subulata Ruiz & Pav. S
    [ = M. s. forma subulata ] U (autonym)
  - M. subulata var. rosea (Less.) Ruiz & Pav. S
    [ = M. rosea Poepp. ex Less. ] A
- Myoschilos Ruiz & Pav.
  - M. oblongum Ruiz & Pav. A (type)
- Nama
  - N. dichotomum (Ruiz & Pav.) Choisy A
- Navarretia Ruiz & Pav.
  - N. involucrata Ruiz & Pav. A (type)

=== Genera (P — T) ===
- Pavonia
  - P. sempervirens Ruiz & Pav. S (basionym of Laurelia sempervirens)
    [ = Laurelia sempervirens (Ruiz & Pav.) Tul.* ] A

* Note: The Plant List entry for Laurelia sempervirens gives the binomial authority as simply 'Tul.', while the Tropicos entry for L. sempervirens shows '(Ruiz & Pav.) Tul.' (Retrieved February 1, 2012)

- Periphragmos Ruiz & Pav.
  [ = Cantua J.Juss. ex Lam. ]
  - P. dependens Ruiz & Pav. S
    [ = Cantua buxifolia Juss. ex Lam. ] A
    [ = P. uniflorus Ruiz & Pav. ] S
  - P. flexuosus Ruiz & Pav. S (lectotype)
    [ = Cantua flexuosa (Ruiz & Pav.) Pers. ] A
  - P. foetidus Ruiz & Pav. U (basionym of Vestia foetida)
    [ Possibly = Cantua foetida (Ruiz & Pav.) Cav. ] U
    [ = Vestia foetida (Ruiz & Pav.) Hoffmanns.* ] A
  - P. uniflorus Ruiz & Pav. S
    [ = Cantua buxifolia Juss. ex Lam. ] A
    [ = P. dependens Ruiz & Pav. ] S

* Note: According to the Plant List entry for Vestia foetida the binomial authority is shown as simply 'Hoffmanns.'; while the GRIN entry for the same is given as '(Ruiz & Pav.) Hoffmanns.'

- Phthirusa
  - P. retroflexa (Ruiz & Pav.) Kuijt S
    [ = P. stelis (L.) Kuijt ] A
- Pionandra
  - P. obliqua (Ruiz & Pav.) Miers S
    [ = Cyphomandra obliqua (Ruiz & Pav.) Sendtn. ] U
    [ = Solanum obliquum Ruiz & Pav. ] S (basionym)
  - P. pendula (Ruiz & Pav.) Miers S
    [ = Cyphomandra pendula (Ruiz & Pav.) Sendtn. ] U
    [ = Solanum pendulum Ruiz & Pav. ] S (basionym)
  - P. viridiflora (Ruiz & Pav.) Miers S
    [ = Cyphomandra viridiflora (Ruiz & Pav.) Sendtn. ] U
    [ $\neq$ Solanum viridiflorum Ruiz & Pav.* ] S ] (basionym)

* Note: According to Tropicos, Solanum viridiflorum is the basionym of Pionandra viridiflora, but is not its synonym (see here); according to The Plant List entry for Solanum viarum, S. viridiflorum is synonymous with S. viarum. (Retrieved February 8, 2012)

- Polylepis Ruiz & Pav.
  - P. dependens Ruiz & Pav. U
  - P. racemosa Ruiz & Pav. A (type)
- Pteromonnina
  - P. linearifolia (Ruiz & Pav.) B.Eriksen S
    [ = Monnina linearifolia Ruiz & Pav. ] A
  - P. macrostachya (Ruiz & Pav.) B.Eriksen A
  - P. pterocarpa (Ruiz & Pav.) B.Eriksen A
- Pycreus
  - P. niger (Ruiz & Pav.) Cufod. A
  - P. niger (Ruiz & Pav.) T.Koyama S
    [ = Cyperus niger Ruiz & Pav. var. niger ] U (autonym)
- Roupala
  - R. monosperma (Ruiz & Pav.) I.M.Johnst. A
  - R. pinnata (Ruiz & Pav.) Diels S
    [ = Euplassa pinnata (Lam.) I.M.Johnst. ] A
- Salpiglossis Ruiz & Pav.
  - S. sinuata Ruiz & Pav. A (type)
- Saracha Ruiz & Pav.
  - S. biflora Ruiz & Pav. S (basionym of Jaltomata biflora)
    [ = Jaltomata biflora (Ruiz & Pav.) Benítez ] A
  - S. contorta Ruiz & Pav. A
  - S. dentata Ruiz & Pav. S (basionym of Jaltomata dentata)
    [ = Jaltomata dentata (Ruiz & Pav.) Benítez ] A
  - S. procumbens (Cav.) Ruiz & Pav. S
    [ = Jaltomata procumbens (Cav.) J.L.Gentry ] A
  - S. punctata Ruiz & Pav. A (type)
- Sarmienta Ruiz & Pav.
  - S. repens Ruiz & Pav. S (type)
    [ = S. scandens (J.D.Brandis ex Molina) Pers. ] A
- Satureja
  - S. elliptica (Ruiz & Pav.) Briq. S
    [ = Clinopodium speciosum (Hook.) Govaerts ] A
    [ = Gardoquia elliptica Ruiz & Pav. ] S (basionym)
  - S. incana (Ruiz & Pav.) Spreng. S
    [ = Clinopodium breviflorum (Benth.) Govaerts ] A
    [ = Gardoquia incana Ruiz & Pav. ] S (basionym)
  - S. multiflora (Ruiz & Pav.) Briq. S
    [ = Clinopodium multiflorum (Ruiz & Pav.) Kuntze ] A
    [ = Gardoquia multiflora Ruiz & Pav. ] S (basionym)
  - S. obovata (Ruiz & Pav.) Briq. S (nom. illeg.)
    [ = Clinopodium obovatum (Ruiz & Pav.) Govaerts ] A
    [ = Gardoquia obovata Ruiz & Pav. ] S (basionym)
  - S. revoluta (Ruiz & Pav.) Briq. S
    [ = Clinopodium revolutum (Ruiz & Pav.) Govaerts ] A
    [ = Gardoquia revoluta Ruiz & Pav. ] S (basionym)
  - S. striata (Ruiz & Pav.) Briq. S
    [ = Clinopodium striatum (Ruiz & Pav.) Govaerts ] A
    [ = Gardoquia striata Ruiz & Pav. ] S (basionym)
- Schizanthus Ruiz & Pav.
  - S. pinnatus Ruiz & Pav. A (type)
- Solanum
  - S. acuminatum Ruiz & Pav. A
  - S. acutifolium Ruiz & Pav. S (basionym of Lycianthes acutifolia)
    [ = Lycianthes acutifolia (Ruiz & Pav.) Bitter ] A
  - S. agrimoniifolium (Ruiz & Pav. ex Dunal) J.F.Macbr. S
    [ = Lycopersicon hirsutum Dunal ] A
  - S. anceps Ruiz & Pav. A
  - S. angulatum Ruiz & Pav. S
    [ = S. quitoense Lam. ] A
  - S. angustifolium Ruiz & Pav. S
    [ = S. cutervanum Zahlbr. ] A
  - S. angustifolium Ruiz & Pav. U
  - S. asperolanatum Ruiz & Pav. A
  - S. biformifolium Ruiz & Pav. S (basionym of Lycianthes biformifolia)
    [ = Lycianthes biformifolia (Ruiz & Pav.) Bitter ] A
  - S. calygnaphalum Ruiz & Pav. S
    [ = S. nitidum Ruiz & Pav. ] A
  - S. conicum Ruiz & Pav. A
  - S. crispum Ruiz & Pav. A
  - S. cymosum Ruiz & Pav. S
    [ = S. aloysiifolium Dunal ] A
  - S. dichotomum Ruiz & Pav. S
    [ = S. riparium Pers. ] A
  - S. diffusum Ruiz & Pav. S
    [ = S. ternatum Ruiz & Pav. ] A
  - S. diffusum var. miozygum (Ruiz & Pav.) J.F.Macbr. S
    [ = S. ternatum Ruiz & Pav. ] A
  - S. diffusum subsp. miozygum Ruiz & Pav. S
    [ = S. ternatum Ruiz & Pav. ] A
  - S. filiforme Ruiz & Pav. A
  - S. foetidum Ruiz & Pav. S
    [ = S. luteoalbum Pers. var. luteoalbum ] A
  - S. glandulosum Ruiz & Pav. S (basionym of Lycianthes glandulosa)
    [ = Lycianthes glandulosa (Ruiz & Pav.) Bitter ] A
  - S. grandiflorum Ruiz & Pav. A
  - S. incanum Ruiz & Pav. S
    [ = S. albidum Dunal ] A
  - S. incarceratum Ruiz & Pav. A
  - S. incurvum Ruiz & Pav. A
  - S. laciniatum Ruiz & Pav. S
    [ = S. nemorense Dunal ] A
  - S. lanceolatum Ruiz & Pav. S
    [ = S. ruizii S.Knapp ] A
  - S. lineatum Ruiz & Pav. S (basionym of Lycianthes lineata)
    [ = Lycianthes lineata (Ruiz & Pav.) Bitter ] A
  - S. mite Ruiz & Pav. A
  - S. multifidum Ruiz & Pav. S
    [ = S. multifidum Lam. ] A
  - S. multitidum Ruiz & Pav. U
  - S. nitidum Ruiz & Pav. A
  - S. nutans Ruiz & Pav. A
  - S. obliquum Ruiz & Pav. S (basionym of Cyphomandra obliqua and Pionandra obliqua)
    [ = Cyphomandra obliqua (Ruiz & Pav.) Sendtn. ] U
    [ = Pionandra obliqua (Ruiz & Pav.) Miers ] S
  - S. oblongum Ruiz & Pav. S
    [ = S. trichoneuron Lillo ] A
  - S. oppositifolium Ruiz & Pav. A
  - S. pendulum Ruiz & Pav. S (basionym of Cyphomandra pendula and Pionandra pendula)
    [ = Cyphomandra pendula (Ruiz & Pav.) Sendtn. ] U
    Pionandra pendula (Ruiz & Pav.) Miers ] S
  - S. pinnatifidum Ruiz & Pav. S
    [ = S. multifidum Lam. ] A
  - S. pubescens Ruiz & Pav. S
    [ = S. luteoalbum Pers. var. luteoalbum ] A
  - S. runcinatum Ruiz & Pav. S
    [ = S. pinnatum Cav. ] A
  - S. scabrum Ruiz & Pav. S
    [ = S. saponaceum Dunal ] A
  - S. sericeum Ruiz & Pav. A
  - S. sessile Ruiz & Pav. A
  - S. stellatum Ruiz & Pav. S
    [ = S. asperolanatum Ruiz & Pav. ] A
  - S. ternatum Ruiz & Pav. A
  - S. variegatum Ruiz & Pav. S
    [ = S. muricatum Aiton ] A
  - S. viridiflorum Ruiz & Pav. S (basionym of Cyphomandra viridiflora)
    [ = S. viarum Dunal ] A
    [ poss. = Cyphomandra viridiflora (Ruiz & Pav.) Sendtn.* ] U

* Note: According to Tropicos, Solanum viridiflorum is the basionym of Cyphomandra viridiflora, and its synonym (see here); but on The Plant List entry for Solanum viridiflorum, C. viridiflora is not included as a synonym. (Retrieved February 8, 2012)

- Sphaerine (nom. inval.)
  [ = Bomarea Mirb.]
  - S. coccinea (Ruiz & Pav.) Herb. S
    [ = Alstroemeria coccinea Ruiz & Pav. ] S
    [ = Bomarea coccinea (Ruiz & Pav.) Baker ] A
  - S. distichophylla (Ruiz & Pav.) Herb.* S (lectotype)
    [ = Alstroemeria distichifolia Ruiz & Pav. ] S (basionym)
    [ = Bomarea distichifolia (Ruiz & Pav.) Baker ] A
    [ = Danbya distichifolia (Ruiz & Pav.) Salisb. ] S (nom. inval.)
  - S. secundifolia (Ruiz & Pav.) Herb. S
    [ = Alstroemeria secundifolia Ruiz & Pav. ] S
    [ = Bomarea secundifolia (Ruiz & Pav.) Baker ] A
    [ = Danbya secundifolia (Ruiz & Pav.) Salisb. ] S (nom. inval.)

* Note: According to the Plant List entry for Sphaerine distichophylla the binomial authority is '(Spreng.) Herb.'; while the Tropicos entry for the same is given as '(Ruiz & Pav.) Herb.'

- Sudamerlycaste
  - S. ciliata (Ruiz & Pav.) Archila A
  - S. longipetala (Ruiz & Pav.) Archila S
    [ = Maxillaria longipetala Ruiz & Pav. ] A
- Stipa
  - S. ichu (Ruiz & Pav) Kunth A
    [ = Jarava ichu Ruiz & Pav. ] S (basionym)
- Talinum
  - T. album Ruiz & Pav. S
    [ = Calandrinia alba (Ruiz & Pav.) DC. ] A
  - T. ciliatum Ruiz & Pav. S
    [ = Calandrinia ciliata (Ruiz & Pav.) DC. ] A
  - T. crenatum Ruiz & Pav. S
    [ = Cistanthe paniculata (Ruiz & Pav.) Carolin ex Hershk. ] A
  - T. dichotomum Ruiz & Pav. S
    [ = T. paniculatum (Jacq.) Gaertn. ] A
  - T. lingulatum Ruiz & Pav. S
    [ = Cistanthe lingulata (Ruiz & Pav.) Hershk. ] A
  - T. monandrum Ruiz & Pav. S
    [ = Calandrinia monandra Hershk. ] A
  - T. nitidum Ruiz & Pav. U
  - T. paniculatum Ruiz & Pav. S (homonym of T. paniculatum (Jacq.) Gaertn.)
    [ = Cistanthe paniculata (Ruiz & Pav.) Carolin ex Hershk. ] A
  - T. polyandrum Ruiz & Pav. S
    [ = Cistanthe paniculata (Ruiz & Pav.) Carolin ex Hershk. ] A
  - T. rostratum Ruiz & Pav. U
  - T. umbellatum Ruiz & Pav. S
    [ = Montiopsis umbellata (Ruiz & Pav.) D.I.Ford A ]
- Tricondylus
  - T. obliqua (Ruiz & Pav.) Kuntze S
    [ = Lomatia hirsuta (Lam.) Diels ] A
- Triglochin
  - T. ciliata Ruiz & Pav. U
  - T. striata Ruiz & Pav. A
- Triptilion Ruiz & Pav.
  - T. spinosum Ruiz & Pav. A
- Tropaeolum
  - T. bicolor Ruiz & Pav. A
  - T. ciliatum Ruiz & Pav. A
  - T. denticulatum Ruiz & Pav. ex Kuntze U
  - T. dipetalum Ruiz & Pav. A
  - T. tuberosum Ruiz & Pav. A

=== Genera (U — Z) ===
- Verbena
  - V. clavata Ruiz & Pav. S (basionym of Glandularia clavata)
    [ = Glandularia clavata (Ruiz & Pav.) Botta ] A
  - V. corymbosa Ruiz & Pav. S (basionym of Glandularia corymbosa and Zappania corymbosa)
    [ = Glandularia corymbosa (Ruiz & Pav.) N.O'Leary & P.Peralta ] A
    [ = Zappania corymbosa (Ruiz & Pav.) Poir. ] S
  - V. cuneifolia Ruiz & Pav. A (basionym of Glandularia cuneifolia)
    [ = Glandularia cuneifolia (Ruiz & Pav.) Binder ] S
  - V. dichotoma Ruiz & Pav. S
    [ = Stachytarpheta cayennensis (Rich.) Vahl ] A
  - V. hispida Ruiz & Pav. A
  - V. multifida Ruiz & Pav. S
    [ = Glandularia laciniata (L.) Schnack & Covas ] A
  - V. virgata Ruiz & Pav. S
    [ = Aloysia virgata (Ruiz & Pav.) Juss. ] A
- Vestia
  - V. foetida (Ruiz & Pav.) Hoffmanns.* A
    [ = Periphragmos foetidus Ruiz & Pav. ] S (basionym)

* Note: According to the Plant List entry for Vestia foetida the binomial authority is shown as simply 'Hoffmanns.'; while the GRIN entry for the same is given as '(Ruiz & Pav.) Hoffmanns.'
