= Paleoethnobotany of the Mapuche =

The paleoethnobotany of the Mapuche focuses on archaeological evidence supporting plant use by past and present Mapuche populations collected from multiple sites in southern Chile and the Patagonia region of Argentina. Paleoethnobotany is the study of fossil and material remains from plants, mostly seeds and residues that can be analyzed from material remains. Data can be collected from archaeological sites with a particular interest in learning about the history of agriculture in a region or the use of plants for either subsistence or medicinal use. The Mapuche are an indigenous culture native to South America. The archaeological record has revealed that the Mapuche were present in modern-day south-central Chile and southwestern Argentina from at least 500-600 BC. It is also noteworthy, that while collectively the Mapuche (Picunche, Huilliche and Moluche or Nguluche) use this endonym, there are often subsets of the culture that have more specific names based on geographic location as well as different ecological niches (See Mapuche: Etymology).

== Regional sites in South America ==
=== Central and Southern Chile ===
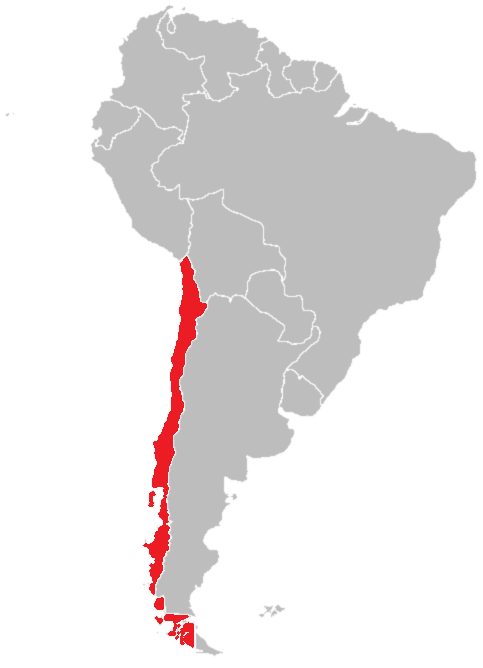

==== Cerro del Inga ====
The Promaucaes, a Mapuche group, were the last group of indigenous peoples to occupy this site in modern-day Chile in the Cachapoal Valley. Archeobotanical analysis was conducted at these sites in relation to pre-Hispanic cultures dominated by the Incan civilization. This site serves as a point of resistance to both Incan occupation as well as Spanish colonization. Analysis of seeds and macromaterials from soil reveal the following plants were present at this site. Cultivated plants included: Maize (Zea mays), Madi (Madia chilensis), Quinoa (Chenopodium quinua), Sunflower (Helianthus sp. cf. tuberosum), Gourd (Lagenaria sp.). Fruiting bushes and trees included: Guillave (Echinopsis chilensis) Michay (Berberis sp.), Boldo (Peumus boldus), Quilo (Muehlenbeckia hastulata) Grape (Vitis sp.), Blackberry (Rubus sp.), Cocito, Palm Nut (Jubaea chilensis). Legumes included: Unidentified, small (Astragalus sp.?) Unidentified, large, Lupine (Lupinus sp.). Medicinal herbs included: Pata de Guanaco (Cistanthe grandiflora) along with some wild plants: Various Grasses (Poaceae), Colliguay (Colliguaja odifera), Espino (Acacia caven), Lengua de Gato (Galium sp.), Sedge (Cyperus sp.), and Chenopod (Chenopodium sp.).

=== Central and Southern Argentina ===
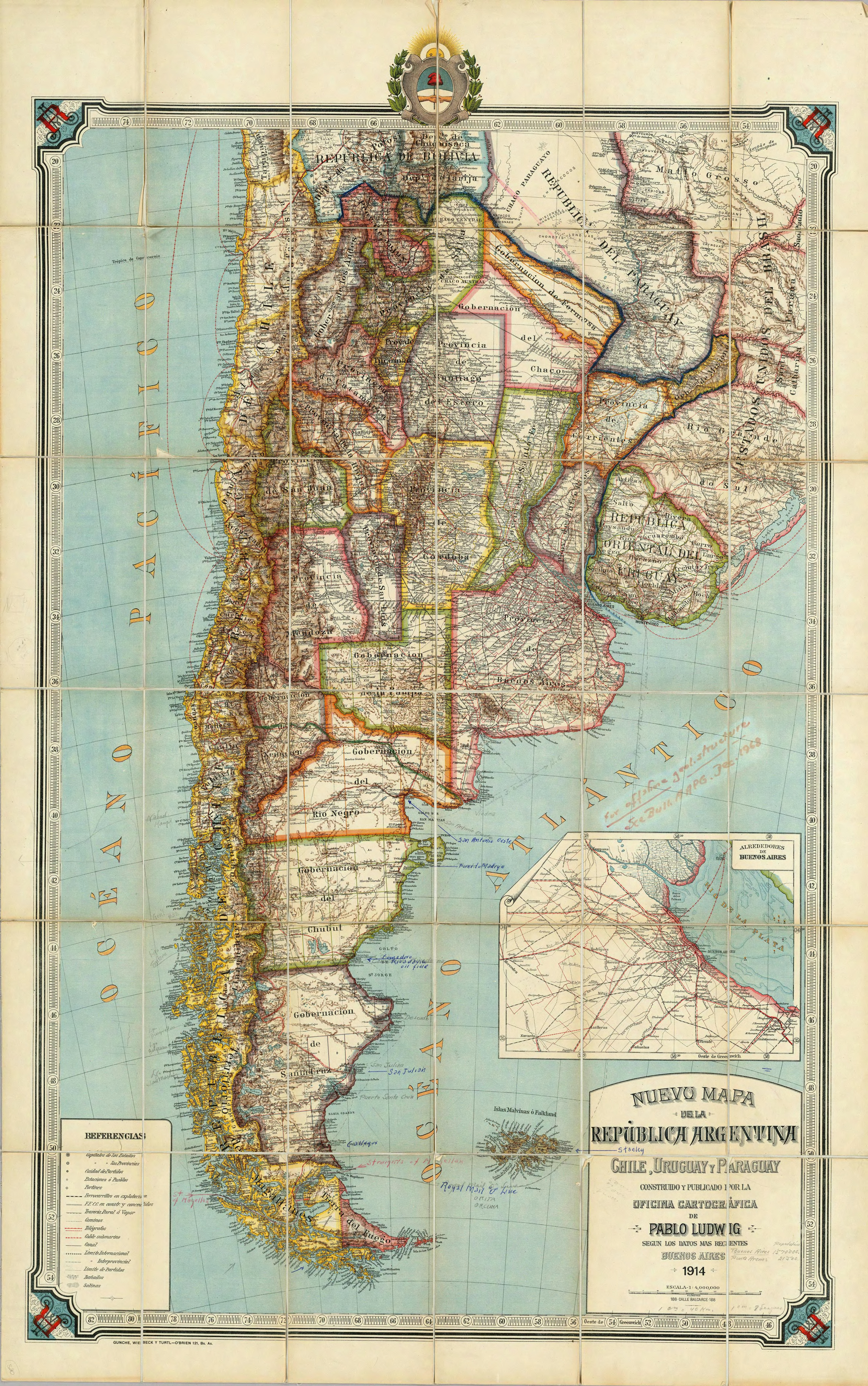

==== La Pampa ====
There are a series of 5 sites (1,3,5, La Lomita) located in the La Pampa region of Argentina that demonstrate the historical presence of pre-Hispanic hunter-gatherers and farming cultures in west-central Argentina in the period of the Upper Holocene to the Lower Holocene. Food residues were analyzed from 23 sherds from pottery obtained from these sites. The following food and plant materials were found on the internal and external surface of the sherds: Zea mays (corn), Prosopis, Poaceae phytoliths, and Fungal zoospores and hyphae. These findings suggest that there was some trading between agricultural groups of Andean region, in South-central Chile, with and the hunter-gathers of La Pampa.

==== West-Central Patagonia ====
There are two sites of interest for studying hunter gatherers in the Holocene in West-central Patagonia; these sites include the cave sites of El Chueco 1 (11,500–180 cal BP) and Baño Nuevo 1 (10,800–3,000 cal BP). The El Chueco 1 cave is located at 44°29′36′′S; 71°11′13′′W. The Baño Nuevo is located at 45º17′ S, 71º32′ W. The west-central Patagonia region where these sites are located typically have a dry climate. The average rainfall for this area is 400 mm and the average temperature is 7 °C. With regard to the stability of the region, "palaeoenvironmental reconstructions for the region indicate no major changes in the distribution of vegetation since approximately 8,000 calBP." Samples for these two sites gathered information about plant micro-remains from the Pleistocene-Holocene transition to the Late Holocene. The number of different types of plants from the stratigraphy sampled varied between the two sites, with EC1 exhibiting fewer plant micro-remains in the Early Holocene with a fairly steady increase into the Late Holocene, while BN1 exhibited a greater range of plant micro-remains in the Early Holocene and there was a steady decline in percentage of plant micro-remains in the sample. The micro-remains of the plants suggest that the following plants were in use at these sites: Alstroemeriaceae, Apiaceae, Apiaceae, Berberis, Brassicaceae, Brassicaceae, Calceolariaceae, Carex sp., Chenopodiaceae, Convolvulaceae, Cyperus sp., Cyperaceae, Eleocharis sp., Ericaceae, Fabaceae, Fragaria chiloensis, Galium sp., Lamiaceae, Libertia sp., Malvaceae, Phacelia sp., Poaceae, Polygonaceae, Portulaceae, Rubus sp., Scirpus sp., and Uncinia sp. with a large number of the plants samples unable to be identified.

==== Sierras de Córdoba ====
In Central Argentina, there is some evidence of agriculture in the region by 1000 BP. The Sierras de Córdoba, in Central Argentina, are west of the modern city of Córdoba and east of the Andean range separating Argentina from Chile. In one study, 15 sites in the Sierras de Córdoba were analyzed for plant macroremains and microremains. The following results were obtained from the Late Holocene and into the Pre-Columbian period. Quebrada Norte 7: Sarcomphalus mistol, Lithraea molloides, Zea mays, Condalia sp., Prosopis sp., Schinua cf. areria, Phaseolus sp., Chenopodium quinoa var. quinoa, C. quinoa cf. var. melanospermum, Amaranthus sp.; Pozancón 1: Solanum cf. tuberosum, cf. Ipomea/Manihot.; Casa del Sol 8: Zea mays.; El Alto 3: Polylepis autralis, Maytenus boaria.; Quebrada del Real 1: Chenopodium sp., Zea mays.; Cruz Chiquita 3: Zea mays.; Río Yuspe 11: Sarcomphalus mistol.; Boyo Paso 2: Sarcomphalus mistol, Zea mays, Phaseolus vulgaris, Prosopis sp., Oxalis sp.; Yaco Pampa 1: Zea mays, cf. Prosopis sp.; Arroyo Tala Cañada 1: Zea mays, Cucurbita sp., Phaseolus vulgaris, P. lunatus.; Arroyo Talainín 2: cf. Lithraea molloides.; C.Pun.39: Prosopis sp., Chenopodium/Amaranthus sp., Zea mays, P. vulgaris, P. lunatis, Cucurbita sp.; Río Yuspe 14: Sarcomphalus mistol.; Puesto la Esquina 1: Zea mays, P. vulgaris var. vulgaris, P vulgaris var. aborigineus, P. lunatus.; Cerco de la Cueva Pintada: cf. Prosopis sp.; Arroyo Tala Huasi: Zea mays.

== Contemporary Mapuche ethnobotany ==
Plant use from modern ethnographic data:

Order	Family	Species, Latin name	Indigenous Name
Algae	Durvillaceae	Durvillaea utilis	Collofe
Lichens	Usneaceae	Usnea florida	Ponpon mamiill
Bryophyta	Marchantiaceae	Marchantia berteroana	Paillahue
Pteridophyta	Polypodiaceae	Blechnum hastatum	Anuculcul
Pteridophyta	Polypodiaceae	Nephrodium rugulosum	Huilel-lahuen
Pteridophyta	Polypodiaceae	Polystichum aculeatum	Piillomam-lahuen
Pteridophyta	Gleicheniaceae	Gleichenia littoralis	Utidahue
Pteridophyta	Cyathaceae	Lophosoria quadripinnata	Anpe, Ampe, Ampi
Pteridophyta	Equisetaceae	Equisetum arvense	Livn-voro, Livtun-chigue, Livn-cudall-cudall
Pteridophyta	Equisetaceae	Equisetum bogotense	Calcha-lahuen
Pteridophyta	Lycopodiaceae	Lycopodium paniculatum	Llanca-lahuen
Gymnosperms	Araucariaceae	Araucaria araucana	Pehuen Resin
Angiosperms	Urticaceae	Pilea elegans	Coyam-lahuen
Angiosperms	Proteaceae	Embothrium coccineum	Chreumtin
Angiosperms	Proteaceae	Lomatia ferruginea	Huinque
Angiosperms	Proteaceae	Lomatia hirsuta	Raddal
Angiosperms	Santalaceae	Quinchamalium majus	Ctinchamalin
Angiosperms	Loranthaceae	Lepidoceras squamifer	Epucamamiill
Angiosperms	Loranthaceae	Loranthus tetrandrus	Cunchral
Angiosperms	Polygonaceae	Muehlenbeckia tamnifolia	Pulai-vogui
Angiosperms	Polygonaceae	Rumex crispus	Dahue-pillan
Angiosperms	Phytolaccaceae	Anisomeria drastica	Pircun-lahuen
Angiosperms	Phytolaccaceae	Ercilla volubilis	Sinchull
Angiosperms	Gunneraceae	Gunnera chibensis	Nalca
Angiosperms	Caryophyllaceae	Pentacaena polycnemoides	Decha-lahuen
Angiosperms	Caryophyllaceae	Stellaria media	Quilloi
Angiosperms	Chenopodiaceae	Chenopodium ambrosioides	Pichipichin
Angiosperms	Chenopodiaceae	Chenopodium quinoa	Dahue
Angiosperms	Magnoliaceae	Drimys winteri	Voigue
Angiosperms	Monimiaceae	Laurelia sempervirens	Chrihue
Angiosperms	Monimiaceae	Laurelia philippiana	Huahuan
Angiosperms	Lauraceae	Cryptocarya rubra	Pengu
Angiosperms	Ranunculaceae	Caltha andicola (Gay) Walp.	Mellico
Angiosperms	Berberidaceae	Berberis darwinii	Chacui-hua
Angiosperms	Crassulaceae	Sedum telephium	Congona
Angiosperms	Saxifragaceae	Escallonia pulverulenta	Rùvùl
Angiosperms	Saxifragaceae	Escallonia revoluta	Yang
Angiosperms	Coriariaceae	Coriaria ruscifolia	Deu
Angiosperms	Rosaceae	Acaena argentea	Upelneguru
Angiosperms	Rosaceae	Acaena ovulifolia	Chreuo
Angiosperms	Rosaceae	Margyricarpus setosus	Rimu
Angiosperms	Mimosaceae	Acacia cavenia	Huayun, Cuhuen, Cauen
Angiosperms	Caesalpinaceae	Bauhinia candicans	Lahuen-Huiguln
Angiosperms	Papilionaceae	Psoralea glandulosa	Culen
Angiosperms	Papilionaceae	Sophora tetraptera	Pulu
Angiosperms	Cunoniaeeae	Weinmannia trichosperma	Teniu
Angiosperms	Geraniaceae	Geranium core-core	Corecore
Angiosperms	Tropaeolaceae	Tropaeolum speciosum	Rere-lahuen
Angiosperms	Linaceae	Linum selaginoides	Pinque-luhuen
Angiosperms	Oxalidaceae	Oxalis corniculata	Culle
Angiosperms	Oxalidaceae	Oxalis lobata	Rümü
Angiosperms	Oxalidaceae	Oxalis rosea	Huallco
Angiosperms	Oxalidaceae	Oxalis succulenta	Cuya
Angiosperms	Euphorbiaceae	Euphorbia lathyris	Üchrarlahuen
Angiosperms	Rutaceae	Pitaviu punctata	Pichrau
Angiosperms	Rutaceae	Ruta graveolens	Ruda
Angiosperms	Anacardiaceae	Schinus latifolia	Molle
Angiosperms	Rhamnaceae	Retanilla ephedra	Caman
Angiosperms	Rhamnaceae	Talguenea costata	Chralhuen
Angiosperms	Elaeocarpaceae	Aristotelia macqui	Maqui
Angiosperms	Elaeocarpaceae	Crinodendron hookerianum	Chaquigue
Angiosperms	Elaeocarpaceae	Crinodendron patagua	Patagua
Angiosperms	Tiliaceae	Tilia vulgaris	Tilo
Angiosperms	Malvaceae	Abutilon uitifolium	Huella
Angiosperms	Malvaceae	Modiola caroliuna	Pilupila
Angiosperms	Thymelaeaceae	Ovidia pillo-pillo	Pillo-Pillo
Angiosperms	Flacourtiaceae	Azara lanceolatu	Pùdhue

== Modern ethnobotany of the Selkʼnam ==
Plant use from Tierra del Fuego based on modern ethnographic data:

Species	Indigenous name	English name	Used part	Preparation way	Use	Source
Acaena ovalifolia Ruiz & Pavón	Tâpl, hálcha	Two-spined Acaena	Root	Boiled, applied with a bandage to wounds	Medicinal	Martínez-Crovetto (1968)
Adesmia lotoides Hooker f.	Kiárksh	Leguminosae family	Rhizomes	Direct consumption	Food	Martínez-Crovetto (1968)
Agaricus pampeanus Speg.	Álpen téen	–	Fruiting body (mushroom)	Raw	Food	Martínez-Crovetto (1968)
Agropyron patagonicum (Speg.) Parodi	Sâl	Couch grass family	Flower wearing stalks	Little baskets	Technology	Martínez-Crovetto (1968)
Apium australe Thouars	Kiel, aitá, alché	Wild celery	Leaves and roots	Direct consumption or boiled	Food	Gusinde (1931)
Apium australe Thouars	Kiel, aitá, alché	Wild celery	Leaves and roots	Direct consumption or boiled	Food	Martínez-Crovetto (1968)
Apium australe Thouars	Kiel, aitá, alché	Wild celery	Leaves and roots	Direct consumption or boiled	Food	Gallardo (1998)
Apium australe Thouars	Kiel, aitá, alché	Wild celery	Leaves and roots	Direct consumption or boiled	Food	Beauvoir (1998)
Arjona patagonica Dcne	Téen	Santalaceae family	Roots and tubers	Direct consumption	Food	Martínez-Crovetto (1968)
Azorella filamentosa Lam.	Téshuen	Azorella	Roots and tubers	Direct consumption or baked in the ashes	Food	Martínez-Crovetto (1968)
Azorella lycopodioides Gaudich, A. monantha Clos, A. selago Hooker f.,	Tes, tesh, téshue)n	Azorella	Roots and tubers	Direct consumption or baked in the ashes	Food	Martínez-Crovetto (1968)
A. trifurcata (Gaertner) Hooker f.	Tes, tesh, téshue)n	Azorella	Roots and tubers	Direct consumption or baked in the ashes	Food	Martínez-Crovetto (1968)
Berberis buxifolia Lam.	Maces, me’ch, miích, mich	Box-leaved barberry	Berries	Direct consumption	Food	Gusinde (1931)
Berberis buxifolia Lam.	Maces, me’ch, miích, mich	Box-leaved barberry	Berries	Direct consumption	Food	Bridges (2000)
Berberis buxifolia Lam.	Maces, me’ch, miích, mich	Box-leaved barberry	Berries	Direct consumption	Food	Martínez-Crovetto (1968)
Berberis buxifolia Lam.	Maces, me’ch, miích, mich	Box-leaved barberry	Berries	Direct consumption	Food	Gallardo (1998)
Berberis buxifolia Lam.	Maces, me’ch, miích, mich	Box-leaved barberry	Berries	Direct consumption	Food	Beauvoir
Berberis empetrifolia Lam.	Mich kan, mich	Crowberry-leaved barberry	Berries	Direct consumption	Food	Martínez-Crovetto (1968)
Bolax caespitose Hombron & Jacquinot	Téshue)n, tíshue)n	Apiaceae family	Roots and tubers	Direct consumption or baked in the ashes	Food	Martínez-Crovetto (1968)
Bolax gummifera (Lam.) Sprengel	Téshue)n, tíshue)n	Balsam bog	Roots and tubers	Direct consumption or baked in the ashes	Food	Martínez-Crovetto (1968)
Boopis australis Dcne	Íshta	Calyceraceae family	Roots and tubers	Baked in the ashes	Food	Martínez-Crovetto (1968)
Boopis australis Dcne	Íshta	Calyceraceae family	Roots and tubers	Baked in the ashes	Food	Beauvoir (1998)
Calvatia bovista var. magellanica (L.) Pers.	Wó	Burst puffball	Fruiting body (mushroom)	Dried as tinder for starting fires	Technology	Martínez-Crovetto (1968)
Calvatia lilacina (Mont. & Berk.) Henn.	Wookét, woojét	Puffball	Fruiting body (mushroom)	Burnt: its smoke was inhaled to clear in case of a cold	Medicinal	Martínez-Crovetto (1968)
Chiliotrichum diffusum (Forster f.) O. Kuntze	Kóor, kó’or	Fachine	Branches	Used for tattoos. Flowers were rubbed on the eyes to clear the sight	Personal ornament. Medicinal	Martínez-Crovetto (1968)
Cladonia laevigata Vain.	Chepl, chispl, shûj	Lichen species	Whole plant	For body washing, before getting dry with ánhuel (Usnea sp.)	Hygiene	Martínez-Crovetto (1968)
Cyttaria darwinii Berkeley; C. Harioti Fischer; C. Hookeri Berkeley	Terr, têr	–	Fruiting body (mushroom)	Raw or baked	Food	Martínez-Crovetto (1968)
Descurainia canenscens auct., non (Nutt) Prantl; D. antarctica (E. Fourn.) O. E. Schultz	Thai, tâíiu, taáiu	Tansy mustard genus	Seed	Ground and toasted, mixed with guanaco fat	Food	Gusinde (1931)
Descurainia canenscens auct., non (Nutt) Prantl; D. antarctica (E. Fourn.) O. E. Schultz	Thai, tâíiu, taáiu	Tansy mustard genus	Seed	Ground and toasted, mixed with guanaco fat	Food	Beauvoir (1998)
Descurainia canenscens auct., non (Nutt) Prantl; D. antarctica (E. Fourn.) O. E. Schultz	Thai, tâíiu, taáiu	Tansy mustard genus	Seed	Ground and toasted, mixed with guanaco fat	Food	Gallardo (1998)
Descurainia canenscens auct., non (Nutt) Prantl; D. antarctica (E. Fourn.) O. E. Schultz	Thai, tâíiu, taáiu	Tansy mustard genus	Seed	Ground and toasted, mixed with guanaco fat	Food	Martínez-Crovetto (1968)
Drimys winteri Foster & Foster f.	Choól, chôl	Winter's Bark	Bark	Decoction against dandruff	Hygiene	Martínez-Crovetto (1968)
Empetrum rubrum Vahl ex Willd.	Kôl, kôle. Fruto: wasax, wáshj, wásje	Diddle-dee	Berries	Direct consumption	Food	Gusinde (1931)
Empetrum rubrum Vahl ex Willd.	Kôl, kôle. Fruto: wasax, wáshj, wásje	Diddle-dee	Berries	Direct consumption	Food	Martínez-Crovetto (1968)
Festuca gracillima Hooker f.	Ôt	Tussac	Grass	Stuffing for leather shoes	Clothing	Martínez-Crovetto (1968)
Fistulina hepatica (Schaeff.) With.	Oandiyá; po’otá; kiliút, kéluet	Beefsteak	Fruiting body (mushroom)	Raw	Food	Martínez-Crovetto (1968)
Fragaria chiloensis (L.) Mill.	Óltâ, ólta, ou)ltá	Chilean strawberry	Fruits	Direct consumption	Food	Martínez-Crovetto (1968)
Fragaria chiloensis (L.) Mill.	Óltâ, ólta, ou)ltá	Chilean strawberry	Fruits	Direct consumption	Food	Gallardo (1998)
Hypochoeris incana (Hooker & Arn.) Macloskie; H. incana var. integrifolia (Sch. Bip. ex Walp.) Cabrera	Sóol; álbi	Asteraceae family	Roots and tubers	Grilled or baked in the ashes	Food	Martínez-Crovetto (1968)
Hypochoeris radicata L.	Oitá	Hairy cat's ear	Leaves	Direct consumption	Food	Martínez-Crovetto (1968)
Marsippospermum grandiflorum (L. f.) Hooker f.	Tâíiu, taáiiu, tai, táiu, Kartay	Juncaceae family	Stalk	Roasted and flattened by hand to weave baskets	Technology	Martínez-Crovetto (1968)
Marsippospermum grandiflorum (L. f.) Hooker f.	Tâíiu, taáiiu, tai, táiu, Kartay	Juncaceae family	Stalk	Roasted and flattened by hand to weave baskets	Technology	Beauvoir
Mysodendron punctulatum Banks ex D.C.	Ténokán, tenoká, téno	Mistletoes genus	Whole plant	Body rubbing against muscular pains	Medicinal	Martínez-Crovetto (1968)
Nothofagus antarctica (Forster f.) Oersted	Shuwínshi	Antarctic beech/low beech	Wood	Tools and hut building	Technology	Gusinde (1931)
Nothofagus antarctica (Forster f.) Oersted	Shuwínshi	Antarctic beech/low beech	Wood	Tools and hut building	Technology	Martínez-Crovetto (1968)
Nothofagus betuloides (Mirbel) Oersted	Kîeñú, kenñú, iéñu, kíniu, kiñiú	Magellan's beech	Bark	Bird hunting torches	Technology	Martínez-Crovetto (1968)
Nothofagus pumilio (Poeppig & Endl.) Krasser	Kualchñinke, kualchínk	Lenga	Sap	Direct consumption	Food	Martínez-Crovetto (1968)
Oreomyrrhis andicola auct., non (Kunth) Hooker f.	Seltái	Apiaceae family	Roots and tubers	Direct consumption	Food	Martínez-Crovetto (1968)
Pernettya mucronata (L. f.) Gaudich. ex G. Don.	Seuwh, shal	Ericaceae family	Berries	Direct consumption	Food	Gusinde (1931)
Pernettya mucronata (L. f.) Gaudich. ex G. Don.	Seuwh, shal	Ericaceae family	Berries	Direct consumption	Food	Beauvoir (1998)
Pernettya mucronata (L. f.) Gaudich. ex G. Don.	Seuwh, shal	Ericaceae family	Berries	Direct consumption	Food	Gallardo (1998)
Pernettya mucronata (L. f.) Gaudich. ex G. Don.	Seuwh, shal	Ericaceae family	Berries	Direct consumption	Food	Martínez-Crovetto (1968)
Pernettya pumila (L. f.) Hooker	Shal	Ericaceae family	Berries	Direct consumption	Food	Martínez-Crovetto (1968)
Polyporus eucalyptorum Fr.	Hashkélta; eusá; eushá; ká’mi;	–	Fruiting body (mushroom)	Direct consumption	Food	Martínez-Crovetto (1968)
Polyporus aff. Gayanus Lév.	Eusá	–	Fruiting body (mushroom)	Direct consumption	Food	Martínez-Crovetto (1968)
Ribes magellanicum Poiret	Shéthrhen, estén, shitr, shetrr	Wild currant	Berries, tea of leaves and infusion of bark	Direct consumption or boiling of some parts	Food	Martínez-Crovetto (1968)
Rubus geoides Sm.	Waásh shal	Rainberry	Berries	Direct consumption	Food	Martínez-Crovetto (1968)
Rubus geoides Sm.	Waásh shal	Rainberry	Berries	Direct consumption	Food	Gallardo (1998)
Taraxacum magellanicum, Comm. ex Sch. Bip.; T. gilliesii Hooker & Arn. and T. officinale Weber	Oiten, oitá, oitáoi, oi’tá	Dandelion	Flowers, leaves and roots	Direct consumption	Food	Gusinde (1931)
Taraxacum magellanicum, Comm. ex Sch. Bip.; T. gilliesii Hooker & Arn. and T. officinale Weber	Oiten, oitá, oitáoi, oi’tá	Dandelion	Flowers, leaves and roots	Direct consumption	Food	Martínez-Crovetto (1968)
Taraxacum magellanicum, Comm. ex Sch. Bip.; T. gilliesii Hooker & Arn. and T. officinale Weber	Oiten, oitá, oitáoi, oi’tá	Dandelion	Flowers, leaves and roots	Direct consumption	Food	Beauvoir (1998)
Usnea magellanica (Mont.) Motyka	Ánhuel, anhól, ánjôl	Old's man beard	Whole plant	As towel	Hygiene	Martínez-Crovetto (1968)
