= Escallonia 'Iveyi' =

Shrub cultivar

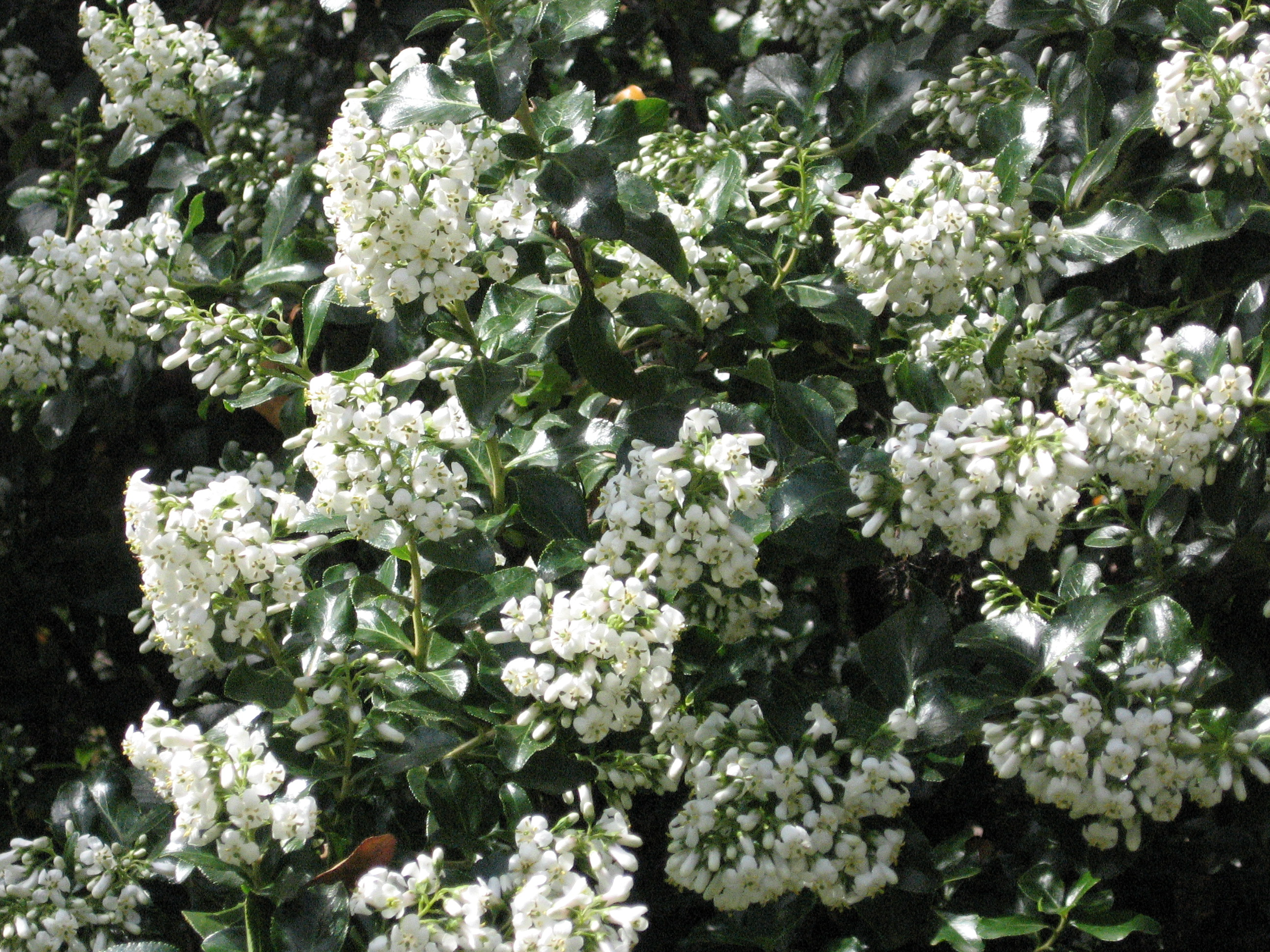
- Genus: Escallonia
- Cultivar: 'Iveyi'
- Origin: Caerhays Castle, Cornwall

Escallonia 'Iveyi' is a hybrid cultivar planted as a garden ornamental. The cultivar originated as a natural hybrid seedling discovered in the garden of Caerhays Castle in Cornwall. The cultivar was named for the Caerhays estate's gardener, David Ivey, by Edgar Thurston in his book British & foreign trees and shrubs in Cornwall. Thurston believed it to be a hybrid of E. montevidensis and E. × exonensis (E. rosea × E. rubra)., whereas others later adjudged the female parent to be E. bifida. The shrub was accorded the Royal Horticultural Society's Award of Merit in 1926, and the Award of Garden Merit in 1993.

== Description ==
'Iveyi' is an evergreen shrub growing to between 1.5 and 2.5 m high, with a similar spread, bearing glossy dark green foliage. Panicles of white flowers appear in the summer.

== Cultivation ==
The cultivar prefers a moist well-drained soil and a sunny or partly shaded situation. Propagation is from semi-mature cuttings of the current season's growth.
