= Phthirusa pyrifolia =

Scientific classification
- Kingdom: Plantae
- Clade: Tracheophytes
- Clade: Angiosperms
- Clade: Eudicots
- Order: Santalales
- Family: Loranthaceae
- Genus: Phthirusa
- Species: P. pyrifolia

Binomial name
- Phthirusa pyrifolia (Kunth) Eichler

Synonyms
- Loranthus affinis Mart. ex Schult.f.; Loranthus hoffmannseggianus Schult.f.; Loranthus pyrifolius Kunth; Loranthus subcampestris Mart. ex Schult.f.; Passovia pyrifolia (Kunth) Tiegh.; Phoradendron gentlei Trel.; Phthirusa heterophylla Rusby; Phthirusa pyrifolia var. terminalis J.F.Macbr.; Struthanthus minutiflorus Lundell; Struthanthus platycladus (Ule) Baehni & J.F.Macbr.; Struthanthus pyrifolius (Kunth) G.Don; Struthanthus pyrifolius var. terminalis (J.F.Macbr.) J.F.Macbr.

Species of plant

Phthirusa pyrifolia is a subtropical flowering plant species of the family Loranthaceae. It grows in forests from Mexico through Central America, Peru, Bolivia, and Brazil. It flowers and fruits year-round; its small berries range in color from orange to deep red when ripe.

Phthirusa pyrifolia is used medicinally by people in parts of the Peruvian Amazon.
