= Cinchona villosa =

Scientific classification
- Kingdom: Plantae
- Clade: Tracheophytes
- Clade: Angiosperms
- Clade: Eudicots
- Clade: Asterids
- Order: Gentianales
- Family: Rubiaceae
- Genus: Cinchona
- Species: C. villosa

Binomial name
- Cinchona villosa Pav. ex Lindl.

Synonyms
- Cinchona humboldtiana Lamb.; Quinquina humboldtiana (Lamb.) Kuntze; Cinchona conglomerata Pav.; Cinchona humboldtiana var. conglomerata (Pav.) Wedd.; Cinchona villosa Pav. ex Lamb.

Species of flowering plant

Cinchona villosa is a species of flowering plant in the family Rubiaceae. It is a shrub or tree with papery leaves and capsule fruits. The species is native to South America, and was described in 1838.

== Taxonomy ==
Cinchona villosa was first validly published in 1838 by John Lindley, following an invalid publication by José Antonio Pavón Jiménez.

== Distribution ==
Cinchona villosa is native to the wet tropical biome of Bolivia, Ecuador, and Peru.

== Description ==
Cinchona villosa is a shrub or tree that grows up to 18 metres (59 ft) tall. The leaves are papery when dry, elliptical to ovate or obovate, 6.5–19 centimetres (2.6–7.5 in) long, and 0.3–0.8 centimetres (0.12–0.31 in) wide. The leaves have domatia. The leaf stems are 1–2.2 centimetres (0.39–0.87 in) long.

The calyx is 2–2.1 millimetres (0.079–0.083 in) long, and has triangular, 0.5–0.9 millimetres (0.020–0.035 in) long lobes. The corolla tube is around 6.1 millimetres (0.24 in) long.

The fruit is a dehiscent, 5–14 millimetres (0.20–0.55 in) long, 3–7 millimetres (0.12–0.28 in) wide capsule. The endocarp is papery, and around 0.15 millimetres (0.0059 in) thick. The seeds are irregularly elliptical, 4–6.4 millimetres (0.16–0.25 in) long, and 1.7–2.1 millimetres (0.067–0.083 in) wide.

Cinchona villosa is similar to Cinchona glandulifera.
