= Escallonia angustifolia =

Scientific classification
- Kingdom: Plantae
- Clade: Tracheophytes
- Clade: Angiosperms
- Clade: Eudicots
- Clade: Asterids
- Order: Escalloniales
- Family: Escalloniaceae
- Genus: Escallonia
- Species: E. angustifolia

Binomial name
- Escallonia angustifolia C. Presl

Synonyms
- Escallonia angustifolia var. coquimbensis (J. Rémy) Acevedo & Kausel; Escallonia coquimbensis J. Rémy; Escallonia coquimbensis var. salicifolia Reiche; Escallonia graefiana Hosseus

Species of tree

Escallonia angustifolia is an evergreen shrub or treelet in the Escalloniaceae family, native to Argentina, Chile and southern Peru. It occurs at elevations between 1,500–2,800 metres (4,900–9,200 ft) above sea level.
