= Cyperus niger =

Black flatsedge

Scientific classification
- Kingdom: Plantae
- Clade: Tracheophytes
- Clade: Angiosperms
- Clade: Monocots
- Clade: Commelinids
- Order: Poales
- Family: Cyperaceae
- Genus: Cyperus
- Species: C. niger

Binomial name
- Cyperus niger Ruiz y Pavón

Synonyms
- Cyperus melanostachyus Kunth; Pycreus niger (Ruiz & Pav.) Cufod.; Cyperus variegatus Kunth; Cyperus adustus J.Presl & C.Presl; Cyperus cimicinus J.Presl & C.Presl; Cyperus longicruris Boeckeler; Cyperus lorentzianus Boeckeler; Cyperus intricatoramosus Boeckeler; Cyperus pergracilis Boeckeler; Chlorocyperus cimicinus (J.Presl & C.Presl) Rikli; Chlorocyperus melanostachyus (Kunth) Rikli; Cyperus biradiatus Boeckeler

Species of plant

Cyperus niger is a species of sedge known by the common name black flatsedge. This plant is native to the Americas, where it can be found in wet areas from South and Central America to the southwestern United States, from California and Oklahoma south to Argentina.

Cyperus niger is a perennial herb with small, wispy rhizomes. There may be a few long, thin leaves around the base of the plant. The thin stems often grow bunched together and may reach half a meter in height. The inflorescence contains a few to over 20 spikelets, each under a centimeter long, flat, and containing usually fewer than ten flowers. Each flower is covered by an oval-shaped dark brown or greenish bract. The fruit is a discoid achene just over a millimeter long.

== See also ==
- List of Cyperus species
