= Guatteria glauca =

Guatteria glauca is a taxon synonym for two species of flowering plants:

- Guatteria glauca (Hassk.) Miq., a synonym of Maasia glauca (Hassk.) Mols, Kessler & Rogstad
- Guatteria glauca Ruiz & Pav., a synonym of Guatteria punctata (Aubl.) R.A.Howard
