= Solanum albidum =

Scientific classification
- Kingdom: Plantae
- Clade: Tracheophytes
- Clade: Angiosperms
- Clade: Eudicots
- Clade: Asterids
- Order: Solanales
- Family: Solanaceae
- Genus: Solanum
- Subgenus: Solanum subg. Leptostemonum
- Section: Solanum sect. Torva
- Species: S. albidum

Binomial name
- Solanum albidum Dunal, 1813

Synonyms
- Solanum incanum Ruiz & Pav.

Species of plant

Solanum albidum is a species of nightshade that is native to western South America, from southern Ecuador to northern Argentina, and grows well at mid elevations in the Andes. Common names include lumo (Ecuador) huaritar (Peru) and lavaplato plateado (Bolivia). It can be either a shrub or small tree. The plant has dull yellow berries 0.8–1.5 cm (0.31–0.59 in) in diameter.
