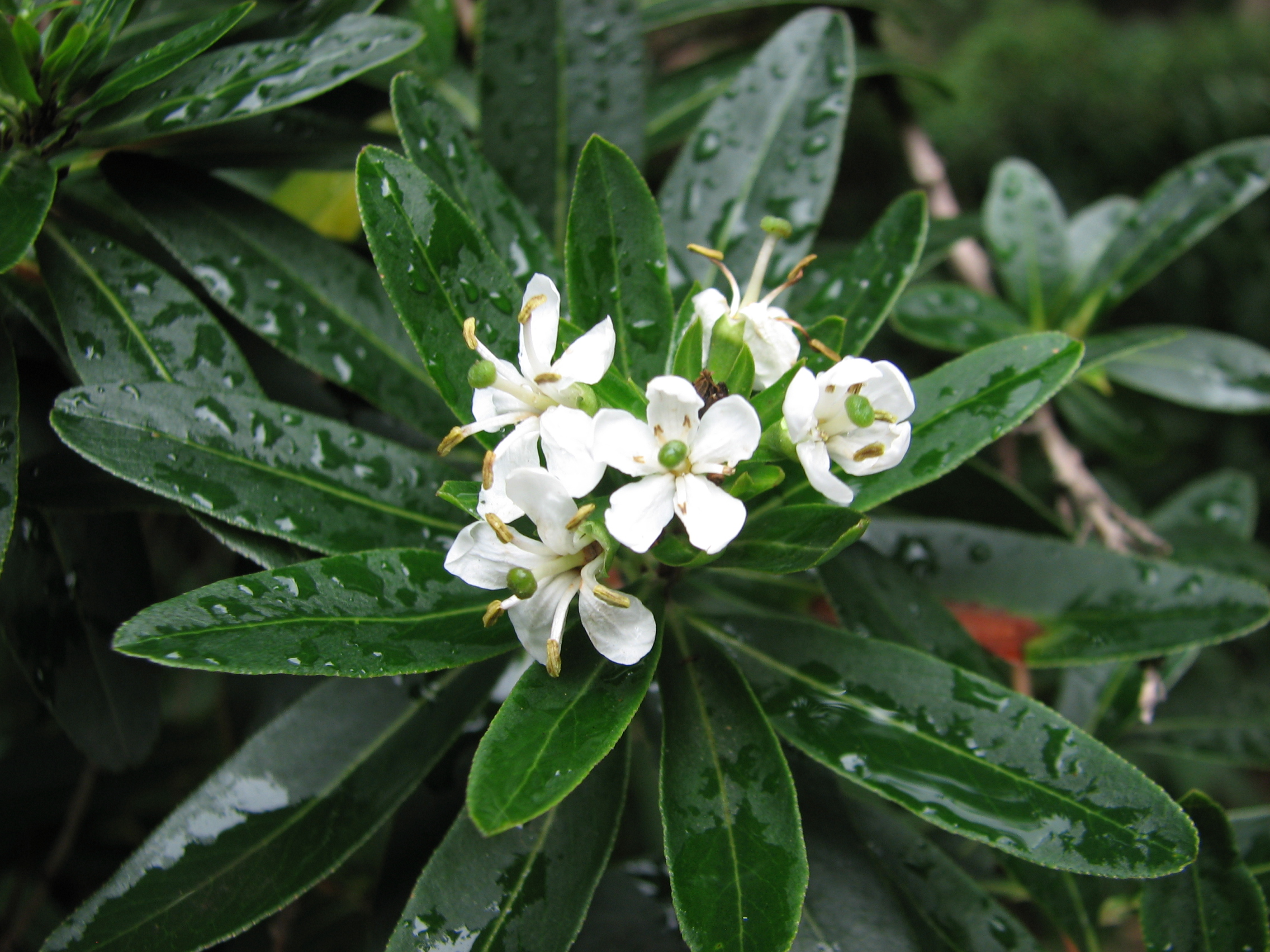

Scientific classification
- Kingdom: Plantae
- Clade: Tracheophytes
- Clade: Angiosperms
- Clade: Eudicots
- Clade: Asterids
- Order: Escalloniales
- Family: Escalloniaceae
- Genus: Escallonia
- Species: E. bifida

Binomial name
- Escallonia bifida Link & Otto

Synonyms
- Escallonia floribunda var. montevidensis Cham. & Schltdl. Escallonia montevidensis (Cham. & Schltdl.) DC.

= Escallonia bifida =

Species of flowering plant

Escallonia bifida, the cloven gum box, is an evergreen shrub or small tree in the family Escalloniaceae. It is native to Brazil and Uruguay.

It can grow up to 4 m (13 ft) high and 2.5 m (8.2 ft) broad, and has dark green shiny leaves which are 2 to 7 cm long and 0.8 to 2 cm wide. The pure white flowers, initially tubular but then spreading, appear in summer.

It is sparingly naturalised in New South Wales in Australia. It is found in cultivation in mild coastal regions of the UK (hardy down to −5 °C (23 °F), where its dense habit makes it suitable for tall hedging. In colder areas it requires the protection of a wall. It has gained the Royal Horticultural Society's Award of Garden Merit.

The Latin specific epithet bifida means "cleft in two".
