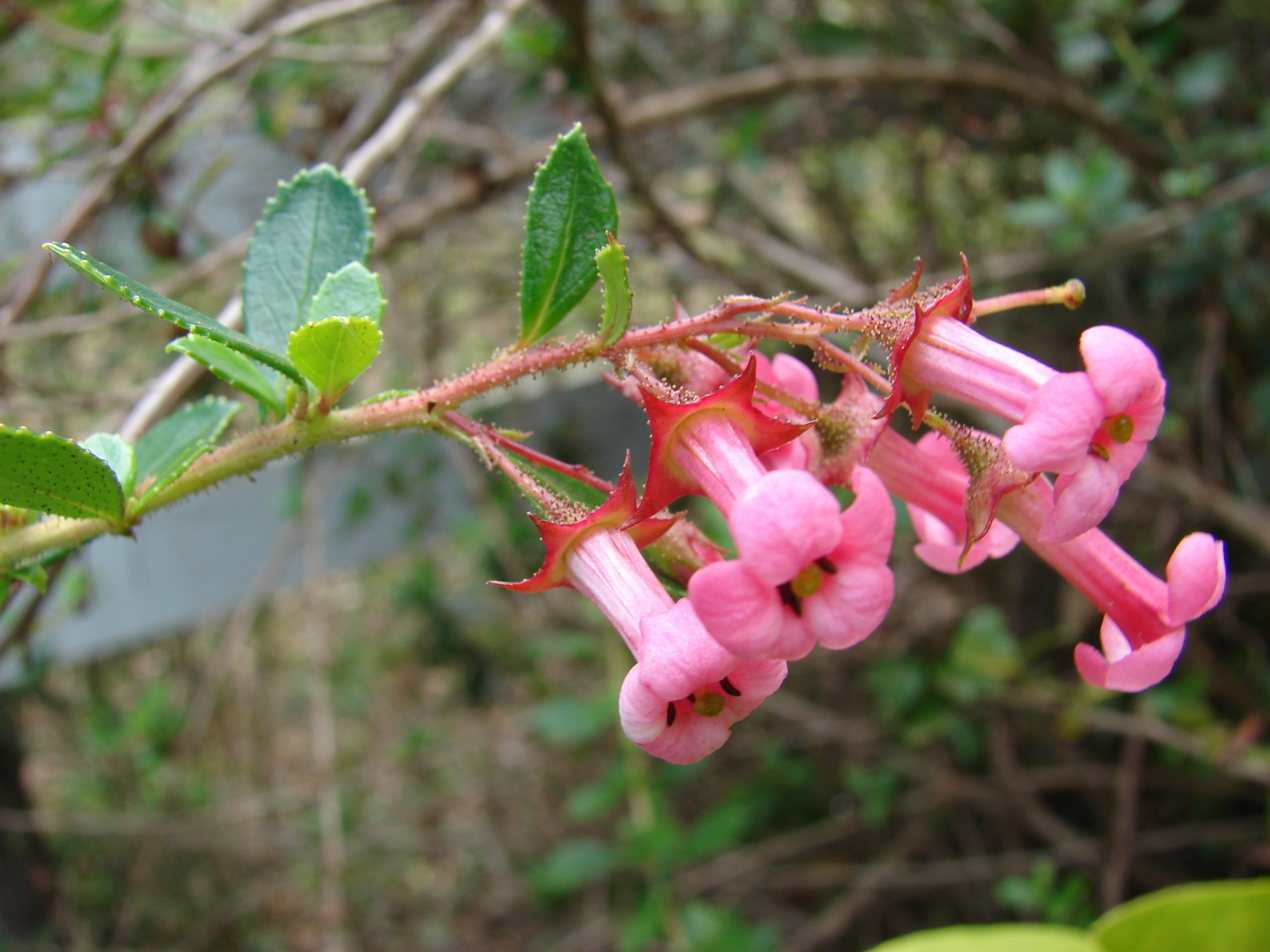
- Escallonia rubra var. macrantha

Scientific classification
- Kingdom: Plantae
- Clade: Tracheophytes
- Clade: Angiosperms
- Clade: Eudicots
- Clade: Asterids
- Order: Escalloniales
- Family: Escalloniaceae
- Genus: Escallonia
- Species: E. rubra

Binomial name
- Escallonia rubra (Ruiz & Pav.) Pers.

Synonyms
- Escallonia commutata Regel; Escallonia concinna Phil.; Escallonia dumetorum Phil.; Escallonia duplicato-serrata Remy; Escallonia duplicatoserrata Remy; Escallonia glandulosa Lodd.; Escallonia glandulosa Sm.; Escallonia ingrami Hort.; Escallonia littoralis Phil.; Escallonia littoralis var. concinna (Phil.) Reiche; Escallonia macrantha var. duplicato-serrata (J.Rémy) Engl.; Escallonia macrantha var. duplicatoserrata (J.Rémy) Engl.; Escallonia mollis Phil.; Escallonia poeppigiana DC.; Escallonia poeppigiana var. longifolia DC.; Escallonia punctata DC.; Escallonia rahmeri Phil.; Escallonia rahmeri var. obovata Speg.; Escallonia rubra var. concinna (Phil.) Reiche; Escallonia rubra var. dumetorum (Phil.) Acevedo & Kausel; Escallonia rubra var. glabriuscula Hook. & Arn.; Escallonia rubra var. multiflora Poepp. & Endl.; Escallonia rubra var. poeppigiana (DC.) Engl.; Escallonia rubra var. poeppigiana (DC.) Reiche; Escallonia rubra var. pubescens Hook. & Arn.; Escallonia rubra var. punctata (DC.) Hook.fil.; Escallonia rubra var. rubra; Escallonia rubra var. uniflora Poepp. & Endl.; Escallonia sanguinea Hort.Veitch.; Escallonia sanguinea Hort.Veitch. ex Mast.; Stereoxylon rubrum Ruiz & Pav.

= Escallonia rubra =

Species of flowering plant

Escallonia rubra, called redclaws and red escallonia, is a species of flowering plant in the family Escalloniaceae. It is native to southern Chile and neighboring areas of Argentina.

== Description ==
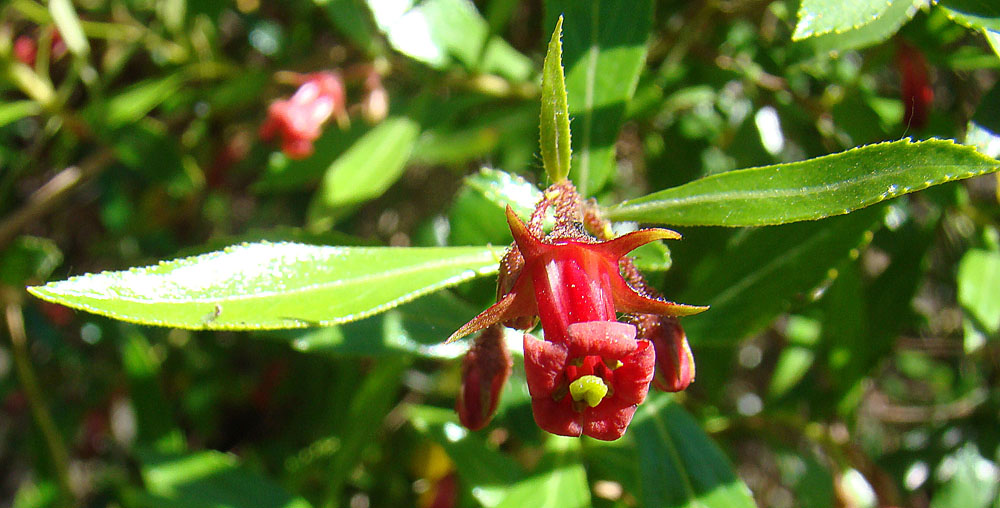
A variety with narrower leaves and redder petals

Escallonia rubra is a spreading shrub usually 0.8 to 1.0 m tall, but can reach a height of 3.6 m. It features glossy, elliptical, serrate evergreen leaves. The upper side is glossy and dark green, while the lower side is much lighter. The bark is first red and rough-haired, which later turns brown and dotted, and eventually gray and cracked. The buds are scattered and oval with finely serrated edge on the outer half. The root system is stringy and somewhat weak in the first years. Later, strong main roots are formed, which lie high in the ground.

The pink to crimson trumpet-shaped flowers bloom in July to October in the Northern Hemisphere. The prominent, maroon to red hypanthia are campanulate with acute apices, leading to the common name redclaws. The flowers sit in short clusters from the leaf corners. The petals are fused into a short tube. The fruits are capsules.

== Occurrence ==
The shrub occurs on the slopes of the Andes Mountains in southern Chile and Argentina all the way down to Tierra del Fuego, where it grows in scrub and open forest, among other biomes.

== Cultivation ==
Cultivated as a garden and hedging plant, it has become naturalized in western Europe, Oregon in the United States, and New Zealand, and is considered invasive in places. It is grown in many other areas, such as Australia. Its cultivar 'Crimson Spire' has gained the Royal Horticultural Society's Award of Garden Merit.

== Varieties ==
A number of varieties have been described, some of which may still be accepted, depending on the authority.

- E. rubra var. albiflora Hosseus
- E. rubra var. albiflora Poepp. & Endl.
- E. rubra var. dumetorum (Phil.) Acevedo & Kausel
- E. rubra var. glutinosa Reiche
- E. rubra var. macrantha Reiche
- E. rubra var. thalassica Kausel
