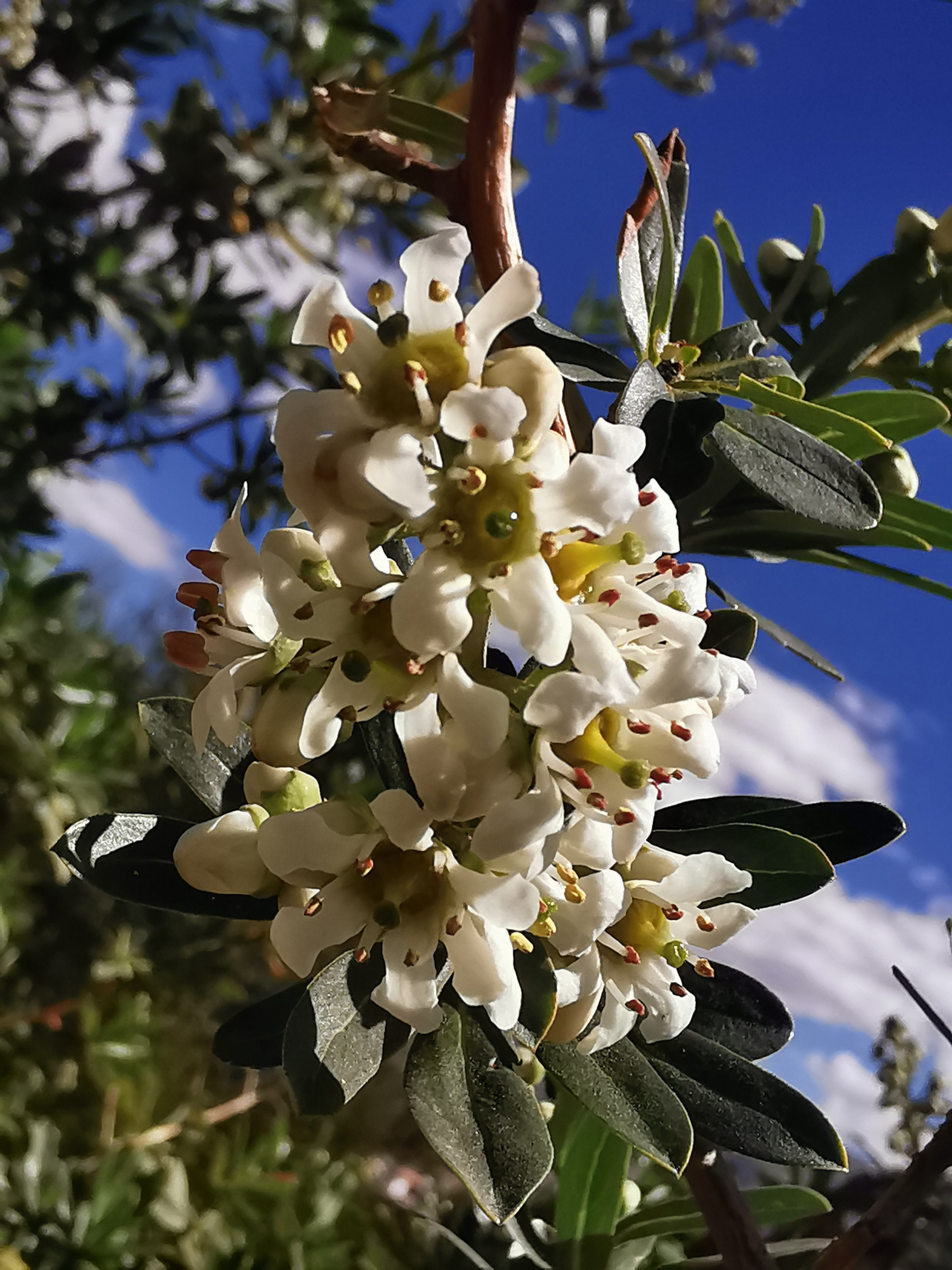

Conservation status
- Near Threatened (IUCN 3.1)

Scientific classification
- Kingdom: Plantae
- Clade: Tracheophytes
- Clade: Angiosperms
- Clade: Eudicots
- Clade: Asterids
- Order: Escalloniales
- Family: Escalloniaceae
- Genus: Escallonia
- Species: E. resinosa

Binomial name
- Escallonia resinosa (Ruiz & Pav.) Pers.

Synonyms
- Stereoxylon resinosum Ruiz & Pav.; Escallonia cuneifolia (Ruiz & Pav.) F.Dietr.; Escallonia mandonii Rusby; Escallonia mandonii var. microphylla Herzog; Escallonia multiflora C.Presl; Stereoxylon cuneifolium Ruiz & Pav.

= Escallonia resinosa =

Species of tree

Escallonia resinosa is a species of evergreen shrub or tree in the family Escalloniaceae. It is native to the Andean forests of Peru, Bolivia and southern Ecuador from 2600 to 4200 meters above sea level. A component of high Andean forests, it is regarded as an important source of raw materials for the Andean peoples.

== Description ==
Escallonia resinosa grows as a shrub or tree from 2 to 10 m in height. The trunk has an irregular shape and is often twisted, with a reddish papery bark. Leaves are simple and spirally arranged, often clustered at the end of the branchlets, oblanceolate, 2–3.5 cm long, 0.5–0.7 cm wide, with a finely dentate margin. Flowers are white, small (ca. 1 cm long), and borne in racemes or panicles.

== Distribution and habitat ==
Escallonia resinosa is found in the Andes, from southern Ecuador to Peru and Bolivia, between 2600 and 4200 m of elevation. It is found in seasonally dry montane forests of mountain slopes, often growing in association with trees of genera Polylepis and Buddleja.

== Uses ==
Escallonia resinosa is a source of firewood and wood of good quality throughout its range. This tree species furnishes a hard wood for tools and is often used to manufacture chaquitacllas (a tool used for soil plowing) by the indigenous peoples of the Andes since ancient times. The wood was also probably used by the Incas to make a type of ceremonial vases called kero. Leaves are used as a source of a beige color dye applied to cotton and wool.
