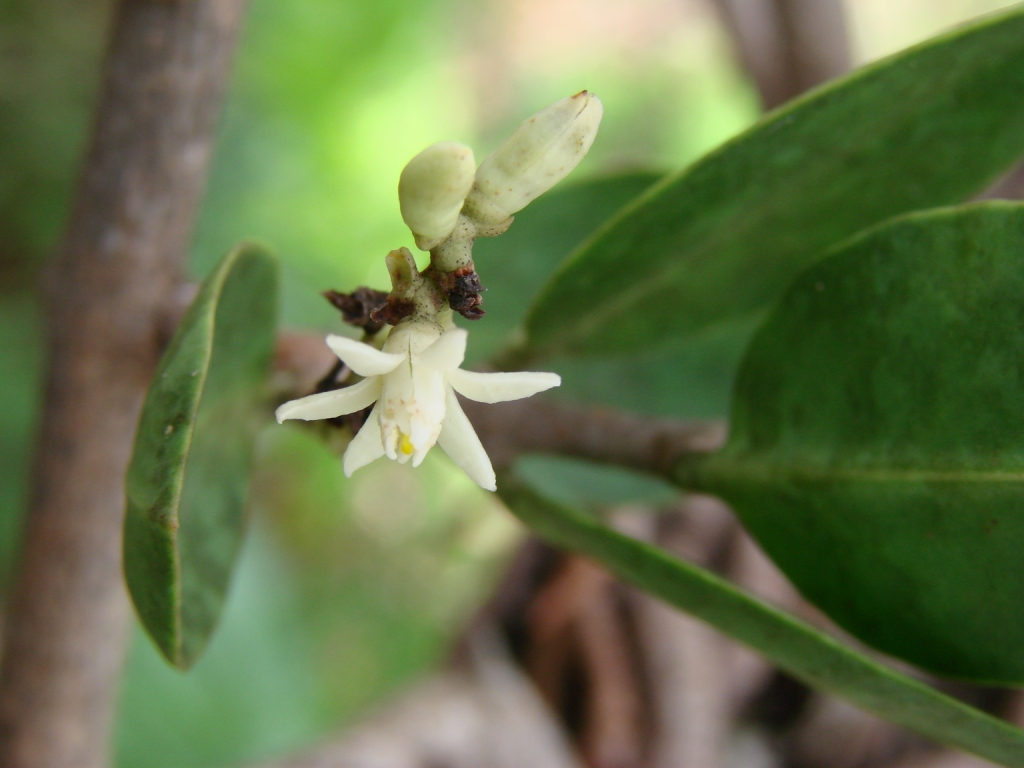
- P. ovata

Scientific classification
- Kingdom: Plantae
- Clade: Tracheophytes
- Clade: Angiosperms
- Clade: Eudicots
- Order: Santalales
- Family: Loranthaceae
- Genus: Phthirusa; Mart.

Species
- See text

= Phthirusa =

Genus of mistletoes

Phthirusa is a South American genus of parasitic shrubs in the family Loranthaceae.

== Species ==
- Phthirusa bisexualis Rizzini
- Phthirusa delicatula Rizzini
- Phthirusa disjectifolia (Rizzini) Kuijt
- Phthirusa elliptica Rizzini
- Phthirusa guyanensis Eichler
- Phthirusa janeirensis Eichler
- Phthirusa lobaterae G.Ferrari
- Phthirusa murcae Rizzini
- Phthirusa nitens (Mart.) Eichler
- Phthirusa pedicularis Rizzini
- Phthirusa podoptera (Cham. & Schltdl.) Kuijt
- Phthirusa pycnostachya Eichler
- Phthirusa pyrifolia (Kunth) Eichler
- Phthirusa rhynchophylla (Kuijt) Kuijt
- Phthirusa rufa (Mart.) Eichler
- Phthirusa salicifolia (Mart.) G. Don
- Phthirusa schneeana G.Ferrari
- Phthirusa stelis (L.) Kuijt
- Phthirusa stenophylla Eichler
- Phthirusa steyermarkiana Rizzini
- Phthirusa subcorymbosa Rizzini
- Phthirusa trichoides Rizzini
