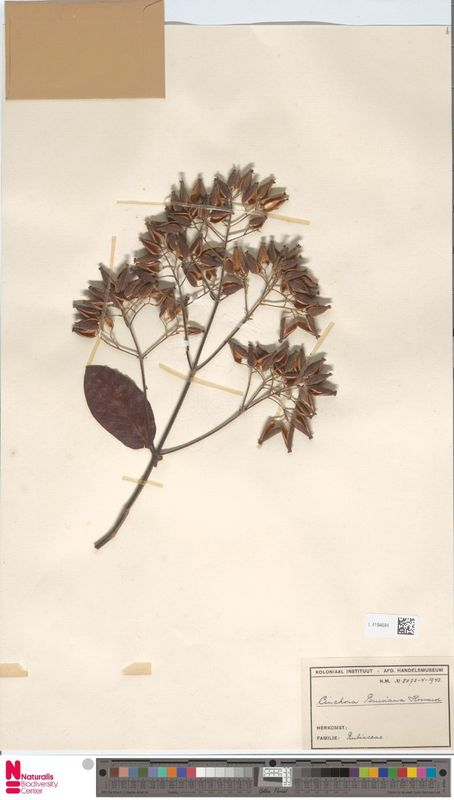

Conservation status
- Critically Endangered (IUCN 3.1)

Scientific classification
- Kingdom: Plantae
- Clade: Embryophytes
- Clade: Tracheophytes
- Clade: Angiosperms
- Clade: Eudicots
- Clade: Asterids
- Order: Gentianales
- Family: Rubiaceae
- Genus: Cinchona
- Species: C. glandulifera

Binomial name
- Cinchona glandulifera Ruiz & Pav.

Synonyms
- Cinchona glandulosa Ruiz & Pav. ex Triana; Cinchona undulata Pav. ex Howard

= Cinchona glandulifera =

Species of flowering plant

Cinchona glandulifera is a species of flowering plant in the family Rubiaceae. It is a shrub or tree with papery leaves, and dehiscent capsule fruits. The species is native to Peru.

Cinchona glandulifera was described in 1802, and is listed as Critically Endangered by the IUCN.

== Taxonomy ==
The species was described by Hipólito Ruiz López and José Antonio Pavón Jiménez in 1802.

== Distribution ==
Cinchona glandulifera is native to the wet tropical biome of east-central Peru. It grows at elevations of 1,000–3,500 metres (3,300–11,500 ft).

== Description ==
Cinchona glandulifera is a shrub or tree.

The leaves are thinly papery when dry, 9.1–15 centimetres (3.6–5.9 in) long, 3.2–6.9 centimetres (1.3–2.7 in) wide, and ovate, elliptical, or more or less oblong in shape. The leaves have domatia. The leaf stems are 3–7 millimetres (0.12–0.28 in) long.

The calyx is 1.6–2.1 millimetres (0.063–0.083 in) long, and has triangular lobes, which are 0.5–0.9 millimetres (0.020–0.035 in) long. The corolla is a 5.2–5.6 millimetres (0.20–0.22 in) long tube, which has 2–2.5 millimetres (0.079–0.098 in) long lobes.

The fruit is a dehiscent capsule, which is 5–12 millimetres (0.20–0.47 in) long, and 4–5 millimetres (0.16–0.20 in) wide. The endocarp is papery. The seeds are irregularly elliptical, 3.2–5.6 millimetres (0.13–0.22 in) long, and 1.2–1.7 millimetres (0.047–0.067 in) wide.

Cinchona glandulifera is similar to Cinchona villosa.

== Conservation ==
In 2022, the IUCN assessed Cinchona glandulifera as Critically Endangered.

== Nomenclature ==
In Spanish, the species is known as Crespilla Chica, Cascarilla del Pajonal, Cascarilla Negrilla, or Cascarilla Delgada.
