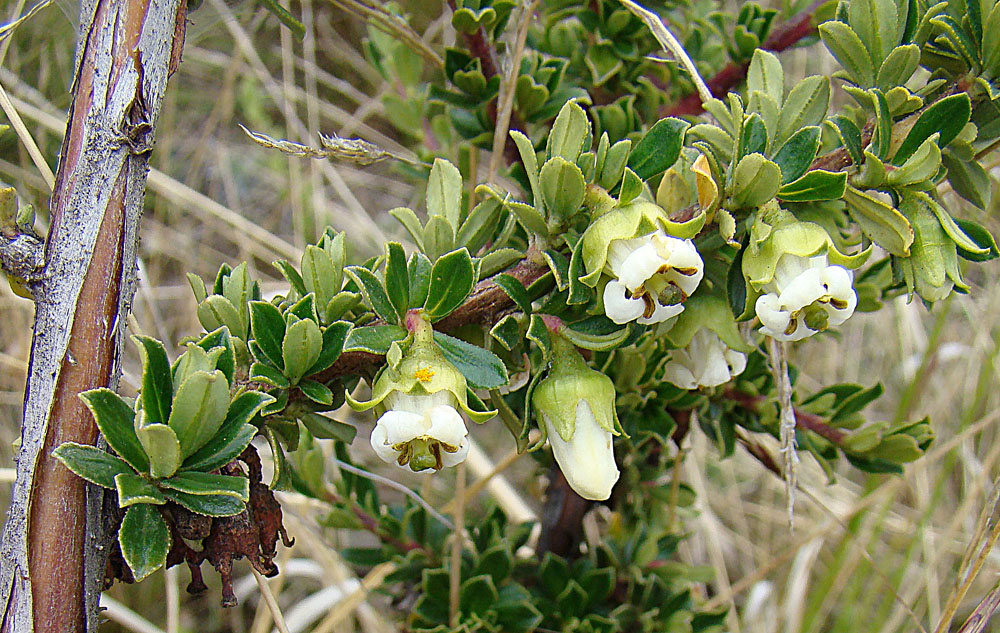
- Branchlet with leaves and flowers

Scientific classification
- Kingdom: Plantae
- Clade: Tracheophytes
- Clade: Angiosperms
- Clade: Eudicots
- Clade: Asterids
- Order: Escalloniales
- Family: Escalloniaceae
- Genus: Escallonia
- Species: E. myrtilloides

Binomial name
- Escallonia myrtilloides L.f.

Synonyms
- Escallonia adscendens Rusby; Escallonia corymbosa (Ruiz & Pav.) Pers.; Escallonia hypsophila Diels; Escallonia myrtilloides var. myrtilloides; Stereoxylon corymbosum Ruiz & Pav.

= Escallonia myrtilloides =

Species of tree

Escallonia myrtilloides is an evergreen shrub or tree in the Escalloniaceae family, native to open montane wet forests and paramos from Costa Rica to Bolivia. It occurs at elevations between 1,900 and 4,200 metres (6,200 and 13,800 feet).

== Description ==
Trees or shrubs from 2–6 metres (6 ft 7 in – 19 ft 8 in) high, with irregular to conical shaped crown and branches growing almost horizontally, giving the tree the appearance of a Chinese pagoda. Leaves dark green, leathery, obovate, of 0.8–2.3 centimetres (0.31–0.91 in) long, 0.4–1 centimetre (0.16–0.39 in) wide; borne on short twigs. Inflorescences in corymbs of 1–1.5 centimetres (0.39–0.59 in) long; flowers greenish white to pale yellow; fruits green, ca. 0.6 centimetres (0.24 in) wide, with numerous seeds.

== Distribution and habitat ==
The species is found in high Andean wet forests, open areas and paramos, and is often dominant on rocky slopes.

== Uses ==
Escallonia myrtilloides furnishes a reddish wood, with resistance to tension and shocks and easy drying. Because of this, it is useful for fences and woodcrafts.

The tree has an ornamental quality due to its distinctive crown shape, and is also used for hedges.
