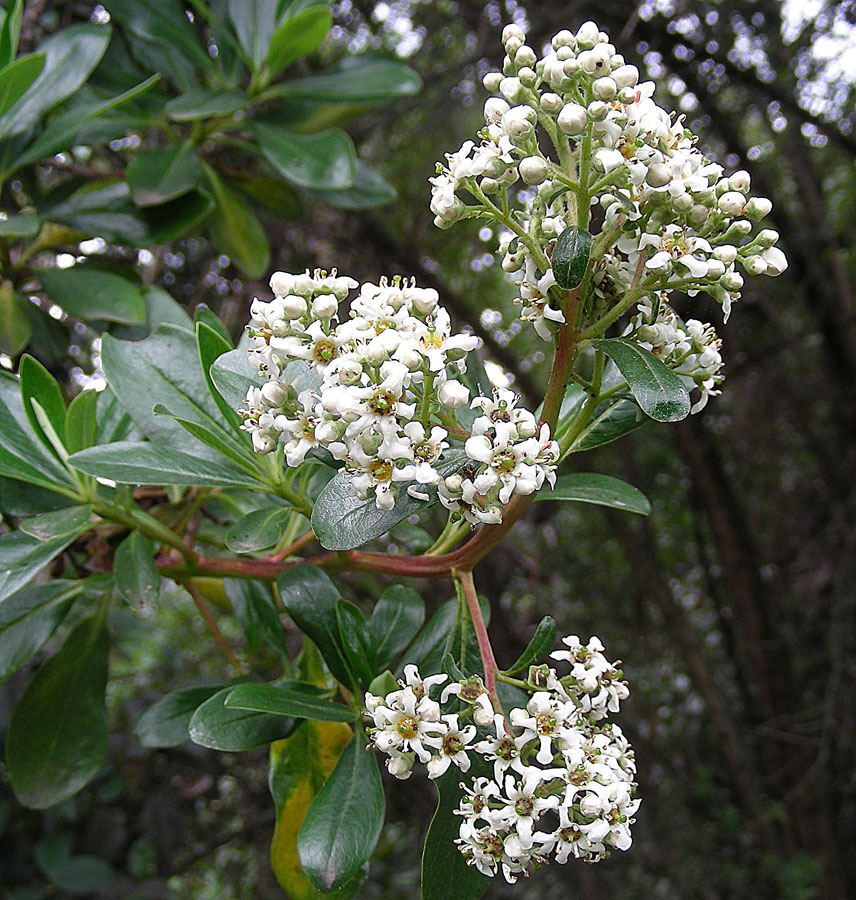
- Branchlet with inflorescence and leaves.

Conservation status
- Least Concern (IUCN 3.1)

Scientific classification
- Kingdom: Plantae
- Clade: Tracheophytes
- Clade: Angiosperms
- Clade: Eudicots
- Clade: Asterids
- Order: Escalloniales
- Family: Escalloniaceae
- Genus: Escallonia
- Species: E. paniculata

Binomial name
- Escallonia paniculata (Ruiz & Pav.) Schult.

Synonyms
- Stereoxylon paniculatum Ruiz & Pav.; Escallonia caracasana Kunth; Escallonia floribunda Kunth; Escallonia floribunda var. caracasana (Kunth) Engl.; Escallonia paniculata var. floribunda (Kunth) J.F.Macbr.; Escallonia pilgeriana Diels

= Escallonia paniculata =

Species of tree

Escallonia paniculata is a species of tree in the family Escalloniaceae. It is native to Costa Rica, Panama and South America.
