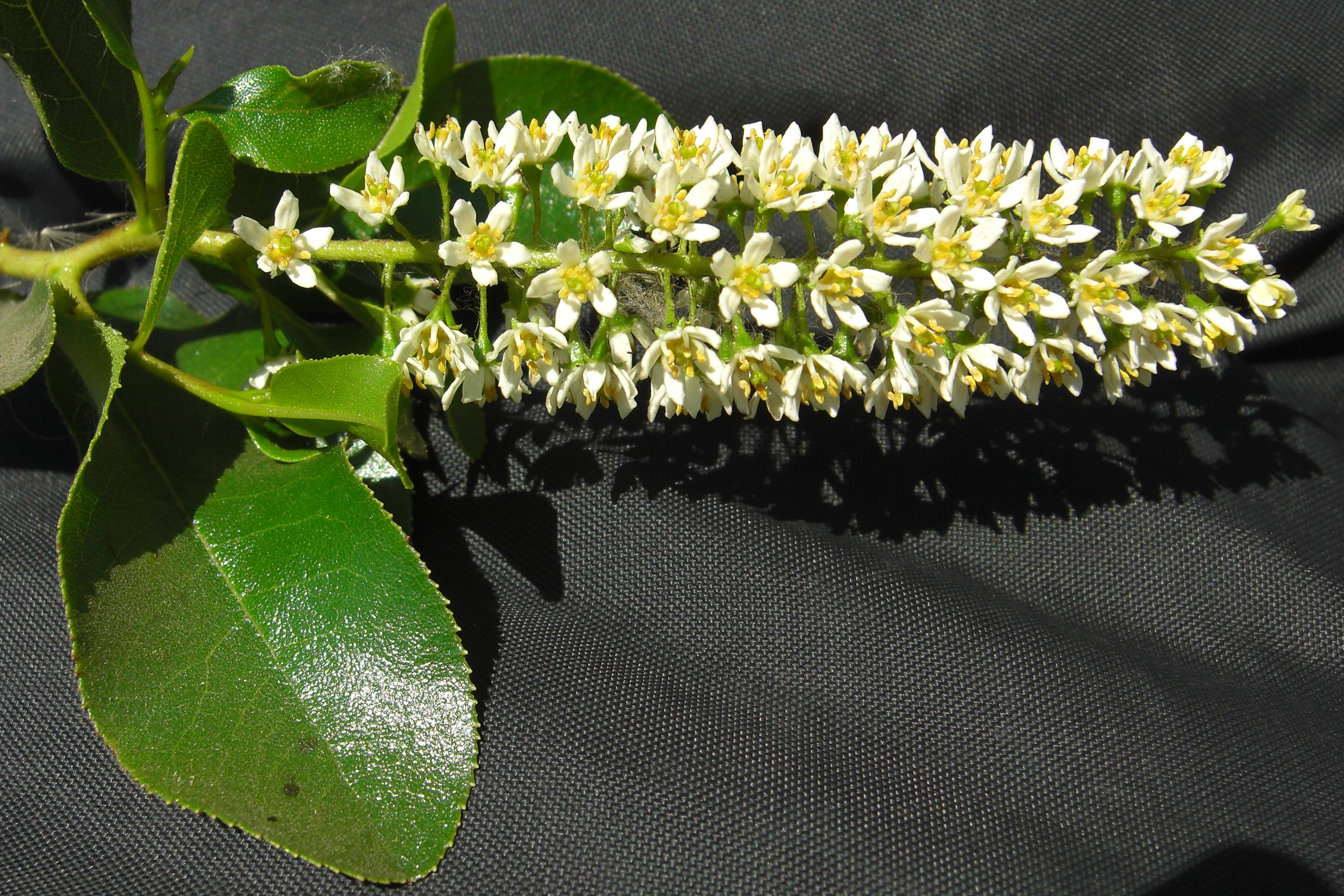
- Inflorescence and leaves

Conservation status
- Least Concern (IUCN 3.1)

Scientific classification
- Kingdom: Plantae
- Clade: Tracheophytes
- Clade: Angiosperms
- Clade: Eudicots
- Clade: Asterids
- Order: Escalloniales
- Family: Escalloniaceae
- Genus: Escallonia
- Species: E. pulverulenta

Binomial name
- Escallonia pulverulenta (Ruiz & Pav.) Pers.

Synonyms
- Stereoxylon pulverulentum Ruiz & Pav.; Escallonia berteroana DC.; Escallonia pulverulenta var. berteriana (DC.) Pamp.; Escallonia pulverulenta var. glabra Engl.; Escallonia pulverulenta var. resiniflua (Walp.) Pamp.; Escallonia resiniflua Walp.; Escallonia spinulosa Kunth ex Engl.

= Escallonia pulverulenta =

Species of flowering plant

Escallonia pulverulenta is a species of evergreen shrub in the family Escalloniaceae. It is endemic to the coastal and inner valleys of Central Chile, from 5–1,200 metres (16–3,937 ft) above sea level.
