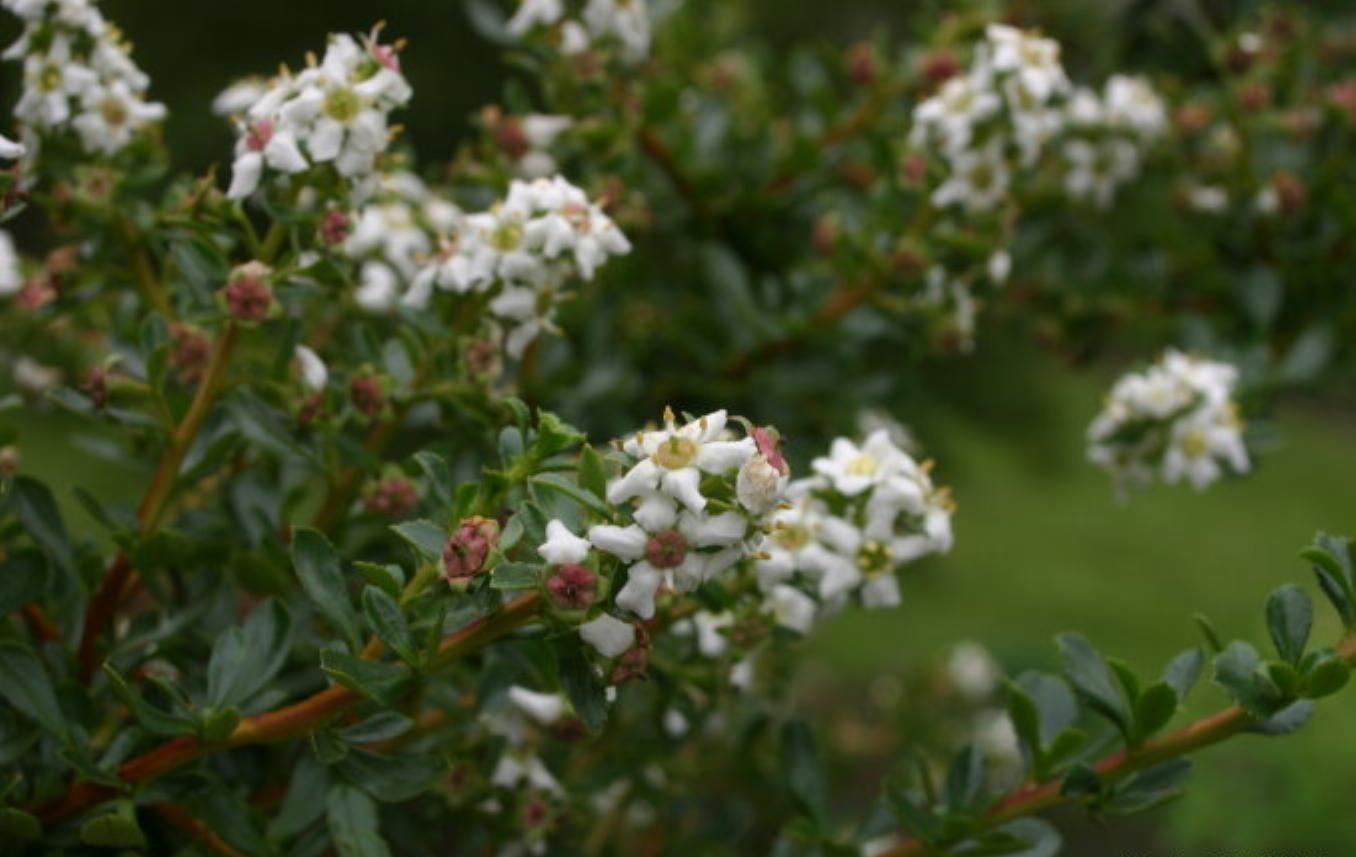
- Escallonia virgata

Scientific classification
- Kingdom: Plantae
- Clade: Tracheophytes
- Clade: Angiosperms
- Clade: Eudicots
- Clade: Asterids
- Order: Escalloniales
- Family: Escalloniaceae
- Genus: Escallonia; Mutis ex L.f.

Species
- See text

= Escallonia =

Genus of shrubs

Escallonia is a genus of shrubs and trees in the family Escalloniaceae. They are native to North and South America.

== Taxonomy ==
Currently valid species in Escallonia are:

- Escallonia alpina
- Escallonia angustifolia
- Escallonia bifida
- Escallonia callcottiae
- Escallonia chlorophylla
- Escallonia cordobensis
- Escallonia discolor
- Escallonia farinacea
- Escallonia florida
- Escallonia gayana
- Escallonia herrerae
- Escallonia hispida
- Escallonia hypoglauca
- Escallonia illinita
- Escallonia laevis
- Escallonia ledifolia
- Escallonia leucantha
- Escallonia megapotamica
- Escallonia micrantha
- Escallonia millegrana
- Escallonia myrtilloides
- Escallonia myrtoidea
- Escallonia obtusissima
- Escallonia paniculata
- Escallonia pendula
- Escallonia petrophila
- Escallonia piurensis
- Escallonia polifolia
- Escallonia pulverulenta
- Escallonia resinosa
- Escallonia reticulata
- Escallonia revoluta
- Escallonia rosea
- Escallonia rubra
- Escallonia salicifolia
- Escallonia schreiteri
- Escallonia serrata
- Escallonia tucumanensis
- Escallonia virgata

== Cultivation ==
Widely cultivated and commonly used as hedging plants, especially in coastal areas, Escallonias grow about 30 cm (12 in) per year, reaching 1.5–3 m (5–10 ft) in height, with arching branches of small, oval, glossy green leaves. Flowering from June to October (in the Northern Hemisphere), they have masses of small pink, white or crimson flowers, sometimes with a honey fragrance. They are best grown in full sun with some shelter. Some varieties are not fully hardy in all areas. Numerous cultivars and hybrids have been developed, of which the following have gained the Royal Horticultural Society's Award of Garden Merit:

- 'Apple Blossom' (pink)
- 'Donard Radiance' (rose red)
- 'Iveyi' (white)
- ' Langleyensis' (rose pink)
- 'Peach Blossom' (pink)
- 'Pride of Donard' (rose red)
- Escallonia bifida (white)
- Escallonia rubra 'Crimson Spire' (crimson)

== Gallery ==
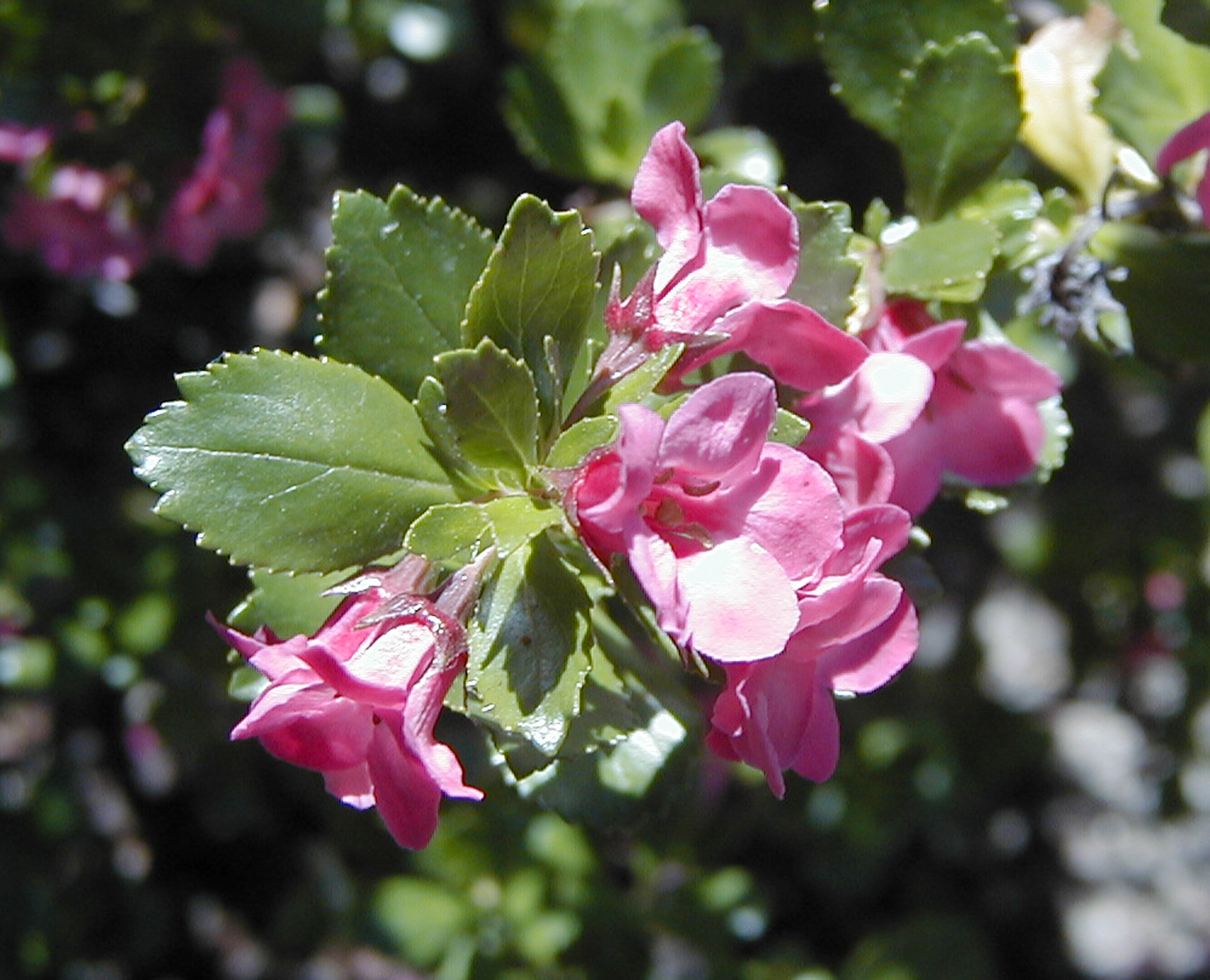
Escallonia macrantha

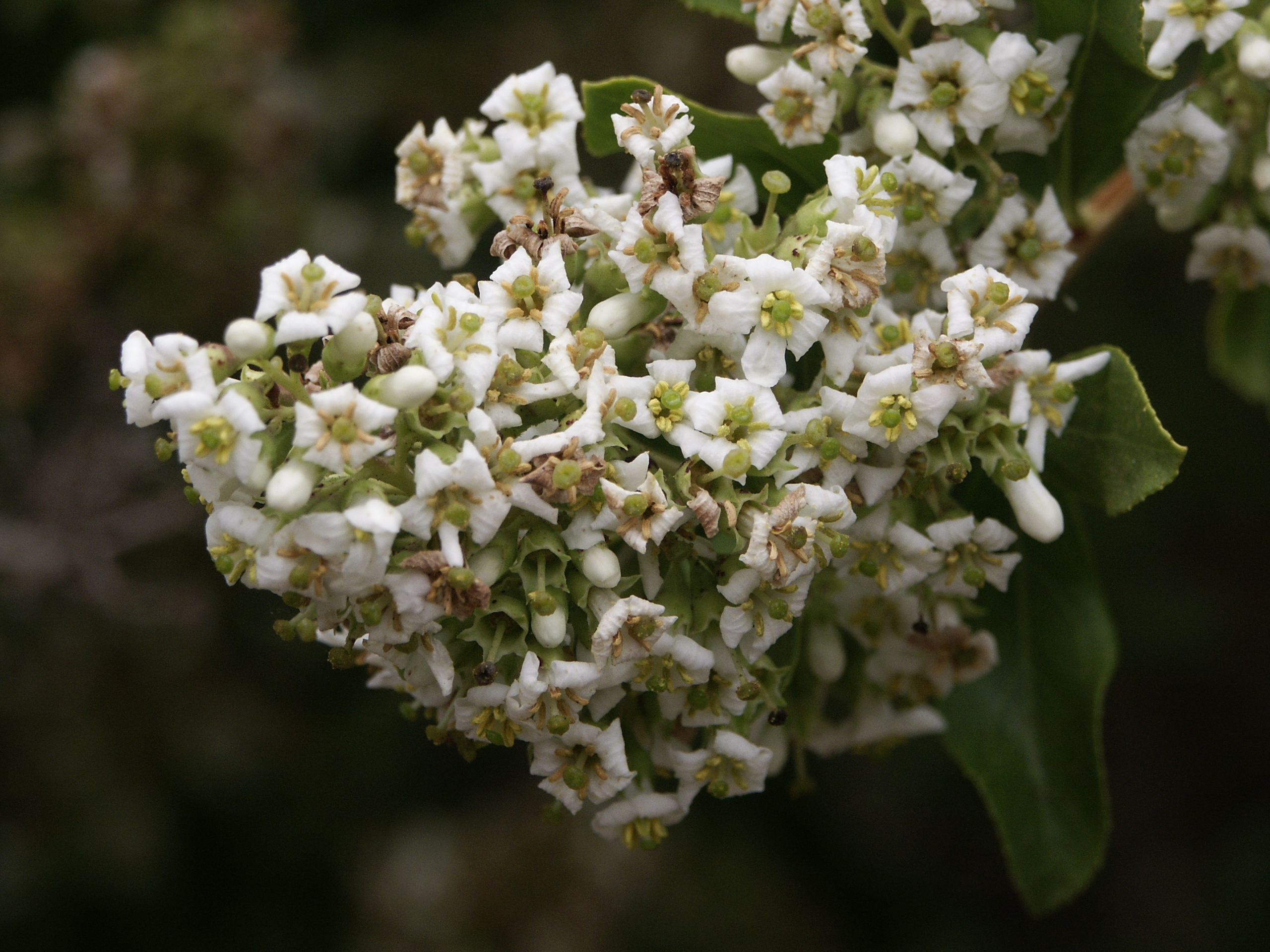
Escallonia myrtilloides

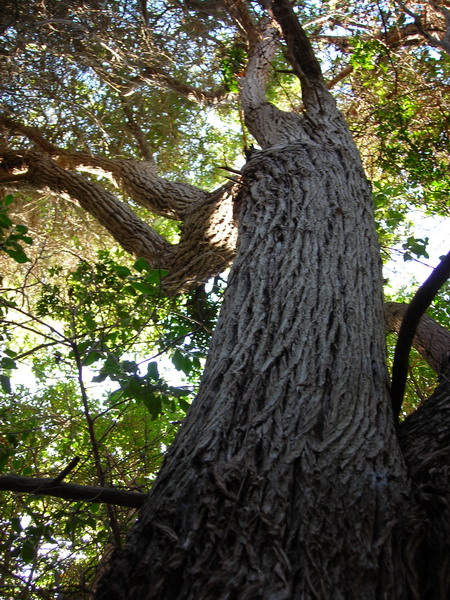
Escallonia revoluta

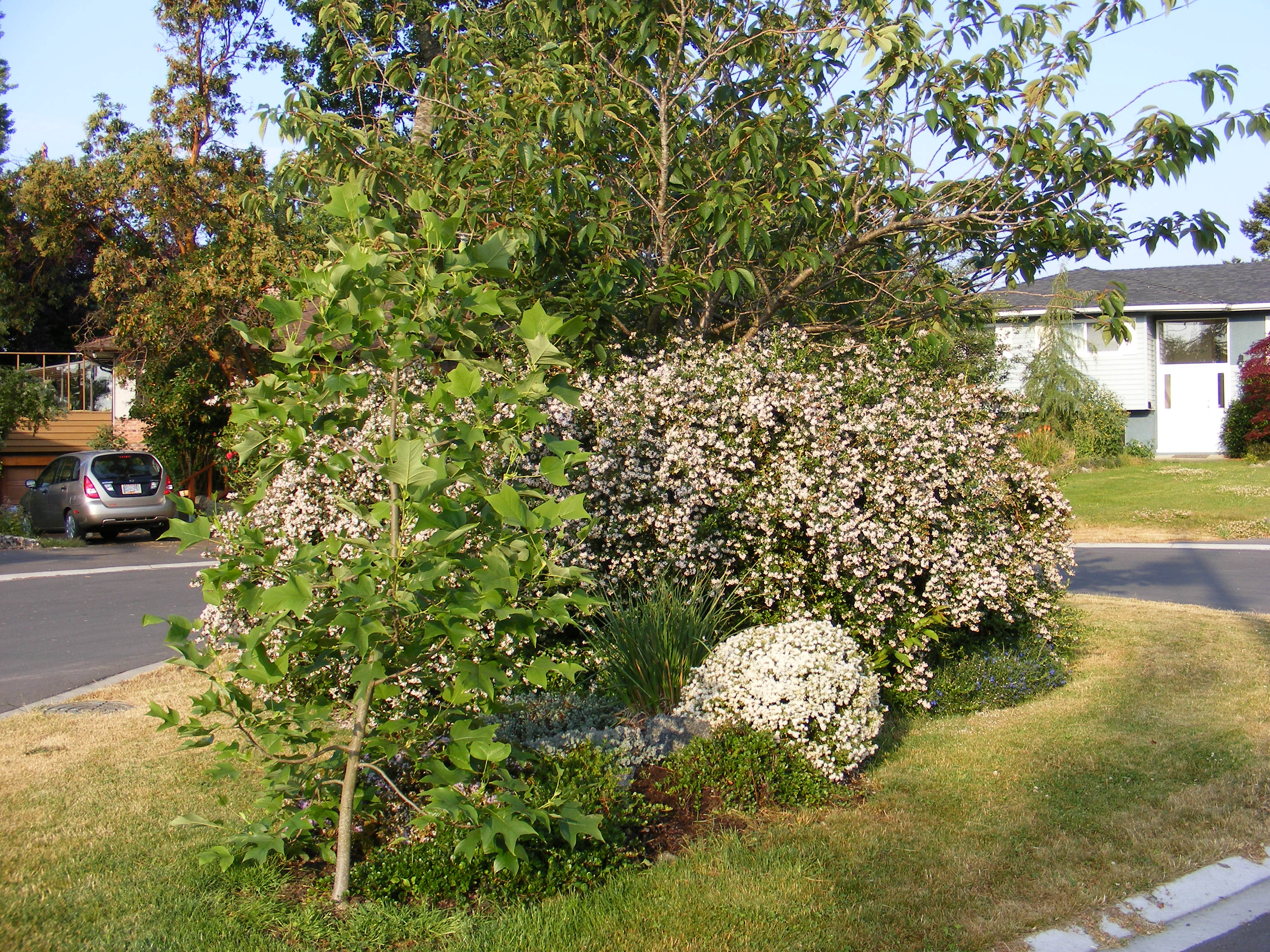
An Escallonia cultivar as a roadside planting
