= List of botanists by author abbreviation (A) =

This is an incomplete list of botanists by their author abbreviation, which is designed for citation with the botanical names or works that they have published. This list follows that established by Brummitt & Powell (1992). Use of that list is recommended by Rec. 46A Note 1 of the International Code of Nomenclature for algae, fungi, and plants. The list is kept up to date online at The International Plant Names Index and Index Fungorum.

In some cases an "author abbreviation" consists of a full surname, while in other cases the surname is abbreviated and/or accompanied by one or more initials. There is no space between the initials and the surname (or its abbreviation).

==== Order of entries ====
The list here is maintained strictly in order of the alphabetic characters in the abbreviation; thus "A.B.Jacks." appears under "A" not "J", and is located as if the characters were "ABJACKS". Capitalization is ignored as are all non-alphabetic characters such as "." and space. Diacritical marks are also ignored, so that, e.g., "ü" is treated as if it were "u".

==== Navigation ====
Because of its length, the list is split across separate pages. All alphabetic sections can be accessed from the short table of contents; the vertical bars show the page divisions. Searching will only find an entry within a page.

== A ==
Contents:	A	B	C	D	E F	G	H	I J	K L	M	N O	P	Q R	S	T U V	W X Y Z

- Aa – Hubertus Antonius van der Aa (1935–2017)
- A.A.Burb. – Andrew A. Burbidge (fl. 2016)
- A.A.Cocucci – Andrea A. Cocucci (born 1959)
- A.A.Eaton – Alvah Augustus Eaton (1865–1908)
- A.A.Fisch.Waldh. – Alexandr Alexandrovich Fischer von Waldheim (1839–1920)
- A.Agostini – Angela Agostini (born 1880)
- A.A.Ham. – Arthur Andrew Hamilton (1855–1929)
- A.A.Hend. – Andrew Augustus Henderson (1816–1876)
- A.Ames – Adeline Ames (1879–1976)
- A.Anderson – Alexander Anderson (1748–1811)
- A.Arber – Agnes Arber (1879–1960)
- Aarons. – Aaron Aaronsohn (1876–1919)
- Aase – Hannah Caroline Aase (1883–1980)
- A.Barbero – Andrés Barbero (1877–1951)
- A.Bassi – Agostino Bassi (1773–1856)
- A.Baytop – Asuman Baytop (1920–2015)
- Abbayes – Henry Nicollon des Abbayes (1898–1974)
- Abbiatti – Delia Abbiatti (born 1918)
- Abbot – John Abbot (1751–c. 1840)
- Abedin – Sultanul Abedin (fl. 1986)
- Aberc. – Henry McLaren, 2nd Baron Aberconway (1879–1953)
- A.Berger – Alwin Berger (1871–1931)
- A.B.Frank – Albert Bernhard Frank (1839–1900)
- A.B.Graf – Alfred Byrd Graf (1901–2001)
- A.B.Jacks. – Albert Bruce Jackson (1876–1947)
- A.B.Nickels – Anna Buck Nickels (1832–1917)
- A.Bloxam – Andrew Bloxam (1801–1878)
- A.Blytt – Axel Gudbrand Blytt (1843–1898)
- A.Br. – Addison Brown (1830–1913)
- Abramov – Ivan N. Abramov (1884–1953)
- Abrams – LeRoy Abrams (1874–1956)
- A.Braun – Alexander Karl Heinrich Braun (1805–1877)
- Abrom. – Johannes Abromeit (1857–1946)
- A.Bruggen – Adolph Cornelis van Bruggen (1929–2016)
- A.Butler – Alan Butler (born 1946)
- A.Cabrera – Ángel Cabrera (1879–1960) (not to be confused with botanist Ángel Lulio Cabrera (1908–1999))
- A.Camus – Aimée Antoinette Camus (1879–1965)
- A.Cast. – Alberto Castellanos (1896–1968)
- A.Cels – Auguste Cels (1809–1898)
- Acerbi – Giuseppe Acerbi (1773–1846)
- Acev.-Rodr. – Pedro Acevedo-Rodríguez (born 1954)
- Ach. – Erik Acharius (1757–1819)
- A.C.H.Blinks – Anne Catherine Hof Blinks (1903–1995)
- A.Chev. – Auguste Jean Baptiste Chevalier (1873–1956)
- Achv. – Agazi Asaturovich Achverdov (1907–1999)
- Ackerman – James David Ackerman (born 1950)
- Acloque – Alexandre Noël Charles Acloque (1871–1908)
- A.C.Schultz – August Christian Schultz (1813–1908)
- A.C.Sm. – Albert Charles Smith (1906–1999)
- Acuña – Julián Acuña Galé (1900–1973)
- A.Cunn. – Allan Cunningham (1791–1839)
- A.C.White – Alain Campbell White (1880–1951)
- Adamčík – Slavomír Adamčík (fl. 2003)
- Adamović – Lujo Adamović (1864–1935)
- Adams – Johann Friedrich Adam (1780–1838)
- Adamson – Robert Stephen Adamson (1885–1965)
- Adans. – Michel Adanson (1727–1806)
- A.DC. – Alphonse Louis Pierre Pyrame de Candolle (1806–1893)
- A.D.Danilov – Alexander Danilovich Danilov (born 1903)
- Ade – Alfred Ade (1876–1968)
- Adelb. – Albert George Ludwig Adelbert (1914–1972)
- Adema – Fredericus Arnoldus Constantin Basil Adema (born 1939)
- Aderh. – Rudolf Ferdinand Theodor Aderhold (1865–1907)
- A.D.Hardy – Alfred Douglas Hardy (1870–1958)
- A.D.Hawkes – Alex Drum Hawkes (1927–1977)
- A.Dietr. – Albert Gottfried Dietrich (1795–1856)
- Adolf – Nina Avgustinovna Adolf (1903–1951)
- A.D.Poulsen – Axel Dalberg Poulsen (born 1961)
- A.D.Rodgers – Andrew Denny Rodgers (1900–1981)
- A.D.Slavin – Arthur Daniel Slavin (1903–1973)
- A.D.Webb – Andrew D. Webb (born 1973)
- A.E.D.Daniels – Albert Ebenezer Dulip Daniels (born 1964)
- Aedo – Carlos Aedo Pérez (born 1960)
- A.E.Hoffm. – Adriana Hoffmann (1940–2022)
- A.E.Holland – Ailsa E. Holland (fl. 1988)
- Aellen – Paul Aellen (1896–1973)
- A.E.Murray – Albert Edward Murray (born 1935)
- A.E.Newton – Angela E. Newton (born 1958)
- A.E.Ortmann – Arnold Edward Ortmann (1863–1927)
- A.E.Reuss – August Emanuel von Reuss (1811–1873)
- A.Ernst – Alfred Ernst (1875–1968)
- A.Evans – Alexander William Evans (1868–1959)
- A.E.van Wyk – Abraham Erasmus van Wyk (born 1952)
- A.E.Wade – Arthur Edwin Wade (1895–1989)
- A.-E.Wolf – Anne-Elizabeth Wolf (fl. 1998)
- A.F.Bartsch – Alfred Frank Bartsch (1913–2009)
- A.Fedtsch. – Alexei Pavlovich Fedchenko (1844–1873)
- A.Fisch. – Alfred Fischer (1858–1913)
- A.Fleischm. – Andreas Fleischmann (born 1980)
- Afonina – Olga Mikhailovna Afonina (born 1945)
- A.F.Peters – Akira F. Peters (fl. 1986)
- A.F.Rob. – A.F. Robinson (fl. 2015)
- A.F.Tryon – Alice Faber Tryon (1920–2009)
- Afzel. – Adam Afzelius (1750–1837)
- Agashe – Shripad Narayan Agashe (1939–2023)
- Agerer – Reinhard Agerer (born 1947)
- A.G.Floyd – Alexander G. Floyd (1926–2022)
- A.G.Ham. – Alexander Greenlaw Hamilton (1852–1941)
- A.Gibson – Alexander Gibson (1800–1867)
- A.G.Jones – Almut Gitter Jones (1923–2013)
- A.G.Lyon – Alexander Geoffrey Lyon (fl. 1950–1960)
- A.G.Mill. – Anthony G. Miller (born 1951)
- Agra – Maria de Fátima Agra (born 1952)
- A.Gray – Asa Gray (1810–1888)
- A.Ham. – Arthur Hamilton (fl. 1832)
- A.Hässl. – Arne Hässler (1904–1952)
- A.Hay – Alistair Hay (born 1955)
- A.Heller – Amos Arthur Heller (1867–1944)
- A.Hend. – Archibald Henderson (1879–1921)
- A.Henry – Augustine Henry (1857–1930)
- A.H.Evans – Arthur Humble Evans (1855–1943)
- A.H.Gentry – Alwyn Howard Gentry (1945–1993)
- A.H.Hasan – Amal Hajiya Hasan (fl. 2022)
- A.H.Heller – Alfonse Henry Heller (1894–1973)
- A.H.Holmgren – Arthur Hermann Holmgren (1912–1992)
- A.Hidayat – Arief Hidayat (fl. 2009)
- A.H.Kent – Adolphus Henry Kent (1828–1913)
- A.H.K.Petrie – Arthur Hill Kelvin Petrie (fl. 1926)
- Ahmadjian – Vernon Ahmadjian (1930–2012)
- Ahrendt – Leslie Walter Allen Ahrendt (1903–1969)
- A.H.S.Lucas – Arthur Henry Shakespeare Lucas (1853–1936)
- A.Huet – Alfred Huet du Pavillon (1829–1907)
- Ainslie – Whitelaw Ainslie (1767–1837)
- Ainsw. – Geoffrey Clough Ainsworth (1905–1998)
- Airy Shaw – Herbert Kenneth Airy Shaw (1902–1985)
- Aitch. – James Edward Tierney Aitchison (1836–1898)
- Aiton – William Aiton (1731–1793)
- A.Jaeger – August Jaeger (1842–1877)
- A.J.Eames – Arthur Johnson Eames (1881–1969)
- A.J.Ford – Andrew James Ford (born 1967)
- A.J.G.Wilson – Annette Jane Gratton Wilson (born 1960)
- A.J.Hend. – Andrew Henderson (born 1950)
- A.J.Hill – Albert Joseph Hill (born 1940)
- A.J.M.Baker – Alan John Martin Baker (born 1948)
- A.J.Paton – Alan James Paton (born 1963)
- A.J.Rupp – A. Jonas Rupp (fl. 1995)
- A.J.Scott – Andrew John Scott (born 1950)
- A.Juss. – Adrien-Henri de Jussieu (1797–1853)
- Aké Assi – Laurent Aké Assi (1931–2014)
- A.Kern. – Anton Kerner von Marilaun (1831–1898)
- Akeroyd – John Akeroyd (born 1952)
- Akhani – Hossein Akhani (born 1965)
- A.K.Irvine – Anthony Kyle Irvine (born 1937)
- Akoègn. – Akpovi Akoègninou (born 1950)
- A.K.Skvortsov – Alexey Skvortsov (1920–2008)
- A.K.S.Prasad – Akshinthala K. Sai Krishna Prasad (born 1949)
- A.Kurz – Albert Kurz (1886–1948)
- A.K.Wallace – Anne Karin Wallace (fl. 1997)
- Alain – Henri Alain Liogier (1916–2009)
- A.Lamb – Anthony Lamb (1937–2024)
- A.L.Andrews – Albert LeRoy Andrews (1878–1961)
- Alb. – Johannes Baptista von Albertini (1769–1831)
- Albov – Nikolai Michailovich Albov (1866–1897)
- Albr. – David Edward Albrecht (born 1962)
- Al.Brongn. – Alexandre Brongniart (1770–1847)
- Albuq. – Byron Wilson Pereira de Albuquerque (1932–2003)
- Alcaraz – Francisco Alcaraz Ariza (born 1958)
- Alderw. – Cornelis Rugier Willem Karel van Alderwerelt van Rosenburgh (1863–1936)
- Aldrovandi – Ulisse Aldrovandi (1522–1605)
- Alef. – Friedrich Georg Christoph Alefeld (1820–1872)
- A.Lem. – Adrien Lemaire (1852–1902)
- A.Lesson – Pierre Adolphe Lesson (1805–1888)
- Alexander – Edward Johnston Alexander (1901–1985)
- Alexeeva – Nina Borisovna Alexeeva (born 1954)
- A.L.Grant – Adele Gerard Lewis Grant (1881–1969)
- Ali – Syed Irtifaq Ali (born 1930)
- Alison Stewart – Alison Stewart (born 1957)
- Al.Jahn – Alfredo Jahn (1867–1940)
- All. – Carlo Allioni (1728–1804)
- Allan – Harry Howard Barton Allan (1882–1957)
- Alleiz. – Aymar Charles d'Alleizette (1884–1967)
- Allemão – Francisco Freire Allemão e Cysneiro (1797–1874)
- Allen – Timothy Field Allen (1837–1902)
- Allred – Kelly Allred (born 1949)
- Alm – Carl Gustav Alm (1888–1962)
- Almeda – Frank Almeda (born 1946)
- Aloeva – Ljusja Mamedovna Aloeva (1928–2011)
- Á.Löve – Áskell Löve (1916–1994)
- Alphand – Jean-Charles Adolphe Alphand (1817–1891)
- Alph.Wood – Alphonso Wood (1810–1881)
- Alpino – Prospero Alpinio (1553–1617)
- Al-Shehbaz – Ihsan Ali Al-Shehbaz (born 1939)
- A.L.Sm. – Annie Lorrain Smith (1854–1937)
- Alston – Arthur Hugh Garfit Alston (1902–1958)
- Alstr. – Clas Alströmer (1736–1794)
- Altam. – Fernando Altamirano (1848–1908)
- Altschul – Siri von Reis (1931–2021)
- A.Lyons – Albert Brown Lyons (1841–1926)
- A.Macedo – Amaro Macedo (1914–2014)
- Amakawa – Tairoko Amakawa (born 1917)
- Amann – Johann Amann (1814–1878)
- Amaral – Ayrton Amaral (born 1948)
- A.M.Ashby – Alison Marjorie Ashby (1901–1987)
- A.Massal. – Abramo Bartolommeo Massalongo (1824–1860)
- A.Mathews – Andrew Mathews (1801–1841)
- Amberg – Otto Amberg (1875–1920)
- Ambronn – Hermann Ambronn (1856–1927)
- Ambrosetti – José Arturo Ambrosetti (born 1939)
- Ambrosi – Francesco Ambrosi (1821–1897)
- Ambroz – Josef Ambrož (1886–1950)
- A.M.Buchanan – Alex M. Buchanan (born 1944)
- A.M.Carter – Annetta Mary Carter (1907–1991)
- A.M.Cowan – Adeline May Cowan (1892–1921)
- A.Meeuse – Adrianus Dirk Jacob Meeuse (1914–2010)
- Ameljcz. – V. P. Ameljczenko (born 1948)
- Ames – Oakes Ames (1874–1950)
- A.M.Gray – Alan Maurice Gray (born 1943)
- Amich – Francisco Amich García (born 1953)
- Amici – Giovanni Battista Amici (1786–1863)
- Amin – Amal Amin (born 1929)
- Amirkh. – Amirkhan Magomedovich Amirkhanov (born 1952)
- Amman – Johann Amman (1707–1741)
- Ammann – Morgane Ammann (born 1986)
- Ammerman – Elizabeth Ammerman (born 1917)
- Ammirati – Joseph F. Ammirati (born 1942)
- Amo – Mariano del Amo y Mora (1809–1896)
- Amor – Angel Amor Morales (born 1959)
- A.M.Ragonese – Ana Maria Ragonese (1928–1999)
- A.M.Ross – Alexander Milton Ross (1832–1897)
- Amshoff – Gerda Jane Hillegonda Amshoff (1913–1985)
- Amsler – Charles D. Amsler (born 1959)
- A.M.Sm. – Annie Morrill Smith (1856–1946)
- A.Murray bis – Andrew Murray (1812–1878)
- A.N.Danilov – Afanasij Nikolaevich Danilov (1903–1942)
- A.N.Demidov – Anatoly Nikolaievich Demidov, 1st Prince of San Donato (1813–1870)
- Anderb. – Arne A. Anderberg (born 1954)
- Andersen – Johannes Carl Andersen (1873–1962)
- Anderson – James Anderson (1738–1809)
- Andersson – Nils Johan Andersson (1821–1880)
- Andr. – Gábor Andreánszky (1895–1967)
- André – Édouard André (1840–1911)
- Andres – Heinrich Andres (1883–1970)
- Andrews – Henry Cranke Andrews (c. 1759–1835)
- Andr.Hend. – Andrew Henderson (c. 1823–1906)
- Andriamih. – Tefy H. Andriamihajarivo (fl. 2011)
- Andronov – Nikolaĭ Matveevich Andronov (fl. 1955)
- Andrz. – Antoni Lukianowicz Andrzejowski (1785–1868)
- A.Nelson – Aven Nelson (1859–1952) (A.Nels. is also used)
- A.Neumann – Alfred Neumann (1916–1973)
- Angely. – João Alberto Angely (born 1917)
- Ångstr. – Johan Ångström (1813–1879)
- A.N.Henry – Ambrose Nathaniel Henry (born 1936)
- A.N.Rao – Abbareddy Nageswara Rao (born 1954)
- Ant.Juss. – Antoine de Jussieu (1686–1758)
- Ant.Molina – José Antonio Molina Rosito (1926–2012)
- Antoine – Franz Antoine (1815–1886)
- Antonelli – Alexandre Antonelli (born 1978)
- Ant.Schott – Anton Schott (1866–1945)
- Anzi – Martino Anzi (1812–1883)
- Aongyong – Kithisak Aongyong (fl. 2020)
- A.O.S.Vieira – Ana Odete Santos Vieira (born 1958)
- A.Paiva – Antonio da Costa Paiva (1806–1879)
- Apang – Ona Apang (fl. 2012)
- A.P.Br. – Andrew Phillip Brown (born 1951)
- A.Pearson – Arthur Anselm Pearson (1874–1954)
- A.Phelps – Almira Hart Lincoln Phelps (1793–1884)
- Appelhans – Marc S. Appelhans (born 1980)
- Applegate – Elmer Ivan Applegate (1867–1949)
- A.Pramanik – Arabinda Pramanik (born 1957)
- Apstein – Carl Heinrich Apstein (1862–1950)
- A.Q.Hu – Ai Qun Hu (fl. 2009)
- A.Raynal – Aline Marie Raynal (1937–2022)
- A.R.Bean – Anthony Bean (born 1957)
- Arcang. – Giovanni Arcangeli (1840–1921)
- A.R.Chapm. – Alexander Robert Chapman (born 1959)
- Archer – Thomas Croxen Archer (1817–1885)
- Archer-Hind – Thomas H. Archer-Hind (fl. 1880)
- Archila – Fredy Archila (born 1973)
- A.R.Clapham – Arthur Roy Clapham (1904–1990)
- Ard. – Pietro Arduino (1728–1805)
- Ardoino – Honoré Jean Baptiste Ardoino (1819–1874)
- Arechav. – José Arechavaleta (1838–1912)
- A.Regel – Johann Albert von Regel (1845–1908)
- Arenb – Florence Freida Arenberg (1907–1995)
- Arènes – Jean Arènes (1898–1960)
- Aresch. – Johan Erhard Areschoug (1811–1887)
- A.R.Ferguson – Allan Ross Ferguson (born 1943)
- A.R.Flores – Ana Rosa Flores (born 1953)
- Argent – Graham Charles George Argent (born 1941)
- Argus – George William Argus (1929–2022)
- A.Rich. – Achille Richard (1794–1852)
- Ariza – Luis Ariza Espinar (1933–2020) (L.Ariza is also used)
- A.R.Lourenço – Ana Raquel Lima Lourenço (fl. 2013)
- Arm. – Edward Armitage (1822–1906)
- Armari – Beatrice Armari (1877–1918)
- Arn. – George Arnott Walker-Arnott (1799–1868)
- Arnell – Hampus Wilhelm Arnell (1848–1932)
- Arnold – Ferdinand Christian Gustav Arnold (1828–1901)
- A.Robyns – Andre Georges Marie Walter Albert Robyns (1935–2003)
- A.R.Penfold – Arthur de Ramon Penfold (1890–1980)
- Arráb. – Francisco Antonio de Arrábida (1771–1850)
- Arrigoni – Pier Virgilio Arrigoni (born 1932)
- Arruda – Manuel Arruda da Câmara (1752–1810)
- Arsène – Gustave Arsène (1867–1938)
- A.R.Simões – Ana Rita Simões (fl. 2011)
- A.R.Sm. – Alan Reid Smith (born 1943)
- Art.Castro – Arturo Castro-Castro (born 1979)
- Arthur – Joseph Charles Arthur (1850–1942)
- Art.Mey. – Arthur Meyer (1850–1922)
- Artz – Lena Clemmons Artz (1891–1976)
- A.R.Vickery – Albert Roy Vickery (born 1947)
- Arv.-Touv. – Casimir Arvet-Touvet (1841–1913)
- A.S.Calvert – Amelia Smith Calvert (1876–1965)
- Asch. – Paul Friedrich August Ascherson (1834–1913)
- A.Schatz – Albert Schatz (1920–2005)
- A.Schenk – Alexander Schenk (1864–1924)
- A.Schimp. – Andreas Franz Wilhelm Schimper (1856–1901)
- A.Schlag. – Adolf Schlagintweit (1829–1857)
- A.Schlick. – August Schlickum (1867–1946)
- A.Schneid. – Albert Schneider (1863–1928)
- A.Schnyd. – Albert Schnyder (1856–1938)
- A.Schott – Arthur Carl Victor Schott (1814–1875)
- A.Schreib. – Annelis Schreiber (1927– 2010)
- A.Schultz – Arthur Schultz (1838–1915)
- A.S.Foster – Adriance S. Foster (1901–1973)
- A.S.George – Alex George (born 1939)
- Ashby – Edwin Ashby (1861–1941)
- Ashe – William Willard Ashe (1872–1932)
- Ashton – Ruth Elizabeth Ashton (1896–1987)
- Ashwin – Margot Bernice Ashwin (1935–1992)
- A.Sinclair – Andrew Sinclair (1796–1861)
- Askerova – Rosa K. Askerova (born 1929)
- Asmussen – Conny Asmussen (fl. 1997)
- A.Soriano – Alberto Soriano (1920–1998)
- A.Spreng. – Anton Sprengel (1803–1851)
- A.S.Rob. – Alastair Robinson (born 1980)
- Assem – J. van den Assem (fl. 1953)
- Ast – Suzanne Jovet-Ast (1914–2006)
- A.Stahl – Agustín Stahl (1842–1917)
- A.St.-Hil. – Augustin Saint-Hilaire (1799–1853)
- Aston – Helen Isobel Aston (1934–2020)
- Astuti – Inggit Pudji Astuti (fl. 2004)
- Aswal – B. S. Aswal (born 1948)
- A.Terracc. – Achille Terracciano (1861–1917)
- A.T.Grimme – Arnold Grimme (1868–1958)
- Atha – Daniel E. Atha (born 1962)
- A.Thouars – Abel Aubert du Petit-Thouars (1793–1864)
- Atk. – William Sackston Atkinson (1821–1875)
- A.T.Lee – Alma Theodora Lee (1912–1990)
- Atthan. – Anusha Gayan Atthanagoda (fl. 2016)
- A.T.M.Pedersen — Anne Tiril Myhre Pedersen (fl. 2017)
- Aubl. – Jean Baptiste Christophore Fusée Aublet (1720–1778)
- Aubrév. – André Aubréville (1897–1982)
- Aubriet – Claude Aubriet (1651–1742)
- Aucher – Pierre Martin Rémi Aucher-Éloy (1792–1838)
- Audas – James Wales Claredon Audas (1872–1959)
- Audib. – Urbain Audibert (1791–1846)
- Audubon – John James Audubon (1785–1851)
- Aug.DC. – Richard Émile Augustin de Candolle (1868–1920)
- Augustine – Jomy Augustine (fl. 1998)
- Ausserd. – Anton Ausserdorfer (1836–1885)
- A.Usteri – Alfred Usteri (1869–1948)
- Austin – Coe Finch Austin (1831–1880)
- A.Vázquez – Antonio Vázquez (born 1961)
- A.V.Bobrov – Alexey Vladimir Bobrov (born 1969)
- A.V.Duthie – Augusta Vera Duthie (1881–1963)
- Avé-Lall. – Julius Léopold Eduard Avé-Lallemant (1803–1867)
- Aver. – Leonid Vladimirovich Averyanov (born 1955)
- Averett – John Earl Averett (1943–2017)
- Avers – Charlotte J. Avers (fl. 1953)
- Averyanova – Anna Leonidovna Averyanova (born 1981)
- A.V.Gilman – Arthur V. Gilman (fl. 2003)
- A.V.Roberts – Andrew Vaughan Roberts (born 1940)
- A.Wall – Arnold Wall (1869–1966)
- A.Wallace – Alexander Wallace (1829–1899)
- A.W.Benn. – Alfred William Bennett (1833–1902)
- A.W.Archer – Alan W. Archer (born 1930)
- A.Weber – Anton Weber (born 1947)
- A.W.Hill – Arthur William Hill (1875–1941)
- A.W.Howitt – Alfred William Howitt (1830–1908)
- A.Wigg. – Heinrich August Ludwig Wiggers (1803–1880)
- A.W.Purdie – Andrew William Purdie (1940–1989)
- A.W.Russell – Anna Worsley Russell (1807–1876)
- Axelrod – Daniel I. Axelrod (1910–1998)
- Aymard – Gerardo Antonio Aymard Corredor (born 1959)
- Ayres – William Port Ayres (1815–1875)
- Azara – Félix de Azara (1746–1821)

== B–Z ==
Contents: Top	A	B	C	D	E F	G	H	I J	K L	M	N O	P	Q R	S	T U V	W X Y Z

To find entries for B–Z, use the table of contents above.

== See also ==
- List of South African plant botanical authors
- List of botanists
- Category:Botanists
- List of Russian botanists
- List of zoologists by author abbreviation
