= Pimentelia =

Pimentelia may refer to:

- Pimentelia (beetle), a genus of beetles in the family Chrysomelidae
- Pimentelia (plant), a genus of plants in the family Rubiaceae
