= Ausserdorfer =

Ausserdorfer is a surname. Notable people with the surname include:

- Anton Ausserdorfer (1836–1885), Austrian clergyman and botanical collector
- Hubert Ausserdorfer (fl. 1978), Austrian luger
- Walter Ausserdorfer (1939–2019), Italian luger
