= L. ferruginea =

L. ferruginea may refer to:

- Ladenbergia ferruginea, a plant species endemic to Peru
- Limanda ferruginea, the yellowtail flounder, a fish species

== See also ==
- Ferruginea (disambiguation)
