= Remijia =

Scientific classification
- Kingdom: Plantae
- Clade: Tracheophytes
- Clade: Angiosperms
- Clade: Eudicots
- Clade: Asterids
- Order: Gentianales
- Family: Rubiaceae
- Subfamily: Cinchonoideae
- Tribe: Cinchoneae
- Genus: Remijia; DC.

Species
- 45 species; see text.

Genus of plants

Remijia is a genus of flowering plants in the family Rubiaceae. Within the family, it is a member of the subfamily Cinchonoideae and the tribe Cinchoneae.

There are about 36 species in Remijia. They are native to Peru and Brazil. Some of the species have hollow stems that harbor ants.

The bark of Remijia contains 0.5%–2% of quinine, a chemical substance often used as a medicinal drug and flavour additive in tonic water. It is cheaper than the bark of Cinchona, another source of quinine. Because of its intense flavor, the bark of Remijia is used in making tonic water.

No type species has ever been designated for Remijia. In 2005, two species were transferred from Remijia to a new genus, Ciliosemina.

== Species ==
There are 45 recognised species:

- Remijia amazonica K.Schum. in C.F.P.von Martius & auct. suc. (eds.)
- Remijia amphithrix Standl.
- Remijia aracamuniensis (Steyerm.) C.M.Taylor
- Remijia argentea Steyerm.
- Remijia asperula Standl.
- Remijia berryi Steyerm.
- Remijia chelomaphylla G.A.Sullivan
- Remijia cinchonicarpa Sucre
- Remijia delascioi Steyerm.
- Remijia densiflora Benth.
- Remijia duckei Standl.
- Remijia ferruginea (A.St.-Hil.) DC..
- Remijia firmula (Mart.) Wedd.
- Remijia globosa (Steyerm.) C.M.Taylor
- Remijia glomerata Huber
- Remijia grazielae Sucre
- Remijia hilarii DC.
- Remijia hirsuta Sucre
- Remijia hispida Spruce ex K.Schum. in C.F.P.von Martius & auct. suc. (eds.)
- Remijia hubbardiorum B.M.Boom
- Remijia involucrata K.Schum. in C.F.P.von Martius & auct. suc. (eds.)
- Remijia kuhlmannii Sucre
- Remijia leiocalyx Standl. ex Steyerm.
- Remijia longifolia Benth. ex Standl.
- Remijia macrocnemia (Mart.) Wedd.
- Remijia macrophylla (H.Karst.) Benth. & Hook.f. ex Flueck.
- Remijia maguirei Steyerm.
- Remijia marahuacensis Steyerm.
- Remijia morilloi Steyerm.
- Remijia pacimonica Standl.
- Remijia paniculata DC.
- Remijia physophora Benth. ex K.Schum. in C.F.P.von Martius & auct. suc. (eds.)
- Remijia pilosinervula Steyerm.
- Remijia reducta Steyerm.
- Remijia roraimae (Benth.) K.Schum. in C.F.P.von Martius & auct. suc. (eds.)
- Remijia sessilis Steyerm.
- Remijia sipapoensis Steyerm.
- Remijia steyermarkii Standl.
- Remijia tenuiflora Benth.
- Remijia trianae Wernham
- Remijia ulei K.Krause
- Remijia uniflora C.M.Taylor
- Remijia vaupesiana Steyerm.
- Remijia vellozoi DC.
- Remijia wurdackii Steyerm.
