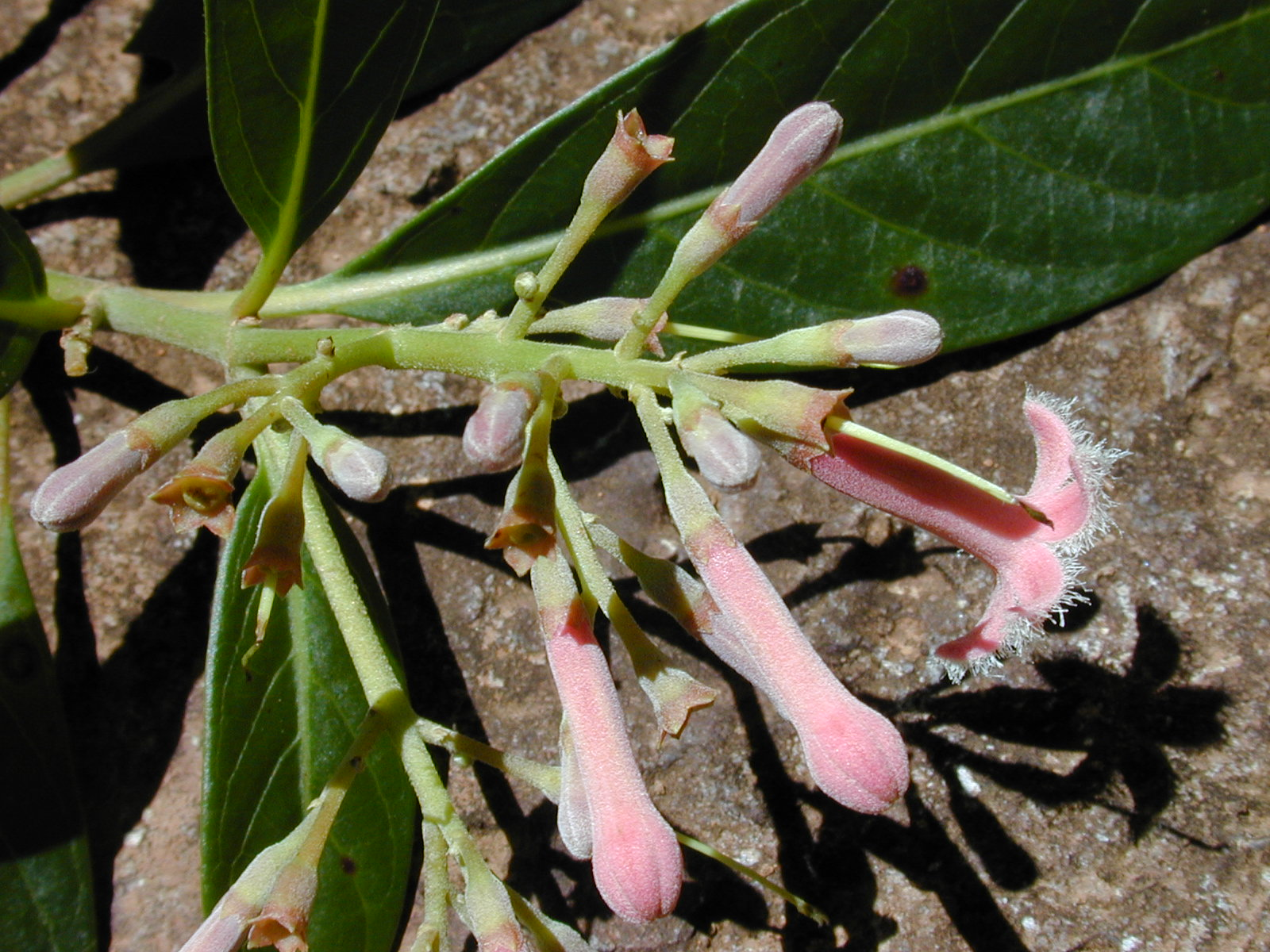
- Cinchona calisaya

Scientific classification
- Kingdom: Plantae
- Clade: Tracheophytes
- Clade: Angiosperms
- Clade: Eudicots
- Clade: Asterids
- Order: Gentianales
- Family: Rubiaceae
- Subfamily: Cinchonoideae
- Tribe: Cinchoneae; DC.

Type genus
- Cinchona L.

= Cinchoneae =

Tribe of plants

The Cinchoneae are a tribe of flowering plants in the family Rubiaceae containing about 125 species in 9 genera. Representatives are found from Costa Rica to southern tropical America. Species within Cinchoneae are characterized as small trees or shrubs with imbricate or valvate corolla aestivation and often dry capsular fruits. Many species contain alkaloids.

== Genera ==
Currently accepted names

- Ciliosemina Antonelli (2 sp)
- Cinchona L. (24 sp)
- Cinchonopsis L.Andersson (1 sp)
- Joosia H.Karst. (12 sp)
- Ladenbergia Klotzsch (35 sp)
- Maguireocharis Steyerm. (1 sp)
- Pimentelia Wedd. (1 sp)
- Remijia DC. (45 sp)
- Stilpnophyllum Hook.f. (4 sp)

Synonyms

- Cascarilla (Endl.) Wedd. = Ladenbergia
- Cephalodendron Steyerm. = Remijia
- Kinkina Adans. = Cinchona
- Macrocneumum Vand. = Remijia
- Quinquina Boehm. = Cinchona
