= Timothy Allen (disambiguation) =

Timothy Allen (born 1971) is an English photographer and filmmaker.

Tim Allen (born 1953) is an American actor and comedian.

Timothy Allen may also refer to:

- Timothy F. H. Allen (born 1942), British botanist
- Timothy Field Allen (1837–1902), American physician and botanist
- Tim Allen (footballer) (born 1970), former Australian rules footballer
- Timmy Allen (born 2000), American basketball player

== See also ==
- Tim Allan, British public relations consultant
- Tim Allan (Canadian football) (born 1955), Canadian football player
