= Cinchonopsis =

Scientific classification
- Kingdom: Plantae
- Clade: Tracheophytes
- Clade: Angiosperms
- Clade: Eudicots
- Clade: Asterids
- Order: Gentianales
- Family: Rubiaceae
- Subfamily: Cinchonoideae
- Tribe: Cinchoneae
- Genus: Cinchonopsis; L.Andersson
- Species: C. amazonica

Binomial name
- Cinchonopsis amazonica (Standl.) L.Andersson

Synonyms
- Cinchona amazonica Standl.

Genus of plants

Cinchonopsis is a monotypic genus of flowering plants in the family Rubiaceae containing the single species Cinchonopsis amazonica. It is native to South America, where it occurs in the Amazon basin to the eastern slopes of the Andes.

This is a tree with oppositely arranged leaves and terminal inflorescences. The white flowers have funnel-shaped corollas with five triangular lobes. The fruit is a papery cylindrical capsule. This species was separated from genus Cinchona mainly on the basis of the morphology of the flowers.
