= Ladenbergia acutifolia =

Conservation status
- Vulnerable (IUCN 2.3)

Scientific classification
- Kingdom: Plantae
- Clade: Tracheophytes
- Clade: Angiosperms
- Clade: Eudicots
- Clade: Asterids
- Order: Gentianales
- Family: Rubiaceae
- Genus: Ladenbergia
- Species: L. acutifolia

Binomial name
- Ladenbergia acutifolia (Ruiz & Pav.) Klotzsch

Synonyms
- Buena acutifolia (Ruiz & Pav.) Wedd.; Cascarilla acutifolia (Ruiz & Pav.) Wedd.; Cinchona acutifolia Ruiz & Pav.

Species of plant

Ladenbergia acutifolia is a species of plant in the family Rubiaceae. It is endemic to Peru.
