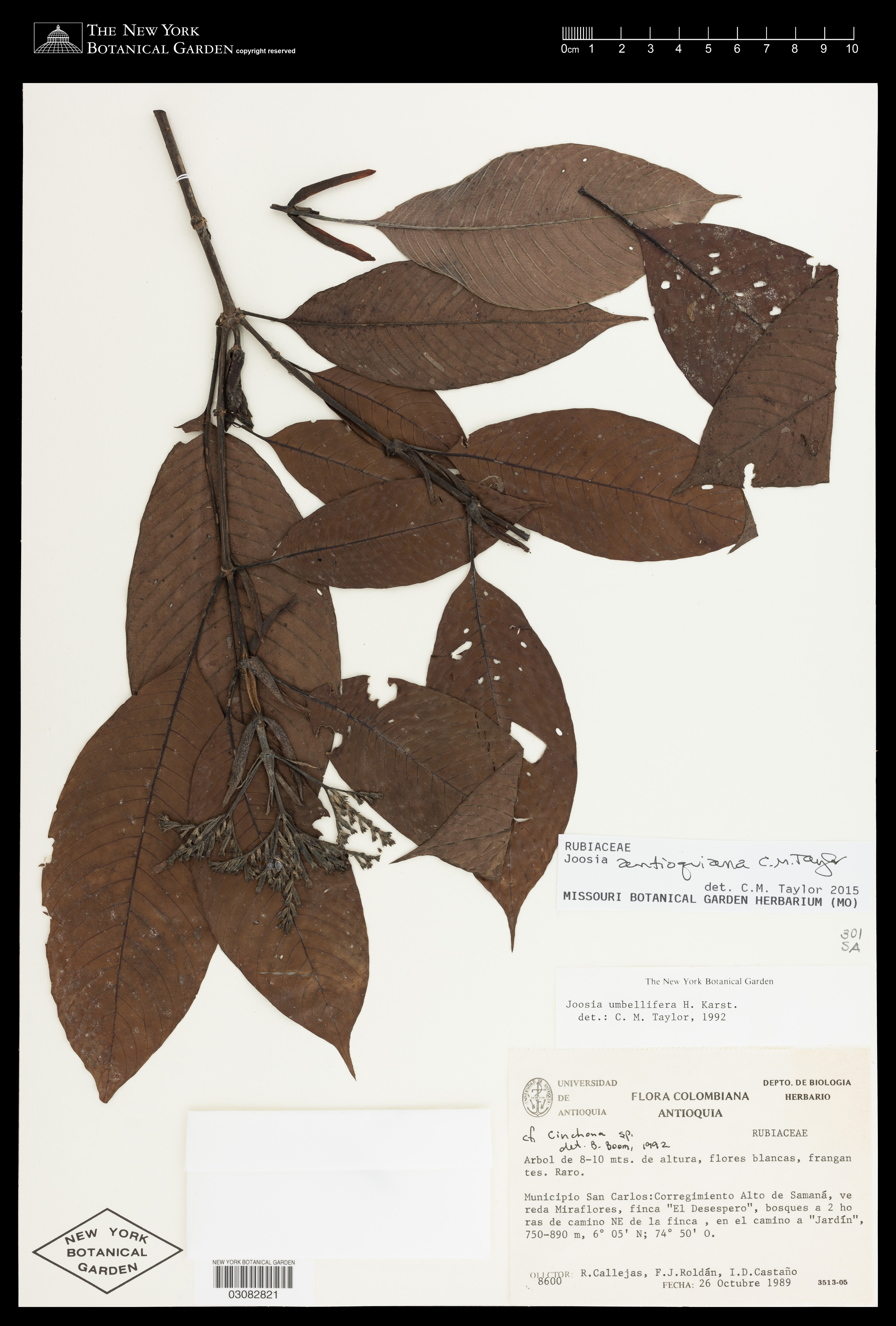

Conservation status
- Endangered (IUCN 3.1)

Scientific classification
- Kingdom: Plantae
- Clade: Embryophytes
- Clade: Tracheophytes
- Clade: Spermatophytes
- Clade: Angiosperms
- Clade: Eudicots
- Clade: Asterids
- Order: Gentianales
- Family: Rubiaceae
- Genus: Joosia
- Species: J. aequatoria

Binomial name
- Joosia aequatoria Steyerm.

= Joosia aequatoria =

Species of plant

Joosia aequatoria is a species of flowering plant in the family Rubiaceae. It is endemic to Ecuador.
