= Ladenbergia rubiginosa =

Conservation status
- Critically Endangered (IUCN 3.1)

Scientific classification
- Kingdom: Plantae
- Clade: Tracheophytes
- Clade: Angiosperms
- Clade: Eudicots
- Clade: Asterids
- Order: Gentianales
- Family: Rubiaceae
- Genus: Ladenbergia
- Species: L. rubiginosa

Binomial name
- Ladenbergia rubiginosa L.Andersson

Species of plant

Ladenbergia rubiginosa is a species of plant in the family Rubiaceae. It is endemic to Ecuador.
