= Daniel E. Atha =

American botanist (born 1962)

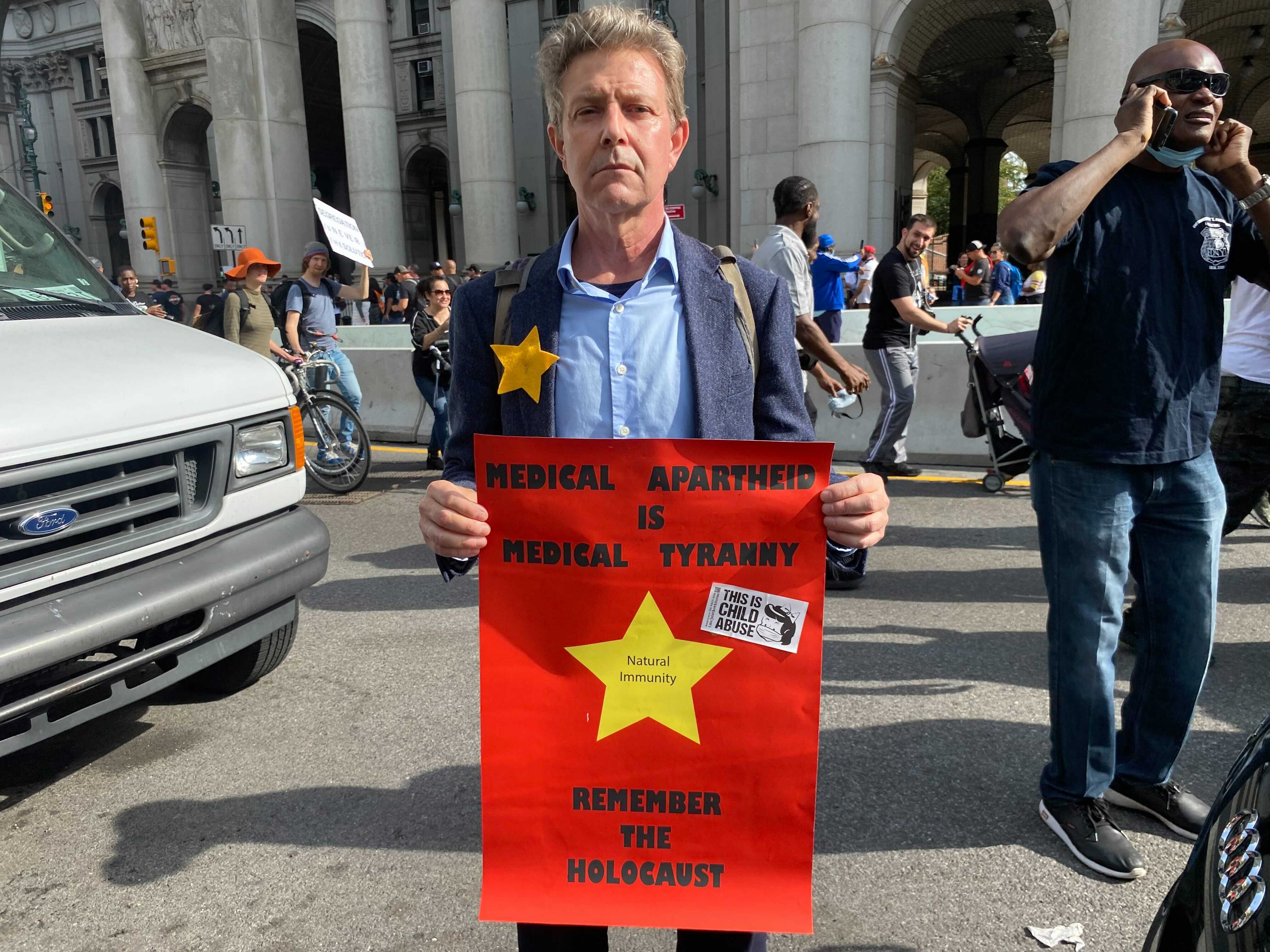
- Atha in 2021, protesting a COVID-19 vaccination mandate bill
- Born: 1962 (age 63–64)
- Education: City University of New York
- Known for: Floristics; Acalypha (plant family); Polygonaceae (plant family)
- Scientific career
- Fields: Botany
- Workplaces: New York Botanical Garden
- Author abbrev. (botany): Atha

Daniel Atha (born 1962) is an American botanist. In his work as a botanist he has collected plants in all 50 states of the United States, as well as several additional countries. Atha's work was focused on three areas: "floristics—what plants grow in a particular region; taxonomy—how to tell one plant from another, what to call it and what it's related to; and applied botany—how plants are used for food, medicine, shelter and other useful purposes." Atha has been known as a prominent regional botanist, and the high-profile botanical projects with which he has been involved (such as the recent Spontaneous Flora of Central Park project) have garnered national and international attention.

== Career ==
=== New York Botanical Garden ===
Daniel Atha was the Director of Conservation Outreach at New York Botanical Garden. Atha was involved in work related to invasive plants in the greater-New York City region, including Westchester County. While employed at the NYBG, Atha collected plant material for Merck, Pfizer, The National Cancer Institute, L’Oreal, Cornell Weill Medical Center and many other organizations. Atha was also the Associate Editor for Brittonia. Atha co-developed the curriculum for the course Pressing Plants for Art and Science, as part of the certificate program in Botany offered through the New York Botanical Garden’s Continuing Education Program. He has taught hundreds of students the techniques for collecting and preserving museum-quality herbarium specimens.

In 2021, Atha left the New York Botanical Garden due to their vaccination mandate, and also that same year, protested against a state bill that Jeffrey Dinowitz had co-sponsored to add COVID-19 to the required immunizations to attend school, wearing a yellow badge that Jews were ordered to wear during the Nazi regime. Dinowitz said the "display of swastikas and yellow Stars of David [...] were repugnant and offensive".

In 2022 he researched and wrote a report on the ecological history of Seneca Village for the Central Park Conservancy. Through 2024, he has continued to collect specimens for taxonomic and floristic studies, teach plant collecting techniques and research the genus Persicaria (Smartweeds) of North America.

==== New York City EcoFlora ====
This project, in the prototyping phase through 2017, was designed to engage New York city residents in protecting and preserving New York City's native plant species. The project aimed to use citizen scientists to gather and organize data related to plants, animals, fungi, and habitats in the region. This data will then be synthesized with existing historic natural history collections and scientific publications. "The New York City EcoFlora will be a real-time, online, ongoing checklist of plants—the first ever to connect plants in the web of life in New York City—that will result in a dynamic resource for conservation planning as well as in New Yorkers that are better informed about the importance of urban ecologies and who can contribute to protecting them."

==== Flora of Central Park ====
One of Atha's research projects involved documenting and collecting every naturally occurring plant in Central Park. This project represents a collaboration between The New York Botanical Garden, the Central Park Conservancy and the New York City Department of Parks and Recreation. The aims of this project are to document the wild flora of Central Park, and to provide an up-to-date botanical inventory "to aid on-going restoration, conservation, education and recreation programs and to document the flora for scientific, ecological and conservation studies."

The quote below comes from an interview Atha gave to The New York Times in 2015

"We thought, 'Wow, Central Park is right in the middle of New York City, in the densest urban metropolitan region in North America,'" recalled Mr. Atha, who has studied plants in all 50 states, as well as Bolivia, Russia and Vietnam. "'And yet there is nobody documenting the flora today. How crazy is that?'"

==== Emerging Invasive: Corydalis incisa ====
Atha and others at the New York Botanical Garden and Lower Hudson PRISM (one of eight Partnerships for Regional Invasive Species Management in New York State) coordinated a team of citizen scientists to document and remove Corydalis incisa, an emerging invasive species found along the Bronx River in Westchester County, NY and Bronx County, NY.

== Art ==
Atha's parents were artists, and he has been involved in several community projects related to the intersection of botany and art.

== Selected bibliography ==
This list has been generated with information from Daniel Atha's former staff profile page on the New York Botanical Garden website.

- Atha, D. E. 2008. A new species of Acalypha (Euphorbiaceae: Acalyphoideae: Acalypheae) from Belize and adjacent Mexico and Guatemala. Brittonia 60: 185–189.
- Kikodze, D., M. Tavartkiladze, T. Svanidze, D.E. Atha (editor of English text). 2007. Plants of Georgia. Field Guide. Tsignis Sakhelosno, Tbilisi, Georgia. 224 pp.
- Bridgewater, S.G.M., D.J. Harris, C. Whitefoord, A.K. Monro, M.G. Penn, D.A. Sutton, B. Sayer, B. Adams, M. Balick, D.E. Atha, J. Solomon, B. Holst. 2006. A preliminary checklist of the vascular plants of the Chiquibul Forest, Belize. Edinb. J. Bot. 63: 269–321.
- Atha, D. E., L. Romero & T. Forrest. 2005. Bark volume determination of Bursera simaruba in Belize. Caribbean Journal of Science. 41: 843–848.
- Atha, D. E. 2004. Polygonaceae. pp. 308–310 in N. Smith, S. A. Mori, A. Henderson, D. Stevenson and S. Heald (eds), Flowering Plants of the Neotropics. Princeton University Press, Princeton.
- Atha, D. E. 2004. Phytolaccaceae. pp. 292–294 in N. Smith, S. A. Mori, A. Henderson, D. Stevenson and S. Heald (eds), Flowering Plants of the Neotropics. Princeton University Press, Princeton.
- Balick, M. J., M. H. Nee & D. E. Atha. 2000. Checklist of the vascular plants of Belize, with common names and uses. Memoirs of the New York Botanical Garden 85: 1–246.
- Ford, L. J., R. J. Hawkins, D. E. Atha. 2009. A Field Guide to the Wildflowers of Mexico's Copper Canyon region. The Donning Company Publishers, Virginia Beach. 160 pp.
- Atha, D. E. & W. Carr. 2010. First Report of Persicaria hispida (Polygonaceae) from North America North of Mexico (Texas). J. Bot. Res. Inst. Texas 4(2): 561–564.
- Reveal, J. L. & D. E. Atha. (2010). New combinations and typifications in Bistorta, Persicaria, Polygonum and Rumex (Polygonaceae). Brittonia 62: 243–263.
- Atha, D. E., M. H. Nee & R. F. C. Naczi. 2010. Persicaria extremiorientalis (Polygonaceae) is established in the flora of the eastern United States of America. The Journal of the Torrey Botanical Society 137: 333–338.
- Atha, D. E., J. D. Mitchell, S. K. Pell & F. R. Camacho. 2011. A new species of Comocladia (Anacardiaceae) from Belize and Guatemala. Brittonia 63: 370–374.
- Reveal, J. L. & D. E. Atha. 2012. 8. Persicaria (L.) Mill. Smartweed, pp 236–250. in Cronquist et al. (eds), Intermountain Flora. The New York Botanical Garden Press, Bronx, NY.
- Atha, D. E. 2012. New Vascular Plant County Records from Central Texas. Phytoneuron 2012-100: 1–3.
- Muñoz-Rodríguez, P., J. M. Cardiel & D. E. Atha. 2014. Acalypha subgenus Linostachys (Euphorbiaceae, Acalyphoideae): a global review. Phytotaxa 166 (3): 199–221.
- Atha, D. E., J. L. Reveal, K. N. Gandhi. 2014. (2298–2299) Proposals to conserve Persicaria maculosa, nom. cons., against Polygonum vernum and to reject the name Polygonum subg. Dioctus (Polygonaceae). Taxon 63: 689–690.
- Atha, D., E. Feliciano, and A. Felber. 2014. New vascular plant county records from Bronx County, New York. Phytoneuron 2014-87: 1–2.
- Atha, D, J. A. Schuler, and S. Lumban Tobing. 2014. Corydalis incisa (Fumariaceae) in Bronx and Westchester counties, New York. Phytoneuron 2014-96: 1–6.
- Ingo, L., J. Moschny, V. N. Kerimov, M. Khutsishvili, D. E. Atha, R. P. Borris & D. Koomoa. 2015. Juniper extracts induce calcium signalling and apoptosis in neuroblastoma cells. Journal of Pharma and Pharmaeutical Sciences. 1: 1–7.
- Lange, I., J. Moschny, K. Tamanyan, M. Khutsishvili, D. E. Atha, R. P. Borris & D. Koomoa. 2016. Scrophularia orientalis extract induces calcium signaling and apoptosis in neuroblastoma cells. International Journal of Oncology 48: 1608–1616. https://dx.doi.org/10.3892/ijo.2016.3373.
- Atha, D., R. Alvarez, D. Feeser, M. Feder, Z. Wang, and R. Kelly. 2016. Gamochaeta pensylvanica (Asteraceae) is established in the New York flora. Phytoneuron 2016-22: 1–4. Published 3 March 2016. ISSN 2153-733X.
- Simon, T., Al-Shaykh, D. Atha and K. Fowle. 2016. Paperwork and the Will of Capital. Hatje Cantz. 200pp.
- Atha, D., T. Forrest, R. F. C. Naczi, M. C. Pace, M. Rubin, J. A. Schuler and M. Nee. 2016. The historic and extant vascular flora of the New York Botanical Garden. Brittonia 68: 245–277.
