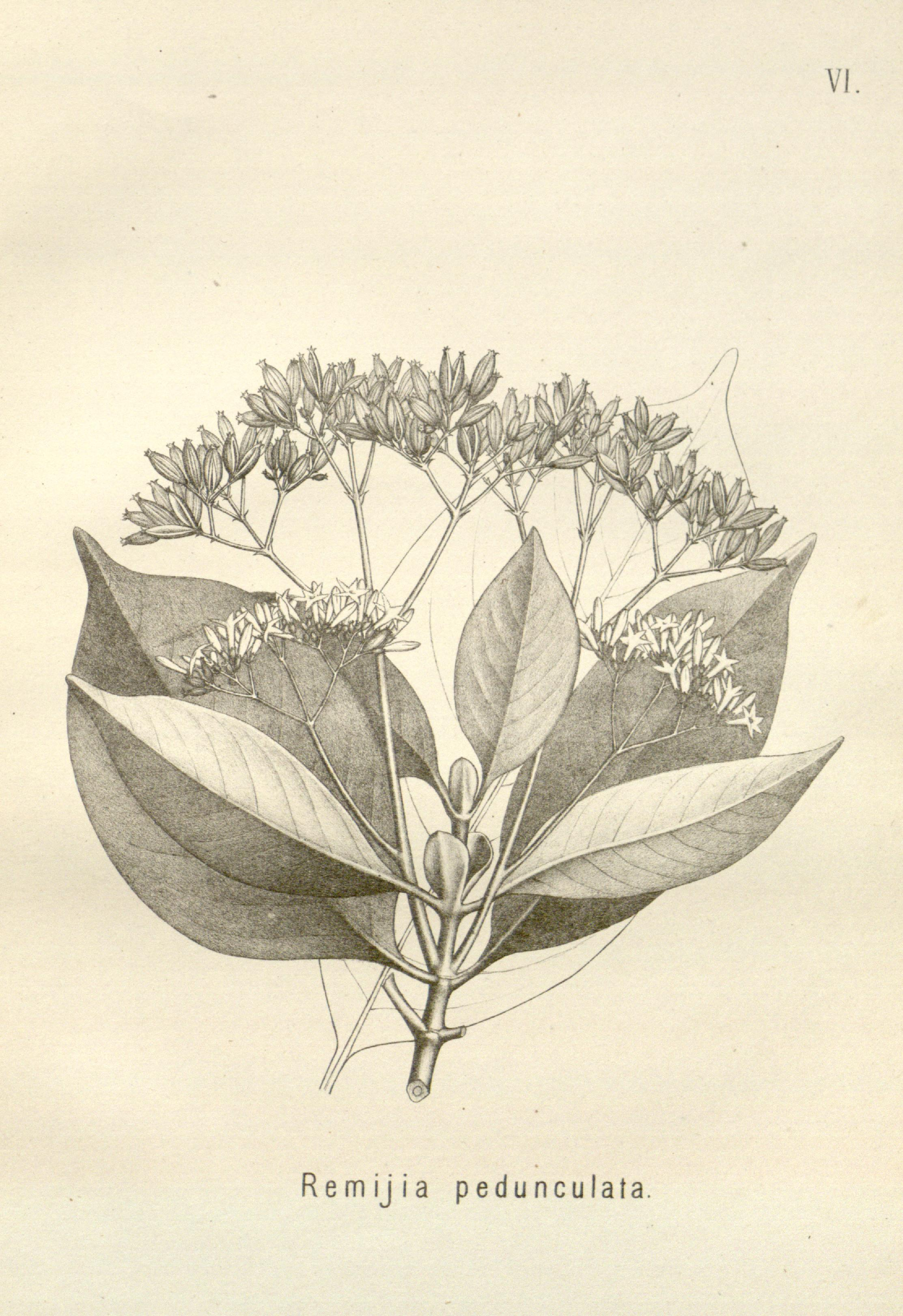
- Ciliosemina pedunculata

Scientific classification
- Kingdom: Plantae
- Clade: Tracheophytes
- Clade: Angiosperms
- Clade: Eudicots
- Clade: Asterids
- Order: Gentianales
- Family: Rubiaceae
- Subfamily: Cinchonoideae
- Tribe: Cinchoneae
- Genus: Ciliosemina; Antonelli

= Ciliosemina =

Genus of plants

Ciliosemina is a genus of flowering plants in the family Rubiaceae. There are two recognized species distributed in South America from the eastern Andes to the Amazon basin.

These are woody plants taking the form of shrubs or trees. The white flowers are borne in axillary inflorescences. The fruits are stiff capsules containing winged seeds.

== Species ==
- Ciliosemina pedunculata (H.Karst.) Antonelli - Venezuela, Colombia, Ecuador, Peru, Brazil
- Ciliosemina purdieana (Wedd.) Antonelli - Colombia
