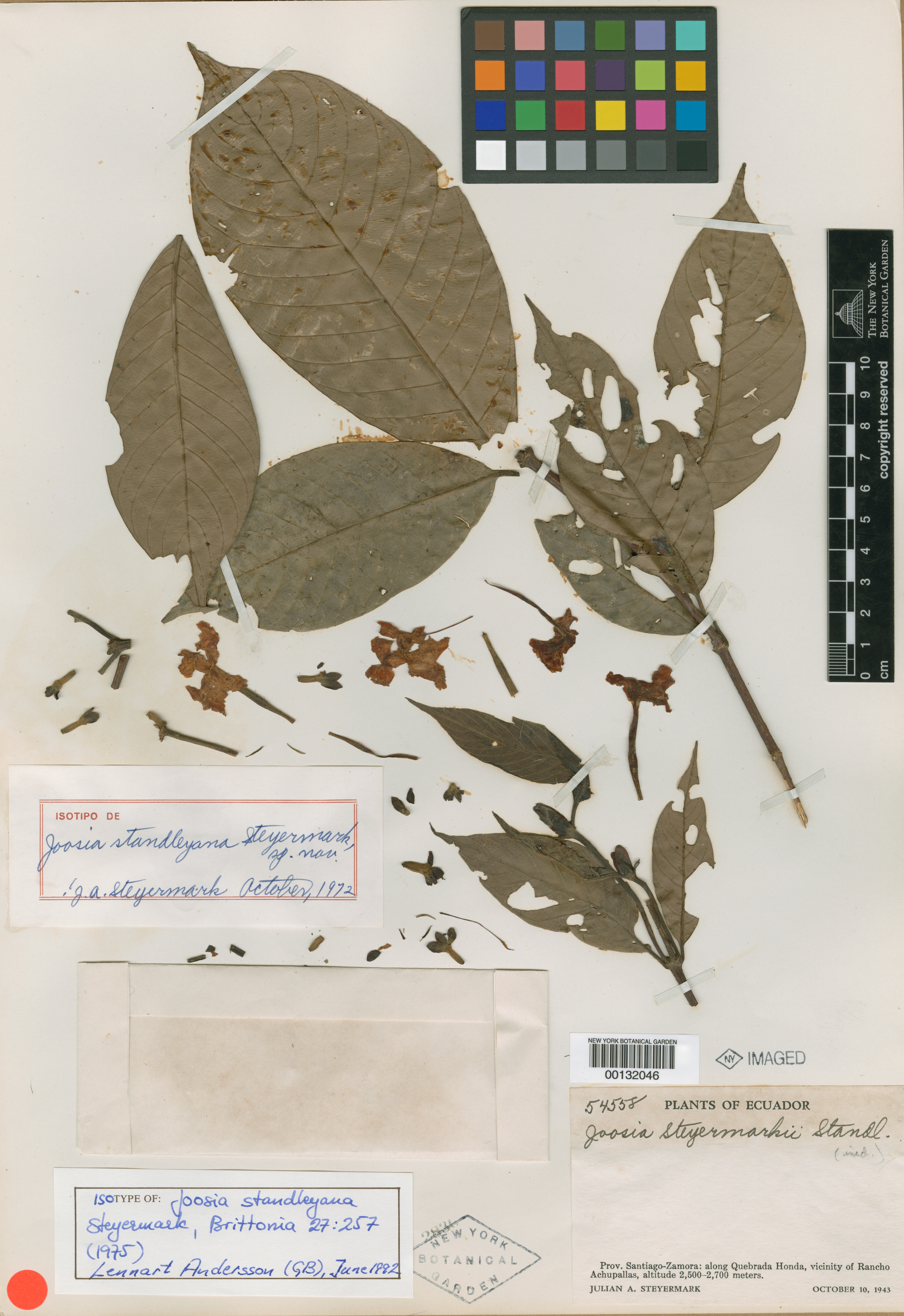

Conservation status
- Vulnerable (IUCN 3.1)

Scientific classification
- Kingdom: Plantae
- Clade: Embryophytes
- Clade: Tracheophytes
- Clade: Spermatophytes
- Clade: Angiosperms
- Clade: Eudicots
- Clade: Asterids
- Order: Gentianales
- Family: Rubiaceae
- Genus: Joosia
- Species: J. standleyana

Binomial name
- Joosia standleyana Steyerm.

= Joosia standleyana =

Species of plant

Joosia standleyana is a species of flowering plant in the family Rubiaceae. It is a small tree native to the Andes of southeastern Colombia, Ecuador, and northern and central Peru. It grows in montane tropical moist forests up to 2,700 metres elevation.

The species was described by Julian Alfred Steyermark in 1975.
