= Ladenbergia pavonii =

Conservation status
- Near Threatened (IUCN 3.1)

Scientific classification
- Kingdom: Plantae
- Clade: Tracheophytes
- Clade: Angiosperms
- Clade: Eudicots
- Clade: Asterids
- Order: Gentianales
- Family: Rubiaceae
- Genus: Ladenbergia
- Species: L. pavonii

Binomial name
- Ladenbergia pavonii (Lamb.) Standl.

Species of plant

Ladenbergia pavonii is a species of plant in the family Rubiaceae. It is endemic to Ecuador.
