= Beatrice Armari =

Italian botanist

- Born: 1877
- Died: 1918
- Occupation: Botanist
- Known for: The flora of Eritrea
- Spouse: Biagio Longo

Beatrice Armari (1877 – 1918) was an Argentine-Italian botanist and taxonomist noted for her study the flora of Eritrea. Her name appears with the North African species Arnebia lutea (A.Rich.) Armari.

Armari was married to fellow botanist Biagio Longo (1872-1950) who, like her, specialized in the large clade of spermatophytes.

The standard author abbreviation Armari is used to indicate this person as the author when citing a botanical name.

== Selected works ==
She published in the Yearbook of the Royal Botanical Institute in Rome.

- Armari, B. (1903). Contribuzione alla studio dell'influenza del clima e della stazione sopra la struttura delle piante della regione mediterranea. (Contribution to the study of the influence of climate and station on plant structure in the Mediterranean region.) Ann. Bot. Pirotta, I, 17–41.
- Pirotta, Romualdi (1903). Flora della colonia Eritrea (in Italian). Tip. E. Voghera.—chapters on Aizoaceae, Umbelliferae, Rubiaceae, and Borraginaceae.
