= Stilpnophyllum =

Scientific classification
- Kingdom: Plantae
- Clade: Tracheophytes
- Clade: Angiosperms
- Clade: Eudicots
- Clade: Asterids
- Order: Gentianales
- Family: Rubiaceae
- Subfamily: Cinchonoideae
- Tribe: Cinchoneae
- Genus: Stilpnophyllum; Hook.f.

Genus of plants

Stilpnophyllum is a genus of flowering plants in the family Rubiaceae. They are shrubs and trees native to South America. They occur in wet forest habitat.

Species include:

- Stilpnophyllum grandifolium
- Stilpnophyllum lineatum
- Stilpnophyllum oellgaardii
- Stilpnophyllum revolutum
