= Anna B. Nickels =

American botanist, botanical collector and plant nursery owner (1832-1917)

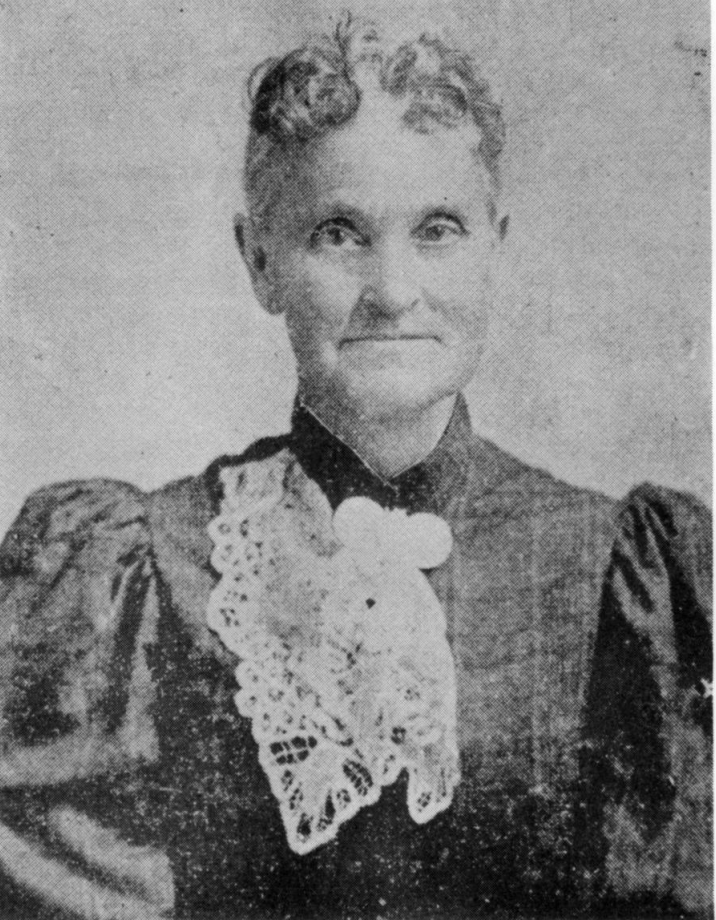
Anna B. Nickels

Anna Buck Nickels (born Ohio, June 10, 1832; died Corpus Christi, Texas, January 3, 1917) was an American cactus collector and florist. She was for many years one of the most important collectors, cultivators, and popularizers of the cactus of Mexico and southern Texas. The standard author abbreviation A.B.Nickels is used to indicate this person as the author when citing a botanical name.

== Personal life ==
Nickels was born Anna Buck Snell in Ohio; her parents moved the next year to Knox County, Illinois. The family purchased land in Victoria Township there in 1839. She was one of eight children of Appleton Snell (1786-1864) and his wife Elizabeth Hubbell Snell (1803-1899). Anna married her first husband, David Foote Eells (1826-1866), in 1854; they had two children, Benjamin H. Eells (1854-1933) and Irene Eells Vera (1857-1935). She married lawyer Peter Nickels (born circa 1824) in 1869.

== Career ==
By her own account, Nickels began collecting cactus around 1870 and travelled to many areas of Mexico in search of them. By 1876 she was publishing a printed catalog with a list of species that she had available from her private nursery in Laredo. According to a reviewer, she sent 287 species of cactus for her exhibit at the 1893 World's Columbian Exposition in Chicago, where they won the highest honors. In 1894 she found what was ultimately judged to be a new sub-species of Agave victoriae-reginae, now officially Agave victoriae-regina forma nickelsii. In 1900 Nickels provided cactus for a Mexican display at the Paris Exposition. Her cacti were distributed to various European nurseries after the Exposition and provided material for European botanists.

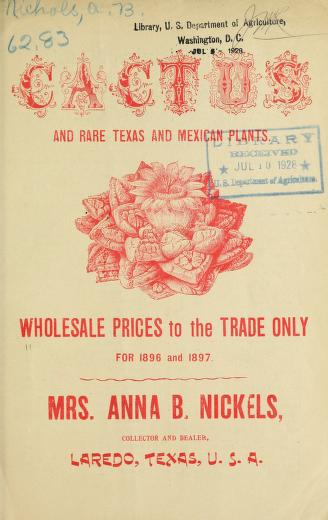
Cover of Anna B. Nickels' catalog for 1896-7

In 1895 Nickels discovered a new species of Cereus, now known as Grusonia bradtiana, which was named at her request after George Bradt, the editor of The Southern Florist and Gardener by botanist John Merle Coulter.

In 1908 William Safford wrote in the Smithsonian Report for that year that Nickels had one of the most important collections of cactus in the United States at her Laredo nursery. He also noted that her observations of native use of peyote as an intoxicant and a febrifuge were published by Coulter in his 1894 Preliminary Revision of the North American Species of Cactus, Anhalonium, and Lophophora, and mentioned that she had provided plant materials for chemists, drug manufacturers, florists, and botanists for many years. In a 1915 article on peyote Safford included a picture of Nickels and noted in the caption that she had "called attention to the narcotic properties of Lophophora, and supplied to Parke, Davis, & Co. material with which to investigate the drug."

The German botanist Max Gürke named a species Cereus nickelsii in her honor in 1910 (now Cephalocereus polylophus). The California botanist Mary Katharine Brandegee knew Nickels and named Mammillaria nickelsae (now Coryphantha nickelsiae) after her.

== An appreciation ==
The Southern Florist and Gardener published a picture of Nickels in its June 1898 issue with the following text: "It is with the greatest pleasure we present to our readers the picture of our esteemed friend, Mrs. Anna B. Nickels of Laredo, Texas. She is one of the most widely and favorably known among all of the cactus fraternity the world over, and surely none of us can look upon the kindly features of this pioneer collector without a keen desire to grasp the hand that has been busy so many years in giving all of us pleasure. Many more years of robust health and usefulness is the sincere wish of the "Corner", and we feel sure that in this, all who read these lines will join us. Mrs. Nickels has very likely the largest number of succulent plants in this country, and no one having the opportunity to spend a few hours in Laredo should fail to see our friend's cactus farm."

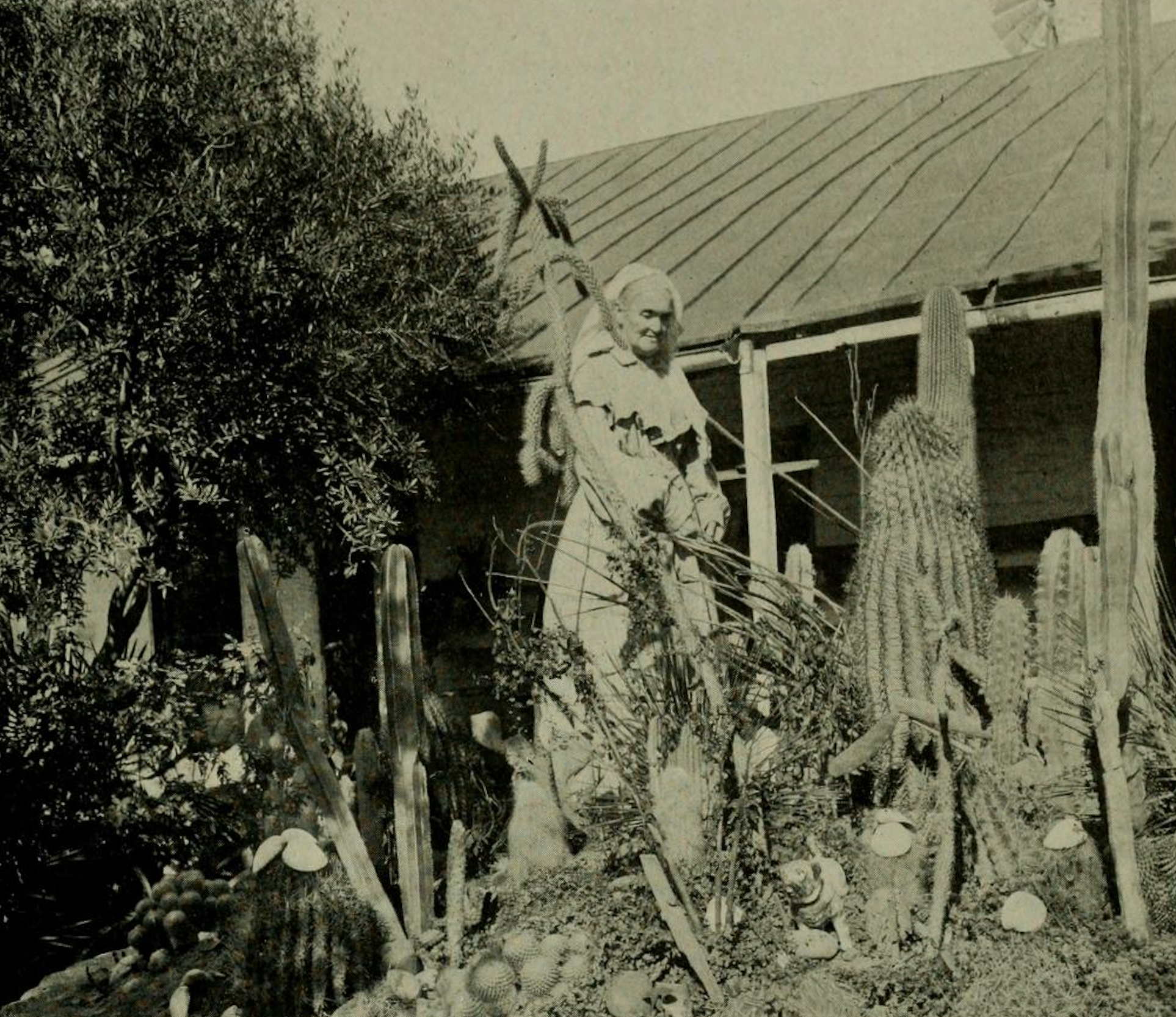
Anna B. Nickels in her cactus garden, from Safford's 1915 article
