= Stilpnophyllum grandifolium =

Conservation status
- Endangered (IUCN 3.1)

Scientific classification
- Kingdom: Plantae
- Clade: Tracheophytes
- Clade: Angiosperms
- Clade: Eudicots
- Clade: Asterids
- Order: Gentianales
- Family: Rubiaceae
- Genus: Stilpnophyllum
- Species: S. grandifolium

Binomial name
- Stilpnophyllum grandifolium L.Andersson

Species of plant

Stilpnophyllum grandifolium is a species of tree in the family Rubiaceae. It is endemic to southeastern Ecuador, where it is known from two subpopulations in the Nangaritza Canton, and is expected in Peru. It is not confirmed inside Ecuador's protected areas network, but collected near Podocarpus National Park. It is considered Endangered by habitat destruction related to disorganized colonization, mining, and deforestation.
