= Ladenbergia oblongifolia =

Scientific classification
- Kingdom: Plantae
- Clade: Tracheophytes
- Clade: Angiosperms
- Clade: Eudicots
- Clade: Asterids
- Order: Gentianales
- Family: Rubiaceae
- Genus: Ladenbergia
- Species: L. oblongifolia

Binomial name
- Ladenbergia oblongifolia (Humb. ex Mutis) L.Andersson

Synonyms
- Buena magnifolia (Ruiz & Pav.) Wedd.; Buena nitida (Benth.) Wedd.; Cascarilla caduciflora (Bonpl.) Wedd.; Cascarilla gavanensis Schltdl.; Cascarilla magnifolia (Ruiz & Pav.) Wedd.; Cascarilla nitida (Benth.) Wedd.; Cascarilla oblongifolia (Humb. ex Mutis) Wedd.; Cascarilla rostrata Wedd.; Cinchona caduciflora Bonpl.; Cinchona cuatrecasasii Standl. ex Steyerm.; Cinchona grandifolia Ruiz & Pav. ex Poir.; Cinchona heterocarpa H.Karst.; Cinchona lutescens Ruiz ex Vitman; Cinchona lutescens Vell., nom. illeg.; Cinchona magnifolia Ruiz & Pav.; Cinchona nitida Benth., nom. illeg.; Cinchona oblongifolia Humb. ex Mutis; Ladenbergia gavanensis (Schltdl.) Standl.; Ladenbergia magnifolia (Ruiz & Pav.) Klotzsch; Ladenbergia nitida (Benth.) Klotzsch

Species of plant

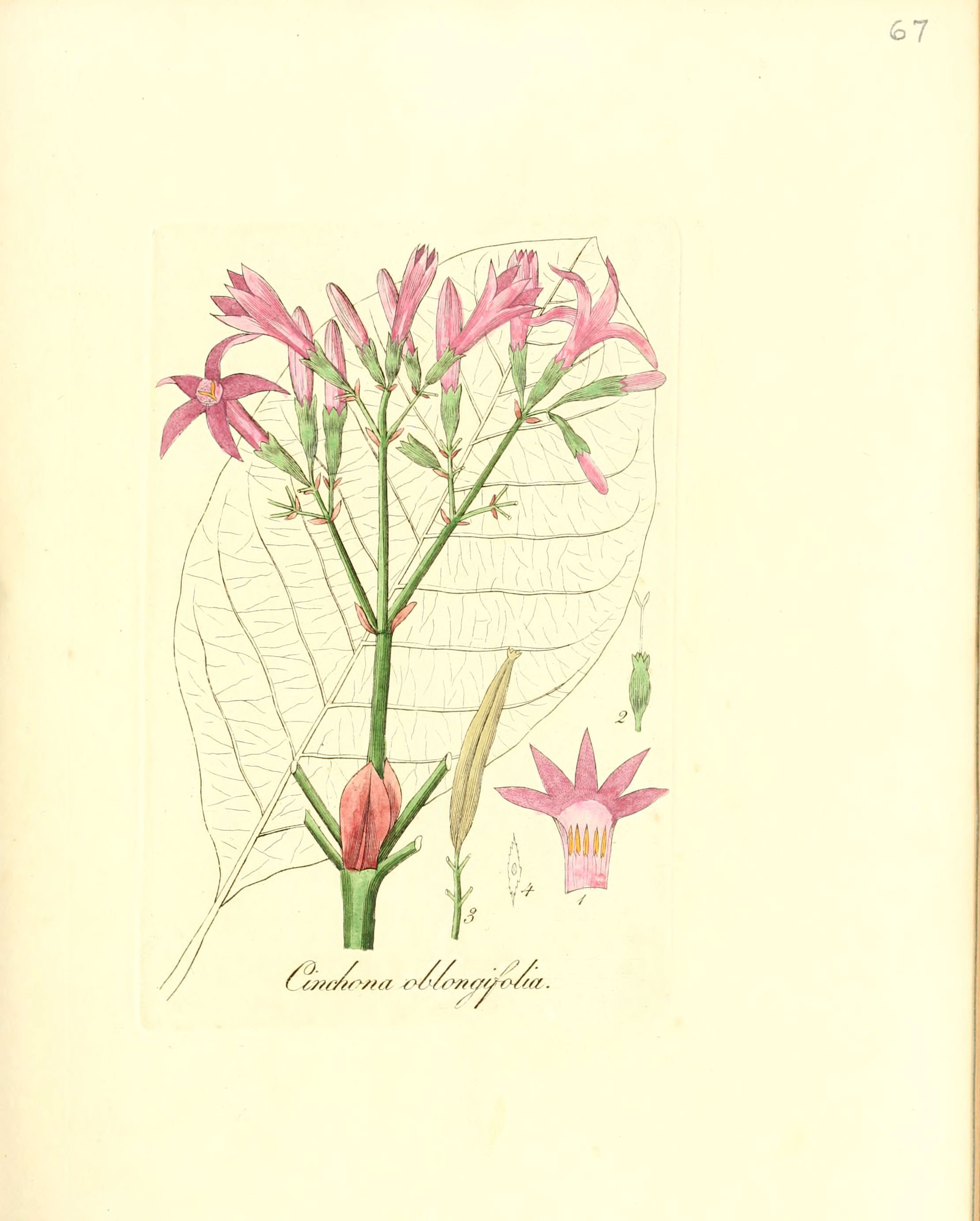
Ladenbergia oblongifolia

Ladenbergia oblongifolia, many synonyms, including Ladenbergia gavanensis, is a species of plant in the family Rubiaceae. It is native to the north-west of South America: Bolivia, northern Brazil, Colombia, Ecuador, Peru and Venezuela.

== Conservation ==
Ladenbergia gavanensis was assessed as "vulnerable" in the 1998 IUCN Red List, where it is said to be native only to Peru. As of February 2023, L. gavanensis was regarded as a synonym of Ladenbergia oblongifolia, which has a much wider distribution.
