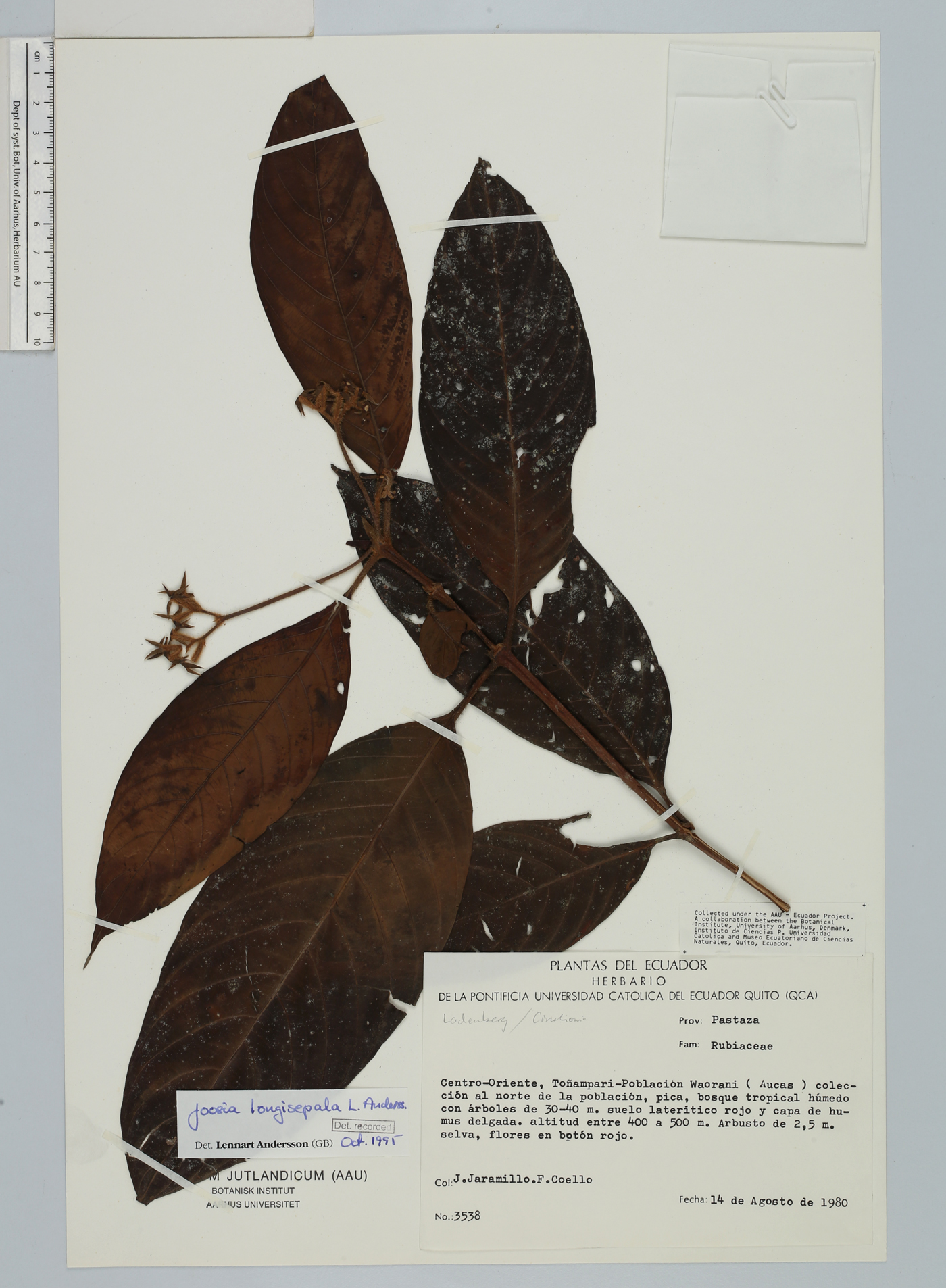

Conservation status
- Vulnerable (IUCN 3.1)

Scientific classification
- Kingdom: Plantae
- Clade: Tracheophytes
- Clade: Angiosperms
- Clade: Eudicots
- Clade: Asterids
- Order: Gentianales
- Family: Rubiaceae
- Genus: Joosia
- Species: J. longisepala

Binomial name
- Joosia longisepala L.Andersson

= Joosia longisepala =

Species of plant

Joosia longisepala is a species of plant in the family Rubiaceae. It is endemic to Ecuador.
