= Ladenbergia muzonensis =

Scientific classification
- Kingdom: Plantae
- Clade: Tracheophytes
- Clade: Angiosperms
- Clade: Eudicots
- Clade: Asterids
- Order: Gentianales
- Family: Rubiaceae
- Genus: Ladenbergia
- Species: L. muzonensis

Binomial name
- Ladenbergia muzonensis (Goudot) Standl.

Synonyms
- Buena hookeriana (Wedd.) Wedd.; Buena muzonensis (Goudot) Wedd.; Cascarilla hookeriana Wedd.; Cascarilla muzonensis (Goudot) Wedd.; Cinchona henleana H.Karst.; Cinchona henleana var. trichophylla Steyerm.; Cinchona hookeriana (Wedd.) H.Karst.; Cinchona muzonensis Goudot; Henlea muzonensis (Goudot) Klotzsch & H.Karst. ex Walp.; Henlea rosea Klotzsch & H.Karst. ex Walp.; Ladenbergia hookeriana (Wedd.) Standl.; Ladenbergia ulei Standl.; Rustia rosea (Klotzsch & H.Karst. ex Walp.) K.Schum.

Species of plant

Ladenbergia muzonensis, synonyms including Ladenbergia ulei, is a species of plant in the family Rubiaceae. It is native to north-western South America: Colombia, Ecuador, Peru and Venezuela.

== Conservation ==
Ladenbergia ulei was assessed as "vulnerable" in the 1998 IUCN Red List, where it is said to be native only to Peru. As of February 2023, L. ulei was regarded as a synonym of Ladenbergia muzonensis, which has a wider distribution.
