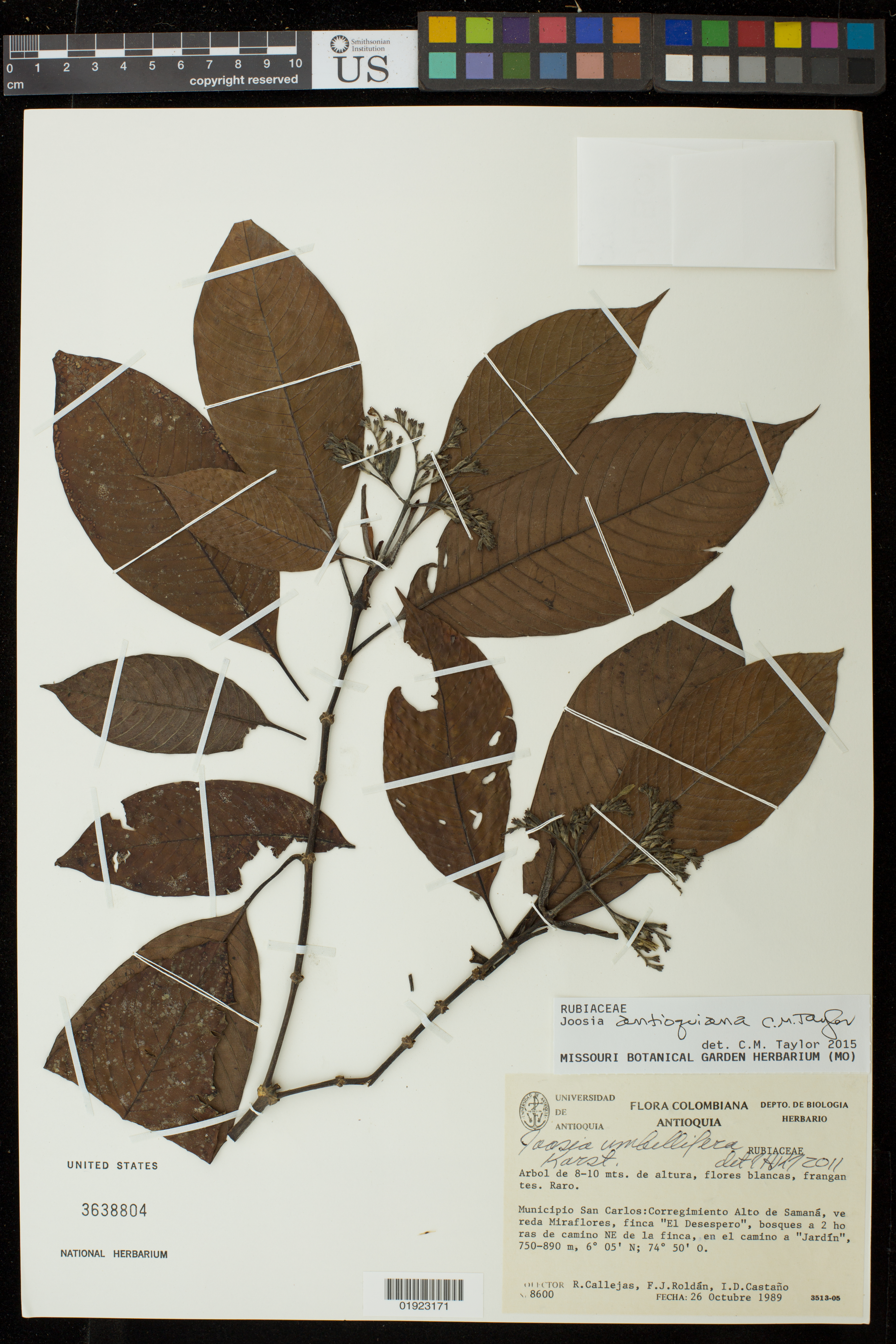

Scientific classification
- Kingdom: Plantae
- Clade: Tracheophytes
- Clade: Angiosperms
- Clade: Eudicots
- Clade: Asterids
- Order: Gentianales
- Family: Rubiaceae
- Subfamily: Cinchonoideae
- Tribe: Cinchoneae
- Genus: Joosia; H.Karst.

= Joosia =

Genus of plants

Joosia is a genus of flowering plants in the family Rubiaceae. There are at least 11 species. They are distributed from Costa Rica to Bolivia with the center of diversity in Ecuador.

== Species ==
As of March 2023, Plants of the World Online accepted the following species:

- Joosia aequatoria Steyerm.
- Joosia antioquiana C.M.Taylor
- Joosia capitata C.M.Taylor
- Joosia confusa C.M.Taylor
- Joosia dichotoma (Ruiz & Pav.) H.Karst.
- Joosia dielsiana Standl.
- Joosia frondosa C.M.Taylor
- Joosia longisepala L.Andersson
- Joosia loretensis (Standl.) C.M.Taylor
- Joosia macrocalyx Standl. ex Steyerm.
- Joosia obtusa L.Andersson
- Joosia oligantha L.Andersson
- Joosia panamensis Dwyer
- Joosia pulcherrima Steere
- Joosia sericea (Standl.) C.M.Taylor
- Joosia standleyana Steyerm.
- Joosia ulei Steyerm.
- Joosia umbellifera H.Karst.
