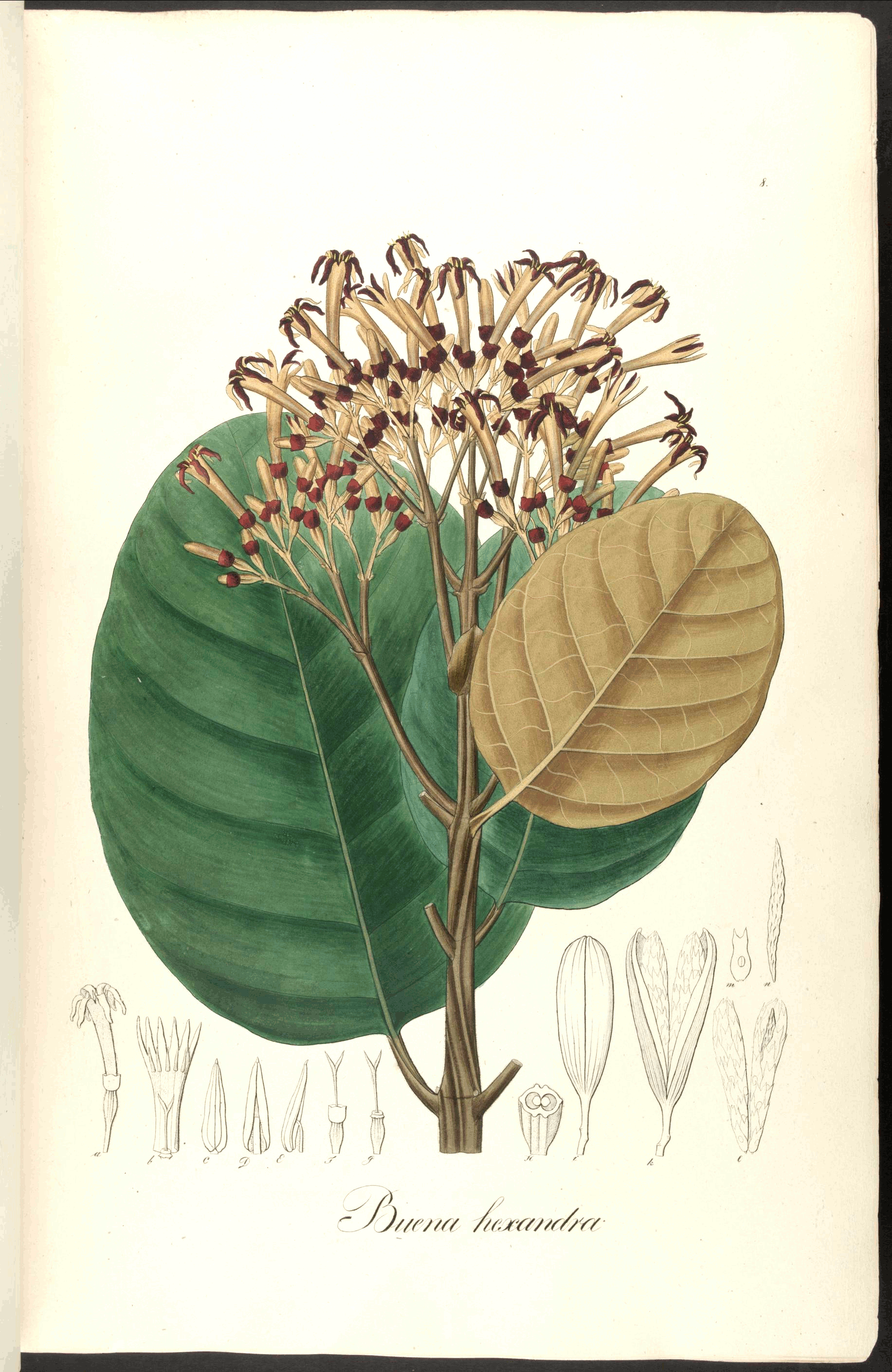
- Ladenbergia hexandra

Scientific classification
- Kingdom: Plantae
- Clade: Tracheophytes
- Clade: Angiosperms
- Clade: Eudicots
- Clade: Asterids
- Order: Gentianales
- Family: Rubiaceae
- Subfamily: Cinchonoideae
- Tribe: Cinchoneae
- Genus: Ladenbergia; Klotzsch

= Ladenbergia =

Genus of plants

Ladenbergia is a genus of plant in the family Rubiaceae.

== Species ==
As of March 2023, Plants of the World Online accepted the following species:

- Ladenbergia acutifolia (Ruiz & Pav.) Klotzsch
- Ladenbergia amazonensis Ducke
- Ladenbergia brenesii Standl.
- Ladenbergia bullata (Wedd.) Standl.
- Ladenbergia buntingii Steyerm.
- Ladenbergia carua (Wedd.) Standl.
- Ladenbergia chapadensis S.Moore
- Ladenbergia cujabensis Klotzsch
- Ladenbergia discolor K.Schum.
- Ladenbergia dwyeri L.Andersson
- Ladenbergia epiphytica L.Andersson
- Ladenbergia ferruginea Standl.
- Ladenbergia franciscana C.M.Taylor
- Ladenbergia graciliflora K.Schum.
- Ladenbergia heterophylla (Wedd.) Standl.
- Ladenbergia hexandra (Pohl) Klotzsch
- Ladenbergia klugii L.Andersson
- Ladenbergia lambertiana (A.Br. ex Mart.) Klotzsch
- Ladenbergia laurifolia Dwyer
- Ladenbergia lehmanniana L.Andersson
- Ladenbergia macrocarpa (Vahl) Klotzsch
- Ladenbergia magdalenae L.Andersson
- Ladenbergia moritziana Klotzsch
- Ladenbergia muzonensis (Goudot) Standl.
- Ladenbergia nubigena L.Andersson
- Ladenbergia oblongifolia (Humb. ex Mutis) L.Andersson
- Ladenbergia obovata L.Andersson
- Ladenbergia paraensis Ducke
- Ladenbergia pauciflora L.Andersson
- Ladenbergia pavonii (Lamb.) Standl.
- Ladenbergia pittieri Standl.
- Ladenbergia riveroana (Wedd.) Standl.
- Ladenbergia rubiginosa L.Andersson
- Ladenbergia shawistigma Chilq.
- Ladenbergia siranensis Chilq.
- Ladenbergia stenocarpa (Lamb.) Klotzsch
- Ladenbergia undata Klotzsch

=== Former species ===
- Ladenbergia gavanensis (Schltdl.) Standl. = Ladenbergia oblongifolia
- Ladenbergia ulei Standl. = Ladenbergia muzonensis
