= Timothy Field Allen =

American physician and botanist (1837–1902)

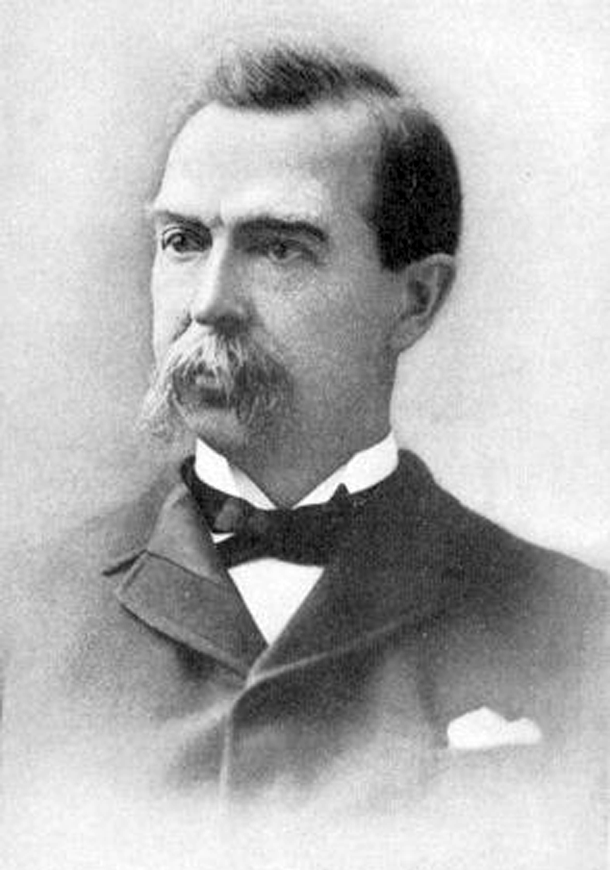
- Born: April 24, 1837; Westminster (town)
- Died: December 5, 1902; New York City
- Education: New York University, Amherst College
- Occupations: Botanist, medical doctor, surgeon's assistant, botanical collector
- Employer: New York Medical College (1867–)
- Awards: Doctor of Medicine (1885, Amherst College); Legum Doctor (1885, Amherst College)

Timothy Field Allen (April 24, 1837 – December 5, 1902) was an American physician and botanist.

Timothy Field Allen was born on April 24, 1837 in Westminster, Vermont. He graduated A. B. at Amherst College in 1858, and subsequently received the degree of A. M. from the same institution. He graduated M. D. in 1861 at the University of the City of New York and in the same year commenced practice at Brooklyn, N. Y. In 1862 he was an acting assistant surgeon in the United States Army, and in the following year established himself in New York City, which remained the field of his labors for nearly forty years. Becoming associated professionally with Dr. Carroll Dunham, he early adopted homeopathy, and soon rose to a prominent position among homeopathic practitioners.

In 1865 he received the degree of M.D. from the Homeopathic (Hahnemann) Medical College, of Philadelphia; two years later he became professor of materia medica in the New York Homeopathic College, and from 1882 was its dean. For many years he was surgeon to the New York Ophthalmic Hospital, and was largely instrumental in the establishment of the Laura Franklin Free Hospital for Children and the Flower Hospital, in New York City. He was one of the editors of the New York Journal of Homeopathy, 1873–75, and later edited an Encyclopedia of Pure Materia Medica in ten volumes, 1875–79; he was also the author of A Handbook of Materia Medica and Homeopathic Therapeutics, published at Philadelphia in 1879.

Early in his career he became a botanical enthusiast, and maintained his interest in this branch of scientific study in spite of his arduous professional work. He was one of the founders and curator of the Torrey Botanical Club; indeed, he is commonly credited with having been the first to suggest the organization of the Club under the name of New York Botanical Club, now one of the strongest scientific societies of New York City. He was the first to occupy the office of vice-president in the Club, and was re-elected annually until his death nearly thirty years later. Most of his contributions to botanical periodical literature appeared in the Bulletin of the Torrey Botanical Club, although there were several in other magazines, notably one in the American Naturalist for May, 1882.

As a scientist, Allen was best known for his work upon the Characeae. This difficult group of algae has attracted but few botanists, and for many years he was almost the only American student of these plants. His most important printed contribution to this subject was "The Characeae of America," issued in parts from 1888 to 1896. His "Contributions to Japanese Characeae," first printed in instalments in the Bulletin of the Torrey Botanical Club from 1894 to 1898, also appeared separately in pamphlet form. Both of these works were illustrated by beautiful plates by Evelyn Hunter Nordhoff. He edited the exsiccata series Characeae Americanae exsiccatae distributae a T. F. Allen M.D. (1880-1895) and Characeae Japonicae exsiccatae distributae a T. F. Allen M.D. (1895). By correspondence, by exchange, by purchase, and by paying the expenses of collectors in North America, South America, and Japan, Allen brought together one of the finest accumulations of specimens and books relating to the Characeae in existence; all these he presented to the New York Botanical Garden the year before his death, when failing health made it impossible for him to study them further. His botanical work was by no means confined entirely to the Characeae; several species of plants, named in his honor, bear witness to the breadth of his interest in botany, as the grass Danthonia alleni, Austin; Eriogonum allenii, S. Watson; Kneiffii allenii (Button), Small.

== Personal life ==
Dr. Allen married, June 3, 1862, Julia Bissell, of Litchfield, Connecticut. They had six children, one of whom became a physician in New York City.

== Death ==
Timothy Field Allen died on 5 December 1902 in New York City.

The standard author abbreviation Allen is used to indicate this person as the author when citing a botanical name.
