= Hermann Ambronn =

German botanist (1856-1927)

Ernst Ludwig Victor Hermann Ambronn (11 August 1856, Meiningen – 28 March 1927, Jena) was a German botanist and microscopist.

Ambronn studied at the universities of Heidelberg, Vienna and Berlin, where his instructors were Leopold Kny and Simon Schwendener. Following graduation (1880), he worked as an assistant to August Schenk in the botanical institute at Leipzig, where from 1882 to 1887, he was curator of the university herbarium. In 1889 he received the title of associate professor. During the 1880s, he also spent time conducting research in Trieste and at the zoological station in Naples.

In 1899 he relocated to the University of Jena, where he eventually attained the chair of scientific microscopy. While in Jena, in addition to his academic duties, he worked for several years as a research associate at the Carl-Zeiss-Stiftung.

Ambronn was the author of works in the fields of botany, microscopy and colloid chemistry. He is especially known for his studies involving the submicroscopic structure of birefringent substances of biological origin.

== Selected works ==
- Über einige Fälle von Bilateralität bei den Florideen, 1880 – A few cases of bilateralism in Florideae.
- Über Poren in den Aussenwänden von Epidermiszellen, 1882 – Concerning pores in the outer walls of epidermis cells.
- Anleitung zur Benutzung des Polarisationsmikroskops bei histologischen Untersuchungen, 1892 – How to use the polarizing microscope in histological investigations.
- Sechs pflanzenphysiologische abhandlungen (edition of Thomas Andrew Knight), 1895 – Six phytophysiological memoirs.
- Zur theorie der mikroskopischen Bilderzeugung nach Abbe (with Henry Siedentopf), 1913 – On the theory of microscopic imaging according to Ernst Abbe.
- Das Polarisationsmikroskop, seine Anwendung in der Kolloidforschung und in der Färberei (with Albert Frey-Wyssling), 1926 – The polarizing microscope, its application in colloid research and in staining.
