= Ladenbergia ferruginea =

Conservation status
- Vulnerable (IUCN 2.3)

Scientific classification
- Kingdom: Plantae
- Clade: Tracheophytes
- Clade: Angiosperms
- Clade: Eudicots
- Clade: Asterids
- Order: Gentianales
- Family: Rubiaceae
- Genus: Ladenbergia
- Species: L. ferruginea

Binomial name
- Ladenbergia ferruginea Standl.

Species of plant

Ladenbergia ferruginea is a species of plant in the family Rubiaceae. It is endemic to Peru.
