= Amal Amin =

Egyptian botanist

Amal Amin (born 1929) is an Egyptian botanist.

She participated in naming the following plants:

- Asteraceae Echinops taeckholmianus Amin
- Asteraceae Launaea subgen. Microrrhynchus (Less.) Amin ex Rech.f.
- Asteraceae Launaea subgen. Pseudosonchus Amin ex Rech.f.
- Asteraceae Launaea sect. Pseudosonchus (Amin ex Rech.f.) N.Kilian
- Asteraceae Launaea subgen. Zollikoferia (DC.) Amin ex Rech.f.
- Asteraceae Launaea brunneri (Webb) Amin ex Boulos
- Asteraceae Launaea exauriculata (Oliv. & Hiern) Amin ex Boulos
- Asteraceae Launaea polydichotoma (Ostenf.) Amin ex N.Kilian
- Asteraceae Launaea procumbens (Roxb.) Amin
- Asteraceae Launaea remotiflora (DC.) Amin ex Rech.f.
- Asteraceae Launaea rueppellii (Sch.Bip.) Amin ex Boulos
- Asteraceae Launaea taraxacifolia (Willd.) Amin ex C.Jeffrey

The species Launaea amal-aminiae is named after her.
