= Ana Rosa Flores =

Chilean botanist

Ana Rosa Flores Quiroz
- Born: 1953 (age 72–73); Chuquicamata, Chile
- Other names: Anita Flores; Anita Flores Watson
- Known for: Taxonomy of native Chilean plants
- Spouse: John Michael Watson
- Scientific career
- Fields: Botany
- Author abbrev. (botany): A.R.Flores

Ana Rosa “Anita” Flores Quiroz, also known as Anita Flores Watson (born 1953), is a Chilean botanist known for her work on the taxonomy of native plants.

== Biography ==
Flores graduated from the University of Chile's campus in La Serena, where she completed a review of the genus Puya in the Coquimbo Region. She developed an interest in collecting and preserving plants for herbarium collections while she was in secondary school. She has published numerous works on the taxonomy of native plants.

Flores is married to fellow botanist John Michael Watson, born in 1935. Together, they own the botanical nursery and seed business Flores & Watson Seeds. They have undertaken numerous specimen-collecting expeditions in Bolivia, Argentina, and Chile.

== Selected publications ==
- Watson, John Michael; Flores, Ana Rosa (2009). "A new and rare rosulate species of Viola (Violaceae) from Argentina". Phytotaxa. 2: 19–23.
