= List of invasive plant species in New York =

Numerous plants have been introduced to the US state of New York in the last four hundred years, and many of them have become invasive species which by definition compete with native plants and suppress the growth of indigenous populations.

== Classification ==
The identification and measurement of accelerated growth of particularly dangerous invasives has long been a subject of scientific study and data collection; the far ranging impact of invasive species spurred former New York State Governor Andrew Cuomo to allocate millions in funding to eradicate them. According to NYS Assembly Member Steve Englebright, Chair of the Assembly Environmental Conservation Committee, “Invasive plant and animal species are a significant threat to New York’s remarkable biodiversity with the potential to severely impact our forests, as well as our state’s agricultural and tourism economies."

Invasive species are often grouped by threat levels that vary from county to county from very high impact to remarkable increased growth. The list of invasive plants below is by no means comprehensive but nearly every species listed is scientifically proven to have detrimental impacts on native habitats and wildlife, including native birds in New York State. Plants are listed in Latin name order and level of threat. Since plants do not recognize any boundaries, many pose threats in neighboring states like Connecticut and New Jersey as well.

Current lists of invasive species in New York are maintained by various PRISMs (Partnership for Regional Invasive Species Management). There are 8 PRISMs in New York State.

== Invasive terrestrial plants and trees ==
"Very High"

- Acer platanoides - Norway maple. This species is ranked 82.0 (Very High) on the NYS Threat Assessment scale.
- Ailanthus altissima— Tree of heaven. This species is ranked 84.44 (Very High) on the NYS Threat Assessment scale.
- Alliaria petiolata - Garlic mustard. This species is ranked 84.00 (Very High) on the NYS Threat Assessment scale.
- Aralia elata - Japanese angelica tree. This species is ranked 80.46 (Very High) on the NYS Threat Assessment scale.
- Berberis thunbergii - Japanese barberry. This species is ranked 91.0 (Very High) on the NYS Threat Assessment scale.
- Celastrus orbiculatus - Asian bittersweet. This species is ranked 86.67 (Very High) on the NYS Threat Assessment scale.
- Elaeagnus umbellata - Autumn olive. This species is ranked 94 (Very High) on the NYS Threat Assessment scale.
- Euonymus alatus - Burning bush. New York allows the sale of this plant if it is labeled invasive. Sterile cultivars have also been developed. This species is ranked 81.25 (Very High) on the NYS Threat Assessment scale.
- Fallopia japonica - Japanese knotweed. This species is ranked 97.94 (Very High) on the NYS Threat Assessment scale.
- Lonicera japonica - Japanese honeysuckle
- Lonicera maackii - Bush honeysuckle. This species is ranked 84.50 (Very High) on the NYS Threat Assessment scale.
- Lythrum salicaria - Purple loosestrife. This species is ranked 91.0 (Very High) on the NYS Threat Assessment scale.
- Microstegium vimineum - Japanese stiltgrass. This species is ranked 85 (Very High) on the NYS Threat Assessment scale.
- Miscanthus sinensis - Chinese silvergrass.
- Persicaria perfoliata - Mile-a-minute
- Phragmites australis - Common reed grass. This species is ranked 92.00 (Very High) on the NYS Threat Assessment scale.
- Ranunculus ficaria - Lesser celandine. This species is ranked 85.56 (Very High) on the NYS Threat Assessment scale.
- Rhodotypos scandens - Jetbead.
- Rosa multiflora - Multiflora rose. This species is ranked 89.0 (Very High) on the NYS Threat Assessment scale.
- Rubus phoenicolasius - Wineberry. This species is ranked 85.56 (Very High) on the NYS Threat Assessment scale.
- Vincetoxicum rossicum - Pale swallow-wort

"High"

- Ampelopsis glandulosa— Porcelain berry. This species is ranked 71.26 (High) on the NYS Threat Assessment scale.
- Centaurea maculosa— Spotted knapweed. This species is ranked 78.89 (High) on the NYS Threat Assessment scale.
- Cirsium arvense— Canada or creeping thistle. This species is ranked 71.00 (High) on the NYS Threat Assessment scale.
- Pyrus calleryana - Callery pear. This species is ranked 50.00 (Moderate) on the NYS Threat Assessment Scale.

== Invasive aquatic or submerged plants ==
"Very High"

- Cabomba caroliniana - Fanwort
- Hydrilla verticillata - Hydrilla.
- Myriophyllum spicatum - Milfoil
- Potamogeton crispus - Curly leaf pondweed
- Trapa natans - Water chestnut.

== See also ==
- Invasive species in the United States
