= Antonio da Costa Paiva =

- Baron of Castelo de Paiva
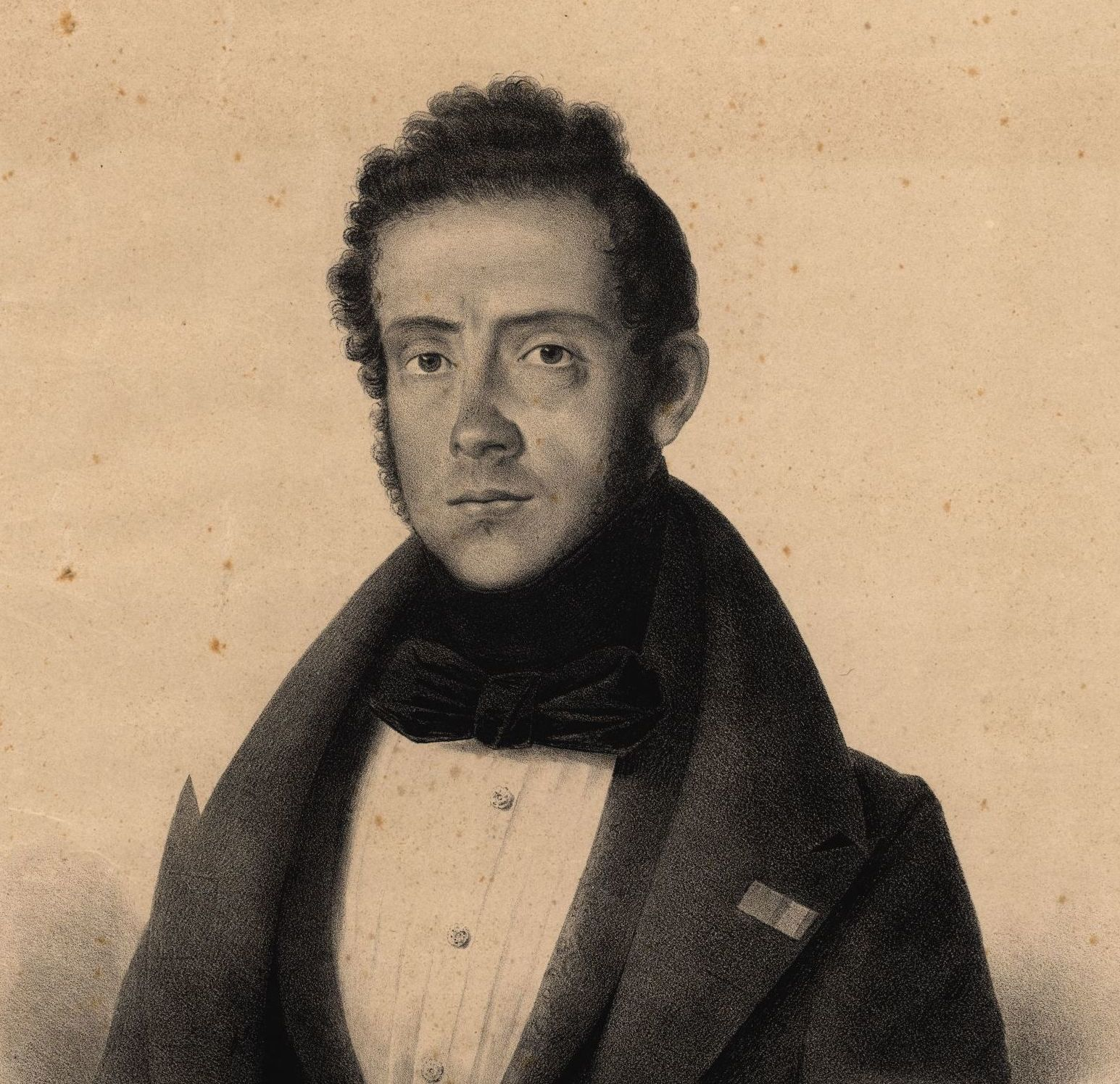

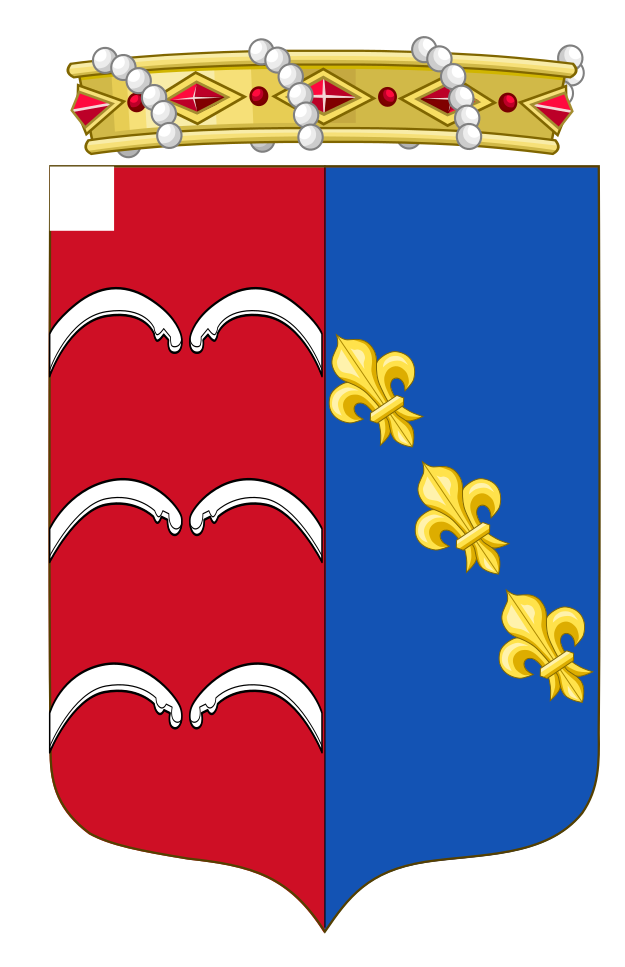
- Coat of arms
- Tenure: 5 April 1854 - 18 June 1879
- Predecessor: Title Created
- Successor: Title Abolished (Life Peerage)
- Born: 12 October 1806; Porto
- Died: 18 June 1879 (aged 72); Funchal
- Father: Manuel José da Nóbrega
- Mother: Maria do Carmo da Costa
- Occupation: Botanist, naturalist, doctor, teacher

António da Costa Paiva, Baron of Castelo de Paiva, CvC, CvNSC (Porto, 12 October 1806 - São Pedro, Funchal, 4 June 1879) was a Portuguese botanist, naturalist, doctor, teacher and nobleman. He was also the first director of the Porto Botanical Garden. The botanical author abbreviation attributed to him by the International Plant Names Index is A.Paiva.

== Biography ==
He was born in Porto on 12 October 1806, the son of Manuel José da Nóbrega, a native of Castelo de Paiva, a merchant in Porto, and his wife, Maria do Carmo da Costa, daughter of Manuel Alves da Costa and Maria Angélica.

=== Academic career ===
He attended the University of Coimbra, taking a bachelor's degree in Philosophy. He then continued his studies at the University of Paris, where he obtained a doctorate in Medicine, after defending a thesis on pulmonary tisicosis, written during the exile to which he was forced by his liberal ideals. When he was able to return to Portugal, he practised in private practice.

Between 1834 and 1836 he taught Rational and Moral Philosophy at the Royal Academy of Marine and Commerce in Porto. He was appointed Professor of Agriculture and Botany at this Academy by decree of 20 October 1836 and royal letter patent of 3 January 1837. In that year, with the reform of the Royal Academy of Marine and Commerce and the creation of the Polytechnic Academy of Porto, he became the first proprietor of the tenth chair, Botany, Agriculture, Metallurgy and Mining Art, and held this position between 1838 and 1858. He was appointed the first director of the Botanical Garden of Porto, by decree of 11 January and royal letter patent of 28 July 1838, and held this position between 1838 and 1855.

=== Botanist and naturalist ===
António da Costa Paiva was a remarkable naturalist, and this branch of the philosophical-natural sciences was the one to which he dedicated himself most. Academically sidelined by an attack of pulmonary tuberculosis, he sought treatment on Madeira and was later jubilated with the rank of professor by decree of 31 December 1858 and royal letter patent of 19 January 1859. When his health recovered, he began an intense scientific exploration of the Macaronesian islands, particularly the archipelagos of Madeira, the Canary Islands and Cape Verde, where he studied insects and molluscs, discovering new species in the company of distinguished scientists such as John Edward Gray and Vernon Wollaston. The collections he gathered were later studied by Bernardino António Gomes and Barbosa du Bocage.

Castelo de Paiva offered the Royal Academy of Sciences in Lisbon a valuable demonstration of his love for botany and his desire to enrich that establishment: the donation of a well-organised Madeiran herbarium, the fruit of his continuous botanical excursions to Madeira. This collection consists of six hundred species indigenous to the archipelago. To this gift he added another herbarium of 372 species also observed and collected by him in the Canary Islands, and a complete collection of terrestrial and fluvial molluscs from the Madeiran archipelago. He also gave the University of Coimbra Museum a collection of terrestrial, fluvial and maritime molluscs from Madeira and the Canary Islands, as well as a leaflet describing new species of coleoptera and terrestrial molluscs discovered by the same baron. For the Royal Gardens of Kew, in England, he also gave a copious herbarium of natural plants from mainland Portugal, and other indigenous plants from the Azores islands, most of which he had collected and co-ordinated, and which was gratefully accepted by the respective director, Sir W. J. Kooker, to be placed with the other herbaria kept there from all regions of the globe.

In 1855, the government commissioned him to study the island of Madeira from an agricultural and economic point of view, and he published his report. He also studied the fauna and flora of Madeira and the Canaries, publishing in 1860, 1861, 1862 and 1866, in Portuguese, French and English, various species classified there. When the Superior Council of Public Instruction was organised, the Baron of Castelo de Paiva was appointed its member.

He was a professor at the Polytechnic Academy of Oporto, a full member of the Royal Academy of Sciences and the Society of Medical Sciences of Lisbon; an honorary member of the Institute of Coimbra, a member of the General Council of Public Instruction, Commerce, Agriculture and Manufacturing, and the Dramatic Council. He belonged to the following foreign scientific organisations: corresponding member of the Imperial Academy of Medicine of Rio de Janeiro, the Academy of Medicine and Surgery of Toulouse, the Academy of Medicine of Montpellier and the Academy of Medicine of Marseille, of which he was a corresponding member; the Zoological Society of London, the Natural History Society of Kassel, Germany; the Society of Natural Sciences of Strasbourg, the Botanical Societies of France and Edinburgh, the Acclimatisation Societies of Prussia and France, among others. He was an extraordinary member of the General Council for Public Instruction until it was abolished in 1868.

=== Titles and honours ===
Throughout his career, António da Costa de Paiva was honoured with various titles and honorary positions. In 1836 he was awarded the rank of Knight of the Order of Christ and in the Order of Our Lady of the Conception of Vila Viçosa. By decree of King Pedro V of Portugal dated 5th April 1854, and a letter dated 19th April 1854, he was granted the title of Baron of Castelo de Paiva.

=== Death and legacy ===
António da Costa Paiva died as a single man, shortly after midnight on 4 June 1879, at his home in Travessa das Capuchinhas, formerly Travessa das Mercês, in the parish of São Pedro, in Funchal, on the island of Madeira. The body was embalmed and then taken to the old Angústias Cemetery, where it awaited transport to mainland Portugal. The funeral took place on 6 June, from St Peter's Church to the cemetery.

On his death he bequeathed his entire fortune, which was very large, to pious and charitable establishments, hospitals, scientific and cultural associations and educational establishments. To the Polytechnic Academy of Porto he donated an inscription of the Portuguese Public Debt in the amount of 1000$00 reis, for the benefit of the Porto Botanical Garden. In 1879, he left 1 conto de reis to the Porto Academy of Fine Arts for the creation of a prize to be awarded to the best biblically-themed painting in the Academy's triennial exhibition.

He also established a legacy, the Legacy of the Baron of Castelo de Paiva, at the Medical-Surgical School of Porto: ‘Upon my death, the property of this inscription belongs to the Medical-Surgical School of the city of Porto to serve as a prize for its annual interest to the student of the same School who shows the most skill in surgical operations, or in anatomical dissections of the human body; reserving for myself the right to receive the interest as long as I live. Funchal, 22nd October 1874’.

In 2017, the Rotary Club, the Castelo de Paiva City Council and the Faculty of Medicine of the University of Porto signed a protocol to award an annual prize, the Barão de Castelo de Paiva Prize, totalling 250 euros, to the student at the Faculty of Medicine of Porto with the highest classification in all the Anatomy subjects, with the aim of rewarding academic merit in this branch of the study of medicine.

In Castelo de Paiva there is a street Barão António da Costa Paiva, and in Monção street Barão de Castelo de Paiva, both named in his honour.

=== Literary work ===
He began publishing literary works in 1836, with an extensively annotated translation of Voltaire's novels.

In 1838, together with his colleague at the Polytechnic Academy of Porto, Diogo Kopke (1805–1875), he undertook the publication of the Roteiro da viagem de Vasco da Gama, attributed to Álvaro Velho, after having published in 1837 in Lisbon, together with Alexandre Herculano, the Crónica d'El-Rei D. Sebastião, by Friar Bernardo da Cruz, two manuscripts of great use for the study of the history of Portugal. In 1860 he published a second edition of ‘Roteiro da Viagem de Vasco da Gama’, together with Alexandre Herculano.

In 1838, he also published an aphorism on practical surgery and medicine in Porto, and was an appreciated writer in both the medical sciences and literature.

Camilo Castelo Branco wrote about his work: ‘The form, the wording, is of such good Portuguese quality that you can only recognise the vernacular of the author of the Soliloquies among the very Lusitanian pages of the author of the Novissimos, who stands as high as the oratorio (Fr Manuel Bernardes), whose devout book we have that is identical in tenor and title."

In his work ‘Os Fidalgos da Casa Mourisca’, Júlio Dinis refers to the Baron of Castelo de Paiva in relation to a lively dialogue on Phrenology, Metaphysics and Philosophy that he had with a German who was the administrator of the noble House of Ornelas in Madeira.

Having converted to Christianity in 1851, in the last years of his life he wrote a two-volume moral work entitled ‘The New or Last Ends of Man’, in which, in a preliminary warning, he declared that he had written this book to rid himself of the remorse that tormented him for having been an obstinate atheist.

Published work:

- Relatório do barão do Castelo de Paiva, encarregado pelo governo de estudar o estado da ilha da Madeira sob as relações agrícola. e económica, Lisbon, 1855;
- Descrição de dois novos insectos coleópteros do Camboja, dedicada a ss. mm. os senhores D. Pedro V e D. Fernando II, Lisbon, 1860;
- Descrição de duas espécies novas de coleópteros das ilhas Canárias, dedicadas a dois naturalistas ingleses F. V. Wallaston e R. T. Lowe, Lisbon, 1861;
- Descrição de duas espécies novas de coleópteros originários de Angola, seguida de outras duas, igualmente novas, também de Angola, por F. V. Wallaston. (Aquelas dedicadas aos naturalistas Dr. Welwitsch e S. Bertherot); in Gazeta Médica de Lisboa, n 11, of 1862;
- Notícia da descoberta de dois moluscos novos, e também dos tipos vivos de duas espécies fosseis do arquipélago madeirense; published in London in the Annals and Magazine of Nat. Hist., August 1862;
- Description of a new Sempervivum from the Salvage lsland by the Baron do Castelo de Paiva, dedictate to R. T. Lowe, published in the Seeman's Journal of Botany, London, 1866;
- Description de dix espéces nouvelles de mollusques terrestres de l'archipel de Madére; no Journal de Conchyliologie, published under the direction of MM. Crosse et Fischer, Paris, tome vi, nº 4, 1866; pp. 339 to 343;
- Monographia molluscorum terrestrium, fluvialium, lacustrium insularium Madereusium, Olysipone, 1867.
- Biographia (1877)
