= Alexandre Antonelli =

Brazilian scientist

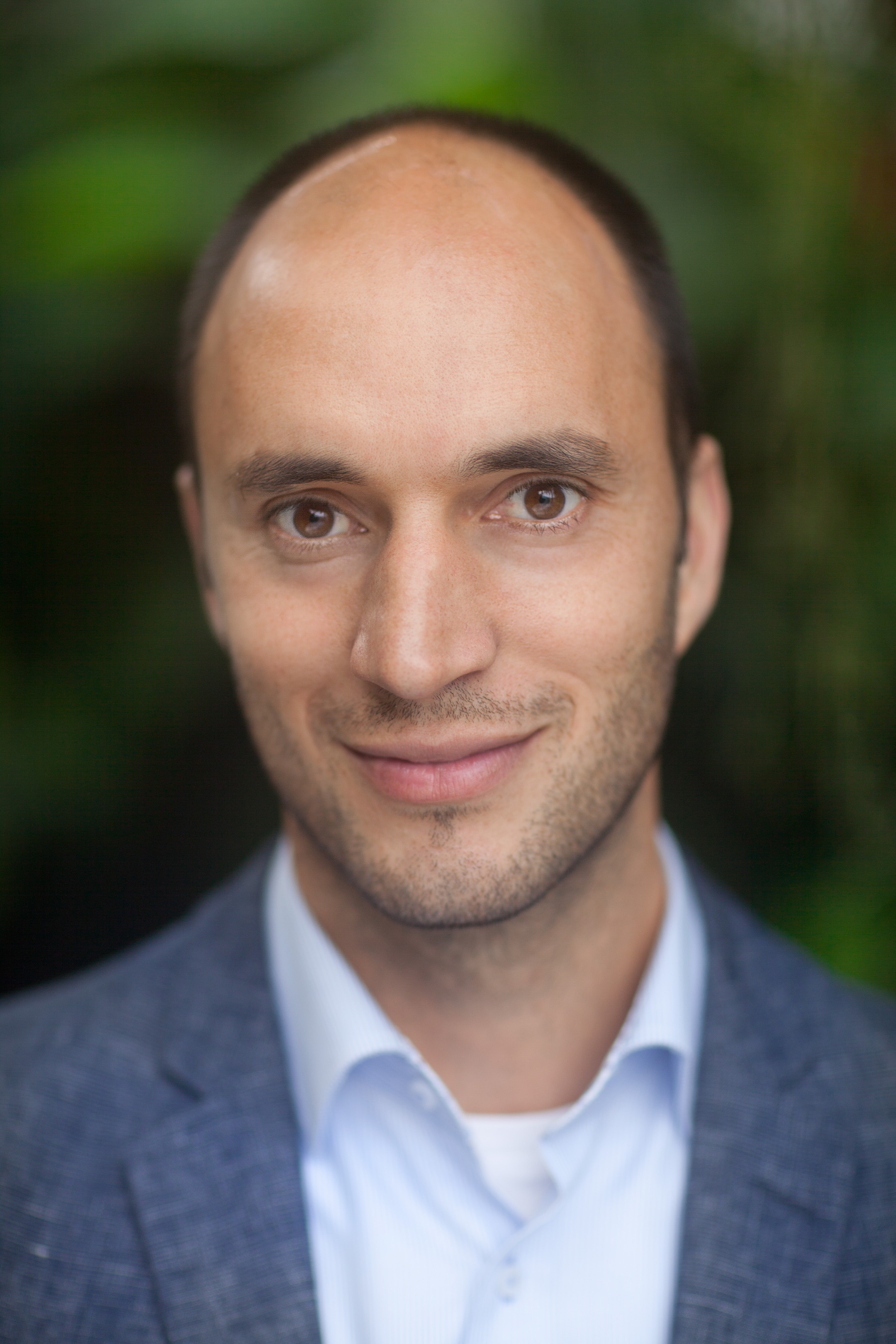
- Born: August 15, 1978; Campinas, Brazil
- Education: Universidade Estadual de Campinas; University of Geneva; University of Gothenburg (MSc, PhD)
- Known for: Director of Science at Kew Gardens, neotropical biodiversity research, state of the World's Plants and Fungi reports; The Hidden Universe (2022)
- Children: 3
- Awards: Web of Science Highly Cited Researcher (2020–2023)
- Scientific career
- Fields: Biodiversity, systematics, evolution, conservation
- Workplaces: Royal Botanic Gardens, Kew; University of Gothenburg; University of Oxford; Harvard University
- Thesis: Spatiotemporal Evolution of Neotropical Organisms: New Insights into an Old Riddle (2009)

Alexandre Antonelli (born 15 August 1978) is a Brazilian scientist and academic who serves as Executive Director of Science at the Royal Botanic Gardens, Kew, UK, Professor of Biodiversity and Systematics at the University of Gothenburg, Sweden, and Visiting Professor at the University of Oxford. He studies the diversity, evolution and distribution of life on Earth and how best to protect and sustainably use it. His first popular science book, The Hidden Universe: Adventures in Biodiversity, was published in July 2022. It served as inspiration for the founding of two non-profits under the umbrella of the Hidden Universe: Biodiversity, or HUB Initiative, hosting the Atlantic Forest Research and Conservation Alliance.

== Biography ==
Antonelli was born and raised in Campinas, Brazil, and began his undergraduate studies in biology at the State University of Campinas, Brazil and the University of Geneva, Switzerland. From there, he went on to complete an MSc in Biology at the University of Gothenburg, Sweden, which was awarded in 2003. He remained at the university to pursue a PhD entitled Spatiotemporal Evolution of Neotropical Organisms: New Insights into an Old Riddle, awarded in 2009. Since then, he has held a number of prestigious scientific positions, including postdoctoral fellow at the Institute of Systematic Botany, University of Zurich, Switzerland, Associate Professor and Senior Lecturer at the University of Gothenburg, Cisneros Visiting Scholar at Harvard University, USA, Science Advisor at the Universeum Science Centre, Gothenburg, and Scientific Curator at Gothenburg Botanical Garden. In 2017, Antonelli founded the Gothenburg Global Biodiversity Centre and was the Director until 2019 when he moved to the Royal Botanic Gardens, Kew, to take up his current position as Director of Science. He was also the founder and chairman (2015-2020) of knowme.earth, a mobile platform for logging, identifying, and sharing information about all species on Earth.

Antonelli met his Swedish wife Anna while they were both living in Honduras. They have three children together.

== Research ==
Antonelli studies the diversity, distribution, evolution, threats and sustainable uses of species and develops methods to speed up scientific discovery and innovation. His work focuses on the tropics, where most species occur and the threats are most acute. He is also known for his work illuminating the links between climate, geology, and biodiversity, with a particular focus on the origins, evolution and maintenance of mountain diversity. Antonelli has also written widely on the biodiversity of the tropical belt in the American continent, a region encompassing most of Latin America and the Caribbean called the Neotropics. In December 2022, he co-led two sister reviews in Science on the biodiversity of Madagascar. As part of his mutlidisciplinary research, he has been exploring the application of machine learning techniques for biodiversity research and conservation. In 2020 and 2023, Antonelli led the State of the World's Plants and Fungi report, a major international collaboration with an associated symposium.

He has been named on the Web of Science / Clarivate 'Highly Cited Researchers' list, which identifies pioneering researchers in the top 1% of their field, every year since 2020.

== Plant species named ==
Antonelli's taxonomic work has led to the scientific description of the following new plant species:

- Ciliosemina Antonelli (Rubiaceae)
- Ciliosemina pedunculata (H.Karst.) Antonelli (Rubiaceae)
- Ciliosemina purdieana (Wedd.) Antonelli (Rubiaceae)
- Cordiera montana C. H. Perss., Delprete & Antonelli (Rubiaceae)

Two species have also been named in his honour:

- Siphocampylus antonellii Lagom. & D. Santam. (Campanulaceae)
- Camaridium antonellii O.Pérez & Bogarín (Orchidaceae)

== Distinctions and awards ==
- Elected to the WWF International Board of Trustees
- Elected Member of Academia Europaea (2024-)
- Elected Foreign Fellow of the Royal Swedish Academy of Sciences (2023-lifetime)
- Visiting Professor, Wuhan Botanical Garden, Chinese Academy of Sciences (2023–2028)
- Distinguished Scientist of the Chinese Academy of Sciences, President's International Fellowship Initiative (2023)
- Elected member of the Convention on Biological Diversity's Informal Advisory Group on Technical and Scientific Cooperation
- International Advisory Panel on Biodiversity Credits (2023-)
- Elected Fellow of the Royal Geographical Society (2023-)
- Awarded Senckenberg Prize for Nature Research (2022)
- Fellow of the Royal Society of Biology (2020-)
- Awarded 1st Prize (with collaborators) in the GBIF Ebbe Nielsen Challenge (2020 and 2021) and 2nd prize (2016)
- Cisneros Visiting Scholar, David Rockefeller Center for Latin American Studies, Harvard University (2018)
- Named as one of Sweden's 100 coolest researchers (2017)
- Elected member of the Young Academy of Sweden (2016-2019)
- Elected fellow of the Royal Society of Arts and Sciences in Gothenburg (2016-)
- Future Research Leader, Swedish Foundation for Strategic Research (2016)
- Wallenberg Academy Fellow, Knut and Alice Wallenberg Foundation (2014)
- Elected Fellow of the Young Academy of Europe (2013–2020)
