= Pimentelia (plant) =

Scientific classification
- Kingdom: Plantae
- Clade: Tracheophytes
- Clade: Angiosperms
- Clade: Eudicots
- Clade: Asterids
- Order: Gentianales
- Family: Rubiaceae
- Genus: Pimentelia; Wedd.

Genus of plants

Pimentelia is a genus of flowering plants belonging to the family Rubiaceae.

Its native range is Peru.

Species:

- Pimentelia glomerata Wedd.
