= Anton Ausserdorfer =

Austrian clergyman and botanical collector

Anton Ausserdorfer (11 March 1836, in Anras – 16 September 1885, in Hall, Tirol) was an Austrian clergyman and botanical collector.

He served as a curate in Windisch-Matrei, and was a good friend of fellow clergyman/botanist Rupert Huter (1834–1919). He collected mainly in South Tyrol.

Plants with the specific epithet of ausserdorferi are named in his honor, an example being the grass species Avenastrum ausserdorferi.

== Associated works ==
- Katalog zum Herbar des Abiturienten Anton Außerdorfer : Alphabetisch geordnet und mit Einleitung über das Studium der Pflanzenkunde in Tirol bis zum Jahre 1855 versehen; Vinzenz Gasser, in: "Studien und Mitteilungen zur Geschichte des Benediktinerordens und seiner Zweige".
