= C20orf144 =

Human protein-encoding gene

Identifiers
- Aliases: C20orf144, dJ63M2.6, chromosome 20 open reading frame 144
- External IDs: HomoloGene: 76810; GeneCards: C20orf144; OMA:C20orf144 - orthologs

Gene location (Human)
| Chr. | Chromosome 20 (human) |
| Band | 20q11.22 | Start | 33,662,327 bp |
| Band | 20q11.22 | End | 33,665,619 bp |
RNA expression pattern
| Bgee | Human / Mouse (ortholog); Top expressed in: right testis; left testis; testicle; sural nerve; stromal cell of endometrium; right adrenal cortex; left ovary; left adrenal gland; left adrenal cortex; right ovary / n/a; More reference expression data |
| BioGPS | n/a |
Orthologs
| Species | Human | Mouse |
| Entrez | 128864 | n/a |
| Ensembl | ENSG00000149609 | n/a |
| UniProt | Q9BQM9 | n/a |
| RefSeq (mRNA) | NM_080825 | n/a |
| RefSeq (protein) | NP_543015 | n/a |
| Location (UCSC) | Chr 20: 33.66 – 33.67 Mb | n/a |
| PubMed search | | n/a |
- Wikidata
| View/Edit Human |

Chromosome 20 open reading frame 144 (c20orf144) is a human protein-encoding gene. The human c20orf144 protein consists of 153 amino acids, with the first 150 amino acids being characterized as part of the Bcl-2 like protein of testis (Bclt) family (pfam 15318).

== Gene ==
The c20orf144 gene is located on the plus strand at 20q11.22 and spans 3,293 base pairs. The gene contains two exons. Of the plus strand, 572 nucleotides are antisense to parts of the human genes PXMP4 and NECAB3. Other gene neighbors include ACTL10 and CBFA2T2.

== Transcript ==
The encoded mRNA is 522 nucleotides in length (Accession: NM_080825) and there are no identified alternative splicings. Human c20orf144 mRNA expression is enriched in the testis, specifically in the early and late spermatids.

== Protein ==
The human c20orf144 gene encodes a protein of 153 amino acids in length, and there are three disordered regions (Accession: NP_543015.1). Amino acids 1-150 are a part of the Bclt protein family which is predicted to be involved in apoptosis. The molecular weight is 17.2kDa and the theoretical isoelectric point is 11.47. There are 21 more lysines and arginines, which are positively charged, than there are aspartates and glutamates, which are negatively charged.

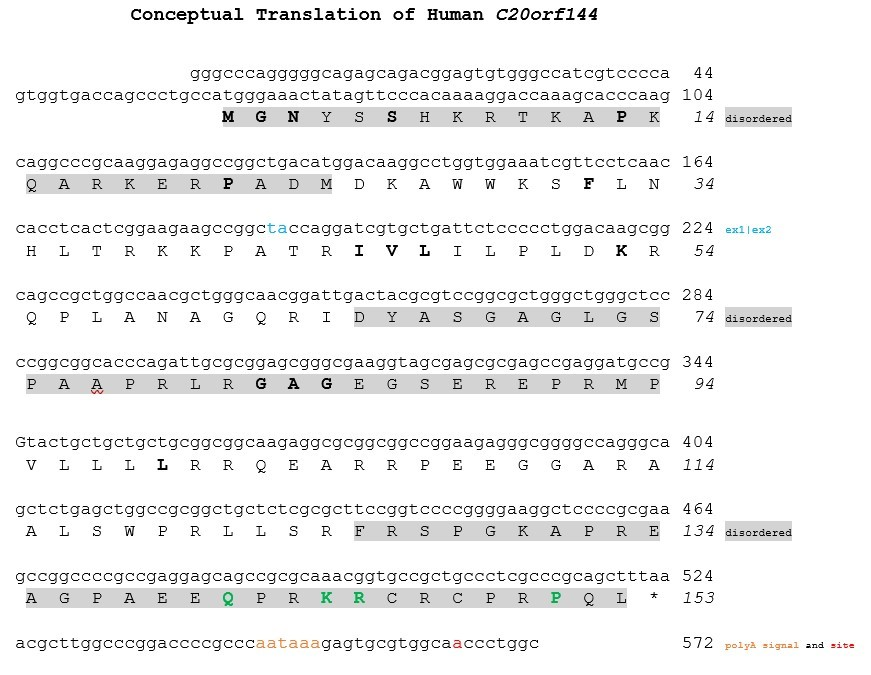
Annotated conceptual translation of human C20orf144 mRNA and protein.

The tertiary protein structure, produced by AlphaFold, predicts the presence of 3 α helices, and the absence of β sheets in human c20orf144.

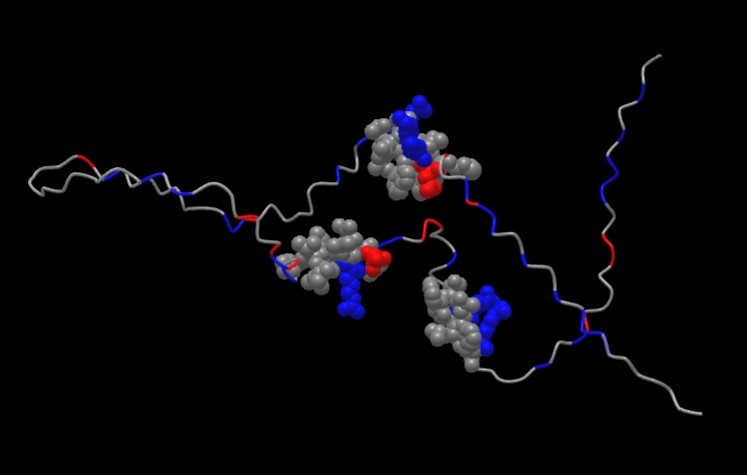
AlphaFold structure prediction of human C20orf144. The predicted alpha helices are shown in spherical form.

=== Cellular localization ===
Analysis of the localization of human c20orf144 and many mammalian orthologs predicts localization of c20orf144 in the nucleus, with 78.3% confidence for the human protein.

=== Post translational modifications ===
Table 1. Predicted Post Translation Modifications of Human C20orf144
| Modification | Modification Site in Human C20orf144 |
| N-Myristoylation | 2G |
| Protein Kinase C Phosphorylation | 6S |
| Casein Kinase 2 Phosphorylation | 87S |
| Non-Specific Phosphorylation | 117S |
| O-Glycosylation | 117S |
| Protein Kinase C Phosphorylation | 123S |

== Evolution and orthologs ==
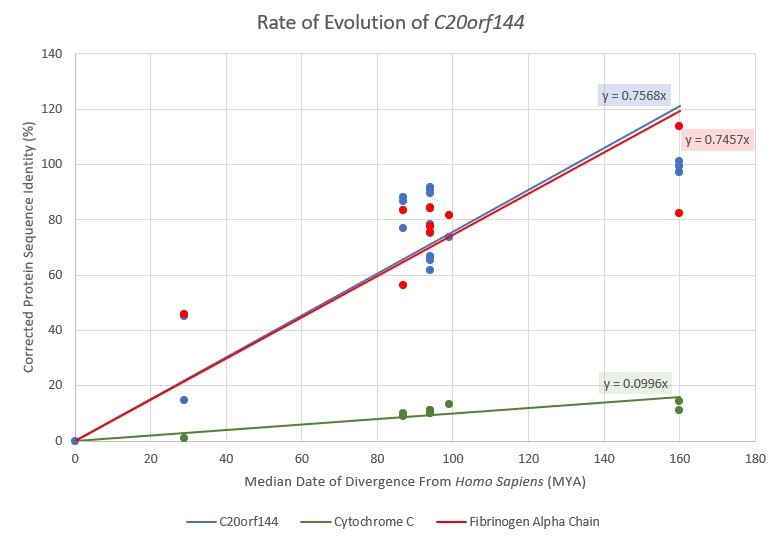
The rate of evolution of C20orf144 in comparison to the rates of evolution of Cytochrome C and Fibrinogen Alpha Chain.

The evolutionary rate of C20orf144 is comparable to the high rate of evolution of fibrinogen alpha chain, suggesting the protein is evolving quickly.

Orthologs of the c20orf144 gene in Homo sapiens are found in many mammals excluding monotremes. As shown in Table 2, marsupials are the most distantly related organisms to humans in which proteins encoded by human c20orf144 gene orthologs are found, suggesting that C20orf144 first appeared approximately 160 million years ago.

Table 2. Proteins encoded by the orthologs of the c20orf144 gene in humans.
| Genus and Species | Common Name | Order | Protein Accession # | Median Date of Divergence (MYA) | Sequence Length | Sequence Identity (%) | Sequence Similarity (%) |
| Homo sapiens | Human | Primata | NP_543015.1 | 0 | 153 | 100 | 100 |
| Macaca mulatta | Rhesus Monkey | Primata | XP_001105397.1 | 28.9 | 153 | 86.3 | 90.8 |
| Piliocolobus tephrosceles | Ugandan Red Colobus | Primata | XP_023076213.1 | 28.9 | 141 | 63.7 | 66.1 |
| Jaculus jaculus | Lesser Egyptian Jerboa | Rodentia | XP_045011648.1 | 87 | 176 | 46.4 | 55.8 |
| Myodes glareolus | Bank Vole | Rodentia | XP_048287479.1 | 87 | 197 | 42.1 | 51.8 |
| Mus musculus | House Mouse | Rodentia | NP_083581.1 | 87 | 197 | 41.4 | 49.8 |
| Camelus ferus | Wild Bactrian Camel | Artiodactyla | XP_032318023.1 | 94 | 174 | 54 | 64.4 |
| Equus caballus | Domestic Horse | Perissodactyla | XP_023482143.1 | 94 | 178 | 45.7 | 56 |
| Monodon monoceros | Narwhal | Artiodactyla | XP_029075207.1 | 94 | 181 | 42.9 | 50.5 |
| Physeter catodon | Sperm Whale | Artiodactyla | XP_023984368.1 | 94 | 148 | 40.8 | 48.4 |
| Prionailurus bengalensis | Leopard Cat | Carnivora | XP_043458511.1 | 94 | 179 | 52 | 60.9 |
| Ursus arctos | Brown Bear | Carnivora | XP_026358671.1 | 94 | 184 | 51.6 | 61.4 |
| Eumetopias jubatus | Steller Sea Lion | Carnivora | XP_027974622.1 | 94 | 184 | 47.3 | 58.1 |
| Rousettus aegyptiacus | Egyptian Fruit Bat | Chiroptera | XP_016017694.2 | 94 | 175 | 51.4 | 62.7 |
| Rhinolophus ferrumenquinum | Greater Horseshoe Bat | Chiroptera | XP_032951343.1 | 94 | 191 | 40.2 | 51.5 |
| Pteropus vampyrus | Large Flying Fox | Chiroptera | XP_023377960.1 | 94 | 209 | 40 | 50.5 |
| Choloepus didactylus | Southern Two-Toed Sloth | Pilosa | XP_037668100.1 | 99 | 188 | 47.9 | 57.4 |
| Gracilinanus agilis | Agile Gracile Mouse Opossum | Didelphimorphia | XP_044517537.1 | 160 | 169 | 37.9 | 49.7 |
| Dromiciops gliroides | Monito del Monte | Microbiotheria | XP_043845608.1 | 160 | 170 | 37 | 50.8 |
| Sarcophilus harrisii | Tasmanian Devil | Dasyuromorphia | XP_031809718.1 | 160 | 160 | 36.4 | 50 |

== Clinical significance ==
In a study of 28 breast cancer patients, missense mutations in c20orf144 were found in approximately 33% of patients, suggesting a potential role for c20orf144 in the development of breast cancer. Furthermore, c20orf144 is listed in primary renal proximal tubule epithelial cells as a top candidate hit in an siRNA screen, which silences targeted genes. The silencing of c20orf144 in cells exposed to Shiga toxin resulted in metabolic activity that was greater than or equal to 90% of that in a typical cell.
