= Clenia (mammal) =

Clenia Temporal range: Oligocene - Early Miocene

Scientific classification
- Kingdom: Animalia
- Phylum: Chordata
- Class: Mammalia
- Infraclass: Marsupialia
- Order: Microbiotheria
- Family: Microbiotheriidae
- Genus: †Clenia; Ameghino, 1904

Type species
- †Clenia minuscula Ameghino, 1904

Species
- C. brevis; C. minuscula

Synonyms
- Clenialites

Extinct genus of marsupial

Clenia is an extinct genus of marsupials from the Oligocene and Miocene of South America. They are relatives of the living monito del monte (colocolo).

== Description ==
Two species are known. The type species is Clenia minuscula from the Early Miocene of Argentina. The other is Clenia brevis from the Oligocene of Argentina. It had more robust molars than C. minuscula.
