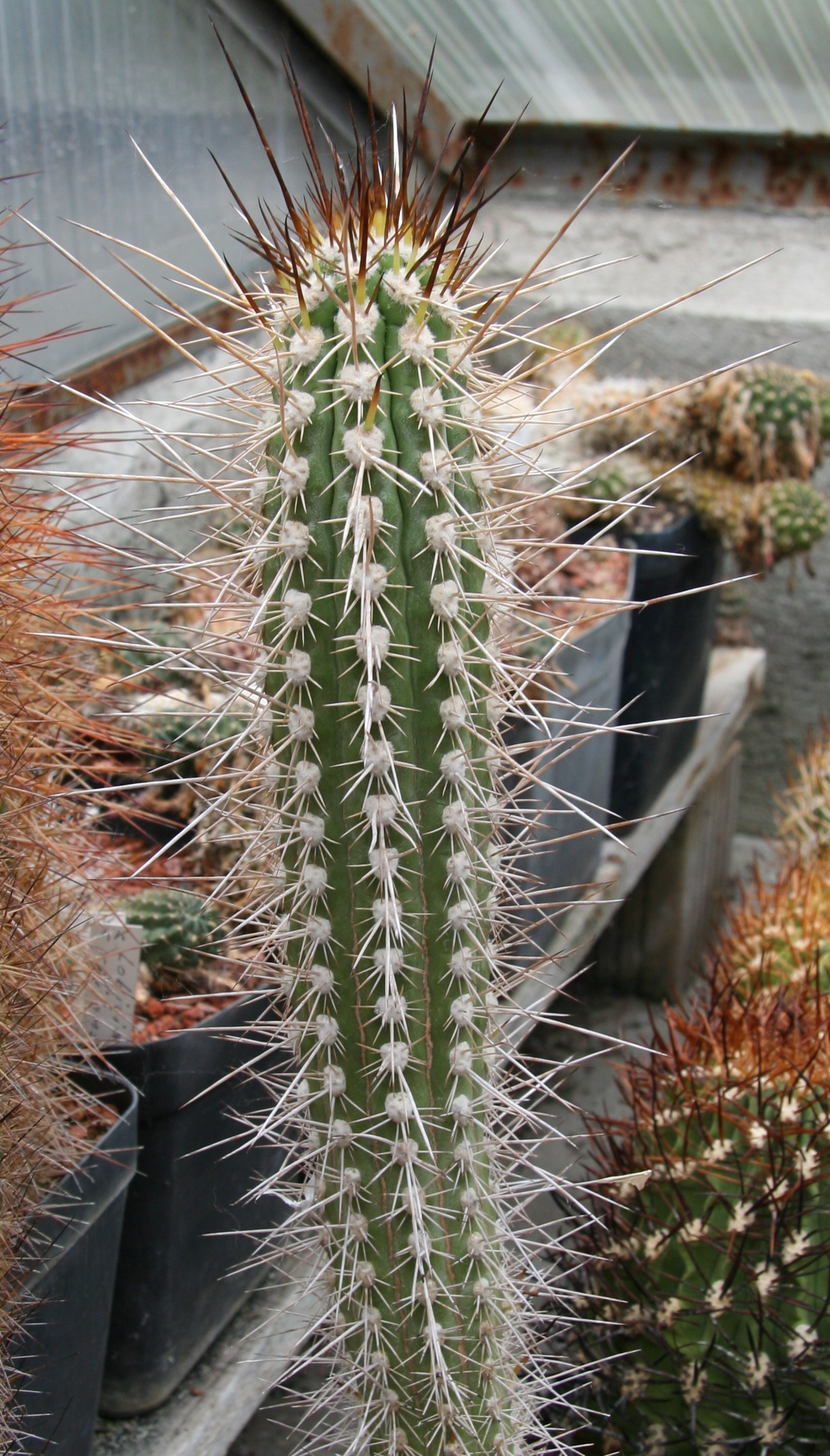

Conservation status
- Least Concern (IUCN 3.1)

Scientific classification
- Kingdom: Plantae
- Clade: Tracheophytes
- Clade: Angiosperms
- Clade: Eudicots
- Order: Caryophyllales
- Family: Cactaceae
- Subfamily: Cactoideae
- Genus: Eulychnia
- Species: E. acida

Binomial name
- Eulychnia acida Phil. 1864

Synonyms
- Cereus acidus (Phil.) K.Schum. 1903; Philippicereus acidus (Phil.) Guiggi 2020

= Eulychnia acida =

Species of cactus

Eulychnia acida is a flowering plant in the family Cactaceae that is found in Chile.

== Description ==
Eulychnia acida is a arborescent columnar cactus typically exhibits a tree-like form, reaching between 1.5 and 4 meters in height, though it can grow up to 7 meters in favorable conditions. It usually develops a distinct trunk about one meter long, from which it branches to form a rounded crown. Alternatively, some individuals lack a clear trunk and present a low, highly branched, and often prostrate or ascending form, rarely exceeding one meter in height. The cactus's development is often irregular and asymmetrical, a result of its struggle for moisture, leading to a disordered appearance. Its stems, which can be erect or almost prostrate and range from 6 to 12 cm (2.4 to 4.7 in) in diameter, are intensely spiny even from the seedling stage. The greenish-gray epidermis is often coated with accumulated dirt and dust. It is common to observe dead or dying parts alongside inactive living tissue, making it difficult to discern active from dormant areas.

The stems feature 10 to 16 broad, low ribs, with areoles spaced 7 to 15 mm (0.28 to 0.59 in) apart along these ribs. The spination is highly variable, characterized by almost straight, erect, needle-shaped spines that are dark brown when young, aging to gray. Each areole typically bears one to two central spines, erect and exceptionally long, measuring between 10 and 20 cm (7.9 in), along with about 12 radial spines, oriented outwards and approximately 1 cm (0.39 in) in length.

Flowers emerge near the stem tips and are broadly bell-shaped, measuring 5 to 7 cm (2.0 to 2.8 in) in length and 4 to 6 cm (1.6 to 2.4 in) in diameter at the opening. They are white, sometimes with a pale pink central stripe. The ovary and floral tube are covered with small, ovate, imbricate scales that are fleshy at the base and tipped with acute, calloused, black points, adorned with very short tufts of dark blue to blackish-gray hairs. The inner perianth segments, 2 to 2.2 cm (0.79 to 0.87 in) long, are initially pale pink, later turning white with a pink stripe. The throat is very short and densely packed with included stamens, 1 to 1.5 cm (0.39 to 0.59 in) long, arranged within the wide, white throat. The style is short, robust, about 2 cm (0.79 in) long, rigid, and white, bearing 12 to 15 stigmatic lobes.

The fruit is globose, 5 to 6 cm (2.0 to 2.4 in) long and about 5 cm (2.0 in) in diameter. It is scaly, hairy, and spineless, with a fleshy, somewhat acidic pulp. The fruit is greenish-gray when immature, ripening to a brownish-yellowish green, and is crowned by the persistent floral remnants. Edible and appearing nearly bare, without wool or spines, the fruit contains dull black seeds approximately 1.5 mm (0.059 in) in length. The seeds are dispersed by Mimus thenca.

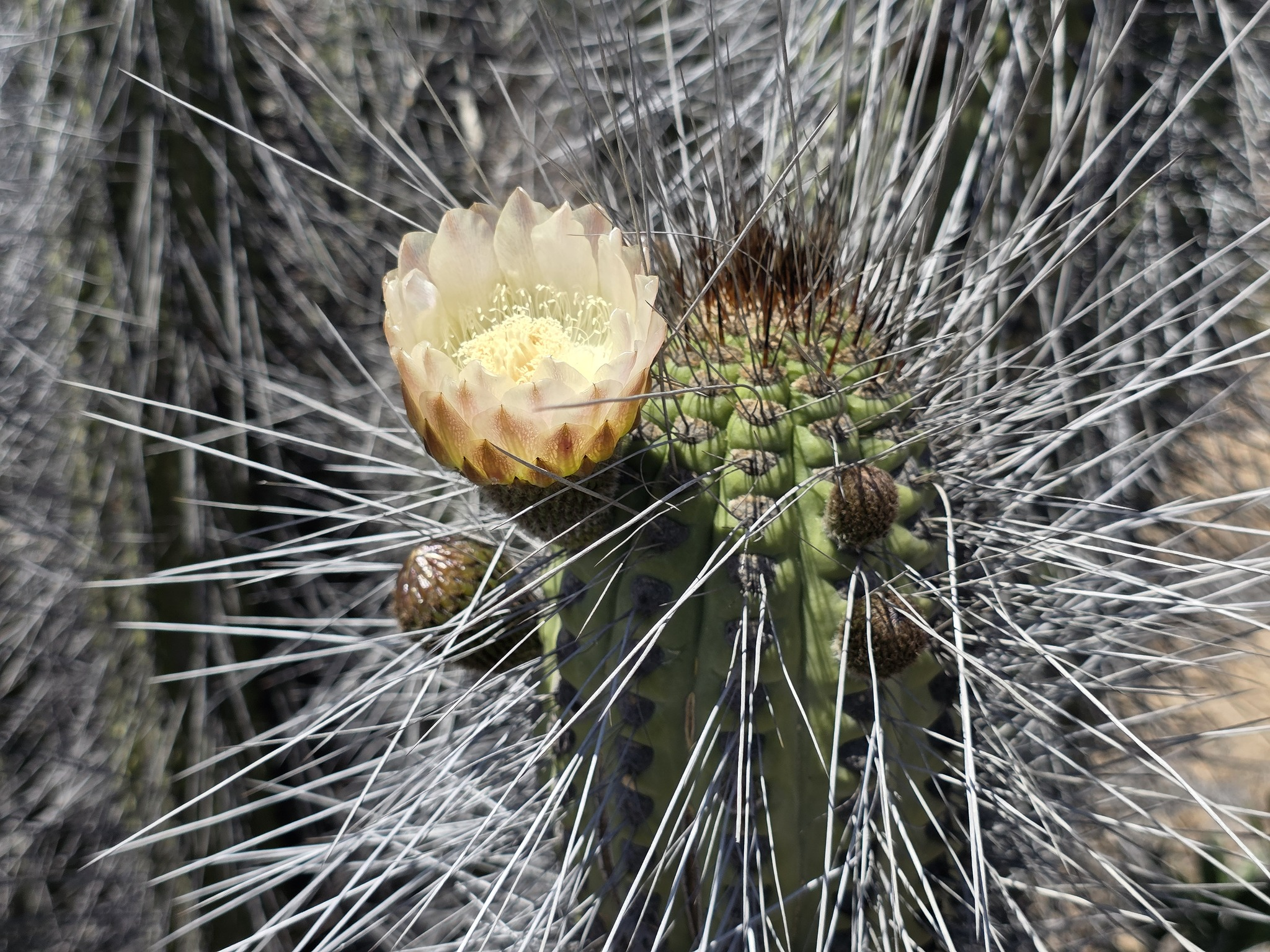
Flower

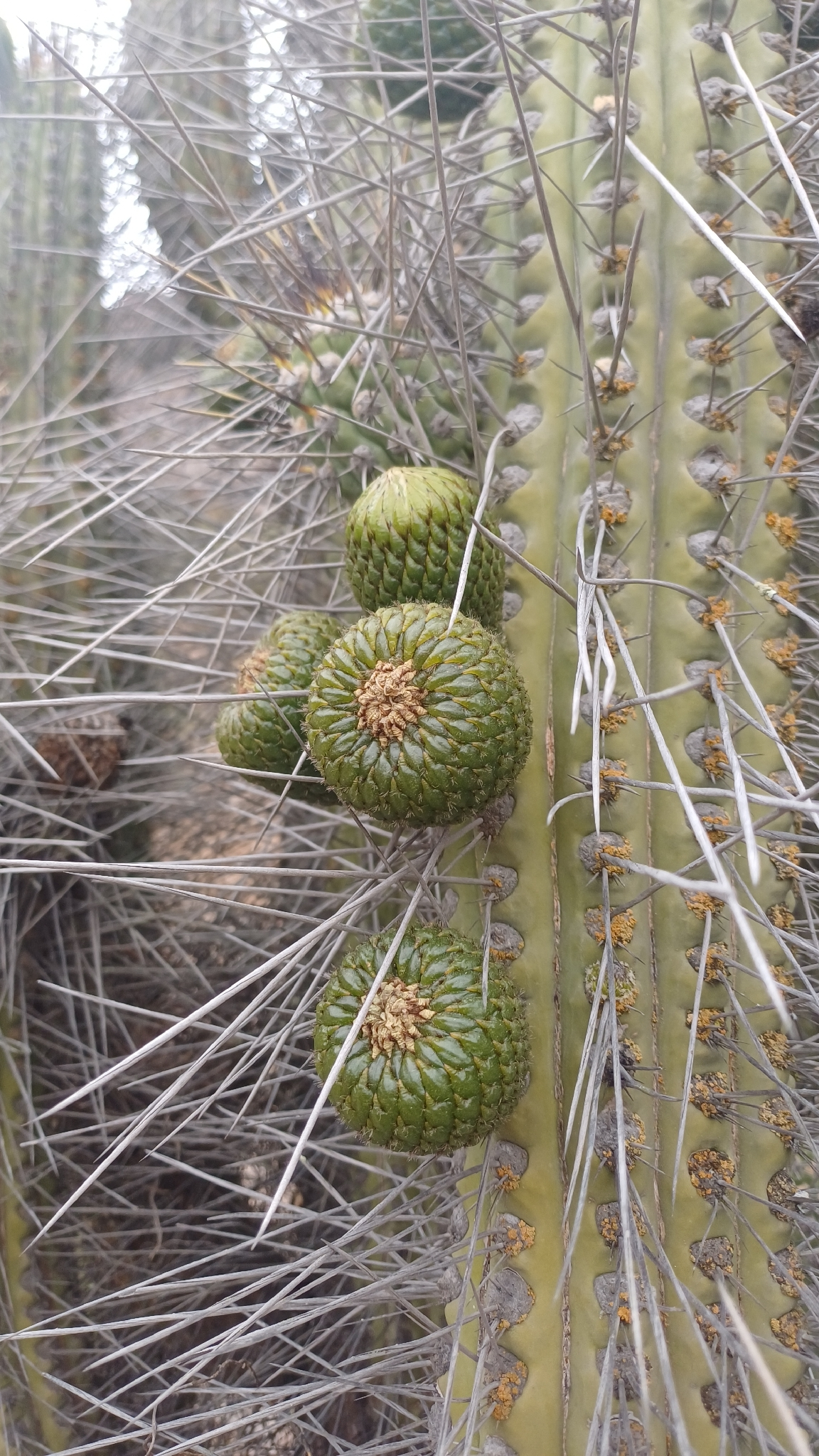
Fruit

== Distribution ==
Eulychnia acida's native range spans northern and central Chile, from north of Vallenar to south of Illapel found in desert and dry scrub biomes from sea level up to approximately 1300 meters in altitude. It thrives in coastal valleys and mountain slopes, often alongside other cacti like Leucostele chiloensis, and shows a preference for rocky, fog-exposed areas where condensation provides moisture to its root system. While it can be found on gentler slopes and plains with minimal water, its presence in these habitats, with rainfall rarely exceeding 50 mm annually, highlights its remarkable adaptation to extreme aridity. This species is a significant component of its native scrubland ecosystems, exhibiting considerable morphological variation influenced by both genetic factors and local environmental conditions. Capable of reaching great longevity, with some individuals surviving for centuries, Eulychnia acida plays a vital ecological role in the Huasco and Aconcagua valleys. It also engages in a highly specialized interaction, being exclusively parasitized by the hemiparasitic plant Tristerix aphyllus.

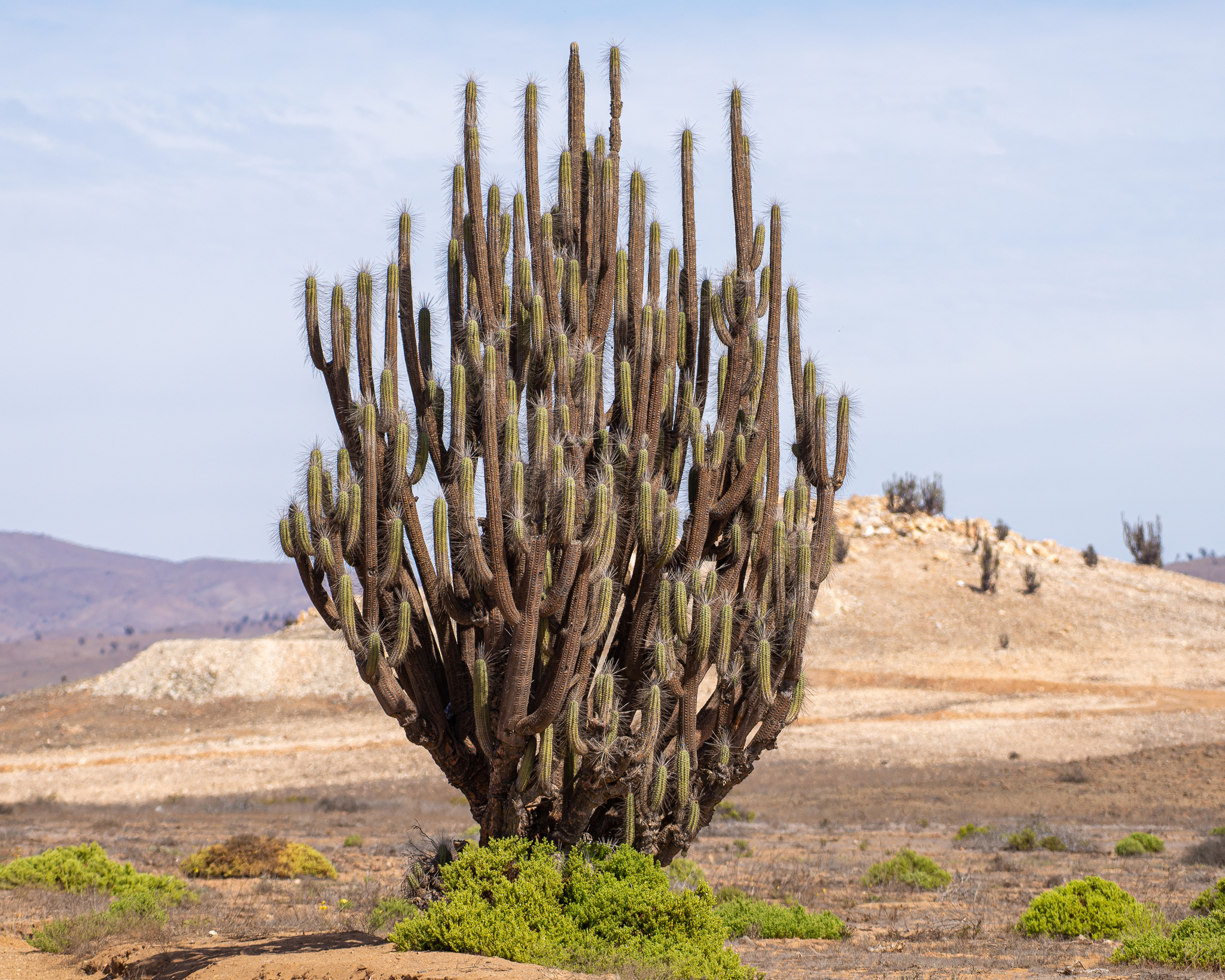
Habitat in Carrizal Alto, Huasco, Chile

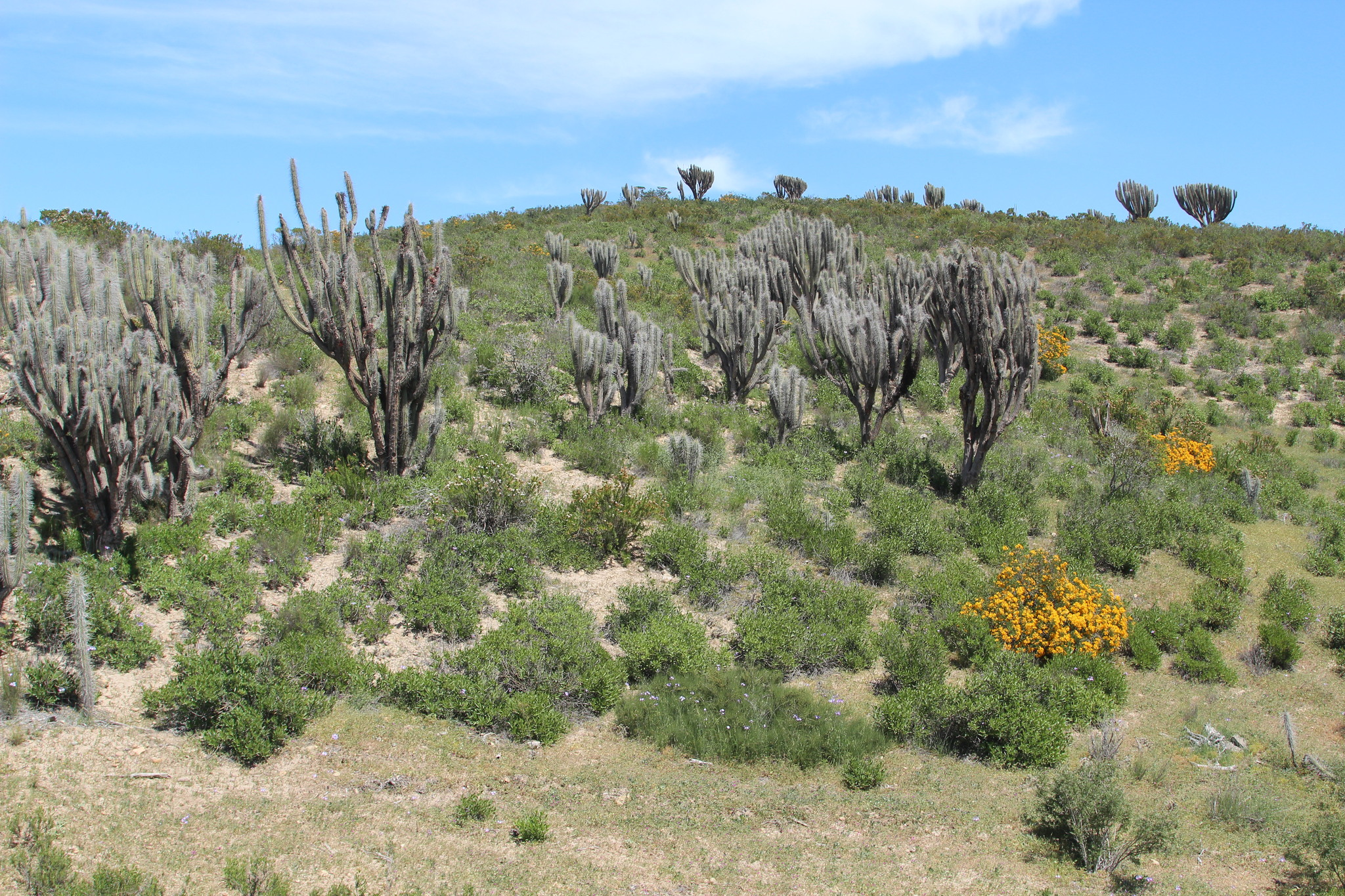
Habitat in Totoralillo, Coquimbo, Chile

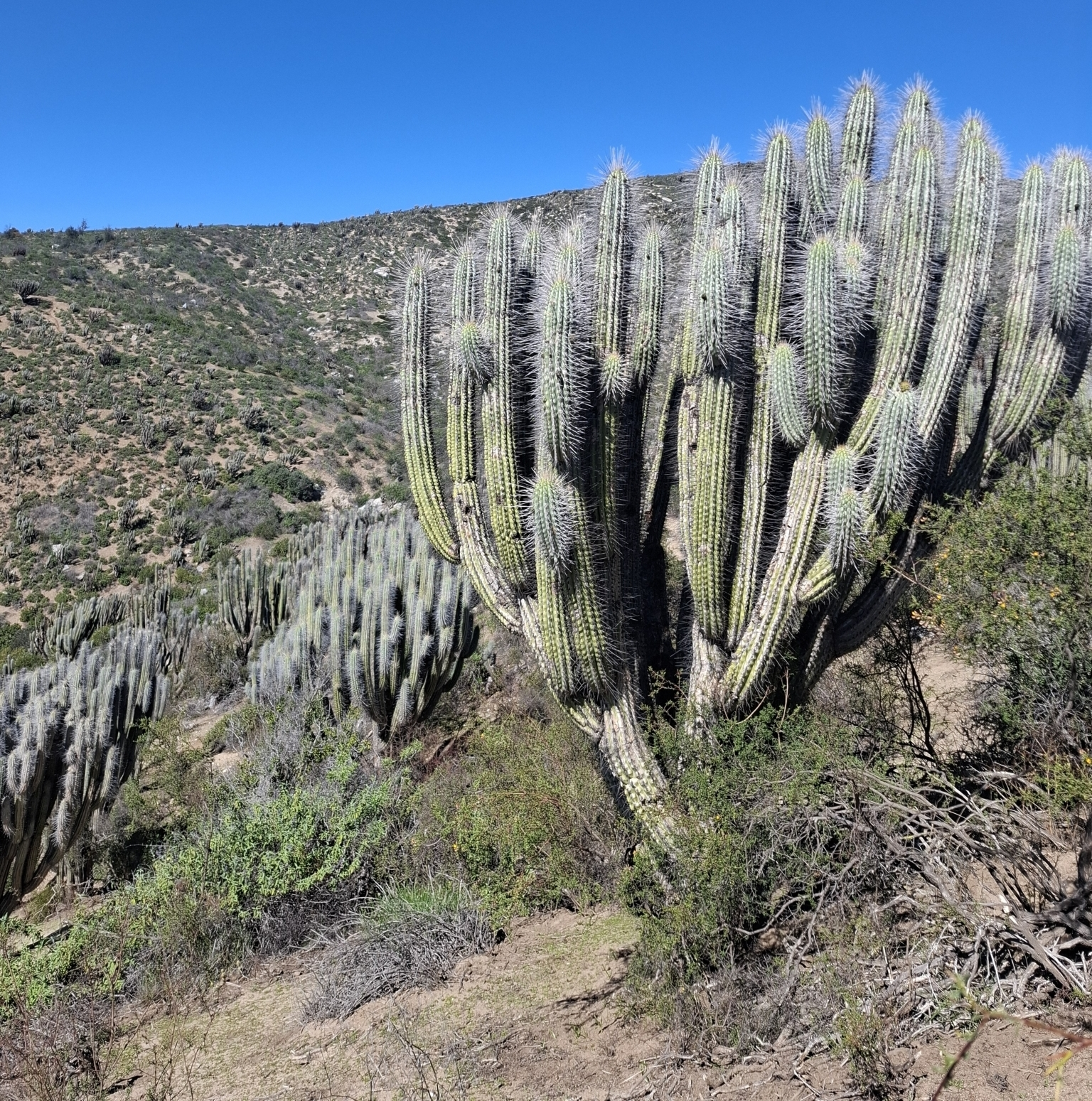
Plant in Caimanes, Los Vilos, Chile

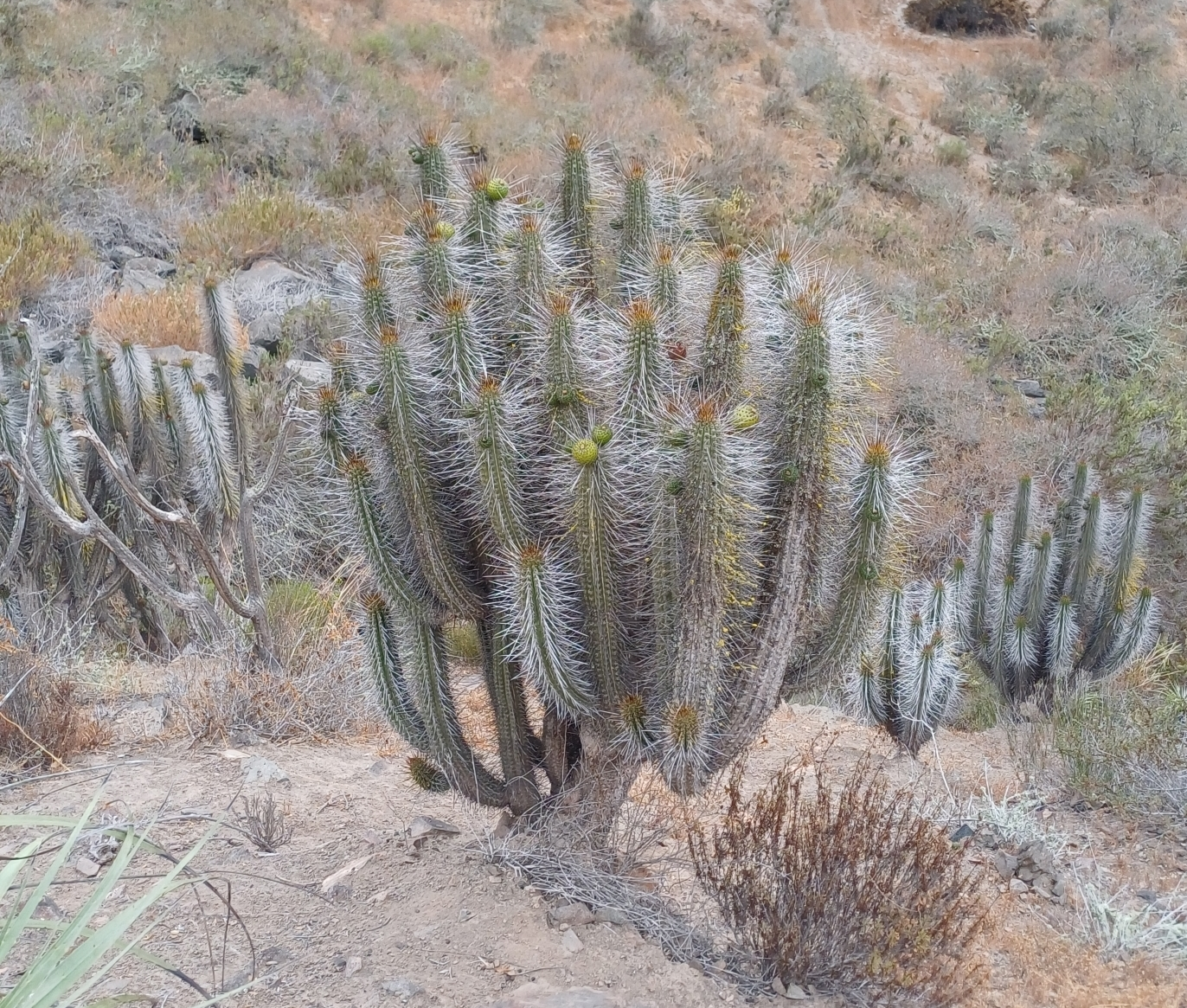
Plant fruiting in La Serena, Chile

== Taxonomy ==
First described by Rodulfo Amando Philippi in 1864, the species name "acida" derives from the Latin word for 'sour' or 'acidic,' referring to the taste of its fruit.
