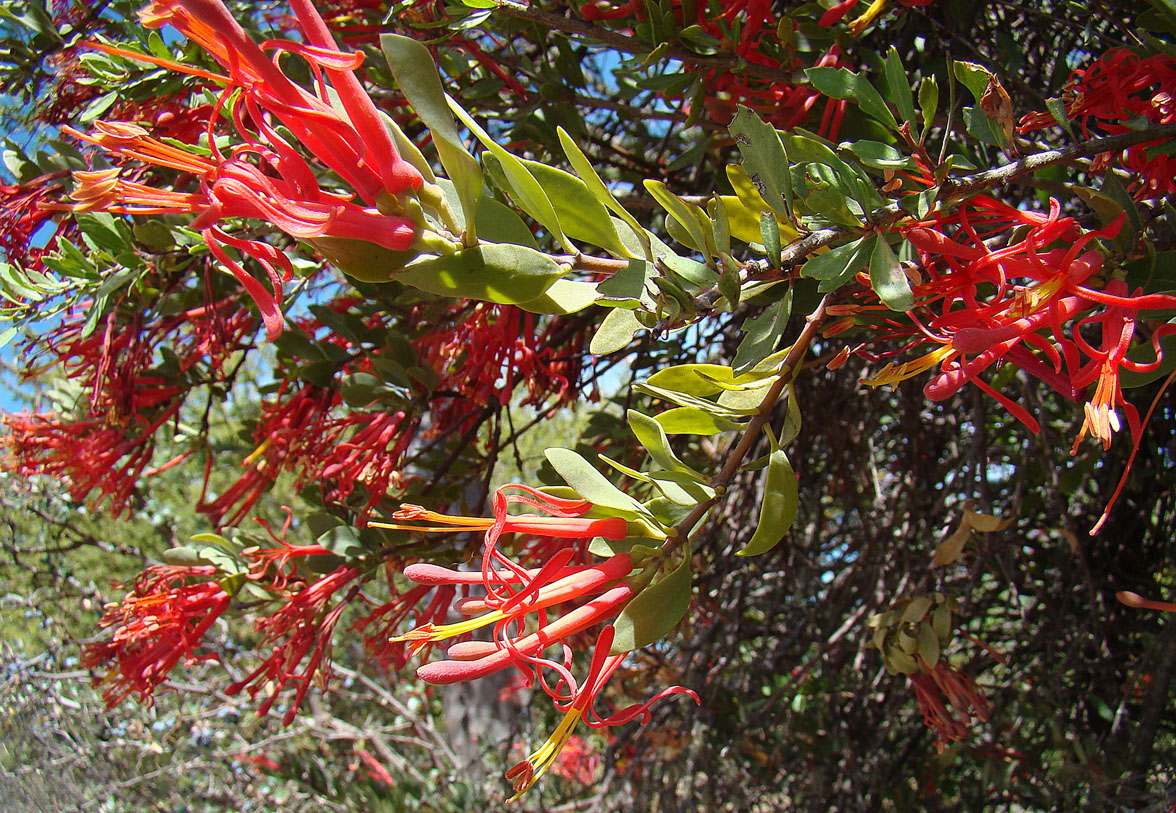

Scientific classification
- Kingdom: Plantae
- Clade: Tracheophytes
- Clade: Angiosperms
- Clade: Eudicots
- Order: Santalales
- Family: Loranthaceae
- Genus: Tristerix
- Species: T. verticillatus

Binomial name
- Tristerix verticillatus (Ruiz & Pav.) Barlow & Wiens 1971

Synonyms
- Loranthus verticillatus Ruiz & Pav.; Notanthera verticillatus (Ruiz & Pav.) G.Don; Phrygilanthus verticillatus (Ruiz & Pav.) Eichler; Loranthus poeppigii DC.; Loranthus sternbergianus Schult. & Schult.f.; Loxanthera sternbergianus Blume; Metastachys verticillata Tiegh.; Notanthera poeppigii G.Don; Notanthera sternbergianus G.Don; Phrygilanthus sternbergianus (Schult. & Schult.f.) Reiche; Phrygilanthus verticillatus var. flava-citrinus Ruíz Leal; Psittacanthus sternbergianus (Schult. & Schult.f.) Blume

= Tristerix verticillatus =

Species of mistletoe

Tristerix verticillatus is a species of flowering plant in the family Loranthaceae. It is found in Argentina, Bolivia, and Chile.
