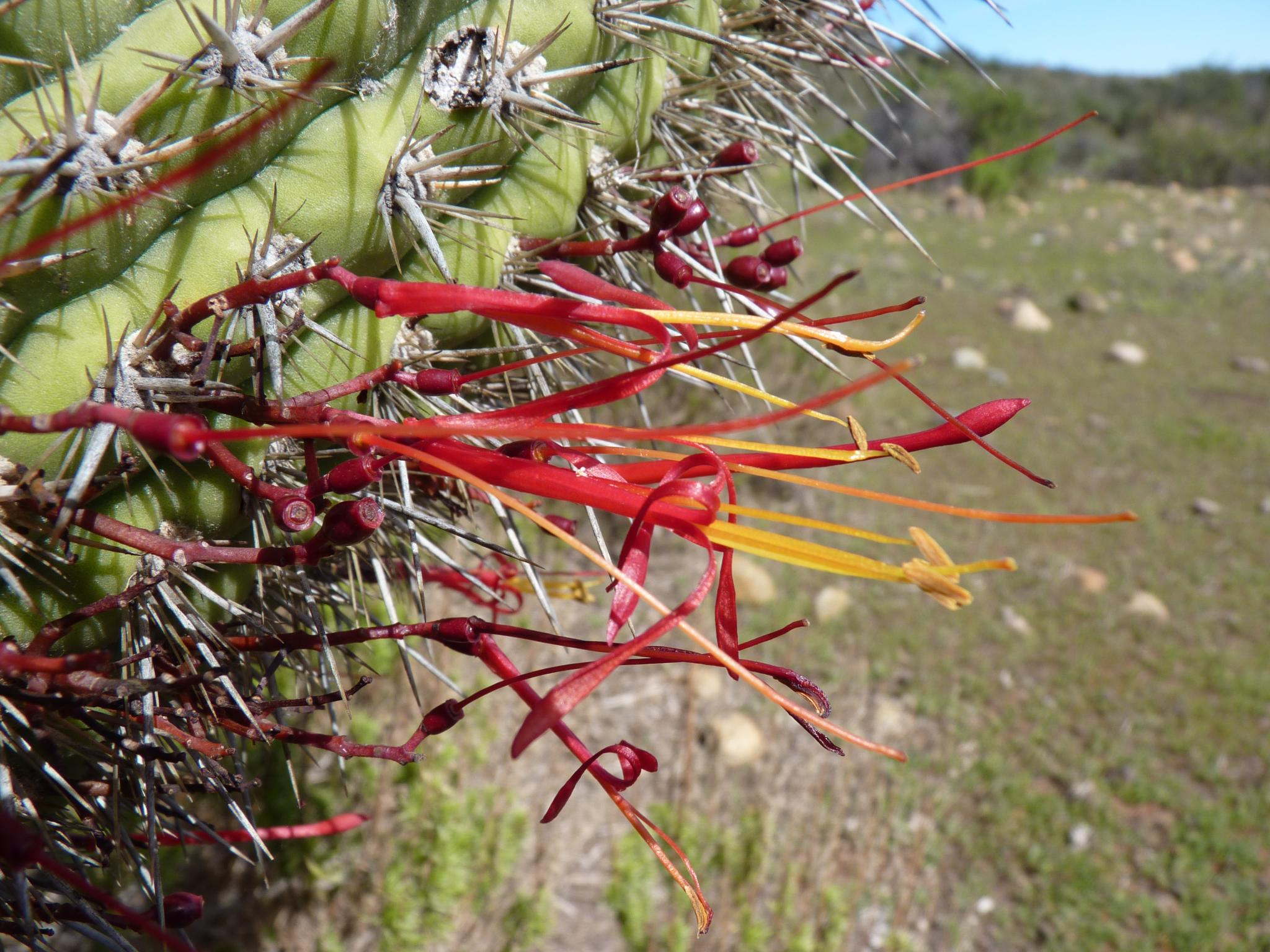
- Tristerix aphyllus

Scientific classification
- Kingdom: Plantae
- Clade: Tracheophytes
- Clade: Angiosperms
- Clade: Eudicots
- Order: Santalales
- Family: Loranthaceae
- Genus: Tristerix
- Species: T. aphyllus

Binomial name
- Tristerix aphyllus (Miers ex DC.) Tiegh. ex Barlow & Wiens

= Tristerix aphyllus =

Species of mistletoe

Tristerix aphyllus is a holoparasitic plant species of the genus Tristerix in the family Loranthaceae. It is endemic to Chile. T. aphyllus is sometimes called the "cactus mistletoe." It should not be confused with the mistletoe cactus, which is an epiphytic cactus, and not a mistletoe.

== Description ==
Tristerix aphyllus parasitizes two species of cactus; Echinopsis chiloensis and Eulychnia acida, and in its adult form shows only its flowers and its fruits, bursting forth spectacularly from the columnar cacti which are its hosts. Mauseth (2011) discusses the morphological/anatomical effects of T. aphyllus on the cactus Echinopsis chiloensis.

=== Taxonomy ===
T. aphyllus was first described by John Miers in 1830 as Loranthus aphyllus but with the publication in 1973 of an article by Barlow & Wiens, became Tristerix aphyllus (authors, Tieghem (Tiegh.)).

Other synonyms are:

- Loranthus cactorum Hook. & Arn. Bot. Beechey Voy. 25. 1830 [Dec 1830]
- Loranthus pumilus Miers ex Schult. & Schult.f. Syst. Veg., ed. 15 bis [Roemer & Schultes] 7(2): 1649. 1830 [Oct-Dec 1830]
- Phrygilanthus aphyllus (Miers ex DC.) Eichler Fl. Bras. (Martius) 5(2): 47. 1868 [15 Jul 1868]

(sourcesː Govaerts et.al., International Plant Names Index, 2018)

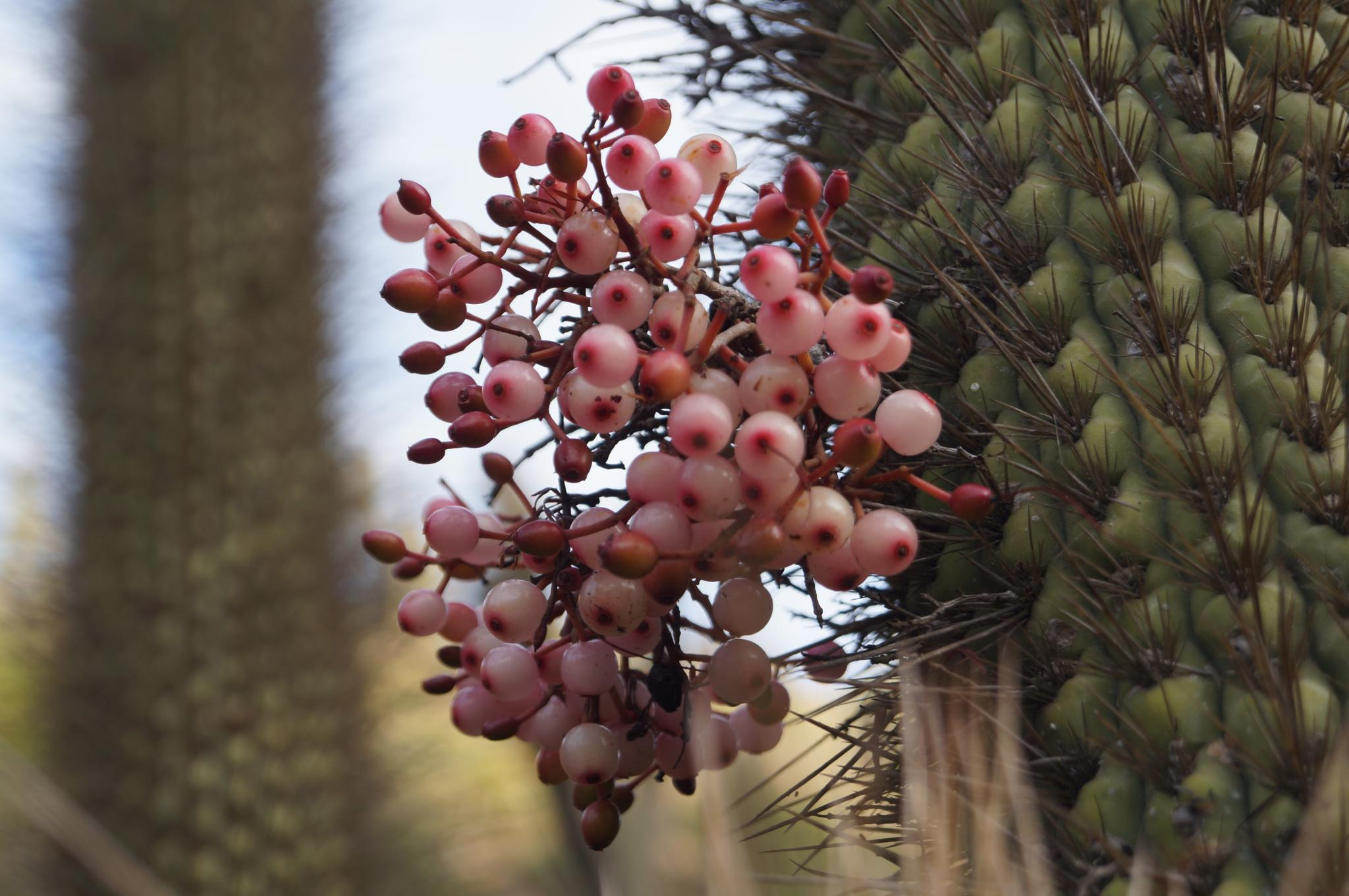
Tristerix aphyllus: fruit
