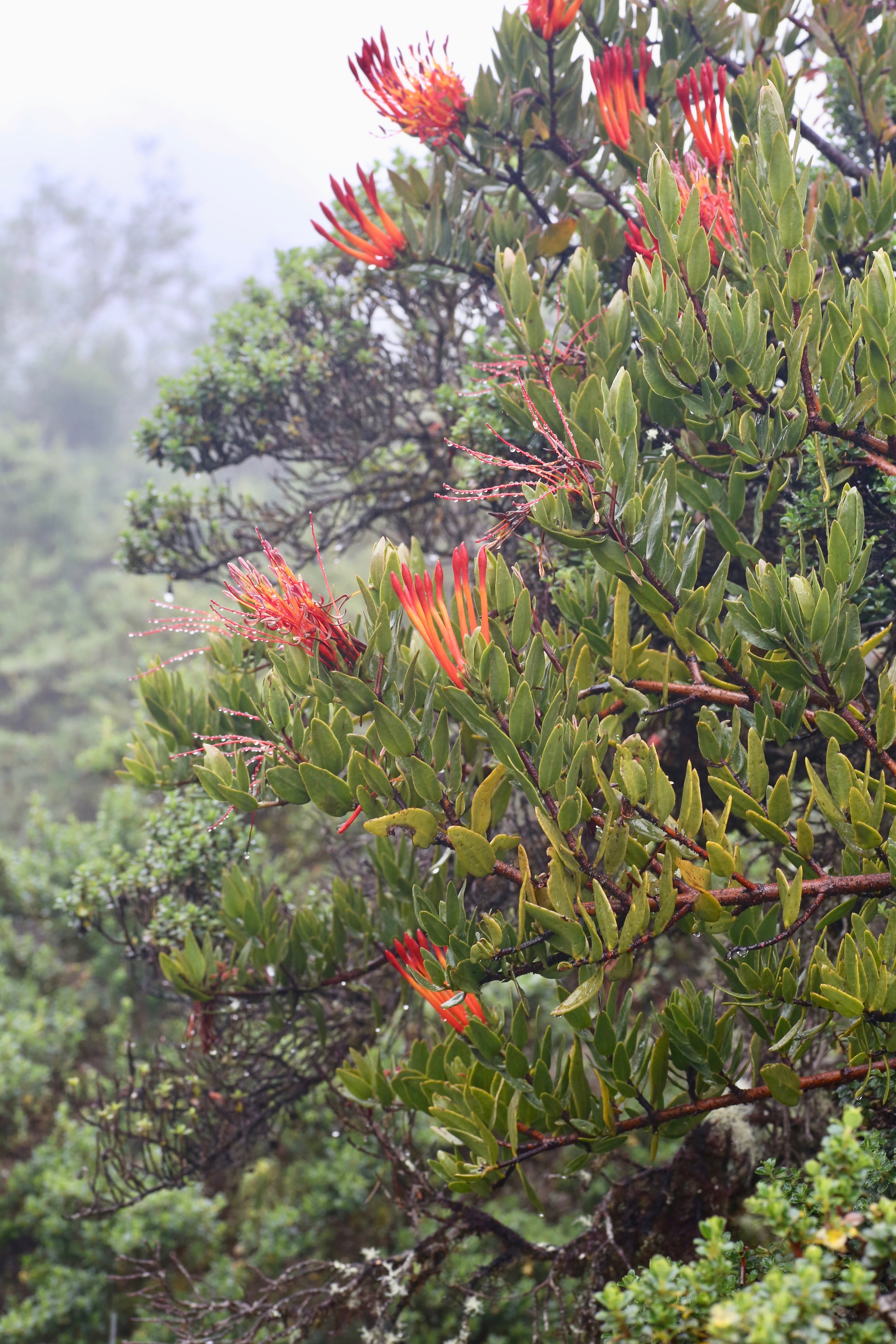

Scientific classification
- Kingdom: Plantae
- Clade: Tracheophytes
- Clade: Angiosperms
- Clade: Eudicots
- Order: Santalales
- Family: Loranthaceae
- Genus: Tristerix
- Species: T. longebracteatus

Binomial name
- Tristerix longebracteatus (Desr.) Barlow & Wiens

= Tristerix longebracteatus =

Species of mistletoe

Tristerix longebracteatus is a species of Tristerix found in Colombia and Ecuador
