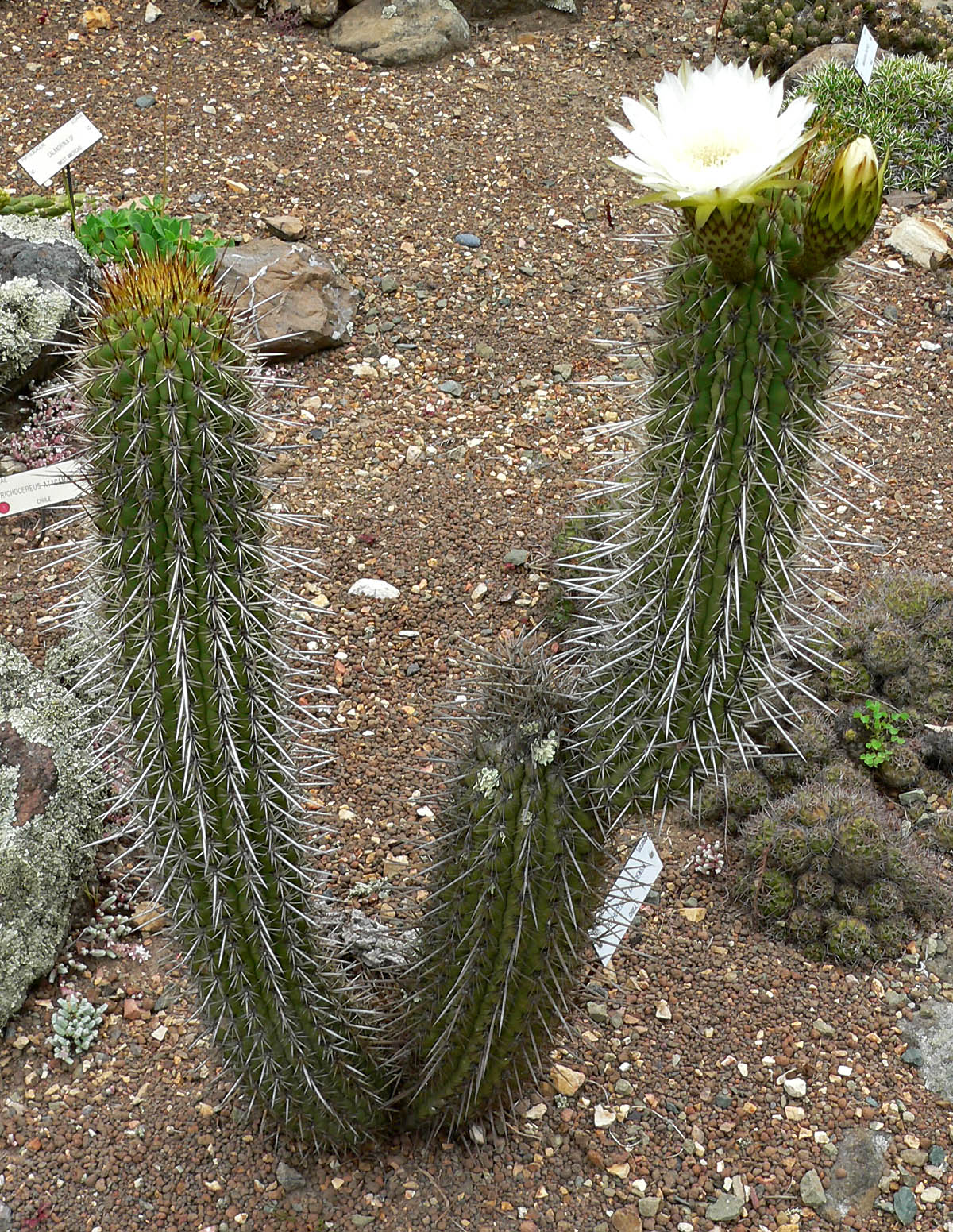

Conservation status
- Least Concern (IUCN 3.1)

Scientific classification
- Kingdom: Plantae
- Clade: Tracheophytes
- Clade: Angiosperms
- Clade: Eudicots
- Order: Caryophyllales
- Family: Cactaceae
- Subfamily: Cactoideae
- Genus: Leucostele
- Species: L. chiloensis

Binomial name
- Leucostele chiloensis (Colla) Schlumpb.

Synonyms
- List: Cactus chiloensis Colla ex Steud.; Cereus chiloensis DC.; Trichocereus chiloensis (Colla) Britton & Rose; Cactus chilensis Colla; Cereus coquimbanus DC.; Cereus fulvibarbis Otto & A.Dietr.; Cereus panoplaeatus Cels ex Salm-Dyck; Cereus pycnacanthus Salm-Dyck; Cereus quintero Pfeiff.; Cereus zizkaanus (K.Schum.) Schelle; Echinocereus chiloensis (Colla) Console & Lem.; Echinopsis chiloensis var. eburnea (Phil.) Friedrich & G.D.Rowley; Eulychnia eburnea Phil. ex K.Schum.

= Leucostele chiloensis =

Species of plant

Leucostele chiloensis is a species of cactus native to South America; genus members are known as hedgehog cacti, sea-urchin cactus or Easter lily cactus.

== Description ==
This species, L chiloensis, is tree-like with branching structures, straight, vigorous and 1 to 6 meters long. The shoots are cylindrical, 10 to 25 cm in diameter, and have 11 to 17 mostly low and wide ribs, usually low and wide. The glochids have bright yellow spines that later turn gray. The central spine is straight and is 4-7 (rarely up to 20) cm long. The radial spines of lateral emission are 8 to 12, and measure 1 to 2 cm or more. The funnel-shaped flowers are white and open during the day. They are up to 14 cm long. The fruits are spherical, green 2 to 4 cm in length and 3 to 5 cm in diameter and edible. The fruit is covered with subulate scales and abundant brown and gray hairs An example occurrence is within the La Campana National Park in Chile.

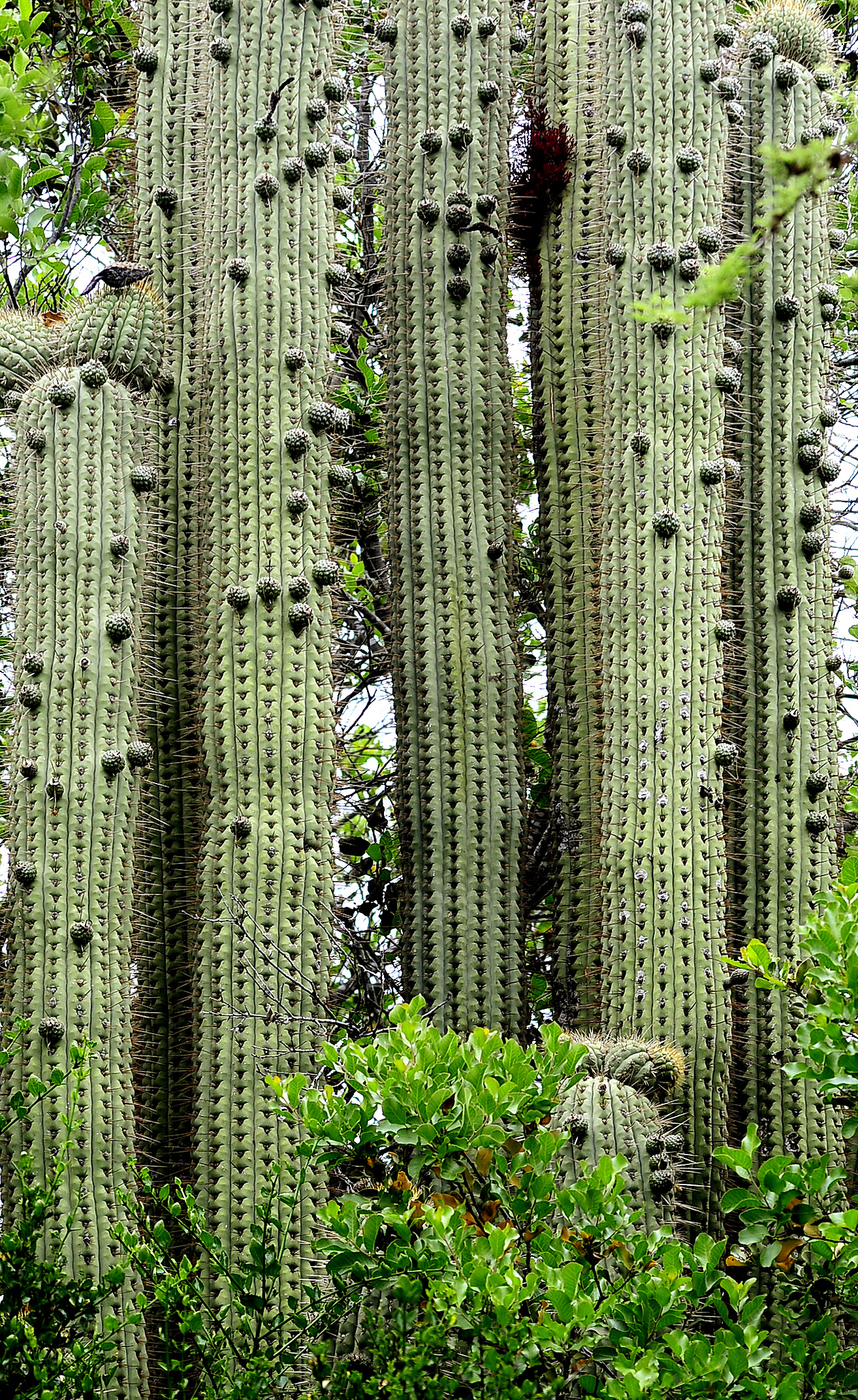

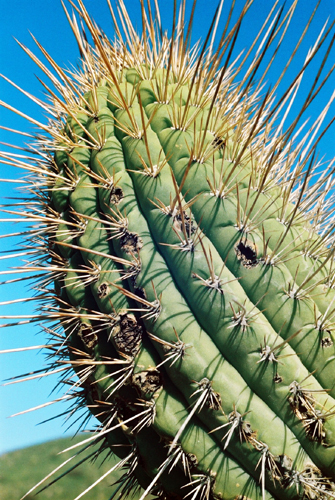
Spines

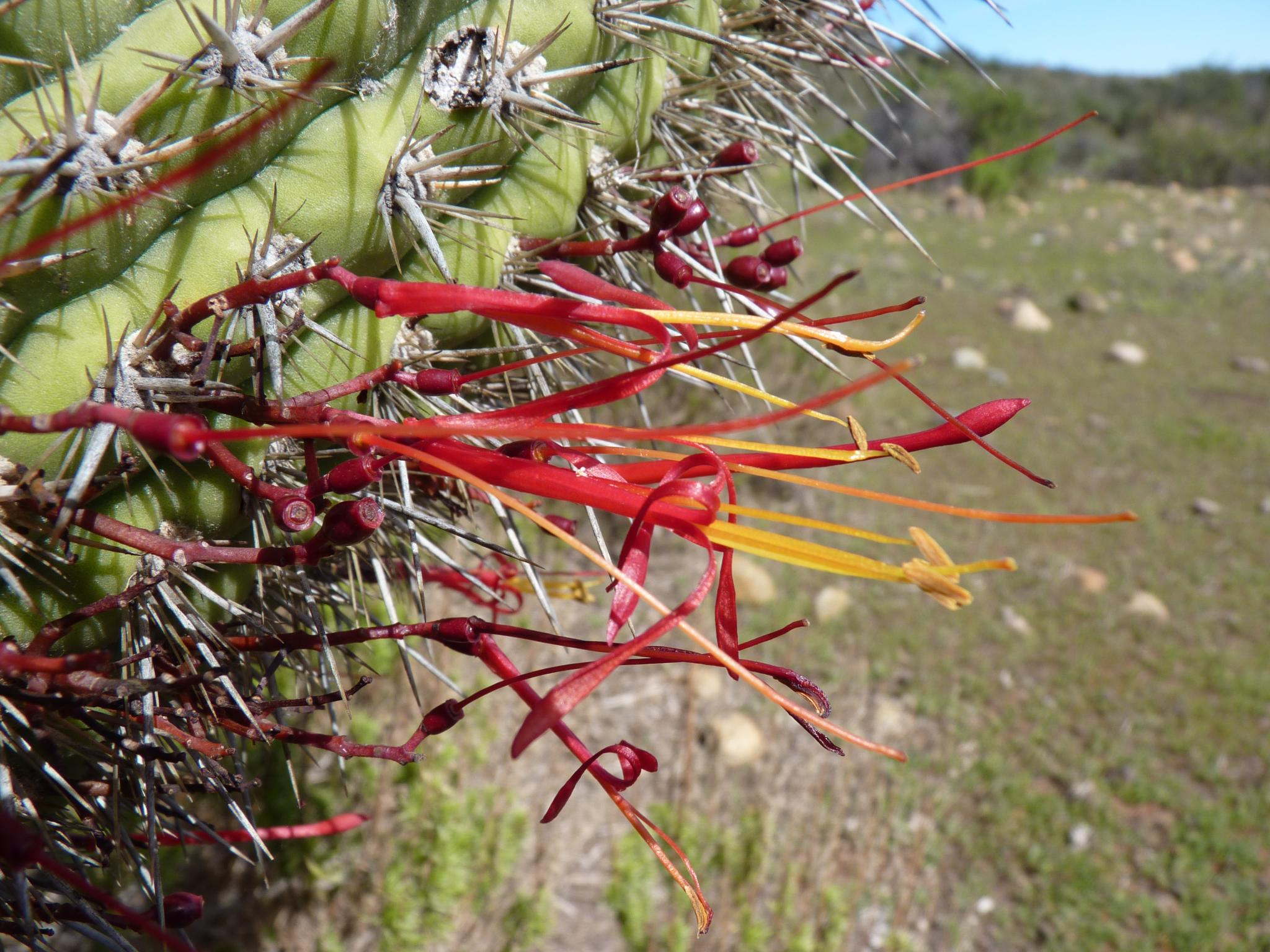
Tristerix aphyllus parasitizing an Leucostele chiloensis

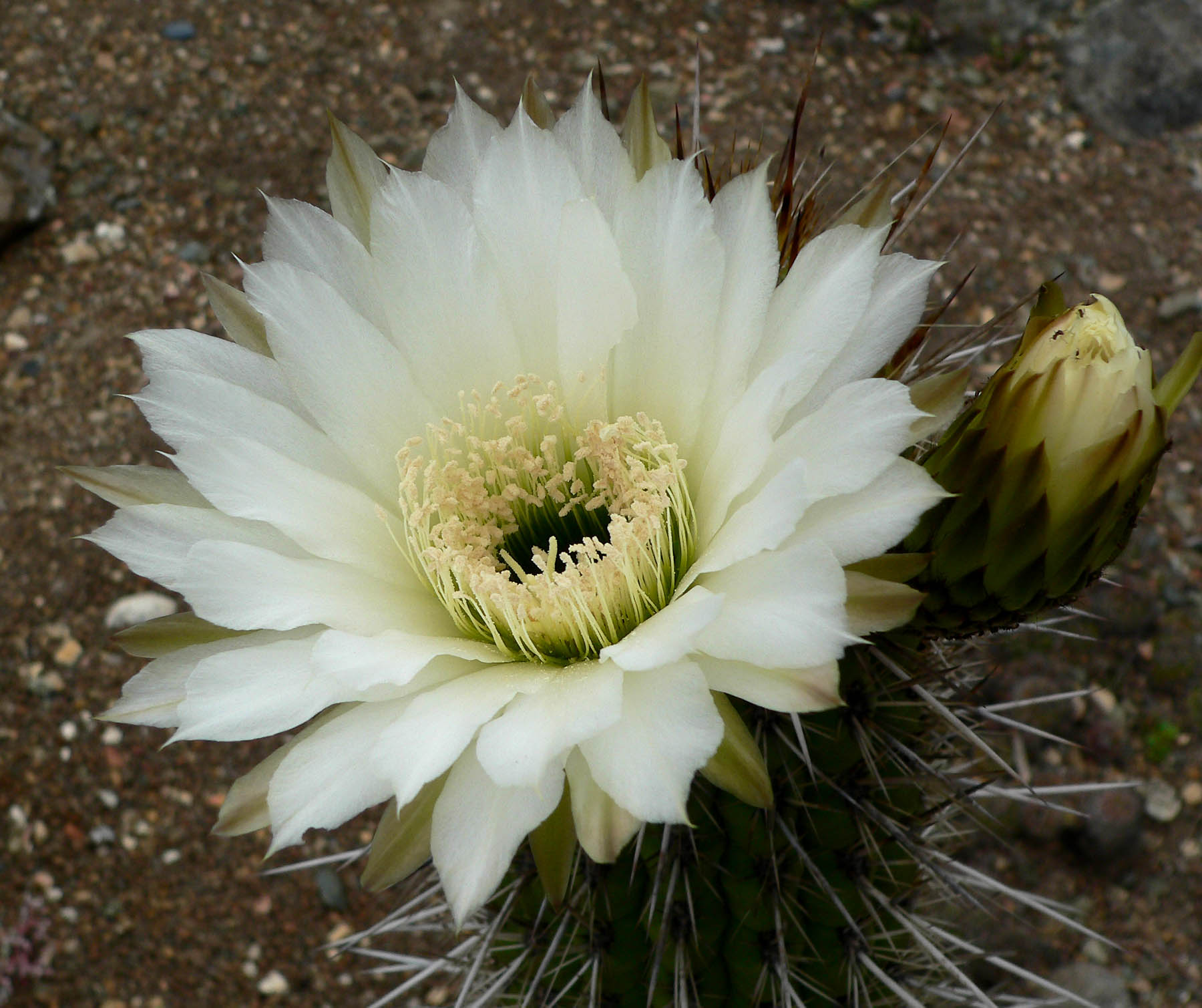
Flower

== Subspecies ==
There are five recognized subspecies:

Image	Subspecies	Description	Distribution
	Leucostele chiloensis subsp. australis (F.Ritter) Schlumpb., 2021	Tall-growing plants exceeding 2 m in height. The stems reach a diameter of between 13 and 25 cm. They feature gray spines with brown tips on the subapical areoles. Between 7 and 10 radial spines can be distinguished on the mature areoles.	Central Chile
	Leucostele chiloensis subsp. borealis (F.Ritter) Lodé, 2024	Tall plants exceeding 2 m in height. They bear very long spines, up to 25 cm in length.	Chile (Coquimbo)
	Leucostele chiloensis subsp. chiloensis	Tall plants exceeding 2 m in height. The stems reach a diameter of between 9 and 10 cm.	North and Central Chile
	Leucostele chiloensis subsp. eburneus (K.Schum.) Schlumpb., 2021	Tall plants exceeding 2 m in height. The stems reach a diameter of between 13 and 25 cm. They feature white spines on the subapical areoles. Between 11 and 13 radial spines can be distinguished on the mature areoles.	Chile (Coquimbo)
	Leucostele chiloensis subsp. panhoplites (K.Schum.) Schlumpb., 2021	Low-growing plants, 1 to 1.5 m tall. Forms dense, ascending shrubs.	Chile (Coquimbo)

== Distribution ==
Leucostele chiloensis is found from the north to the south of central Chile, where it grows in coastal areas as well as in valleys and foothills of the Andes at elevations up to 1800 meters. The species was first described as Cactus chiloensis and published in 1826 by Luigi Colla. After several recombinations, Heimo Friedrich and Gordon Douglas Rowley placed it in the genus Echinopsis in 1974.

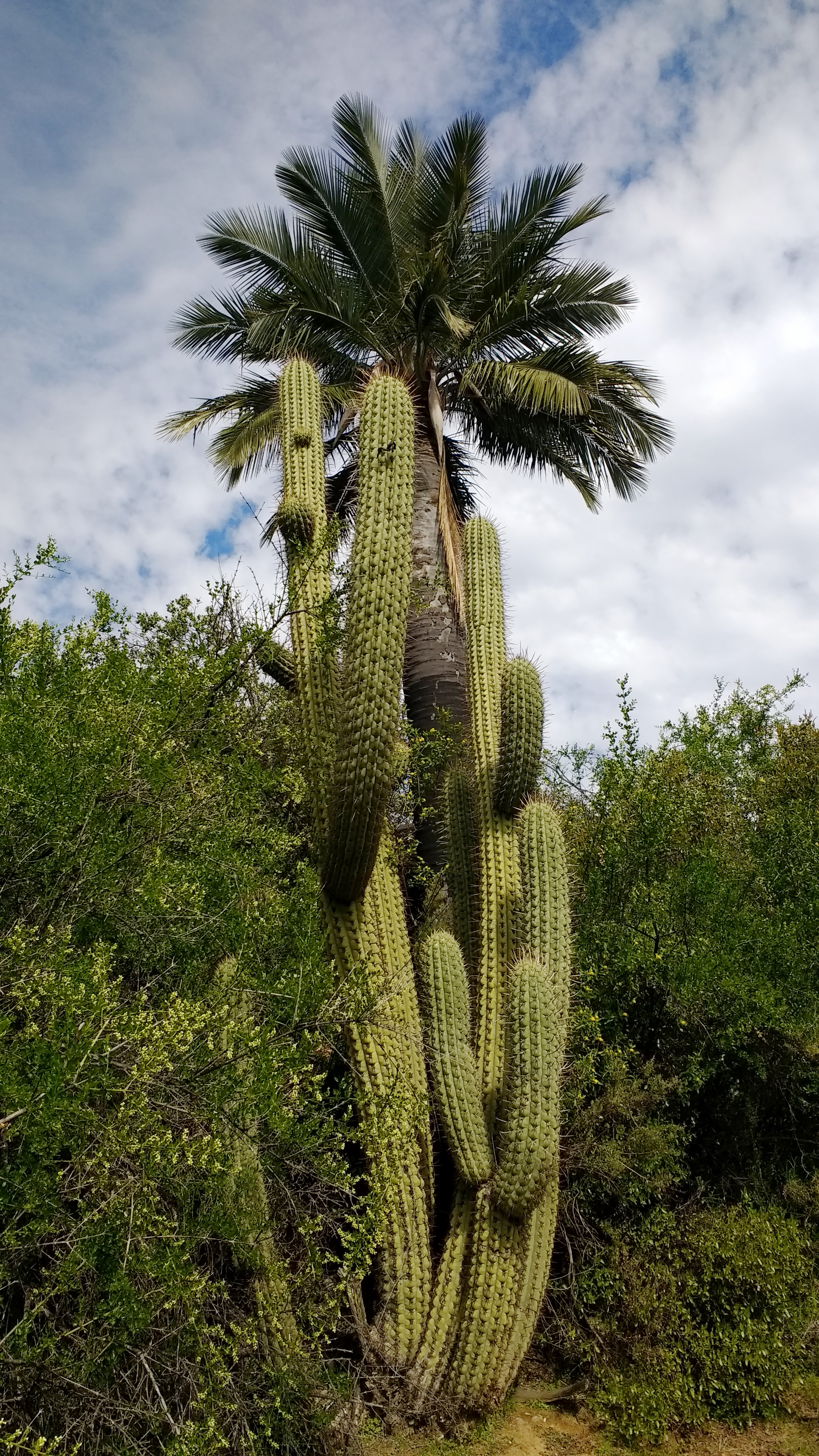
Adult plant at La Campana National Park

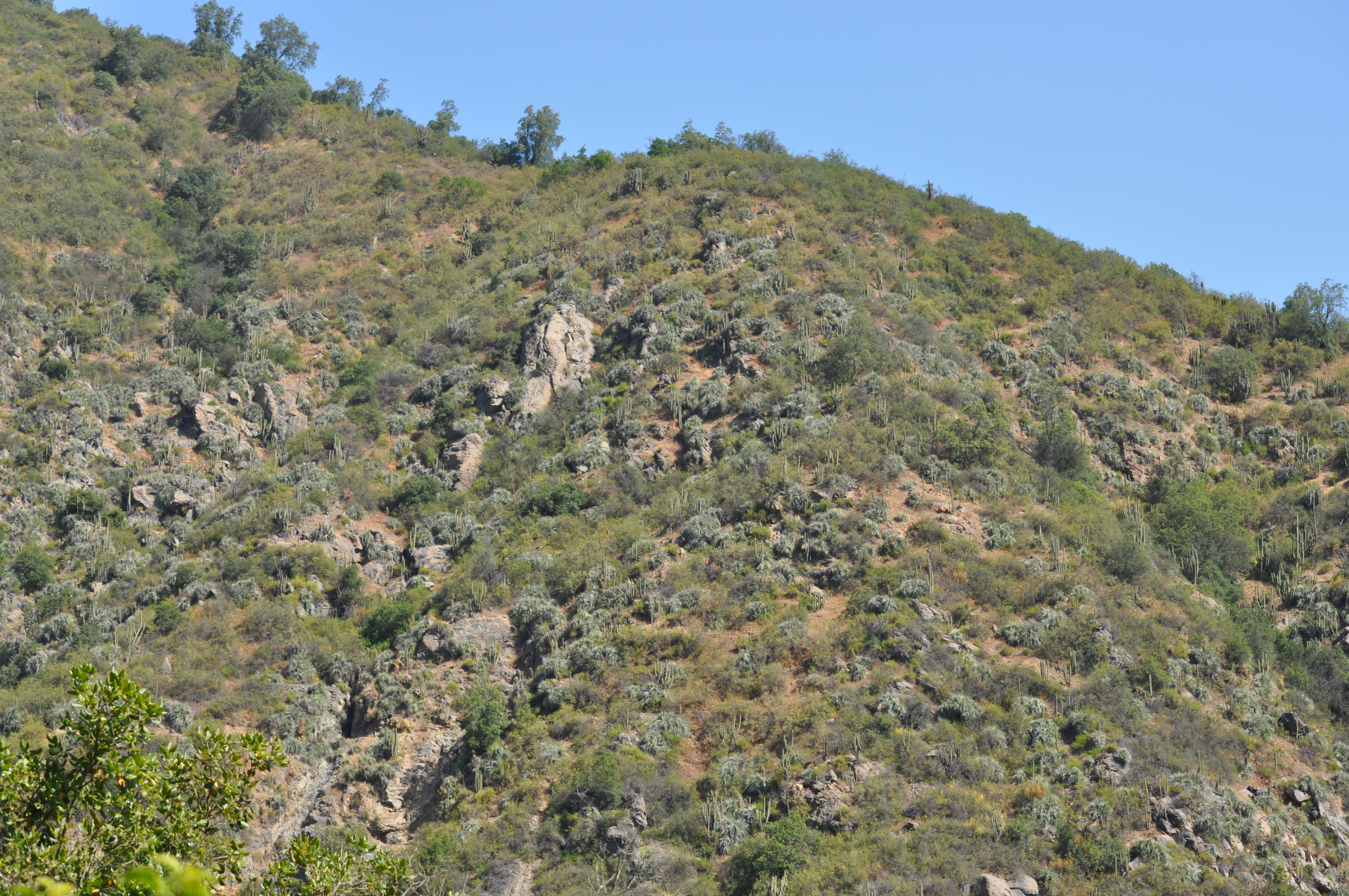
Habitat in La Campana National Park

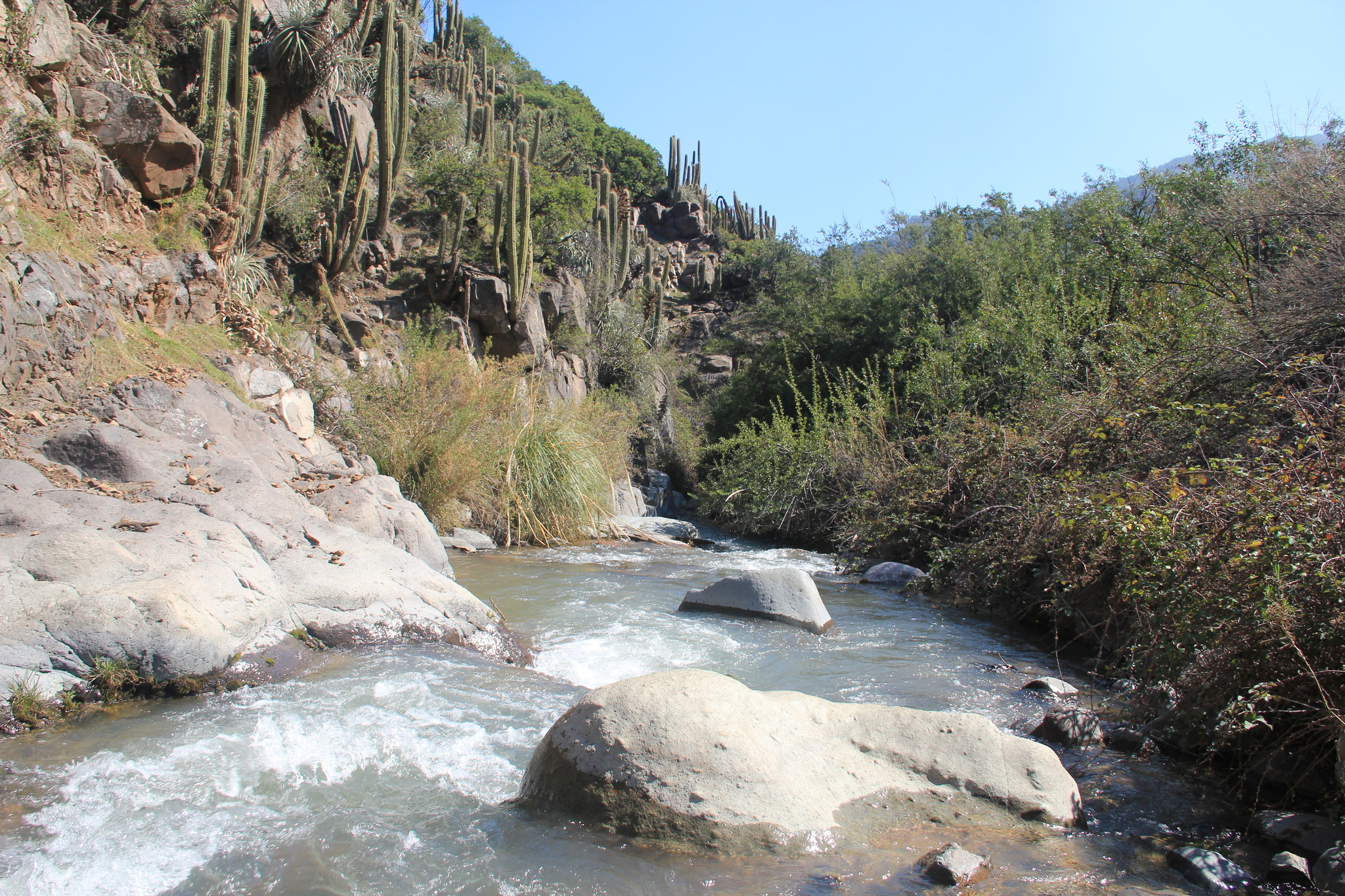
Leucostele chiloensis growing in Lo Barnechea, Chile near Estero Arrayán

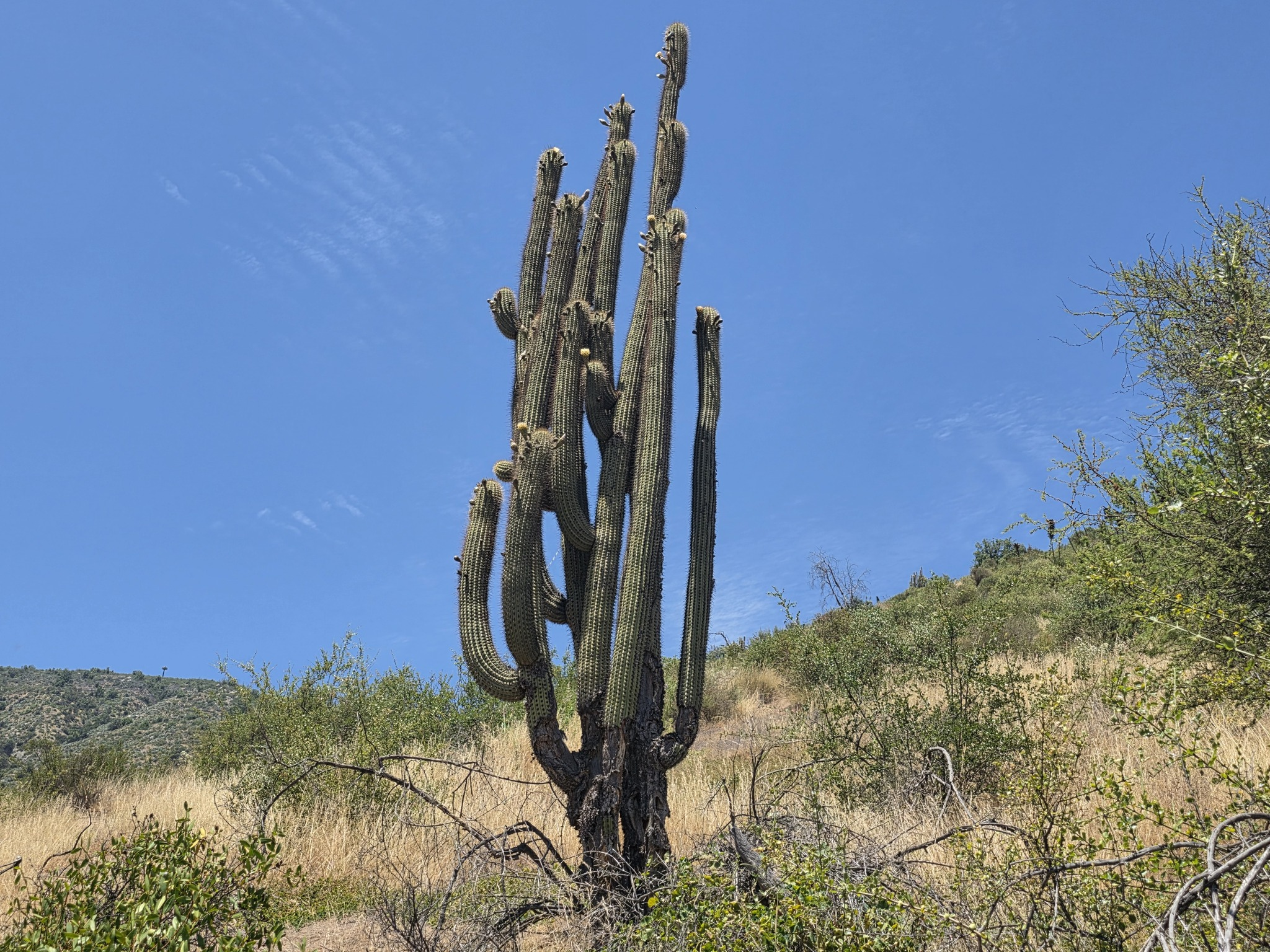
Habitat in Hijuelas, Chile

== Taxonomy ==
This species was first described as Cactus chiloensis in 1826 by the Italian botanist Luigi Aloysius Colla. The species name chiloensis originates from Isla Grande de Chiloé in Chile. However, this was based on an incorrect assumption about where the species is native and Chiloé is well South of its actual range. The Latin suffix "-ensis" is typically used in scientific names to denote geographical origin. Although "chilenis" (meaning "Chilean") is often used informally, the original spelling chiloensis is legally fixed. This is because the International Code of Nomenclature states that once a scientific name is officially published, it cannot be changed. In 2012 Boris O. Schlumpberger transferred the species to the genus Leucostele.
