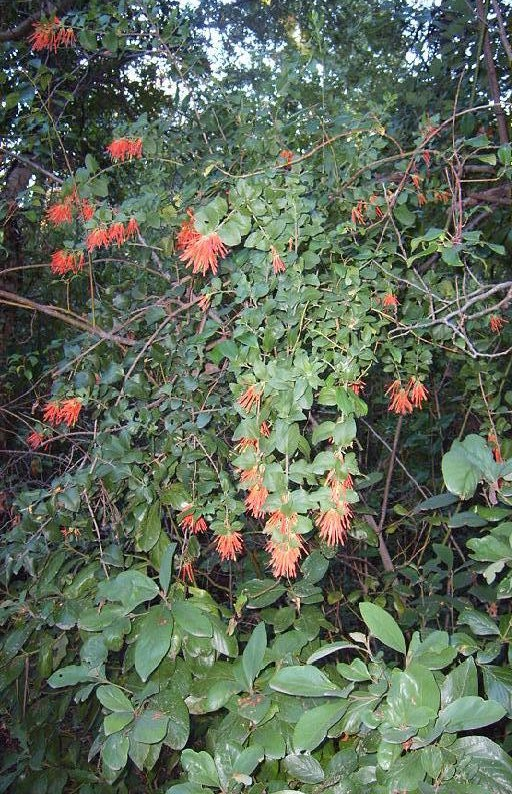
- Tristerix corymbosus

Scientific classification
- Kingdom: Plantae
- Clade: Embryophytes
- Clade: Tracheophytes
- Clade: Spermatophytes
- Clade: Angiosperms
- Clade: Eudicots
- Order: Santalales
- Family: Loranthaceae
- Genus: Tristerix; Mart.

Species
- T. aphyllus; T. chodatianus; T. corymbosus; T. grandiflorus; T. longibracteatus; T. penduliflorus; T. peruvianus; T. peytonii; T. pubescens; T. secundus; T. tetrandrus; T. verticillatus

= Tristerix =

Genus of mistletoes

Tristerix is a genus of mistletoe in the family Loranthaceae, native to the Andes, ranging from Colombia and Ecuador to Chile and Argentina. They are woody perennials usually occurring as aerial parasites, are pollinated by hummingbirds and flowerpiercers, with seed-dispersal generally by birds but occasionally by mammals (Dromiciops). The genus is distinguished from other New World Loranthaceae by its simple, terminal, racemose inflorescences, together with its of 4- or 5-merous flowers, versatile anthers, and the presence of endosperm. Further differences include fused cotyledons and the absence of epicortical roots.

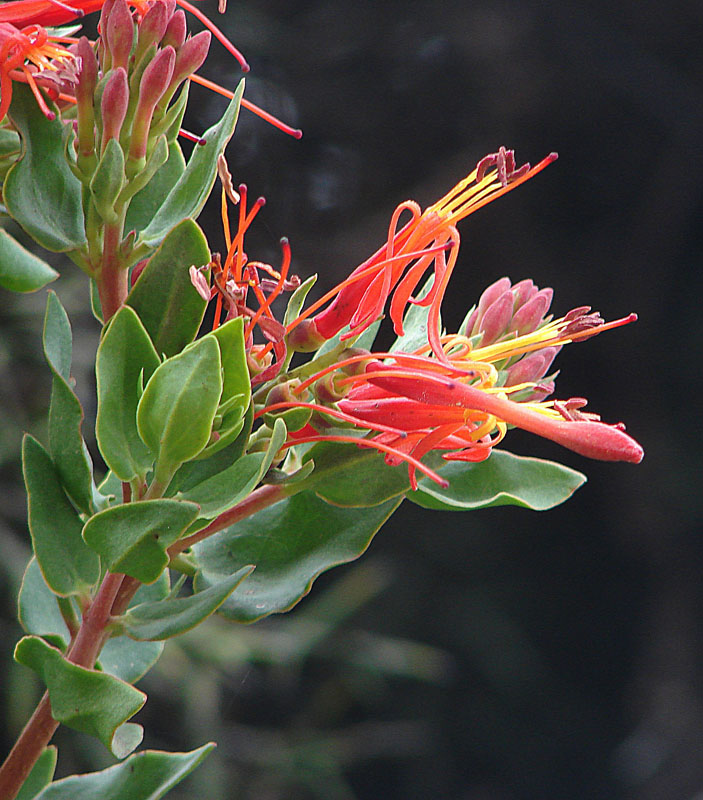
Tristerix pubescens

== Phylogeny ==
Tristerix was first described in 1830 by Martius, who published three species: T. viridiflorus (now Macrosolen viridiflorus, T. tetrandus (now T. corymbosus), and T. reinwardtianus (now Macrosolen avenis). In 1868, Eichler placed Loranthus aphyllus and L. tetrandrus in the genus Phrygillanthus. However, in 1973, Barlow & Wiens recognised these two Phrygilanthus species as Tristerix aphyllus and T. corymbosus, respectively, returning Tristerix to use.

Martius described the genus as having three bracts. However, this characteristic applies to only two species of the genus, (T. aphyllus and T. corymbosus). In these, two bracteoles inside a primary bract lie below the ovary. The other members of the genus have no bracteoles. Van Tieghem (1895) divided the genus into two subgenera, those species without bracteoles - Metastachys (with nine species), and those with bracteoles - Tristerix (with two species, T. aphyllus and T. corymbosus). This division is accepted by Kuijt.

A phylogenetic study of ten Tristerix species by Amico et al. (2007) found evidence for three groupings. A simplified consensus cladogram of their conclusions, from analyses which used two different character sets and three methods (maximum likelihood, minimum parsimony, and Bayesian inference) for finding the tree, is given below. Note that the grouping of the Tristerix species with bracteoles remains.

- - (1)
    - T. longebracteatus
    - T. grandiflorus
    - T. peytonii
    - T. pubescens
    - T. peruvianus
    - T. chodatianus
  - - (2)
      - T. verticillatus
      - T. penduliflorus
    - (3)
      - T. aphyllus
      - T. corymbosus

See

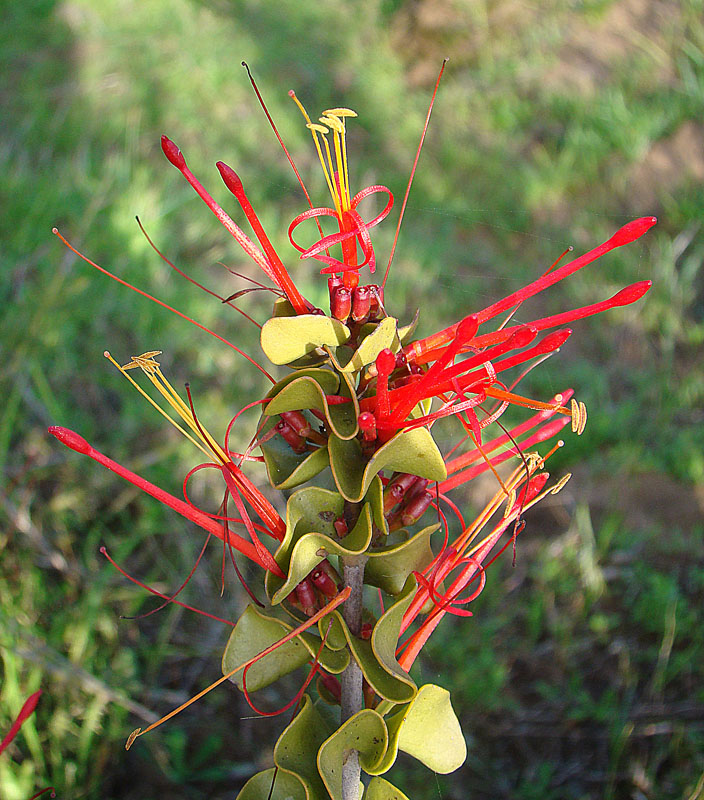
Tristerix corymbosus
