= Ixodes neuquenensis =

Scientific classification
- Kingdom: Animalia
- Phylum: Arthropoda
- Subphylum: Chelicerata
- Class: Arachnida
- Order: Ixodida
- Family: Ixodidae
- Genus: Ixodes
- Species: I. neuquenensis

Binomial name
- Ixodes neuquenensis Ringuelet, 1974

Species of tick

Ixodes neuquenensis is a species of tick that lives on the monito del monte (Dromiciops gliroides), a nocturnal marsupial that lives in the temperate forests of southern South America. Due to the near-threatened status of its host, Ixodes neuquenensis is also at risk.

== Morphology ==
The females of Ixodes neuquenensis resemble other members of subgenus Ixodes but possess some distinct and notable morphological features. Two obvious spurs can be found on coxae II to IV. Two other species, I. theilerae from the Ethiopian realm and I. turdus from the Palaearctic realm, have two spurs on coxae II to IV as well but with differences in both shape and sizing. Female Ixodes neuquenensis also has very well-defined chitinous plaques on the alloscutum. Diagnostic features of the nymph of Ixodes neuquenensis include two spurs on coxae II to IV and the presence of chitinous plaques medial to coxa I. Though identification of the Ixodes neuquenensis larvae is more difficult, they can be separated from various other species by their triangular spurs on coxae II and III.

The males of this species have yet to be described and remain unknown.
