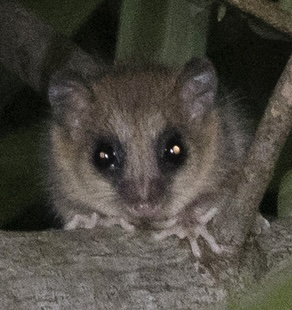

Conservation status
- Near Threatened (IUCN 3.1)

Scientific classification
- Kingdom: Animalia
- Phylum: Chordata
- Class: Mammalia
- Infraclass: Marsupialia
- Order: Microbiotheria
- Family: Microbiotheriidae
- Genus: Dromiciops
- Species: D. gliroides

Binomial name
- Dromiciops gliroides Thomas, 1894

Subspecies
- Dromiciops gliroides gliroides Thomas, 1894; Dromiciops gliroides mondaca D'Elía, Hurtado & D'Anatro, 2016
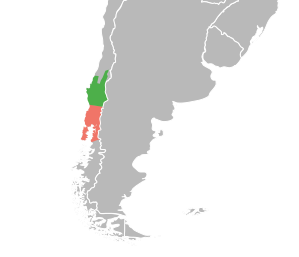
- Distribution rangemap of Microbiotheriidae species. Dromiciops bozinovici in green, Dromiciops gliroides in red.

Synonyms
- Didelphys australis Goldfuss, 1812; Dromiciops australis F. Philippi, 1893

= Southern monito del monte =

Species of marsupial

The southern monito del monte (Dromiciops gliroides) is a species of marsupial.

== Taxonomy and etymology ==
Dromiciops gliroides was formerly considered the sole extant member of the order Microbiotheria. It was first described by British zoologist Oldfield Thomas in 1894. The specific name gliroides is a combination of the Latin glis, gliris ("dormouse", more generally "rodent") and Greek oides ("similar to"). The name australis as a synonym (D. australis, unavailable because it is a junior homonym) refers to the southern distribution of the animal.
