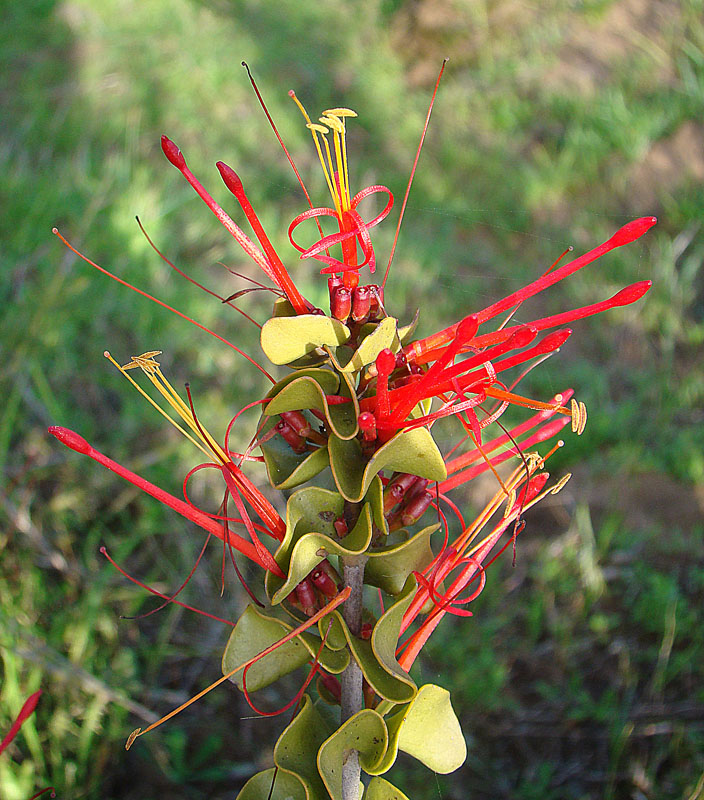

Scientific classification
- Kingdom: Plantae
- Clade: Embryophytes
- Clade: Tracheophytes
- Clade: Angiosperms
- Clade: Eudicots
- Order: Santalales
- Family: Loranthaceae
- Genus: Tristerix
- Species: T. corymbosus

Binomial name
- Tristerix corymbosus (L.) Kuijt 1988

= Tristerix corymbosus =

Species of mistletoe

Tristerix corymbosus, commonly named quintral, cutral, and quitral in Spanish, is a species of Tristerix found in Chile at elevations of 0 to 2075 meters. It is a preferred source of fruit for the monito del monte.
