= Woodburnodon =

Woodburnodon Temporal range: Eocene

Scientific classification
- Kingdom: Animalia
- Phylum: Chordata
- Class: Mammalia
- Infraclass: Marsupialia
- Order: Microbiotheria
- Family: †Woodburnodontidae; Goin et al., 2007
- Genus: †Woodburnodon; Goin et al., 2007
- Species: †W. casei

Binomial name
- †Woodburnodon casei Goin et al., 2007

Extinct genus of marsupial

Woodburnodon is an extinct genus of microbiotherian marsupial whose fossils have been found on Seymour Island, Antarctica. It lived during the Eocene epoch.

== Taxonomy ==
The genus is represented by a single species, Woodburnodon casei, which was described in 2007 from fossils found on the Antarctic Peninsula. Woodburnodon is currently the only formally described genus in the family Woodburnodontidae, although fossils of an unidentified Early Eocene taxon have also been found in Patagonia.

== Description ==
Woodburnodon was the largest known member of the order Microbiotheria. It was at least three or four times larger than the microbiotherid Pachybiotherium, which has been estimated at 215–312 g (7.6–11.0 oz). This would put the size of Woodburnodon at around 1 kg (2.2 lb).
