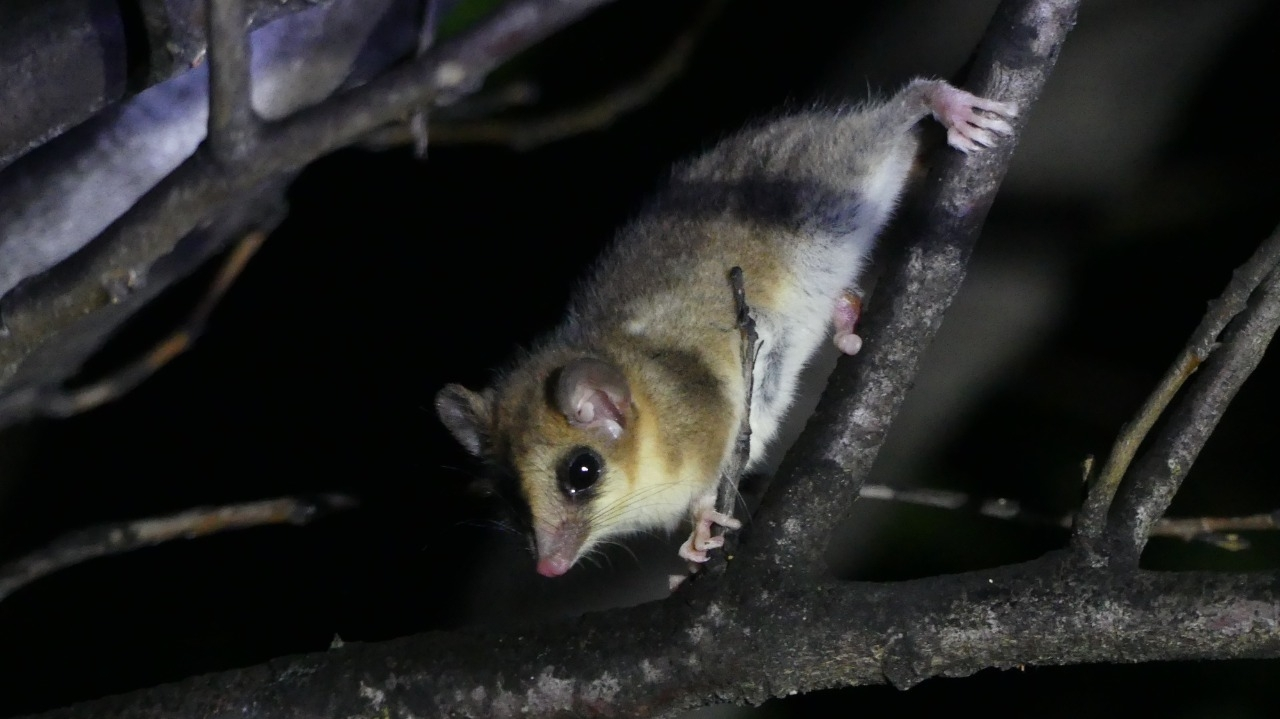

Conservation status
- Near Threatened (IUCN 3.1)

Scientific classification
- Kingdom: Animalia
- Phylum: Chordata
- Class: Mammalia
- Infraclass: Marsupialia
- Order: Microbiotheria
- Family: Microbiotheriidae
- Genus: Dromiciops
- Species: D. bozinovici

Binomial name
- Dromiciops bozinovici D'Elía, Hurtado & D'Anatro, 2016
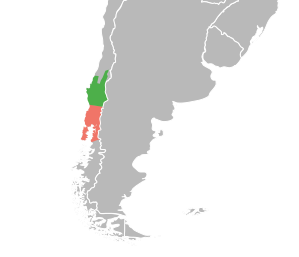
- Distribution rangemap of Microbiotheriidae species. Dromiciops bozinovici in green, Dromiciops gliroides in red.

= Pancho's monito del monte =

Species of marsupial

The pancho's monito del monte (Dromiciops bozinovici) is a species of marsupial in Chile and Argentine. The species was described in 2016 by splitting off the northern population of monitos del monte.

== Distribution ==
This species is found in Chile from 35ºS to 39.3ºS, occurring from the Coastal Cordillera to the Cordillera de los Andes, and in Argentina from 36º 49'S to 39ºS.
