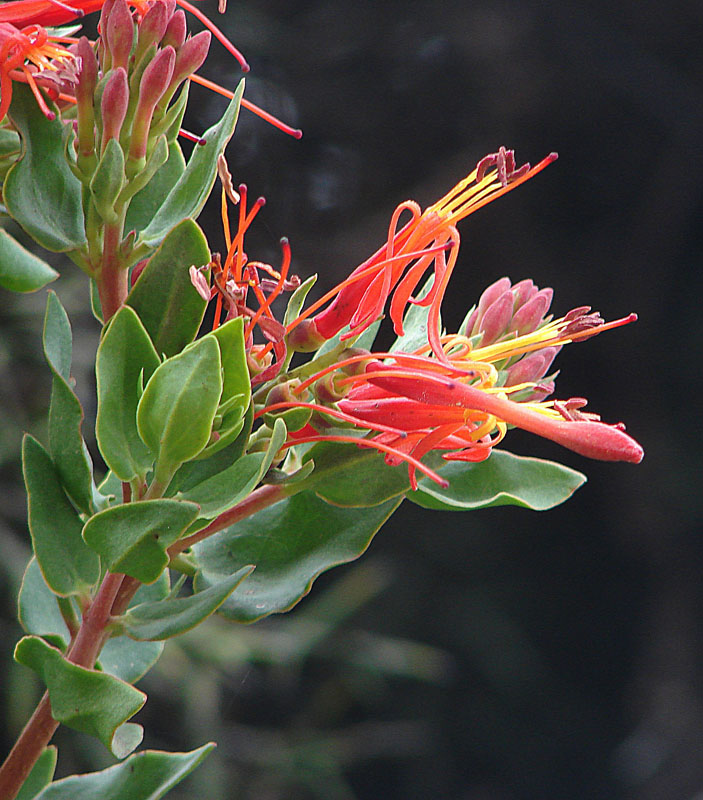

Scientific classification
- Kingdom: Plantae
- Clade: Tracheophytes
- Clade: Angiosperms
- Clade: Eudicots
- Order: Santalales
- Family: Loranthaceae
- Genus: Tristerix
- Species: T. pubescens

Binomial name
- Tristerix pubescens Kuijt 1988

= Tristerix pubescens =

Species of mistletoe

Tristerix pubescens is a species of mistletoe found in Peru at elevations of 1,300 to 4,800 metres. It was described by Kujit in 1988.
