= PXMP4 =

Protein-coding gene in the species Homo sapiens

Identifiers
- Aliases: PXMP4, PMP24, peroxisomal membrane protein 4
- External IDs: OMIM: 616397; MGI: 1891701; HomoloGene: 5237; GeneCards: PXMP4; OMA:PXMP4 - orthologs

Gene location (Human)
Chr.	Chromosome 20 (human)
Band	20q11.22	Start	33,702,758 bp
Band	20q11.22	End	33,720,319 bp

Gene location (Mouse)
Chr.	Chromosome 2 (mouse)
Band	2|2 H1	Start	154,427,678 bp
Band	2|2 H1	End	154,445,628 bp
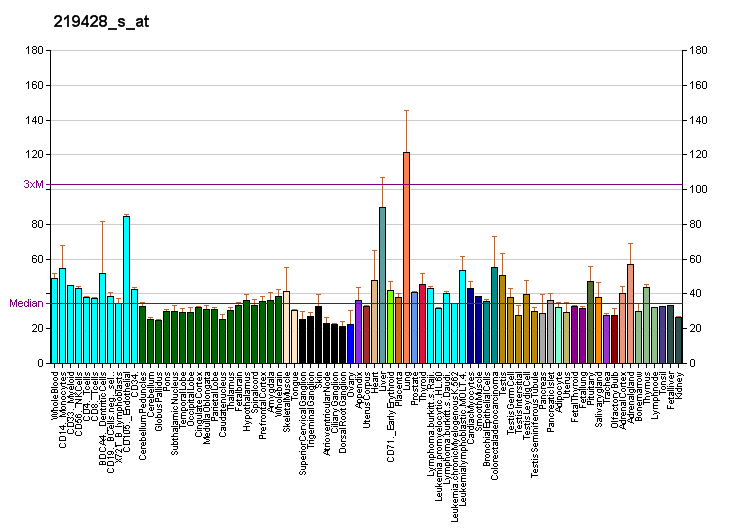
RNA expression pattern
Bgee	Human / Mouse (ortholog); Top expressed in: skin of thigh; right adrenal cortex; pancreatic ductal cell; vulva; left adrenal gland; left adrenal cortex; muscle of thigh; parotid gland; mucosa of ileum; mucosa of transverse colon / Top expressed in: right kidney; lip; left lobe of liver; proximal tubule; human kidney; right ventricle; embryo; brown adipose tissue; muscle of thigh; skin of external ear; More reference expression data
BioGPS	More reference expression data
Gene ontology
Molecular function	protein binding
Cellular component	integral component of membrane; peroxisomal membrane; peroxisome; membrane
Biological process	biological process
Sources:Amigo / QuickGO
Orthologs
Species	Human	Mouse
Entrez	11264	59038
Ensembl	ENSG00000101417	ENSMUSG00000000876
UniProt	Q9Y6I8	Q9JJW0
RefSeq (mRNA)	NM_183397; NM_007238	NM_021534
RefSeq (protein)	NP_009169; NP_899634	NP_067509
Location (UCSC)	Chr 20: 33.7 – 33.72 Mb	Chr 2: 154.43 – 154.45 Mb
PubMed search
- Wikidata
View/Edit Human	View/Edit Mouse

Peroxisomal membrane protein 4 is a protein that in humans is encoded by the PXMP4 gene. PXMP4 is also known as 24kDa peroxisomal intrinsic membrane protein.
