= Estero Arrayán =

Coordinates: 41°25′S 72°58′W

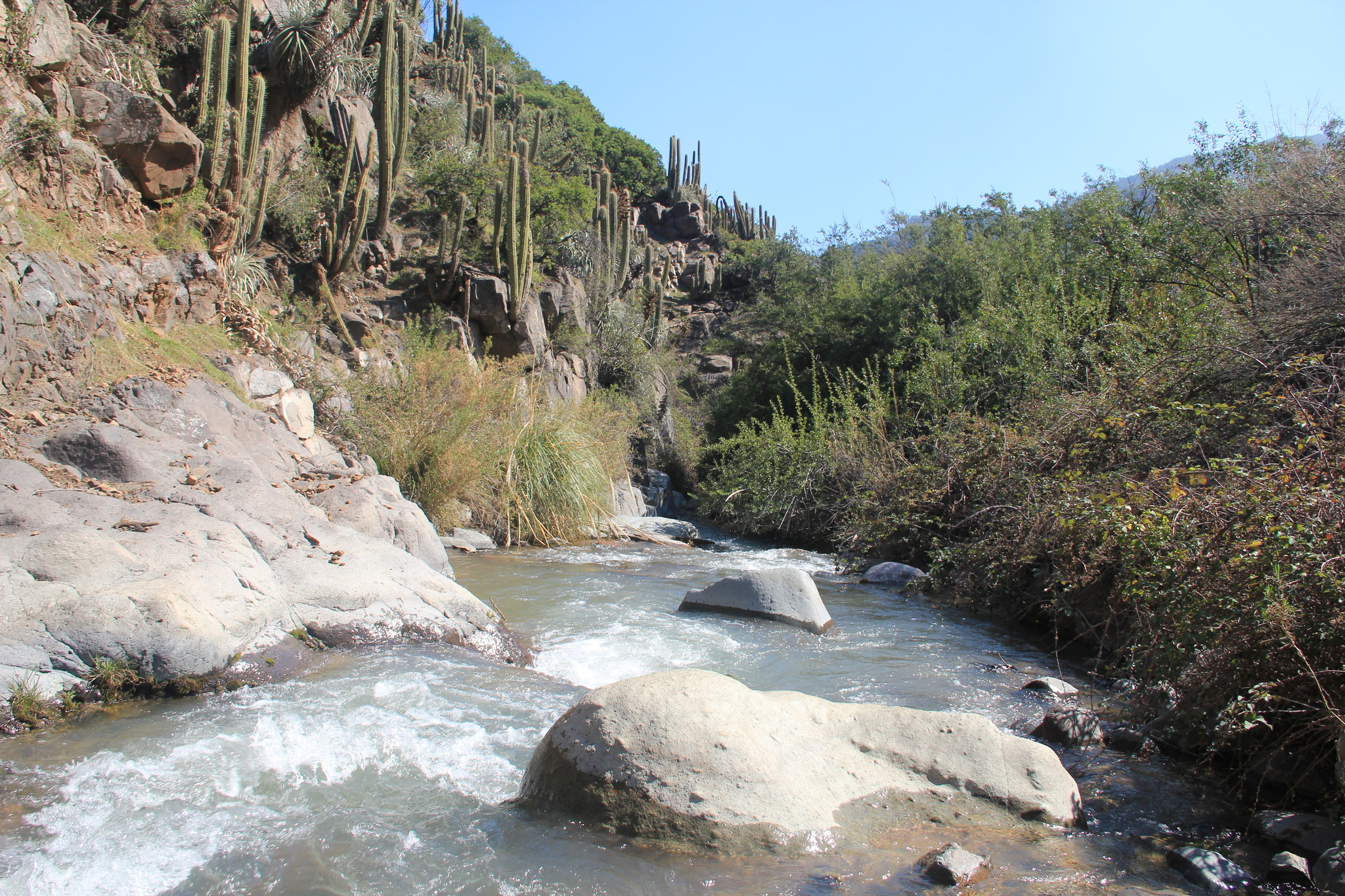
- Estero Arrayán near Lo Barnechea, Chile

Location
- Country: Chile

The Estero Arrayán is a river of Chile.

== See also ==
- List of rivers of Chile
