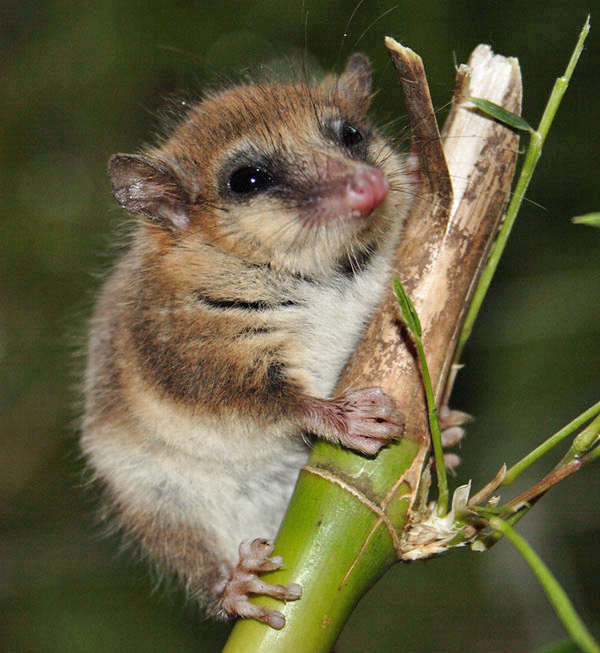

Scientific classification
- Kingdom: Animalia
- Phylum: Chordata
- Class: Mammalia
- Infraclass: Marsupialia
- Order: Microbiotheria
- Family: Microbiotheriidae
- Genus: Dromiciops; Thomas, 1894

Type species
- Dromiciops gliroides Thomas, 1894

Species
- Dromiciops gliroides; Dromiciops bozinovici
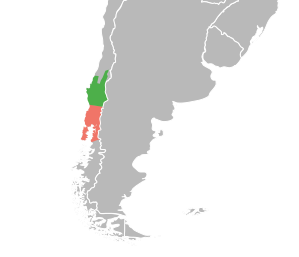
- Distribution rangemap of Microbiotheriidae species. Dromiciops bozinovici in green, Dromiciops gliroides in red.

= Monito del monte =

Genus of marsupial

Monitos del monte or less frequently colocolo opossums, are marsupials native only to south-western South America (Argentina and Chile) in the genus Dromiciops. It is the only extant genus in the ancient order Microbiotheria, and the sole New World representative of the superorder Australidelphia, being more closely related to Australian marsupials than to other American marsupials. The species is nocturnal and arboreal, and lives in thickets of South American mountain bamboo in the Valdivian temperate forests of the southern Andes, aided by its partially prehensile tail. It consumes an omnivorous diet based on insects and fruit.

== Taxonomy and etymology ==
The generic name Dromiciops is based on the resemblance of the monito del monte to the eastern pygmy possum (Cercartetus nanus), one of the synonyms of which is Dromicia nana. The common name monito del monte is Spanish for "little monkey of the bush".

Monitos del monte were formerly considered to consist of a single species, D. gliroides. A 2016 study restricted D. gliroides to the southern part of the genus's range, including Chiloé Island, while describing two new species: D. mondaca from the vicinity of Valdivia and D. bozinovici from the north. The validity of this three-species arrangement was subsequently debated. A 2022 study recognized two species—D. gliroides and D. bozinovici—and classified D. g. mondaca as a subspecies.

=== Species ===
There are two species placed in this genus:

- Southern monito del monte, D. gliroides
- Pancho's monito del monte, D. bozinovici

== Phylogeny and biogeography ==
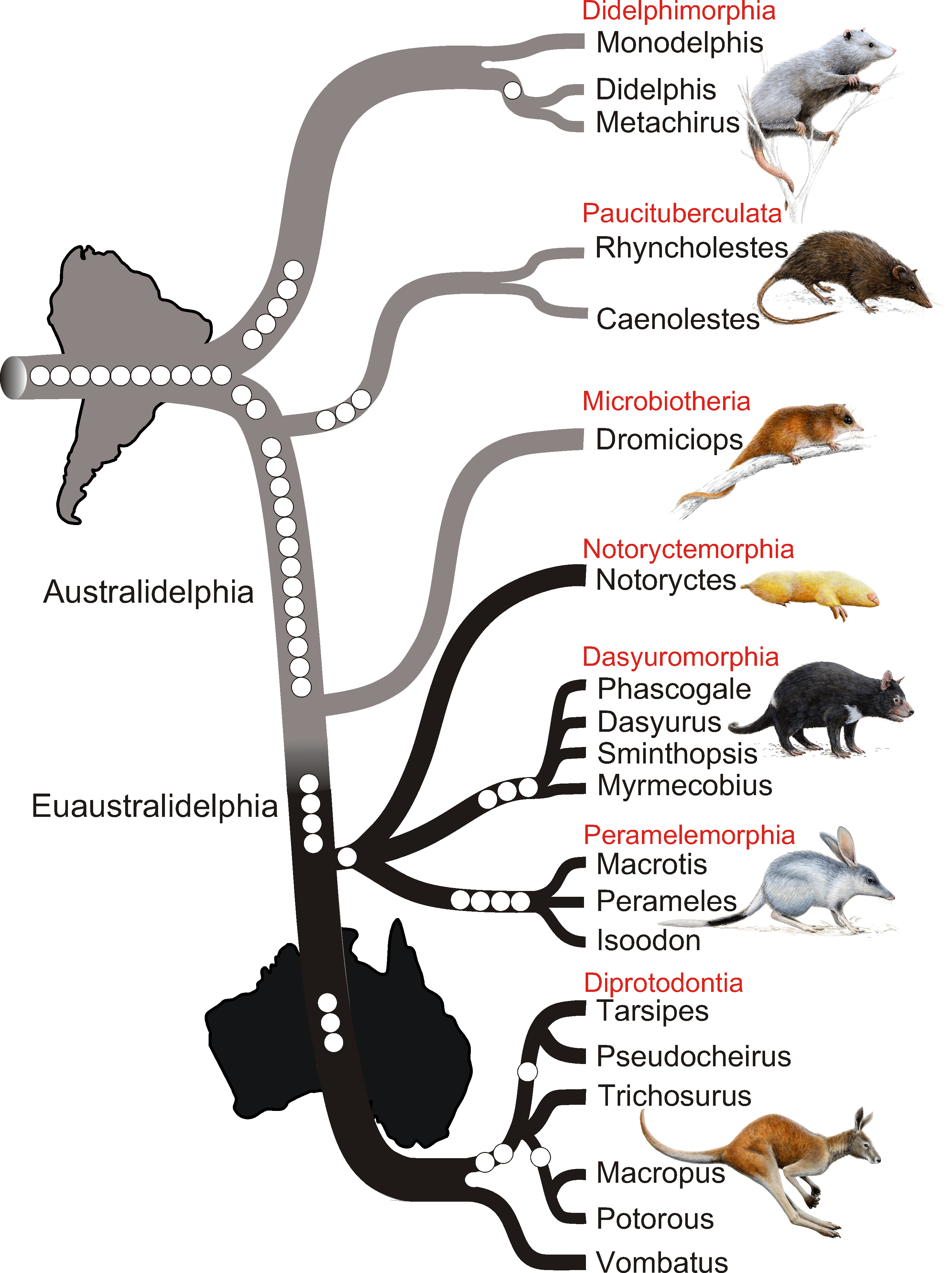
Phylogenetic and biogeographic position of the monito del monte relative to other extant marsupials

South American marsupials have long been suspected to be ancestral to those of Australia, consistent with the fact that the two continents were connected via Antarctica in the early Cenozoic. Australia's earliest known marsupial is Djarthia, a primitive mouse-like animal that lived in the early Eocene about 55 million years ago (mya). Djarthia had been identified as the earliest known australidelphian, and this research suggested that the monito del monte was the last of a clade that included Djarthia. This relationship suggests that the ancestors of the monito del monte might have reached South America by back-migration from Australia. The time of divergence between the monito del monte and Australian marsupials was estimated to have been 46 mya.

Dromiciops is thought to have evolved from members of the genus Microbiotherium, known from the early Miocene of South America, with some authors considering the genera indistinguishable. All other genera, like Pachybiotherium, had become extinct by the late Miocene.

However, in 2010, analysis of retrotransposon insertion sites in the nuclear DNA of a variety of marsupials, while confirming the placement of the monito del monte in Australidelphia, also clarified that its lineage is the most basal of that superorder. The study further confirmed that the most basal of all marsupial orders are the other two South American lineages (Didelphimorphia and Paucituberculata, with the former probably branching first). This conclusion indicates that Australidelphia arose in South America (along with the ancestors of all other living marsupials), and probably reached Australia in a single dispersal event after Microbiotheria split off. Fossils of another Eocene australidelphian, the microbiotherian Woodburnodon casei, have been described from the Antarctic Peninsula, and fossils of a related early Eocene woodburnodontid have been found in Patagonia.

== Habitat ==
Monitos del monte live in the dense forests of highland Argentina and Chile, mainly in trees, where they construct spherical nests of water-resistant colihue leaves. These leaves are then lined with moss or grass, and placed in well-protected areas of the tree, such as underbrush, tree cavities, or fallen timber. The nests are sometimes covered with gray moss as a form of camouflage. These nests provide the monito del monte with some protection from cold, both when it is active and when it hibernates.

Fragmentation of Valdivian temperate rainforests into non-contiguous areas is known to reduce the abundance of monitos del monte in a given area, but has little or no impact on whether it occurs in an area or not.

== Morphology ==
Monitos del monte are small marsupials that look like mice. Dromiciops have the same dental formula as Didelphids: 5.1.3.44.1.3.4, a total of 50 teeth. Their size ranges from 16–42 g (0.56–1.48 oz). They have short and dense fur that is primarily brown-gray with patches of white at their shoulders and back, and their underside is more of a cream or light gray color. Monitos del monte also have distinct black rings around their eyes. Their small furred ears are well-rounded and their rostrums are short. The head to body length is around 8–13 cm (3.1–5.1 in), and their tail length is between 9 and 13 cm (3.5 and 5.1 in). Their tails are somewhat prehensile and mostly furred with the exception of 25–30 mm (0.98–1.18 in) of the underside. The naked underside of their tails may contribute to increasing friction when the mammal is on a tree. The base of their tails also functions as a fat storage organ which they use during winter hibernation. In a week, Monitos del monte can store enough fat to double their body size.

=== Sexual dimorphism ===
At the end of the summer, female monitos del monte tend to be larger and heavier than males. The tails of the sexes also vary in size during this time; females have a thicker tail, which is where they store fat; the difference suggests that females need more energy than males during hibernation. The sexual dimorphism is only seen during this time and not year-round.

== Reproduction ==
Monitos del monte have a monogamous mating system. The females have well-formed, fur-lined pouch containing four teats. They normally reproduce in the spring once a year and can have a litter size varying from one to five. They can feed a maximum of four offspring, so if there are five young, one will not survive. When the young are mature enough to leave the pouch, approximately five months, they are nursed in a distinctive nest. They are then carried on the mother's back. The young remain in association with the mother after weaning. Males and females both reach sexual maturity after two years.

== Habits ==
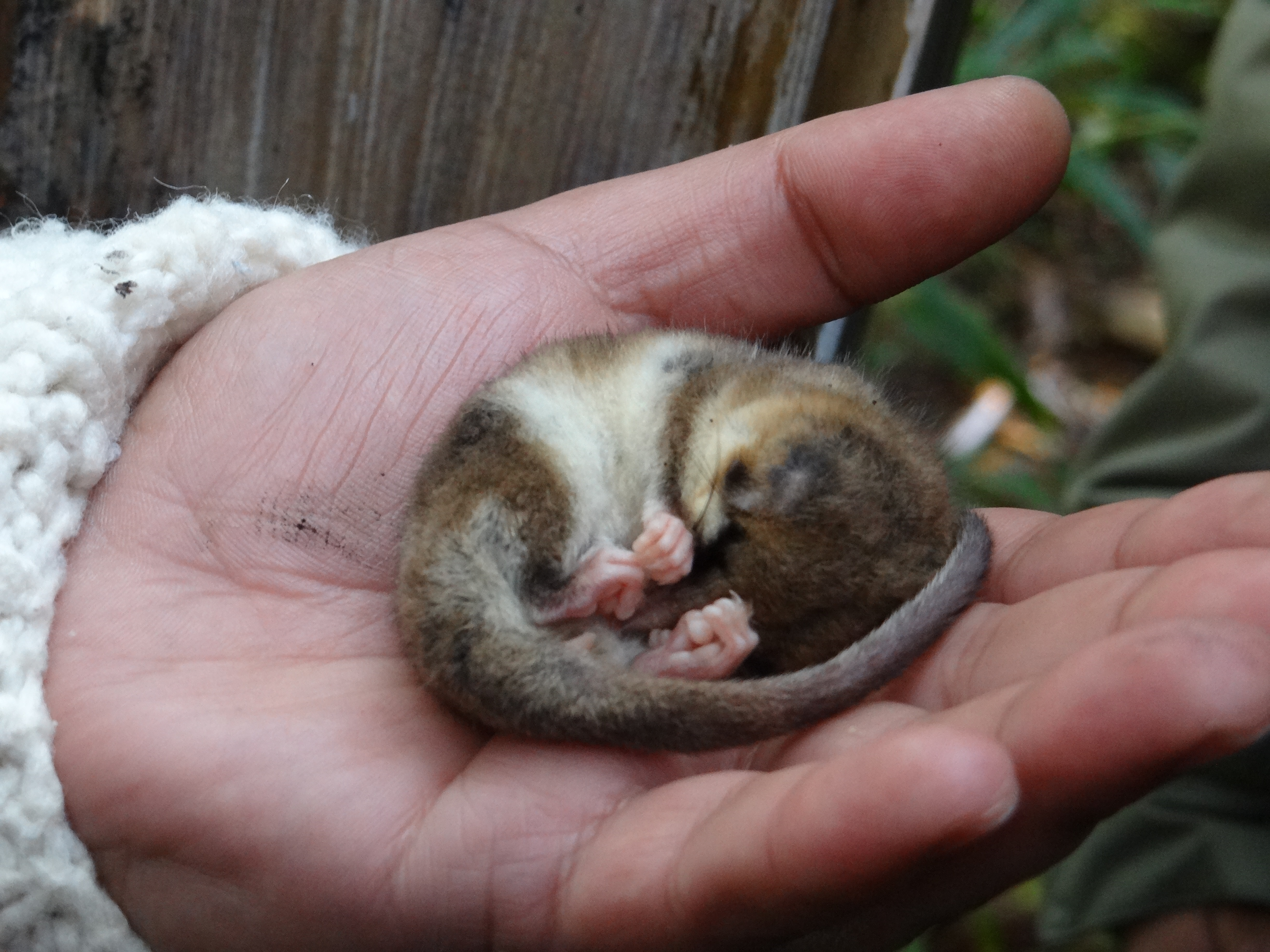
A monito del monte in state of torpor.

The monito del monte is adapted to arboreal life; its tail and paws are prehensile. It is largely nocturnal and, depending on the ambient and internal temperature, and on the availability of food, it spends much of the day in a state of torpor. Such behaviour enables it to survive periods of extreme weather and food shortage, conserving energy instead of foraging to no effect.

The animal covers its nest with moss for concealment, and for insulation and protection from bad weather.

== Diet ==
The monito del monte depends on consuming both insects and fruit, with either component individually being nutritionally unbalanced. Fruit consumed comes from 16 species of plant, with the mistletoe species Tristerix corymbosus being a preferred source of fruit. A study performed in the temperate forests of southern Argentina showed a mutualistic seed dispersal relationship between D. gliroides and Tristerix corymbosus. The monito del monte is the sole dispersal agent for this plant, and without it the plant would likely become extinct. The monito del monte eats the fruit of T. corymbosus, and germination takes place in the gut.

== Conservation ==
For the past few years the number of Dromiciops has declined, and the species is now classified as "near threatened". Many factors contribute to the decline:

- its already limited habitat is constantly faced with deforestation and fragmentation;
- the introduction of the domestic cat (Felis catus) is correlated with decrease in numbers of Dromiciops
- the creature is considered bad luck by natives – houses have been burned down after monitos del monte were seen inside;
- other people believe this marsupial is venomous or causes disease, though in reality they do not affect humans negatively.

The monito del monte is not the only organism which will be affected if it becomes endangered. Dromiciops illustrate parasite-host specificity with the tick Ixodes neuquenensis. This tick can only be found on the monito del monte, so it depends on the survival of this nearly endangered mammal. T. corymbosus also depends on the survival of this species, because without the seed dispersal agency of the monito del monte, it would not be able to reproduce.

Currently, there are minimal conservation efforts. Ecological studies are being conducted in the Chiloé Island that might help future conservation efforts. Dromiciops has been found in the Los Ruiles National Reserve and the Valdivian Coastal Reserve, which are protected areas in Chile and the Nothofagus forest of Parque Nacional Los Alerces, Chubut, Southern Argentina.

== Sources ==
- Amico, G. C.; Rodriguez-Cabal, M. A.; Aizen, M. A. (2009). "The potential key seed-dispersing role of the arboreal marsupial Dromiciops gliroides". Acta Oecologica. 35 (1). Elsevier: 8–13. Bibcode:2009AcO....35....8A. doi:10.1016/j.actao.2008.07.003.
- Beck, R. M. D.; Godthelp, H.; Weisbecker, V.; Archer, M.; Hand, S. J. (2008). Hawks, John (ed.). "Australia's Oldest Marsupial Fossils and their Biogeographical Implications". PLoS ONE. 3 (3) e1858. Public Library of Science. Bibcode:2008PLoSO...3.1858B. doi:10.1371/journal.pone.0001858. PMC 2267999. PMID 18365013.
- Brugni, N.; Flores, V. R. (2007). "Allassogonoporus dromiciops n. sp. (Digenea: Allassogonoporidae) from Dromiciops gliroides (Marsupialia: Microbiotheriidae) in Patagonia, Argentina". Systematic Parasitology. 68 (1). Springer: 45–48. doi:10.1007/s11230-006-9083-1. PMID 17401634. S2CID 19824746.
- Chester, S. (2008). A wildlife guide to Chile: continental Chile, Chilean Antarctica, Easter Island, Juan Fernandez Archipelago (1 ed.). Princeton, NJ: Princeton University Press. p. 292. ISBN 978-0-691-12976-1.
- Chick, J. (2013). "Dromiciops gliroides". Animal Diversity Web. University of Michigan.
- Martin, G.M.; Flores, D.; Teta, P. (2015). "Dromiciops gliroides". IUCN Red List of Threatened Species. 2015. IUCN: e.T6834A22180239. doi:10.2305/IUCN.UK.2015-4.RLTS.T6834A22180239.en.
- "Monito del monte (Dromiciops gliroides)". EDGE of Existence programme. Zoological Society of London. 2006. Archived from the original on 2010-09-22.
- Feldhamer, G. A. (2007). Mammalogy: adaptation, diversity, ecology (3rd ed.). Baltimore: Johns Hopkins University Press. ISBN 978-0-8018-8695-9.
- Garcia, D.; Rodríguez-Cabal, M. A.; Amico, G. C. (2009). "Seed dispersal by a frugivorous marsupial shapes the spatial scale of a mistletoe population". Journal of Ecology. 97 (2). British Ecological Society: 217–229. Bibcode:2009JEcol..97..217G. doi:10.1111/j.1365-2745.2008.01470.x. hdl:10651/8889.
- Guglielmone, A. A.; Venzal, J. M.; Amico, G.; Mangold, A. J.; Keirans, J. E. (2004). "Description of the nymph and larva and redescription of the female of Ixodes neuquenensis Ringuelet, 1947 (Acari: Ixodidae), a parasite of the endangered Neotropical marsupial Dromiciops gliroides Thomas (Microbiotheria: Microbiotheriidae)". Systematic Parasitology. 57 (3): 211–9. doi:10.1023/B:SYPA.0000019082.96187.9c. PMID 15010595. S2CID 26594474.
- Gurovich, Y.; Stannard, H.; Old, J. (2015). "The presence of the marsupial Dromiciops gliroides in Parque Nacional Los Alerces, Chubut, Southern Argentina, after the synchronous maturation and flowering of native bamboo and subsequent rodent irruption". Revista Chilena de Historia Natural. 88 (1): 17. Bibcode:2015RvCHN..88...17G. doi:10.1186/s40693-015-0047-1.
- Inman, M. (2010). "Jumping Genes Reveal Kangaroos' Origins". PLOS Biology. 8 (7) e1000437. Public Library of Science. doi:10.1371/journal.pbio.1000437. PMC 2910652. PMID 20668663.
- Lidicker, W. Z.; Ghiselin, M. T. (1996). Biology. Menlo Park, California: The Benjamin/Cummings Publishing Company.
- Lord, R. D. (2007). Mammals of South America. Johns Hopkins University Press.
- Macdonald, D., ed. (1995). Encyclopedia of mammals (2nd ed.). Andromeda Oxford. ISBN 978-1-871869-62-0.
- Nilsson, M. A.; Churakov, G.; Sommer, M.; Van Tran, N.; Zemann, A.; Brosius, J.; Schmitz, J. (2010). Penny, D. (ed.). "Tracking Marsupial Evolution Using Archaic Genomic Retroposon Insertions". PLOS Biology. 8 (7) e1000436. Public Library of Science. doi:10.1371/journal.pbio.1000436. PMC 2910653. PMID 20668664.
- Nowak, R. M.; Dickman, C. R. (2005). Walker's Marsupials of the World. Johns Hopkins University Press.
- Schiewe, J. (2010-07-28). "Australia's marsupials originated in what is now South America, study says". Los Angeles Times.
- Spotorno, A. E.; Marin, J. C.; Yevenes, M.; Walker, L. I.; Fernández-Donoso, R. F.; Pincheira, J.; Berrios, M. S.; Palma, R. E. (1997). "Chromosome Divergences Among American Marsupials and the Australian Affinities of the American Dromiciops". Journal of Mammalian Evolution. 4 (4). Springer: 259–269. doi:10.1023/A:1027374514503. S2CID 36199158.
- Thomas, Oldfied (1894). "On Micoureus* griseus, Desm., with the Description of a new Genus and Species of Didelphyidae". The Annals and Magazine of Natural History; Zoology, Botany, and Geology. 6. 14 (81): 184–188. doi:10.1080/00222939408677788. hdl:2027/hvd.32044107329807.
