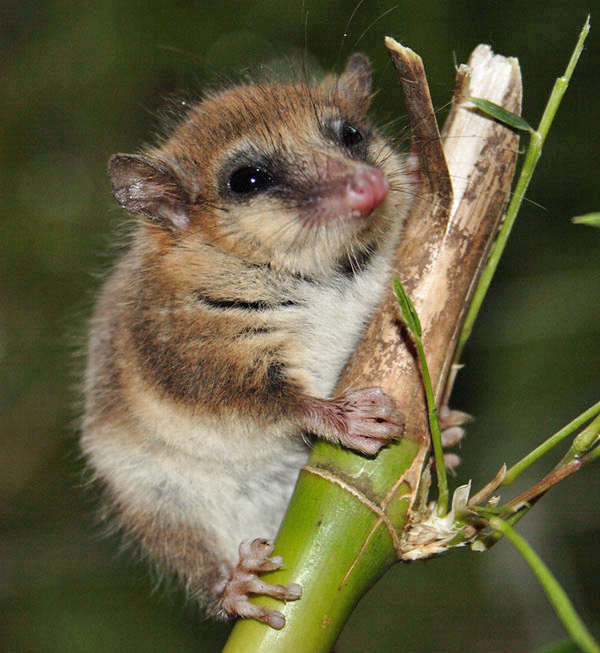
- Dromiciops gliroides

Scientific classification
- Kingdom: Animalia
- Phylum: Chordata
- Class: Mammalia
- Infraclass: Marsupialia
- Superorder: Australidelphia
- Order: Microbiotheria
- Family: Microbiotheriidae; Ameghino, 1887

Type genus
- Microbiotherium† Ameghino, 1887

Genera
- †Clenia; Dromiciops; †Eomicrobiotherium; †Ideodelphys?; †Khasia; †Microbiotherium; †Mirandatherium; †Oligobiotherium; †Pachybiotherium

= Microbiotheriidae =

Microbiotheriidae Temporal range: Early Paleocene–Recent

Family of marsupials

Microbiotheriidae is a family of australidelphian marsupials represented by only two extant species, the Southern and Pancho's monito del montes, and a number of extinct species known from fossils in South America, Western Antarctica, and northeastern Australia.

Microbiotheriids were once thought to be members of the order Didelphimorphia (which contains the Virginia opossum); however, an accumulation of both anatomical and genetic evidence in recent years has led to the conclusion that microbiotheriids and other microbiotheres are not didelphids at all, but are instead most closely related to the Australasian marsupials; together, the microbiotheres and the Australian orders form the clade Australidelphia which are now thought to have first evolved in the South American region of Gondwana.

== Biogeography and evolution ==
The oldest microbiotheriid and microbiothere currently recognised is Khasia cordillerensis, based on fossil teeth from Early Palaeocene deposits at Tiupampa, Bolivia. Numerous genera are known from various Palaeogene and Neogene fossil sites in South America. A number of possible microbiotheres, again represented by isolated teeth, have also been recovered from the Middle Eocene La Meseta Formation of Seymour Island, Western Antarctica. Finally, several undescribed microbiotheres have been reported from the Early Eocene Tingamarra Local Fauna in northeastern Australia; if this is indeed the case, then these Australian fossils have important implications for understanding marsupial evolution and biogeography. The distant ancestors of the monito del monte, it is thought, remained in what is now South America while others entered Antarctica and eventually Australia during the time when all three continents were joined as part of Gondwana.

Dromiciops is thought to have evolved from members of the genus Microbiotherium, known from the early Miocene of South America, with some authors considering the genera indistinguishable. All other genera, like Pachybiotherium, had become extinct by the late Miocene.
