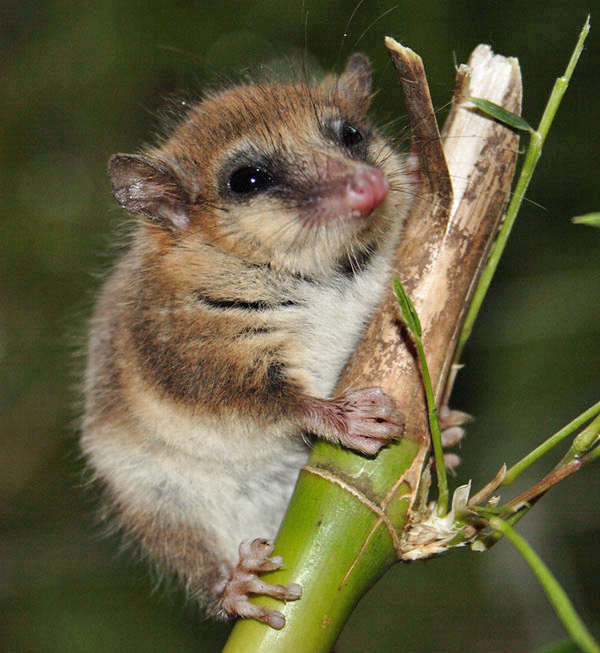
- Dromiciops gliroides

Scientific classification
- Kingdom: Animalia
- Phylum: Chordata
- Class: Mammalia
- Infraclass: Marsupialia
- Superorder: Australidelphia
- Order: Microbiotheria; Ameghino, 1889

Families
- Microbiotheriidae †Woodburnodontidae

= Microbiotheria =

Microbiotheres Temporal range: Early Paleocene–Recent

Order of marsupials

Microbiotheria is an australidelphian marsupial order that encompasses two families, one living, the Microbiotheriidae, and the extinct Eocene period Woodburnodontidae. It is represented by only two extant species, the Southern and Pancho's monito del montes, and a number of extinct species known from fossils in South America, Western Antarctica, and northeastern Australia.

Although once thought to be members of the order Didelphimorphia (the order that contains the Virginia opossum), an accumulation of both anatomical and genetic evidence in recent years has led to the conclusion that microbiotheres are not didelphids at all, but are instead most closely related to the Australasian marsupials; together, the microbiotheres and the Australian orders form the clade Australidelphia which are now thought to have first evolved in the South American region of Gondwana.

== Biogeography ==
The oldest microbiothere currently recognised is Khasia cordillerensis, based on fossil teeth from Early Palaeocene deposits at Tiupampa, Bolivia. Numerous genera are known from various Palaeogene and Neogene fossil sites in South America. A number of possible microbiotheres, again represented by isolated teeth, have also been recovered from the Middle Eocene La Meseta Formation of Seymour Island, Western Antarctica. Finally, several undescribed microbiotheres have been reported from the Early Eocene Tingamarra Local Fauna in northeastern Australia; if this is indeed the case, then these Australian fossils have important implications for understanding marsupial evolution and biogeography. The distant ancestors of the monito del monte, it is thought, remained in what is now South America while others entered Antarctica and eventually Australia during the time when all three continents were joined as part of Gondwana.
