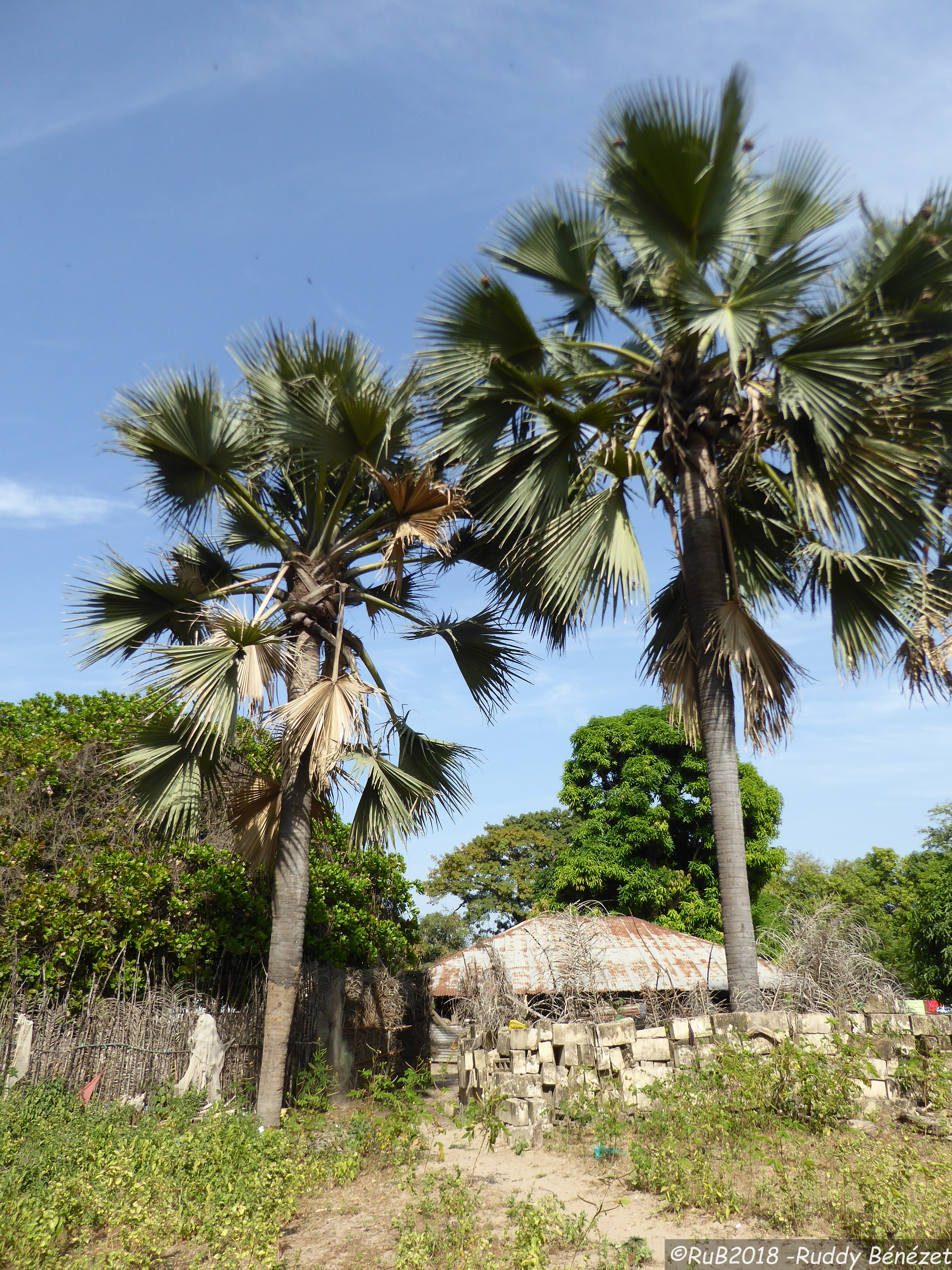
- Habit in Casamance, Senegal

Scientific classification
- Kingdom: Plantae
- Clade: Tracheophytes
- Clade: Angiosperms
- Clade: Monocots
- Clade: Commelinids
- Order: Arecales
- Family: Arecaceae
- Genus: Borassus
- Species: B. akeassii

Binomial name
- Borassus akeassii Bayton, Ouédr. & Guinko, 2006

Synonyms
- Borassus aethiopum var. domesticus A. Chev.

= Borassus akeassii =

Ake Assi's palmyra palm

Species of palm

Borassus akeassii is a species of palmyra palm which is native to west and central Africa. It occurs from Senegal to Congo-Kinshasa. It was first described in 2006, having previously been confused with Borassus aethiopum and Borassus flabellifer. It is used by local people for a variety of purposes, particularly sap extraction.

== Description ==
This palm reaches impressive height of 15 meters, typically developing a noticeably swollen trunk that may bear numerous irregular scars, often a result of external influences. The crown consists of a moderate to dense number of glaucous, fan-shaped leaves, each supported by a sturdy petiole with either serrated black teeth along the edges or, in some cases, nearly smooth margins. The leaf blade is relatively flat, divided into numerous rigid leaflets with pointed tips that may split over time. Fine, persistent hairs can sometimes be found along the ribs of younger leaves, gradually fading as they mature. The adaxial hastula is well-defined, while the abaxial hastula remains less pronounced.

Male and female inflorescences are distinctly structured, with the former branching multiple times and forming catkin-like spikes, while the latter tends to be either spicate or minimally branched. The rachillae of male flowers often end in small, rounded projections, housing tightly arranged clusters of blossoms. Female flowers are significantly larger, spirally arranged along the rachis, and enclosed within protective bracts. The fruits are notably large, ovoid, and slightly pointed at the tip, releasing a distinct fragrance as they ripen to a yellowish-green hue. Each fruit contains one to three sizable seeds encased in a tough, woody endocarp. Pollen grains exhibit a reticulate texture, with a dense covering of minute surface structures. The palm’s striking appearance and structural adaptations make it a noteworthy presence in its habitat.

== Gallery ==
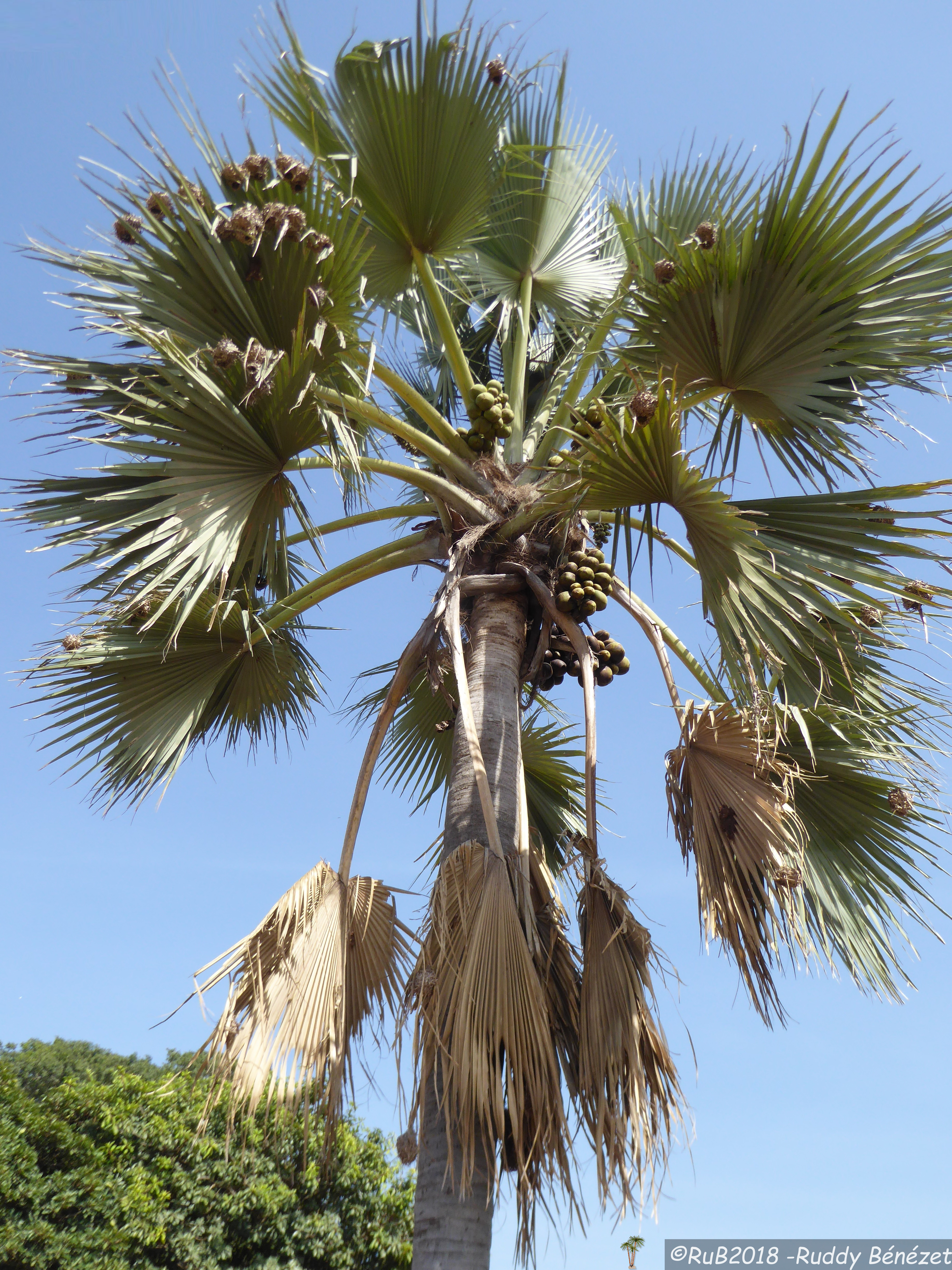
Canopy with fruit and weaver nests

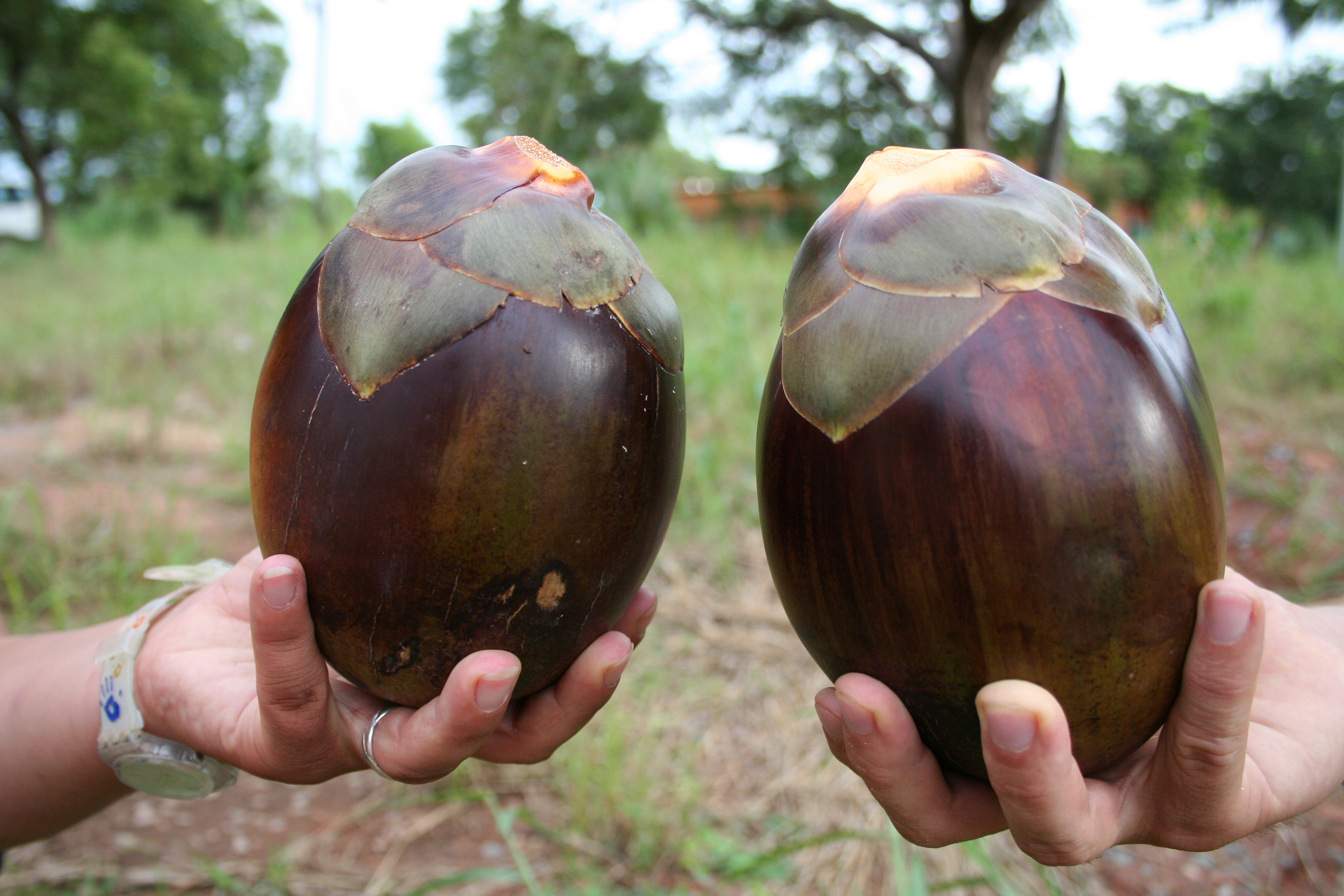
Fruit
