= Palmyra sprout =

Sprout that grows on Palmyra palms

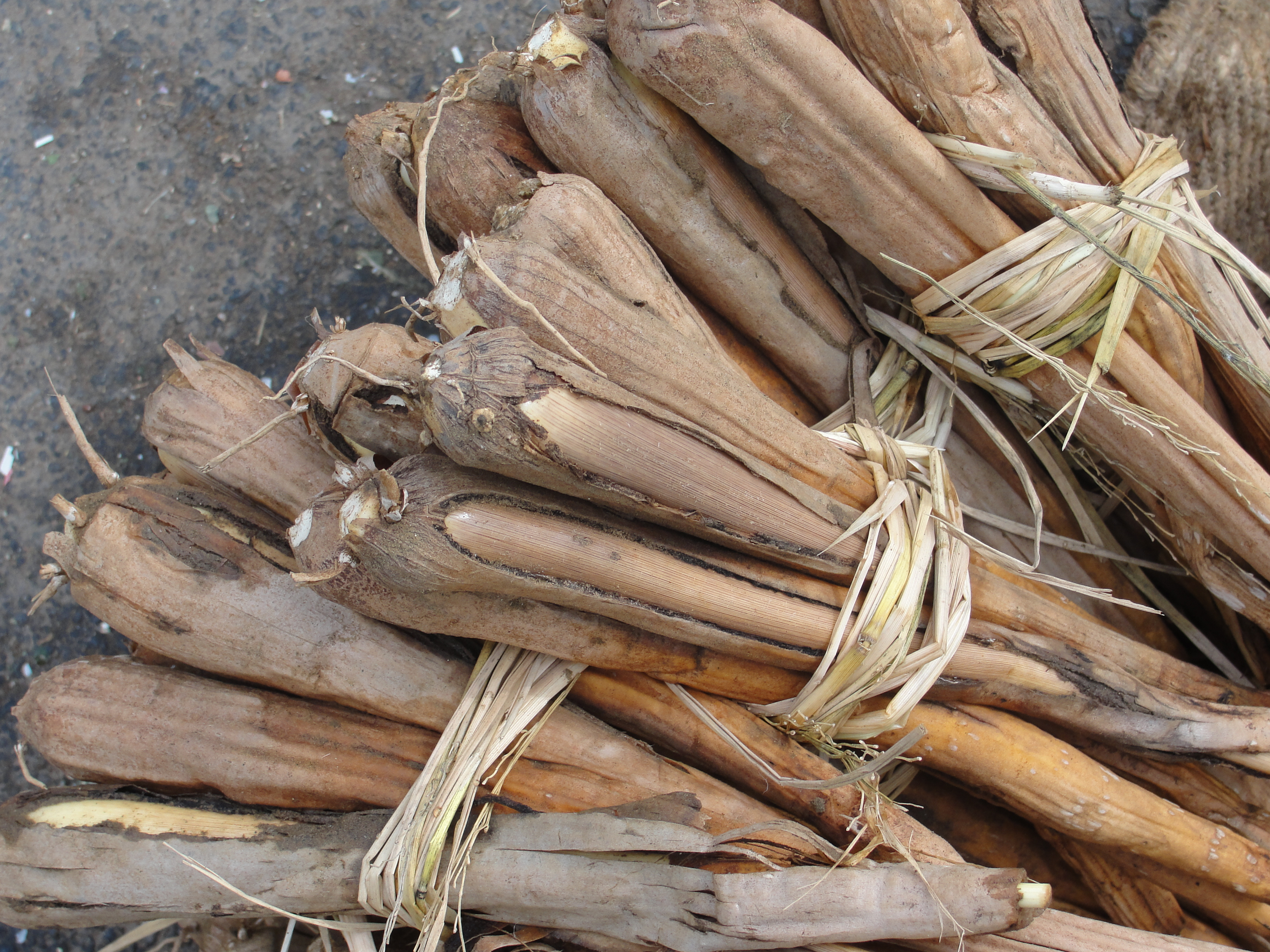
Palmyra sprout in bunches

Palmyra sprout (also known as Palmyra tuber) is an underground sprout of the Palmyra palm or Borassus flabellifer. It can be dried or boiled to form Odiyal, a hard chewable snack.

It is used as an offering in Lakshmi Puja in various parts of Bengal and is also eaten raw.

== Summary ==
Palmyra sprouts are cultivated in the states of Tamil Nadu, Bihar, Telangana and Andhra Pradesh, India, and in Northern Province, Sri Lanka. In Tamilnadu, they are most common in Tirunelveli, Tenkasi, Tuticorin, Ramanathapuram, Vellore, Tiruvannamalai and Villupuram Districts. The seeds are planted and once they germinate the fleshy stems are harvested from below the surface. They are boiled or roasted and eaten. They are very fibrous and nutritious.

They are known as Panai Kizhangu or Panamkizhangu (பனம் கிழங்கு) in Tamil and Thegalu (తేగలు), Gẽgulu (గేఁగులు), or Gengulu (గెంగులు) in Telugu.

== See also ==
- Heart of palm
- Bamboo shoot
