= Coquito nuts =

Chilean nuts

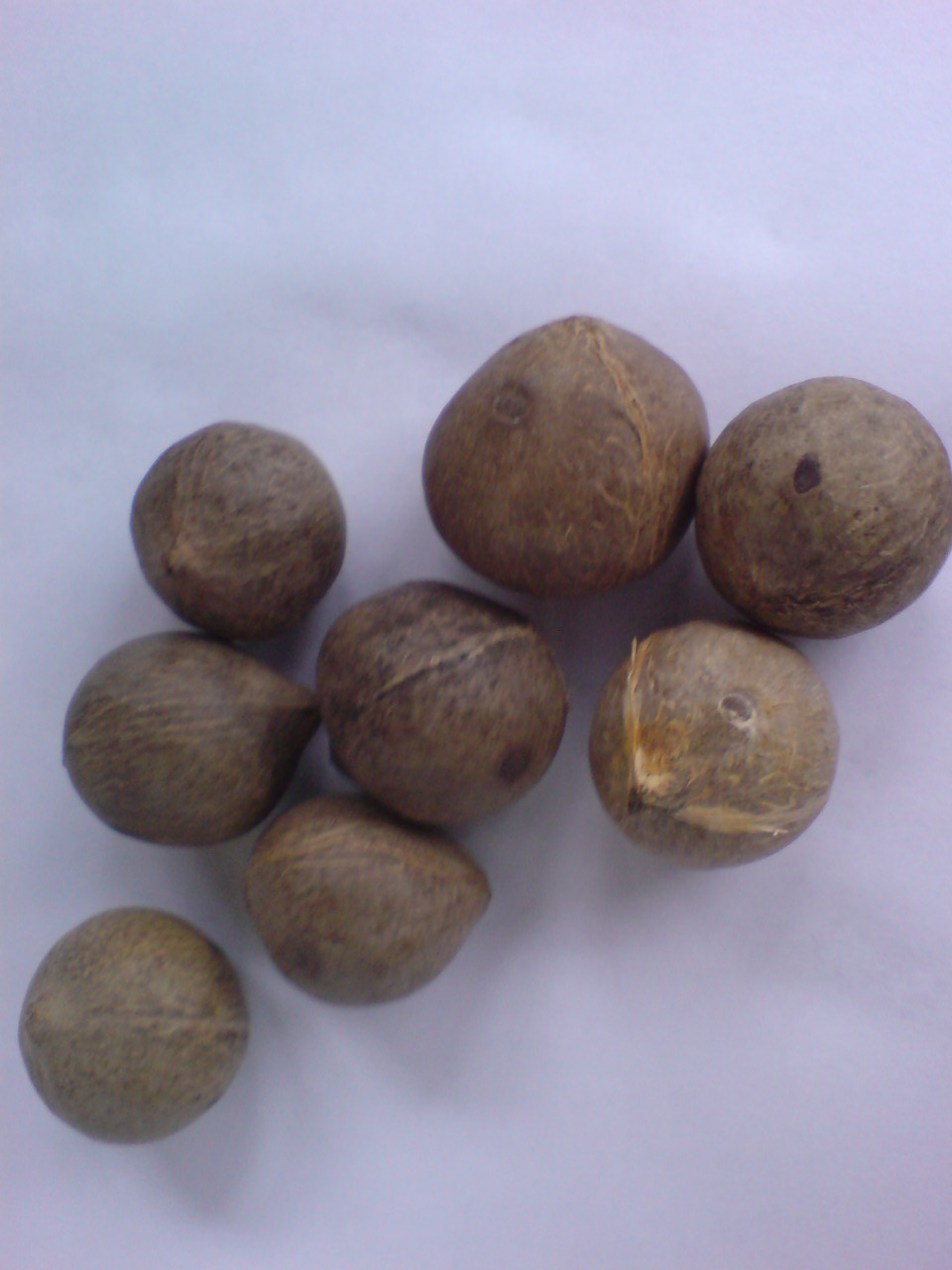
Coquito nuts

Coquito nuts are the fruits from a feather-leaved palm, Jubaea chilensis, native to Chile, having a thick trunk from which is obtained a sugary sap used for making wine and a syrup, and widely cultivated as an ornamental in warm dry regions. (Spanish, diminutive of coco, "coco palm", from Portuguese côco; see coconut.) Coquito nuts look like miniature coconuts and have a very similar flavor to coconuts. They have a brown exterior and a white interior with a hollow center. They measure about 1/2 to 3/4 inch (1.3 to 1.9 cm) in diameter. They are completely edible (raw or cooked), and are crunchy, with an almond-like sweetness.

== History ==
Coquito nuts, also referred to as coker nuts, pygmy coconuts or monkey's coconuts, are the fruit of a Chilean palm tree. The tree, Jubaea chilensis, takes up to fifty years to achieve maturity, and is native to the coastal valleys of Chile. This palm is grown in Mediterranean-type climates worldwide, including in the state of California.

== Usage ==
Coquito nuts can be eaten whole, raw or cooked. Whole or chopped coquito nuts can be added to a variety of foods, including desserts, savoury foods, and drinks. They are grown year round, and will stay edible for up to three weeks if kept in a refrigerator.

== Nutritional information ==
Below is a table of nutrients contained with 1 serving (g) of coquito nuts, based on a 2000 calorie diet.

Nutrients	Amount	Pct daily value
Total calories	110 (90 cals from fat)	-
Total fat	10 grams	15%
Saturated fat	9 grams	45%
Sodium	5 milligrams	0%
Carbohydrates	5 grams	2%
Dietary fibre	3 grams	12%
Sugars	1 gram	0%
Vitamin A	-	0%
Vitamin C	-	0%
Calcium	-	0%
Iron	-	4%
