= Borassus flabellifer =

Scientific classification
- Kingdom: Plantae
- Clade: Tracheophytes
- Clade: Angiosperms
- Clade: Monocots
- Clade: Commelinids
- Order: Arecales
- Family: Arecaceae
- Genus: Borassus
- Species: B. flabellifer

Binomial name
- Borassus flabellifer L.

Synonyms
- Borassus flabelliformis L.; Borassus flabelliformis Roxb.; Borassus sundaicus Becc.; Borassus tunicatus Lour.; Lontarus domestica Gaertn. nom. illeg.; Pholidocarpus tunicatus (Lour.) H.Wendl.; Thrinax tunicata (Lour.) Rollisson

Species of flowering plant

Borassus flabellifer, also known as palmyra palm, (Note: Other common names include doub palm, fan palm, ice apple, lontal palm, ron palm, sea apple, sugar palm, tala palm, toddy palm, and wine palm.) is a fan palm native to tropical and sub-tropical regions of South Asia and Southeast Asia. It is a tall, sturdy tree growing up to 20–30 m (66–98 ft), with large fan-shaped leaves arranged in the form of a crown. It produces a pale white and branched inflorescence consisting of clusters of flowers. It produces bunches of large fruits containing sweet, watery kernels.

It grows in a wide range of habitats and is drought resistant to an extent. It takes a few years to mature and can have a productive life of 100+ years. Most of the parts of the tree including its fruit, sap, leaves, and trunk, find extensive applications. The fruits and sprouts are edible, while the sap is used to make palm wine, sugar, jaggery, and palm candy. The leaves and fibres are used for thatching, weaving, and handicrafts. The strong trunk is used for construction and furniture. Because of its extensive uses, the tree forms a major part of the native culture across the region.

== Taxonomy ==
The species name flabellifer is derived from Latin meaning "fan-bearing". The genus name Borassus comes from the Greek word "borassos" meaning "an immature spadix of date palm" as the immature inflorescence of the palmyra palm resembles that of the date palm. It was first described as Borassus flabelliformis in the thirteenth edition of Carl Linnaeus's Systema Naturae published by Johan Andreas Murray in 1774. It was later described as Lontarus domestica Joseph Gaertner in 1788 and Borassus tunicatus by João de Loureiro in 1790. It was classified as Lontarus flabellifer by François Joseph Lestiboudois in 1800. Other heterogenous synonyms include Thrinax tunicata by William Rollisson in 1875, Pholidocarpus tunicatus by Hermann Wendland in 1878, and Borassus sundaicus by Odoardo Beccari in 1914.

== Description ==
Palmyra palm is a solitary and robust tree that can reach up to 20–30 m (66–98 ft). It has a hard and greyish colored trunk measuring 25–30 cm (9.8–11.8 in) in diameter and consisting of several consecutive rings made up of dried leaf bases. It has 40-50 large fan-shaped fronds arranged in the form of a crown measuring up to 3 m (9.8 ft) across. The tree has greyish-green leaves, which are large and thick. They have semi-terete and spiny petioles measuring 1.5–2 m (4 ft 11 in – 6 ft 7 in) in length. The induplicately arranged leaves measure 1.2–1.8 m (3 ft 11 in – 5 ft 11 in) across, and consist of 60 to 65 folded segments. The lower part of the foliage often consists of marcescent leaves.

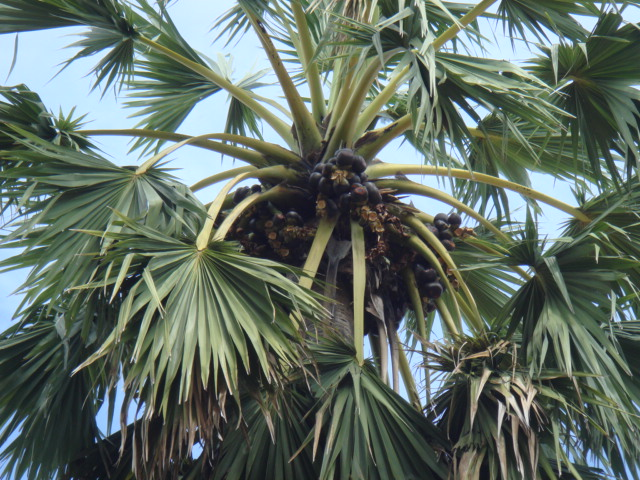
Foliage with fruits

Palmyra palm is dioecious and the tree produces a pale white inflorescence attached close to the leaf stems. The branched inflorescence consists of clusters of flowers. The trees look identical until flowering, which happens before the summer. Rarely male and female flowers have been recorded in the same trees. The male inflorescence is branched and attached with a 50–60 m (160–200 ft) long peduncle. It has a 40–50 cm (16–20 in) long rachis consisting of 5 to 7 first order branches each of which bears 2 to 3 spikelets that are 35–50 cm (14–20 in) long. The female inflorescence is rarely branched, and has a smaller 40–50 m (130–160 ft) long peduncle, covered by a sheath.

The fully open male flowers measure 0.5–0.7 cm (0.20–0.28 in) in length and 2 cm (0.79 in) in diameter. The female flowers are larger, measuring 2.8–3.2 cm (1.1–1.3 in) in length and 2.5 cm (0.98 in) in diameter. The female flowers mature into clusters of ovoid fruits. Each fruit measures 15–20 cm (5.9–7.9 in) in diameter and weighs 1.5–2.5 kg (3.3–5.5 lb). The fruits are bluish while young and become black to brown at maturity. The calyx, consisting of three to four sepals, remain tightly attached to the fruits. The fleshy and fibrous endocarp consists of one to three seeds. The seeds of young fruits contain semi-solid, white kernels, which contain a watery, sweet juice. A mature tree produces 200 to 300 fruits in a year.

== Distribution and habitat ==
Palmyra palm is native to tropical and sub-tropical regions of South Asia and Southeast Asia. It has since been introduced to Africa, China, and other parts of the world. It grows in a variety of habitats from dry areas to coastal sandy soils. It is generally grown along the edges of rice fields and borders of human settlements. It is drought resistant but grows well in well-drained soils with some shade. The tree is difficult to transplant once it germinates because of its deeper roots and hence seeds are sown in the final intended positions.

== Lifespan ==
Palmyra seedlings grow slowly after germination, producing only a few leaves each year (establishment phase), but at an as yet undetermined time, they grow rapidly, producing a substantial stem and foliage. It normally takes about 12 to 20 years for the tree to mature. A fully grown tree has a productive lifespan of 100+ years.

== Uses ==
Various parts of the palmyra palm tree has found extensive usage since pre-historical period. Greek traveller Megasthenes, who visited India during Chandragupta Maurya's rule in the 4th century BCE, describes jaggery made from palm sap. In a Tamil poem titled Tala Vilasam, the tree is referred to as "tree of life" and about 801 different uses of its parts have been described. Because of its height and appearance, it is used as a natural shield against winds and grown as an ornamental plant.

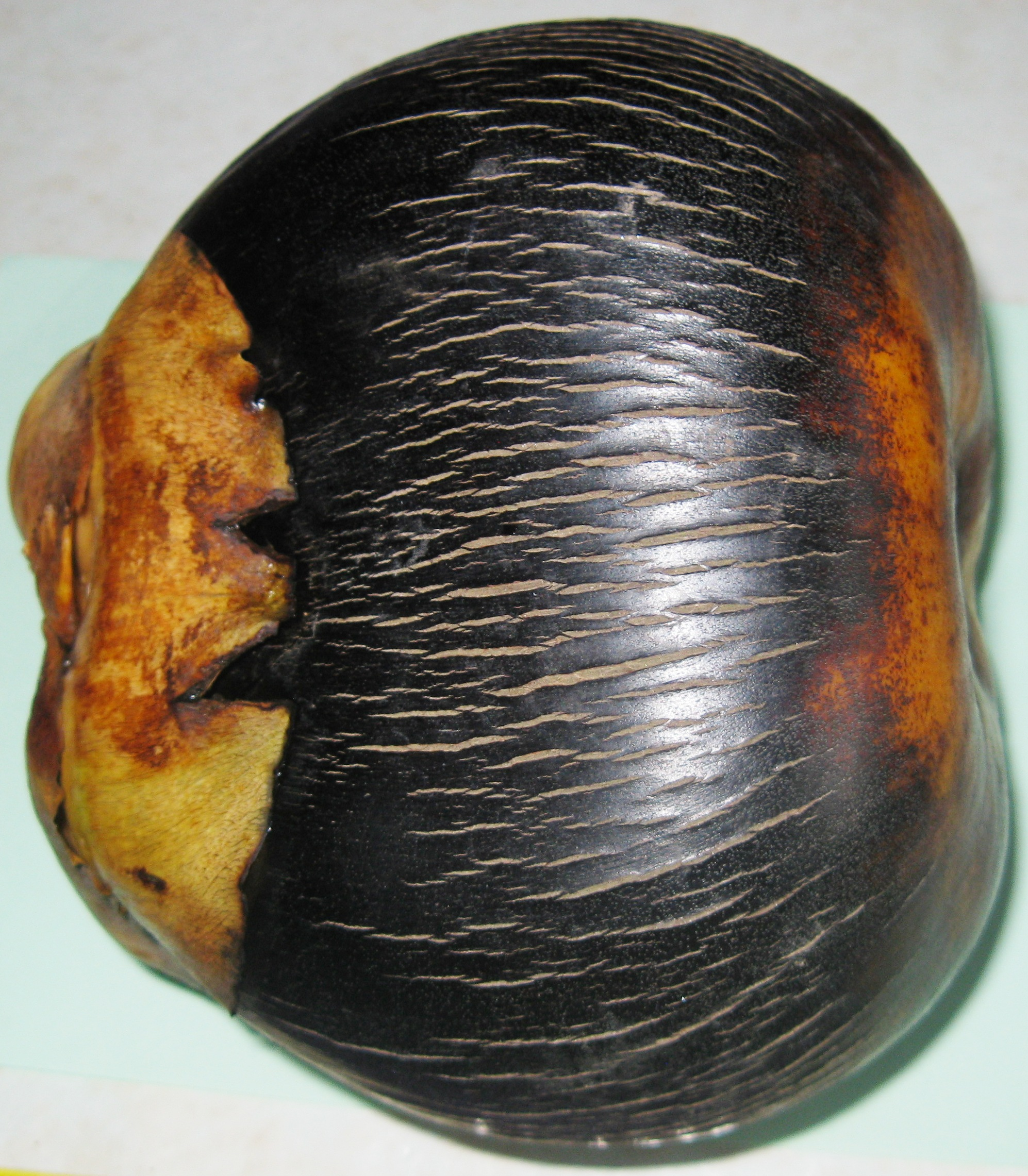
Palmyra fruit and extracted kernels

=== Fruit ===
The fruit contains several polysaccharides, major of which is galactomannan. It has 3.21% glucose, 1.46% fructose, and 0.38% sucrose. The fruit is rich in vitamins A and C, and considered to have antioxidant and anti-inflammatory properties. It can be eaten raw or used as an ingredient in various dishes. It is used as a substitute for water in the tropical countries. Because of its jelly-like nature, it can also be pickled, or made into jam, dessert, or candies. The fruit is used as treatment for dermatitis in folk medicine.

=== Inflorescence ===
Tapping the sap from the inflorescence

A sugary sap can be obtained from the young inflorescence, either male or female. The sap is usually collected manually, with workers climbing the tree to obtain them. The young shoots are bound together and tapped to collect the dripping juice in earthenware pots or containers. As the sap ferments quickly, the shoots or containers are coated with lime to avoid fermentation. The tappers regularly collect the sap and shave off the tip of the shoots to make the sap flow continuously. One gram per 100 cm^{3} of palm sap has a specific gravity of 1.07 and a pH range of 6.7 to 6.9. It consists of 10.93 grams of sugar, 0.35 grams of protein, 13.9 IU of Vitamin B, and trace amounts of calcium, iron, and nitrogen. The sap contains five to six percent alcohol and can be consumed raw. It can be fermented into a palm wine, known as toddy.

The sap can be used to make sugar or boiled to make jaggery. One gram per 100 cm^{3} of palmyra sugar consists of 98.89% carbohydrates, 0.37% lipids, 0.24% proteins, and trace amount of minerals such as calcium, iron, and nicotinic acid, and 398 calories. One gram per 100 cm^{3} of palmyra jaggery consists of 76.86% carbohydrates, 0.19% lipids, 1.04% proteins, and trace amount of minerals such as calcium, phosphorus, iron, and copper. It is broadly used in South Asian and South East Asian cuisine. These often serve as sugar substitutes and as a source of carbohydrates. The extracted unfermented sap is boiled, strained, and poured into earthen pots, where it is left undisturbed for several months to allow sugar crystals to slowly form to form palm candy, which has a hard, crystalline structure.

The flower buds and stalks are used as a diuretic. The sap has various medicinal uses and is used as a laxative, stimulant, anti-phlegmatic, and amoebicide. It is also used to treat skin ulcers and as a disinfectant to treat wounds. The palm sugar is used for the treatment of liver disorders and an antidote to certain poisons. The jaggery is used as a remedy for cough and lung related ailments.

=== Leaves ===
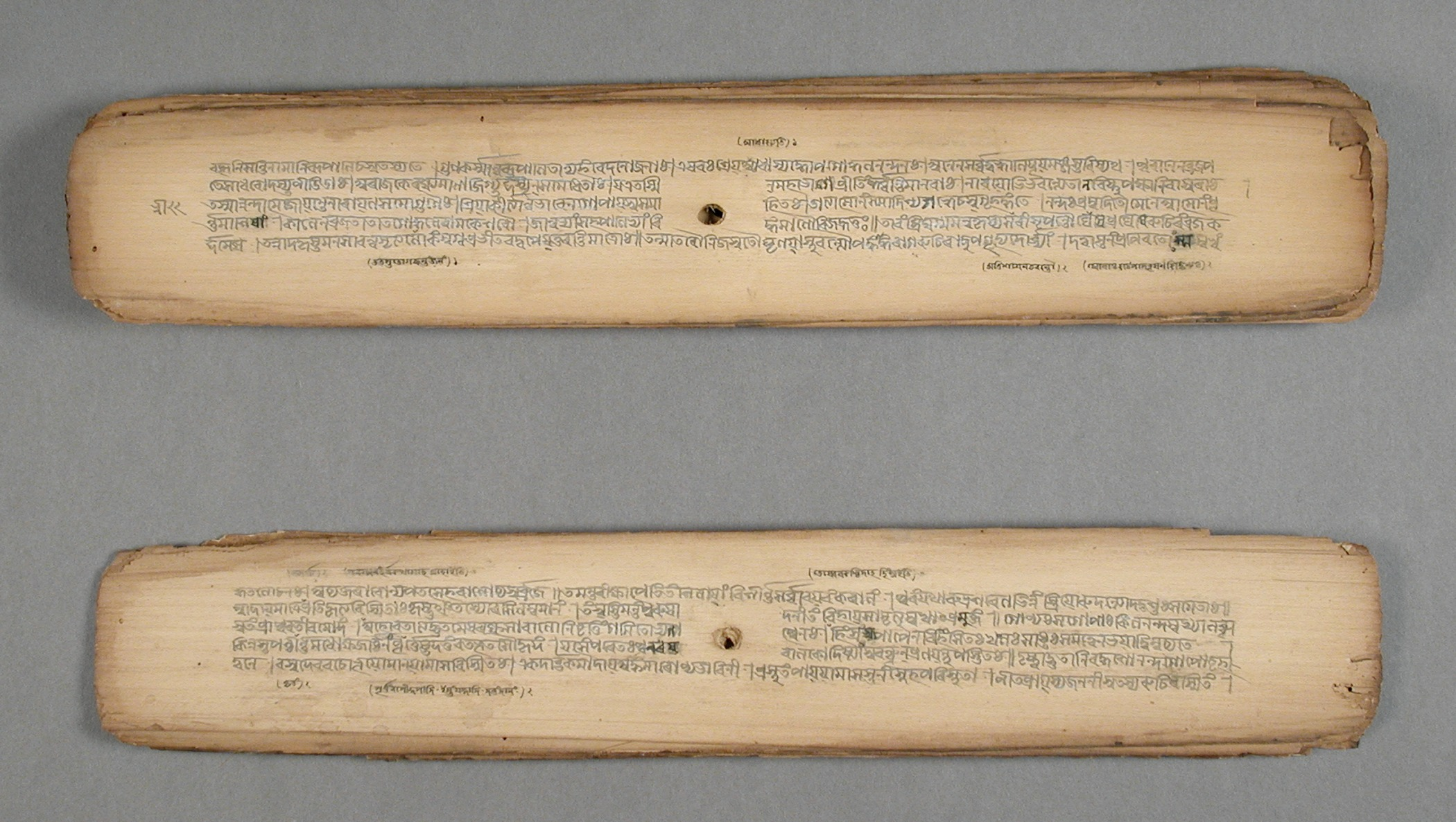
Palm-leaf manuscript

The leaves and fibres are used extensively in various applications. Before paper came to usage, palm leaves were used as a writing material. Palm leaves were used for writing in the Indian subcontinent as early as the 5th century BCE. These were known as "lontar" in Indonesia. While the palmyra palm leaves are thick, they are also brittle. Hence, they are prepared by drying and polishing. They are often coated with essential oils or plant juices to make them sturdy and as an insecticide. They are cut into smaller strips, often measuring 48 cm (19 in) in length and 4 cm (1.6 in) in width, and several leaves are bundled together and tied by a thread through two holes pierced on either side of the leaves. Either metal implements were used to inscribe the text or ink was used along with a brush.

The palmyra leaves are used in weaving and handicrafts to make mats, baskets, umbrellas, fans, and other materials. It is also used in thatching of roofs and for constructing fences. The dried leaves are used as a fuel, and as manure and fodder for cattle. The palmyra palm yields five types of fibers of which three are extracted from leaves and its associated parts. The fibers are water resistant and impervious to certain chemicals, and find extensive applications. They are used to make brushes, brooms, and for weaving into ropes.

=== Sprouts ===
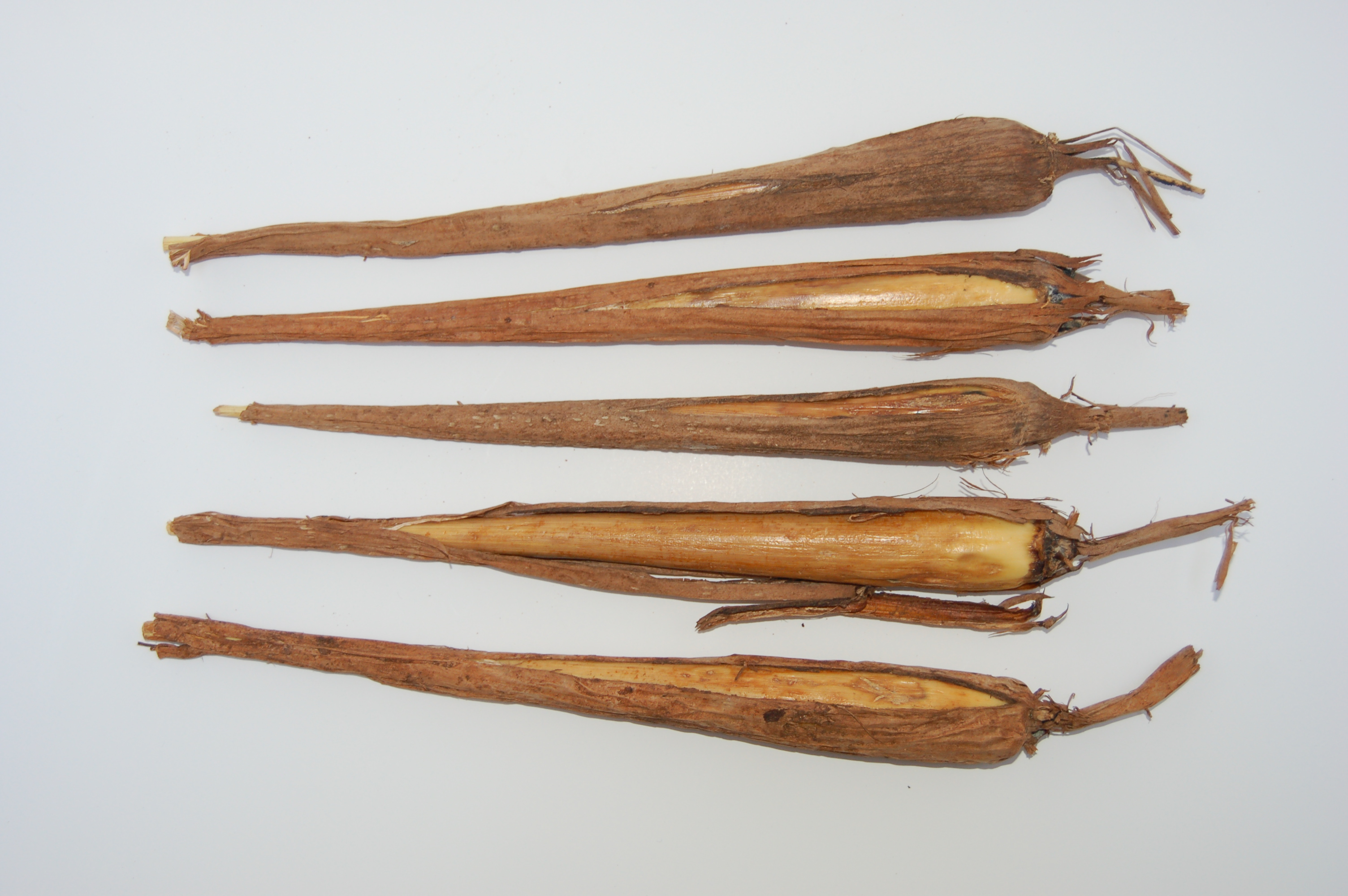
Palmyra sprout

Palmyra sprouts are tubers that are obtained when the palymra seed is germinated. Per 100 grams, these sprouts contain 8.5 grams of proteins, 7.3 grams of dietary fiber, and 118.4 calories. It can be consumed raw or boiled and roasted. It is used as an ingredient, similar to other tuber vegetables, in Indian cuisine. It is also dried and powdered to make flour, and cooked into sweets and desserts. The roots are dried and smoked and used as a folk remedy for nasal complaints. The fruit yields a type of fiber, and studies have indicated that the fruit shell extract inhibits corrosion of steel, which can have industrial applications.

=== Trunk ===
The hard trunk is used as a construction material. It is also used to make furniture, and other wooden implements such as sticks and handles for canes. It is used for making pedestrial bridges. It is also used as firewood and can be burned to make charcoal.

== Culture and symbolism ==
In the Hindu epic Mahabharata, the palmyra tree is depicted as part of the ensign of Balarama and Bhishma. Panaiveriyamman (named after panai, the Tamil name for the tree), also known as Taalavaasini, is an ancient tree deity related to fertility.

The palmyra tree is a national symbol of Cambodia. It is designated as the official state tree of the Indian state of Tamil Nadu, and a symbol of the Indonesian province of South Sulawesi. The tree features prominently on the official emblem of the Northern Province of Sri Lanka, denoted as a symbol of strength and the traditional livelihood of the people. The trees are considered a symbol of Anyar, the dry zone of Myanmar. The palmyra frond is part of the logo of Dewan Bahasa dan Pustaka, Malaysia's language regulatory board.

Talgach is a popular Bengali poem by Rabindranath Tagore. Thai poet Sunthorn Phu mentions the tree in his poems.
