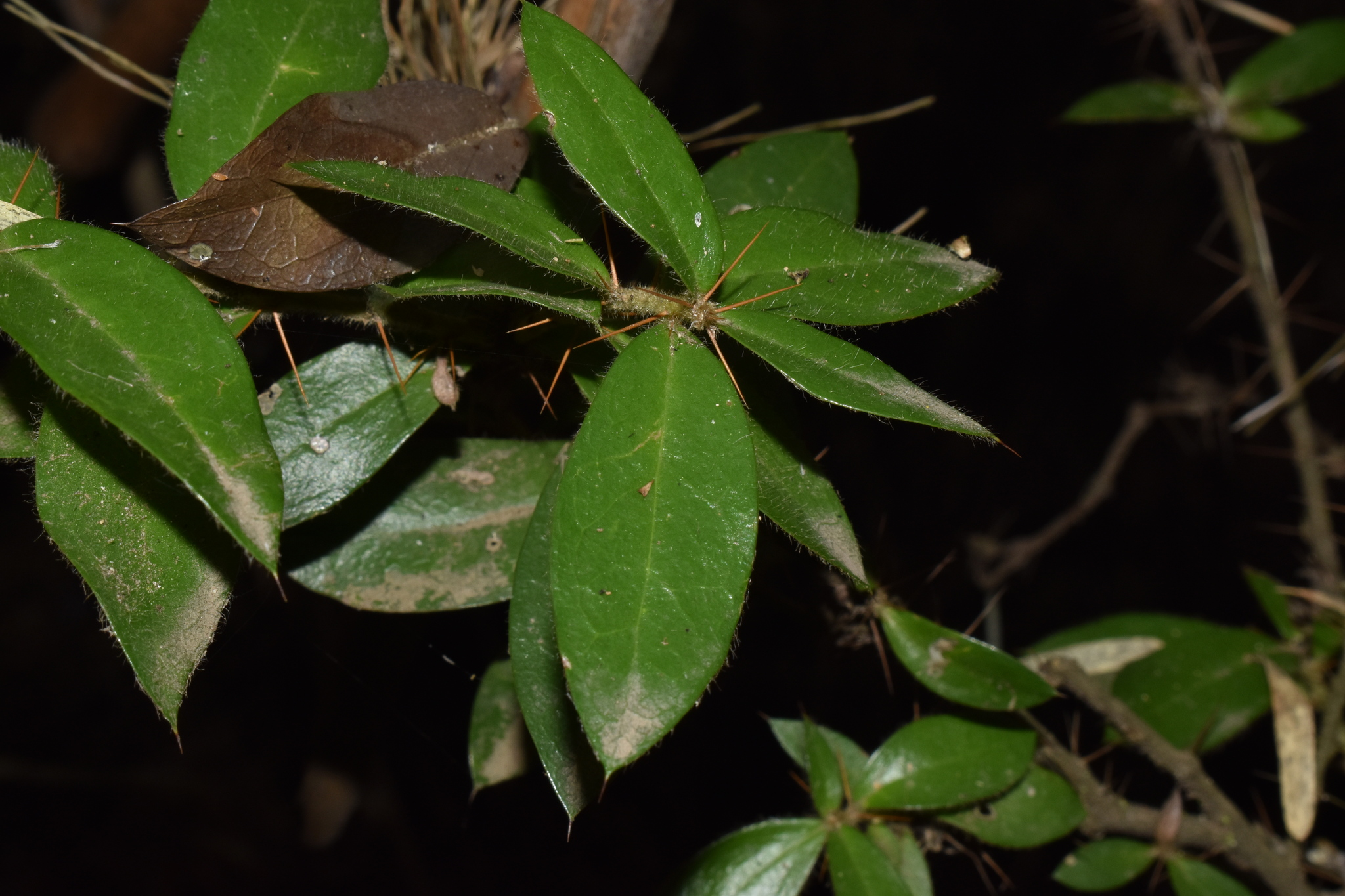

Scientific classification
- Kingdom: Plantae
- Clade: Tracheophytes
- Clade: Angiosperms
- Clade: Eudicots
- Clade: Asterids
- Order: Asterales
- Family: Asteraceae
- Genus: Dasyphyllum
- Species: D. excelsum

Binomial name
- Dasyphyllum excelsum (D.Don) Cabrera

= Dasyphyllum excelsum =

Species of plant

Dasyphyllum excelsum (known as bulli in Chile) is a species of flowering plant in the family Asteraceae. This species is endemic to Chile, occurring from Quillota to Cauquenes (32 to 35°S) between 190 and 800 m above sea level, a specific location of occurrence being in central Chile within the Cerro La Campana forests in association with the endangered Chilean wine palm, Jubaea chilensis.

Plants of the World Online assigns the name Archidasyphyllum excelsum for this species.

== Description ==
It is an evergreen tree that measures up to 15 m (50 ft) tall and over 2 m (80 in) in diameter, soft, thin and brown bark, with deep vertical cracks, it is one of the few genera of asteraceae which are trees. The leaves are alternate, entire edge, elliptical shaped with acute apex which ends in a mucro. The leaves are yellowish green, 2-6 long and 1–2.5 cm wide, glabrous on both surfaces and pubescent on the margins, the petioles are 1–4 mm long.

Provided with two thorns (modified stipules), deciduous at the base of the leaves, the flowers are clustered in inflorescences (terminal Flower heads). The flowers are white and hermaphrodite, 5 stamens with the anthers attached. The fruit is a cylindrical achene about 3–3.5 mm long and 1 mm wide, pubescent, reddish pappi 5 mm long.

== Etymology ==
Dasyphyllum is derived from Greek hairy leaves, excelsum from Latin meaning akin to tall or prominent.
