= Sishu Bholanath =

Book of poems by Rabindranath Tagore

Sishu Bholanath (Bengali: শিশু ভোলানাথ; English: 'The Child Bholanath') is a Bengali book of poems written by Rabindranath Tagore. It was published in 1922. It consists of 27 poems. It is a famous work of Tagore for the children.

== Theme ==
The desire, imagination and courage of child is the main theme of the book. The poems are rhythmic and enriched with the thoughts of greatness. Most of the poems are written addressing a silent mother. The natural object is also an integral part of the book.

== List of poems ==
The poems of "Sishu Bholanath" are:

- Sishu bholanath
- Buri
- Mone para
- Sat samudra pare
- Pathhara
- Dur
- Ichhamati
- Rajmishtri
- Martabasi
- Sishur jibon
- Robibar
- Putul bhanga
- Jyotishi
- Sanshajee
- Baul
- Anyo maa
- Ghumer tatva
- Bani-binimoy
- Talgach
- Somoyhara
- Murkhu
- Khela-bhola
- Raja o rani
- Dustu
- Duyorani
- Dui ami
- Bristi roudra
- bad boy
