= Borassus =

- Borassus flabellifer in Tamil Nadu

Scientific classification
- Kingdom: Plantae
- Clade: Tracheophytes
- Clade: Angiosperms
- Clade: Monocots
- Clade: Commelinids
- Order: Arecales
- Family: Arecaceae
- Subfamily: Coryphoideae
- Tribe: Borasseae
- Genus: Borassus; L.

Type species
- Borassus flabellifer L.

Species
- See text

Synonyms
- Lontarus Adans.

Genus of palms

Borassus (palmyra palm) is a genus of five species of fan palms, native to tropical regions of Africa, Asia, and Papua New Guinea.

== Description ==
These massive palms can grow up to 30 m (98 ft) high and have robust trunks with distinct leaf scars; in some species, the trunk develops a distinct swelling just below the crown, though for unknown reasons.

The leaves are fan-shaped, 2–3 m (6 ft 7 in – 9 ft 10 in) long, with spines along the petiole margins (no spines in B. heineanus). The leaf sheath has a distinct cleft at its base, through which the inflorescences appear; old leaf sheaths are retained on the trunk, but fall away with time.

All Borassus palms are dioecious, with male and female flowers on separate plants; male flowers are less than 10 mm (0.39 in) long and in semicircular clusters, sandwiched between leathery bracts in pendulous catkins; female flowers are 30–50 mm (1.2–2.0 in) wide, globe-shaped and solitary, sitting directly on the surface of the inflorescence axis.

The fruits are 150–250 mm (5.9–9.8 in) wide and roughly spherical, and each contains one to three large seeds. Depending on the species, fruit colour varies from black to brown, yellow, or orange; the fibrous pulp is aromatic and sweet to taste. Each seed is enclosed in a woody endocarp, which protects it when the fruit is consumed by elephants, monkeys, and other frugivores. At germination, the young seedling extends downwards into the soil and only a few leaves are visible above ground; this provides some protection against frequent fires in its savanna habitat; after an indeterminate number of years (the establishment phase), the seedling forms a stem and quickly grows above the savanna vegetation, where it is then less vulnerable to fire.

== Species ==
| Image | Fruits | Common name | Scientific name | Native distribution |
|---|---|---|---|---|
| | | African palmyra palm, Rônier (and other names) | Borassus aethiopum | tropical Africa and Madagascar |
| | | Ake Assi's palmyra palm, Rônier (and other names) | Borassus akeassii | West and Central Africa |
| | | Asian palmyra palm/lontar palm/doub palm | Borassus flabellifer | southern Asia from India to Indonesia |
| | | Papua New Guinea palmyra palm | Borassus heineanus | Papua New Guinea |
| | | Madagascar palmyra palm | Borassus madagascariensis | Madagascar |

== Cultivation and uses ==
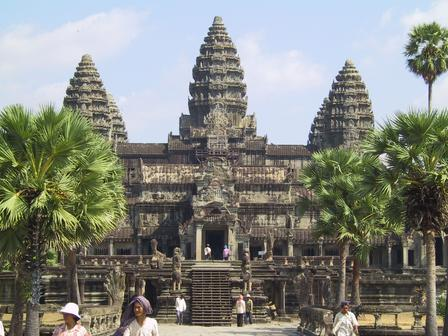
The main entrance of Angkor Wat to the temple proper, seen from the eastern end of the Nāga causeway and Asian palmyra palm

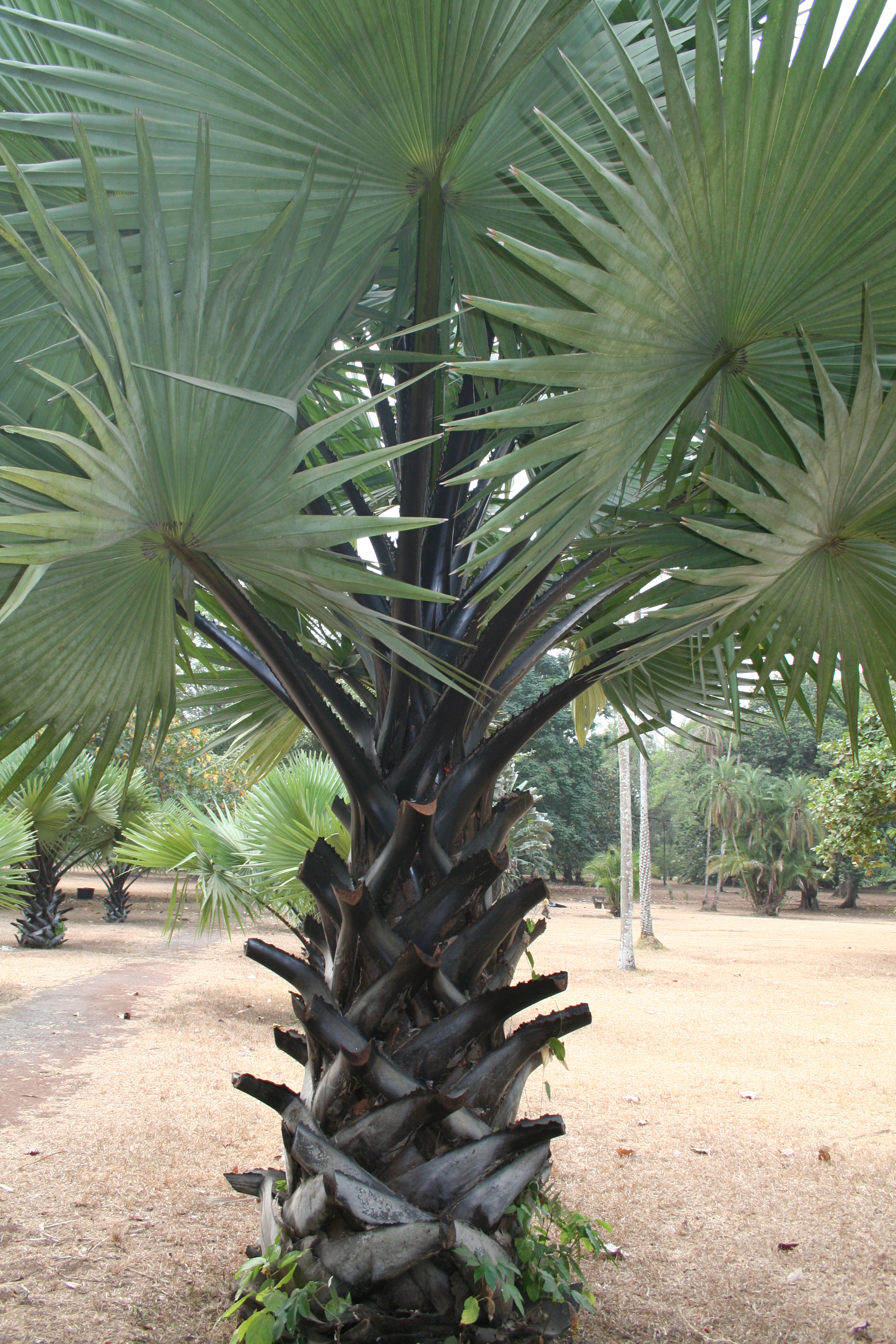
Young African palmyra palm (Borassus aethiopum)

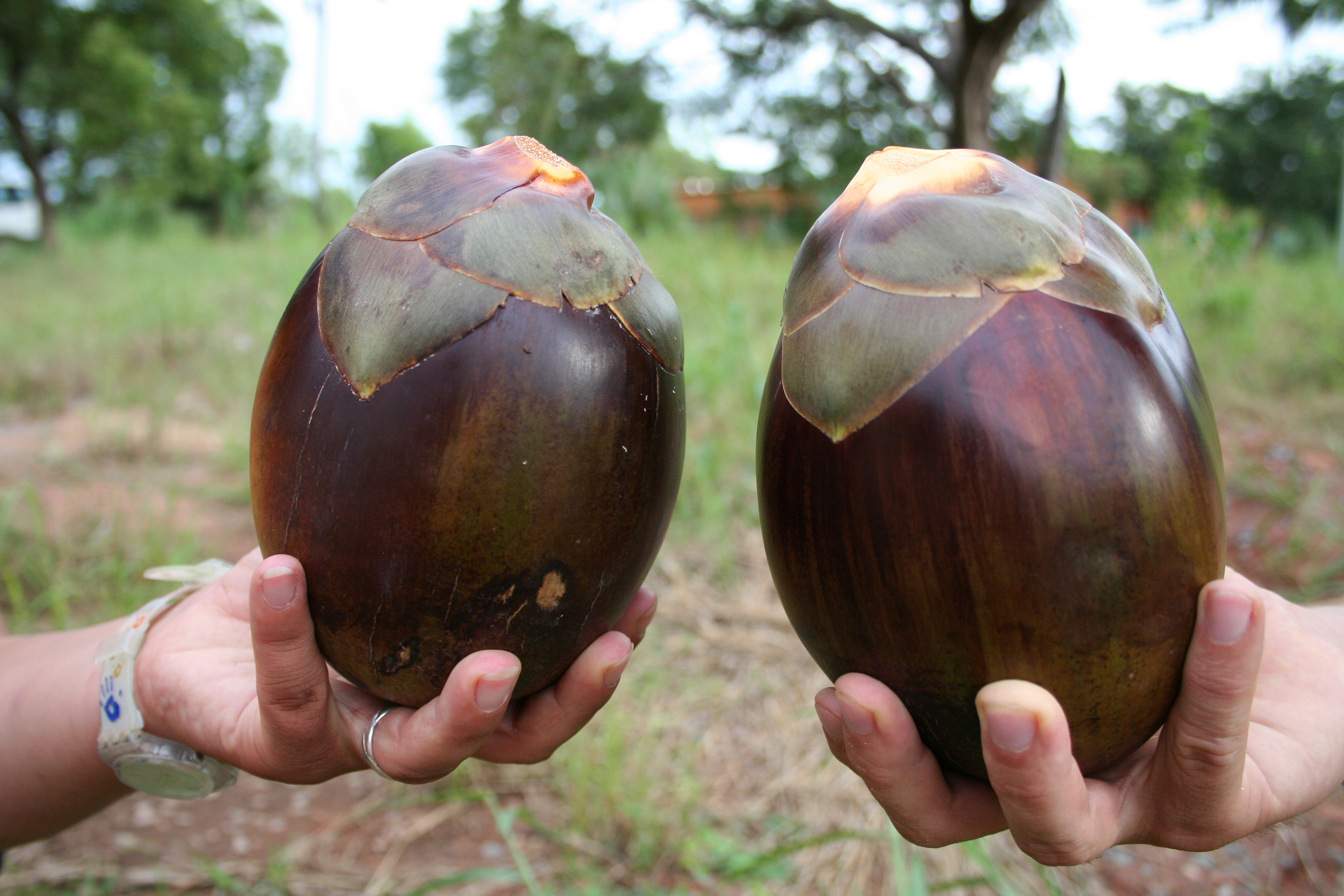
Ake Assi's palmyra palm (Borassus akeassii) fruit

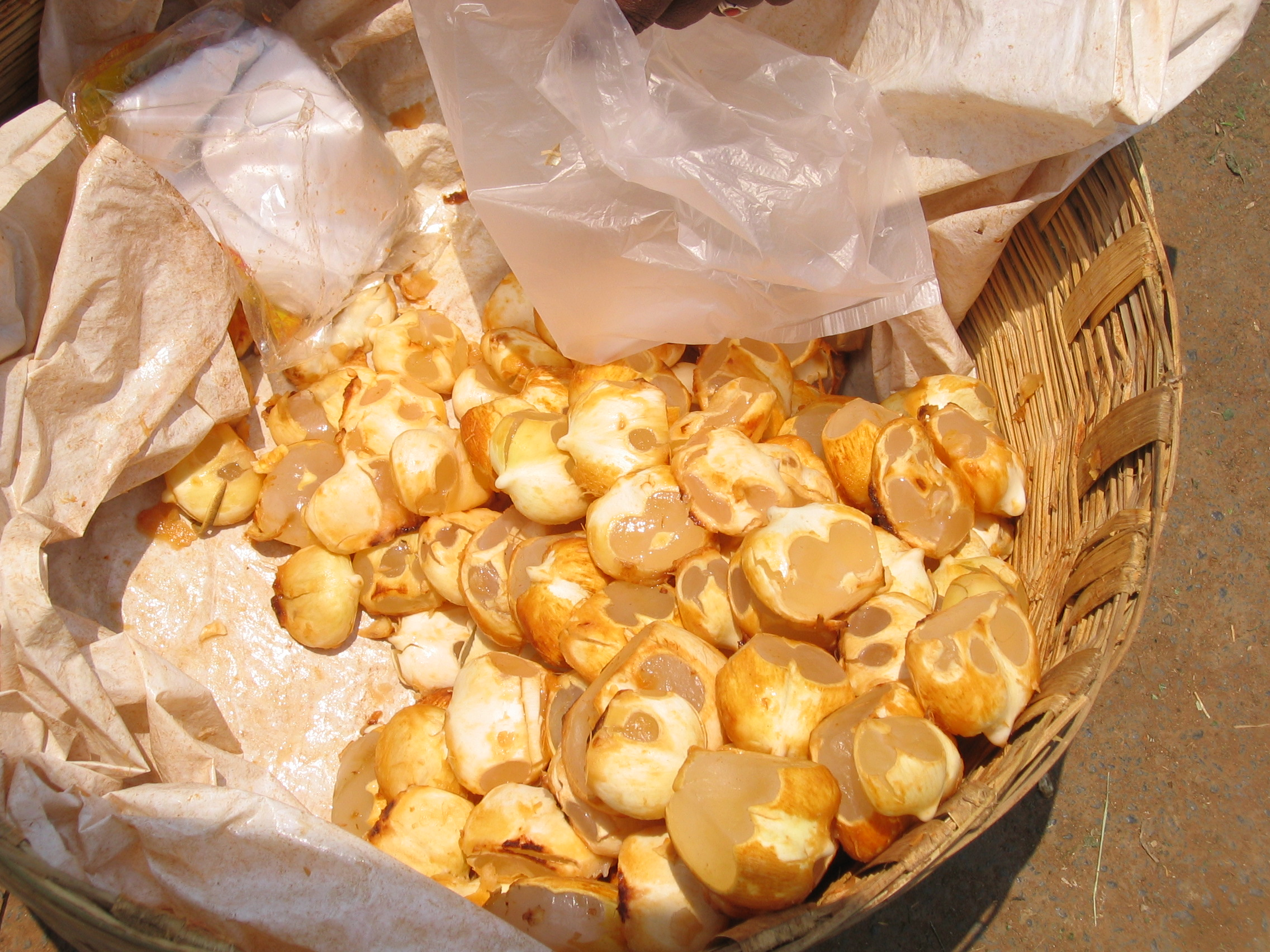
Jelly-like seeds of palmyra palm (Borassus flabellifer) fruit

Palmyra palms are economically useful and widely cultivated, especially in South Asia and Southeast Asia. The palmyra palm has long been one of the most important trees of Cambodia and India, where it has over 800 uses. The leaves are used for thatching, mats, baskets, fans, hats, and umbrellas, and as writing material.

In Sri Lanka, it is more common in the northern part of the country, where it has many uses including the production of jaggery from the syrup.

In Cambodia, the tree is a national floral symbol/emblem that is seen growing around Angkor Wat. Palmyra palms can live for over 100 years.

In ancient India, palmyra leaves were used as writing paper, with their parallel veins providing a useful rule. In India, mature leaves of suitable size, shape, and texture were chosen and preserved by boiling in salt water with turmeric powder. Once dry enough, the leaf surfaces were polished with pumice, cut to the proper size and a hole was cut in one corner. Each leaf has four pages and a stylus is used to write; the style is cursive and interconnected. Completed leaves are then tied up as sheaves.

The black timber is hard, heavy, and durable and highly valued for construction, especially in structures exposed to water, such as wharves, fences, and boats.

The tree yields many types of food. The young plants are cooked as a vegetable or roasted and pounded to make meal. The fruits are eaten roasted or raw, as are the young, jelly-like seeds. A sugary sap, called toddy, can be obtained from the young inflorescence, both male and female, and this is fermented to make a beverage called arrack, or concentrated to produce a crude sugar called jaggery/palm sugar. It is called gula Jawa (Javanese sugar) in Indonesia and is widely used in Javanese cuisine. The roots can be dried to form odiyal, a hard, chewable snack. In addition, the tree sap is taken as a laxative, and medicinal value has been ascribed to other parts of the plant.

=== In Tamil culture ===
The palmyra tree (பனை மரம்) is the official tree of Tamil Nadu; it is highly respected and used by the people. The leaf of the tree is used for fan making. It is also placed for roofs. The leaves are placed on top of a house. It is also used for baskets, mats, hats, and more. The fruit is eaten by many. The fruit is called nungu. This fruit is also used to make sweets. The wood is used for making beds, tables, chairs, cabinets and much more. In ancient times, this plant's bark was used to make pencils to write on banana leaves. The Sri Lankan government has created a separate Palmyra Development Board for the sectoral development and the Indian government has also funded for the research. The project is aimed at reviving the palmyra palm industry in Jaffna district, which has over 3.5 million trees.
