= Odiyal =

Snack made from palmyra palm tubers

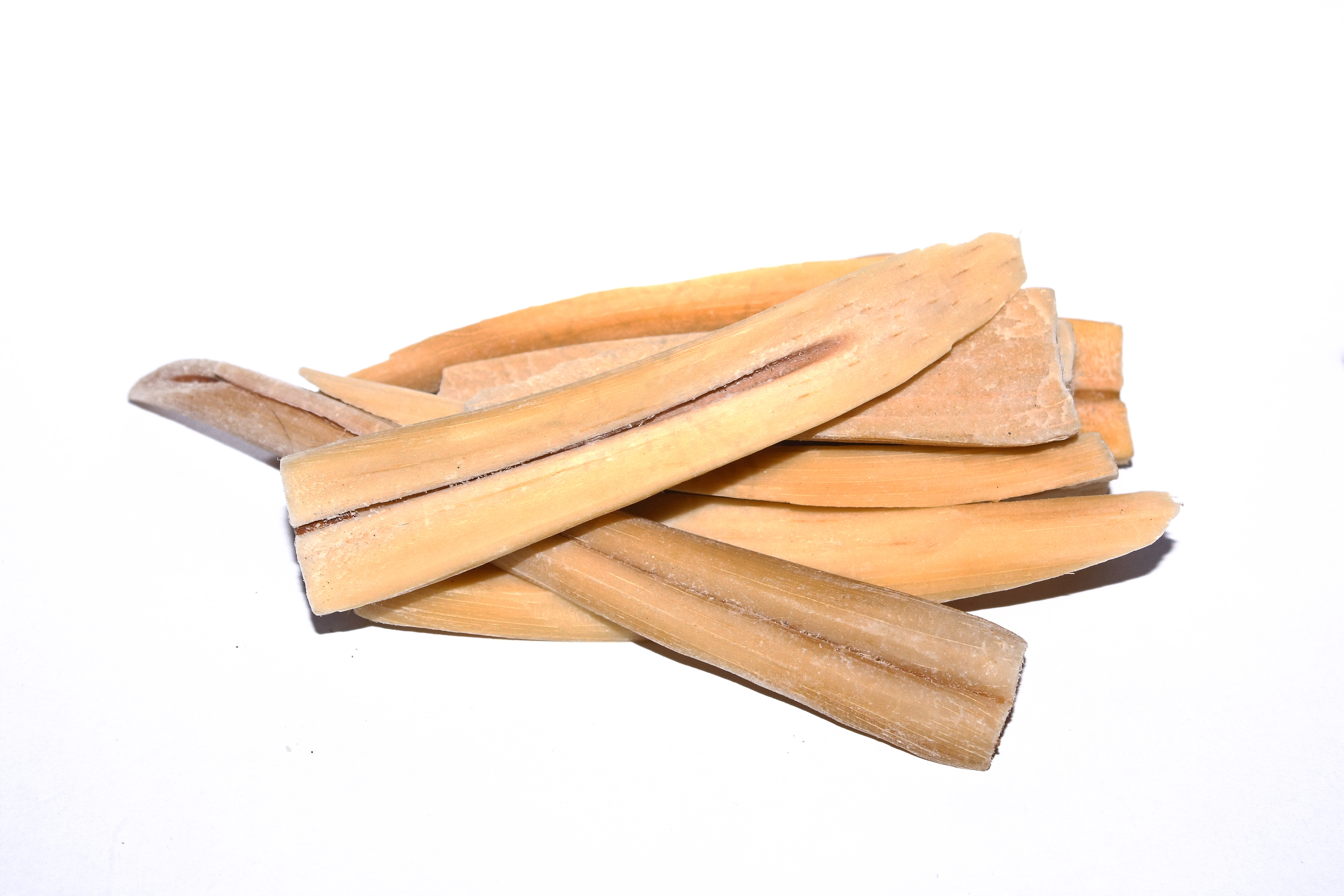
- Pulukodiyal, boiled palmyra tuber
- Course: Snack
- Place of origin: India, Sri Lanka
- Region or state: Tamil Nadu, Sri Lanka
- Main ingredients: Palmyra tuber
- Variations: Pulukodiyal, odiyal chip

Odiyal (Tamil: ஒடியல்) is a hard snack made from palmyra palm tubers (Palmyra sprouts). Generally, it is split in two and dried until it gets hard. Odiyal can be prepared in another form, called pulukodiyal. Pulukodiyal is prepared by boiling and then drying. It is used to produce Pulukodiyal flour.

Odiyal is a main ingredient for some food products such as odiyal flour, odiyal chips, odiyal pittu, odiyal kool, Palm posha, etc. It is a popular snack in the Jaffna Peninsula.

== Research ==
A study says that odiyal has carbohydrate, fibre, calcium, magnesium, iron, fat and protein in various levels. It has likely toxicity and it can be reduced by heating to 80 °C (176 °F) for 15 to 20 minutes.
