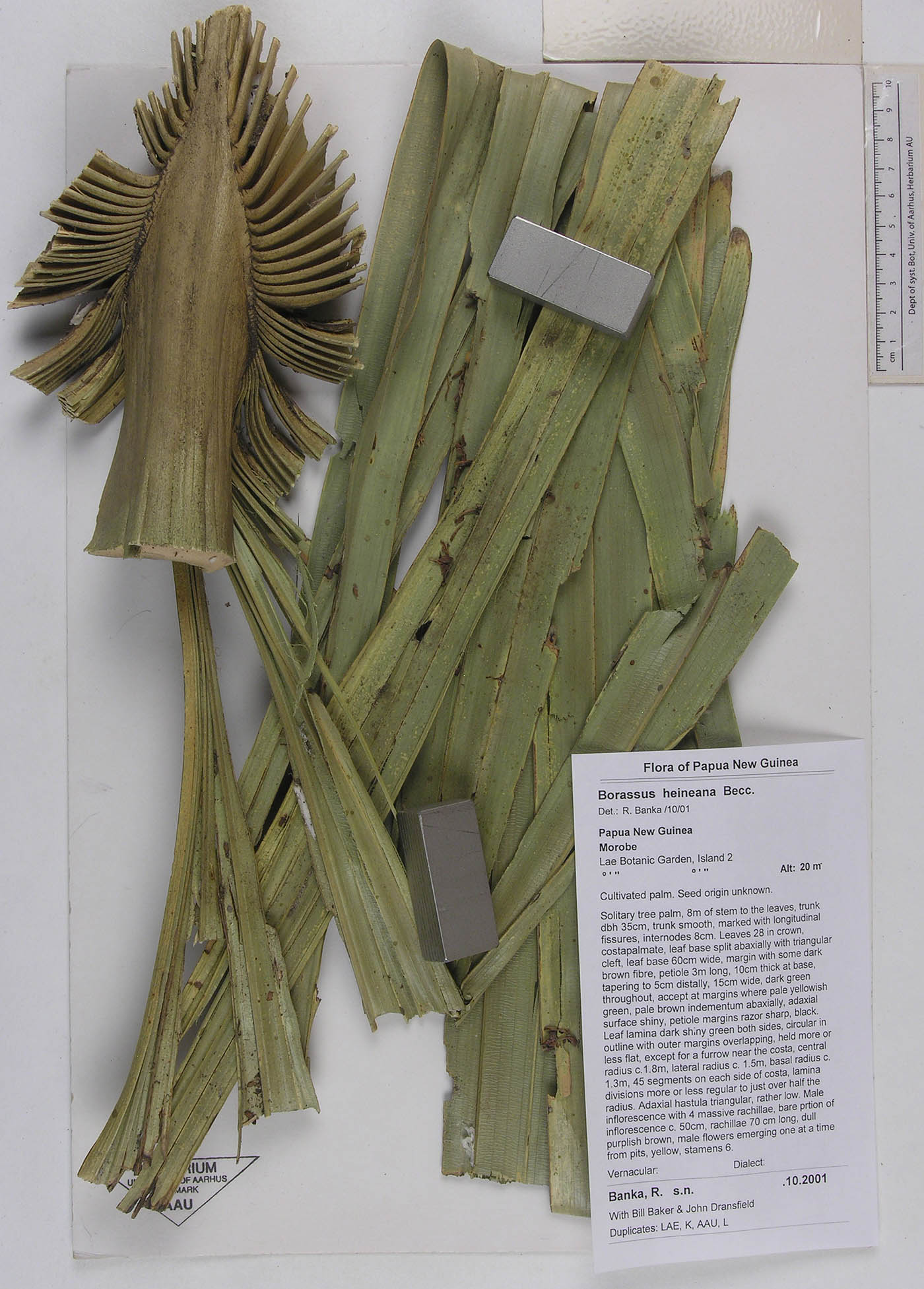
- Borassus heineanus, The herbarium collection

Scientific classification
- Kingdom: Plantae
- Clade: Tracheophytes
- Clade: Angiosperms
- Clade: Monocots
- Clade: Commelinids
- Order: Arecales
- Family: Arecaceae
- Genus: Borassus
- Species: B. heineanus

Binomial name
- Borassus heineanus Becc.

= Borassus heineanus =

New Guinea palmyra palm

Species of palm

Borassus heineanus is a species of a large solitary fan palm found only in northern New Guinea, in both Papua New Guinea and Indonesia, where it is threatened by habitat loss.

Also known as the New Guinea palmyra palm, B. heineanus grows up to 20 m tall with a robust trunk ringed with leaf scars; the old leaves remain attached to the trunk, but eventually fall cleanly. The blueish-green leaves are deeply dissected, up to 3.2 m across and the petioles have very sharp edges, which can give a nasty cut to the unwary. As with all Borassus species, B. heineanus is dioecious with male and female flowers on separate trees. The male flowers are 1.5 cm long and in semi-circular clusters enclosed within leathery bracts, forming massive catkin-like inflorescences. In contrast, the female flowers are golfball-sized, solitary and rest on the surface of the inflorescence axis. After pollination, they develop into green fleshy fruits, each containing 1-3 seeds. Each seed is contained within a woody endocarp and in some cases, woody flanges inside the endocarp penetrate the seed.

Borassus heineanus differs from all other Borassus species in that it is found in tropical forests, rather than open savannas, resulting in a leaf anatomy resembling forest palms rather than other Borassus species. This led palm botanist Odoardo Beccari to suggest that B. heineanus might be more akin to the forest palm genus Borassodendron, however DNA evidence and pollen morphology clearly place B. heineanus within the genus Borassus.
