= Sap =

Fluid transported in xylem cells or phloem sieve tube elements of a plant

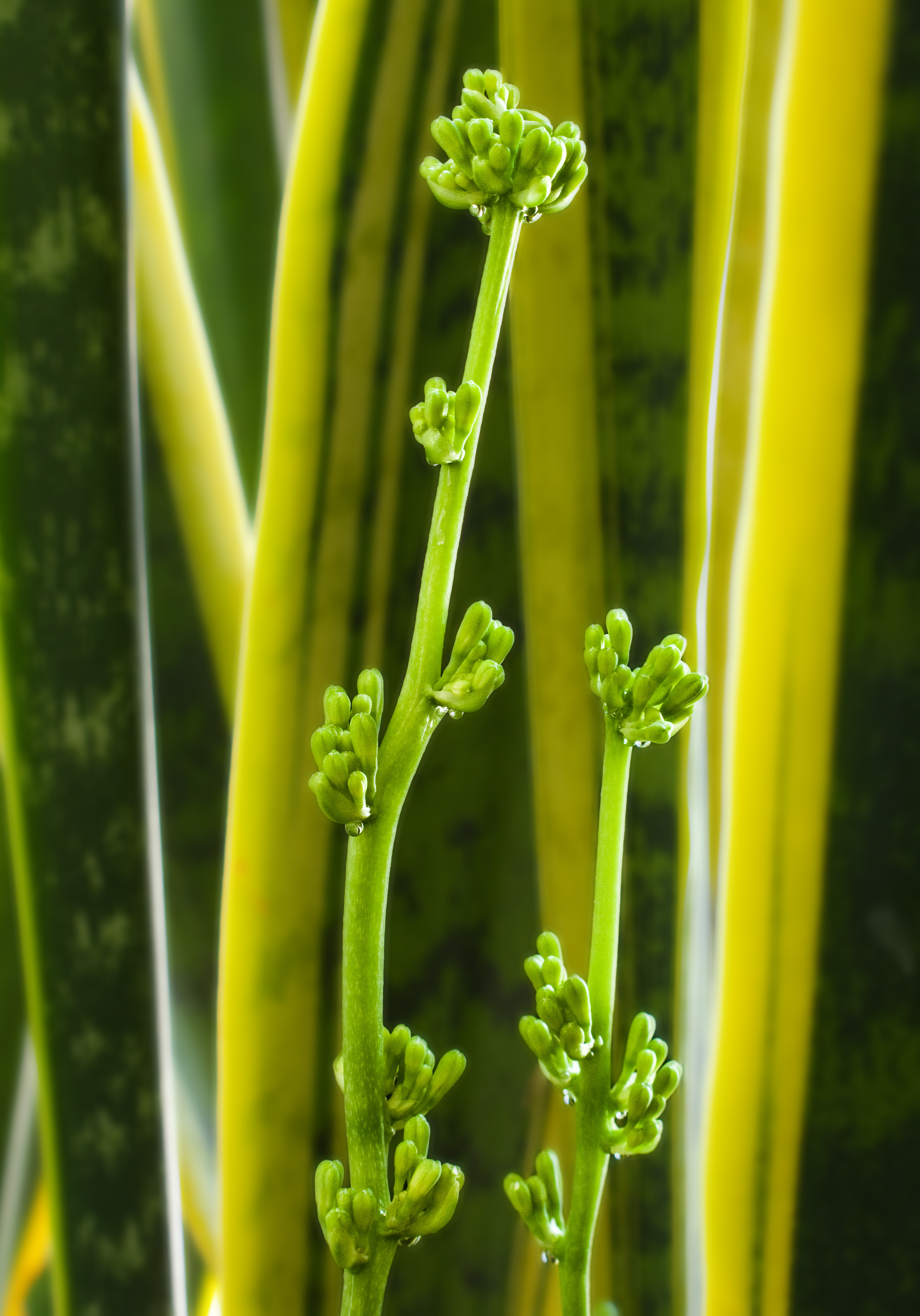
Sap droplets of Dracaena trifasciata

Sap is a fluid transported in the xylem cells (vessel elements or tracheids) or phloem sieve tube elements of a plant. These cells transport water and nutrients throughout the plant.

Sap is distinct from latex, resin, or cell sap; it is a separate substance, separately produced, and with different components and functions.

Insect honeydew is called sap, particularly when it falls from trees, but is only the remains of eaten sap and other plant parts.

== Types of sap ==
Saps may be broadly divided into two types: xylem sap and phloem sap.

=== Xylem sap ===
Xylem sap (pronounced /ˈzaɪləm/) consists primarily of a watery solution of hormones, mineral elements and other nutrients. Transport of sap in xylem is characterized by movement from the roots toward the leaves.

Over the past century, there has been some controversy regarding the mechanism of xylem sap transport; today, most plant scientists agree that the cohesion-tension theory best explains this process, but multiforce theories that hypothesize several alternative mechanisms have been suggested, including longitudinal cellular and xylem osmotic pressure gradients, axial potential gradients in the vessels, and gel- and gas-bubble-supported interfacial gradients.

Xylem sap transport can be disrupted by cavitation—an "abrupt phase change [of water] from liquid to vapor"—resulting in air-filled xylem conduits. In addition to being a fundamental physical limit on tree height, two environmental stresses can disrupt xylem transport by cavitation: increasingly negative xylem pressures associated with water stress, and freeze-thaw cycles in temperate climates.

=== Phloem sap ===
Phloem sap (pronounced /ˈfloʊɛm/) consists primarily of sugars (mainly sucrose), hormones, and mineral elements dissolved in water. It flows from where carbohydrates are produced or stored (sugar source) to where they are used (sugar sinks). The pressure flow hypothesis proposes a mechanism for phloem sap transport, although other hypotheses have been proposed. Phloem sap is thought to play a role in sending informational signals throughout vascular plants. According to Annual Review of Plant Biology,

Loading and unloading patterns are largely determined by the conductivity and number of plasmodesmata and the position-dependent function of solute-specific, plasma membrane transport proteins. Recent evidence indicates that mobile proteins and RNA are part of the plant's long-distance communication signaling system. Evidence also exists for the directed transport and sorting of macromolecules as they pass through plasmodesmata.

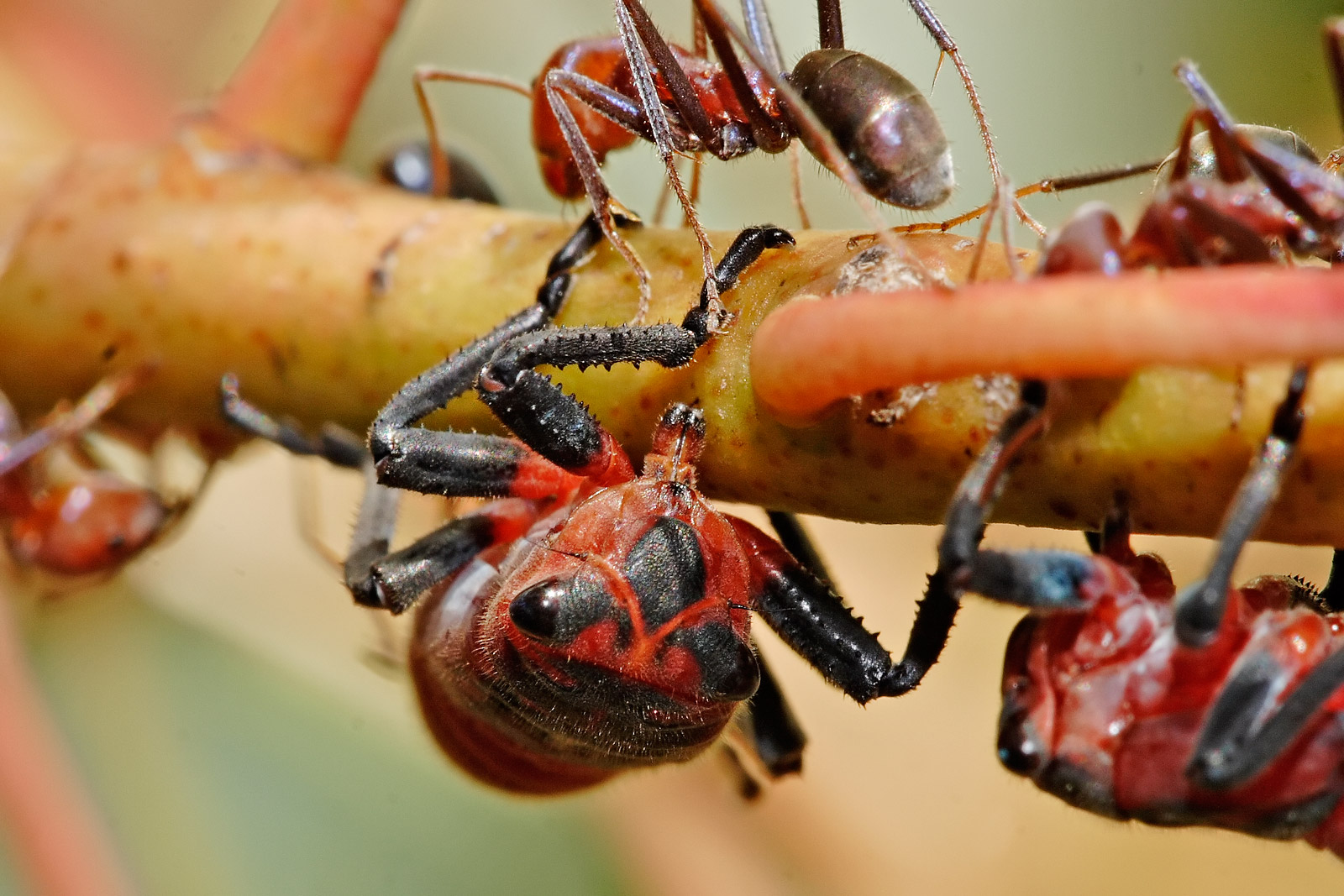
Leafhoppers feeding on sap, attended by ants

Many insects of the order Hemiptera (the half-wings), feed directly on phloem sap, and make it the primary component of their diet. Phloem sap is "nutrient-rich compared with many other plant products and generally lacking in toxins and feeding deterrents, [yet] it is consumed as the dominant or sole diet by a very restricted range of animals". This apparent paradox is explained by the fact that phloem sap is physiologically extreme in terms of animal digestion, and it is hypothesized that few animals take direct advantage of this because they lack two adaptations that are necessary to enable direct use by animals. These include the existence of a very high ratio of non-essential/essential amino acids in phloem sap for which these adapted Hemiptera insects contain symbiotic microorganisms which can then provide them with essential amino acids; and also insect "tolerance of the very high sugar content and osmotic pressure of phloem sap is promoted by their possession in the gut of sucrase-transglucosidase activity, which transforms excess ingested sugar into long-chain oligosaccharides." A much larger set of animals do however consume phloem sap by proxy, either "through feeding on the honeydew of phloem-feeding hemipterans. Honeydew is physiologically less extreme than phloem sap, with a higher essential/non-essential amino acid ratio and lower osmotic pressure," or by feeding on the biomass of insects that have grown on more direct ingestion of phloem sap.

== Human uses ==
Maple syrup is made from reduced sugar maple xylem sap. The sap often is harvested from the sugar maple, Acer saccharum.

In some countries (e.g., Lithuania, Latvia, Estonia, Finland, Belarus, Russia) harvesting the early spring sap of birch trees (so called "birch juice") for human consumption is common practice; the sap can be used fresh or fermented.

Certain palm tree sap can be used to make palm syrup. In the Canary Islands they use the Canary Island date palm while in Chile they use the Chilean wine palm to make their syrup called miel de palma.

In Australia, manna gum drops a hard sap that can be sucked on. Species of wattle also produce gum for chewing or drinking as a cordial. The sap of cider gum, which grows in the Tasmanian highlands, has been traditionally used to brew the fermented drink wayalinah.

== See also ==
- Guttation
- Latex
- Resin
