= Palm syrup =

Edible syrup

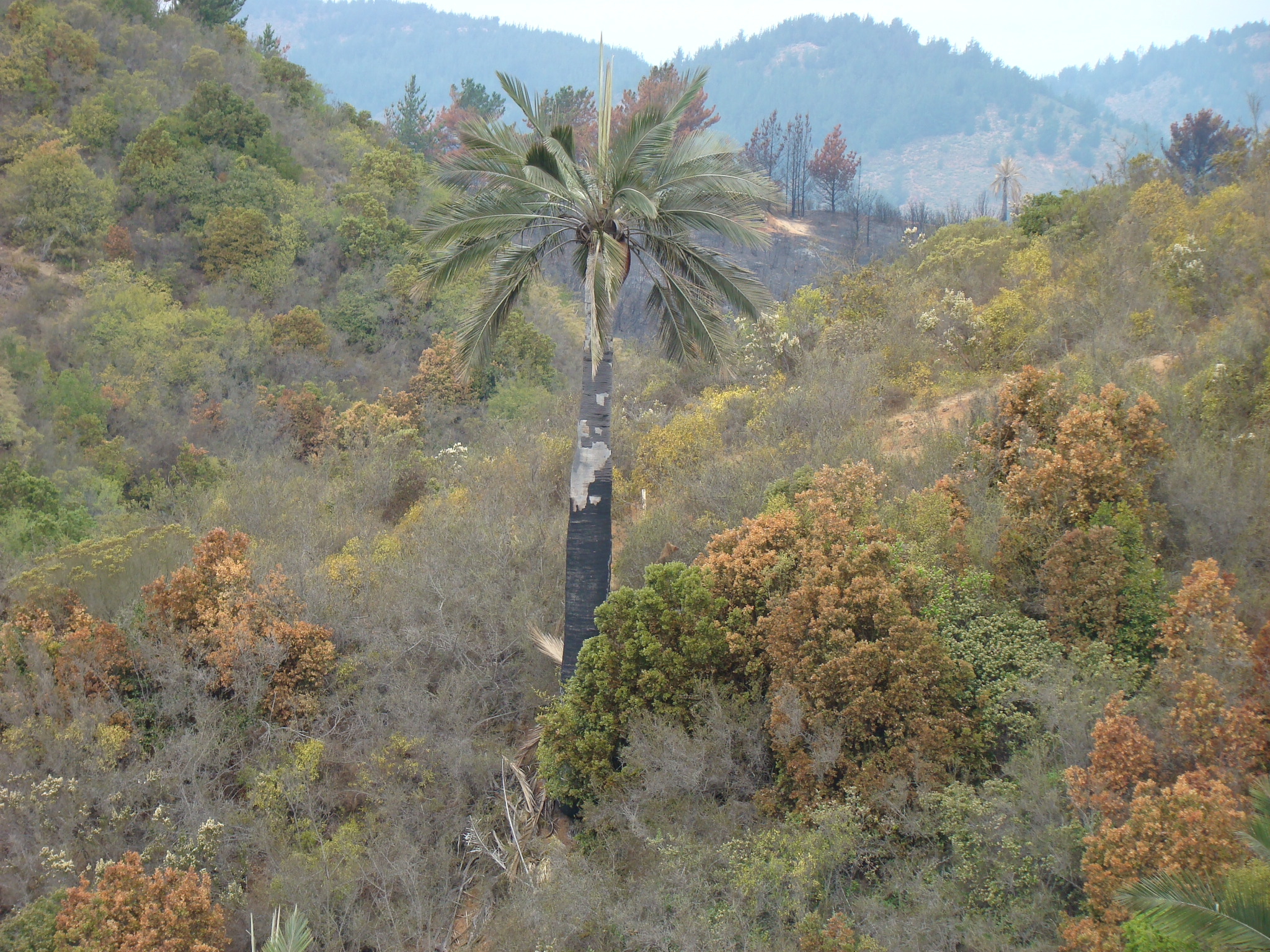
Chilean wine palm, a source of palm syrup, in its native habitat

Palm syrup (Spanish: Miel de palma, lit. 'palm honey') is an edible sweet syrup produced from the sap of a number of palms. It is produced in the Canary Islands and coastal regions of South America.

== Species ==
In the Canary Islands, palm syrup is produced from the Canary Island date palm (Phoenix canariensis). In Chile, palm syrup is produced from the endangered Chilean wine palm (Jubaea chilensis). Other species used include the coconut palm, sugar palm, and palmyra palm.

== Production in the Canary Islands ==
Most guarapo and miel de palma production occurs in the municipality of Vallehermoso on La Gomera. The process of collecting sap from the palm and concentrating it into syrup is similar in many ways to the process used for maple syrup.

The sap, known as guarapo or garapa, is collected from a bowl-shaped depression cut into the crown of the tree. As guarapo spoils quickly in sunlight, the harvesting is done overnight. Every evening during the harvesting season, the guarapero (farmer) prepares each tree. He climbs to the top of the tree, often using a ladder, uses a sharp knife or chisel to trim the bowl to remove surface crust and open the pores, and hoists a bucket into place beneath a pipe or channel leading from the bowl. Early the next morning, he returns and collects the filled buckets, containing ten or more litres from each tree.

The harvested guarapo is then brought to, or collected by, a local processing plant, or may be processed on site. Processing involves boiling the sap for several hours until it is reduced by about 90% to a dark brown syrup that is rich and sweet. It is then packaged, typically in glass jars. Palm syrup tends to thicken and crystallize over time.

After about four to five months of being harvested every day, during the period January to June, a tree needs five years to recuperate before it is used again.

== Uses ==
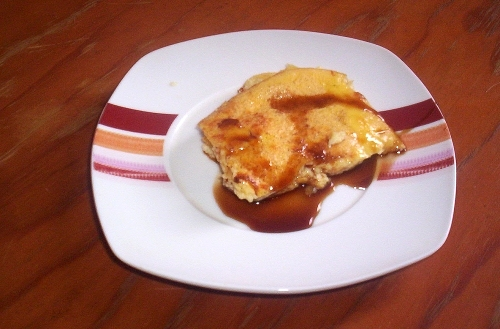
Leche asada (a kind of crème caramel) with miel de palma

Palm syrup is used to accompany many pastries and desserts, such as pancakes and ice cream. The syrup is widely used in Southeast Asian cooking. In West Bengal, where it is known as jhola gur, it is only obtainable in winter.

Its sweetness tempers the flavours of spicy curries, adding its rich, molasses-like flavour to the food. It is also widely used as an ingredient in desserts, or drizzled over prepared foods.

Palm sap is a refreshing drink, and fermented palm syrup is distilled to produce various alcohols such as arrack, a spirit similar to rum. On La Gomera, the palm honey obtained from the sap is mixed with parra (similar to grappa) to produce Gomerón.

Palm syrup is also traditionally used on La Gomera for general medicinal purposes.

== See also ==
- Palm sugar
- Birch syrup
- Sugarcane juice
- Jaggery
- List of syrups
- Pithe
- Basirhat
- Minicoy Island
- Palm wine
