= Talgach (poem) =

Poem by Rabindranath Tagore

- by Rabindranath Tagore
- Original title: তালগাছ
- Country: India, Bangladesh
- Language: Bengali
- Genre: Poem
- Lines: 24

Talgach (Bengali: তালগাছ) is a famous Bengali poem written by Rabindranath Tagore. It is included in the poetry book Sishu Bholanath. Tagore wrote it especially for the children. It has 24 rhythmic lines. The poem is about the palm tree.
