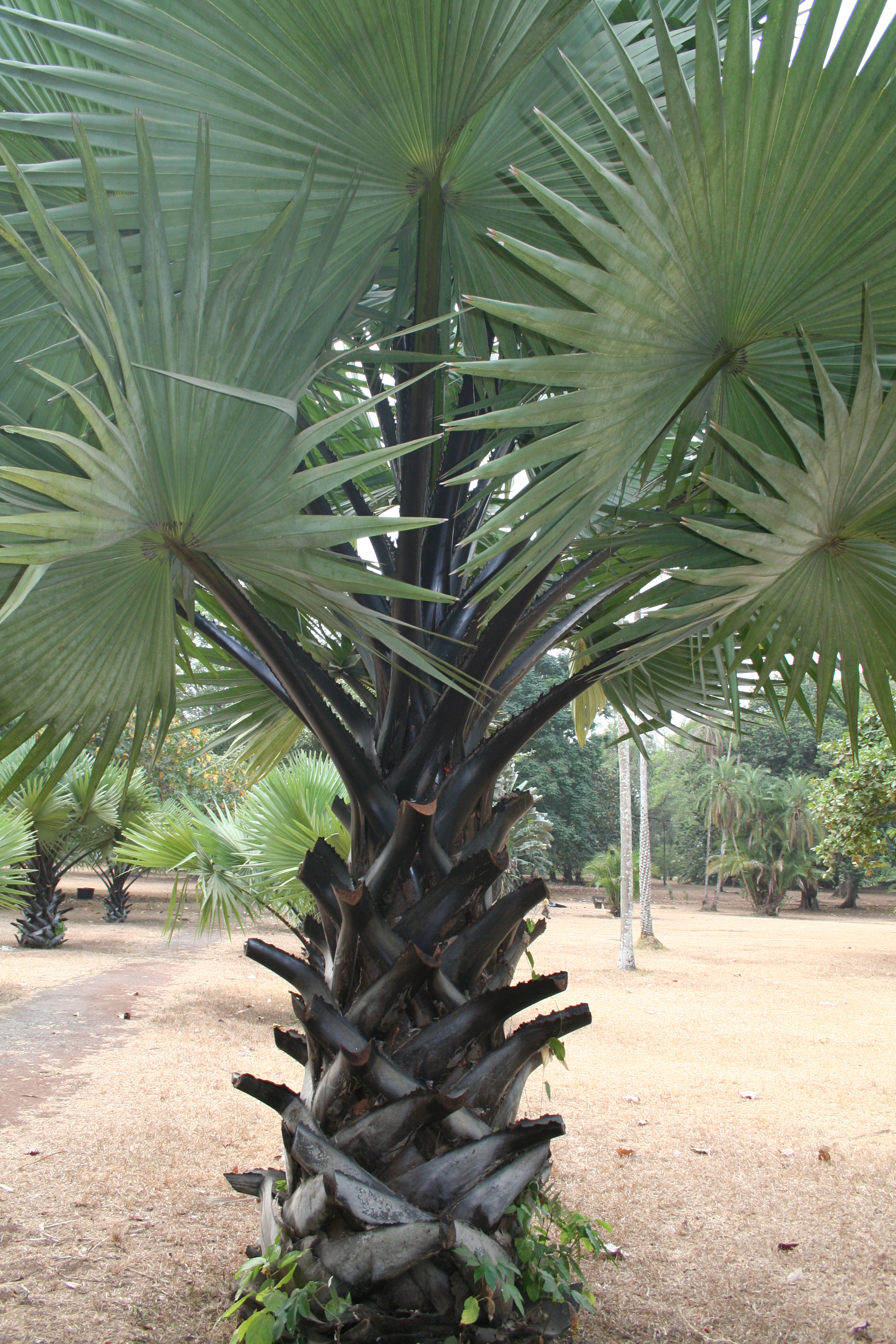

Conservation status
- Least Concern (IUCN 3.1)

Scientific classification
- Kingdom: Plantae
- Clade: Tracheophytes
- Clade: Angiosperms
- Clade: Monocots
- Clade: Commelinids
- Order: Arecales
- Family: Arecaceae
- Genus: Borassus
- Species: B. aethiopum

Binomial name
- Borassus aethiopum Mart.

Synonyms
- Borassus aethiopum var. bagamojense Becc.; Borassus aethiopum var. senegalense Becc.; Borassus deleb Becc.; Borassus flabellifer L. var. aethiopum (Mart.) Warb.; Borassus sambiranensis Jum. & H. Perrier

= Borassus aethiopum =

Species of palm

Borassus aethiopum is a species of Borassus palm from Africa. In English, it is variously referred to as African fan palm, African palmyra palm, deleb palm, ron palm, toddy palm, black rhun palm, rônier palm (from the French). It is widespread across much of tropical Africa from Senegal to Ethiopia and south to northern South Africa, though it is largely absent from the forested areas of Central Africa and desert regions such as the Sahara and Namib. This palm also grows in northwest Madagascar and the Comoros.

== Description ==
The typical form of Borassus aethiopum is a solitary palm to 25 metres (82 feet) in height and 1 m (3.3 ft) in diameter at the base. In the river bottoms (floodplains) of many East African rivers (the Rufiji in Tanzania and the Tana in Kenya among others) a closely related form can be up to 7 ft (2.1 m) thick at breast height (4 ft or 1.2 m above ground) and having the same thickness in its upper ventricosity. It also has a height of up to 100 ft (30 m). The fan-shaped leaves are 3 m (9.8 ft) wide (larger, to 12 ft or 3.7 m in the bottomlands form) with petioles 2 m (6.6 ft) long; the margins are armed with spines. In male plants, the small flowers are largely concealed within the scaly catkins; the much larger female flowers reach two centimetres (0.79 inches) wide and produce yellow to brown fruits. Each fruit contains one to three seeds, each enclosed within a woody endocarp. The floodplains variety is almost certainly the most massive of all palms, comparable to Jubaea chilensis, the Chilean wine palm.

== Uses ==
The tree has many uses: the fruit are edible, as are the tender roots produced by the young plant; fibres can be obtained from the leaves; and the wood (which is reputed to be termite-proof) can be used in construction. The fruit's epicarp may be cooked and pressed to prepare a porridge prized by the Baoulé and Kulango peoples of Côte d'Ivoire.

== See also ==
- Great Mosque of Djenné (an example of the use of the wood in construction)
