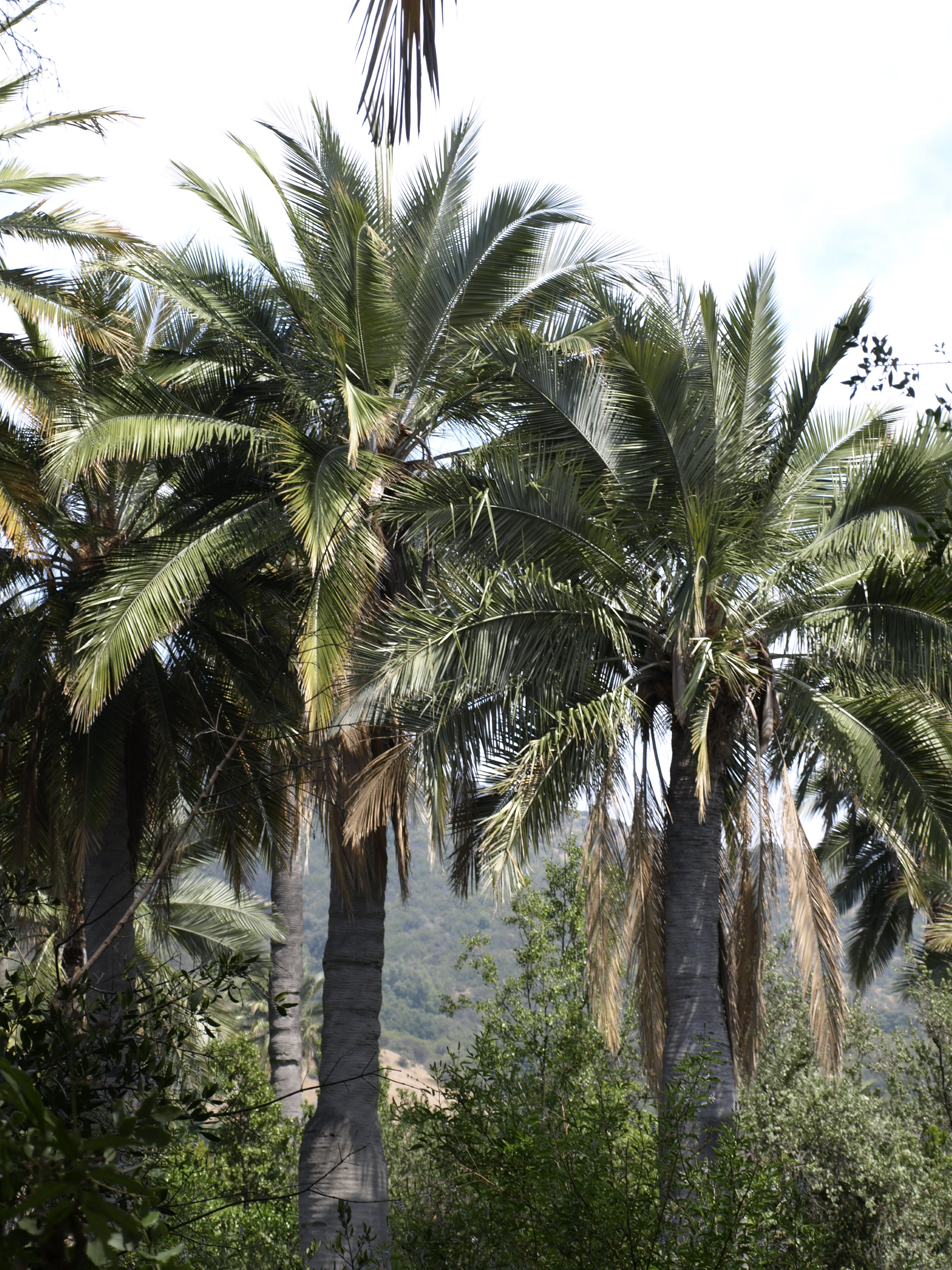

Conservation status
- Endangered (IUCN 3.1)

Scientific classification
- Kingdom: Plantae
- Clade: Embryophytes
- Clade: Tracheophytes
- Clade: Angiosperms
- Clade: Monocots
- Clade: Commelinids
- Order: Arecales
- Family: Arecaceae
- Subfamily: Arecoideae
- Tribe: Cocoseae
- Subtribe: Attaleinae
- Genus: Jubaea; Kunth
- Species: J. chilensis

Binomial name
- Jubaea chilensis (Molina) Baill.

Synonyms
- Cocos chilensis (Molina) Molina; Jubaea spectabilis Kunth; Micrococos chilensis (Molina) Phil.; Molinaea micrococos Bertero

= Jubaea =

Genus of palms

Jubaea is a genus of palms with one species, Jubaea chilensis, commonly known in English as the Chilean wine palm or Chile cocopalm, and palma chilena in Spanish. It is native to southwestern South America and is endemic to a small area of central Chile between 32°S and 35°S in southern Coquimbo, Valparaíso, Santiago, O'Higgins, and northern Maule regions.

The extinct palm tree of Easter Island belonged to this genus as well. In 1991, the Easter Island palm was placed in its own genus, Paschalococos. However, this has not been widely accepted.

== Growth ==
In its area of natural distribution, young Jubaeas tend to grow near adult specimens, preferring also sunny and vegetated sites.

The thickest well-documented Jubaea was on the estate of J. Harrison Wright in Riverside, California. Its diameter "at shoulder height" was 1.7 m (66 in). The largest of several specimens at the Adelaide (South Australia) Botanic Garden in 1889 was stated to be 1.8 m (6 ft) thick at the base. A hollow (but living) Jubaea in the Ocoa Valley near La Campana National Park, Chile, is 1.5–1.8 m (4 ft 11 in – 5 ft 11 in) thick at its base, with no apparent taper in the lower trunk. The largest individual specimen of indoor plant in the world was the Jubaea chilensis at Kew Gardens, which was cut off by staff in 2014 because it grew to the top of its greenhouse. Of the more than 2,600 known species of palms, Jubaea chilensis is the second most massive, exceeded only by the floodplain or river bottom variety of Borassus aethiopum. Karsten and Schenck reported a maximum height of 34 m (112 ft) for Jubaea.

== Uses ==
The leaves can be used to weave baskets, and it has edible seeds, widely eaten and known as Coquito nuts. The sap can be used to make palm wine and palm syrup, although, unlike other palms which can be tapped, the whole tree has to be felled; this is now restricted by legal protection.

== Conservation ==
The species is partially protected within Chile, although pressures of human population growth and expansion of grazing areas have reduced the population of the Chilean wine palm in recent centuries. The collection of its seed and their predation by common degu may also have a negative impact on the growth of new generations of Jubea. The IUCN Red List considers the palm Endangered. In August 2026, the Council of Ministers for Sustainability and Climate Change of Chile included the Chilean palm in Appendix I of the Convention on International Trade in Endangered Species of Wild Fauna and Flora, the highest level of protection, restricting the palm's international trade to non-commercial purposes.

A recent study concluded that predation of the fruits by humans, the seeds by the exotic rat (Rattus rattus) and the young seedlings by exotic rabbits is leading to seed dispersal collapse of this species, leaving it at risk of extinction in its natural habitat. Fruit harvesting by people is shown to be unsustainable and is also a major threat to this endangered species.

Analysis of tooth residue of the extinct gomphothere (elephant relative) Notiomastodon platensis, which became extinct around 12,000 years ago as part of the end-Pleistocene extinction event, found that it consumed Chilean wine palm fruit and probably acted as a seed disperser for the species, suggesting that the dispersal ability of Chilean wine palm had already been impacted prior to modern times.

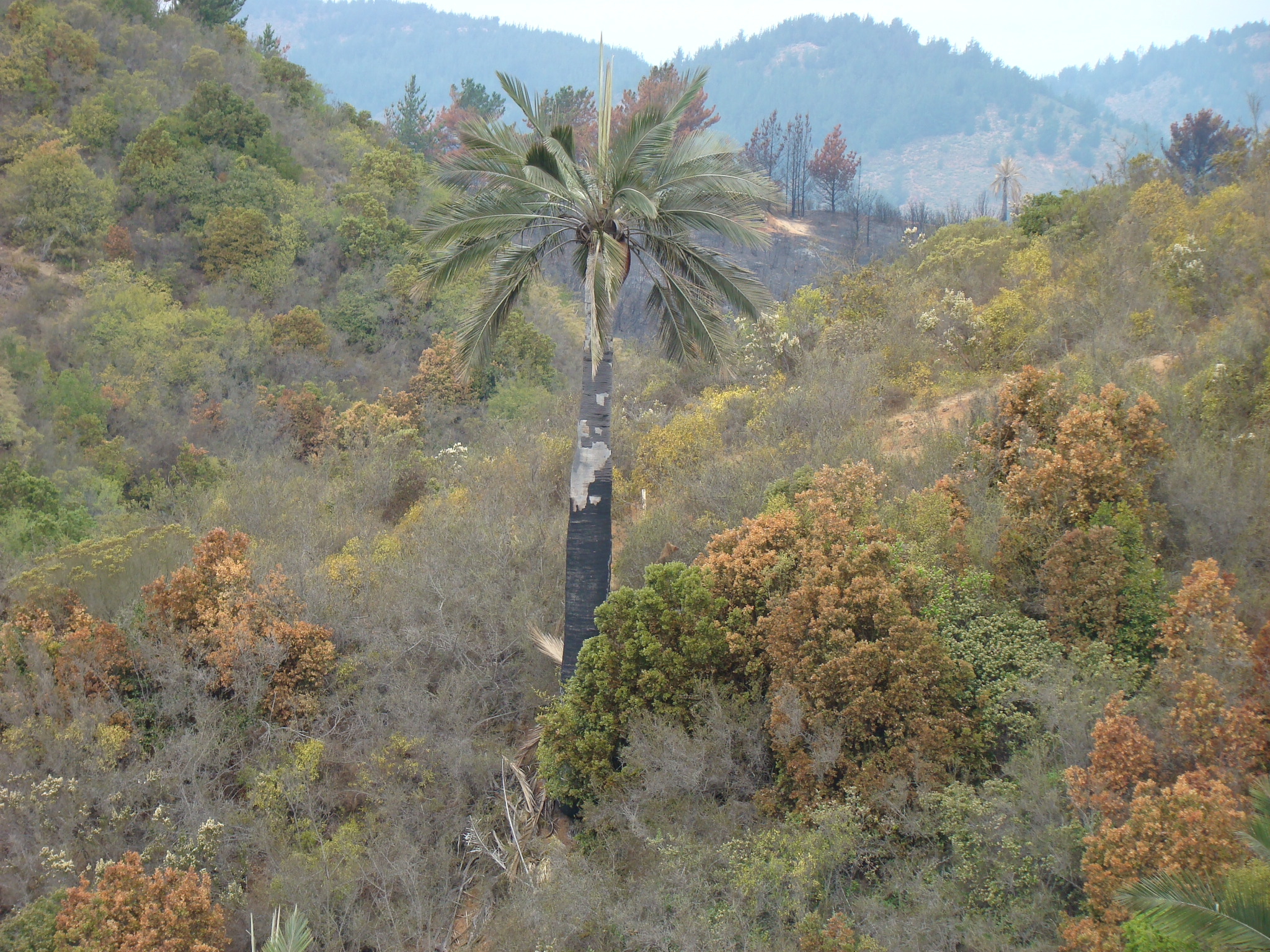
J. chilensis growing in habitat in Palmar El Salto, Viña del Mar, Chile

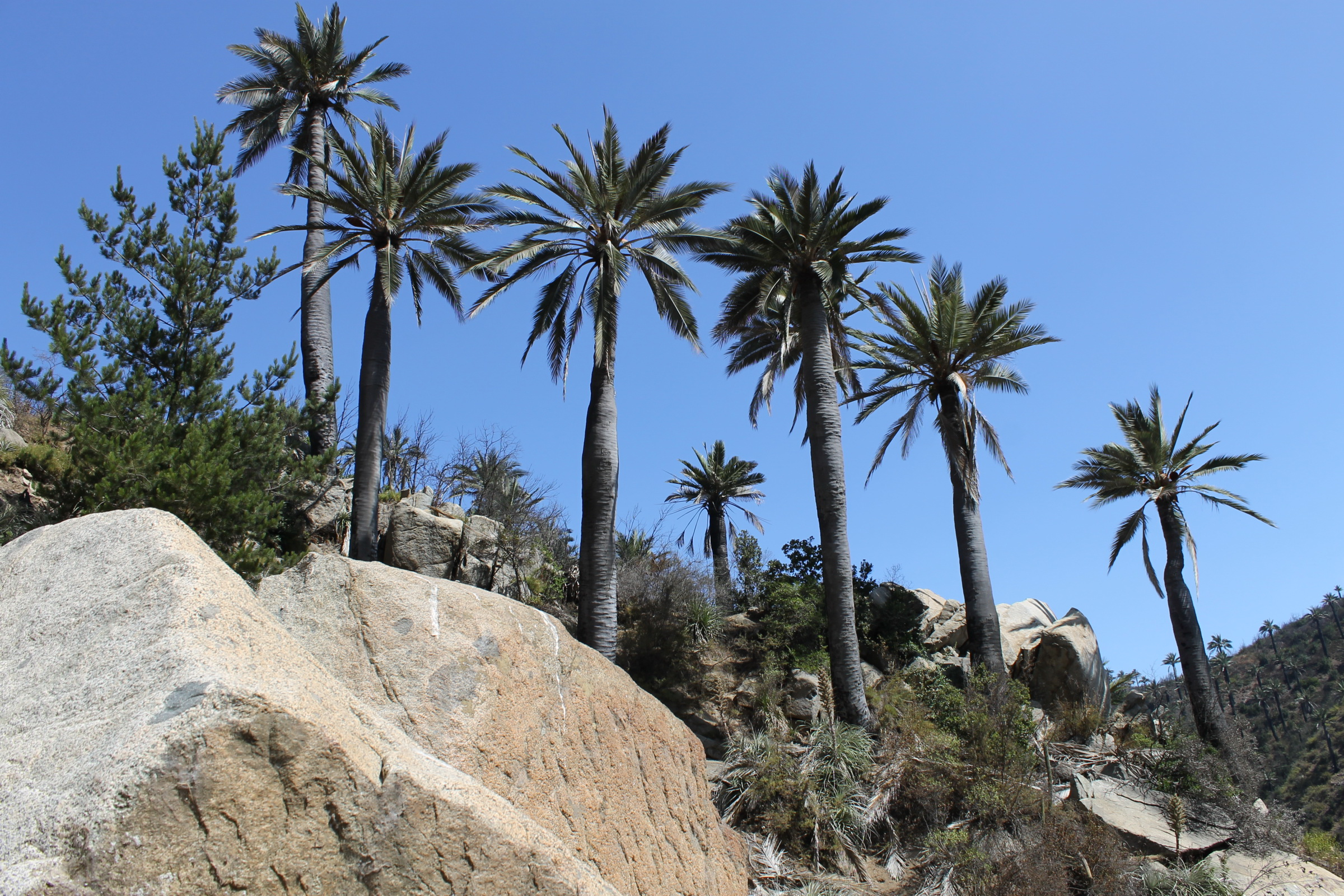
J. chilensis growing in habitat in Palmar El Salto, Viña del Mar, Chile

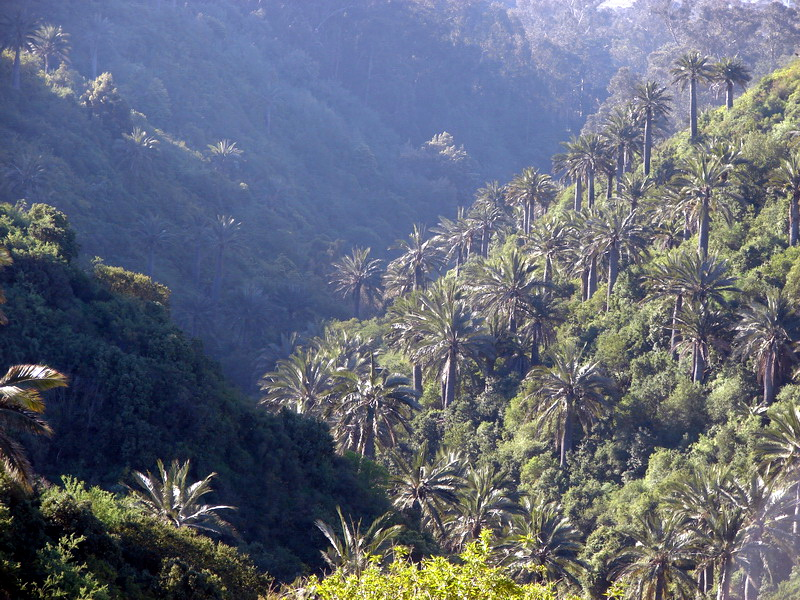
J. chilensis growing in habitat in Quebrada Rodelillo, Chile

== Taxonomy ==
The species was originally described as Palma chilensis by Chilean botanist Juan Ignacio Molina in 1808. After being moved to other genera including Molinaea, Micrococos and Cocos by other botanists, it was finally placed in the genus Jubaea by French botanist Henri Ernest Baillon in 1895, as J. chilensis (Molina) Baill.

Jubaea is named after King Juba II.

== History ==
Charles Darwin examined these trees on visiting Chile in 1832 on the second voyage of HMS Beagle and noted:

These palms are, for their family, ugly trees. Their trunk is very large, and of a curious form, being thicker in the middle than at the base or top.

— Charles Darwin

In 1843, a specimen was grown from seed at Kew Gardens, London, England, and was moved into the Temperate House in 1863, eventually growing to 19 metres (62 ft). It was believed to be the world's tallest indoor plant, until it had to be felled in 2013 because it had outgrown the space available and could not be moved. It has been replaced by seedlings from the original tree.

== Gallery ==
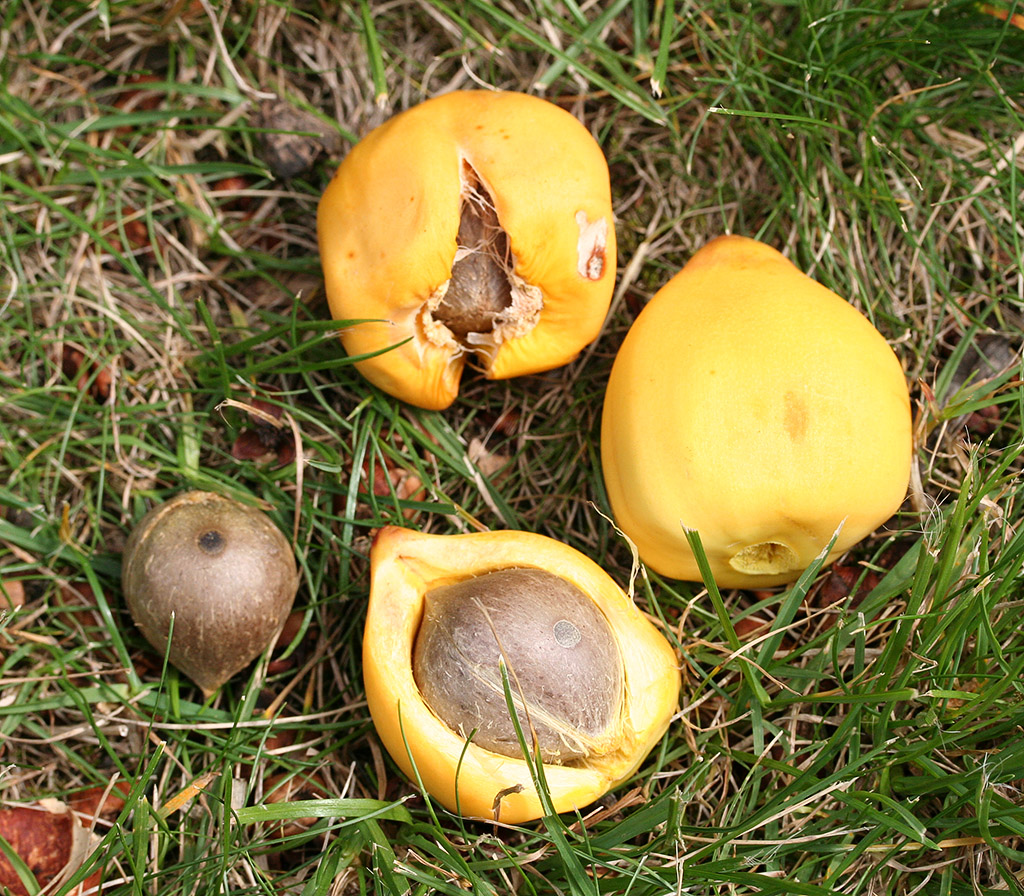
Fruits and nuts

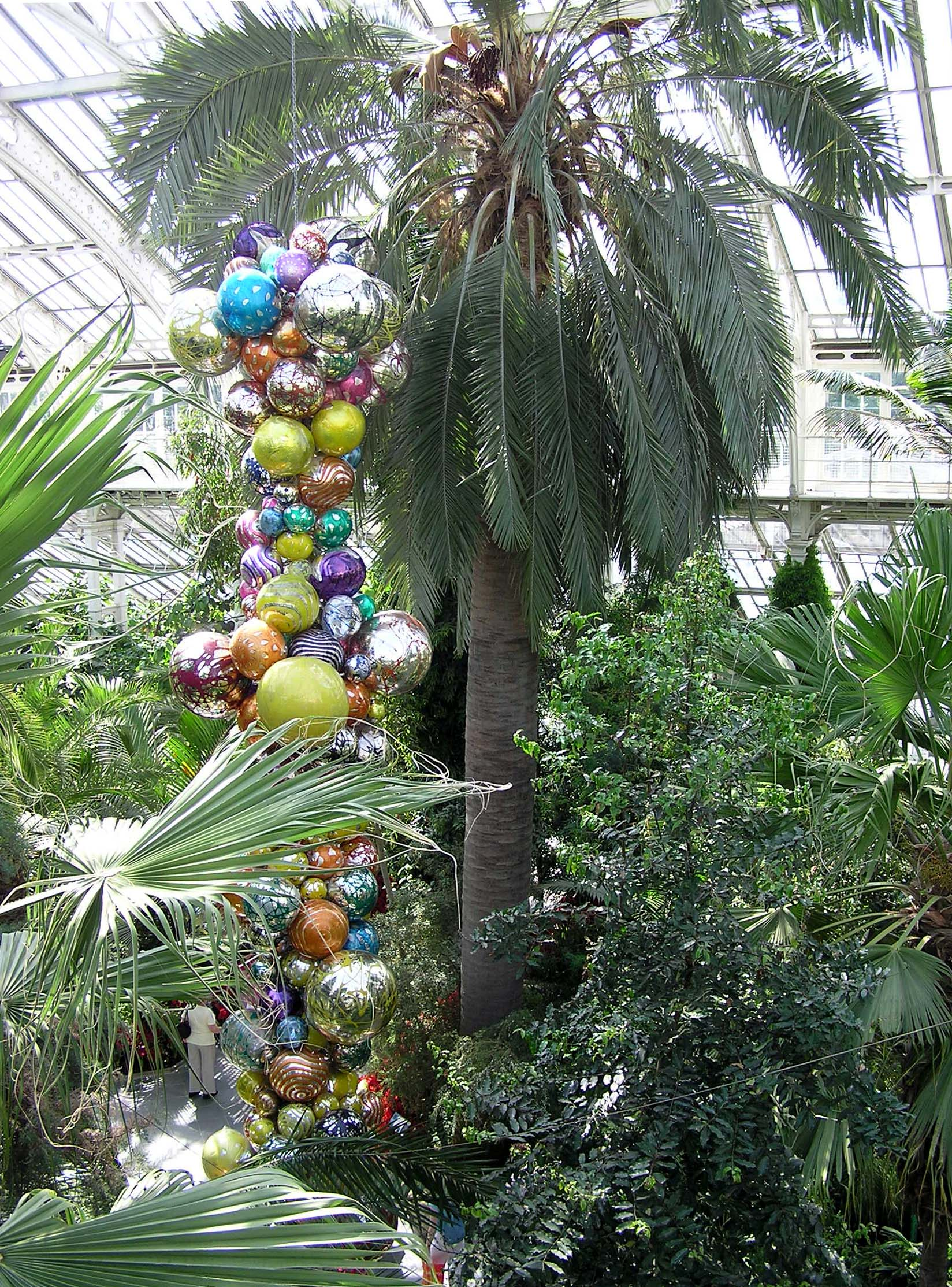
World-record Jubaea at Kew Gardens, England

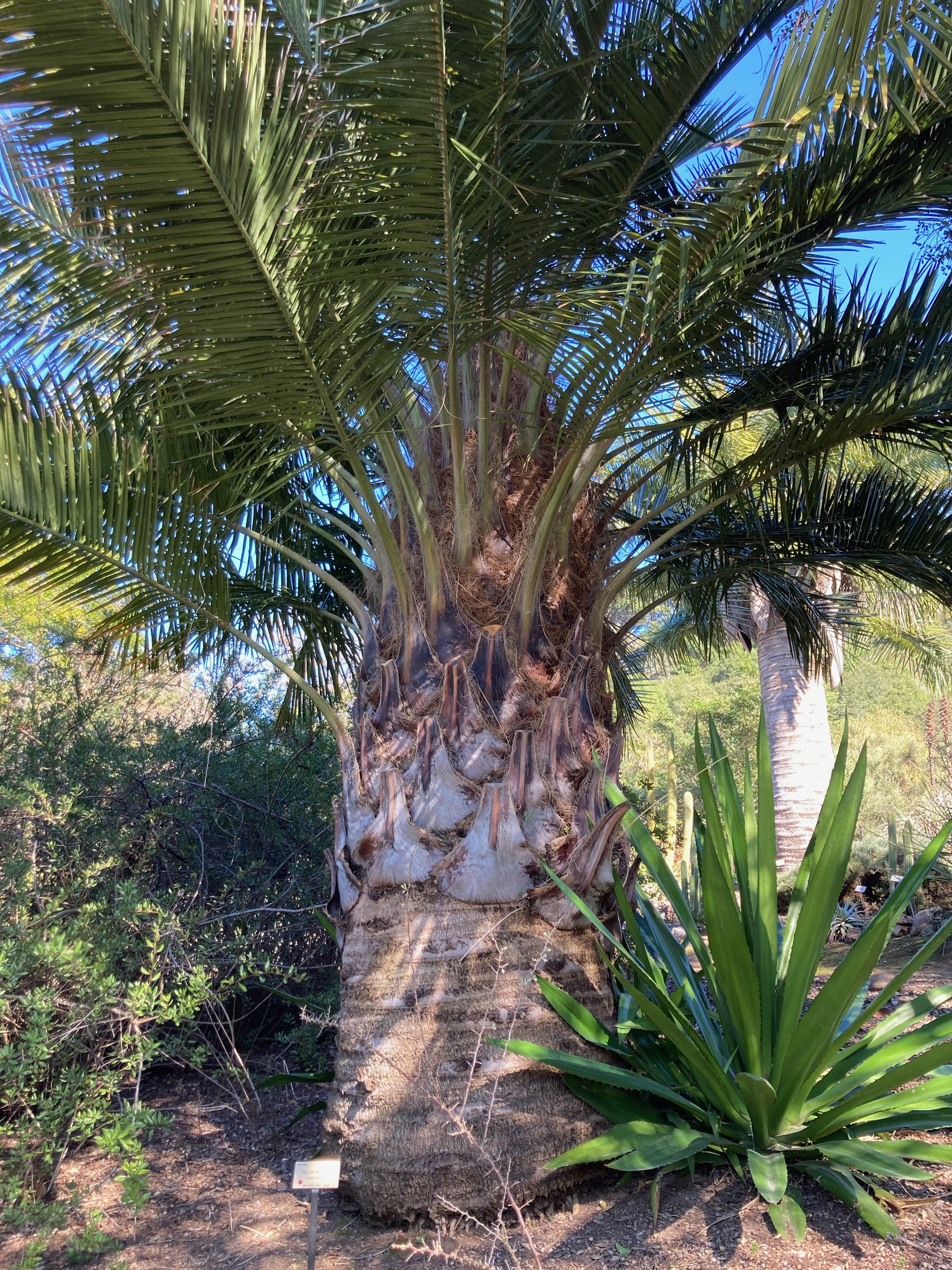
Jubaea chilensis at UC Berkeley Botanical Garden.

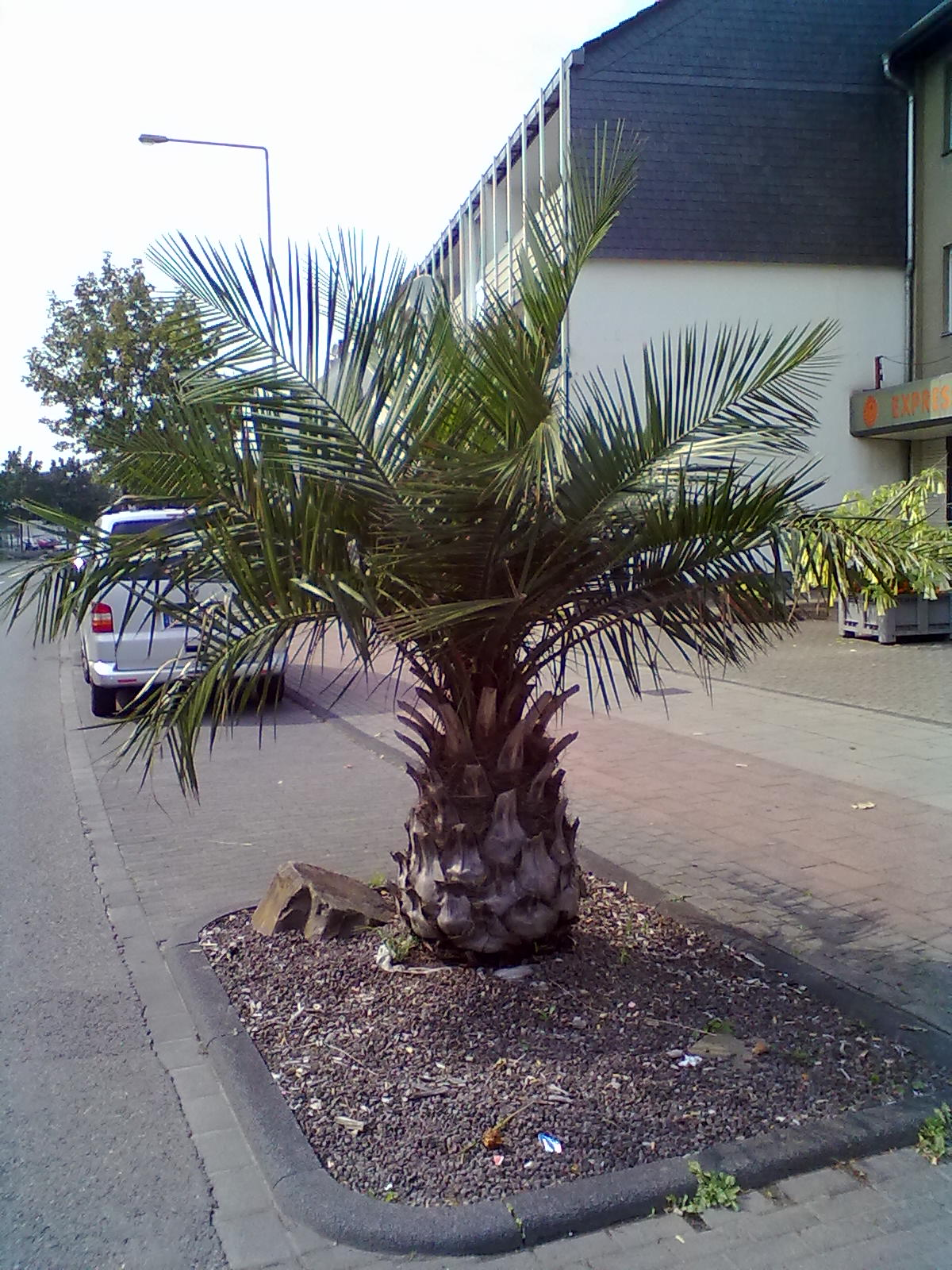
Jubaea chilensis in Leverkusen, Germany

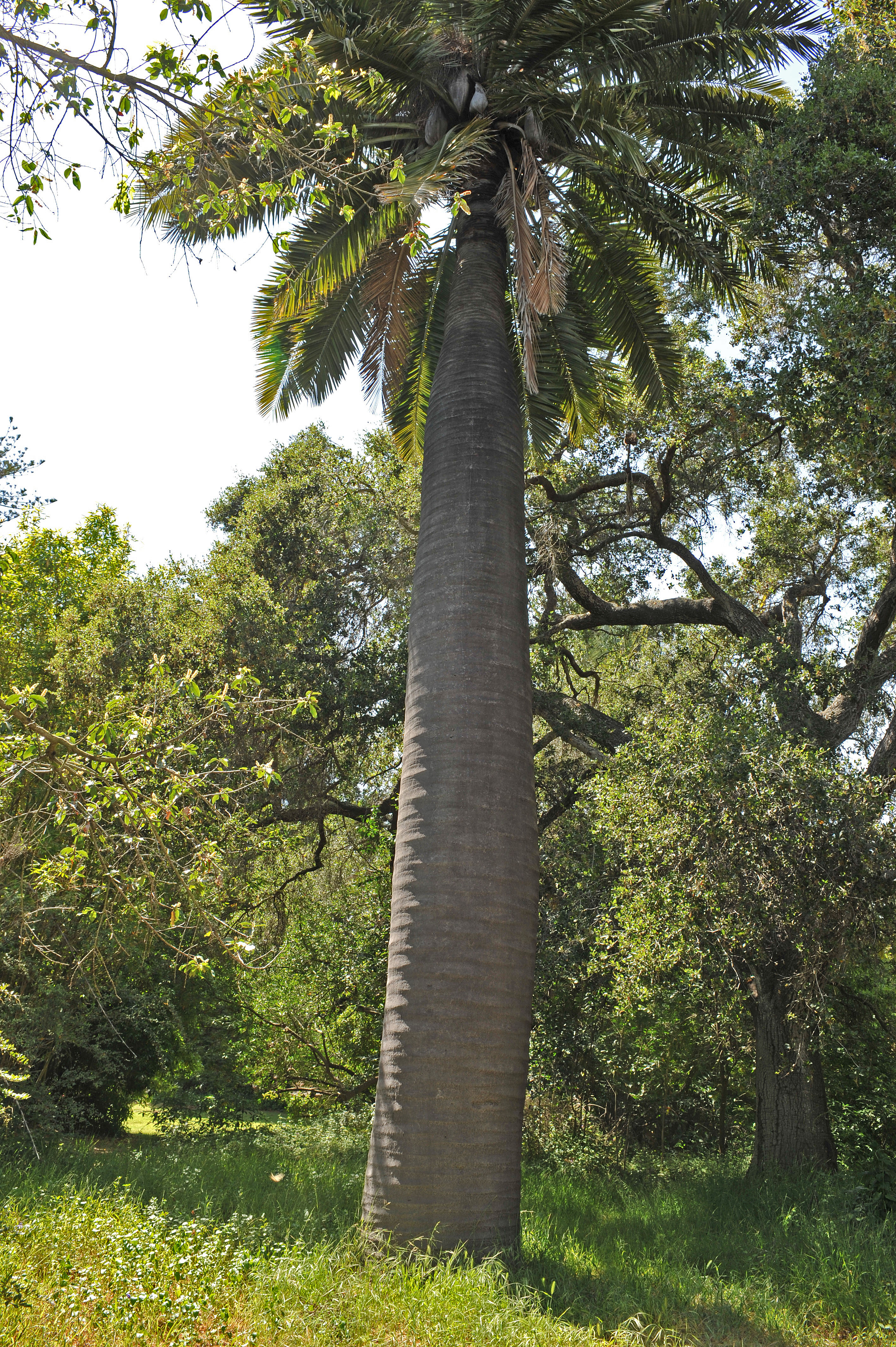
Jubaea chilensis growing in Goleta, California

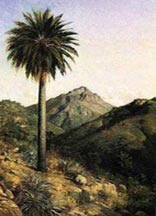
Painting of a Jubaea by Chilean artist Onofre Jarpa

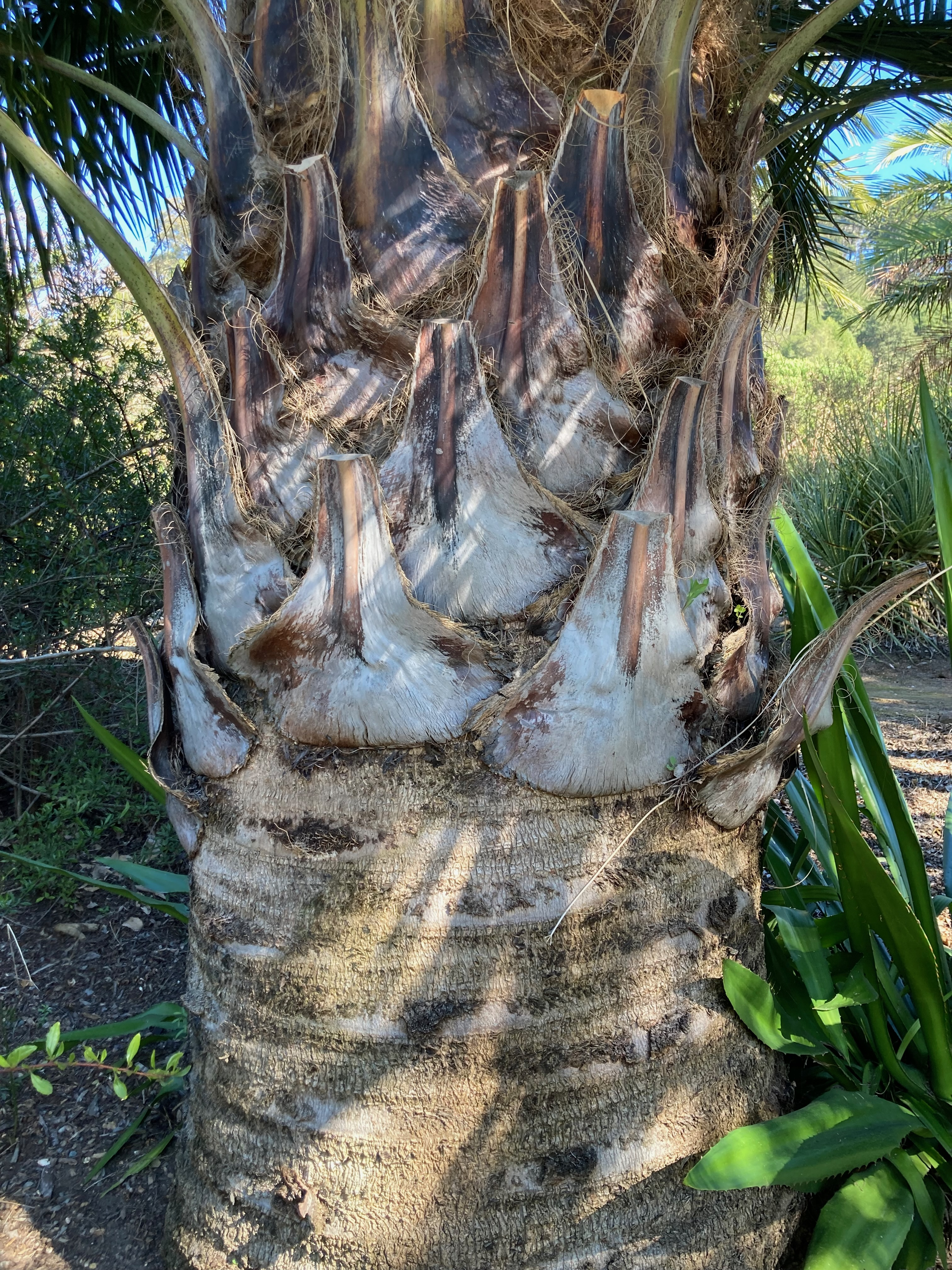
Detail of Jubaea chilensis trunk.

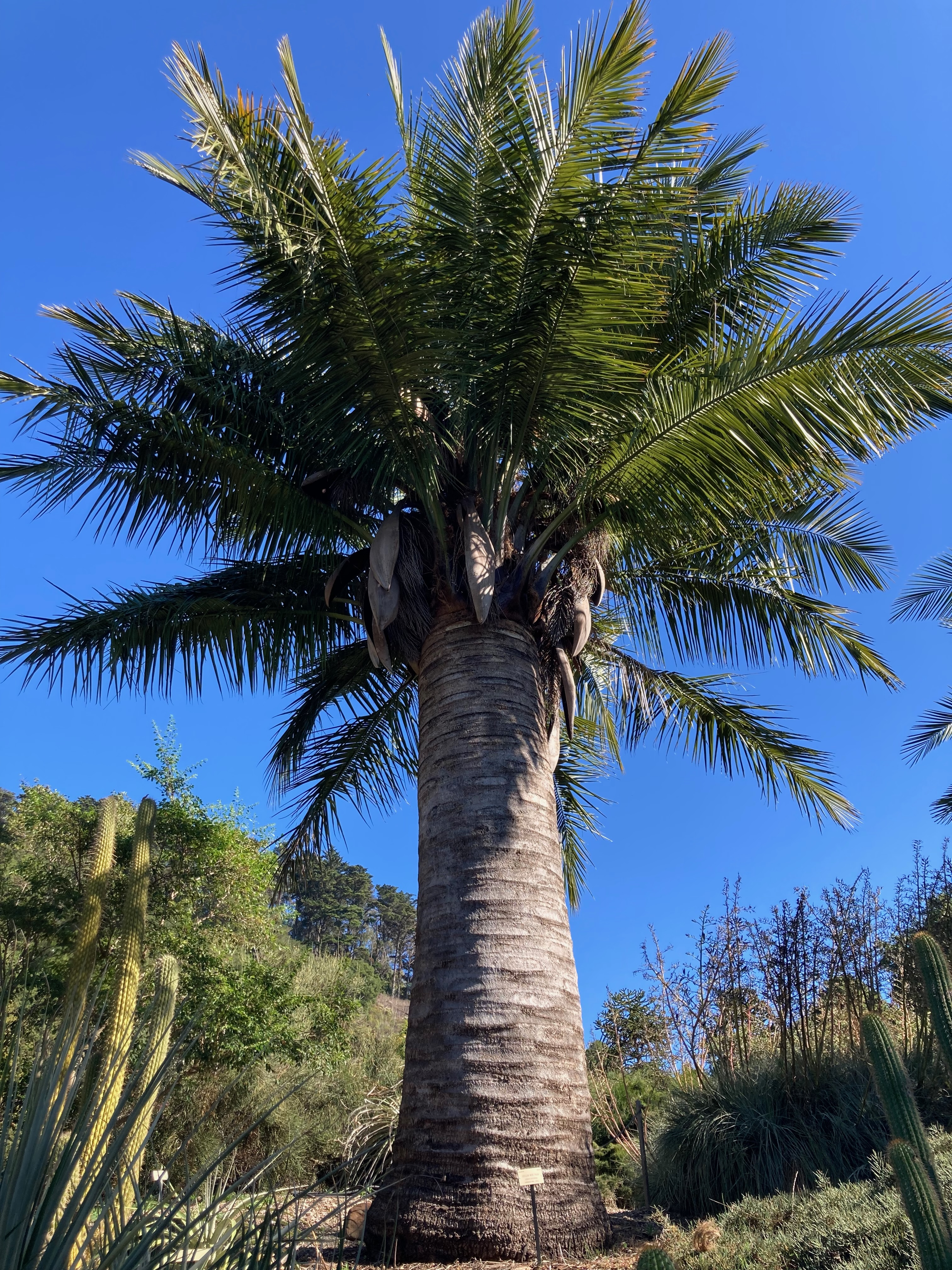
Jubaea chilensis showing the girth of the trunk.

== See also ==
- Dasyphyllum excelsum
