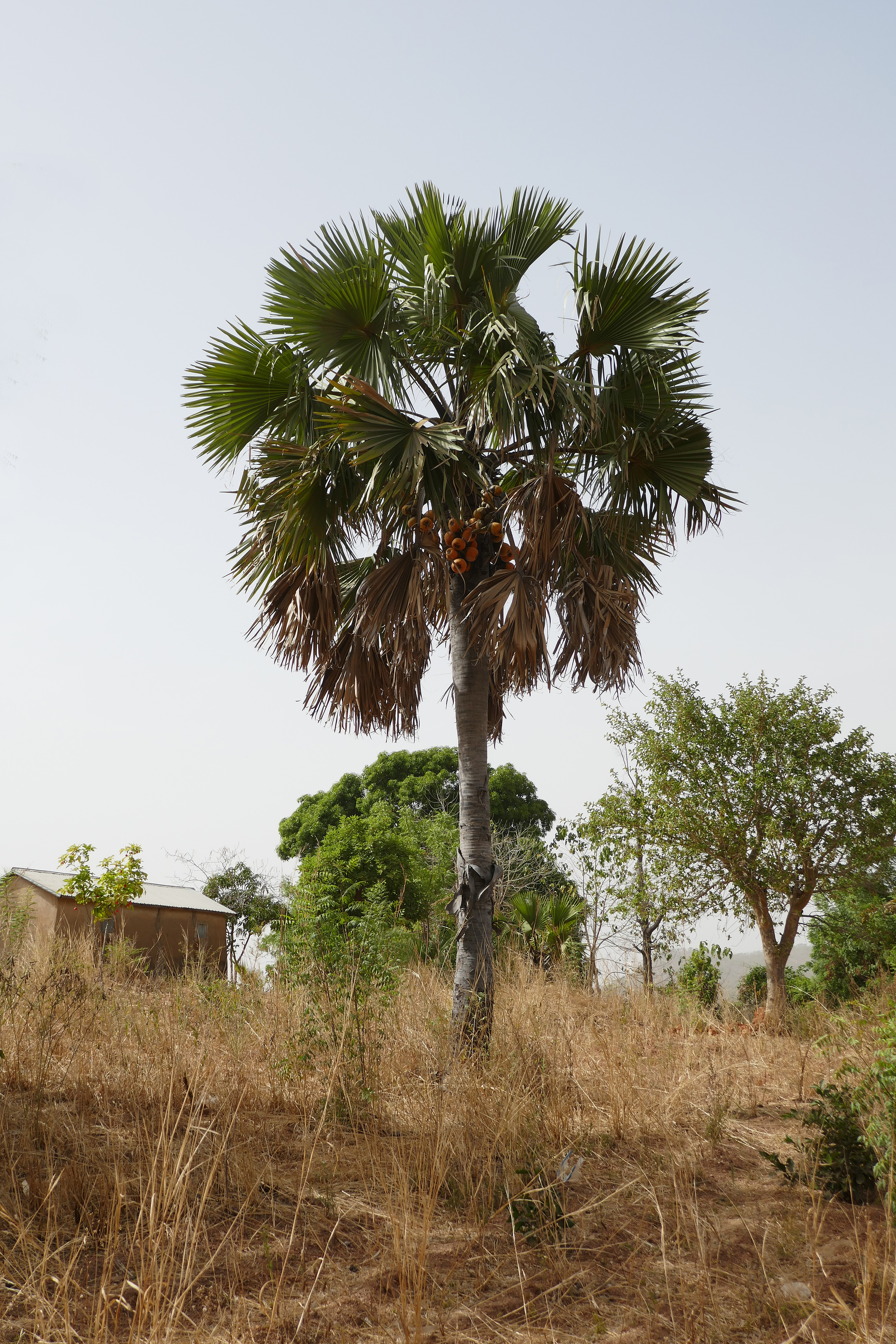
- Borassus aethiopum in Atakora, Benin

Scientific classification
- Kingdom: Plantae
- Clade: Embryophytes
- Clade: Tracheophytes
- Clade: Spermatophytes
- Clade: Angiosperms
- Clade: Monocots
- Clade: Commelinids
- Order: Arecales
- Family: Arecaceae
- Subfamily: Coryphoideae
- Tribe: Borasseae; Mart.

Type genus
- Borassus L.

Genera
- Bismarckia Hildebrandt & H. Wendl. Borassodendron Becc. Borassus L. Hyphaene Gaertn. Latania Comm. ex Juss. Lodoicea Comm. ex DC. Medemia Wurttemb. ex H. Wendl. Satranala J.Dransf. & Beentje

= Borasseae =

Borasseae Temporal range: Maastrichtian–Recent

Tribe of palms

Borasseae is a tribe in the palm subfamily Coryphoideae. The tribe ranges from southern Africa and Madagascar north through the Arabian Peninsula to India, Indochina, Indonesia and New Guinea. Several genera are restricted to islands in the Indian Ocean. The two largest genera, Hyphaene and Borassus, are also the most widespread.

== Description ==
Borassoid palms typically have large, column-like trunks, though several species of Hyphaene have branching or clustered stems. The leaves are large, palmate and often with spines or sharp edges along the petioles. Leaves are retained on young palm stems, later falling to reveal prominent scars. All genera in the Borasseae are dioecious, with separate male and female trees; they are pleonanthic, flowering regularly for many years. Inflorescences are large and pendulous; the male flowers are much smaller than the female and are borne in clusters within catkin-like structures. Fruits contain hard, woody endocarps surrounding the seeds; they range in size from date-sized (Latania) to the massive fruits of Lodoicea, which contain the largest seed in the world.

== Taxonomy ==
The Borasseae is one of eight tribes in subfamily Coryphoideae. The tribe is monophyletic and most phylogenetic studies place it as sister to tribe Corypheae, though it is also close to tribe Caryoteae and tribe Chuniophoeniceae. Together, the four tribes make up the syncarpous clade, all members of which have syncarpous ovaries with united carpels.

The eight genera of tribe Borasseae split evenly into two subtribes. In the palms of subtribe Hyphaenieae, both the male and female flowers are sunken within pits and the fruits are stalked and typically one-seeded. Bismarckia (1 sp., B. nobilis) and Satranala (1 sp., S. decussilvae) are endemic to Madagascar, Medemia (1 sp., M. argun) is restricted to Egypt and Sudan, while Hyphaene (8 spp.) ranges from southern Africa and Madagascar to western India. In subtribe Lataniieae, only the male flowers are sunken in pits and the fruits are sessile, with 1-3 seeds. Lodoicea (1 sp., L. maldivica) is endemic to the Seychelles, Latania (3 spp.) is endemic to the Mascarene Islands, while Borassodendron has two species, one in Borneo (B. borneense) and one in the Malay Peninsula (B. machadonis). The last of the genera, Borassus (5 spp.), is the most widespread and is found in Sub-Saharan Africa, Madagascar, Southeast Asia and New Guinea. An extinct genus of the subtribe Hyphaeninae is known from the Maastrichtian aged Intertrappean Beds of India.

| Subtribe | Image | Genus | Species |
|---|---|---|---|
| Hyphaenieae | | Bismarckia Hildebr. & H.Wendl. | Bismarckia nobilis |
| Hyphaenieae | | Satranala Beentje & J.Dransf. | Satranala decussilvae |
| Hyphaenieae | | Medemia Wuert. ex H.Wendl. | Medemia argun |
| Hyphaenieae | | Hyphaene Gaertn. | Hyphaene compressa H.Wendl. - eastern Africa from Ethiopia to Mozambique; Hyphaene coriacea Gaertn. - eastern Africa from South Africa; Madagascar; Juan de Nova Island; Hyphaene dichotoma (J.White Dubl. ex Nimmo) Furtado - India, Sri Lanka; Hyphaene guineensis Schumach. & Thonn. - western and central Africa from Liberia to Angola; Hyphaene macrosperma H.Wendl. - Benin; Hyphaene petersiana Klotzsch ex Mart. - southern and eastern Africa from South Africa to Tanzania; Hyphaene reptans Becc. - Somalia, Kenya, Yemen; Hyphaene thebaica (L.) Mart. - northeastern, central and western Africa from Egypt to Somalia and west to Senegal and Mauritania; Middle East (Palestine, Israel, Saudi Arabia, Yemen) |
| Lataniieae | | Lodoicea Comm. ex DC. | Lodoicea maldivica, sea coconut, coco de mer, or double coconut |
| Lataniieae | | Latania Comm. ex Juss. | Latania loddigesii Mart. - (blue latan palm, latanier de l'Ile Ronde) from Mauritius; Latania lontaroides (Gaertn.) H.E.Moore - (red latan palm, latanier de la Réunion) from Réunion; Latania verschaffeltii Lem. - (yellow latan palm, latanier de Rodrigues) from Rodrigues Island |
| Lataniieae | | Borassodendron Becc. | Borassodendron borneense J.Dransf. - Borneo; Borassodendron machadonis (Ridl.) Becc. - southern Thailand, southern Myanmar, Peninsular Malaysia |
| Lataniieae | | Borassus L. | Borassus aethiopum - African palmyra palm, Rônier (and other names) (tropical Africa & Madagascar); Borassus akeassii - Ake Assi's palmyra palm (West and Central Africa); Borassus flabellifer - Asian palmyra palm/lontar palm/doub palm (southern Asia from India to Indonesia); Borassus heineanus - New Guinea palmyra palm (New Guinea); Borassus madagascariensis - Madagascar palmyra palm (Madagascar) |

== Conservation ==
Many species in tribe Borasseae are threatened with extinction (36% of total recognized species):

- Borassodendron machadonis – Vulnerable
- Borassus madagascariensis – Endangered
- Latania loddigesii – Endangered
- Latania lontaroides – Endangered
- Latania verschaffeltii – Endangered
- Lodoicea maldivica – Endangered
- Medemia argun – Vulnerable
- Satranala decussilvae – Endangered

== Gallery ==
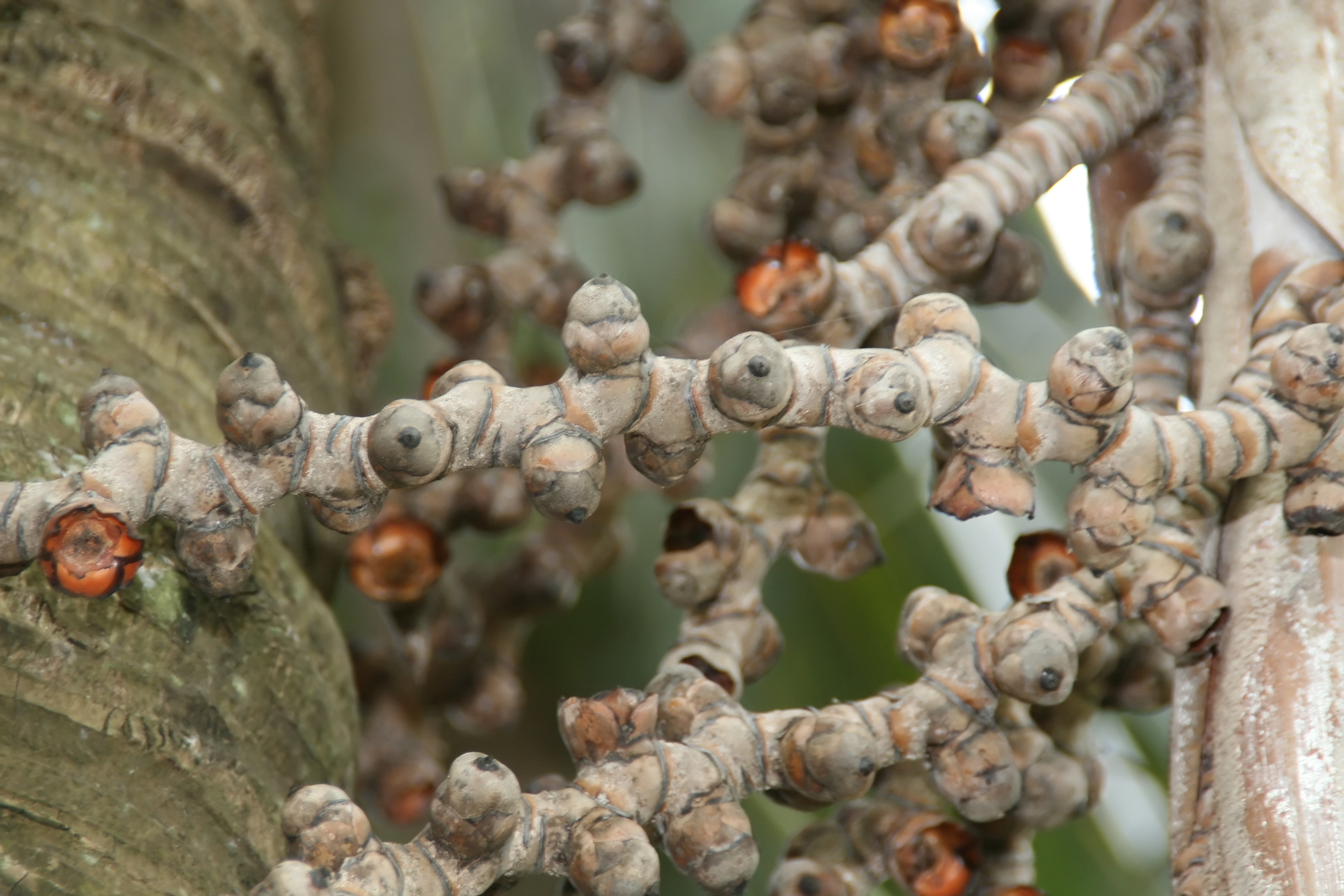
Female flowers of Latania loddigesii

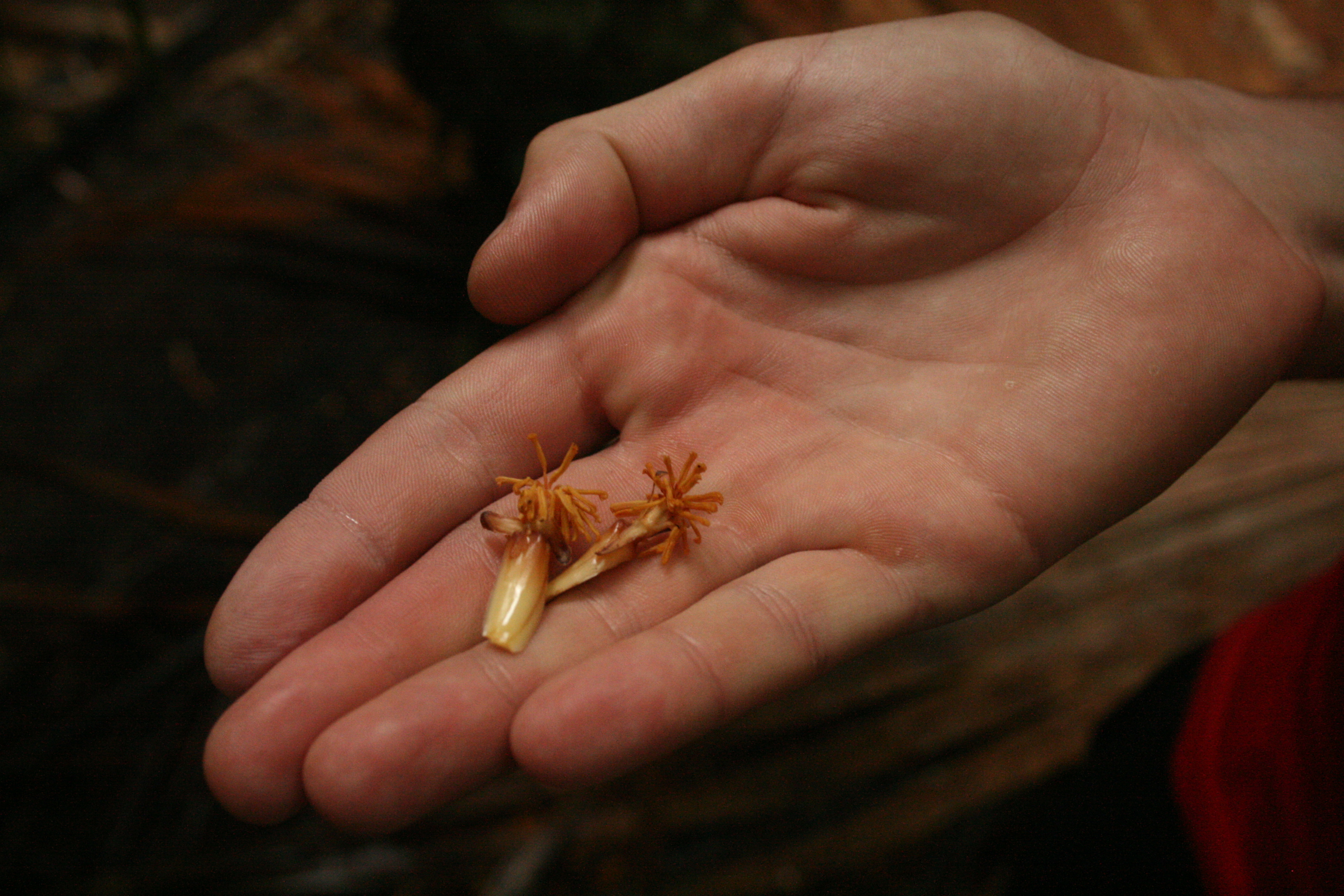
Male flowers of Lodoicea maldivica

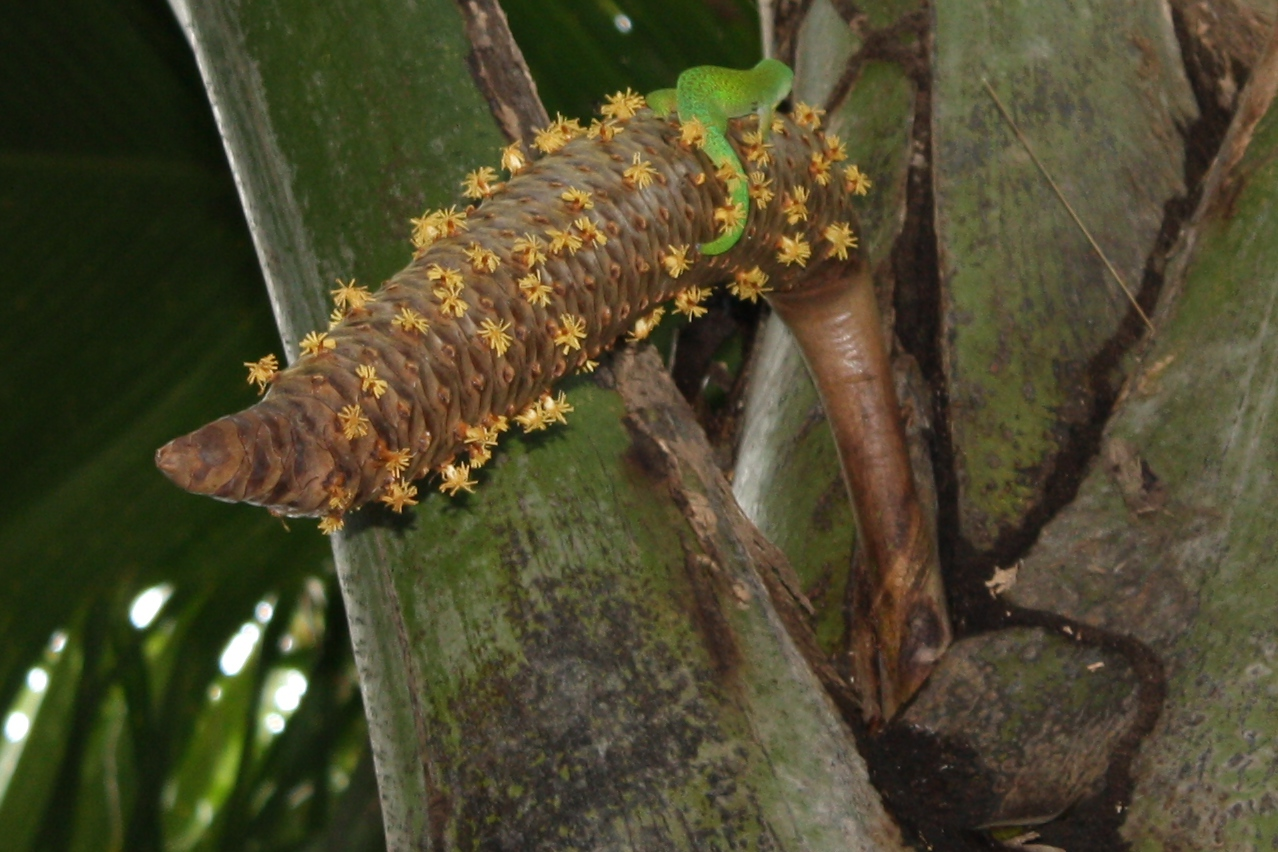
Male flowers of Lodoicea maldivica emerging from catkin-like inflorescence

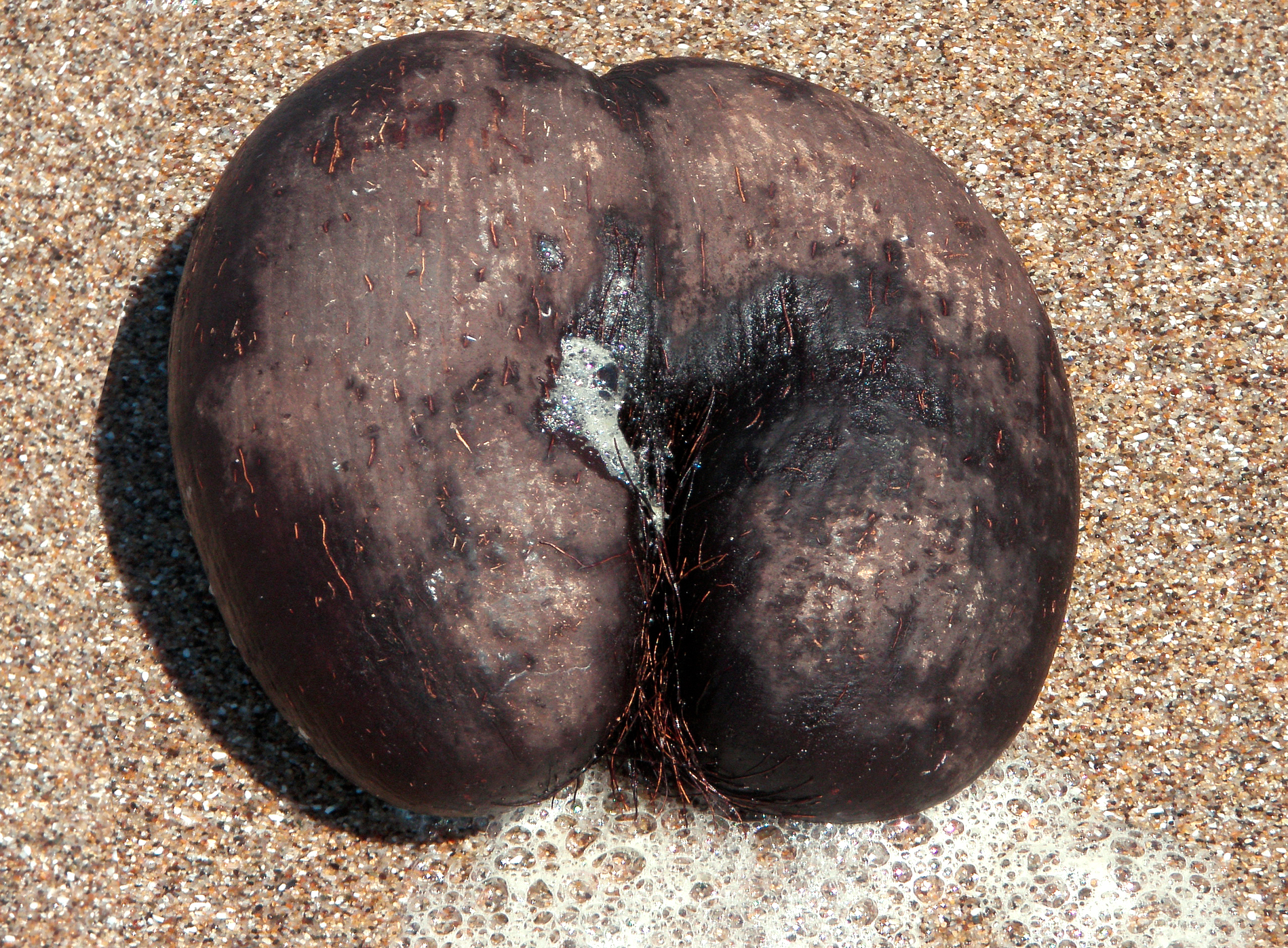
Seed of Lodoicea maldivica, the world's largest seed

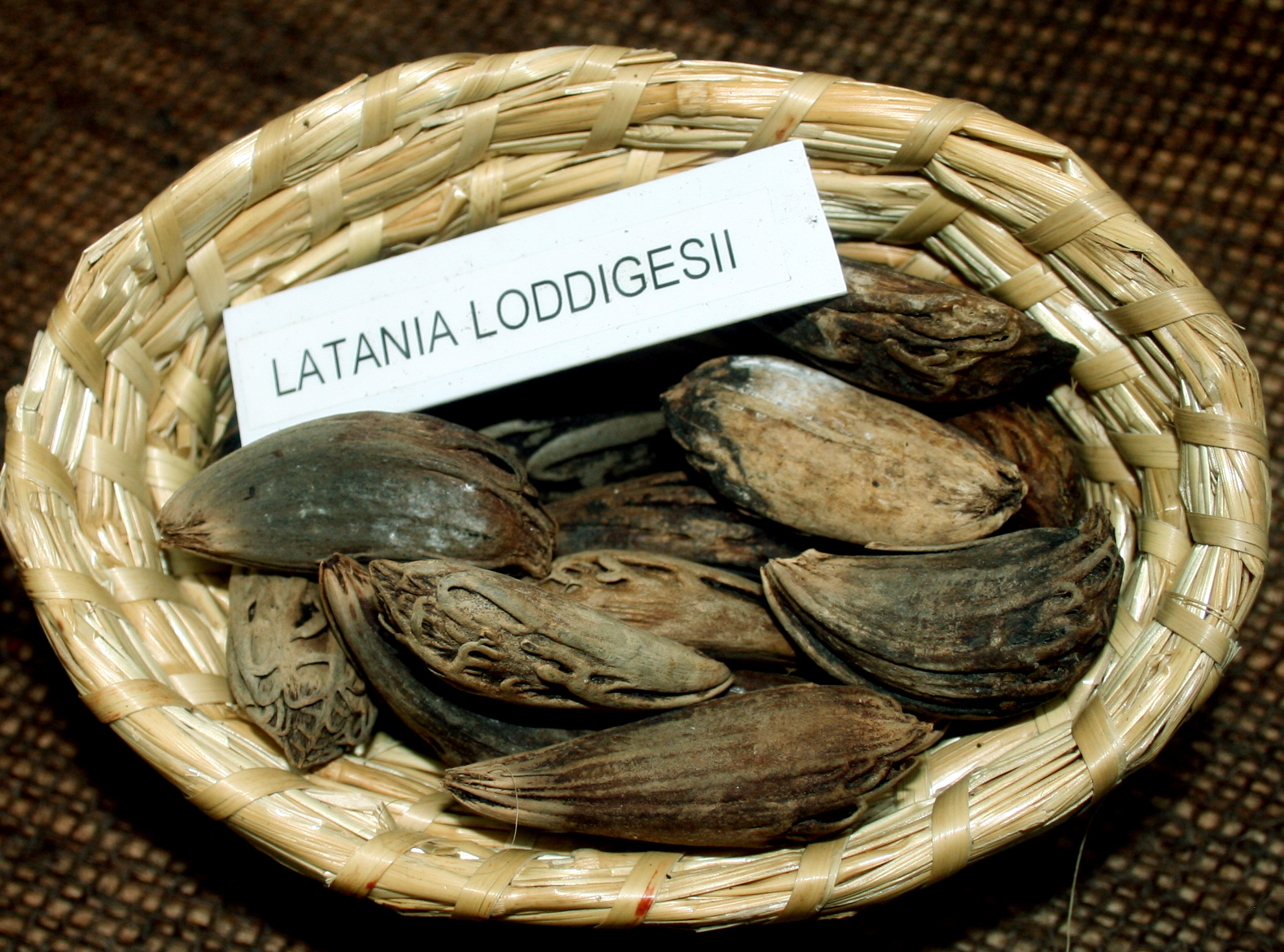
Seed of Latania are the smallest in the tribe

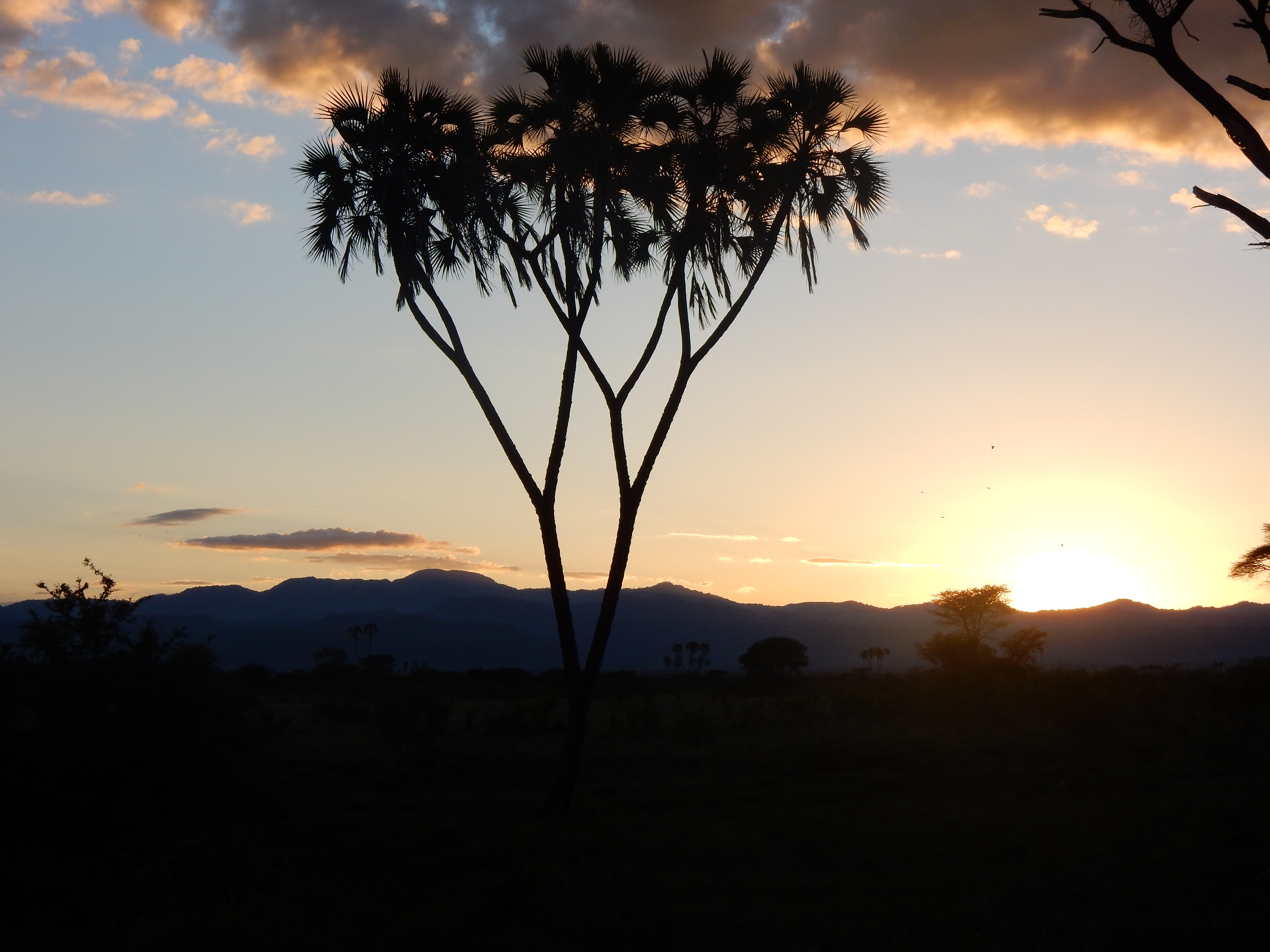
Unlike most Borasseae, Hyphaene species often have branching stems (this is H. compressa)

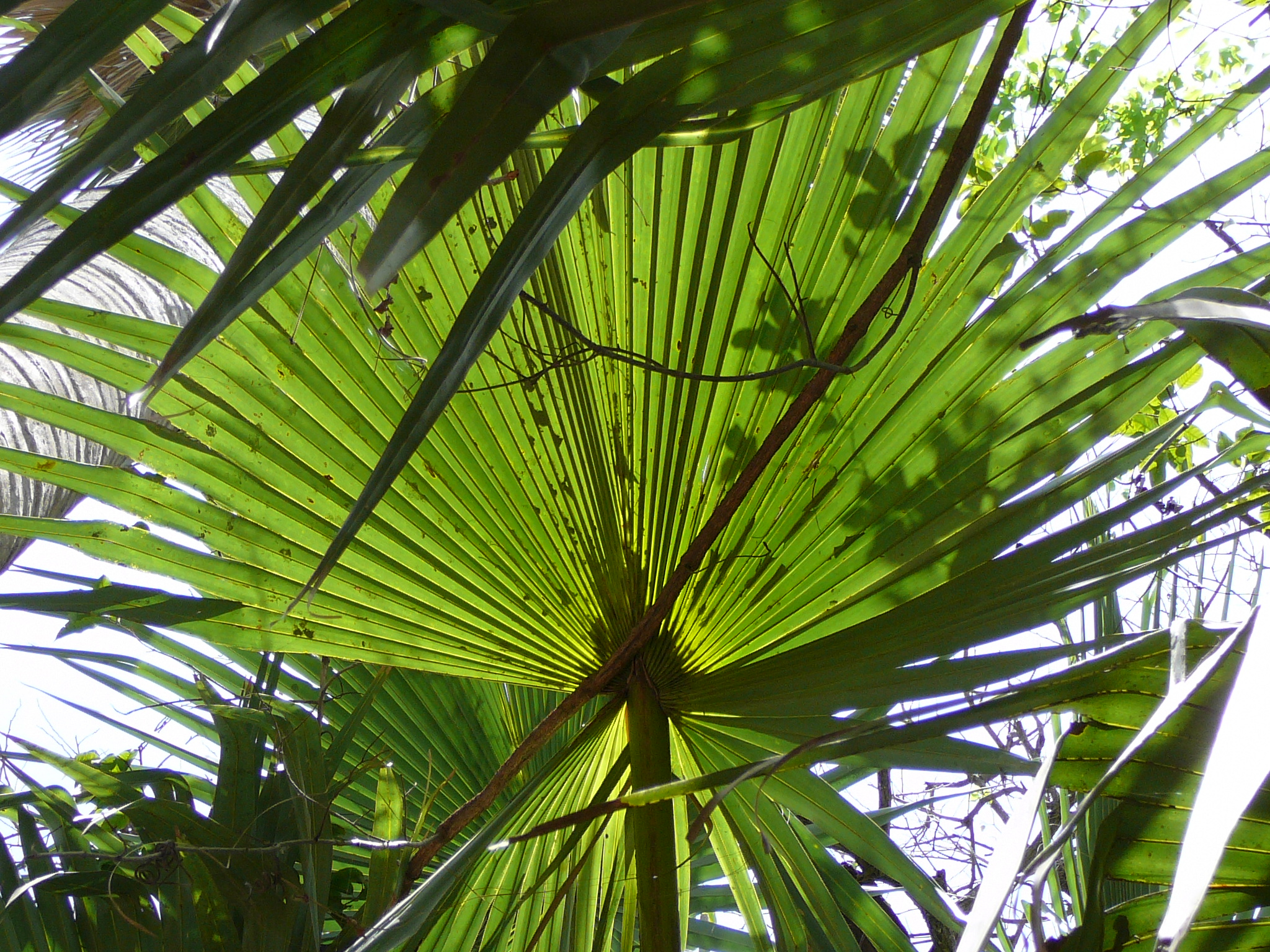
All Borasseae have palmate leaves, as with this Borassus aethiopum

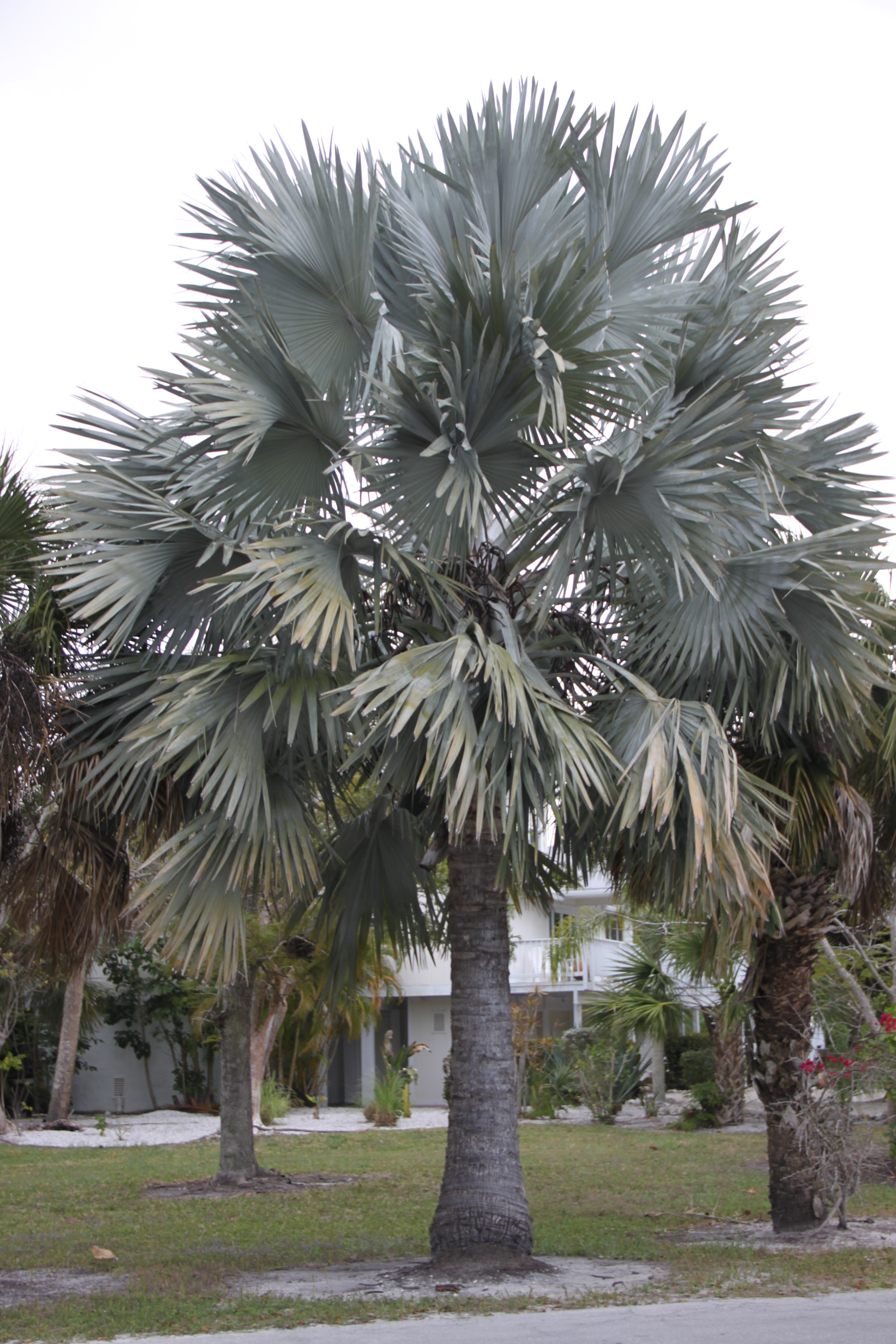
The silvery leaves of Bismarckia nobilis make it a popular palm in cultivation

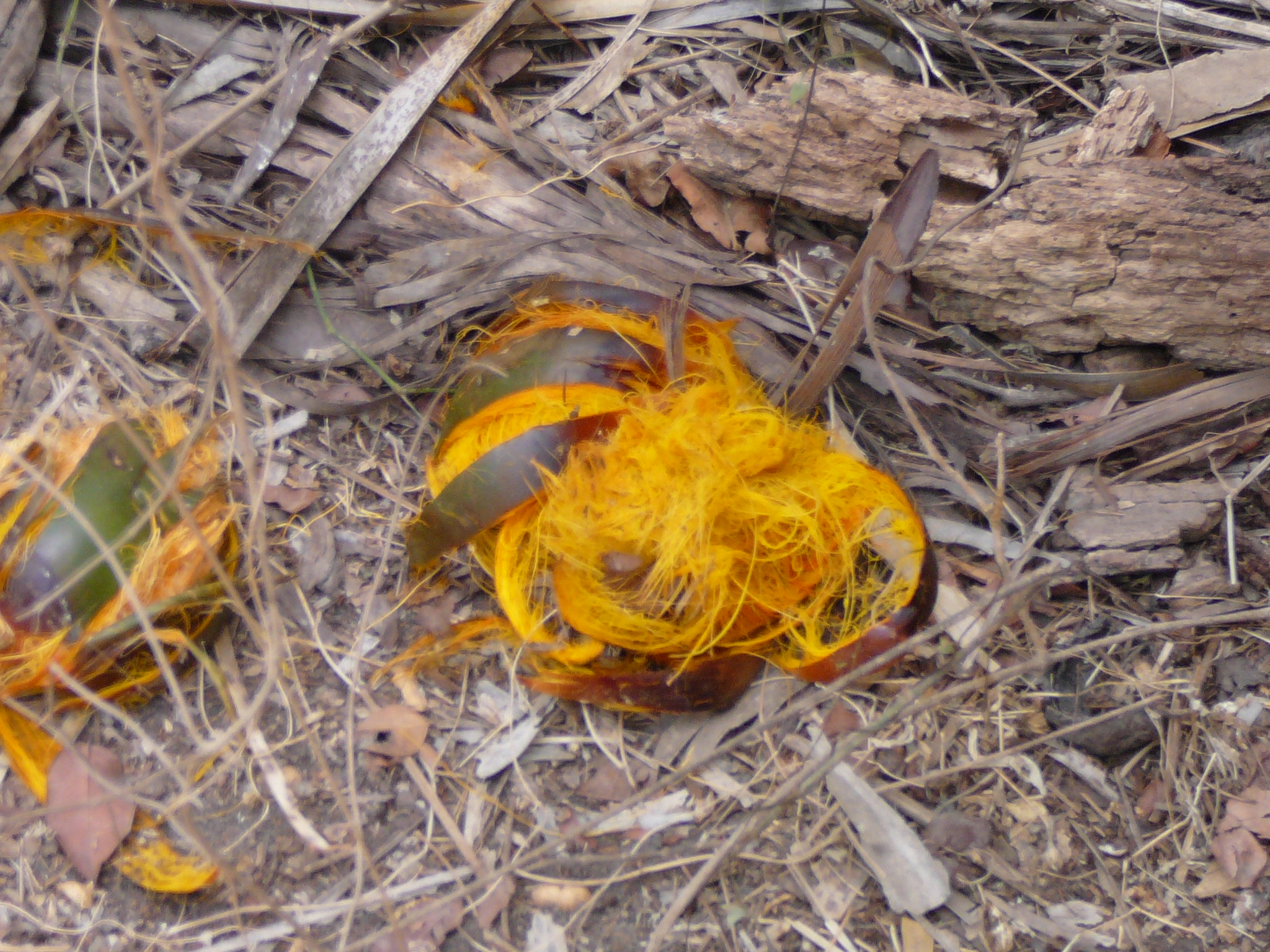
Borassus fruits are large and fleshy, with 1-3 seeds (this is B. aethiopum)

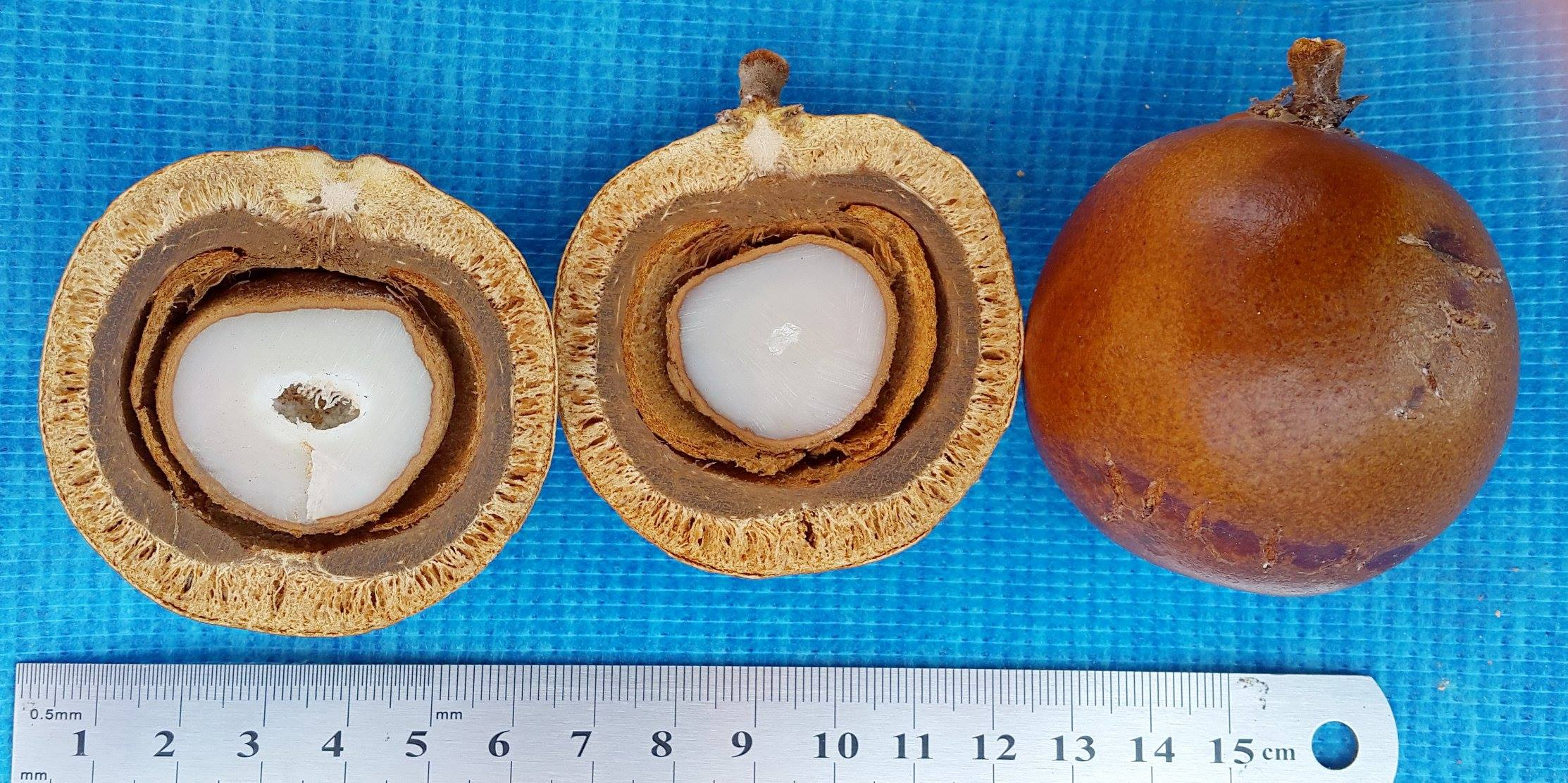
Hyphaene fruits have a dry, cake-like flesh and a single seed (this is H. petersiana

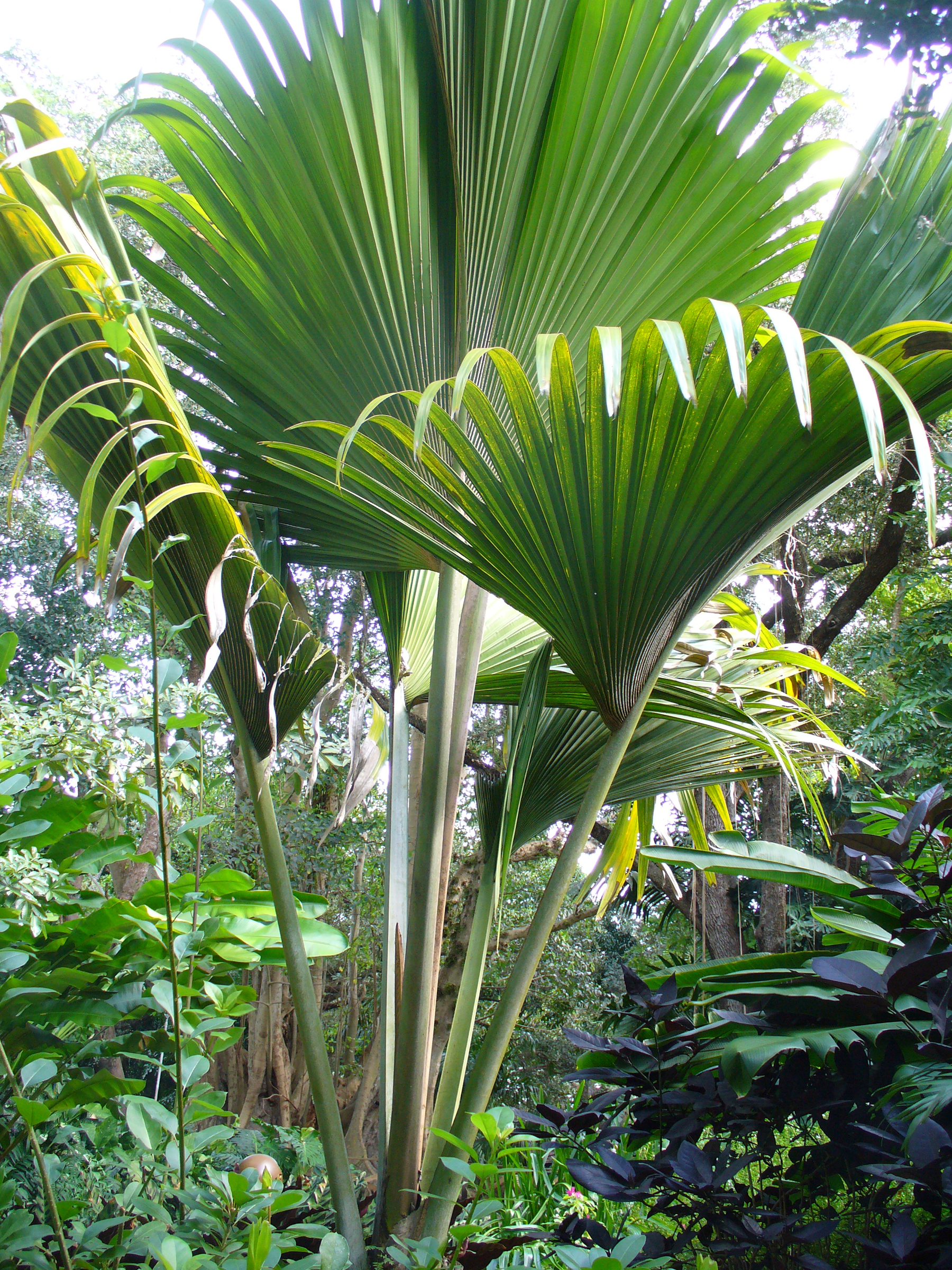
The massive leaves of Lodoicea maldivica are some of the largest palmate leaves in the family

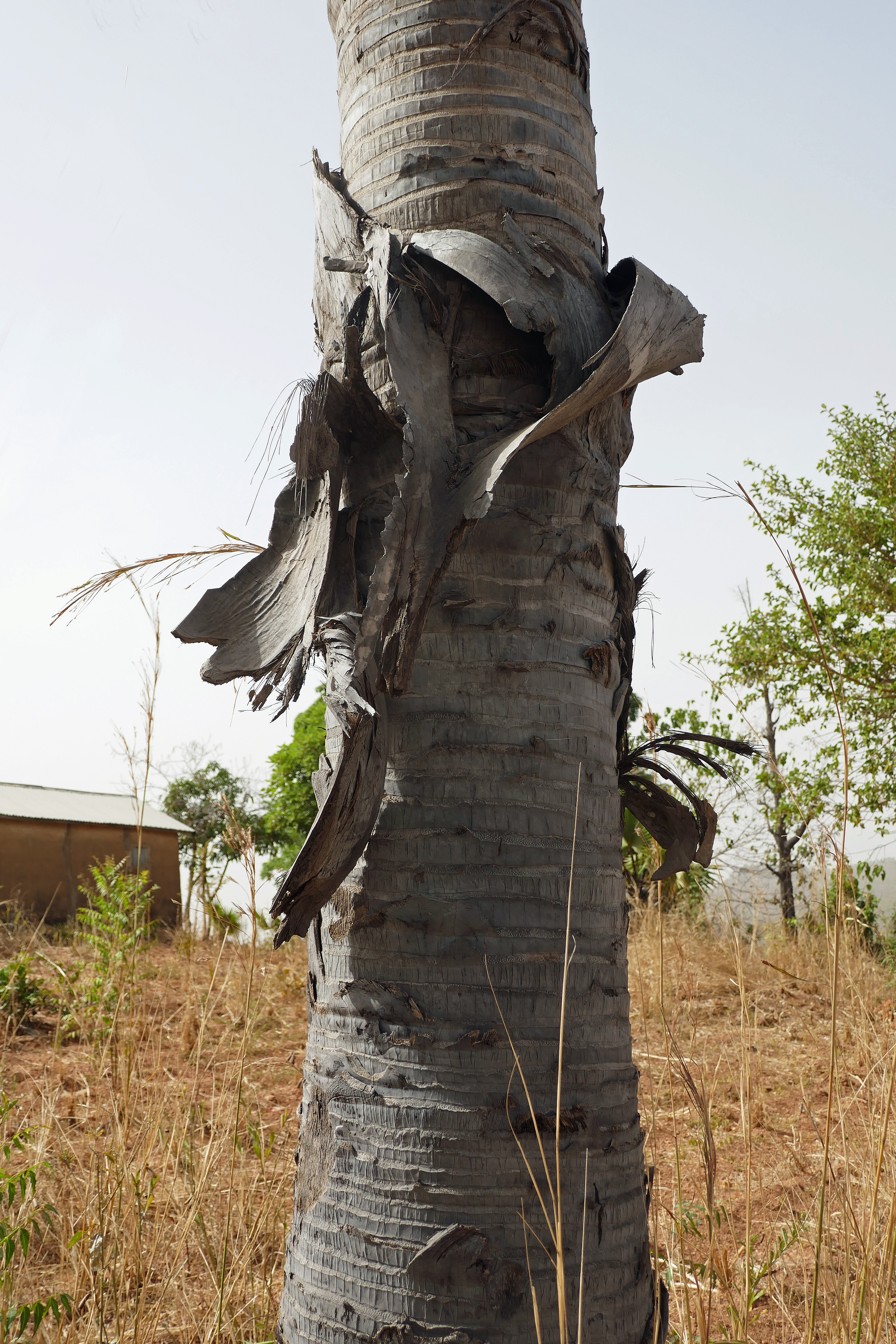
Leaf scars on the trunk of Borassus aethiopum are revealed as the leaf sheaths fall off
