= Hyphaenieae =

Scientific classification
- Kingdom: Plantae
- Clade: Tracheophytes
- Clade: Angiosperms
- Clade: Monocots
- Clade: Commelinids
- Order: Arecales
- Family: Arecaceae
- Subfamily: Coryphoideae
- Tribe: Borasseae
- Subtribe: Hyphaenieae

Tribe of palms

Hyphaenieae is a subtribe of plants in the family Arecaceae found mostly in Madagascar and mainland Africa. Genera in the subtribe, all of which are monotypic, are:

- Bismarckia – W Madagascar
- Satranala – NE Madagascar
- Hyphaene – Africa, Indian Ocean
- Medemia – Upper Nile (Sudan, Egypt)

== See also ==
- List of Arecaceae genera
