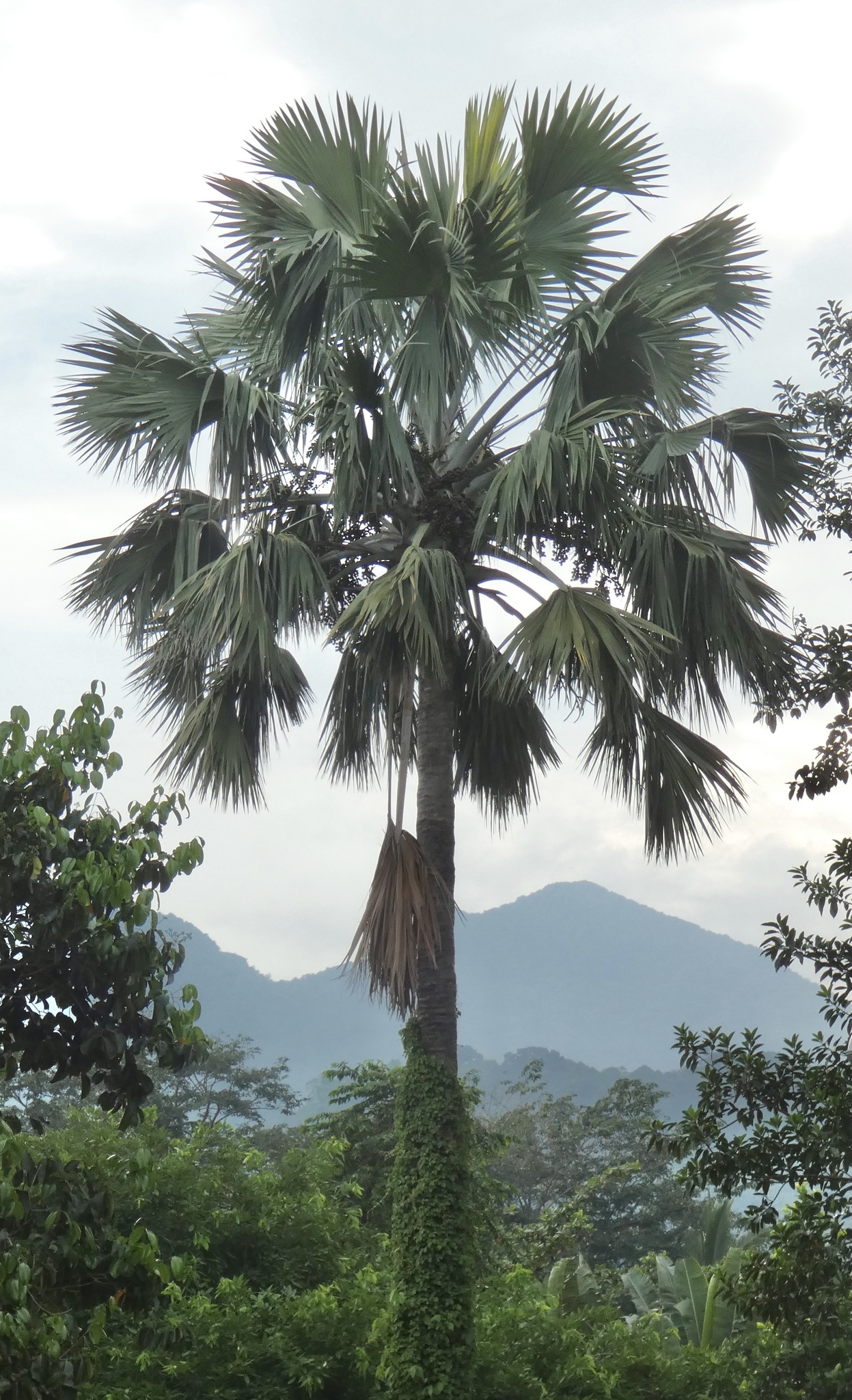
- ‘Borassus flabellifer’

Scientific classification
- Kingdom: Plantae
- Clade: Tracheophytes
- Clade: Angiosperms
- Clade: Monocots
- Clade: Commelinids
- Order: Arecales
- Family: Arecaceae
- Subfamily: Coryphoideae
- Tribe: Borasseae
- Subtribe: Lataniieae

= Lataniieae =

Tribe of palms

Lataniieae is a subtribe of plants in the family Arecaceae. Genera in the subtribe are:

- Latania – Mascarenes
- Lodoicea – Seychelles
- Borassodendron – Malay Peninsula, Borneo
- Borassus – Africa and Asia

== See also ==
- List of Arecaceae genera
