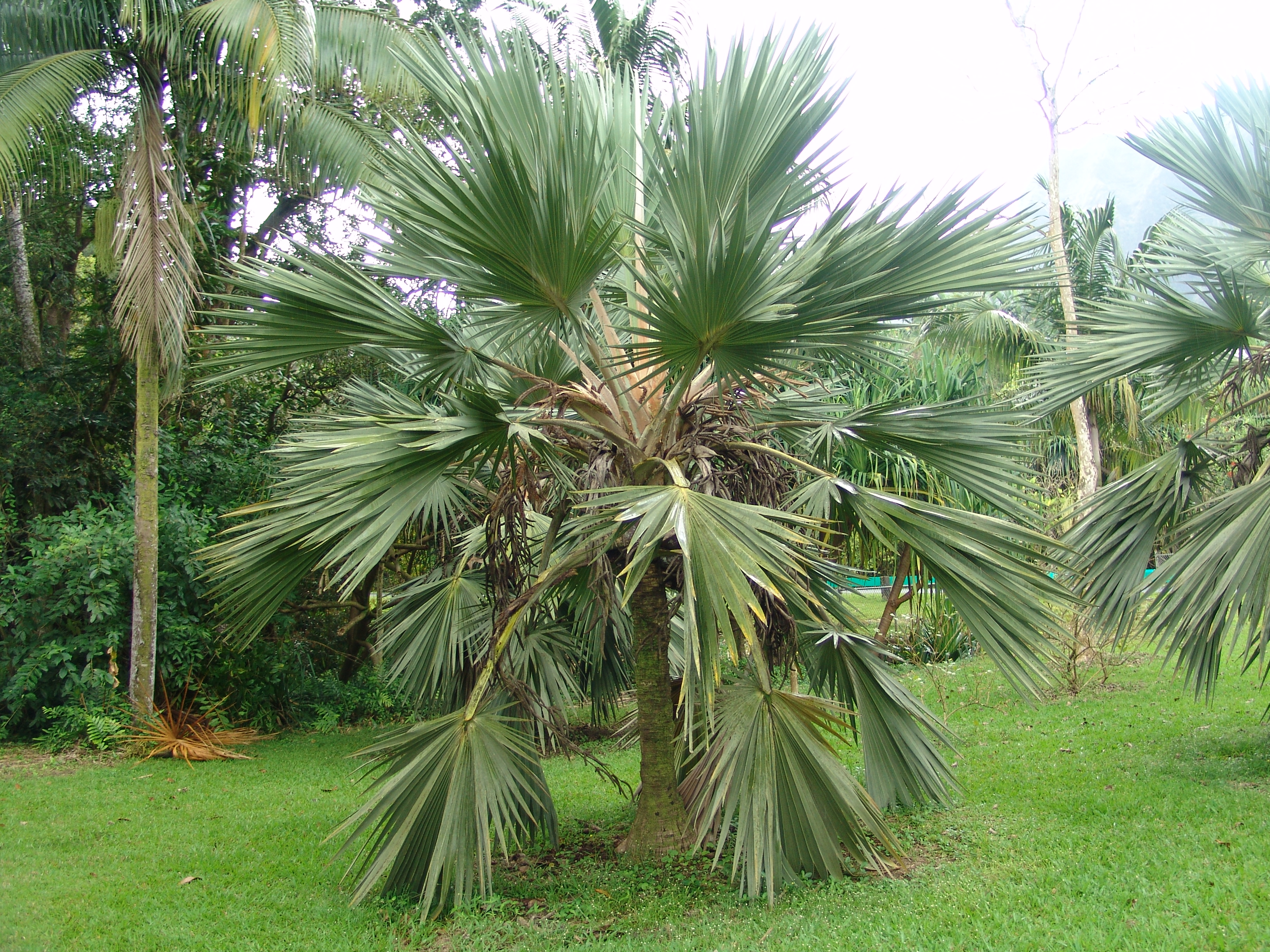

Conservation status
- Endangered (IUCN 2.3)

Scientific classification
- Kingdom: Plantae
- Clade: Tracheophytes
- Clade: Angiosperms
- Clade: Monocots
- Clade: Commelinids
- Order: Arecales
- Family: Arecaceae
- Genus: Latania
- Species: L. loddigesii

Binomial name
- Latania loddigesii Martius

= Latania loddigesii =

Species of palm

Latania loddigesii is a species of palm tree. The species is named in honor of Joachim Loddiges. It is endemic to Mauritius, where the only remaining populations are located on the offshore islands. It is also grown as an ornamental plant. Its common names include latanier de l'Ile Ronde and latanier de Maurice.

== Gallery ==
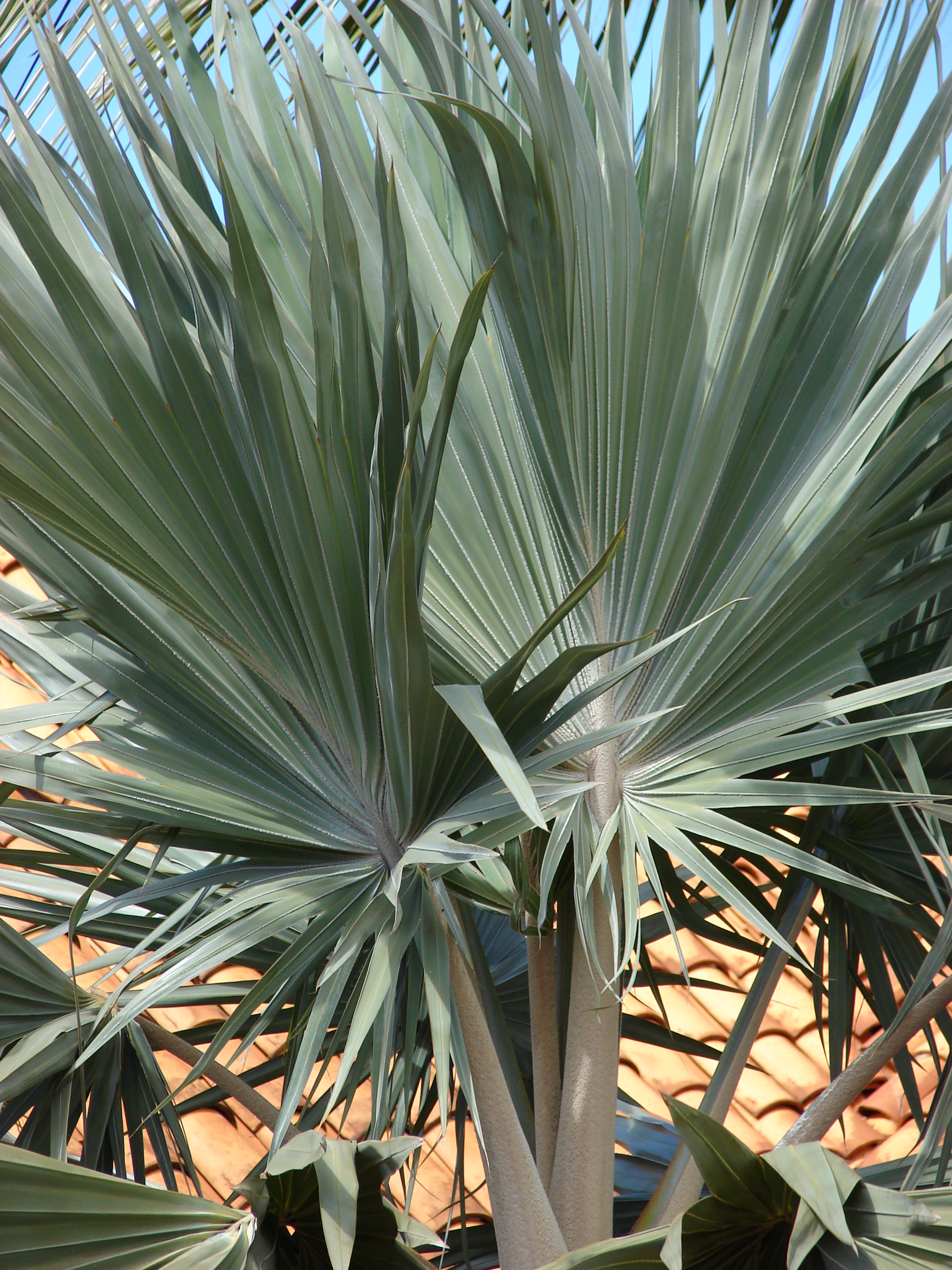
Leaves

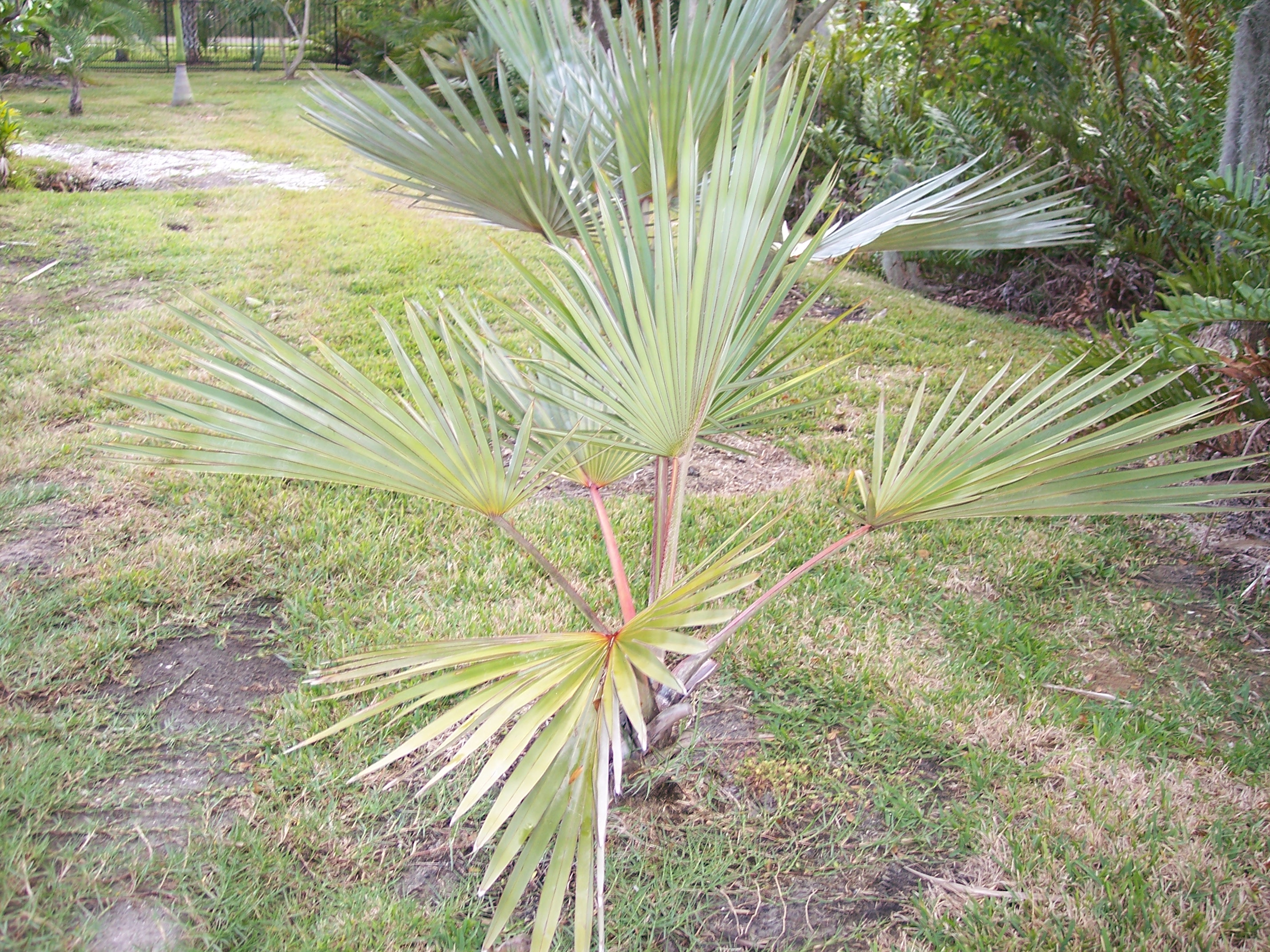
Young plant: note red veining

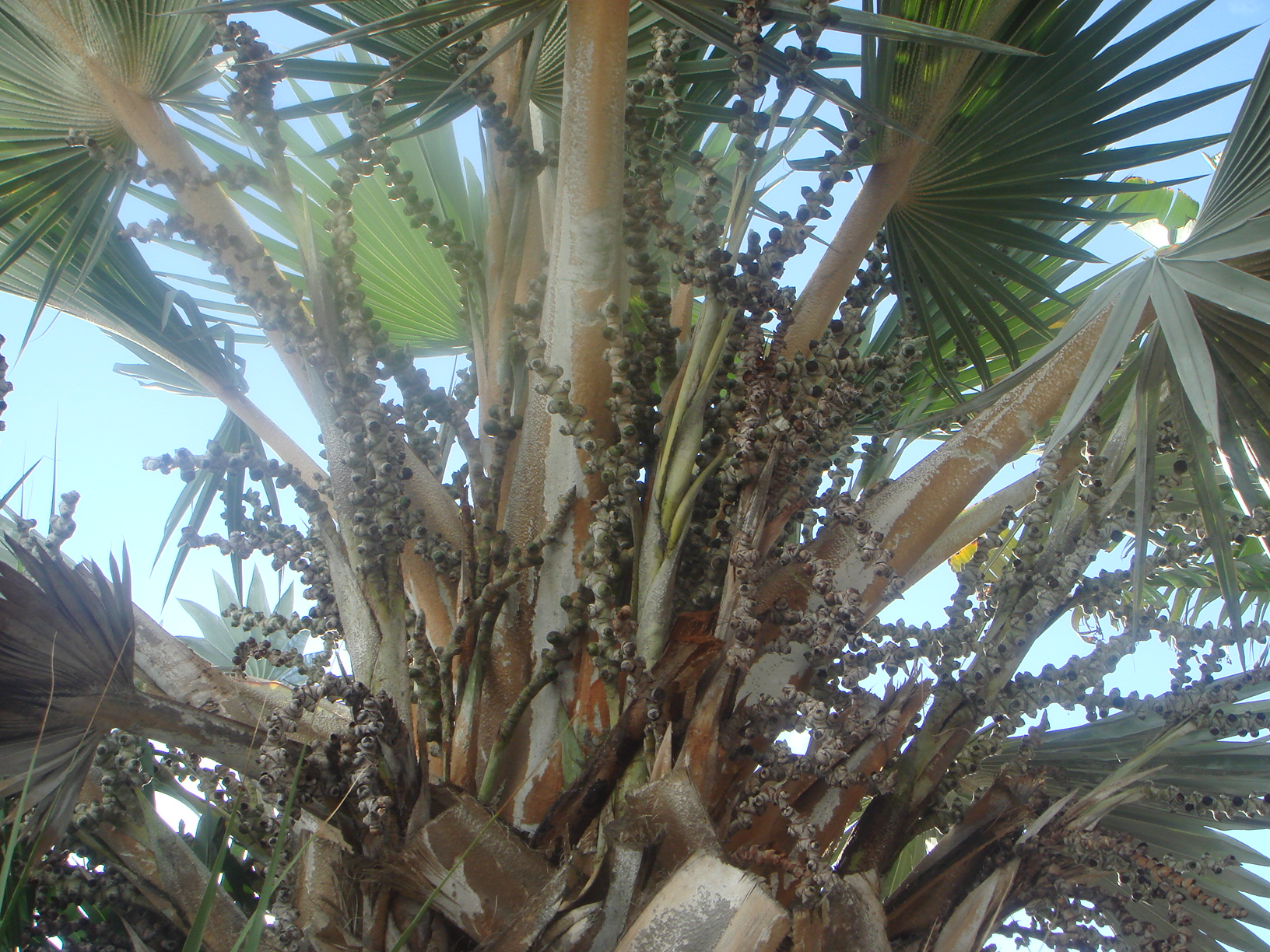
Crown and fruit

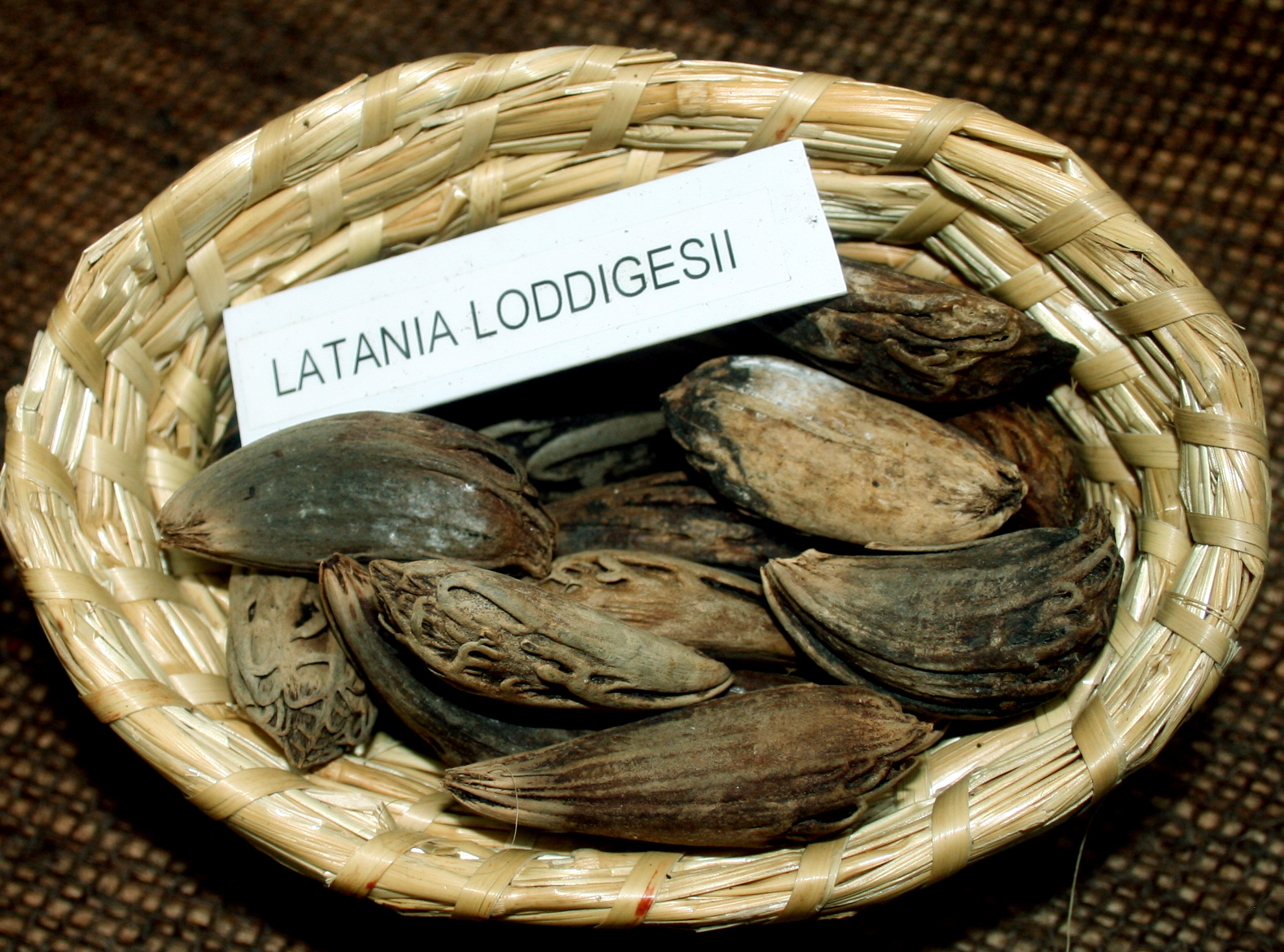
Seeds
