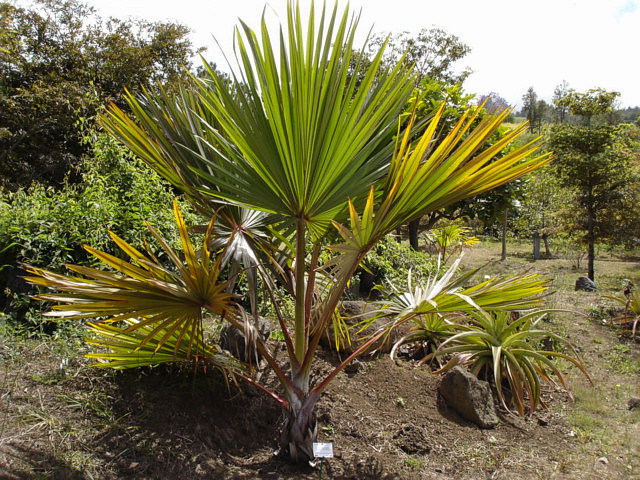

Conservation status
- Endangered (IUCN 2.3)

Scientific classification
- Kingdom: Plantae
- Clade: Tracheophytes
- Clade: Angiosperms
- Clade: Monocots
- Clade: Commelinids
- Order: Arecales
- Family: Arecaceae
- Genus: Latania
- Species: L. lontaroides

Binomial name
- Latania lontaroides (Gaertn.) H.E.Moore

Synonyms
- Cleophora commersonii (J.F.Gmel.) O.F.Cook; Cleophora lontaroides Gaertn.; Latania borbonica Lam.; Latania commersonii J.F.Gmel.; Latania plagicoma Comm. ex Balf.f., not validly publ.; Latania rubra Jacq.; Latania vera Voss, pro syn.; Livistona borbonica (Lam.) B.S.Williams

= Latania lontaroides =

Species of palm tree

Latania lontaroides is a species of palm tree. It is endemic to Réunion. It is also used as an ornamental plant. Its common names include the Red Latan, latanier de la Réunion, and latanier rouge. The armored scale insect Hemiberlesia lataniae was first described from this species of palm, and has since spread around the world and proved to be a serious pest of avocado.

This palm was common on Réunion at one time, but the area in which it grows has diminished as land has been cleared for agriculture and for other purposes. The International Union for Conservation of Nature has assessed it as being an endangered species in the wild, however it is also grown as an ornamental plant in various parts of the world.

== Gallery ==
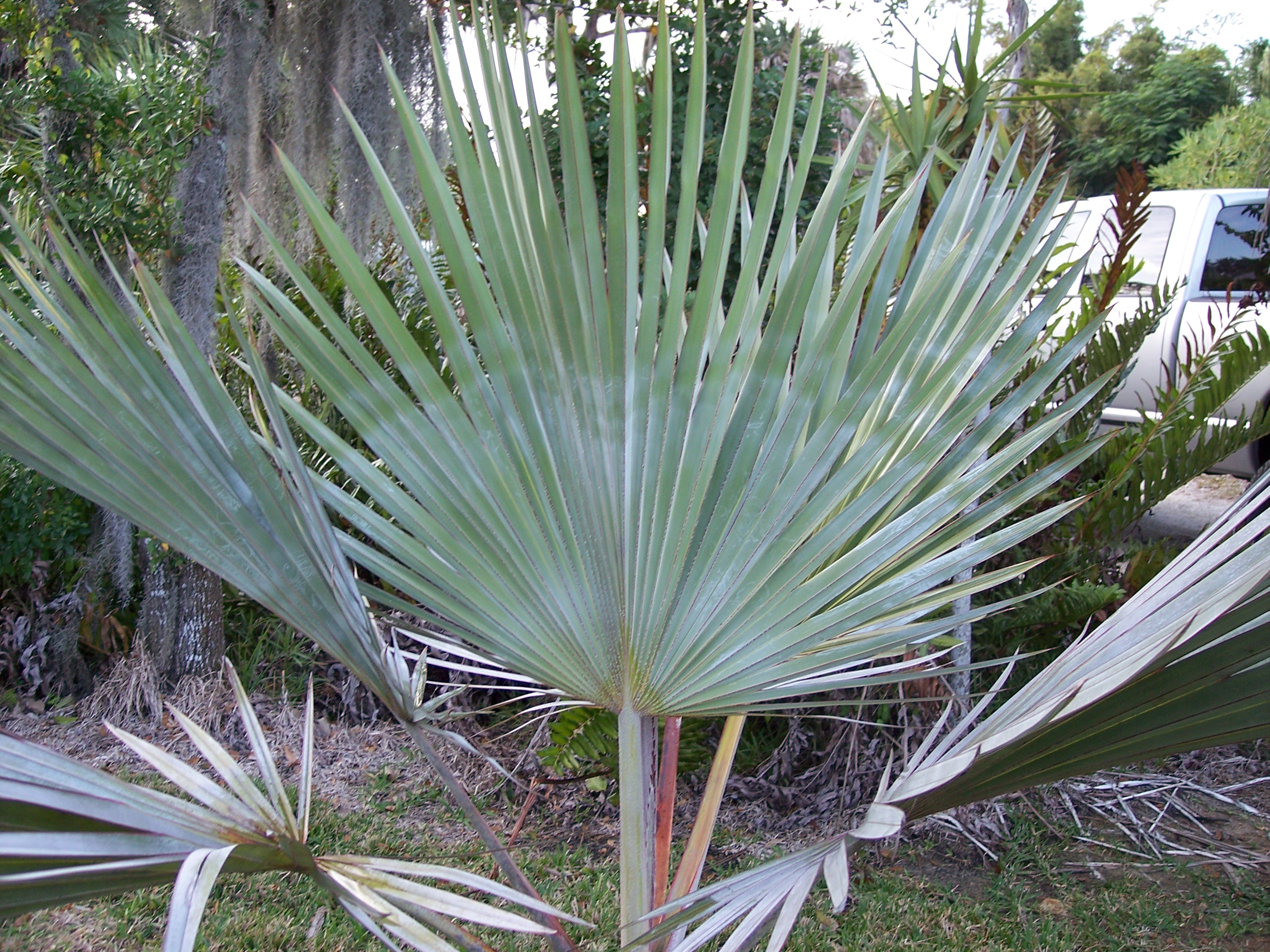
Form

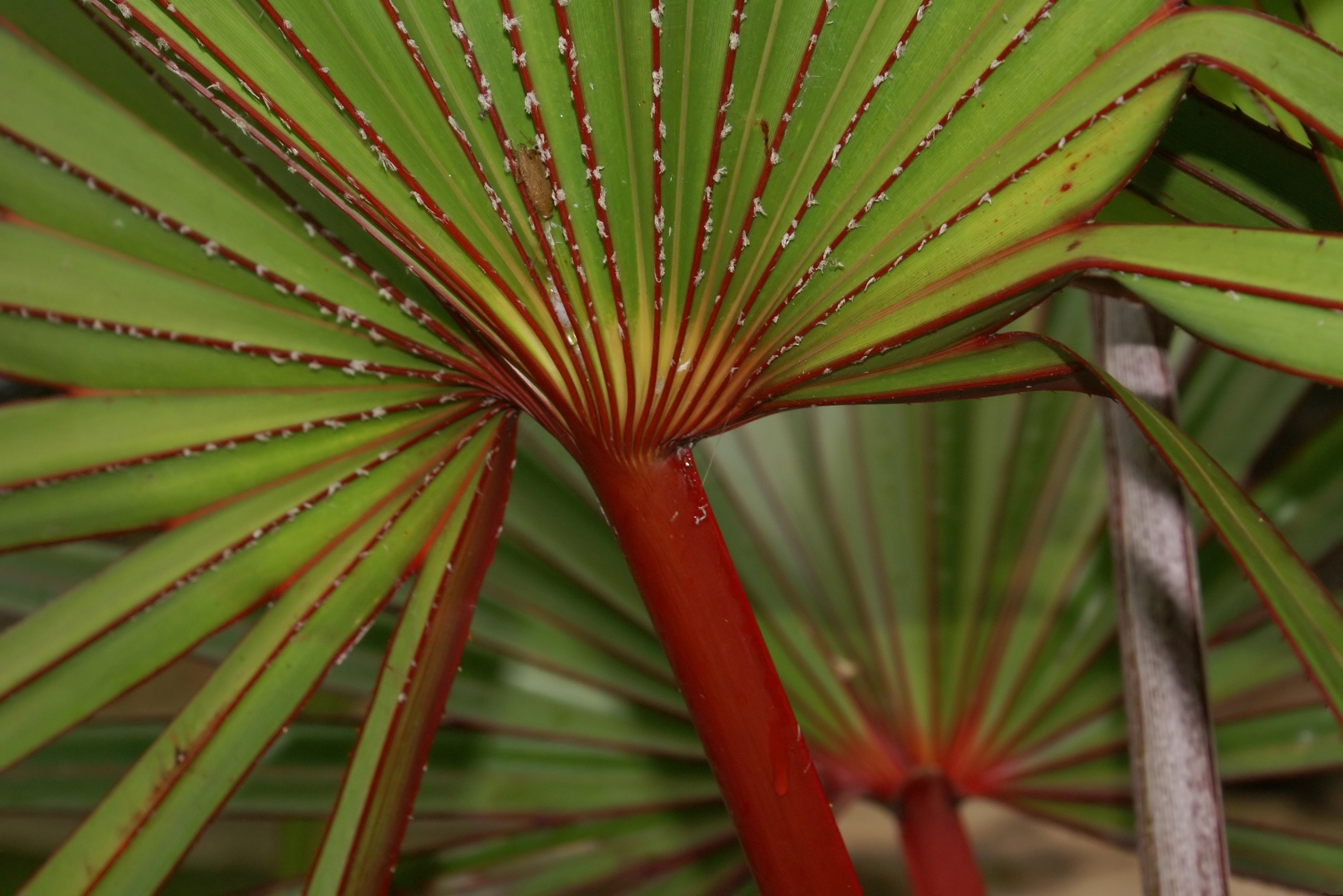
Leaf

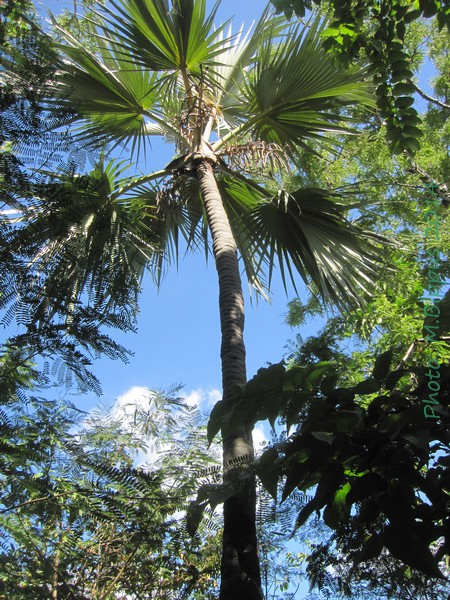
One of the few remaining in the wild in La Possession (male)
