= Borassus madagascariensis =

Conservation status
- Endangered (IUCN 3.1)

Scientific classification
- Kingdom: Plantae
- Clade: Embryophytes
- Clade: Tracheophytes
- Clade: Angiosperms
- Clade: Monocots
- Clade: Commelinids
- Order: Arecales
- Family: Arecaceae
- Genus: Borassus
- Species: B. madagascariensis

Binomial name
- Borassus madagascariensis (Jum. & H.Perrier) Bojer ex. Jum. & H.Perrier

Synonyms
- Borassus flabellifer var. madagascariensis Jum. & H.Perrier

Species of plant

Borassus madagascariensis is a species in the palm family Arecales endemic to Madagascar.

The palm is native to western Madagascar, where it is found along lowland watercourses in the dry forests below 100 meters (330 ft) elevation. It has a fragmented distribution and is known from only five locations.

The palm heart and newly germinated seedlings are edible, and an alcoholic drink is produced from the fruit.

== Description ==
This species has a trunk reaching up to 25 m (82 ft) in height, typically swollen, and up to 80 cm in diameter. The crown bears 16–23 leaves. Petioles and sheaths measure 170–237 cm (67–93 in) in length and 7.8–9.2 cm in width at the midpoint, robust and yellow-green throughout. Margins bear small serrate black teeth, 0.1–0.85 cm long, with spines continuing along the first leaflet. The costa extends 77–82 cm. The adaxial hastula is prominent, up to 1.5 cm, whereas the abaxial hastula is rudimentary. The leaf lamina can reach a radius of 100 cm, with immature leaves showing dense indumentum on the ribs. Each leaf has 102–132 leaflets, 4.2–7.9 cm wide, with acute apices that remain entire or split longitudinally with age. The shortest leaflets measure 68–83 cm in length, with leaf divisions extending 61–83 cm. Commissural veins number 10–14 per cm, and the leaf anatomy is isolateral.

Staminate inflorescences are branched up to two orders, with the upper branches terminating in 1–3 rachillae. The rachillae are green-brown, catkin-like, 30–44 cm long, 2.3–3.3 cm in diameter, typically with a mamilliform apex. Rachilla bracts form pits containing a cincinnus of 8–12 staminate flowers. Pistillate inflorescences are spicate, with a flower-bearing portion 76–90 cm long, bearing 7–15 flowers arranged spirally. Staminate flowers are 0.4–0.7 cm long, emerging individually from pits. Bracteoles measure 0.8 × 0.5 cm; the calyx is 0.5 × 0.2 cm and shallowly divided into three sepals; petals are 0.2 × 0.1 cm. Flowers have six stamens with very short filaments (0.02 × 0.04 cm) and anthers 0.14 × 0.1 cm; the pistillode is minute. Pollen is monosulcate, elliptical, 46–65 μm long, with an aperture 38–52 μm long and a polar axis of 42–54 μm. The tectum is perforate and sparsely covered with supratectal gemmae.

Pistillate flowers are 3.5 × 3 cm, with bracteoles 2 cm in diameter, sepals 2 × 2 cm, and petals 1.5 × 1.5 cm. Fruits are large, ovoid, 25–35 × 7–18.5 cm, with a somewhat pointed apex, fragrant, and yellowish green at maturity. They develop inside persistent perianth segments. Pyrenes number 1–2 (rarely 3), measuring 8.7–12.1 × 8.3–12.3 × 6.3–7.5 cm, unlobed or slightly bilobed. Some pyrenes have one or two external longitudinal furrows. Internal flanges are absent, though an external longitudinal crest is often present.
