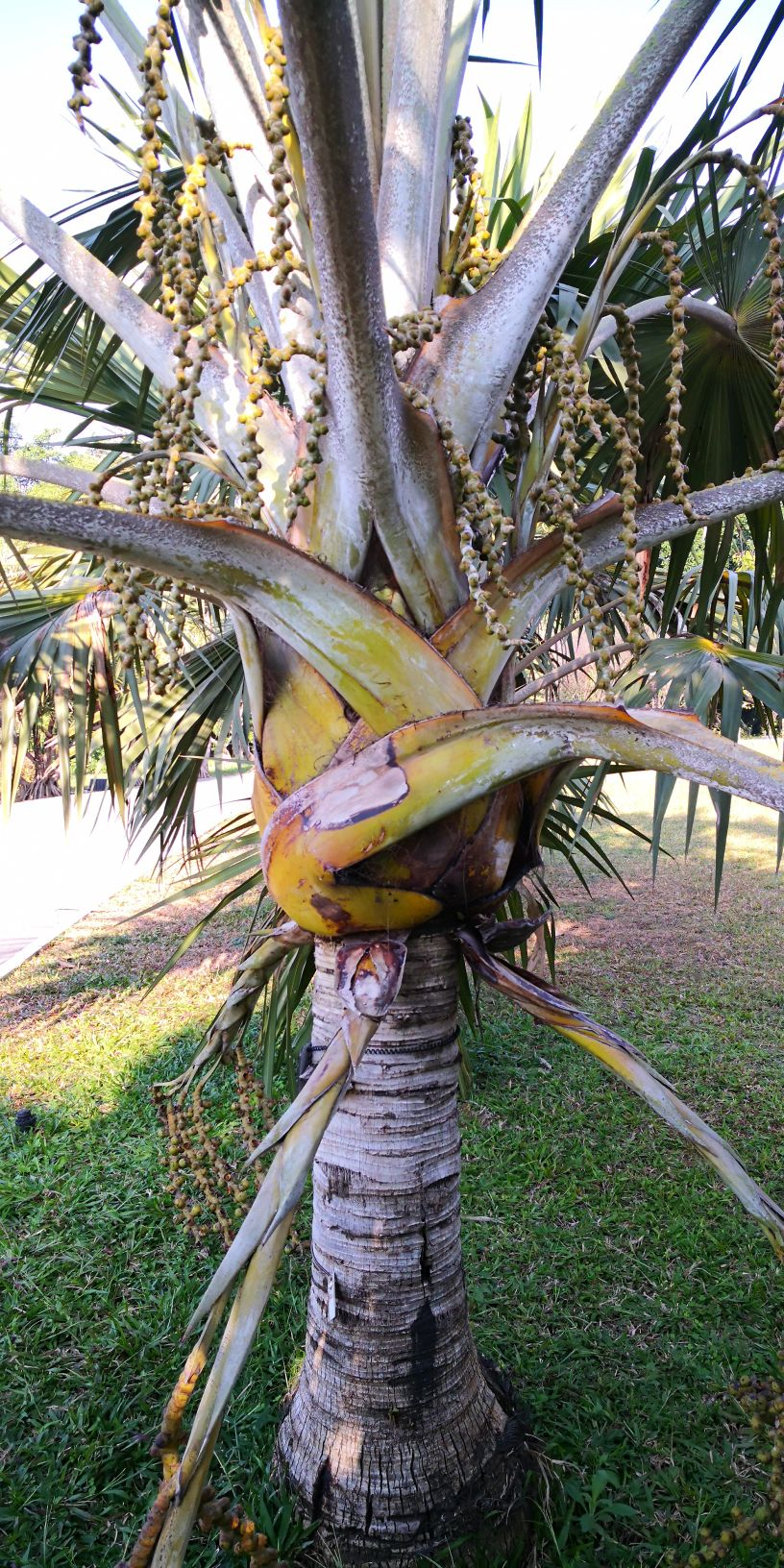

Conservation status
- Critically Endangered (IUCN 3.1)

Scientific classification
- Kingdom: Plantae
- Clade: Tracheophytes
- Clade: Angiosperms
- Clade: Monocots
- Clade: Commelinids
- Order: Arecales
- Family: Arecaceae
- Genus: Latania
- Species: L. verschaffeltii

Binomial name
- Latania verschaffeltii Lemaire

Synonyms
- Cleophora verschaffeltii (Lem.) O.F.Cook

= Latania verschaffeltii =

Species of palm

Latania verschaffeltii, the yellow latan palm, is a species of flowering plant in the family Arecaceae. It is found only on Rodrigues Island in the Indian Ocean, part of the Republic of Mauritius, 560 km east of the Island of Mauritius. It is, however, cultivated in other places as an ornamental. In the wild, the species is threatened by habitat loss.
