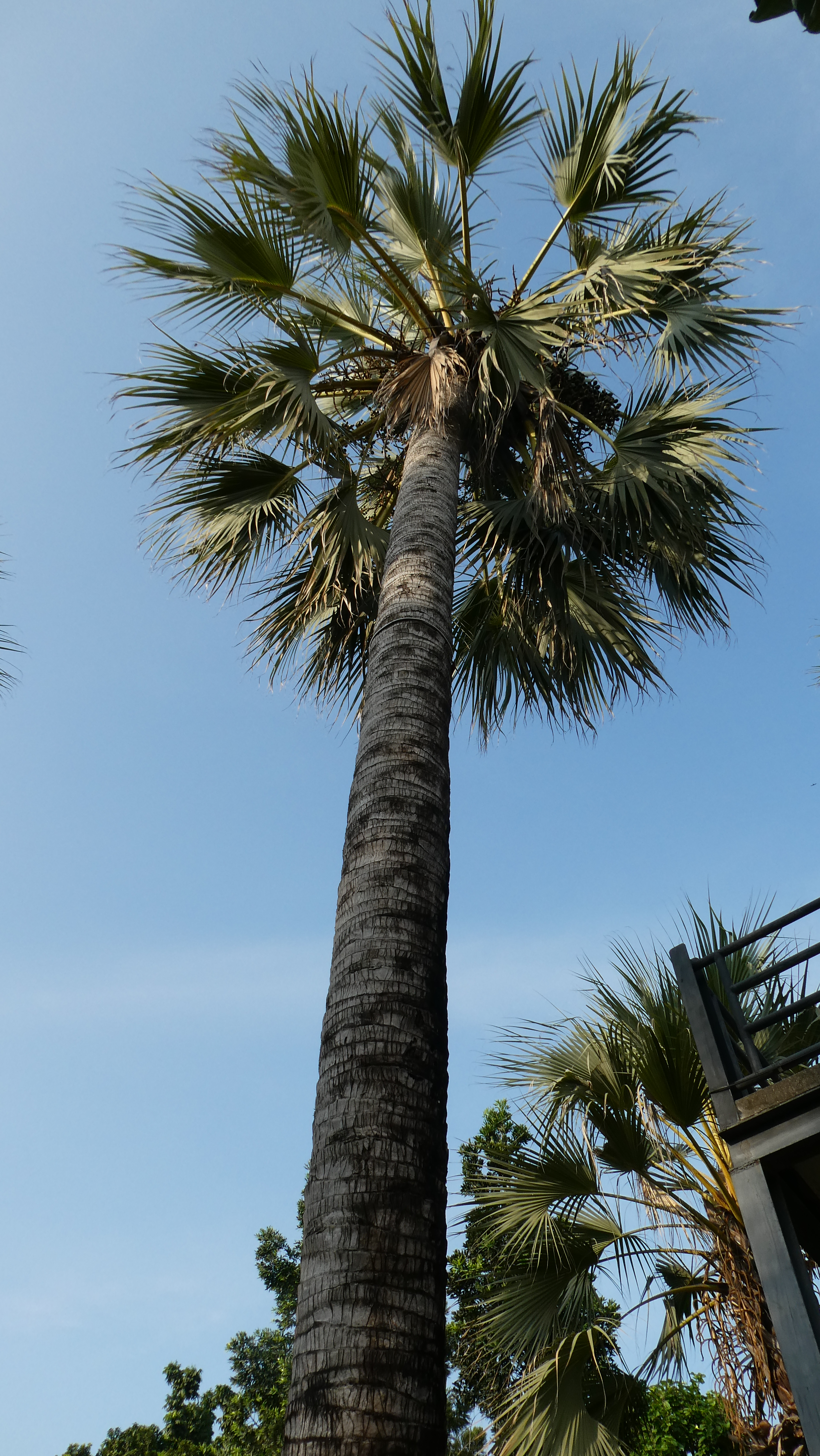

Conservation status
- Vulnerable (IUCN 3.1)

Scientific classification
- Kingdom: Plantae
- Clade: Tracheophytes
- Clade: Angiosperms
- Clade: Monocots
- Clade: Commelinids
- Order: Arecales
- Family: Arecaceae
- Subfamily: Coryphoideae
- Tribe: Borasseae
- Genus: Medemia; Wuert. ex H.Wendl.
- Species: M. argun

Binomial name
- Medemia argun (Mart.) Wuert. ex H.Wendl.

Synonyms
- Hyphaene argun Mart.; Areca passalacquae Kunth; Medemia abiadensis H.Wendl.

= Medemia =

Species of plant

Medemia argun is a rare species of the palm tree family (Arecaceae) native to Egypt and Sudan. It is the only species in the genus Medemia. The palm's dried dates have been found in ancient Egyptian tombs.

== Description ==
Medemia argun is a robust, solitary-stemmed, dioecious palm up to 10 m (33 ft) tall with fan leaves forming a dense rounded crown. It grows in extreme desert conditions. It is typically found in dry river beds in which ground water is likely to occur.

== Distribution ==
Medemia argun is found only in oases inside of the Nubian Desert, in southern Egypt and northern Sudan. The global population is divided in several sub-populations, with the most important (>90%) part of the population occurring in northern Sudan. The global population of Medemia argun was estimated at 7,400 individuals in the middle of the 2000s. In Egypt, only 32 individuals were counted at Dungul Oases in 2007 (Ibrahim and Baker 2009). Its area of occupancy is restricted to 880 km².

== Conservation ==
The palm is an IUCN Red List vulnerable species, due to habitat loss and artisanal mining. Currently, almost all the area where the palm occurs has been demarcated and leased by the government as concessions for national and foreign gold companies (Ali 2016, H. Ibrahim. pers. comm. 2017). Mining activities within the distribution of Medemia argun result in major landscape disturbance due to large scale excavations and tunneling. In addition, the mining companies seek ground water by drilling holes and digging exploration trenches, which cause both severe habitat degradation and destruction for the species. Moreover, mercury and cyanide are used in gold mining, leading to the pollution of ground water.

The palm is also threatened by climate change, which will likely stress existing populations and inhibit the recruitment of juveniles.

In Egypt, the species occurs in Wadi Allaqi Biosphere Reserve and Dungul Oasis. In 2003 an ex situ conservation experiment was done in University of Aswan, Egypt, where 21 seedlings had been planted in the University desert garden. Some of them are now fruiting. Medemia argun has also been introduced to cultivation outside Africa.

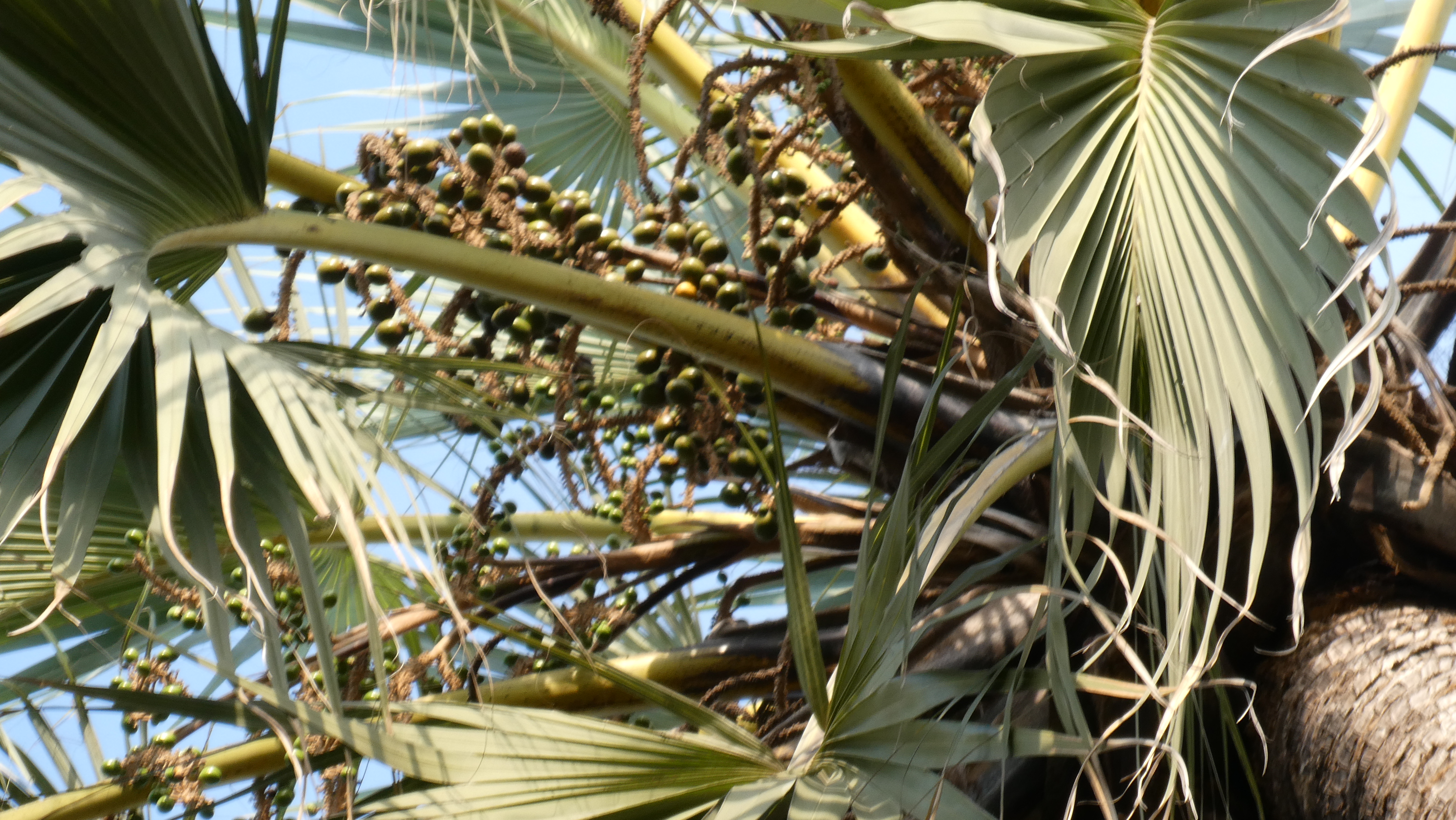
Immature fruits

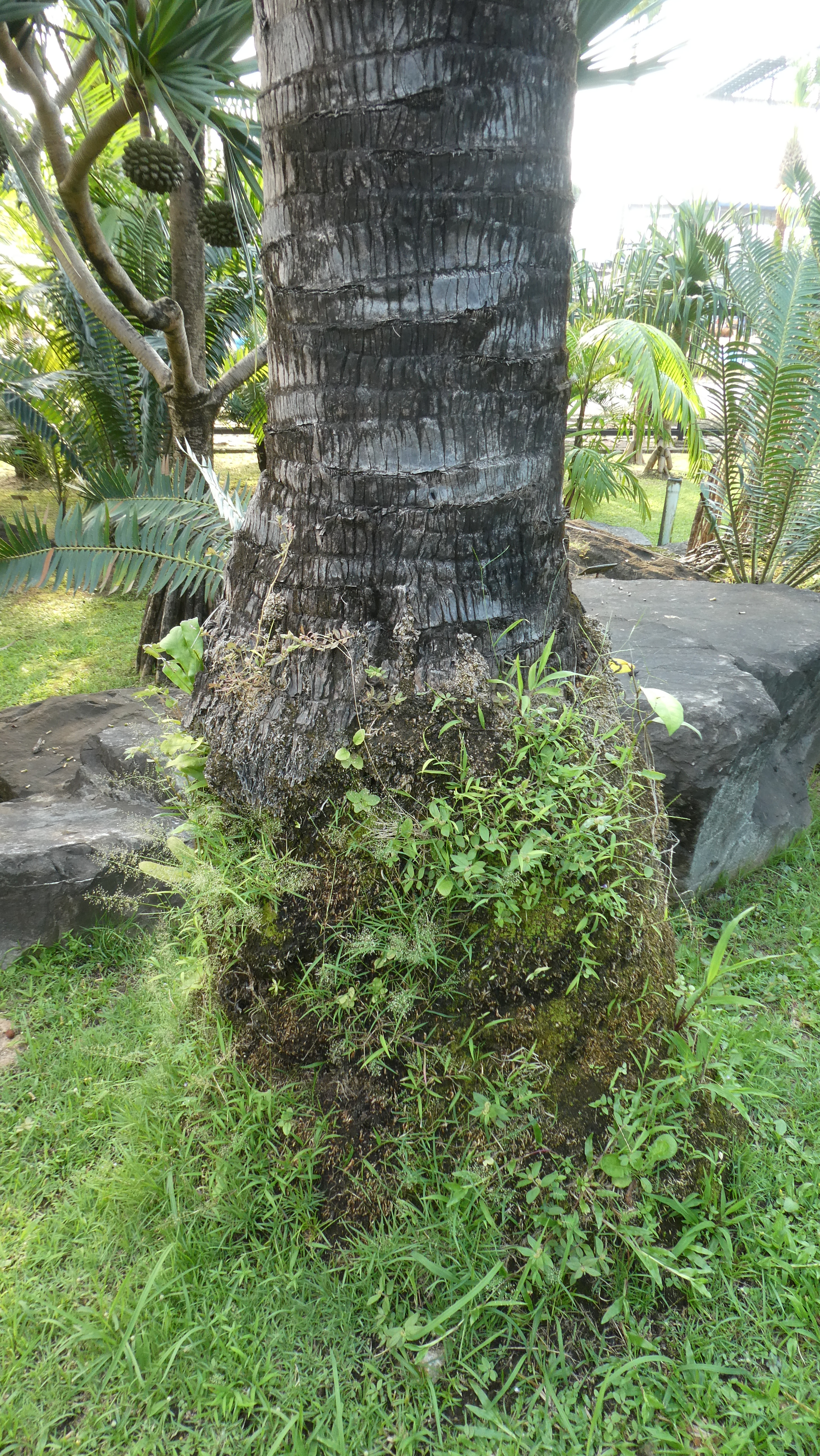
Trunk

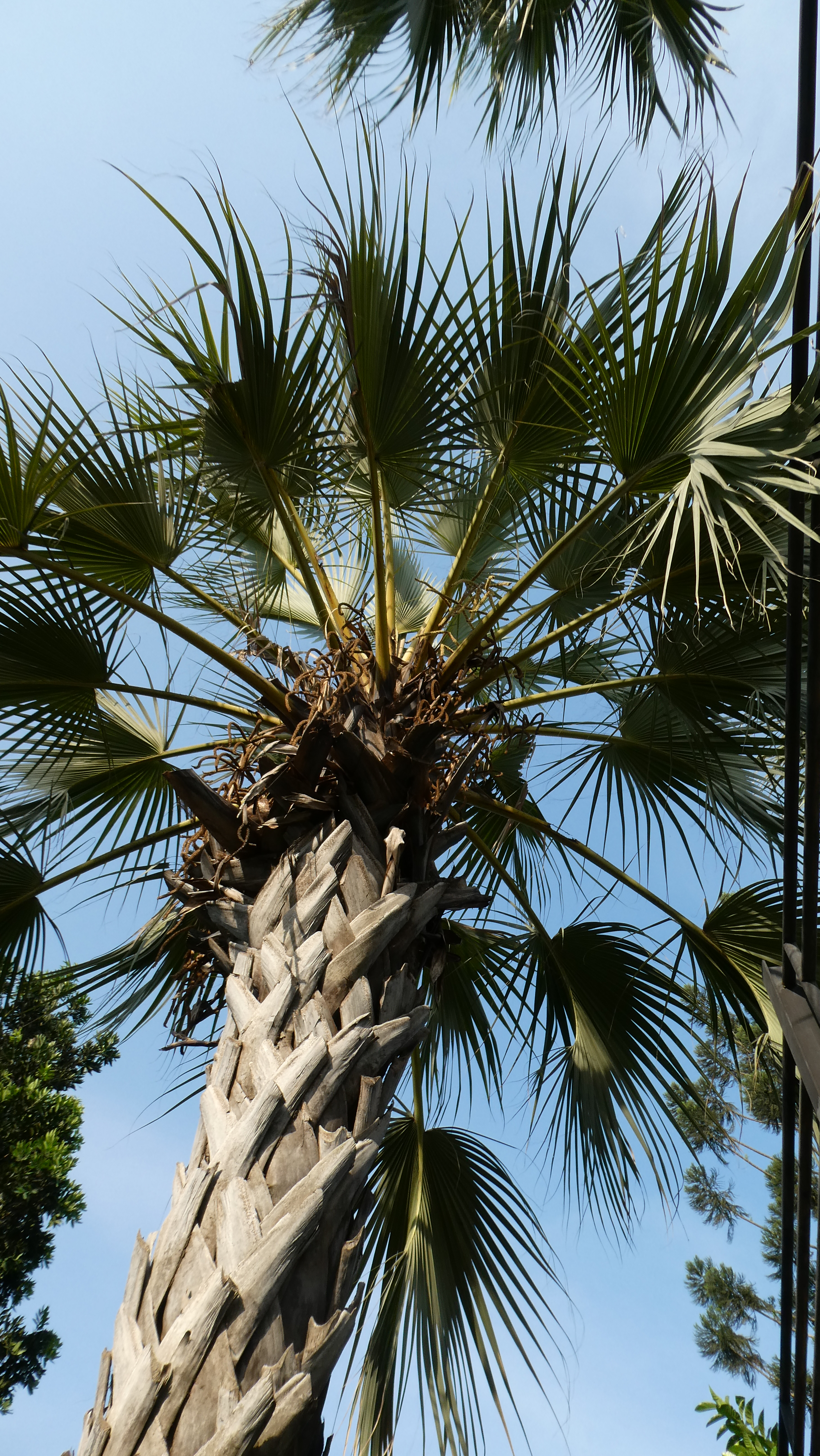
Aspect of the crown
