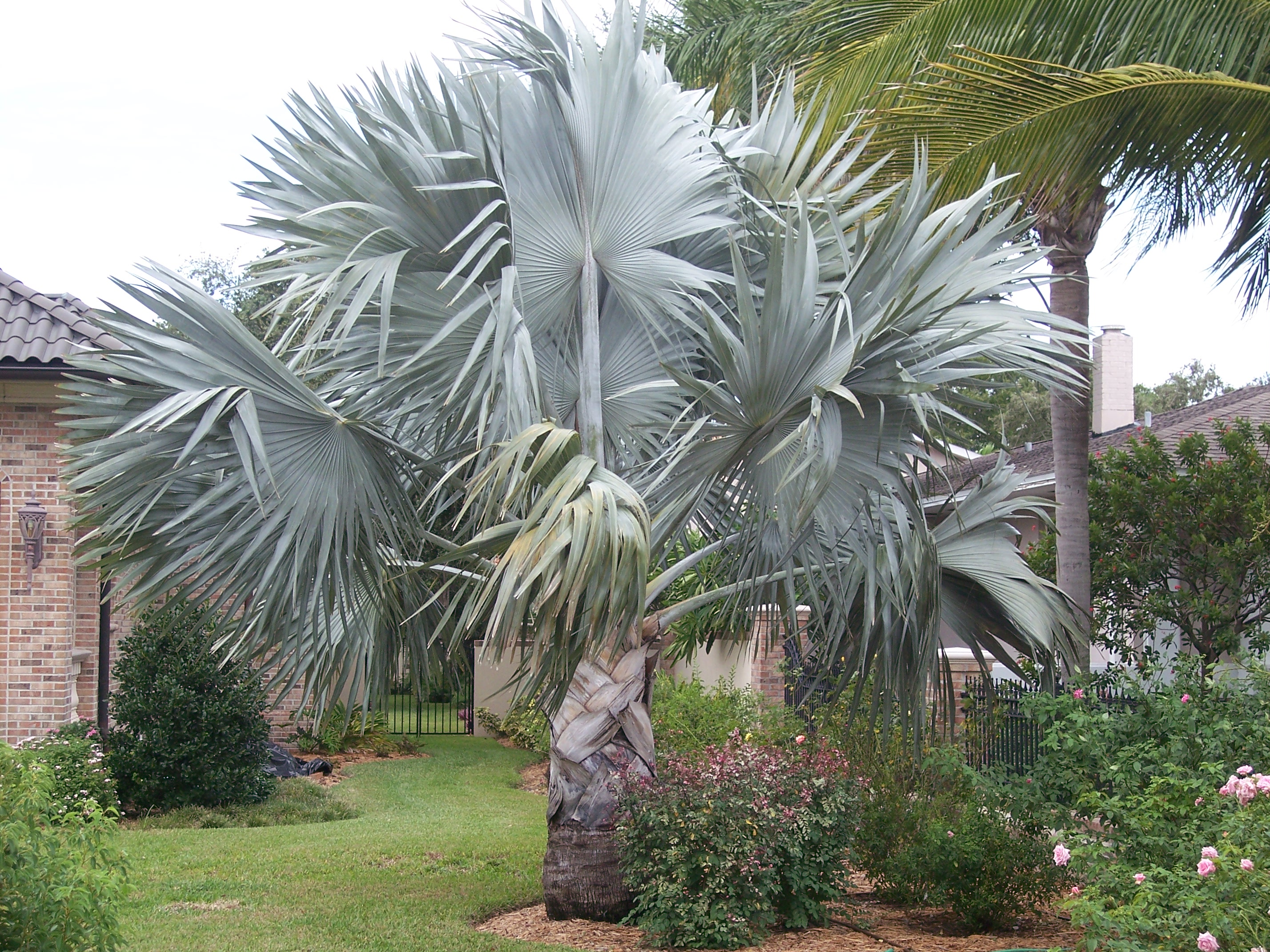

Conservation status
- Least Concern (IUCN 3.1)

Scientific classification
- Kingdom: Plantae
- Clade: Tracheophytes
- Clade: Angiosperms
- Clade: Monocots
- Clade: Commelinids
- Order: Arecales
- Family: Arecaceae
- Subfamily: Coryphoideae
- Tribe: Borasseae
- Genus: Bismarckia; Hildebr. & H.Wendl.
- Species: B. nobilis

Binomial name
- Bismarckia nobilis Hildebr. & H.Wendl.

= Bismarckia =

Genus of palms

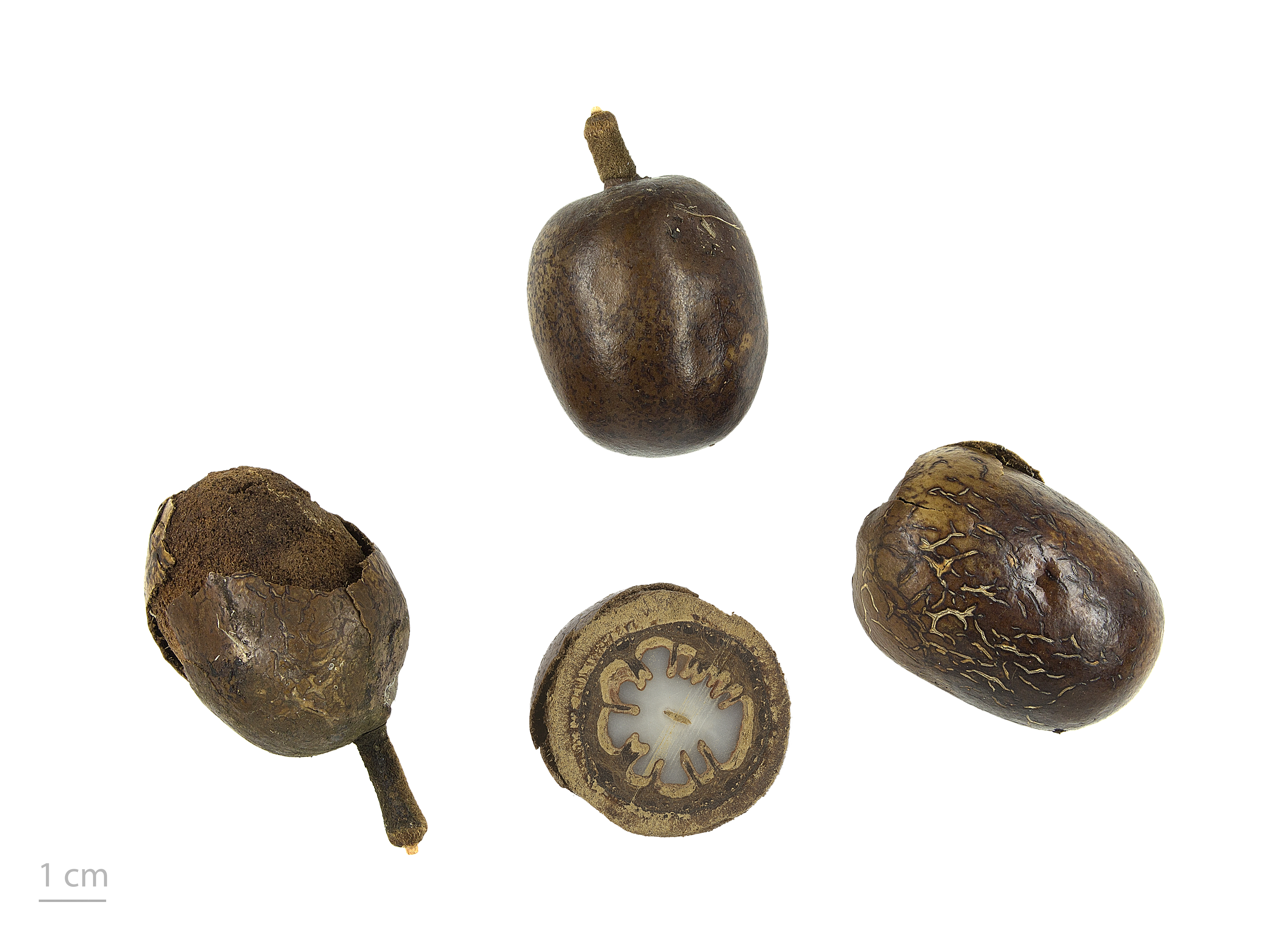
Bismarckia nobilis – MHNT

Bismarckia is a monotypic genus of flowering plant in the palm family with Bismarckia nobilis being the only species in the genus and is endemic to western and northern Madagascar, where it grows in open grassland.

Bismarckia nobilis is widely cultivated in tropical and subtropical regions of the world.

== Etymology ==
The genus Bismarckia is named for the first chancellor of the German Empire Otto von Bismarck. The epithet (or species name) nobilis comes from Latin for 'noble'.

In its native Madagascar, Bismarckia nobilis is known in Malagasy as satrana.

== Description ==
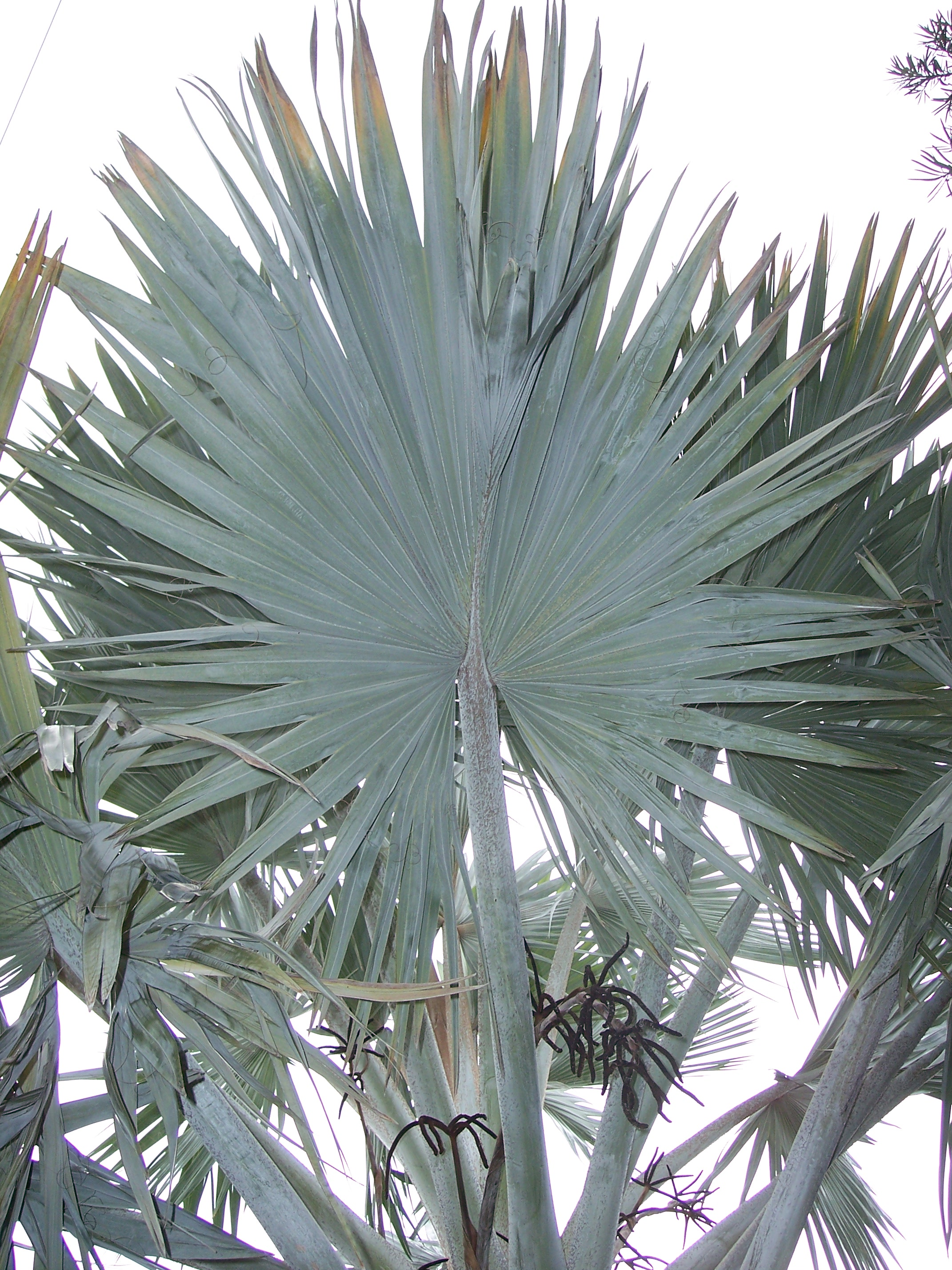
Foliage and young flowers

Bismarckia nobilis grows from solitary trunks, gray to tan in color, which show ringed indentations from old leaf bases. Trunks are 30 to 45 cm in diameter, slightly bulging at the base, and free of leaf bases in all but its youngest parts. In their natural habitat they can reach above 25 meters in height but usually get no taller than 12 m in cultivation. The nearly rounded leaves are enormous in maturity, over 3 m wide, and are divided to a third its length into 20 or more stiff, once-folded segments, themselves split on the ends. The leaves are induplicate and costapalmate, producing a wedge-shaped hastula where the blade and petiole meet. Petioles are 2–3 m, slightly armed, and are covered in a white wax as well as cinnamon-colored caducous scales; the nearly-spherical leaf crown is 7.5 m wide and 6 m tall. These palms are dioecious and produce pendent, interfoliar inflorescences of small brown flowers which, in female plants, mature to a brown ovoid drupe, each containing a single seed.

== Distribution and habitat ==
Bismarckia is native to Madagascar, an island well known for its rich diversity of unique taxa and is home to a diverse flora. Whilst the genus Bismarckia comprises only the single species Bismarckia nobilis, Madagascar itself is home to around 170 species of native palms of which 165 are solely native to Madagascar).

In Madagascar, Bismarckia nobilis grows at elevations between sea level and 800m across the plains and plateaus of the central highlands, nearly reaching the western and northern coasts, in savannas of low grass, usually in lateritic soil. As much of this land has been cleared with fire for agricultural use, Bismarckia nobilis, along with other fire-resistant trees like Ravenala madagascariensis and Uapaca bojeri, are the most conspicuous components of this arid region.

== Conservation ==
As of November 2024, the most recent International Union for Conservation (IUCN) Red List assessment was conducted in December 2010 and published in 2021, and Bismarckia nobilis was classified as a species of Least Concern. This assessment described the species as being widespread and common in its native range with mature individuals likely to exceed 10,000 plants; however, it was noted that the species is facing certain threats including a loss of habitat due to agricultural expansion, increasing frequency of fires, and mining activities in parts of its range.

In its native range the leaves and the pith of the palm is sometimes eaten as food and the species is also exploited for its timber.

== Cultivation ==
Bismarck palms are grown throughout the tropics and subtropics under favorable microclimates. They are grown in many parts of Indonesia, Australia, as well as in landscaping in the United Arab Emirates. In the United States, they are planted in several areas of Florida, a few areas of Southern California, southern and southeastern Texas, and southern Arizona.

Taxonomically, Bismarckia is monotypic genus, with Bismarckia nobilis being the only species, with no recognized subspecies or taxonomic varieties. In horticulture however, some growers recognize a difference between individuals based on leaf coloration, describing a more commonly grown 'silver variety' (or alternatively form or selection) and a 'green variety' with some growers claiming the green leaf variety is less hardy to cold.

Bismarckia nobilis is considered to be highly tolerant of drought conditions but thrives in high rainfall areas and are moderately tolerant of sea spray. Palms are tolerant of a wide range of soils but can be susceptible to potassium deficiency. Because of their massive crowns, they need plenty of room in a landscape area.

== Care and maintenance ==
Bismarck palms are easy to grow in the right environment as they are adaptable to a wide range of soils and prefer to have good drainage as the Bismarck does not like to have root rot. The Bismarck palm can adapt to either acidic or alkaline soil and prefers to be watered directly into the root system or sprayed through the palm heart. When planting the Bismarck palm make sure not to cover up any part of the trunk, as this will lead to problems as the Bismarck palm is susceptible to be eaten by microorganisms that live naturally in soil and other mediums.
