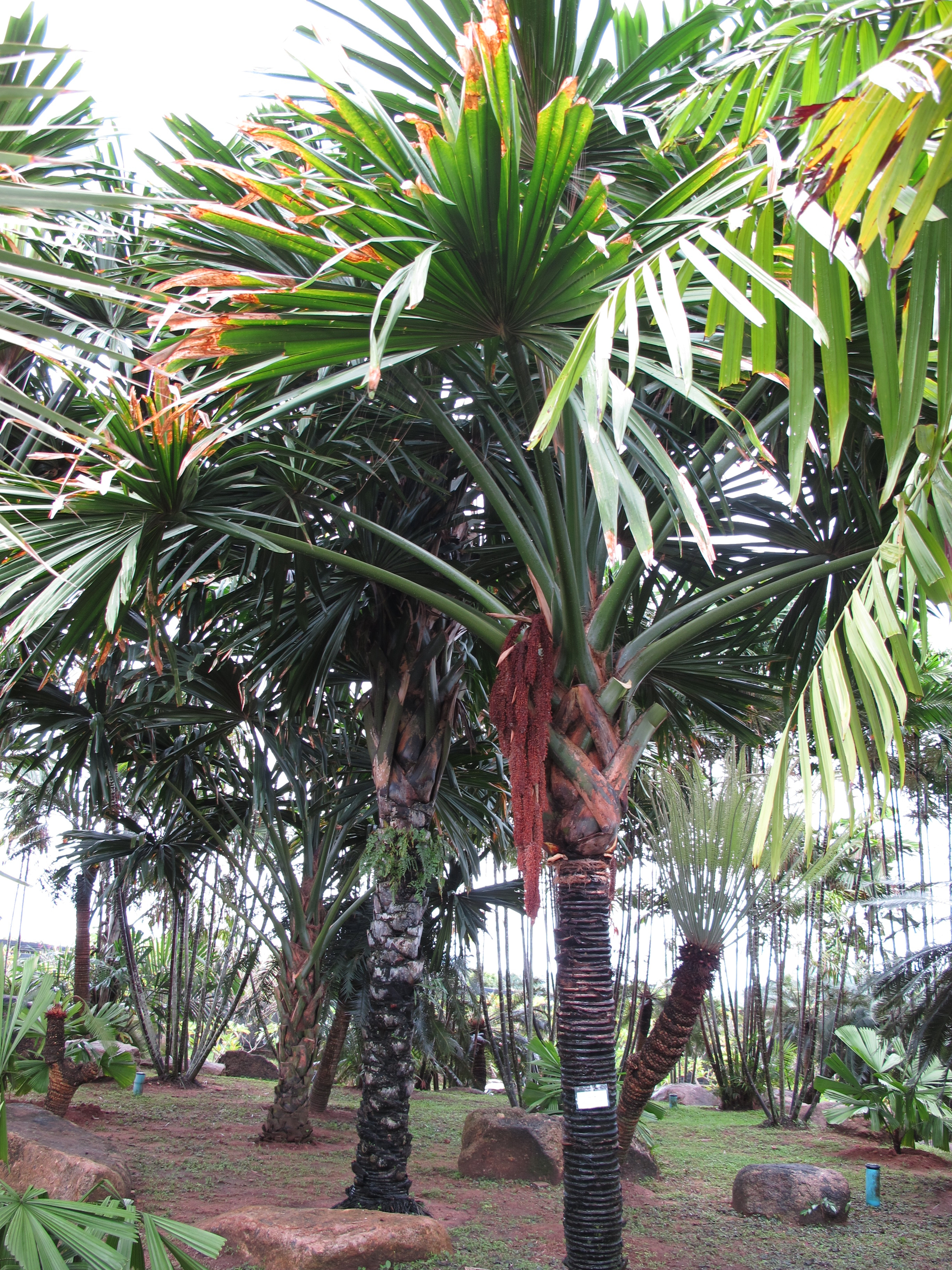

Conservation status
- Vulnerable (IUCN 2.3)

Scientific classification
- Kingdom: Plantae
- Clade: Tracheophytes
- Clade: Angiosperms
- Clade: Monocots
- Clade: Commelinids
- Order: Arecales
- Family: Arecaceae
- Genus: Borassodendron
- Species: B. machadonis

Binomial name
- Borassodendron machadonis Becc.

= Borassodendron machadonis =

Species of palm

Borassodendron machadonis is a species of flowering plant in the family Arecaceae. It is found in Peninsular Malaysia and Thailand. It is threatened by habitat loss. It is occasionally cultivated as an ornamental.
