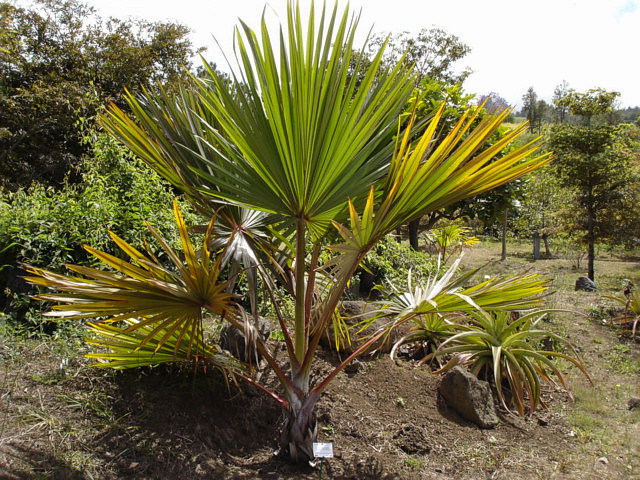
- Red latan palm

Scientific classification
- Kingdom: Plantae
- Clade: Tracheophytes
- Clade: Angiosperms
- Clade: Monocots
- Clade: Commelinids
- Order: Arecales
- Family: Arecaceae
- Tribe: Borasseae
- Genus: Latania; Comm. ex Juss.

Type species
- Latania lontaroides

Synonyms
- Cleophora Gaertn.

= Latania =

Genus of palms

Latania, commonly known as latan palm or latania palm, is a genus of flowering plant in the palm tree family, native to the Mascarene Islands in the western Indian Ocean.

== Species ==
The genus contains three species, one from each of the three major islands (including islets) in the chain. The species have been assessed as critically endangered or endangered by the IUCN.

Image	Leaves	Common name	Scientific name	Native Distribution
		blue latan palm, latanier de l'Ile Ronde	Latania loddigesii Mart.	Mauritius
		red latan palm, latanier de la Réunion	Latania lontaroides (Gaertn.) H.E.Moore	Réunion
		yellow latan palm, latanier de Rodrigues	Latania verschaffeltii Lem.	Rodrigues Island

Latan palms are large, single-stemmed fan palms with separate male and female plants (dioecy); when the leaves fall, they leave scars on the trunks. Male flowers are small, in clusters, and emerge from within leathery bracts on the catkin-like inflorescences. Female flowers are larger, solitary and not concealed within bracts. The fruits contain 1-3 pyrenes, which are seeds enclosed within woody endocarps. The endocarps have sculpted surfaces and the three species are readily distinguished from their pyrenes.

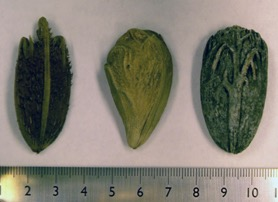
Pyrenes (seeds within endocarps) of the three species of Latania: left, L. verschaffeltii; middle, L. lontaroides; right, L. loddigesii
