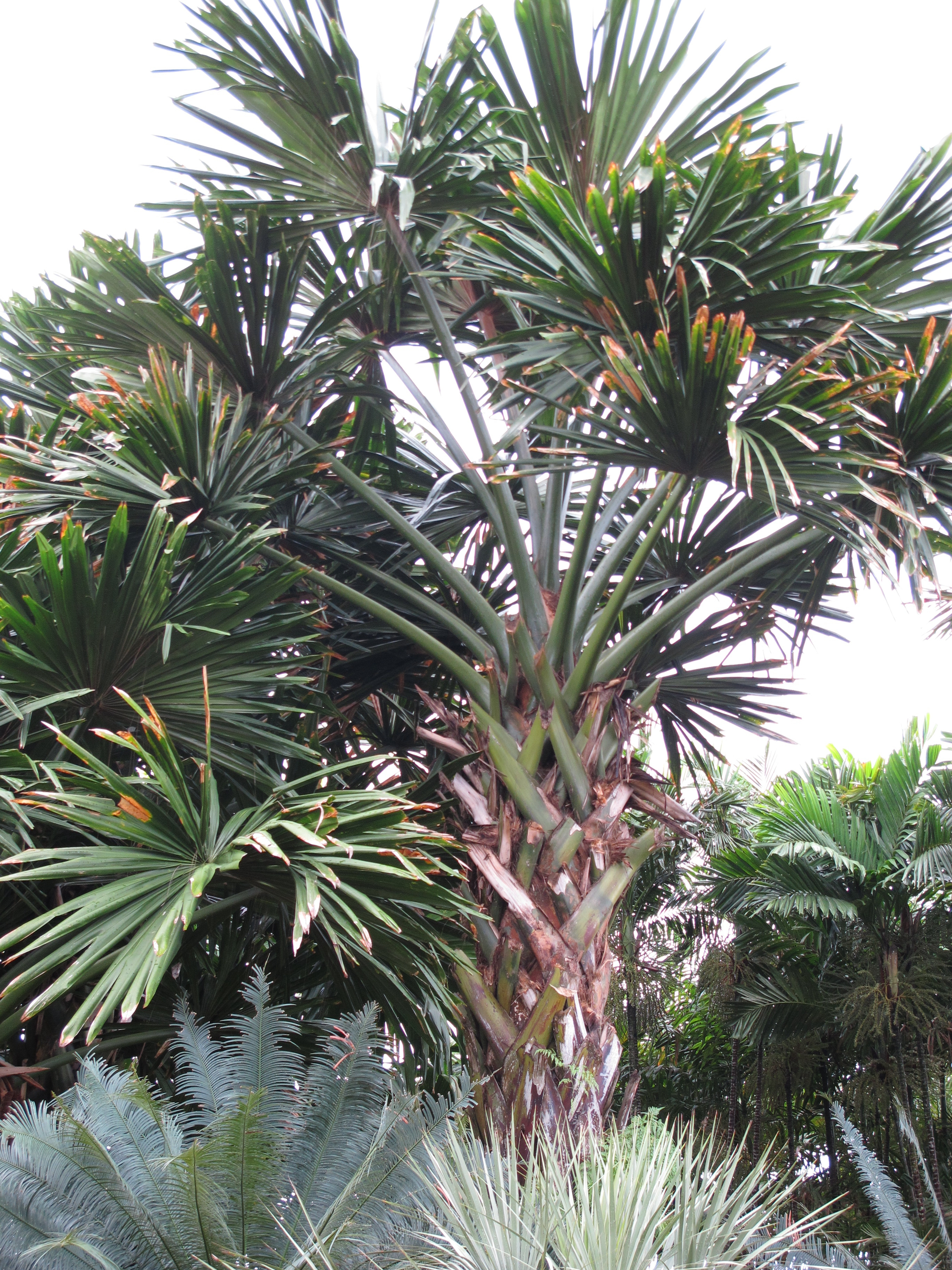
- Borassodendron machadonis

Scientific classification
- Kingdom: Plantae
- Clade: Tracheophytes
- Clade: Angiosperms
- Clade: Monocots
- Clade: Commelinids
- Order: Arecales
- Family: Arecaceae
- Subfamily: Coryphoideae
- Tribe: Borasseae
- Genus: Borassodendron; Becc.

= Borassodendron =

Genus of palms

Borassodendron is a genus of flowering plant in the family Arecaceae. It contains two species, native to Southeast Asia.

== Species ==
- Borassodendron borneense J.Dransf. - Borneo
- Borassodendron machadonis (Ridl.) Becc. - southern Thailand, southern Myanmar, Peninsular Malaysia
