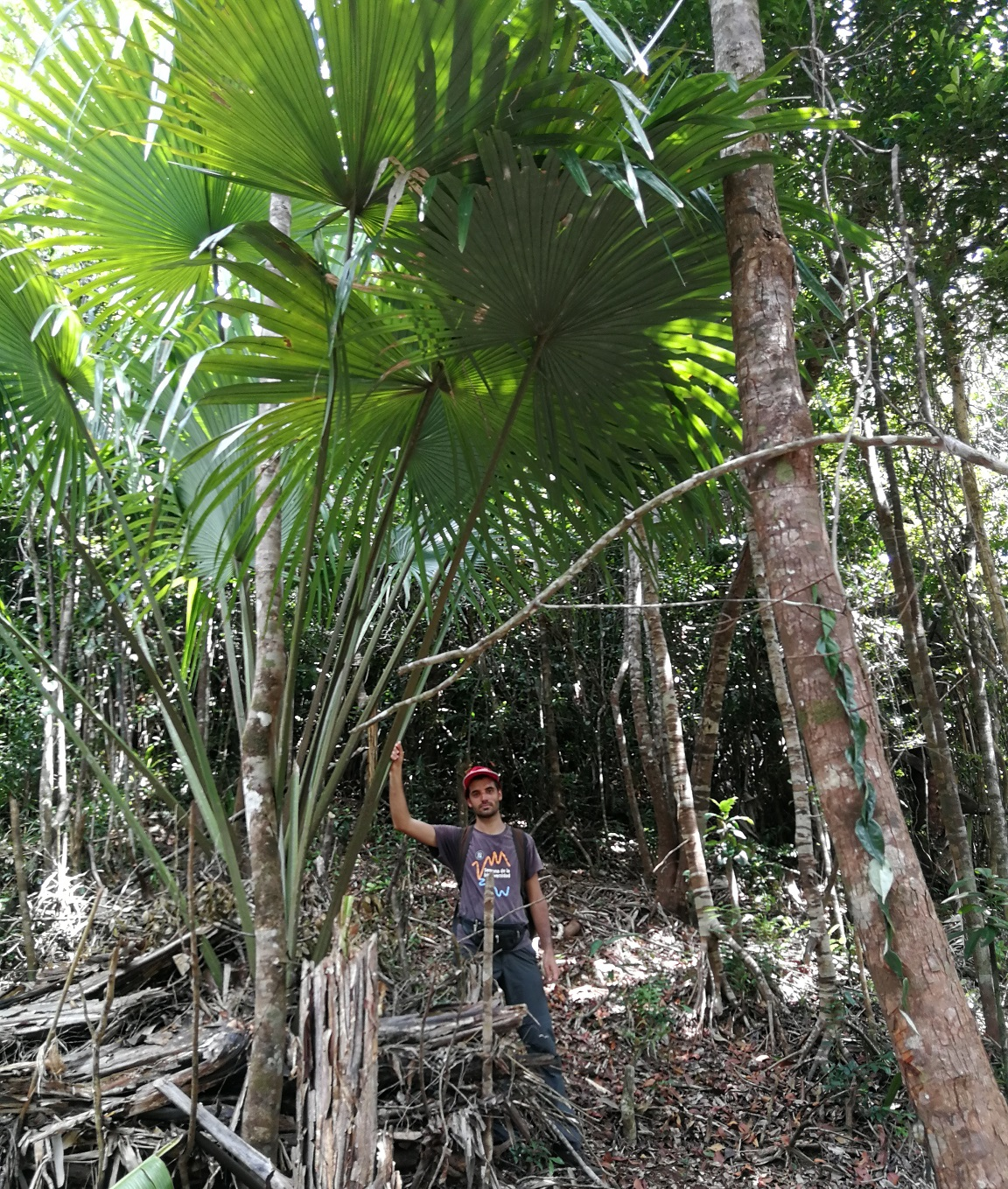
- The botanist Carlos G. Boluda with a young Satranala decussilvae

Conservation status
- Endangered (IUCN 3.1)
- CITES Appendix II

Scientific classification
- Kingdom: Plantae
- Clade: Embryophytes
- Clade: Tracheophytes
- Clade: Angiosperms
- Clade: Monocots
- Clade: Commelinids
- Order: Arecales
- Family: Arecaceae
- Subfamily: Coryphoideae
- Tribe: Borasseae
- Genus: Satranala; Beentje & J.Dransf.
- Species: S. decussilvae

Binomial name
- Satranala decussilvae Beentje & J.Dransf.

= Satranala =

Species of flowering plant

Satranala decussilvae is a species of flowering plant in the Arecaceae family. It is a palm endemic to Madagascar. It is the only species in the genus Satranala, and is threatened by habitat loss. There are perhaps 200 mature individuals remaining.

The fruit of these trees is roughly spherical to ovoid, around 5.6–5 centimetres (2.2–2.0 in) in diameter, with a purple-black shiny outer layer (epicarp), with the main part of the fruit (mesocarp) being dry and fleshy. The interior of the fruit has a highly sculptured endocarp (woody layer surrounding the seed) with sinuous wing-like structures, which has been suggested to be an adaptation to being swallowed and surviving the crop of elephant birds, an extinct group of large flightless birds formerly native to the island, as New Guinea palm fruit with similar features, belonging to the genera Ptychococcus, Brassiophoenix and Licuala are readily eaten by cassowaries who serve as their major seed dispersers.
