= Nothofagus rutila =

Scientific classification
- Kingdom: Plantae
- Clade: Tracheophytes
- Clade: Angiosperms
- Clade: Eudicots
- Clade: Rosids
- Order: Fagales
- Family: Nothofagaceae
- Genus: Nothofagus
- Species: N. rutila

Binomial name
- Nothofagus rutila Ravenna (2000)

Species of flowering plant

Nothofagus rutila is a species of tree in the family Nothofagaceae. It is endemic to central Chile. Common names include roble rojo, and roble encendido.

== Description ==
Nothofagus rutila is a deciduous shrub or small tree which grows from 1.5 to 10 meters tall. Leaves are 24–50 mm long by (18–) 22–35 mm wide, dark green in color but lighter on the abaxial face, and turning red in autumn.

Populations of the species were previously described as Nothofagus macrocarpa.

== Range and habitat ==
Nothofagus rutila grows in the Chilean Coast Range (Cordillera de la Costa) northwest of Santiago in Chacabuco, Quillota, and San Felipe de Aconcagua provinces. It has been found at Cerro El Roble, Caleu, Cuesta La Dormida, and Chicauma. Much of its range is within La Campana National Park.

On Cerro El Roble it grows in nearly pure stands at 2,200 metres elevation. Near the summit it grows as a shrub, among other plants such as Sisyrinchium laevigatum, Alstroemeria polpaicana, and Sisyrinchium arenarium subsp. arenarium. In other places, including Caleu and Cuesta La Dormida, it grows among other shrubs and low trees.
