= Melica argentata =

Scientific classification
- Kingdom: Plantae
- Clade: Tracheophytes
- Clade: Angiosperms
- Clade: Monocots
- Clade: Commelinids
- Order: Poales
- Family: Poaceae
- Subfamily: Pooideae
- Genus: Melica
- Species: M. argentata'

Binomial name
- Melica argentata' E. Desv.

Species of plant

Melica argentata is a species of grass endemic to Chile (Coquimbo and O'Higgins).

== Description ==
The species culmes are rambled, and are either straight or zigzag shaped. They are 40–200 centimetres (16–79 in) long and 2–4 centimetres (0.79–1.57 in) in diameter. The leaf-sheaths are tubular with the membrane being scaberulous and 2–10 millimetres (0.079–0.394 in) long. The leaf-blades though are 2–15 centimetres (0.79–5.91 in) long and 1.5–5.5 millimetres (0.059–0.217 in) wide. It also has scabrous margins and bottom which is rough on both sides. The panicle is pyramidical and is 10–25 centimetres (3.9–9.8 in) long. It has secund branches with scabrous axis. Spikelets are solitary with fertile spikelets being pedicelled, pedicels of which are ciliated, curved, filiformed and hairy. They also have 2 fertile florets which are diminished at the apex and which are also elliptic and are 6–10 millimetres (0.24–0.39 in) long. The callus of the floret is pubescent and also has scaberulous rhachilla.

The fertile lemma is chartaceous, oblong, is 6–8.5 millimetres (0.24–0.33 in) long and 1.8–2.4 millimetres (0.071–0.094 in) wide. Sterile florets are barren and grow in a clump, which is also cuneated and is 1.5–2.5 millimetres (0.059–0.098 in) in length. The apex of the lemma is emarginated with the hairs being of 1.5–1.8 millimetres (0.059–0.071 in) in length. The lower glume is membranous, ovate, is 5–8 millimetres (0.20–0.31 in) long and is 0.75 millimetres (0.030 in) longer than the upper glume. The upper glume is oblong and is 5.5–9 millimetres (0.22–0.35 in) long. Both glumes are emarginated, are asperulous on the bottom and have no keels. The lower glume is 5–6 veined while the upper one is 5-veined. Flowers are fleshy, oblong, truncate and are 0.25 millimetres (0.0098 in) long with 3 anthers which are 2–2.5 millimetres (0.079–0.098 in) in length. The species palea is 2-veined with ciliolated keels which are adorned on the top. Fruits have caryopsis with an added pericarp and are 2.8–3 millimetres (0.11–0.12 in) long. They are dark brown in colour and have a linear hilum which is 1 length of their caryopsis.

== Ecology ==
Melica argentata can be found growing on slopes and in valleys of the Andes at an elevation between 600–2,000 metres (2,000–6,600 ft). It grows with other species including Lithraea caustica, Quillaja saponaria, Colliguaja odorifera, Trevoa trinervis, Schinus polygamus, Acacia caven, Proustia pungens, Muehlenbeckia hastulata and Melica longiflora. The flowering time is from August to September.
