= Melica longiflora =

Scientific classification
- Kingdom: Plantae
- Clade: Tracheophytes
- Clade: Angiosperms
- Clade: Monocots
- Clade: Commelinids
- Order: Poales
- Family: Poaceae
- Subfamily: Pooideae
- Genus: Melica
- Species: M. longiflora

Binomial name
- Melica longiflora Steud.

Species of grass

Melica longiflora is a grass species in the family Poaceae that is endemic to Chile where it can be found from Coquimbo to Talca.

== Description ==
The species is perennial and is caespitose as well. The culms are either ascended or rambled, are 15–200 centimetres (5.9–78.7 in) long and 2–5 millimetres (0.079–0.197 in) in diameter. The leaf-sheaths are tubular, retrorsely scabrous, and are either glabrous or pilose on the bottom. The leaf-blades are aromatic, are 7–22 centimetres (2.8–8.7 in) long and 1.5–5 millimetres (0.059–0.197 in) wide. Just like leaf-sheaths they are scabrous, but unlike them they are hairy, glabrous or pubescent, and are rough on both sides. Their margins are glabrous, scabrous or ciliated. The panicle is open, pyramidal, and is 5–30 centimetres (2.0–11.8 in) long. The main panicle branches are contracted and have scaberulous or smooth axis, while the other panicle branches are secund.

Spikelets are solitary with fertile spikelets being pedicelled, pedicels of which are ciliated, curved, filiform, scabrous and hairy on top. The spikelets are elliptic, are 8–13 millimetres (0.31–0.51 in) long, and have 2 fertile florets which are diminished at the apex. Floret callus is pubescent. The upper glume is lanceolated and is 7–12 millimetres (0.28–0.47 in) long and 0.9 length of the top fertile lemma. Lemma is chartaceous, lanceolated, and is 6–8.5 millimetres (0.24–0.33 in) long and 1.6–2 millimetres (0.063–0.079 in) wide. Lemma hairs are 1–2 millimetres (0.039–0.079 in) long with erose, emarginate or obtuse apex. The bottom of both upper and lower glumes are asperulous but the apexes are different; Lower one is erose, obtuse, or sometimes acute, while the upper one is only acute. The lower glume is ovate and is 5-7 veined while the upper glume is only 5-veined. Palea is scabrous on the bottom and is 2-veined.

Flowers are fleshy, ciliate or glabrous, oblong, truncate, and grow together. They are 0.3–0.4 millimetres (0.012–0.016 in) long and have 3 anthers each of which is 1.5–2 millimetres (0.059–0.079 in) long. Fruits have caryopsis which also have attached pericarp, are 2.5–3 millimetres (0.098–0.118 in) in length and are dark brown in colour. The hilum is linear and is 1 length of the caryopses.

== Ecology ==
Melica longiflora can be found growing on hills and central plains in the lower parts of the Andes on the elevation of 1,300 metres (4,300 ft) where similar genera, such as Eulychnia, Proustia, Trichocereus, and species Acacia caven, Baccharis linearis, Lithraea caustica, Peumus boldus, Puya chilensis, Schismus polygamus, and Trevoa trinervis can be found as well. The flowers bloom only August to December.
