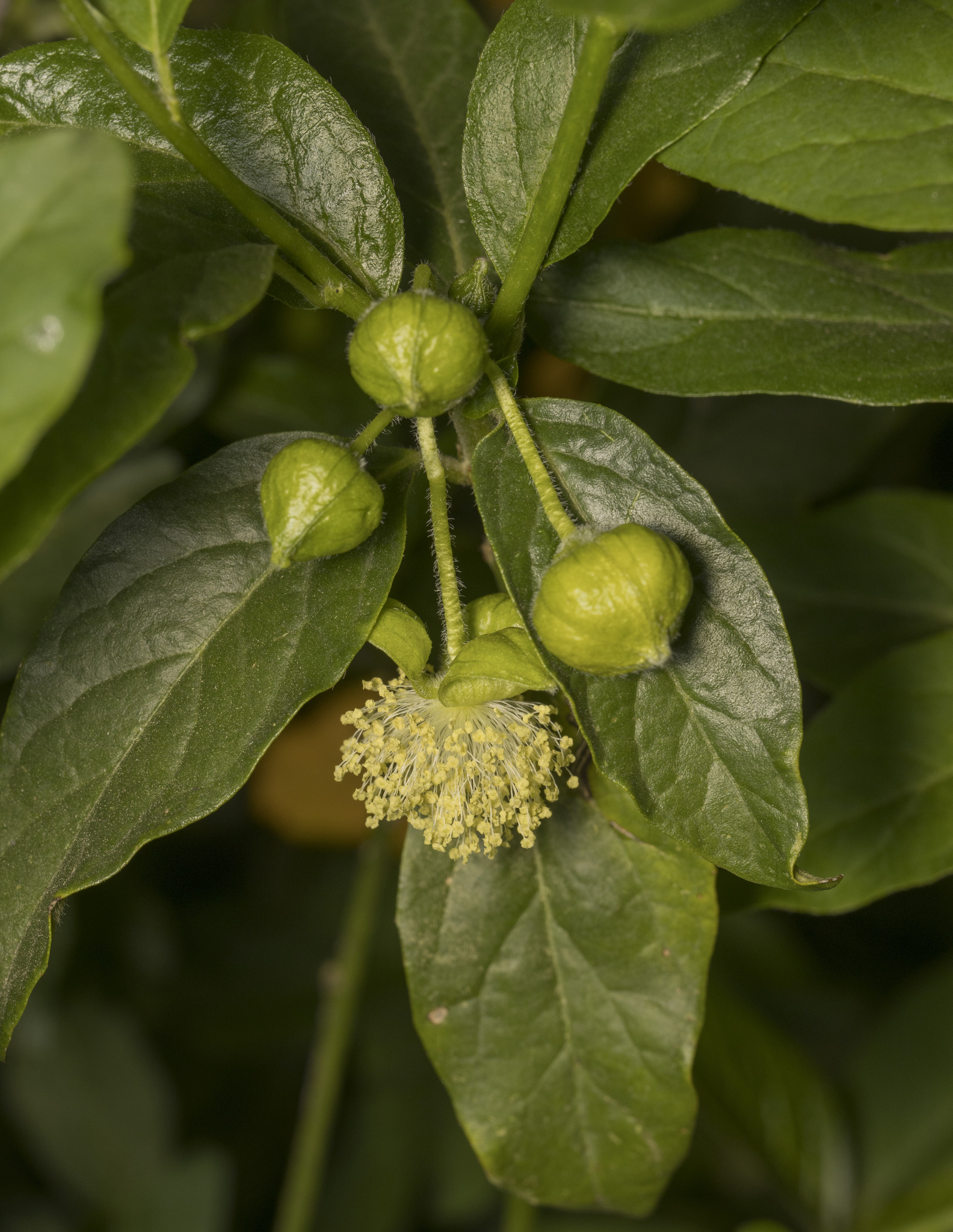

Scientific classification
- Kingdom: Plantae
- Clade: Tracheophytes
- Clade: Angiosperms
- Clade: Eudicots
- Clade: Rosids
- Order: Malpighiales
- Family: Euphorbiaceae
- Subfamily: Acalyphoideae
- Tribe: Acalypheae
- Subtribe: Rottlerinae
- Genus: Avellanita; Phil.
- Species: A. bustillosii

Binomial name
- Avellanita bustillosii Phil.

= Avellanita =

Species of plant

Avellanita is a monotypic plant genus of the family Euphorbiaceae. The sole species is Avellanita bustillosii, endemic to Chile. A specific locus of occurrence is in the La Campana National Park of central Chile and amid the adjoining Cerro La Campana. It can also be found in the Laguna Aculeo area and its southern distribution is located in Chancon, close to Rancagua. Regarding the use of its seeds, it has been pointed out that its "small hazelnuts" are edible.

== See also ==
- Gevuina
