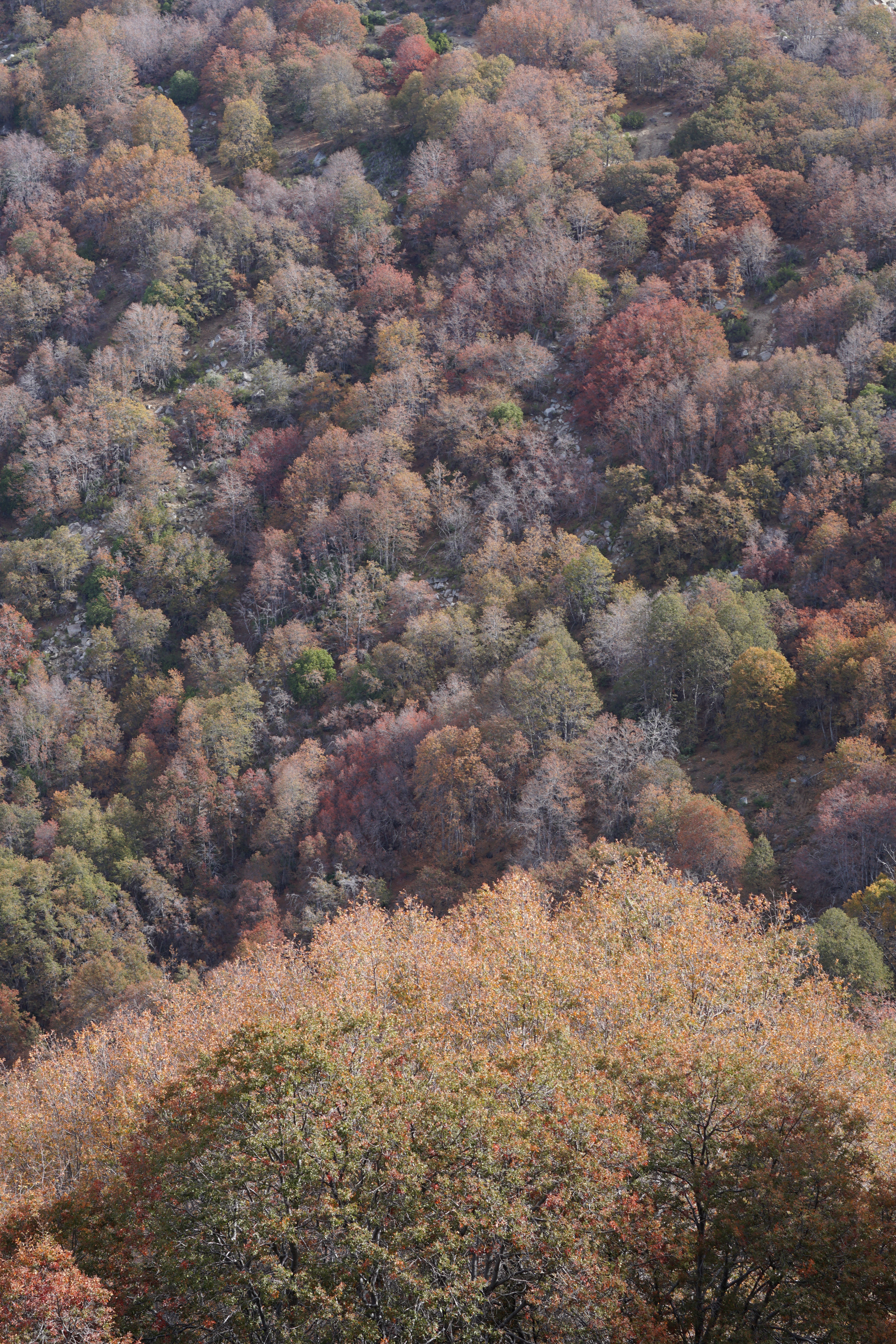
- Nothofagus macrocarpa forest on Cerro El Roble

Conservation status
- Vulnerable (IUCN 3.1)

Scientific classification
- Kingdom: Plantae
- Clade: Embryophytes
- Clade: Tracheophytes
- Clade: Spermatophytes
- Clade: Angiosperms
- Clade: Eudicots
- Clade: Rosids
- Order: Fagales
- Family: Nothofagaceae
- Genus: Nothofagus
- Species: N. macrocarpa

Binomial name
- Nothofagus macrocarpa (A.DC.) F.M.Vázquez & R.A.Rodr. (1999)

Synonyms
- Fagus obliqua var. macrocarpa A.DC. (1864); Lophozonia macrocarpa (A.DC.) Heenan & Smissen (2013); Nothofagus obliqua var. macrocarpa (A.DC.) Reiche (1897)

= Nothofagus macrocarpa =

Species of plant

Nothofagus macrocarpa, commonly known as roble de Santiago or Santiago's oak, is a deciduous tree in the Nothofagaceae family that is endemic to the mountains of central Chile.

== Description ==
Nothofagus macrocarpa is a tree growing 4 to 10 meters tall. It has a stout trunk, either single or with two or three growing from the base. The bark is rough and grayish brown with longitudinal and transverse cracks. It has a leafy and densely-branched crown 3 to 5 meters wide. Leaves are bright green and wavy at the edges, typically oval, and measure 13 to 45 mm long by 7 to 23 mm wide.

== Range and habitat ==
Nothofagus macrocarpa grows at higher elevations of the Altos de Cantillana, in Melipilla Province southwest of Santiago, at approximately 2,200 meters elevation. It is also found to the east in the Andes foothills of Cachapoal Province from 500 to 2,000 meters elevation.

Populations on Cerro El Roble and other nearby mountains once identified as N. macrocarpa were reclassified in 2000 as a distinct species, Nothofagus rutila.

== Classification ==
It is sometimes regarded as a subspecies of Nothofagus obliqua. In 2013 Heenan and Smissen proposed renaming N. macrocarpa to Lophozonia macrocarpa.
