= Puya coquimbensis =

Scientific classification
- Kingdom: Plantae
- Clade: Tracheophytes
- Clade: Angiosperms
- Clade: Monocots
- Clade: Commelinids
- Order: Poales
- Family: Bromeliaceae
- Genus: Puya
- Species: P. coquimbensis

Binomial name
- Puya coquimbensis Mez

Species of flowering plant

Puya coquimbensis is a species in the family Bromeliaceae. This species is a rare plant found in certain portions of Chile including Punta Teatinos and Cerro La Campana. In La Campana National Park P.coquimbensis is associated with the endangered Chilean Wine Palm, Jubaea chilensis, which palm prehistorically had a much wider distribution.
