= 3691 Bede =

Slowly rotating asteroid

Discovery
- Discovered by: L. E. González
- Discovery site: Cerro El Roble
- Discovery date: 29 March 1982

Designations
- Pronunciation: /biːd/ BEED
- Named after: Bede
- Alternative designations: MPO 337281

Orbital characteristics
- Epoch 13 January 2016 (JD 2457400.5)
- Uncertainty parameter 0
- Observation arc: 14667 days (40.16 yr)
- Aphelion: 2.279 AU (340.9 Gm)
- Perihelion: 1.270 AU (190.0 Gm)
- Semi-major axis: 1.774 AU (265.4 Gm)
- Eccentricity: 0.284
- Orbital period (sidereal): 2.36 yr (863.35 d)
- Mean anomaly: 90.8°
- Mean motion: 0° 25^{m} 1.131^{s} / day
- Inclination: 20.4°
- Longitude of ascending node: 348.8°
- Argument of perihelion: 234.9°
- Earth MOID: 0.35 AU (52 Gm)

Physical characteristics
- Dimensions: 4.3 km (assumed)
- Synodic rotation period: 226.8 h (9.45 d)
- Geometric albedo: 0.15 (assumed)
- Absolute magnitude (H): 14.7

3691 Bede /biːd/, provisional designation 1982 FT, is an Amor asteroid discovered on March 29, 1982, by Luis E. González at Cerro El Roble.

Based on lightcurve studies, Bede has a rotation period of 226.8 hours, but this figure is based on less than full coverage, so that the period may be wrong by 30 percent or so.
