= La Campana-Peñuelas =

Biosphere reserve in Chile

Coordinates: 32.7800°S 71.0500°W

La Campana-Peñuelas is a Biosphere Reserve located in west-central Chile, the La Campana-Peñuelas Biosphere Reserve encompasses the La Campana National Park and the Lago Peñuelas National Reserve. Forests within the La Campana-Peñuelas are habitats for the Chilean Wine Palm, Jubaea chilensis, an endangered palm, which had a much broader distribution prior to modern times.

== Gallery ==
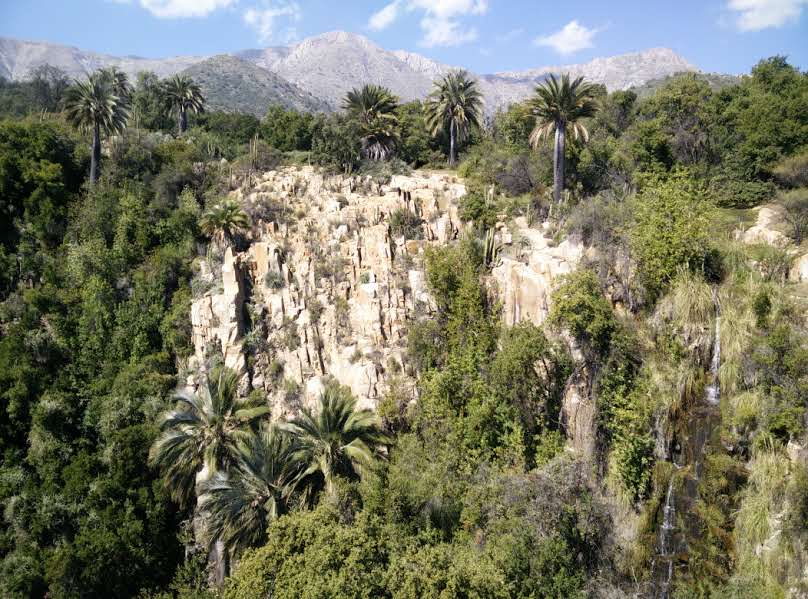
Ocoa palm forest, La Campana National Park.

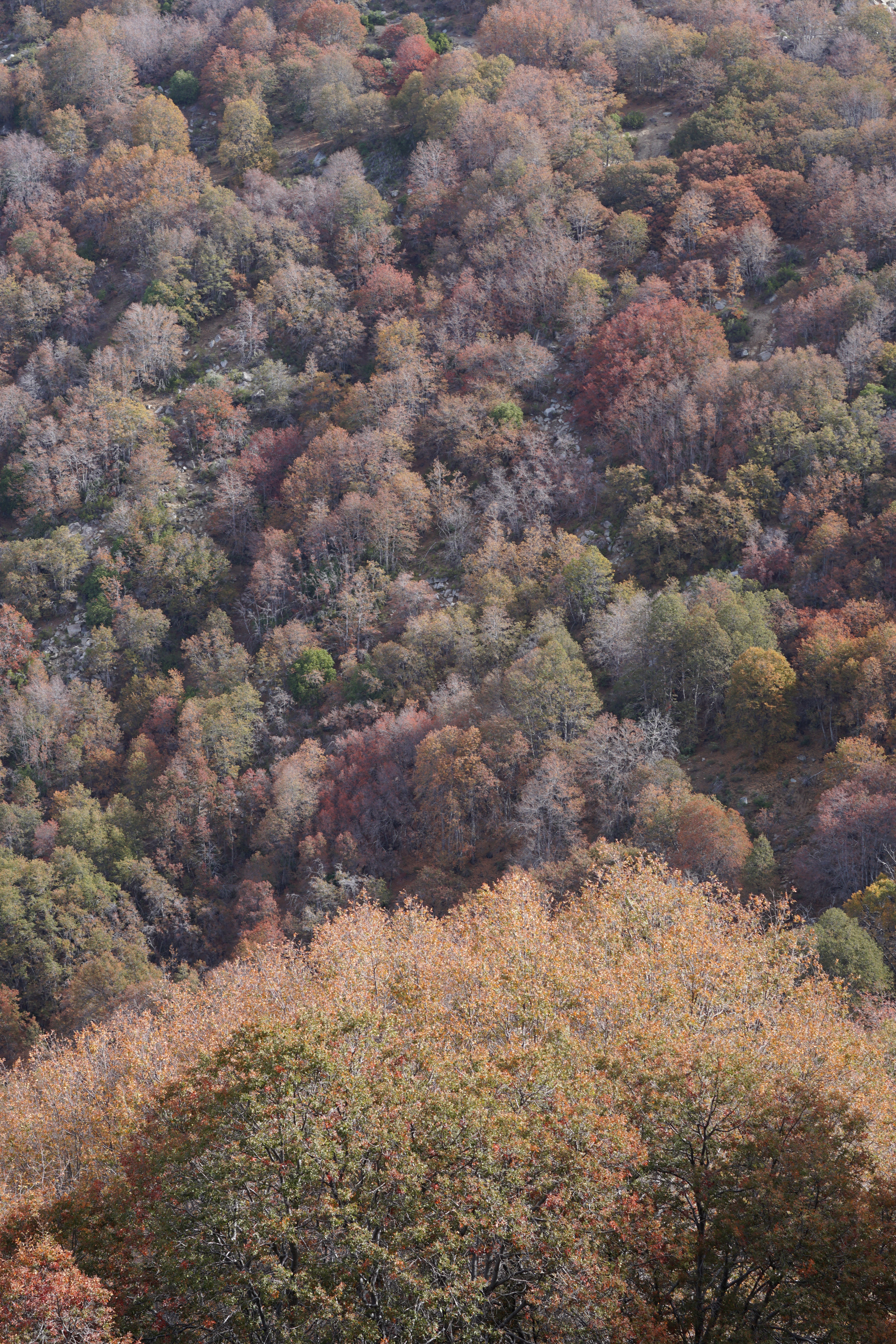
Nothofagus macrocarpa forest in Cerro El Roble.

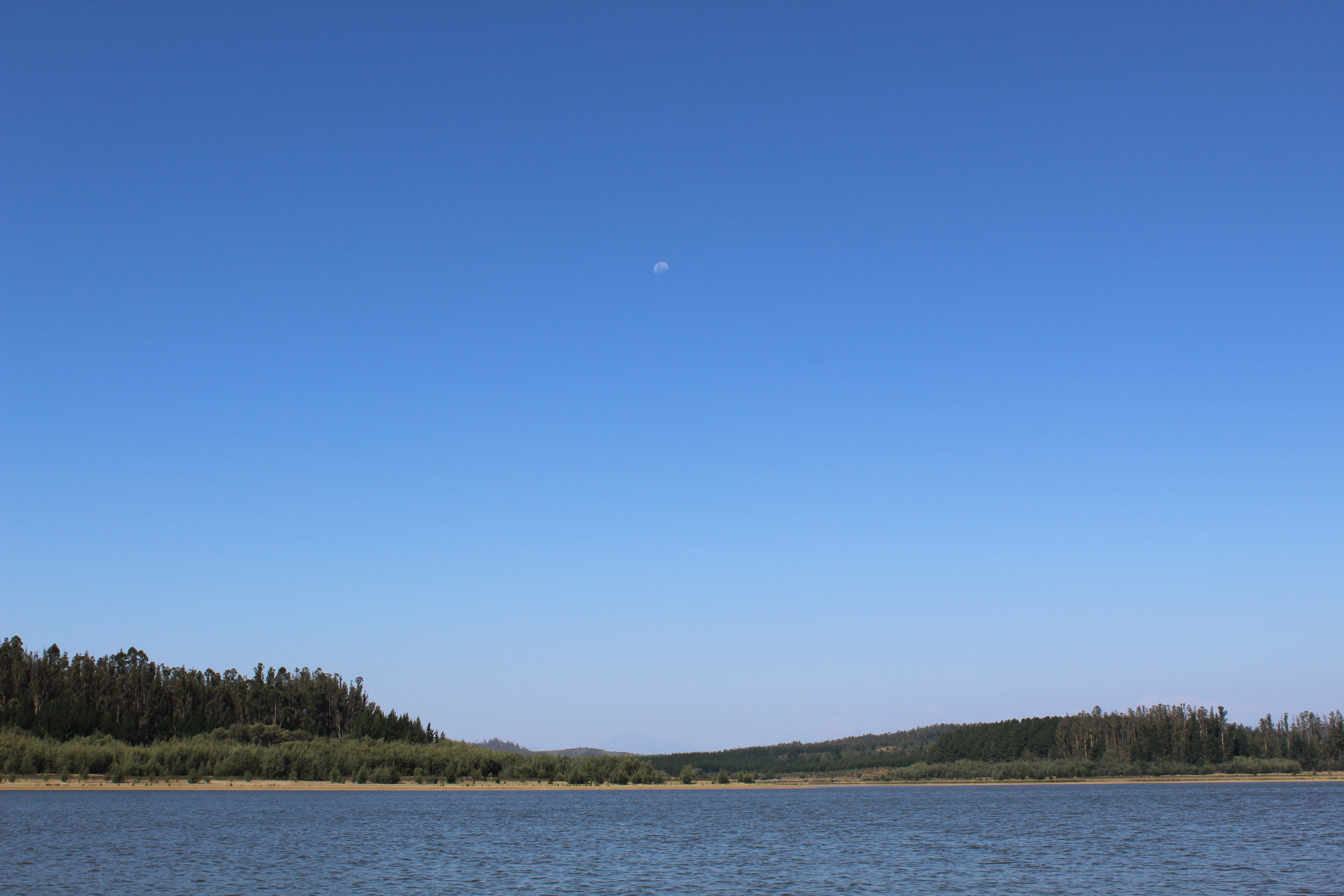
Lago Peñuelas National Reserve.

== See also ==
- Cuesta La Dormida
- List of environment topics
- World Network of Biosphere Reserves
