= Peñuelas Lake =

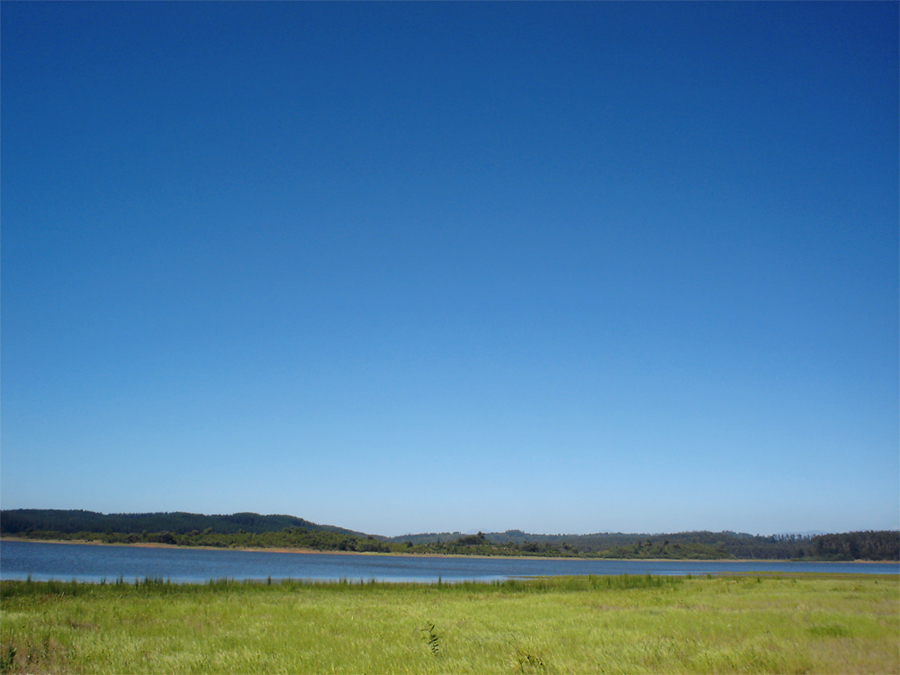

- Location within Chile
- Coordinates: 33°09′S 71°32′W
- Type: Reservoir
- Basin countries: Chile
- Water volume: 0.025 km^{3} (20,000 acre⋅ft)

Peñuelas Lake is a reservoir in Valparaíso Region, Chile. It supplies drinking water, together with another lake called Los Aromos, to Valparaíso and Viña del Mar. The reservoir and the surrounding area are protected within Lago Peñuelas National Reserve, which is part of La Campana-Peñuelas Biosphere Reserve.

At the end of March 2022, the lake dried up due to a drought lasting since 2010.
