= Lago Peñuelas National Reserve =

National reserve in the Valparaíso Region of Chile

- IUCN category IV (habitat/species management area)
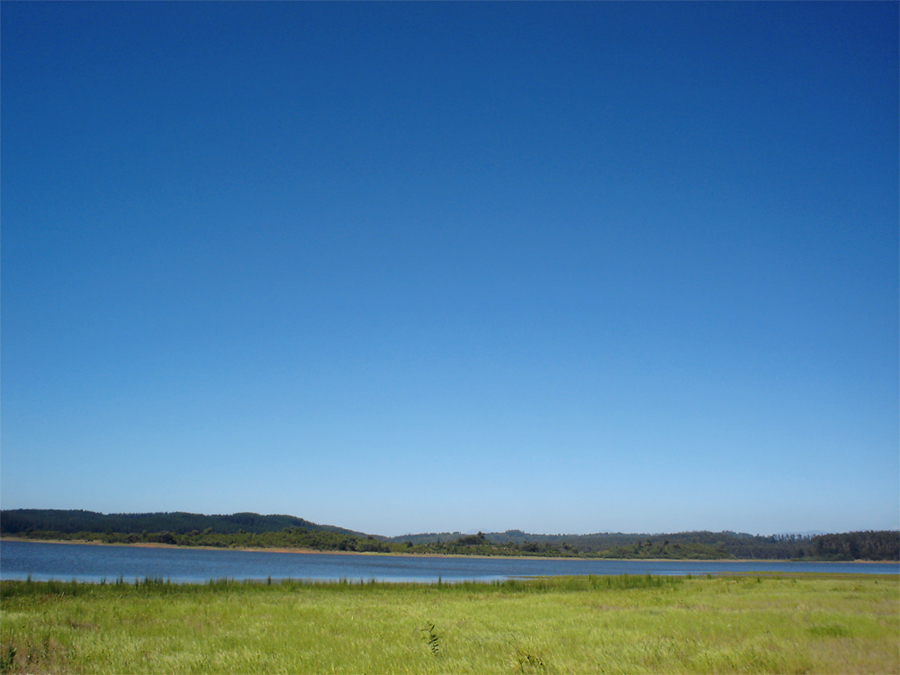
- Peñuelas Lake
- Interactive map of Lago Peñuelas National Reserve
- Location: Chile
- Nearest city: Valparaíso
- Coordinates: 33°10′S 71°29′W
- Area: 92.6 km^{2} (35.8 sq mi)
- Established: 1952
- Governing body: Corporación Nacional Forestal

Lago Peñuelas National Reserve is a national reserve of Chile. The reserve was created around Peñuelas Lake, a freshwater reservoir that provides drinking water to Valparaíso and Viña del Mar. The park, which is located in the Valparaíso Region of Chile, was declared a protected area in the year 1952 in order to protect the drainage of the Peñuelas reservoir and dam, built at the end of the 19th and beginning of the Twentieth century. The park, along with La Campana National Park to its north, was designated Campana-Peñuelas Biosphere Reserve by UNESCO in 1984.

The park covers an area of 9,260 hectares (35.7 square miles) and is traversed by about 12 km of Chile Route 68, which is the main highway between Valparaíso and Santiago. Its elevation ranges between 337 and 613 metres AMSL.

== National System of Protected Wild Areas of the State ==
In Chile there is the National System of Protected Wild Areas of the State (SNASPE), which includes three categories: National Parks, National Reserves and Natural Monuments. Currently the Lago Penuelas National Reserve is under this protection. This unit, together with the La Campana National Park, constitute a Biosphere Reserve for studying the flora of this area. The study has recorded approximately 150 species of native species, a rich flora compared with other native forests in the zone are also recorded.

In addition 14 of 300 (total) are conservation issues (2 endangered, 11 vulnerable, and 1 insufficiently known).

== Flora and fauna ==
The flora of the reserve includes mixed forest, riparian scrub, and deciduous forest and thorny scrub. Exotic tree species are planted in the reserve, including Eucalyptus globulus and Pinus radiata.

A total of 120 bird species have been recorded in the reserve. Leopardus colocolo, Galictis cuja, Conepatus chinga, Lycalopex culpaeus and Lycalopex griseus are mammal species that can be found here.

== Climate of the reserve ==
The climate of this area is Mediterranean typical with maritime influence.

The temperature varies because of the influence of the sea, the annual temperatures are between 12 degrees Celsius (54 degrees Fahrenheit) and 18 degrees Celsius (64 degrees Fahrenheit). There is occasional precipitation with the highest amount in winter and beginning at the end of autumn and extending until August. 80% of the rain is recorded between May and August.
