= Vizcachas Mountains =

Mountain range in Chile

The Vizcachas Mountains is a mountain range northwest of Santiago, in the Santiago Metropolitan Region, Chile. It is part of the Chilean Coast Ranges System.

== La Campana National Park ==
Part of the Vizcachas Range was incorporated into a protected area contiguous with La Campana National Park, under a recommendation made in 1993; this protection was applied to assist in maintaining biodiversity in a region which has had pressure to the ecosystem from an expanding human population.

In particular, the endangered and endemic Chilean Wine Palm (Jubaea chilensis) is native here. This species has experienced a shrinking range during historic times.

== See also ==
- Acacia caven
