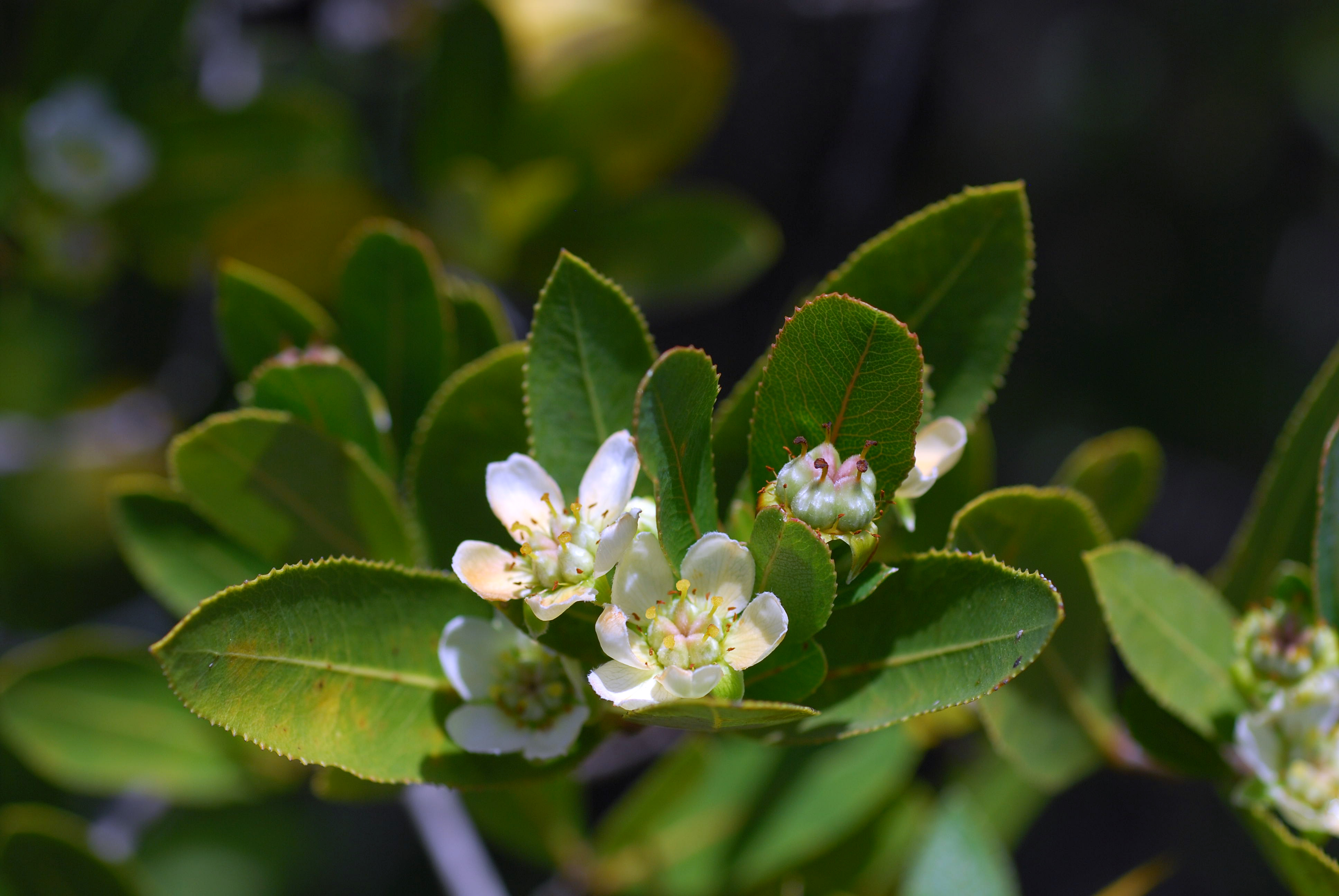

Conservation status
- Least Concern (IUCN 3.1)

Scientific classification
- Kingdom: Plantae
- Clade: Tracheophytes
- Clade: Angiosperms
- Clade: Eudicots
- Clade: Rosids
- Order: Rosales
- Family: Rosaceae
- Genus: Kageneckia
- Species: K. oblonga

Binomial name
- Kageneckia oblonga Ruiz & Pav.

Synonyms
- Kageneckia crataegifolia Lindl.; Kageneckia crataegoides D.Don; Kageneckia ovata Colla; Lydaea lyday Molina

= Kageneckia oblonga =

Species of tree

Kageneckia oblonga (also known as bollen) is a species of flowering plant in the family Rosaceae. It is an evergreen tree endemic to Chile. It grows from Coquimbo to Malleco (29 to 38°S). Example occurrences are found specifically found in central Chile within the La Campana National Park and Cerro La Campana forest areas. In these areas the endangered Chilean Wine Palm, Jubaea chilensis is an associated tree species.

== Description ==
It is an evergreen small tree or shrub that measures up to 5 m (16 ft) tall, the leaves are alternate, very leathery, with toothed edge and oblong shaped, the leaves are petiolate, yellowish-green, about 3–6 cm long. The flowers are unisexual star-shaped and white, solitary or clustered in axillary inflorescences. The calyx is formed by 5 sepals, the corolla is made up by 5 petals. The male ones have 15-20 stamens. The fruit is a pentamerous star-shaped capsule, about 2–3 cm in diameter. The seeds are winged.

== Uses ==
The wood is very hard and it is used for elaborating tools, in traditional medicine it is used as emetic and laxative.

== Etymology ==
Kageneckia in honour of Frederick von Kageneck, Austrian ambassador to Madrid. Oblonga refers to the shape of the leaves.
