= Chicauma =

Mountain range in central Chile

- Sierra de Chicauma
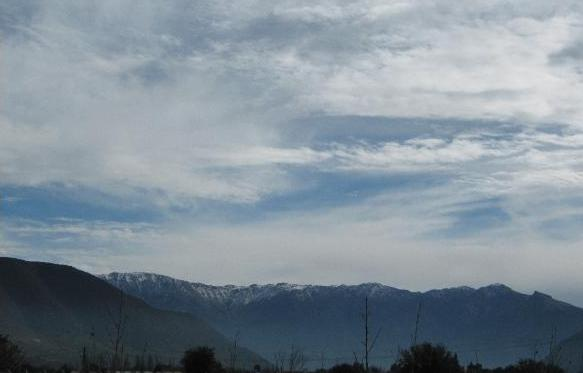

Highest point
- Elevation: 2,031 m (6,663 ft)

Geography
- Location within Chile
- Country: Chile
- Range coordinates: 33°11′03″S 70°58′38″W
- Parent range: Andes

Chicauma is a mountain range in central Chile. This locale is noted for the impact of a large meteor noted in a report from 1916. The range is also termed Alto de Chicauma or Sierra de Chicauma. A portion of the Chicauma has been added to the La Campana National Park.

== See also ==
- Cerro La Campana
- Kageneckia oblonga
