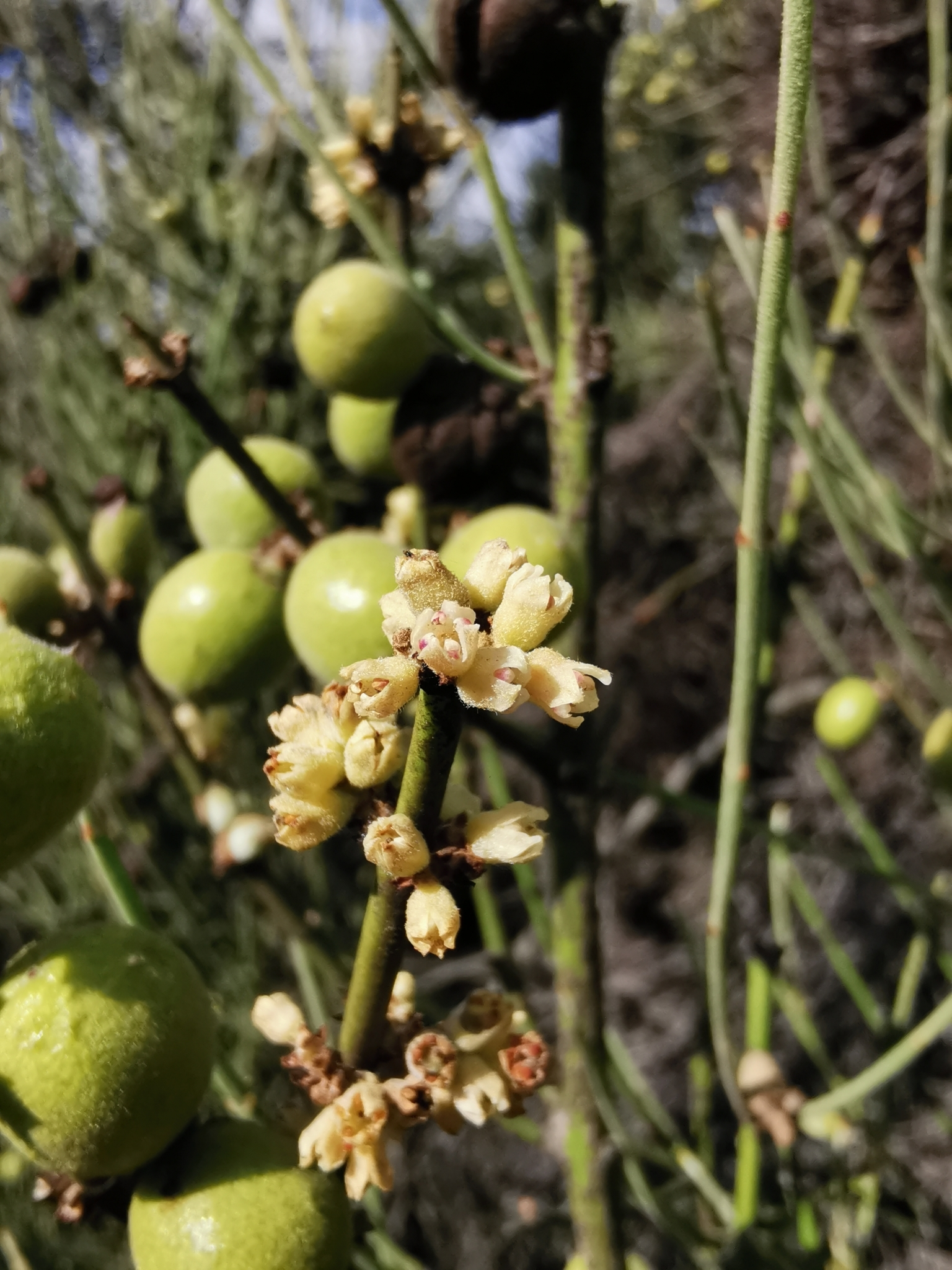
- Retanilla ephedra

Scientific classification
- Kingdom: Plantae
- Clade: Tracheophytes
- Clade: Angiosperms
- Clade: Eudicots
- Clade: Rosids
- Order: Rosales
- Family: Rhamnaceae
- Tribe: Colletieae
- Genus: Retanilla (DC.) Brongn.

= Retanilla =

Genus of flowering plants

Retanilla is a genus of flowering plants in the family Rhamnaceae, native to Chile, Peru, and Argentina. The species in this genus are actinorhizal plants.

== Taxonomy ==
Retanilla comprises the following species:

- Retanilla ephedra (Vent.) Brongn.
- Retanilla patagonica (Speg.) Tortosa
- Retanilla stricta Hook. & Arn.
- Retanilla trinervia (Gillies & Hook.) Hook. & Arn.
