= Tiltil =

Tiltlil
- City and Commune
- Coat of arms Location in Chile
- Coordinates (city): 33°04′54″S 70°55′40″W
- Country: Chile
- Region: Santiago Metro
- Province: Chacabuco

Government
  - Type: Municipality
  - Alcalde: Nelson Orellana Urzúa (IND)

Area
  - Total: 653 km^{2} (252 sq mi)

Population (2002 Census)
  - Total: 14,755
  - Density: 22.6/km^{2} (58.5/sq mi)
  - Urban: 8,161
  - Rural: 6,594

Sex
  - Men: 7,609
  - Women: 7,146
- Time zone: UTC-4 (CLT)
  - Summer (DST): UTC-3 (CLST)
- Area code: +56
- Website: Municipality of Tiltil

Tiltil or Til-Til is a Chilean municipality and city, in the Chacabuco Province, Santiago Metropolitan Region. Tiltil is most known for being an execution place for rebels during Chile's independence war against Spain. Manuel Rodríguez was executed in Tiltil.

== Demographics ==
According to the 2002 census of the National Statistics Institute, Tiltil spans an area of 653 km^{2} (252 sq mi) and has 14,755 inhabitants (7,609 men and 7,146 women). Of these, 8,161 (55.3%) lived in urban areas and 6,594 (44.7%) in rural areas. The population grew by 14.9% (1,917 persons) between the 1992 and 2002 censuses.

== Administration ==
As a commune, Tiltil is a third-level administrative division of Chile administered by a municipal council, headed by an alcalde who is directly elected every four years. The 2012-2016 alcalde is Nelson Orellana Urzúa (IND). The council has the following members:

- Cornelio Báez Arias (PC)
- Eva Aburto Gajardo (UDI)
- Berta Bugueño Lizama (PRI)
- Marina Almanzar Allendes (PRSD)
- Fermín Astorga Hidalgo (PS)
- Bárbara González Zúñiga (IND)

Within the electoral divisions of Chile, Tiltil is represented in the Chamber of Deputies by Mr. Patricio Melero (UDI) and Mr. Gabriel Silber (PDC) as part of the 16th electoral district, (together with Colina, Lampa, Quilicura and Pudahuel). The commune is represented in the Senate by Guido Girardi Lavín (PPD) and Jovino Novoa Vásquez (UDI) as part of the 7th senatorial constituency (Santiago-West).

== Geography and ecology ==
Tiltil is situated at the base of the Cuesta La Dormida, a forested mountain area where vestiges of the Chilean Wine Palm, Jubaea chilensis, can be found; this palm was prehistorically much more widely distributed in central Chile.

Tiltil is located on a route that connects the coastal road and the Pan-American Highway. The road recently underwent extensive improvements and connects the Pan-American Highway with Valparaíso and Viña del Mar on the coast. The road is a favorite for travelers wanting to avoid the highway's many toll roads. Tiltil is home to a local hospital, a supermarket, soccer fields, shops, and many local artisan outlets. The Monument to Chilean patriot Manuel Rodríguez is located just to the south of Tiltil on the route to the Pan-American Highway and Polpaico. There is a rail line that connects Santiago to northern Chile that runs through Tiltil. The views and vistas of Tiltil are considered by travelers to be very good, with winter vistas of the Cordillera classified as panoramic.
