= Adiantum gertrudis =

Scientific classification
- Kingdom: Plantae
- Clade: Tracheophytes
- Division: Polypodiophyta
- Class: Polypodiopsida
- Order: Polypodiales
- Family: Pteridaceae
- Genus: Adiantum
- Species: A. gertrudis

Binomial name
- Adiantum gertrudis Espin.

Species of fern

Adiantum gertrudis is a threatened species of ferns in the Vittarioideae subfamily of the Pteridaceae that occurs in central South America. One locus of occurrence of A. gertrudis is within central Chile at the La Campana National Park. A morphological trait unique to A. gertrudis is the hairs covering its fronds.
