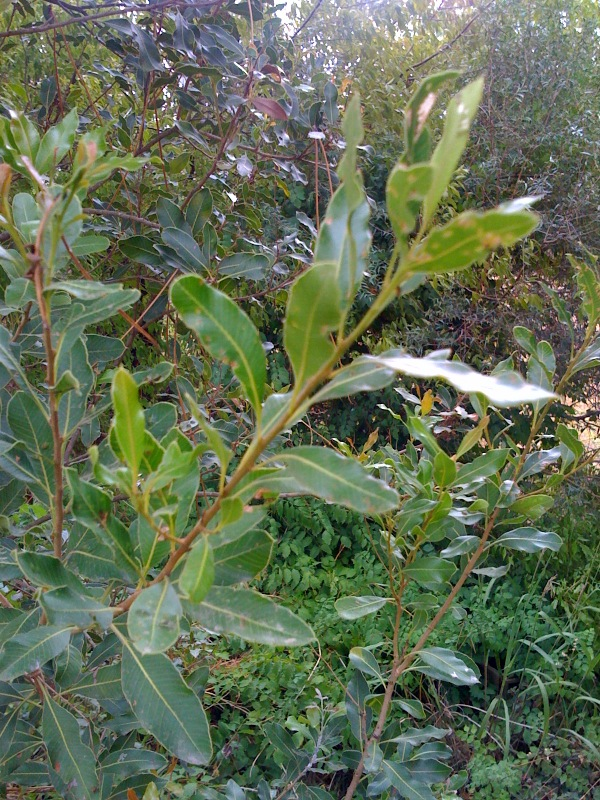

Scientific classification
- Kingdom: Plantae
- Clade: Tracheophytes
- Clade: Angiosperms
- Clade: Eudicots
- Clade: Rosids
- Order: Sapindales
- Family: Anacardiaceae
- Genus: Lithraea
- Species: L. molleoides

Binomial name
- Lithraea molleoides (Vell.) Engl.

Synonyms
- Synonymy: Lithraea molleoides var. lorentziana Lillo; Lithraea ternifolia; Schinus brasiliensis Marchand ex Cabrera; Schinus leucocarpus M.; Schinus molleoides (Vell.) Engler; Lithraea aroeirinha Marchand ex Warm.

= Lithraea molleoides =

Species of plant

Lithraea molleoides is a tree (2.5 and 8 m tall) that is native to South America, specially in Argentina, Uruguay, Bolivia, and the Cerrado vegetation of Brazil.

== Landscaping ==
The plant is commonly considered as unsuitable to landscaping, as it is a poisonous plant: it produces volatile substances that propagate from touching the leaves, through contact with droplets, or through the tree's pollen. These substances are allergenic and contact with them may produce general allergic sensitivity, skin disease, fever, and visual problems. Planting this tree where it can be accessible to the general public is therefore strongly discouraged.

== Popular custom ==
In Uruguay, folk tradition states that people are supposed to salute the tree in a way according to the time of day. For example, if somebody encounters the tree during the day, they are supposed to say "Good night, Mr. (or Mrs.) Aruera". Similarly, if it is during the night, they would say "Good day, Mr. Aruera".
