= Ocoa Valley =

Valley in Chile

The Ocoa Valley is a landform in central Chile located by the La Campana National Park. This valley is a locus where considerable archaeological recovery has taken place, yielding considerable finds of pre-European contact period. According to Dallman and Hogan, some of the greatest stands of the endangered Chilean Wine Palm, Jubaea chilensis are found on the slopes of La Campana that rise up from the Ocoa Valley.

== See also ==
- Cerro La Campana
- Chilean Wine Palm
