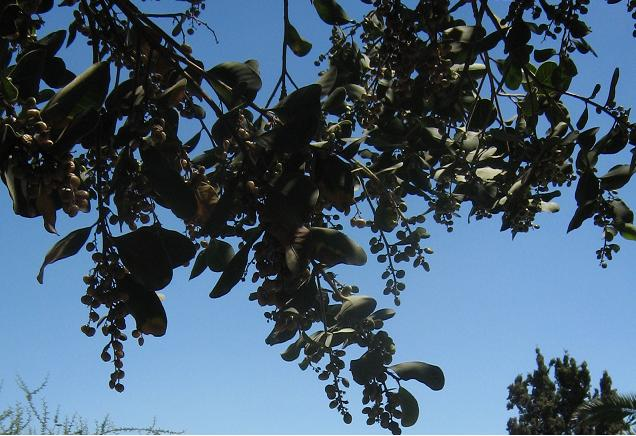
- Lithraea caustica

Scientific classification
- Kingdom: Plantae
- Clade: Tracheophytes
- Clade: Angiosperms
- Clade: Eudicots
- Clade: Rosids
- Order: Sapindales
- Family: Anacardiaceae
- Subfamily: Anacardioideae
- Genus: Lithraea; Miers ex Hook. & Arn.

Species
- Lithraea brasiliensis Lithraea caustica Lithraea molleoides

Synonyms
- Lithrea Miers ex Hook. & Arn.

= Lithraea =

Genus of flowering plants

Lithraea is a genus of three species of flowering plants in the cashew family, Anacardiaceae. It is native to Argentina, Bolivia, Brazil, Chile, Paraguay, and Uruguay. They are dioecious trees with poisonous sap that can induce contact dermatitis.
