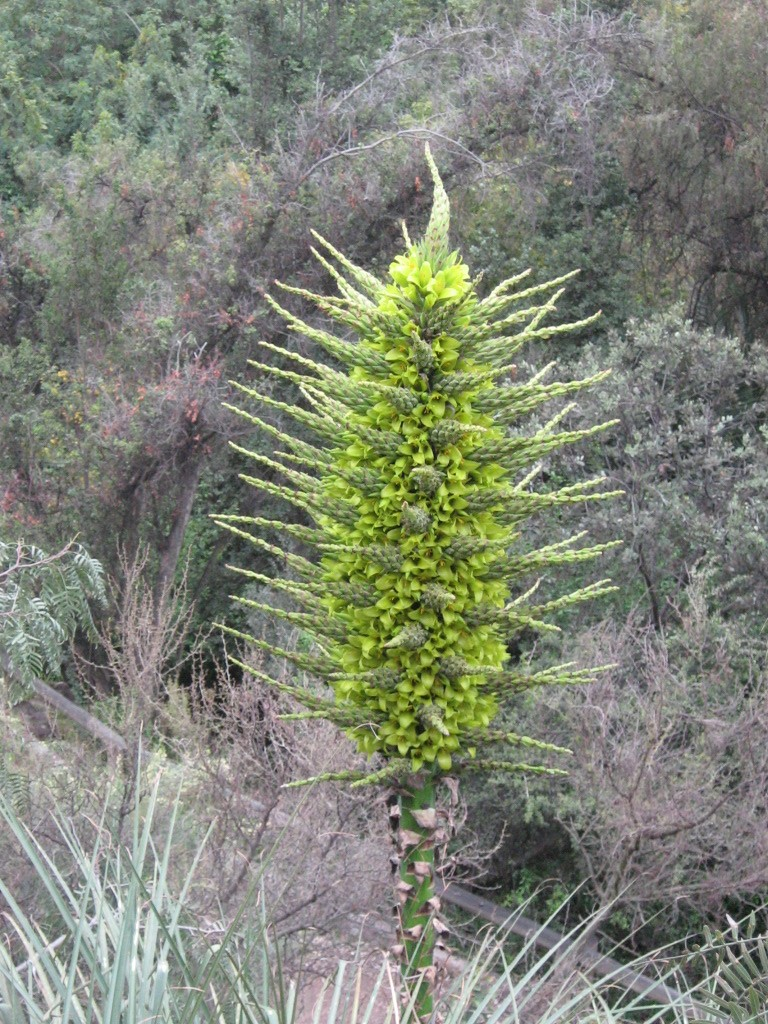

Scientific classification
- Kingdom: Plantae
- Clade: Tracheophytes
- Clade: Angiosperms
- Clade: Monocots
- Clade: Commelinids
- Order: Poales
- Family: Bromeliaceae
- Genus: Puya
- Species: P. chilensis

Binomial name
- Puya chilensis Molina

= Puya chilensis =

Species of plant

Puya chilensis is a species of terrestrial bromeliad. It is endemic to central Chile.

== Description ==
An evergreen perennial, it forms large, dense rosettes of grey-green, strap-like leaves edged with hooked spines. The green or yellow flowers are borne on spikes which resemble a medieval mace, and stand up to 2 m (6 ft 7 in) high. Spreading by offsets, Puya chilensis can colonise large areas over time. Growth is slow and plants may take 20 years or more to flower. The outer two-thirds of the leaf blade bears outward-pointing spines which may be an adaptation to prevent herbivores from reaching the centre of the plant. Fibres from the leaves are used to weave durable fishing-nets.

== Natural habitat ==
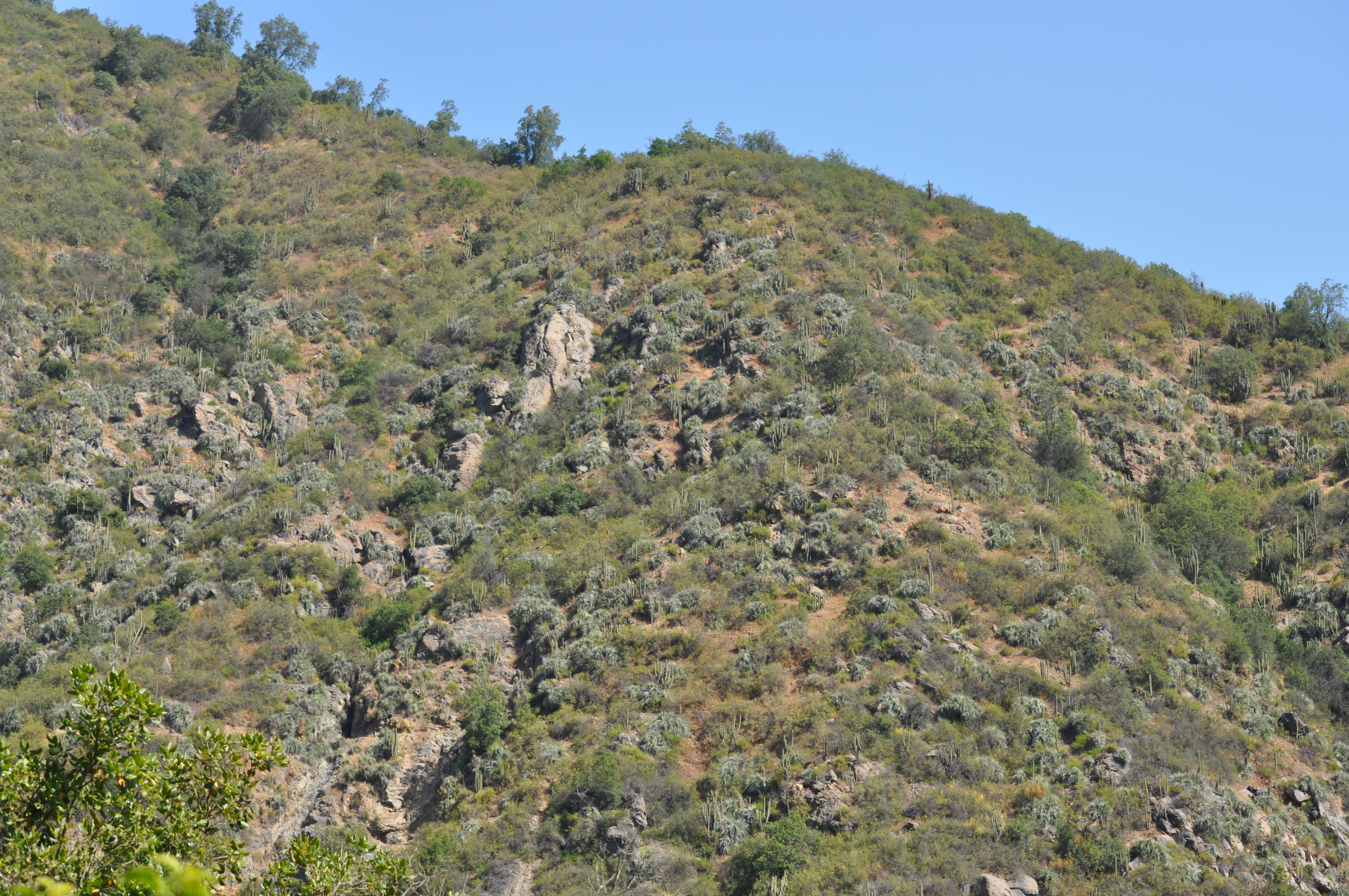
Puya chilensis growing in habitat at La Campana National Park

It is commonly found on arid hillsides of the Andes, on north-facing slopes of matorral areas at 300–1,000 m (980–3,280 ft) above sea level.

== Conservation ==
Puya chilensis is not considered threatened. It is also cultivated in many parts of the world. In its natural arid environment, plants can be highly flammable and are susceptible to damage from fires that are often the result of human action. Land clearance is an increasing threat.

== Gallery ==
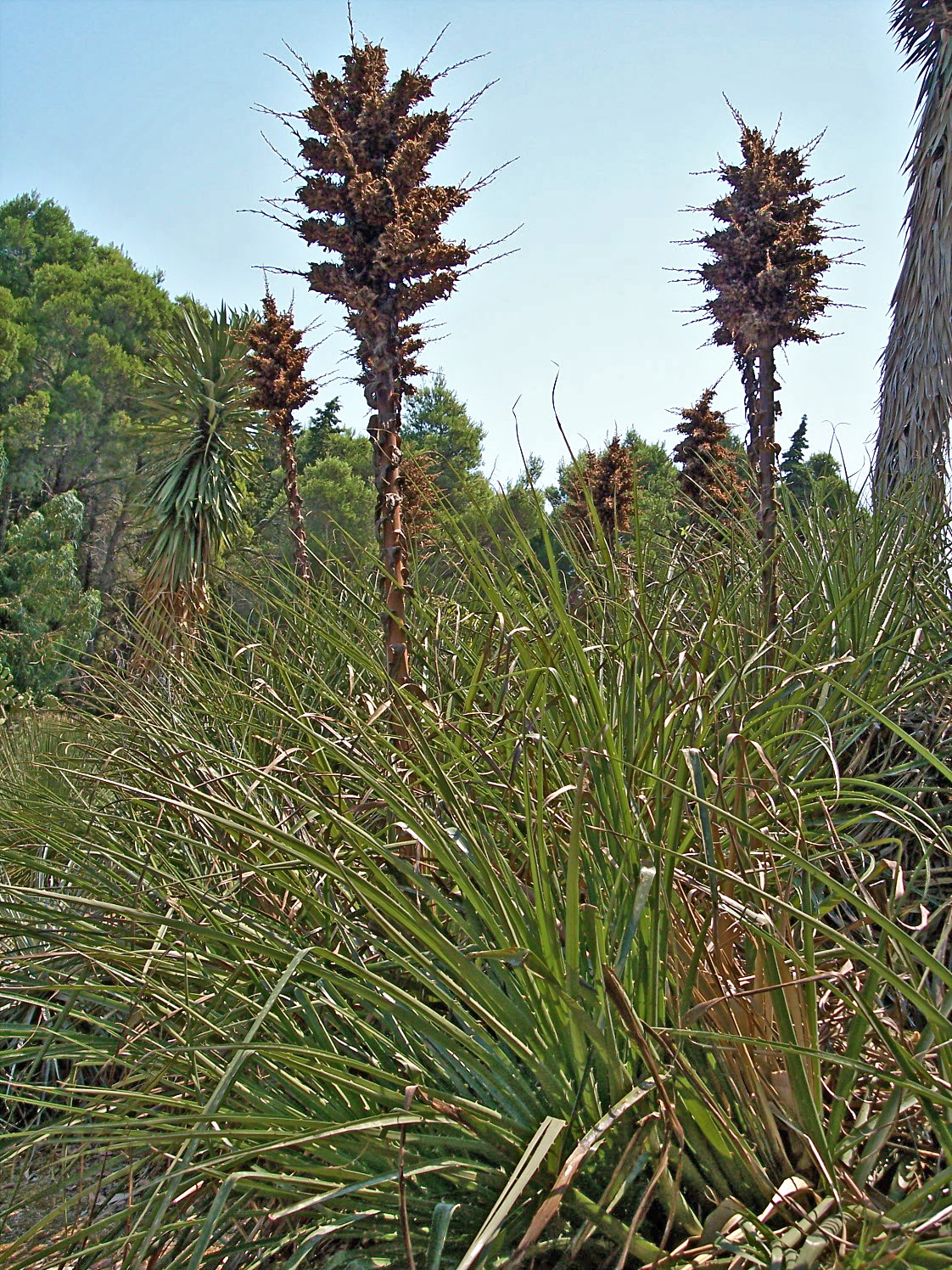

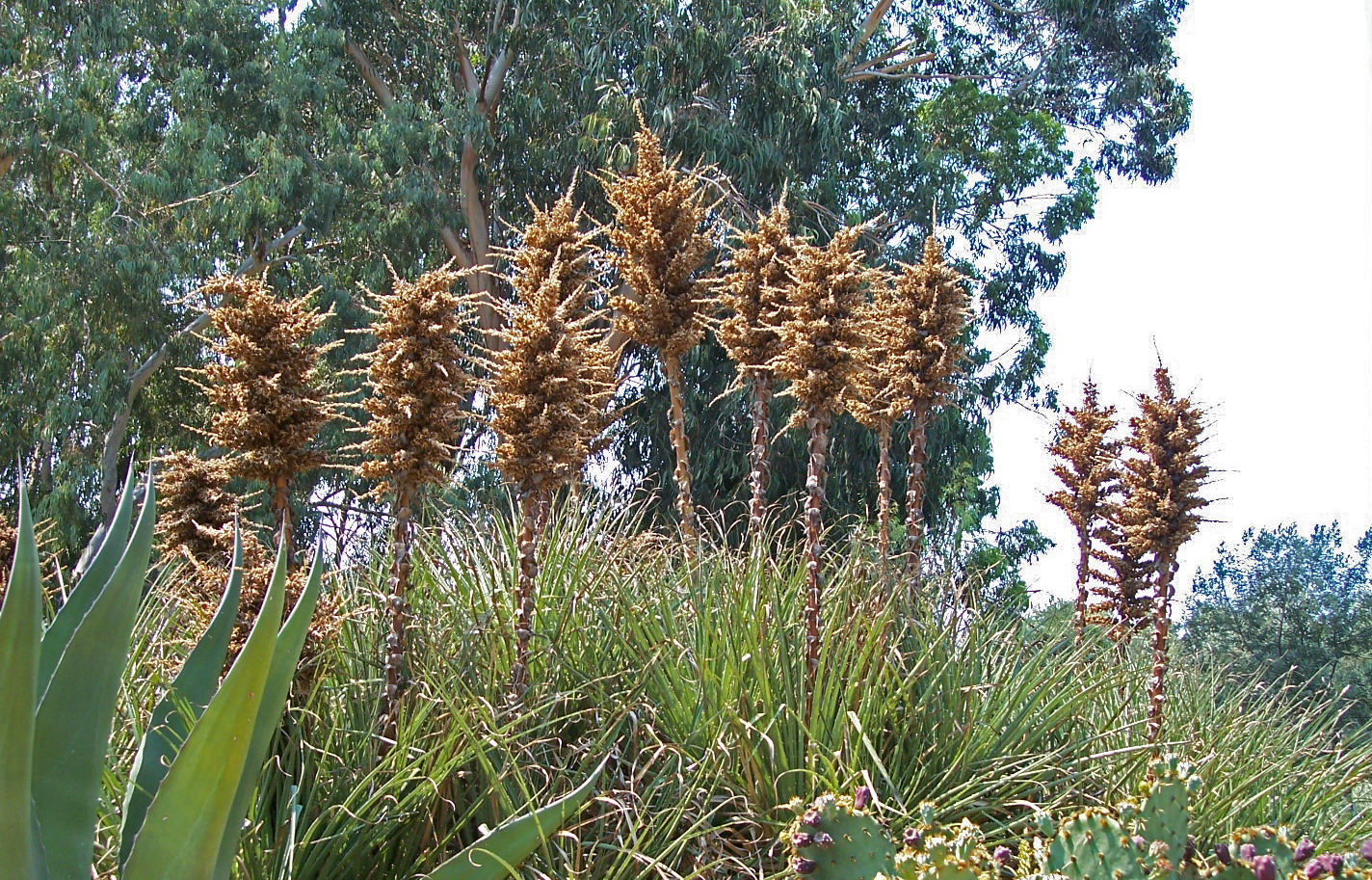

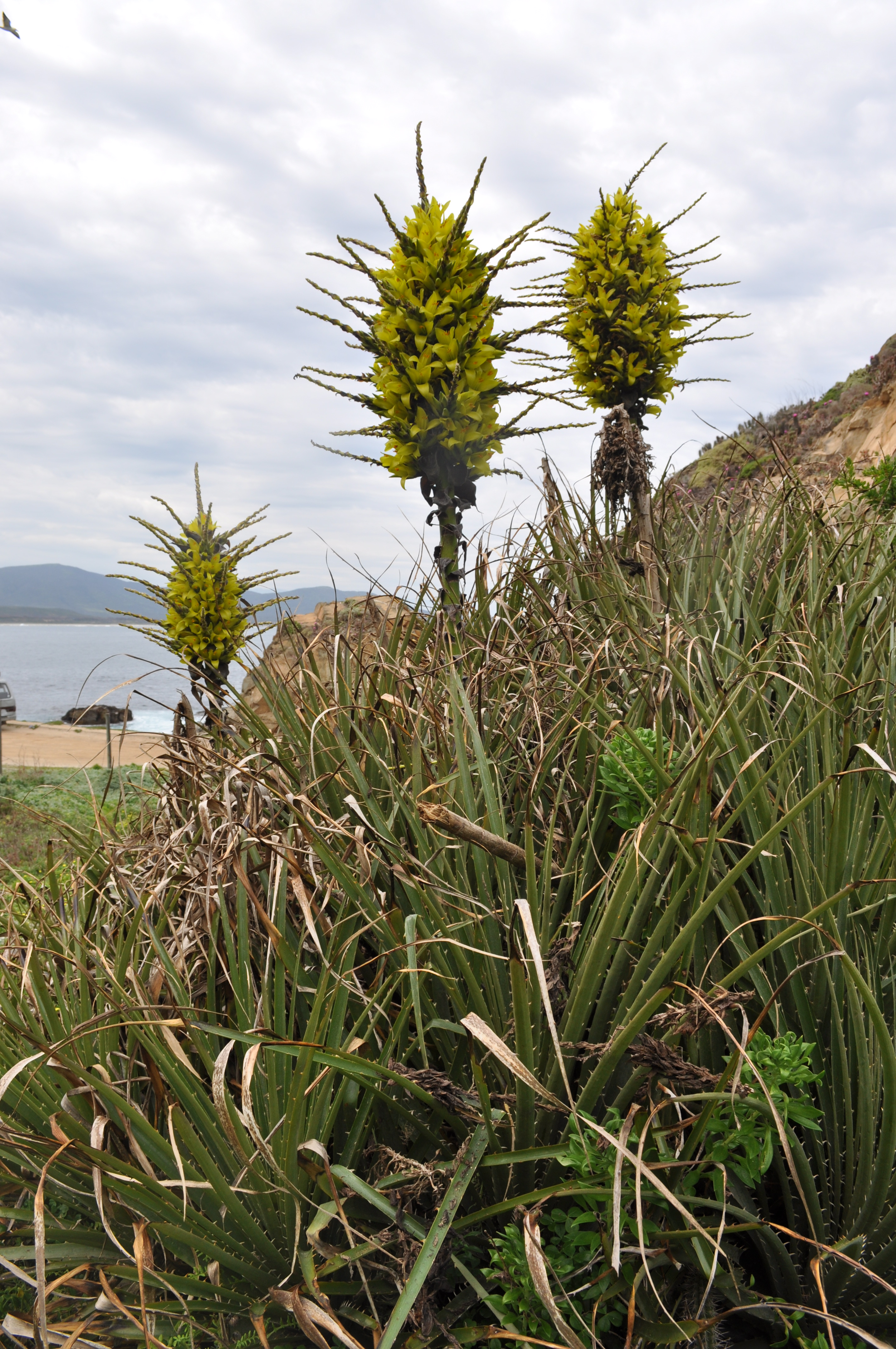

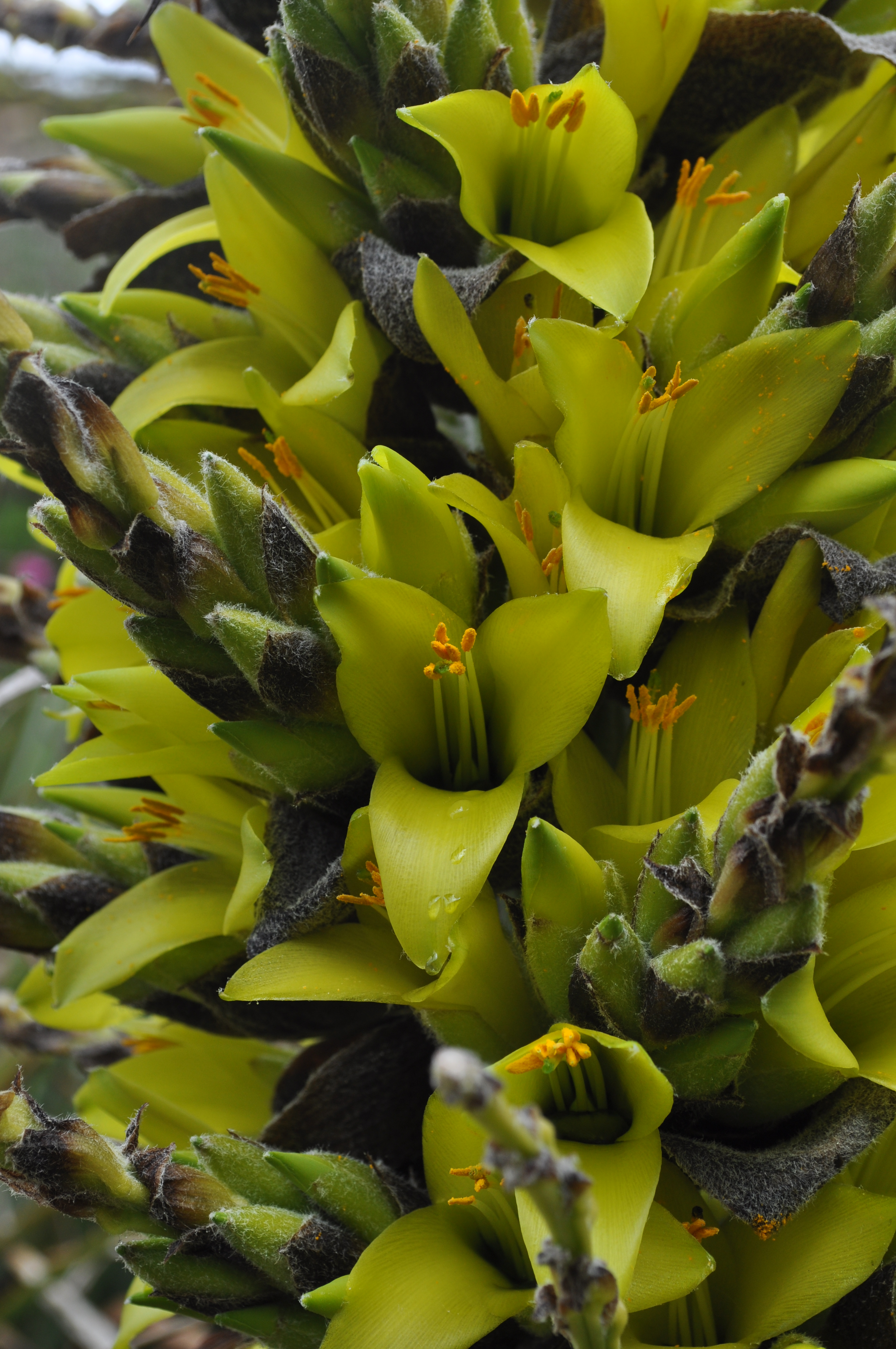

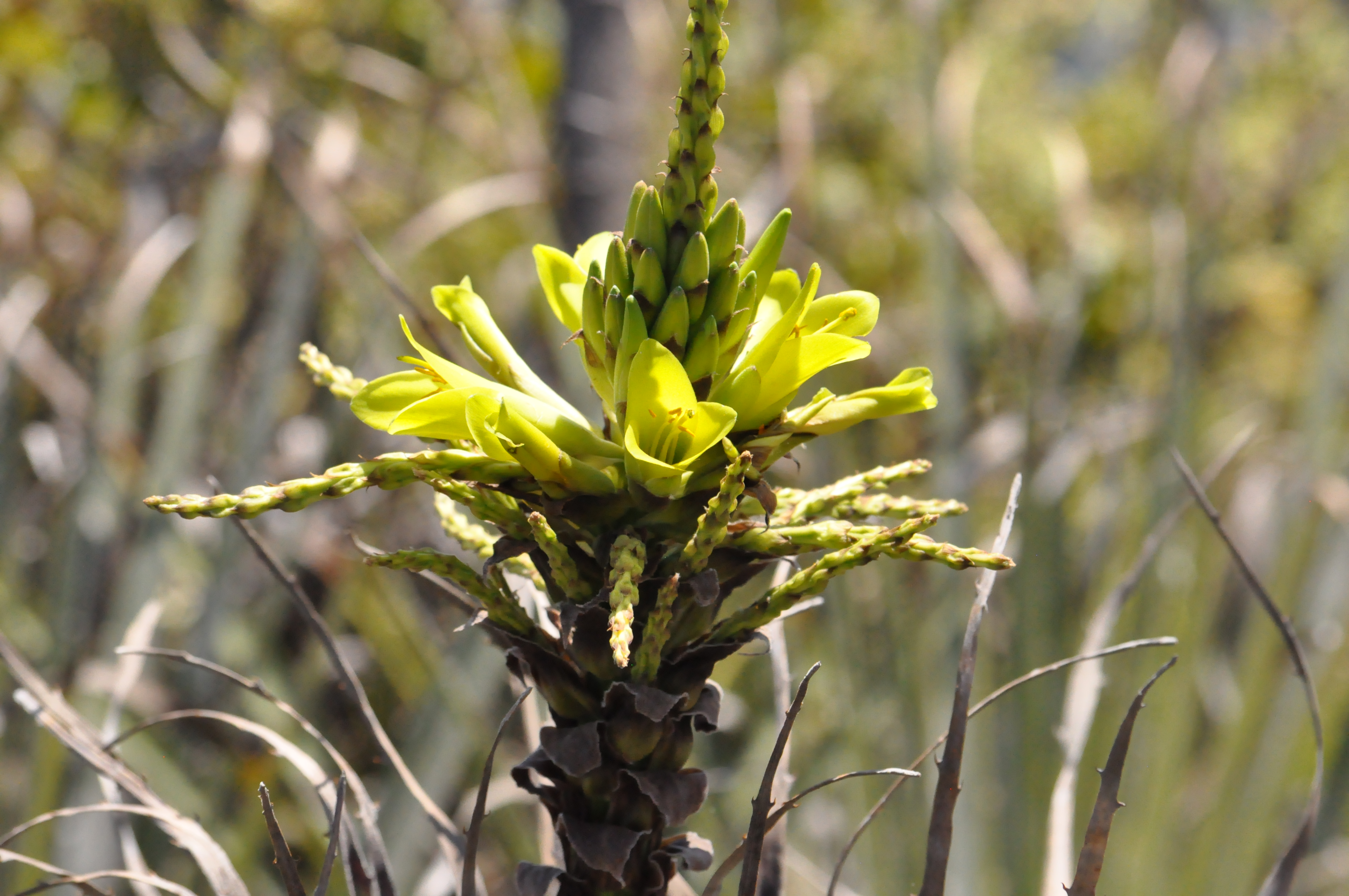

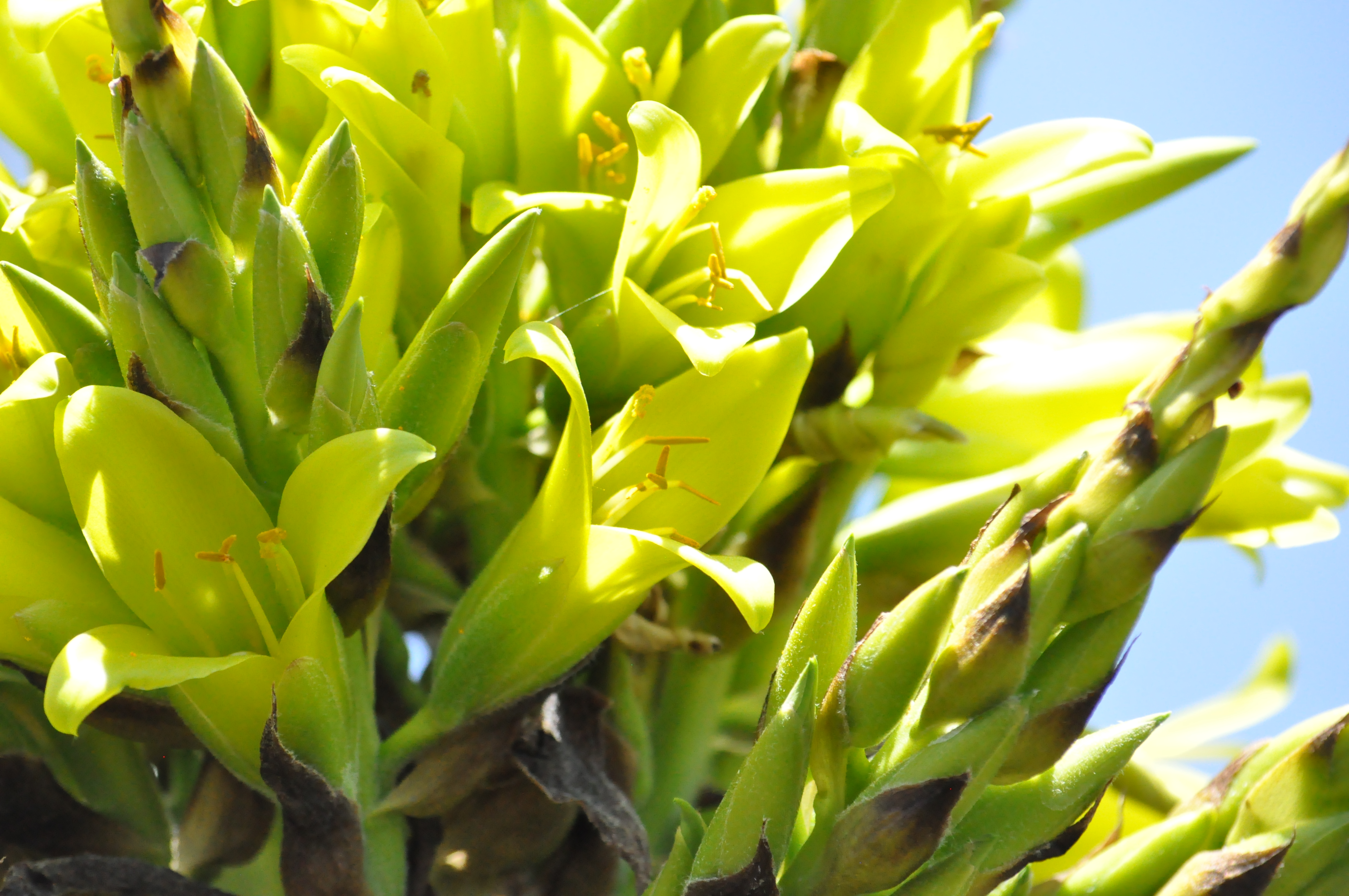

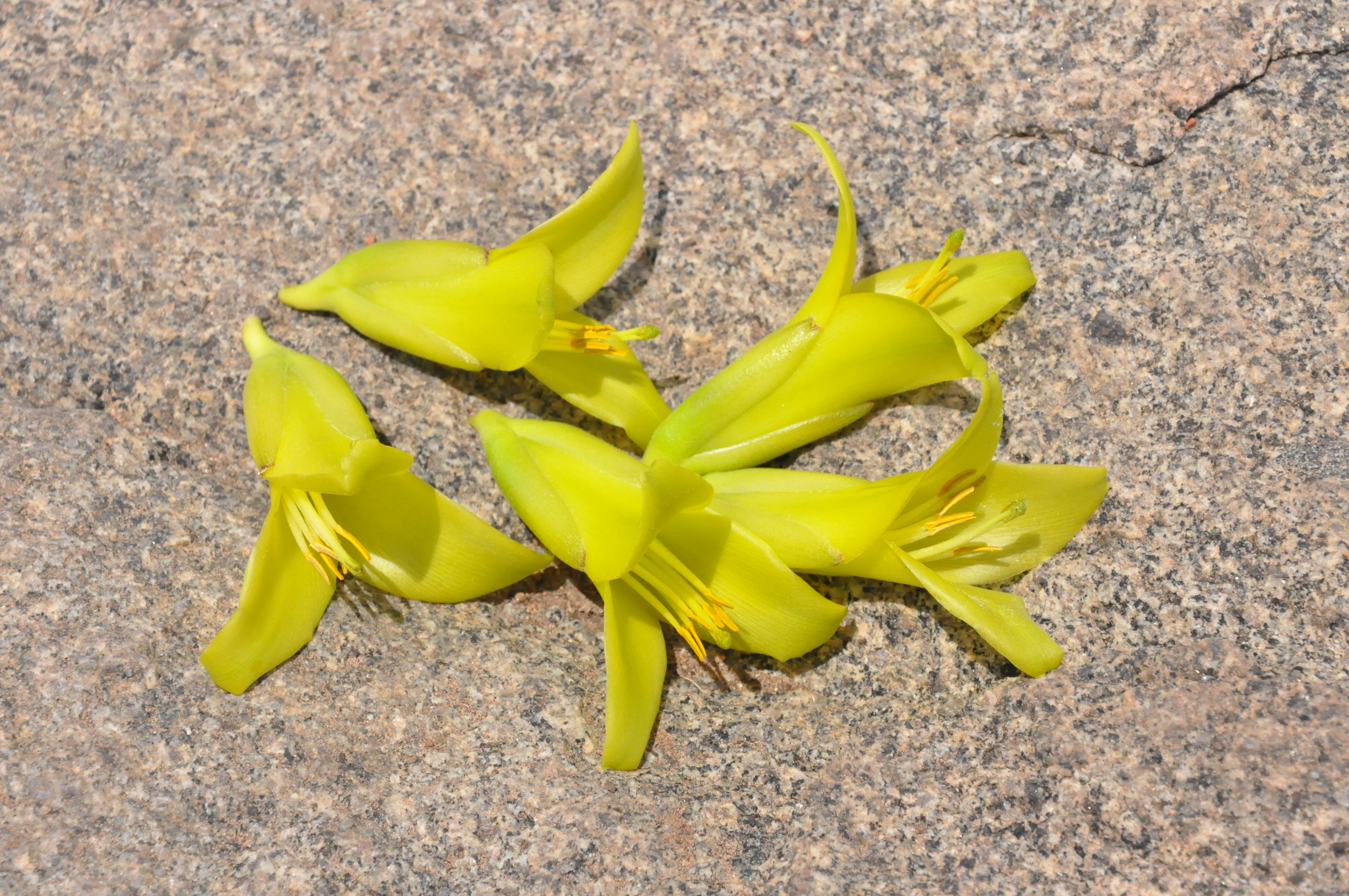

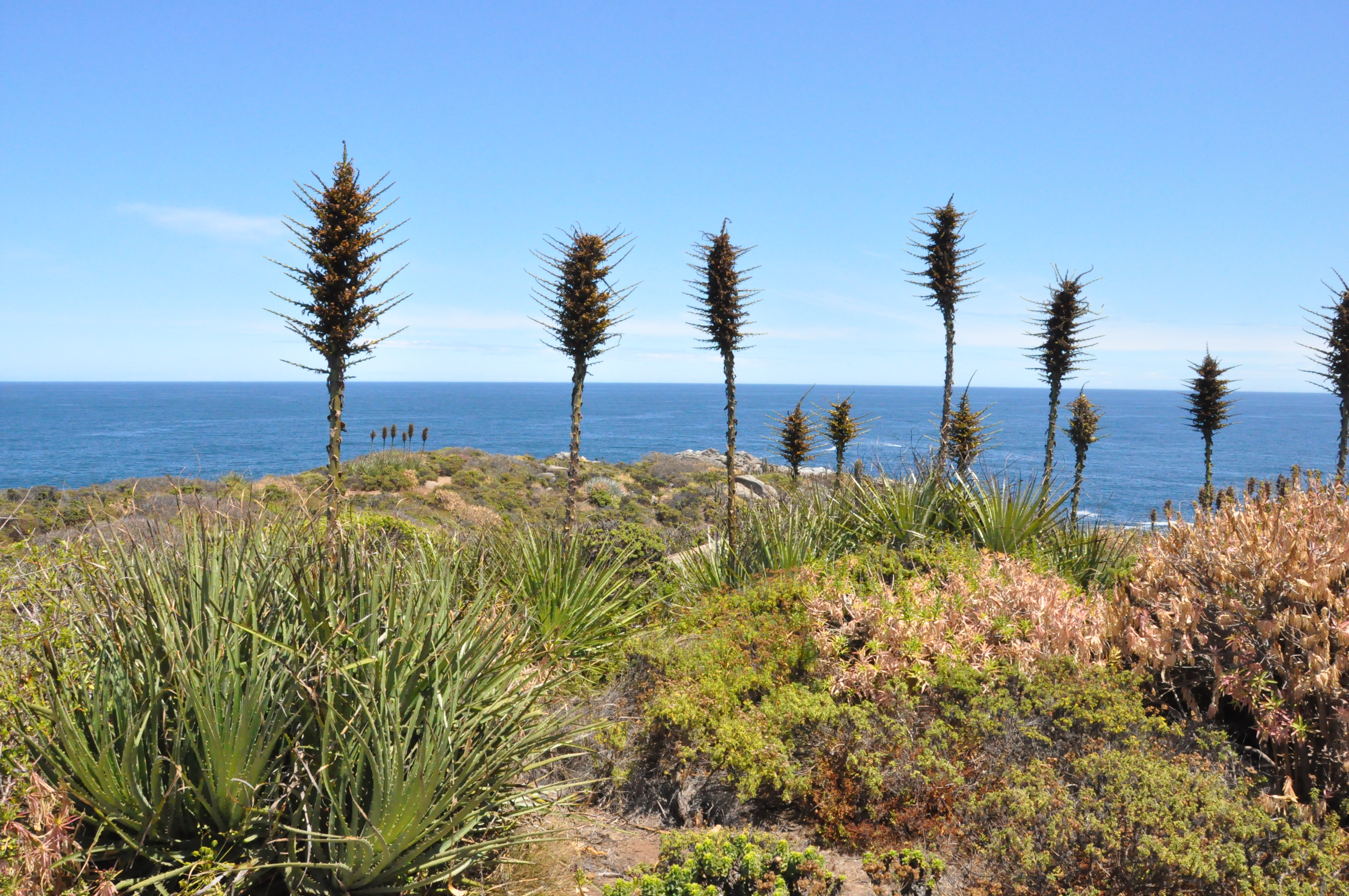

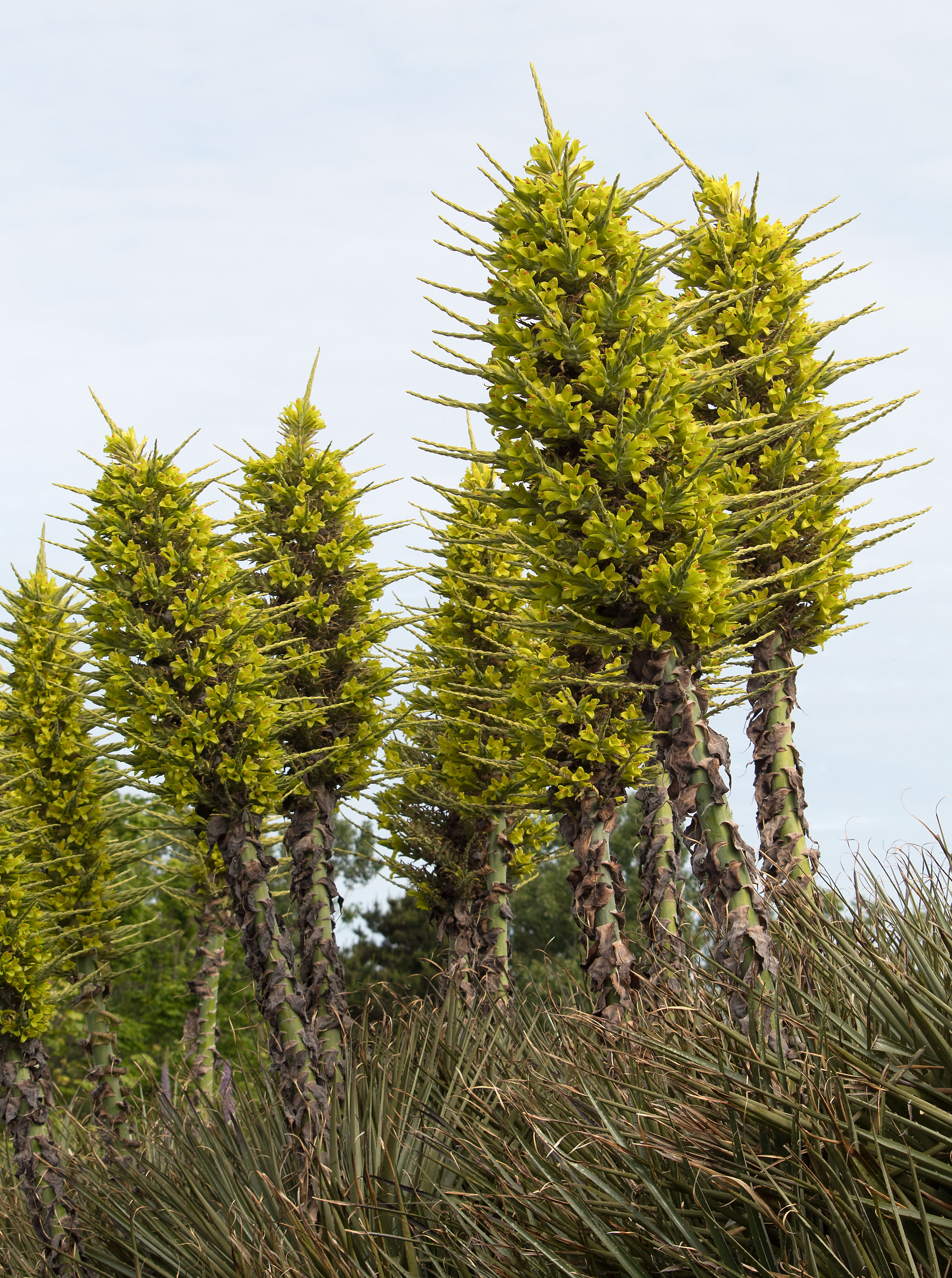
Puya chilensis
