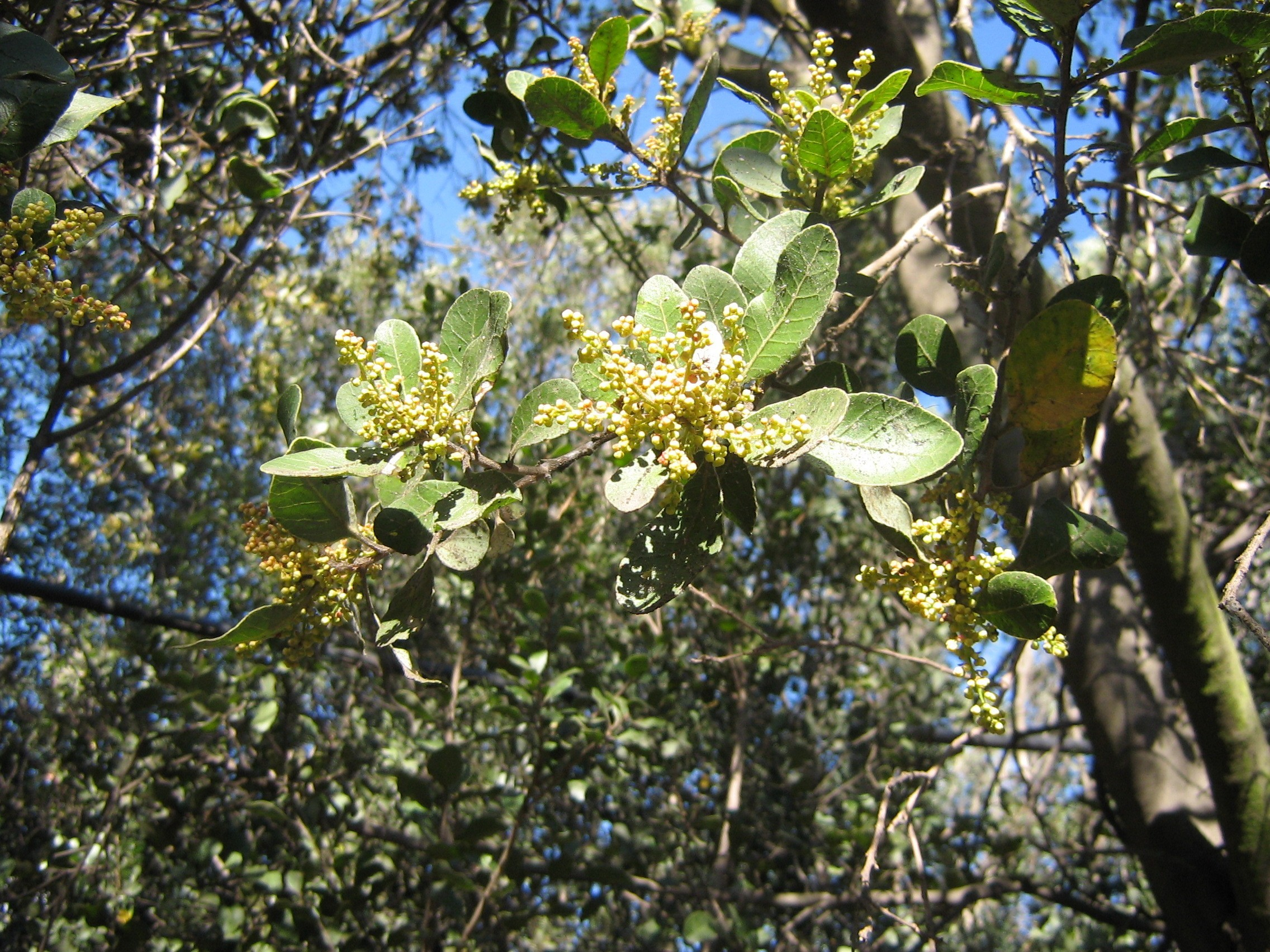

Scientific classification
- Kingdom: Plantae
- Clade: Tracheophytes
- Clade: Angiosperms
- Clade: Eudicots
- Clade: Rosids
- Order: Sapindales
- Family: Anacardiaceae
- Genus: Lithraea
- Species: L. caustica

Binomial name
- Lithraea caustica Hook. & Arn.

= Lithraea caustica =

Species of plant

Lithraea caustica (commonly known as the litre tree, and historically as llithi or liti) is a species of flowering plants in the soapberry family Anacardiaceae. This plant is endemic to central Chile; an example occurrence is in the area of La Campana National Park and Cerro La Campana. The tree is a well known human allergen and can cause a rash of the skin, the effects of and susceptibility to which can vary greatly among individuals.

== Description ==
Litre is evergreen, with oval leaves with a smooth or undulating border. It can grow to be a full tree when undisturbed; the tree-like formation was formerly common, but it is now most frequently found as a shrub due to changing patterns of land use. It has leathery leaves due to the high levels of lignin and cellulose. It grows large, underground burls from which new growth will emerge after it is cut or burned down; it shares this trait with most of the woody plants in its region.

== Toxicology ==
The leaves and branches of litre induces severe dermatitis after contact with human skin. The dermatitis characterized by swelling and itching in some people. The allergenic agent of litre is 3–pentadecyl (10–enyl) catechol (litreol), an urushiol similar in structure to the allergens from poison oak and poison ivy.

== Ecology ==
Litre grows in matorral climates (i.e., areas with similar climates to the southern Mediterranean); its range in Central Chile is the broadest of any matorral shrub in the region. It has been found to increase in abundance in response to grazing.

The plant propagates through the dispersal of seedlings. Instrumental in this dispersal are both birds (Turdus falcklandii, Mimus thenca, Phytotoma rara) and foxes (Pseudalopex spp.)

It is drought resistant, due to its deep and extensive root system.

Probably due to its toxicity, litre is one of the least disturbed plants in its habitats. The plant and its surrounding soil have been found to be home to 29 families, 57 genera and 69 species of beetles.

== Scientific History ==
Litre has been described in the scientific literature since at least the early 18th century. Explorer and botanist Louis Feuillée reported that sailors on his expedition experienced severe reactions after cutting down some 'Llithi' trees. It was given its first binomial name, Laurus caustica, by William Jackson Hooker and George Arnott Walker-Arnott in 1832.
