= Chacabuco Province =

Chacabuco Province Provincia de Chacabuco
- Province
- Seal

- Location in the Santiago Metropolitan Region

- Location in Chile
- Coordinates: 33°08′S 70°46′W
- Country: Chile
- Region: Santiago Metropolitan
- Capital: Colina
- Communes: Colina; Lampa; Til-Til

Area
  - Total: 2,076.1 km^{2} (801.6 sq mi)

Population (2024 Census)
  - Total: 338,195
  - Density: 162.90/km^{2} (421.91/sq mi)
- Time zone: UTC−4 (CLT)
  - Summer (DST): UTC-3 (CLST)
- Area code: 2
- Website: Delegation of Chacabuco

Chacabuco Province (Spanish: Provincia de Chacabuco) is one of six provinces of the Santiago Metropolitan Region in central Chile. It spans an area of 2,076.1 km^{2} (801.6 sq mi). Its capital is Colina. It had a population of 338,195 inhabitants as per the 2024 Chilean census.

== History ==
During the Chilean War of Independence, the Battle of Chacabuco was fought here on 12 February 1817, which resulted in the army led by José de San Martín against a Spanish force commanded by Rafael Maroto.

Chile was re-organized into twelve regions excluding the Santiago Metropolitan Area by Law No. 575 enacted on 10 July 1974. The Santiago Metropolitan Region was officially created as per Law No.3260, enacted on 3 March 1980, and was made up of six provinces including Chacabuco.

== Geography ==
Chacabuco Province is one of the six provinces of the Santiago Metropolitan Region in Chile. It is located in the northern part of the region, and covers an area of 2,076.1 km^{2} (801.6 sq mi). Most of the land area of the province belongs to the Maipo River basin. Only about 2,500 ha (6,200 acres) of the province is covered by forests, which forms two percent of the total land area.

Chacabuco has a warm Mediterranean climate (Köppen climate classification: Csb) with an average annual temperature of 15.54 °C (59.97 °F), and receives approximately 3.16 cm (1.24 in) of rainfall annually on average. However, temperatures in the summer reach 40 °C (104 °F) in the province, with few communes reaching as high as 45 °C (113 °F).

== Administration ==
As a province, Chacabuco is a second-level administrative division of Chile, governed by a provincial governor. It is further subdivided into three communes (comunas)–Colina, Lampa, and Til-Til. The city of Colina serves as the capital of the province.

== Demographics ==
According to the 2024 Chilean census, the province had a population of 338,195 inhabitants. The population consisted of 169,193 males (50.0%) and 169,002 females (50.0%). About 23.7% of the population was below the age of 15 years, 68.7% belonged to the age group of 15–64 years, and 7.6% was aged 65 years or older. The province had an urban population of 277,481 inhabitants (82.0%) and a rural population of 60,714 inhabitants (18.0%). Most of the residents were born in Chile, accounting for 295,956 inhabitants (87.5%). Indigenous people formed 23,001 inhabitants (6.8%) of the population, while 315,149 inhabitants (93.2%) identified themselves as non-indigenous. Roman Catholics formed the largest religious group with 137,201 adherents (53.5%), followed by Evangelicals or Protestants with 41,347 adherents (16.1%), and 69,861 inhabitants (27.3%) indicating no religious affiliation.
