= Cerro La Campana =

Mountain in Chile

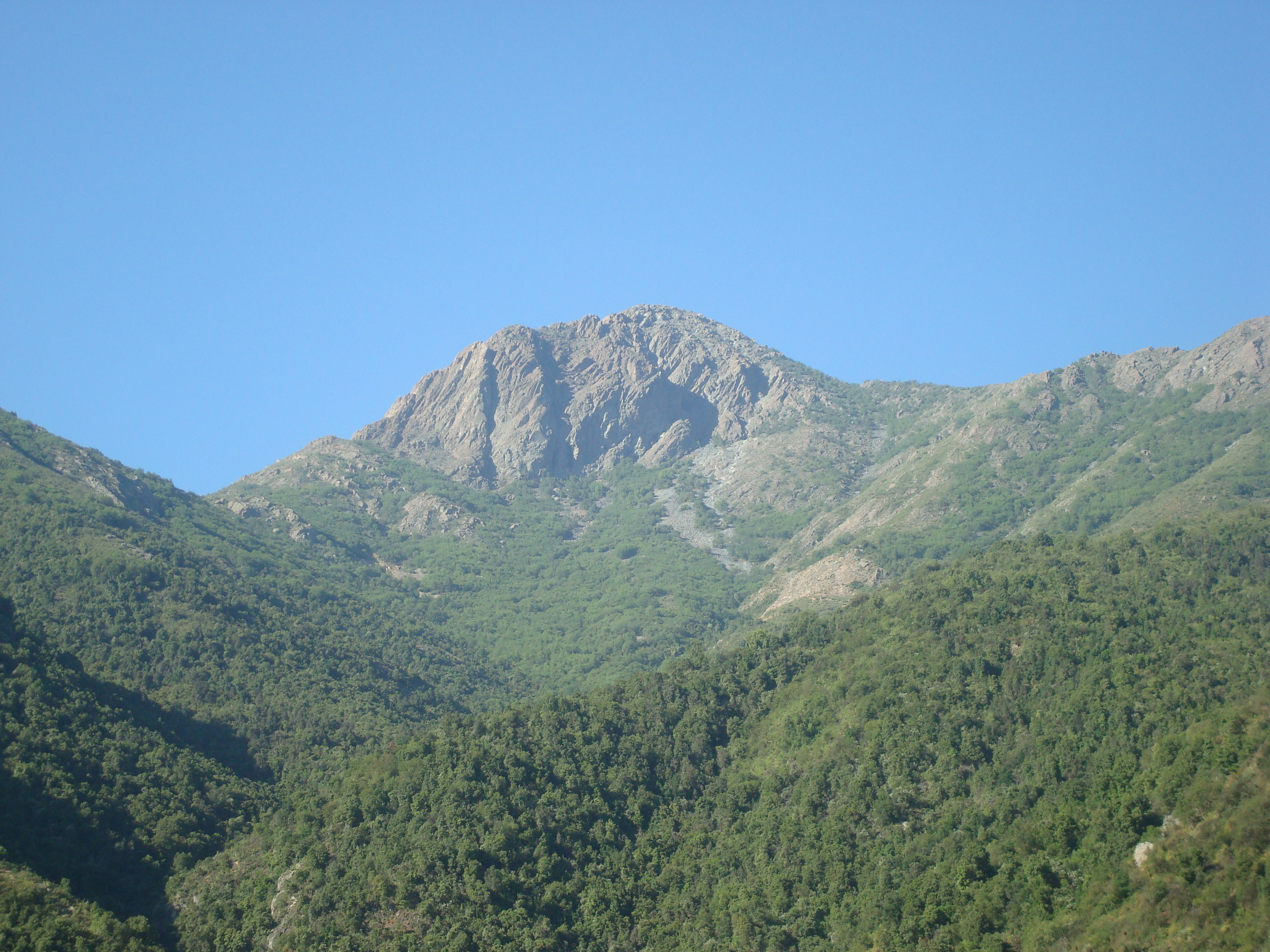

Highest point
- Elevation: 1,880 m (6,170 ft)
- Coordinates: 32°57′13″S 71°07′10″W

Geography
- Location: Chile
- Parent range: Andes

Climbing
- Easiest route: Sendero Andinista

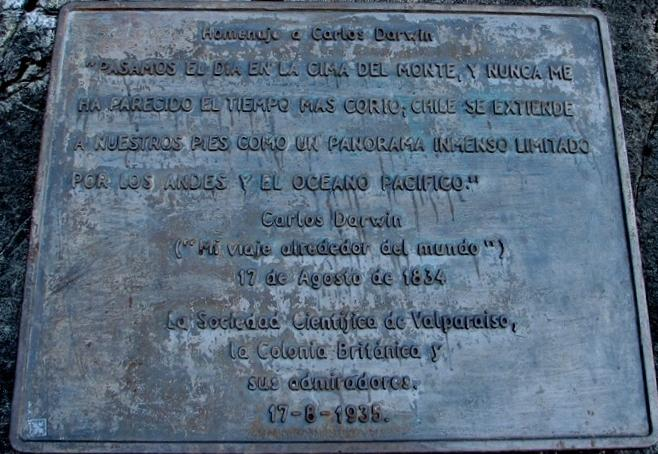
The plaque commemorating the visit by Charles Darwin

Cerro la Campana, the Bell mountain, is a mountain in La Campana National Park in central Chile. The Pacific and the mountain Aconcagua are visible from the summit on clear days.

Due to the area's expanding human population, considerable deforestation occurred on the previously heavily wooded areas of this mountain from approximately 1900 AD onwards. One of the significant tree species extant on Cerro La Campana is the Chilean Wine Palm, Jubaea chilensis; this endangered palm prehistorically had a much wider distribution.

When the second survey voyage of HMS Beagle arrived at Valparaíso on 23 July 1834, Charles Darwin took residence ashore to explore the area. On 14 August he obtained horses and set off with a companion "on a geological excursion" to the base of the Andes. They reached the Hacienda de San Isidro, sited at the foot of Cerro La Campana, and on the morning of 16 August after being given a guide and fresh horses they began their ascent. In his notes on the vegetation seen on the way up, including a sort of bamboo, he described the process by which sap resembling honey was obtained from the palms. In the evening they camped at a spring named the Agua del Guanaco, then on the next morning climbed the "rough mass" of fragmented greenstone to the summit, where they spent the day. A plaque on the path to the top commemorates Darwin's ascent. Darwin enjoyed the day thoroughly, writing "Chile & its boundaries the Andes & the Pacifick were seen as in a Map. .... Who can avoid admiring the wonderful force which has upheaved these mountains, & even more so the countless ages which it must have required to have broken through, removed & levelled whole masses of them?" All over the mountain he had seen attempts at gold mining, and even on the summit a small pit had been excavated. After another evening talking round their camp fire, they descended on the following day by a different route to the Hacienda, and continued on to Quillota on their way to Santiago.

== See also ==
- Adiantum gertrudis
- Chicauma
- Cuesta La Dormida
- Kageneckia oblonga
- Ocoa Valley
- Persea lingue
- Puya coquimbensis
- Trevoa trinervis
