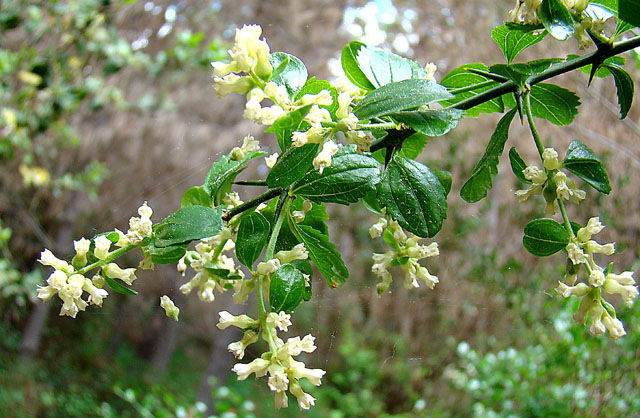

Scientific classification
- Kingdom: Plantae
- Clade: Tracheophytes
- Clade: Angiosperms
- Clade: Eudicots
- Clade: Rosids
- Order: Rosales
- Family: Rhamnaceae
- Genus: Retanilla
- Species: R. trinervia

Binomial name
- Retanilla trinervia (Gillies & Hook.) Hook. & Arn.

Synonyms
- Colletia treba Bertero ex Colla; Trevoa tenuis Miers; Trevoa trinervia Gillies & Hook.; Trevoa trinervis Miers

= Retanilla trinervia =

Species of shrub

Retanilla trinervia is a species of actinorhizal plant within the family Rhamnaceae; this dicotyledon flora is a shrub or small tree. R. trinervia is notable for its ability to fix nitrogen. This species mainly occurs in the near coastal forests and arid shrubland of Chile. Example occurrences are found in the mountains of central Chile; for example, it occurs in the La Campana National Park in association with Acacia caven and Jubaea chilensis. as well as other proximate areas of central Chile.

== See also ==
- Cerro La Campana
