= Cuesta La Dormida =

Mountain in Chile

Coordinates: 33.061°S 71.023°W

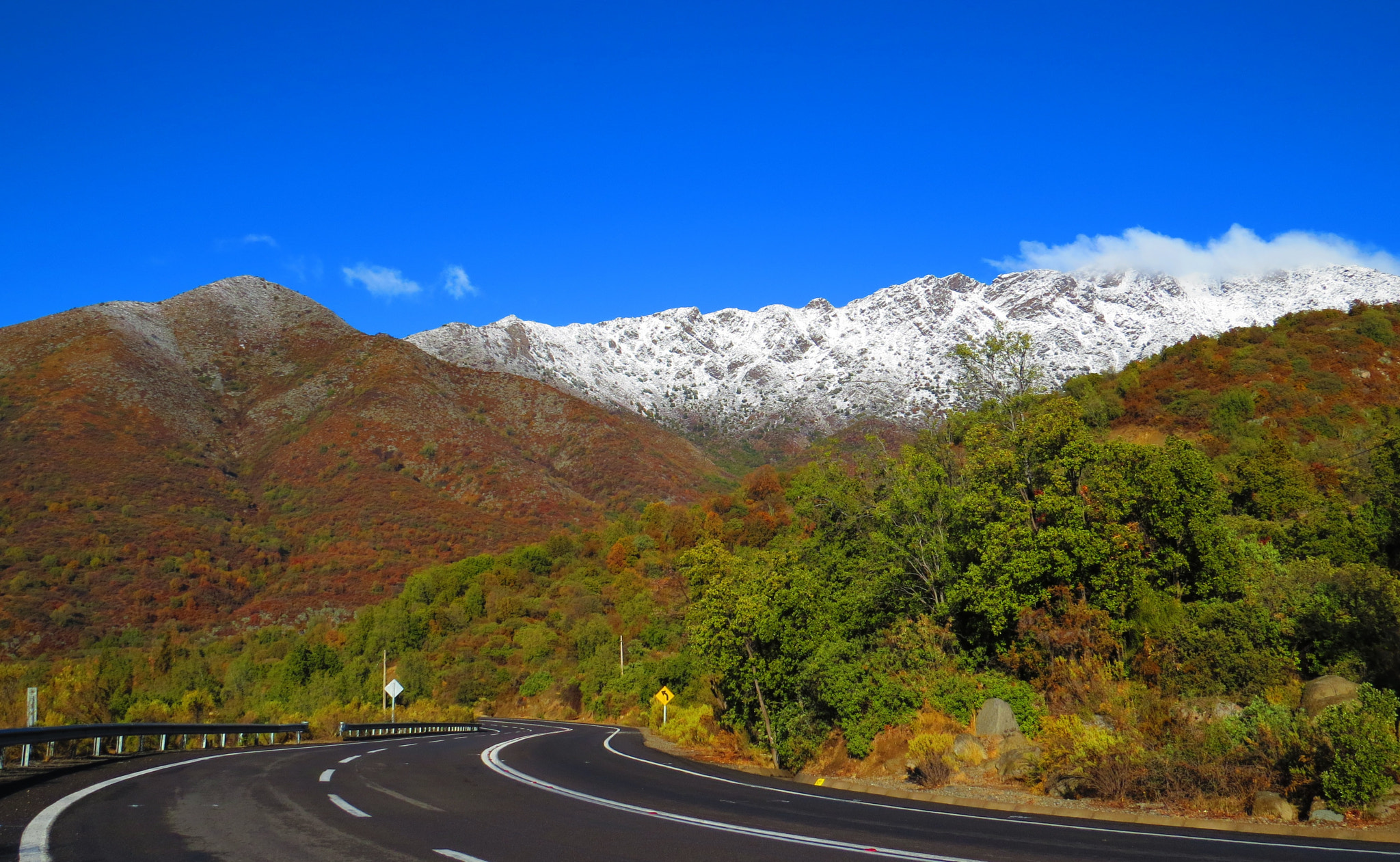
Cuesta La Dormida on a sunny day.

Cuesta La Dormida is a mountain in central Chile. Some of the forested mountain area of Cuesta La Dormida has been added to the La Campana National Park in order to achieve protection for the Jubaea and other endangered species. Forests on Cuesta La Dormida provide habitat for a number of bird and mammal species in addition to the flora mosaic itself.

== See also ==
- Cerro La Campana
- Tiltil
