= Cerro El Roble =

Mountain in Chile

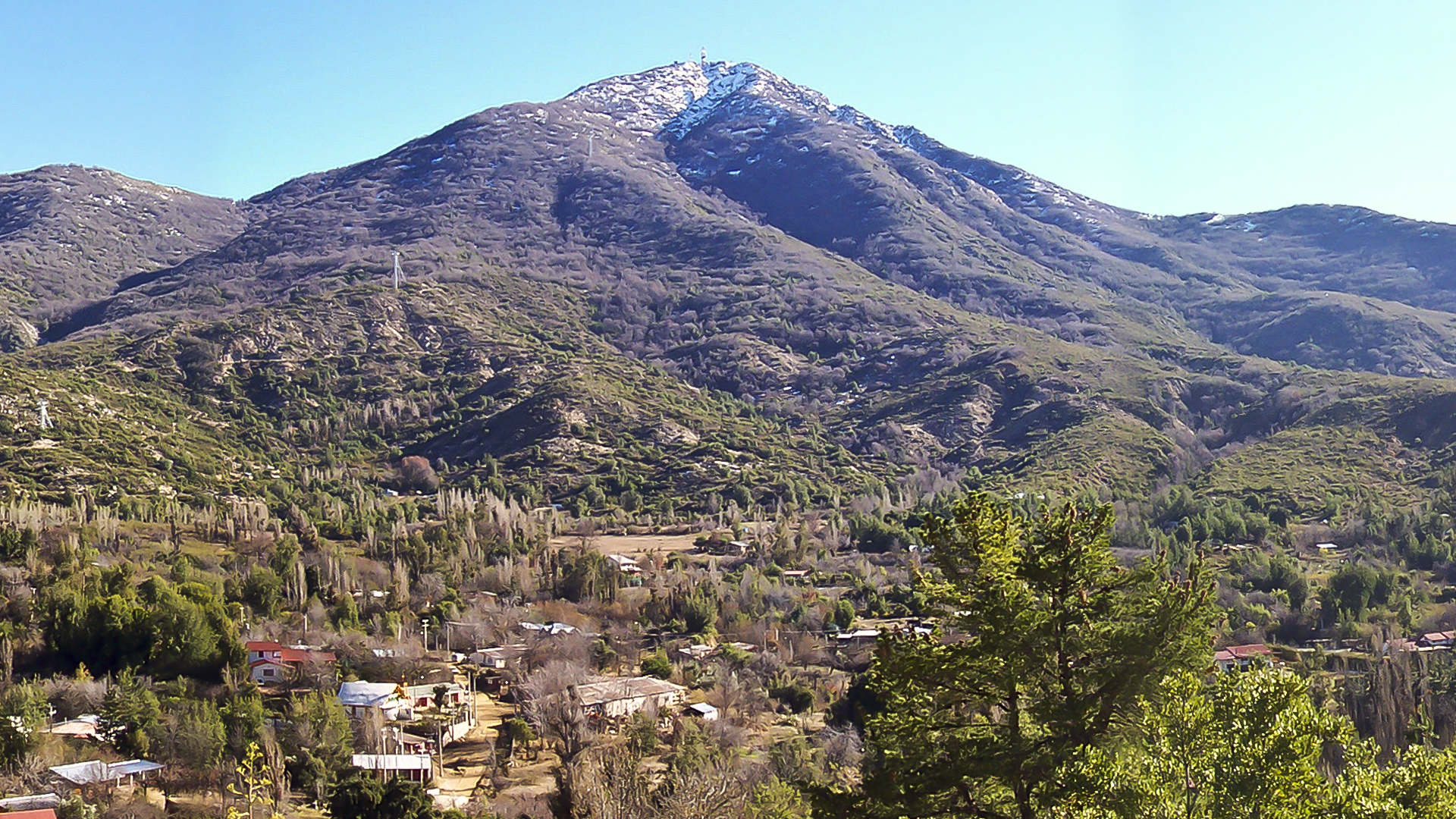

Highest point
- Elevation: 2,222 m (7,290 ft)
- Listing: List of mountains in Chile
- Coordinates: 32°58′32″S 71°00′48″W

Geography
- Location within Chile
- Location: Chile
- Parent range: Chilean Coast Range

Cerro El Roble is a mountain in central Chile. Much of the land area associated with this mountain was incorporated into the La Campana National Park in the late 1990s. A station of the National Astronomical Observatory of Chile, Cerro El Roble Observatory is located at the top of this mountain.

== See also ==
- Asteroid
