= La Campana National Park =

National park in Chile

- IUCN category II (national park)
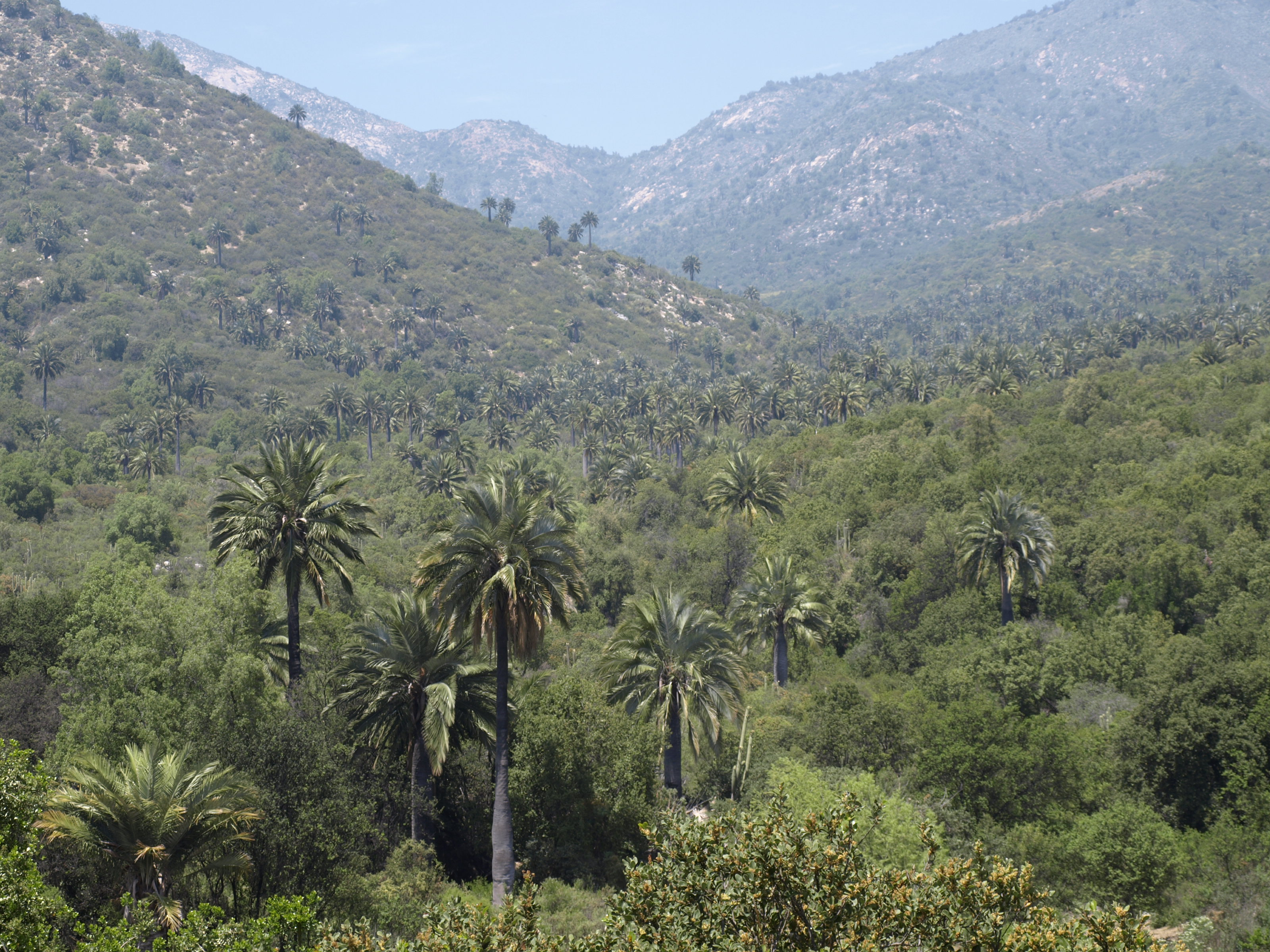

- Location within Chile
- Location: Valparaíso Region, Chile
- Nearest city: Olmué
- Coordinates: 32°58′00″S 71°05′00″W
- Area: 80 km^{2} (31 sq mi)
- Established: 1967
- Visitors: 52,389 (in 2012)
- Governing body: Corporación Nacional Forestal

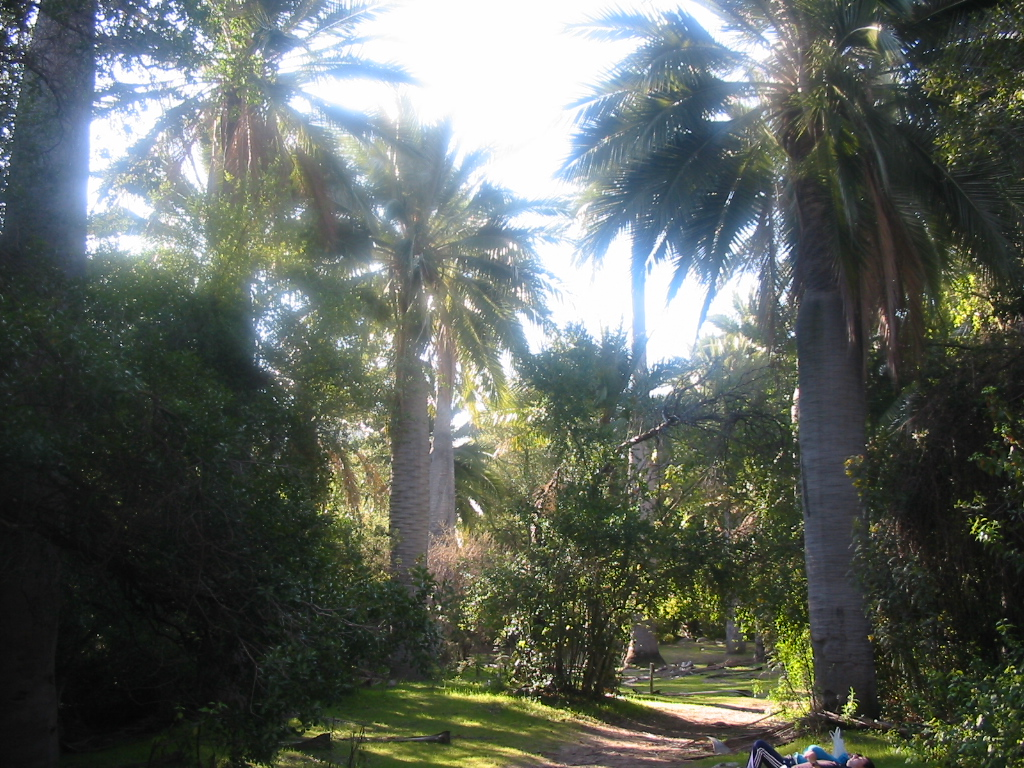
Jubaea chilensis, Ocoa Valley

La Campana National Park is in the Cordillera de la Costa, Quillota Province, in the Valparaíso Region of Chile. La Campana National Park and the Vizcachas Mountains lie northwest of Santiago. This national park covers approximately 80 square kilometres (31 sq mi) and is home to one of the last palm forests of Jubaea chilensis (Chilean Wine Palm), which prehistorically had a much wider distribution than at present. Another attraction is the Cerro La Campana, which lends its name to the park. In 1834 Charles Darwin climbed this mountain, during the second voyage of HMS Beagle.

In 1984, the park, along with Lago Peñuelas National Reserve, was designated by UNESCO as a Biosphere Reserve.

== Biology ==
The park is in the Chilean matorral ecoregion. Chilean wine palm groves occur in the Ocoa Valley. Other typical vegetation species occurring in the park include the Echinopsis chiloensis, Puya chilensis, roble, boldo, litre, peumo, Patagua, winter's bark, and lingue.

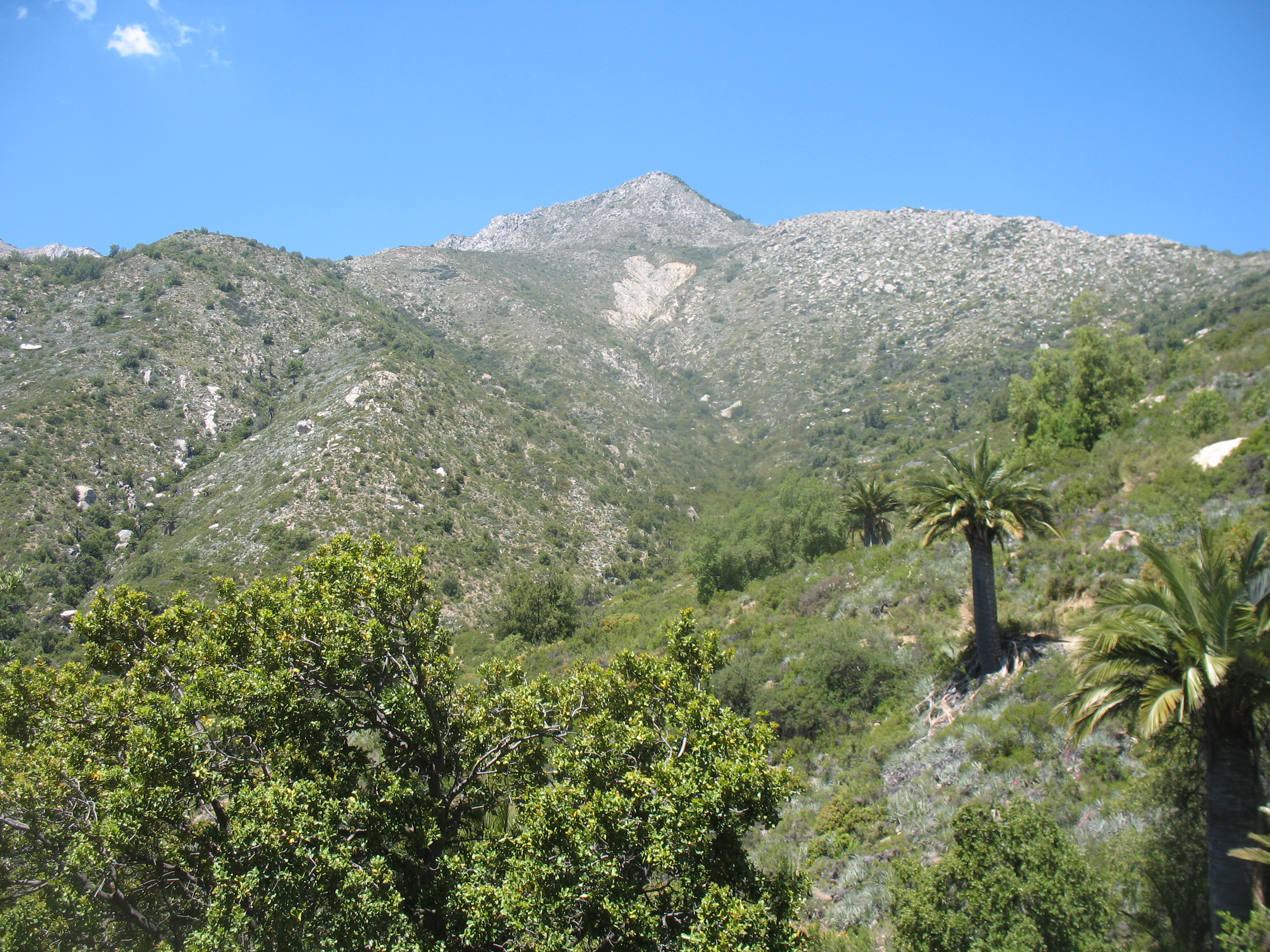

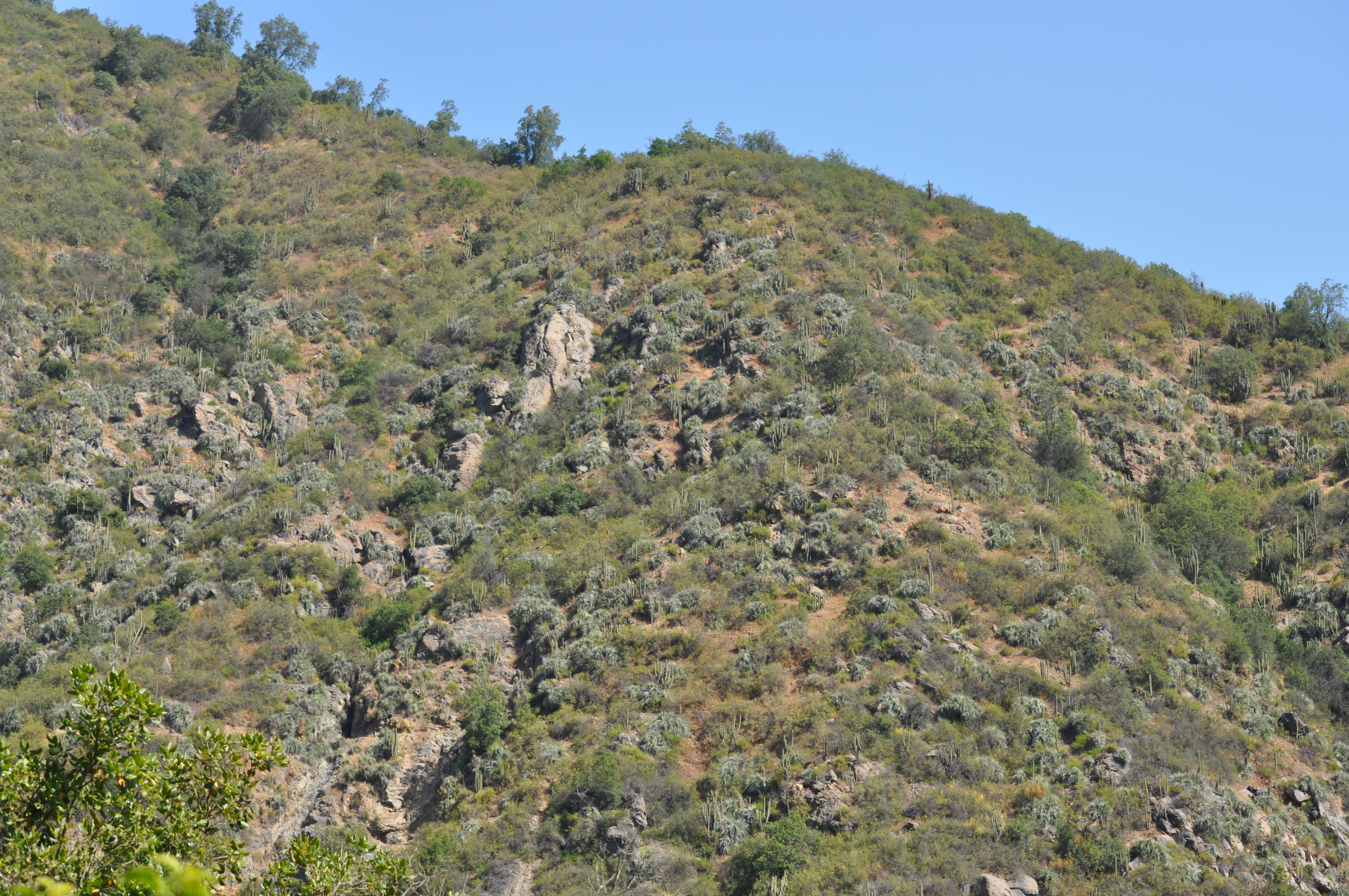
Echinopsis chiloensis & Puya chilensis habitat

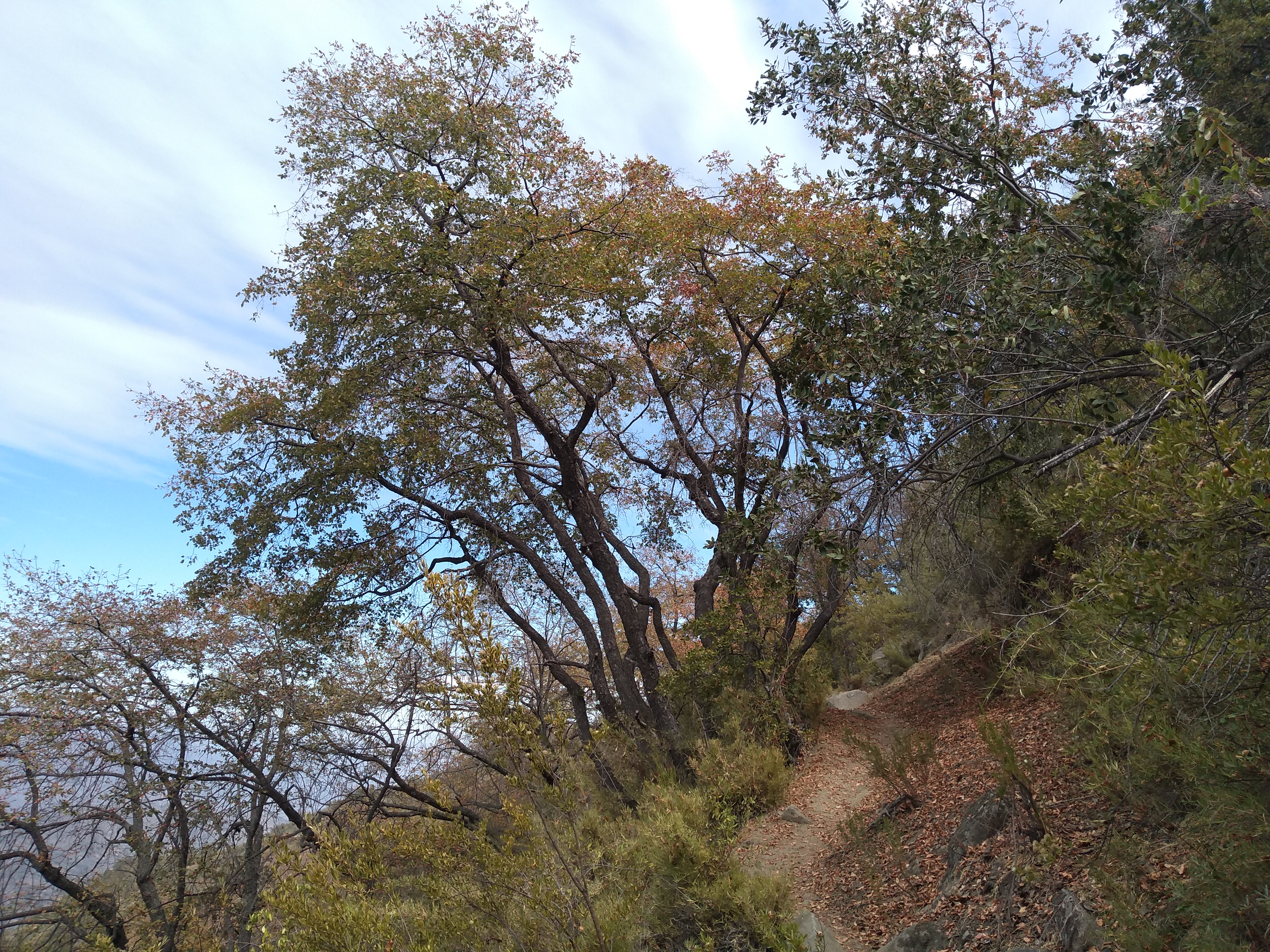

== See also ==
- Avellanita bustillosii
- Chicauma
- Cuesta La Dormida
- La Campana-Peñuelas Biosphere Reserve
- Porlieria chilensis
