= Nitrogen fixation =

Conversion of dinitrogen into ammonia

Nitrogen fixation is a chemical process by which the abundant but relatively inert molecular dinitrogen (N_{2}) is converted into bioavailable nitrogen compounds such as ammonia (NH_{3}) and nitrates (NO^{−}_{3}). It occurs both biologically and abiologically, the latter either naturally through weather phenomena (e.g. lightning) or artificially by chemical industries. Biological nitrogen fixation or diazotrophy is catalyzed by enzymes called nitrogenases, produced by microorganisms such as cyanobacteria and rhizobia. These enzyme complexes are encoded by the Nif genes (or Nif homologs) and contain iron, often with a second metal (usually molybdenum, but sometimes vanadium).

Some nitrogen-fixing bacteria have symbiotic relationships with plants, especially legumes, mosses, and aquatic ferns such as Azolla. Looser non-symbiotic relationships between diazotrophs and plants are often referred to as associative, as seen in nitrogen fixation on rice roots. Nitrogen fixation occurs between some termites and fungi. It occurs naturally in the air by means of NO_{x} production by lightning.

Nitrogen fixation is a key component of the nitrogen cycle and is essential to life on Earth, as all vital organic compounds such as DNA and proteins contain nitrogen. Industrial nitrogen fixation, most notably through the Haber process, underpins the manufacture of all nitrogenous industrial products, which include fertilizers, pharmaceuticals, textiles, dyes and explosives.

== History ==
Schematic representation of the nitrogen cycle. Abiotic nitrogen fixation has been omitted.

Biological nitrogen fixation was discovered by Jean-Baptiste Boussingault in 1838. Later, in 1880, the process by which it happens was discovered by the German agronomist Hermann Hellriegel and Hermann Wilfarth and was fully described by Dutch microbiologist Martinus Beijerinck.

"The protracted investigations of the relation of plants to the acquisition of nitrogen begun by de Saussure, Ville, Lawes, Gilbert and others, and culminated in the discovery of symbiotic fixation by Hellriegel and Wilfarth in 1887."

"Experiments by Bossingault in 1855 and Pugh, Gilbert & Lawes in 1887 had shown that nitrogen did not enter the plant directly. The discovery of the role of nitrogen-fixing bacteria by Herman Hellriegel and Herman Wilfarth in 1886–1888 would open a new era of soil science."

In 1901, Beijerinck showed that Azotobacter chroococcum was able to fix atmospheric nitrogen. This was the first known species of the Azotobacter genus, so-named by him. It is also the first known diazotroph, species that use diatomic nitrogen as a step in the complete nitrogen cycle.

== Biological ==
Biological nitrogen fixation (BNF) occurs when atmospheric nitrogen is converted to ammonia by a nitrogenase enzyme. The overall reaction for BNF is:

N_{2} + 16ATP + 16H_{2}O + 8e^{−} + 8H^{+} → 2NH_{3} + H_{2} + 16ADP + 16P_{i}

The process is coupled to the hydrolysis of 16 equivalents of ATP and is accompanied by the co-formation of one equivalent of H_{2}. The conversion of N_{2} into ammonia occurs at a metal cluster called FeMoco, an abbreviation for the iron-molybdenum cofactor. The mechanism proceeds via a series of protonation and reduction steps wherein the FeMoco active site hydrogenates the N_{2} substrate. In free-living diazotrophs, nitrogenase-generated ammonia is assimilated into glutamate through the glutamine synthetase/glutamate synthase pathway. The microbial nif genes required for nitrogen fixation are widely distributed in diverse environments.

Nitrogenases are rapidly degraded by oxygen. For this reason, many bacteria cease production of the enzyme in the presence of oxygen. Many nitrogen-fixing organisms exist only in anaerobic conditions, respiring to draw down oxygen levels, or binding the oxygen with a protein such as leghemoglobin.

=== Importance of nitrogen ===
Atmospheric nitrogen cannot be metabolized by most organisms, because its triple covalent bond is very strong. Most take up fixed nitrogen from various sources. For every 100 atoms of carbon, roughly 2 to 20 atoms of nitrogen are assimilated. The atomic ratio of carbon (C) : nitrogen (N) : phosphorus (P) observed on average in planktonic biomass was originally described by Alfred Redfield, who determined the stoichiometric relationship between C:N:P atoms, The Redfield Ratio, to be 106:16:1.

=== Nitrogenase ===
The protein complex nitrogenase is responsible for catalyzing the reduction of nitrogen gas (N_{2}) to ammonia (NH_{3}). In cyanobacteria, this enzyme system is housed in a specialized cell called the heterocyst. The production of the nitrogenase complex is genetically regulated, and the activity of the protein complex is dependent on ambient oxygen concentrations, and intra- and extracellular concentrations of ammonia and oxidized nitrogen species (nitrate and nitrite). Additionally, the combined concentrations of both ammonium and nitrate are thought to inhibit N_{Fix}, specifically when intracellular concentrations of 2-oxoglutarate (2-OG) exceed a critical threshold. The specialized heterocyst cell is necessary for the performance of nitrogenase as a result of its sensitivity to ambient oxygen.

Nitrogenase consist of two proteins, a catalytic iron-dependent protein, commonly referred to as MoFe protein and a reducing iron-only protein (Fe protein). Three iron-dependent proteins are known: molybdenum-dependent, vanadium-dependent, and iron-only, with all three nitrogenase protein variations containing an iron protein component. Molybdenum-dependent nitrogenase is most common. The different types of nitrogenase can be determined by the specific iron protein component. Nitrogenase is highly conserved. Gene expression through DNA sequencing can distinguish which protein complex is present in the microorganism and potentially being expressed. Most frequently, the nifH gene is used to identify the presence of molybdenum-dependent nitrogenase, followed by closely related nitrogenase reductases (component II) vnfH and anfH representing vanadium-dependent and iron-only nitrogenase, respectively. In studying the ecology and evolution of nitrogen-fixing bacteria, the nifH gene is the biomarker most widely used. nifH has two similar genes anfH and vnfH that also encode for the nitrogenase reductase component of the nitrogenase complex.

=== Evolution of nitrogenase ===
Nitrogenase is thought to have evolved sometime between 1.5-2.2 billion years ago (Ga), although there is some isotopic support for nitrogenase evolution as early as around 3.2 Ga. Nitrogenase appears to have evolved from maturase-like proteins, although the function of the preceding protein is currently unknown.

Nitrogenase has three different forms (Nif, Anf, and Vnf) that correspond with the metal found in the active site of the protein (molybdenum, iron, and vanadium respectively). Marine metal abundances over Earth's geologic timeline are thought to have driven the relative abundance of which form of nitrogenase was most common. Currently, there is no conclusive agreement on which form of nitrogenase arose first.

=== Microorganisms ===
Diazotrophs are widespread within domain Bacteria including cyanobacteria (e.g. the highly significant Trichodesmium and Cyanothece), green sulfur bacteria, purple sulfur bacteria, Azotobacteraceae, rhizobia and Frankia. Several obligately anaerobic bacteria fix nitrogen including many (but not all) Clostridium spp. Some archaea such as Methanosarcina acetivorans also fix nitrogen, and several other methanogenic taxa, are significant contributors to nitrogen fixation in oxygen-deficient soils.

Cyanobacteria, commonly known as blue-green algae, inhabit nearly all illuminated environments on Earth and play key roles in the carbon and nitrogen cycle of the biosphere. In general, cyanobacteria can use various inorganic and organic sources of combined nitrogen, such as nitrate, nitrite, ammonium, urea, or some amino acids. Several cyanobacteria strains are also capable of diazotrophic growth, an ability that may have been present in their last common ancestor in the Archean eon. Nitrogen fixation not only naturally occurs in soils but also aquatic systems, including both freshwater and marine. Indeed, the amount of nitrogen fixed in the ocean is at least as much as that on land. The colonial marine cyanobacterium Trichodesmium is thought to fix nitrogen on such a scale that it accounts for almost half of the nitrogen fixation in marine systems globally. Marine surface lichens and non-photosynthetic bacteria belonging in Proteobacteria and Planctomycetes fixate significant atmospheric nitrogen. Species of nitrogen-fixing cyanobacteria in fresh waters include: Aphanizomenon and Dolichospermum (previously Anabaena). Such species have specialized cells called heterocytes, in which nitrogen fixation occurs via the nitrogenase enzyme.

=== Algae ===
One type of organelle, originating from cyanobacterial endosymbionts called UCYN-A2, can turn nitrogen gas into a biologically available form. This nitroplast was discovered in algae, particularly in the marine algae Braarudosphaera bigelowii.

Diatoms in the family Rhopalodiaceae also possess cyanobacterial endosymbionts called spheroid bodies or diazoplasts. These endosymbionts have lost photosynthetic properties, but have kept the ability to perform nitrogen fixation, allowing these diatoms to fix atmospheric nitrogen. Other diatoms in symbiosis with nitrogen-fixing cyanobacteria are among the genera Hemiaulus, Rhizosolenia and Chaetoceros.

=== Root nodule symbioses ===
==== Legume family ====
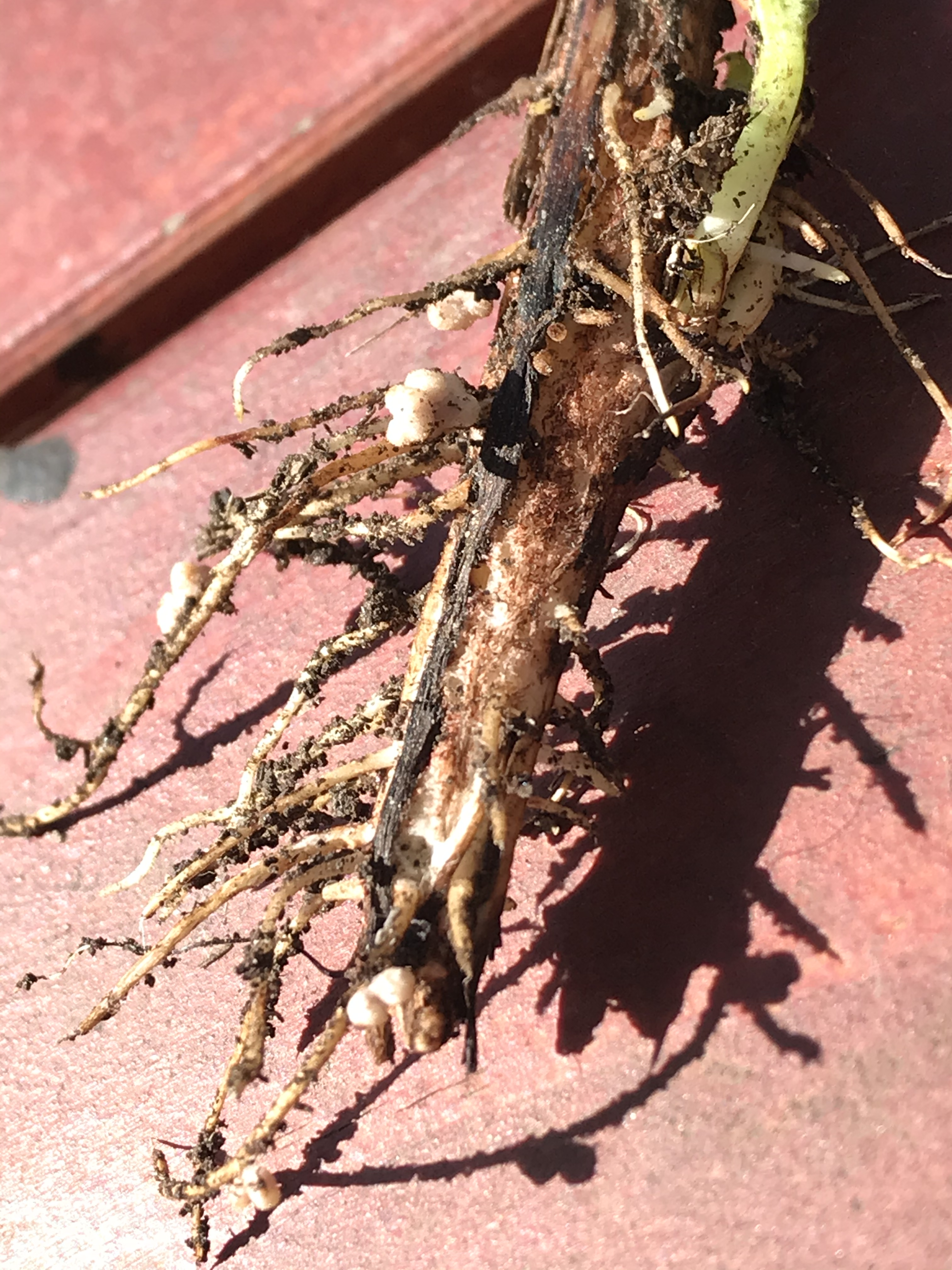
Nodules are visible on this broad bean root

Plants that contribute to nitrogen fixation include those of the legume family—Fabaceae— with taxa such as kudzu, clover, soybean, alfalfa, lupin, peanut and rooibos. They contain symbiotic rhizobia bacteria within nodules in their root systems, producing nitrogen compounds that help the plant to grow and compete with other plants. When the plant dies, the fixed nitrogen is released, making it available to other plants; this helps to fertilize the soil. The great majority of legumes have this association, but a few genera (e.g., Styphnolobium) do not. In many traditional farming practices, fields are rotated through various types of crops, which usually include one consisting mainly or entirely of clover.

Fixation efficiency in soil is dependent on many factors, including the legume and air and soil conditions. For example, nitrogen fixation by red clover can range from 50 to 200 lb/acre (56 to 224 kg/ha).

==== Non-leguminous ====
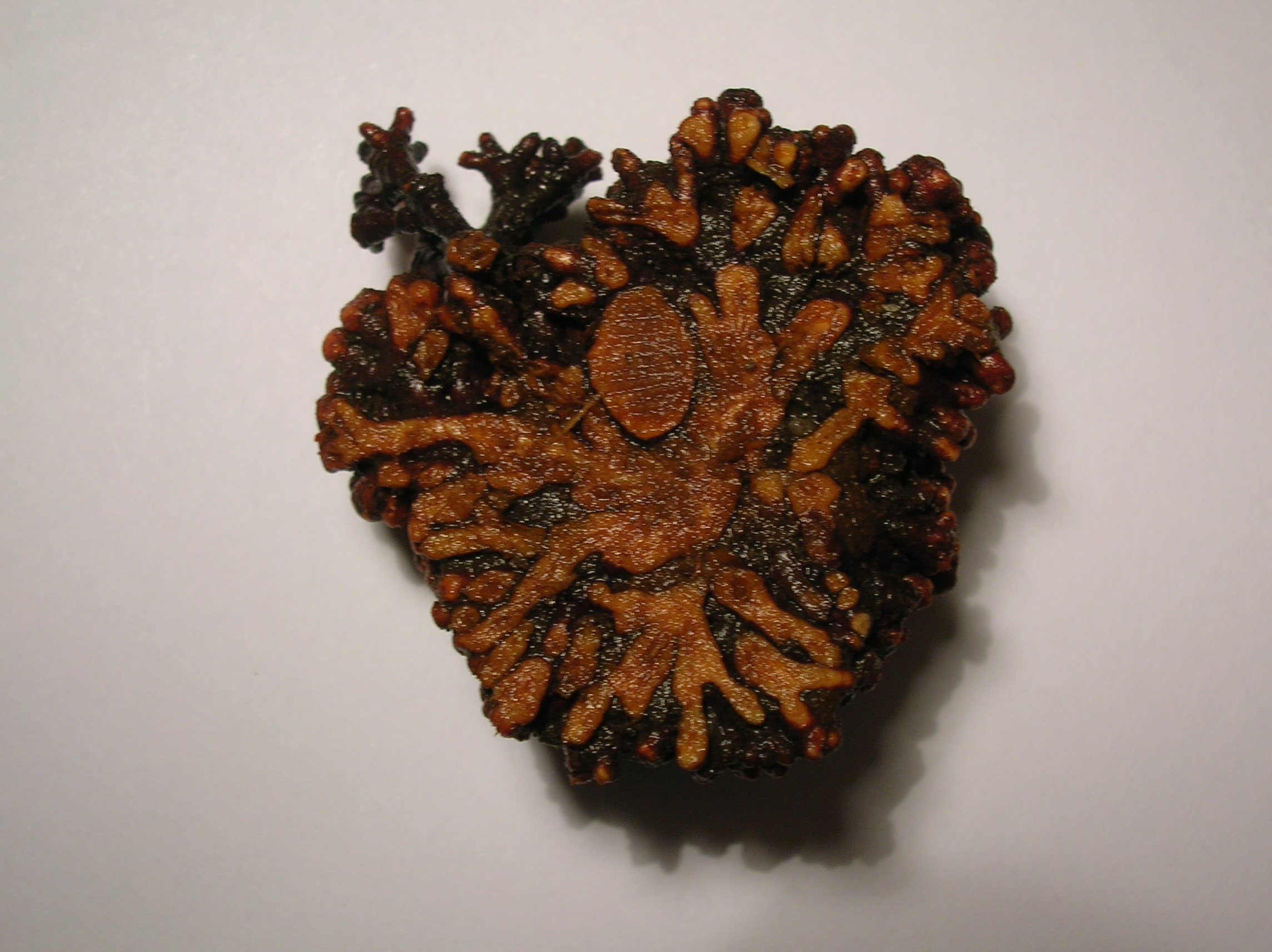
A sectioned alder tree root nodule

The ability to fix nitrogen in nodules is present in actinorhizal plants such as alder and bayberry, with the help of Frankia bacteria. They are found in 25 genera in the orders Cucurbitales, Fagales and Rosales, which together with the Fabales form a nitrogen-fixing clade of eurosids. The ability to fix nitrogen is not universally present in these families. For example, of 122 Rosaceae genera, only four fix nitrogen. Fabales were the first lineage to branch off this nitrogen-fixing clade; thus, the ability to fix nitrogen may be plesiomorphic and subsequently lost in most descendants of the original nitrogen-fixing plant; however, it may be that the basic genetic and physiological requirements were present in an incipient state in the most recent common ancestors of all these plants, but only evolved to full function in some of them.

In addition, Trema (Parasponia), a tropical genus in the family Cannabaceae, is unusually able to interact with rhizobia and form nitrogen-fixing nodules.

Non-legumious nodulating plants
Family	Genera	Number of species	Known nodulated
Betulaceae	Alnus (alders)	47	47
Cannabaceae	Trema (Parasponia)		Trema orientale; Trema lamarckiana
Casuarinaceae	Allocasuarina	59	54
Casuarinaceae	Casuarina	18	18
Casuarinaceae	Ceuthostoma	2	2
Casuarinaceae	Gymnostoma	18	18
Coriariaceae	Coriaria	16	16
Datiscaceae	Datisca	2	2
Elaeagnaceae	Elaeagnus (silverberries)	45	35
Elaeagnaceae	Hippophae (sea-buckthorns)	3	2
Elaeagnaceae	Shepherdia (buffaloberries)	3	2
Myricaceae	Comptonia (sweetfern)	1	1
Myricaceae	Myrica (bayberries)	60	28
Posidoniaceae	Posidonia (seagrass)		Posidonia oceanica
Rhamnaceae	Adolphia	1	1
Rhamnaceae	Ceanothus	55	31
Rhamnaceae	Colletia	17	4
Rhamnaceae	Discaria	10	5
Rhamnaceae	Retanilla		
Rosaceae	Cercocarpus	20	4
Rosaceae	Chamaebatia	2	1
Rosaceae	Cowania	25	1
Rosaceae	Dryas	3	1
Rosaceae	Purshia	4	2
Rosaceae	Kentrothamnus	2	2
Rosaceae	Talguenea	1	1
Rosaceae	Trevoa	6	2

=== Other plant symbionts ===
Some other plants live in association with a cyanobiont (cyanobacteria such as Nostoc) which fix nitrogen for them:

- Some lichens such as Lobaria and Peltigera
- Mosquito fern (Azolla species)
- Cycads
- Gunnera
- Blasia (liverwort)
- Hornworts

Some symbiotic relationships involving agriculturally-important plants are:

- Sugarcane and unclear endophytes
- Foxtail millet and Azospirillum brasilense
- Kallar grass and Azoarcus sp. strain BH72
- Rice and Herbaspirillum seropedicae
- Wheat and Klebsiella pneumoniae
- Maize landrace 'Sierra Mixe' / 'olotón' and various Bacteroidota and Pseudomonadota

== Industrial processes ==
=== Historical ===
A method for nitrogen fixation was first described by Henry Cavendish in 1784 using electric arcs reacting nitrogen and oxygen in air. This method was implemented in the Birkeland–Eyde process of 1903. The fixation of nitrogen by lightning is a very similar natural occurring process.

The possibility that atmospheric nitrogen reacts with certain chemicals was first observed by M. Desfosses, a pharmacist from Besançon, in 1828. He observed that mixtures of alkali metal oxides and carbon react with nitrogen at high temperatures. With the use of barium carbonate as starting material, the first commercial process became available in the 1860s, developed by Margueritte and Sourdeval. The resulting barium cyanide reacts with steam, yielding ammonia. In 1898 Frank and Caro developed what is known as the Frank–Caro process to fix nitrogen in the form of calcium cyanamide. The process was eclipsed by the Haber process, which was discovered in 1909.

=== Haber process ===
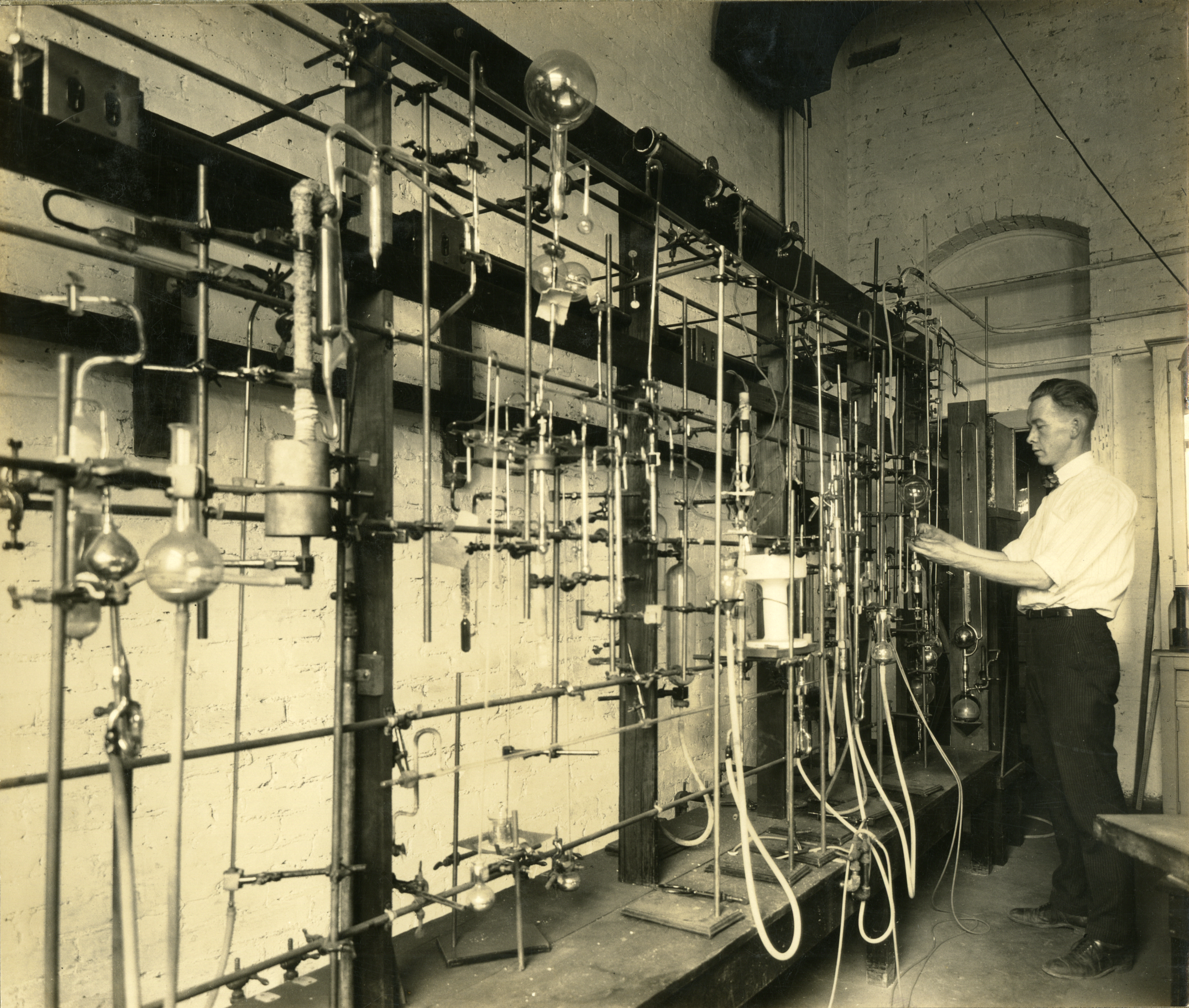
Equipment for a study of nitrogen fixation by alpha rays (Fixed Nitrogen Research Laboratory, 1926)

The dominant industrial method for producing ammonia is the Haber process, also known as the Haber-Bosch process. It was developed by German chemists Fritz Haber and Carl Bosch and first demonstrated in 1909. Fertilizer production is now the largest source of human-produced fixed nitrogen in the terrestrial ecosystem. Ammonia is a required precursor to fertilizers, explosives, and other products. The Haber process requires high pressures (around 200 atm) and high temperatures (at least 400 °C), which are routine conditions for industrial catalysis. This process uses natural gas as a hydrogen source and air as a nitrogen source. The ammonia product has resulted in an intensification of nitrogen fertilizer globally and is credited with supporting the expansion of the human population from around 2 billion in the early 20th century to more than 8 billion people now.

=== Homogeneous catalysis ===
Much research has been conducted on the discovery of catalysts for nitrogen fixation, often with the goal of lowering energy requirements. However, such research has thus far failed to approach the efficiency and ease of the Haber process. Many compounds react with atmospheric nitrogen to give dinitrogen complexes. The first dinitrogen complex to be reported was Ru(NH_{3})_{5}(N_{2})^{2+}. Some soluble complexes do catalyze nitrogen fixation.

== Lightning ==
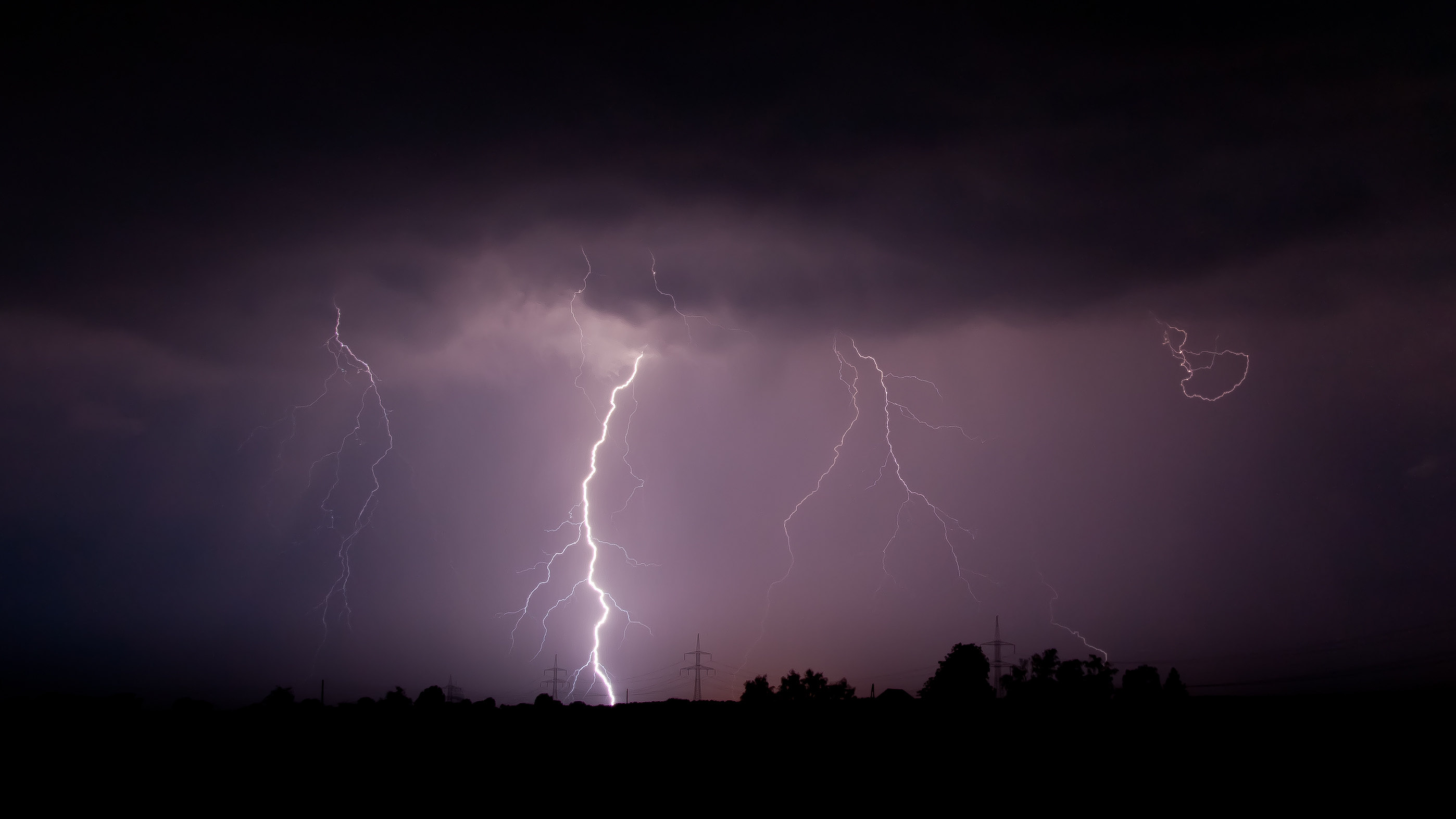
Lightning heats the air around it in a high-temperature plasma, breaking the bonds of N_{2}, starting the formation of nitrous acid (HNO_{2}).

Nitrogen can be fixed by lightning converting nitrogen gas (N_{2}) and oxygen gas (O_{2}) in the atmosphere into nitrogen oxides (NO_{x}). The N_{2} molecule is highly stable and nonreactive due to the triple bond between the nitrogen atoms. Lightning produces enough energy and heat to break this bond allowing nitrogen atoms to react with oxygen, forming NO_{x}. These compounds cannot be used by plants, but as this molecule cools, it reacts with oxygen to form nitrogen dioxide (NO_{2}), which in turn reacts with water to produce nitrous acid (HNO_{2}) or nitric acid (HNO_{3}). When these acids seep into the soil, they produce nitrate (NO_{3}^{−}), which is of use to plants.

== See also ==
- Birkeland–Eyde process: an industrial fertilizer production process
- Carbon fixation
- Denitrification: an organic process of nitrogen release
- George Washington Carver: an American botanist
- Heterocyst
- Marine nitrogen fixation
- Nitrification: biological production of nitrogen
- Nitrogen cycle: the flow and transformation of nitrogen through the environment
- Nitrogen deficiency
- Nitrogen fixation package for quantitative measurement of nitrogen fixation by plants
- Nitrogenase: enzymes used by organisms to fix nitrogen
- Ostwald process: a chemical process for making nitric acid (HNO_{3})
- Electrification of catalytic processes: electrochemical reduction of N_{2}
