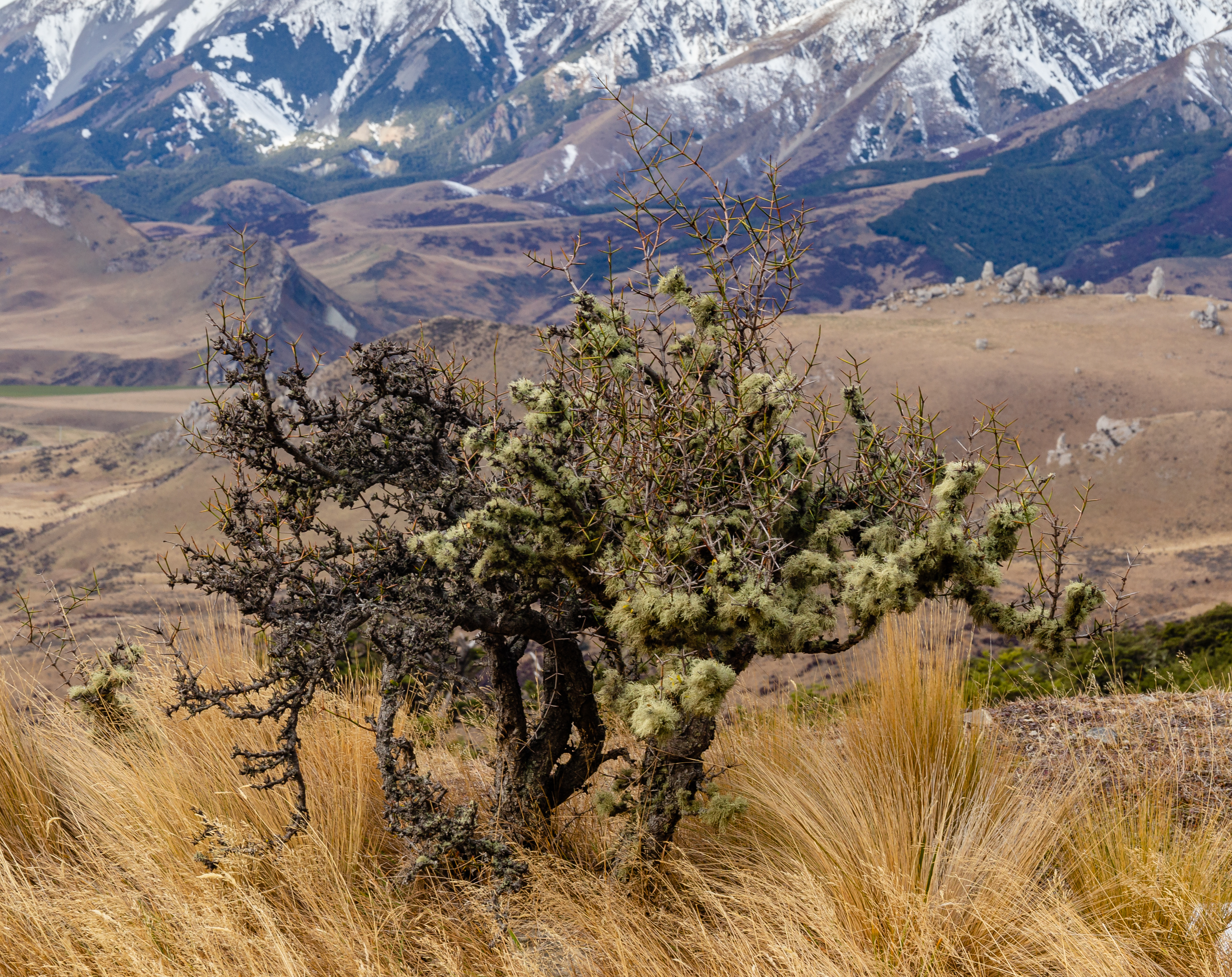
- A matagouri on Leith Hill, Canterbury

Conservation status
- Declining (NZ TCS)

Scientific classification
- Kingdom: Plantae
- Clade: Tracheophytes
- Clade: Angiosperms
- Clade: Eudicots
- Clade: Rosids
- Order: Rosales
- Family: Rhamnaceae
- Genus: Discaria
- Species: D. toumatou

Binomial name
- Discaria toumatou Raoul

Synonyms
- Discaria australis var. apetala Hook.f.; Notophaena toumatou Miers

= Discaria toumatou =

Species of shrub endemic to New Zealand

Discaria toumatou, commonly called matagouri, tūmatakuru, or wild Irishman, is a tangle-branched thorny shrub endemic to New Zealand. It is common throughout the South Island and is less common in the North Island.

== Taxonomy ==
This species was described by French naturalist Étienne Raoul in 1844 from material collected in Akaroa in association with Pteridium esculentum. The generic name Discaria refers to disc-shaped flowers. The Latinised specific epithet Raoul chose, toumatou, is a corruption of the word tūmatakuru, one of the Māori names for this species, which he transcribed as "toumatou-kourou".

=== Etymology ===
The English name matagouri is another corruption of tūmatakuru. Other names in the Māori language include tūmatakuri and tūturi. Another name is "wild Irishman"; the English writer Samuel Butler in 1863 recalled "…a very uncomfortable prickly shrub, which they call Irishman, and which I do not like the look of at all."

== Description ==
Matagouri is a tangle-branched, extremely spiny, divaricating shrub; sometimes it can grow to be a small tree up to five metres tall with rough grey bark. It is deciduous and has very small leathery leaves mostly in spring and early summer. The glossy green leaves arise at the bases of the spines, which can be several centimetres long. The spines are green when young, later turning grey. Matagouri is the only New Zealand native plant that has spines of this kind.

The flowers are tiny, scented, and white with no petals, only 4–5 triangular petal-like sepals. They appear in October–December, followed in January–March by small three-lobed green to brown fruits.

== Distribution ==
Matagouri is common in the eastern South Island and in Chatham Island, and is found in a few coastal localities in the North Island south from the mouth of the Waikato River. It commonly forms thickets in lowland to montane tussock grassland, stony areas, sand dunes, and river beds, and occasionally in subalpine scrubland.

== Ecology ==
As with other Discaria species, matagouri fixes nitrogen from the atmosphere with the help of symbiotic bacteria of the genus Frankia in its roots, and so can grow in nutrient-poor habitats. It often grows in association with mingimingi (Coprosma propinqua), porcupine shrub (Melicytus alpinus, an alpine mahoe), native brooms (Carmichaelia species) and the introduced weed sweet briar (Rosa rubiginosa). Matagouri grows slowly, and plants in undisturbed areas can be over 100 years old.

== Threats ==
Matagouri is often cleared, burned, or poisoned by farmers to create pasture, but as a native plant it has complete protection on public conservation land and a degree of protection on private land under the Resource Management Act 1991. In a notable case a 400 ha area of matagouri, including trees that may have been 150 years old, was illegally sprayed at the head of Lake Sumner in 2001. It also faces competition from the invasive introduced species gorse and broom, and is attacked in Spring by possums, which can ring-bark entire trees. Although it can resprout after fire, sheep and rabbits combined with regular tussock burning has significantly reduced the once-extensive forests of matagouri that once stood 6 metres (20 feet) high.

The regeneration of this plant is hindered as a result of the need for both male and female plants to be grown near each other to reproduce.

== Conservation efforts ==
This species is regarded as being in serious decline in the Wellington Region. In 2021, a population of this species was discovered on the Miramar Peninsula as a result of Predator Free Wellington's pest eradication efforts. Seeds were gathered by the Wellington City Council and propagated helping to increase plant numbers in the region. In 2023, two individual plants near Wellington Airport had to be removed due to construction by the Wellington City Council. Prior to their removal the Council collected cuttings and seeds to assist with the efforts of regenerating this species and to help increase the genetic diversity of the surviving relic populations.

== Cultural uses ==
Matagouri spines were used by Māori for tattooing when no better tool was available. In 1997 matagouri, along with other Wellington coastal species, was planted in traffic islands in Petone Esplanade in Lower Hutt.

== Works cited ==
Websites

- De Lange, Peter (2024). "Discaria toumatou". New Zealand Plant Conservation Network. Archived from the original on 8 August 2020.
- "Discaria toumatou – Coprosma propinqua –Anthoxanthum odoratum – Dactylis glomerata shrubland". Manaaki Whenua – Landcare Research. Archived from the original on 17 February 2021.

Books

- Cheeseman, T. F. (2009) [1906]. Manual of the New Zealand flora (Digitised first ed.). Wellington, New Zealand: New Zealand Board of Science and Art. ISBN 9781514880548 – via the Internet Archive.
- Metcalf, L. J. (2002). A Photographic Guide to trees of New Zealand. Auckland, New Zealand: New Holland Publishers. ISBN 1-877246-57-3 – via the Internet Archive.
