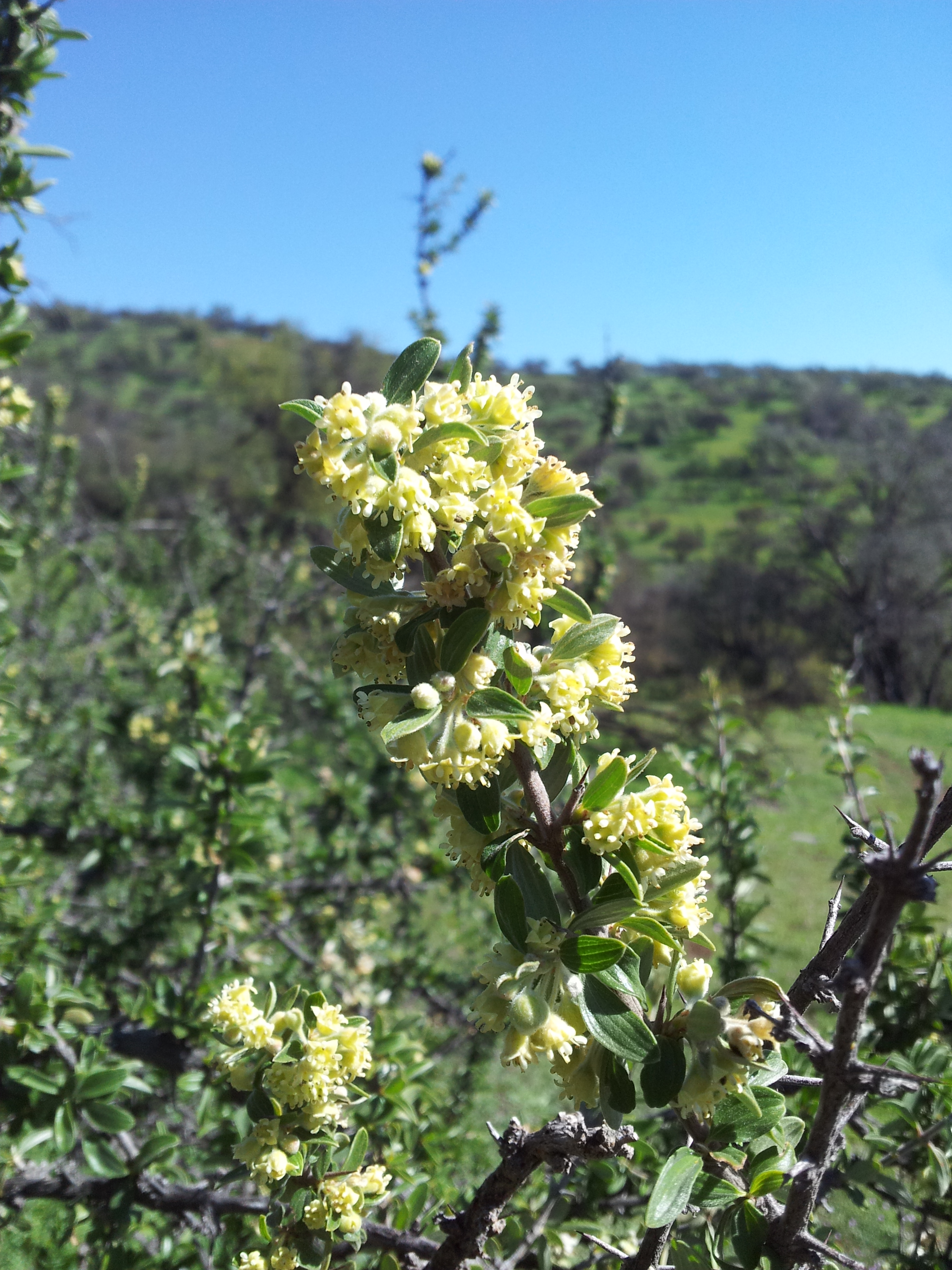
- Trevoa quinquenervia

Scientific classification
- Kingdom: Plantae
- Clade: Tracheophytes
- Clade: Angiosperms
- Clade: Eudicots
- Clade: Rosids
- Order: Rosales
- Family: Rhamnaceae
- Tribe: Colletieae
- Genus: Trevoa; Miers ex Hook.

Synonyms
- Talguenea Miers ex Endl.

= Trevoa =

Family of shrubs and trees

Trevoa is a genus of actinorhizal plants; these dicotyledon flora are trees or small shrubs. The genus was first proposed by Miers in 1825, but was not fully described until 1830 by Sir William Jackson Hooker. Genus members are notable for their ability to fix nitrogen. Species of this genus are generally found in the near coastal forests and arid shrubland of South America. Some species are localized in the mountains of central Chile; for example, the species Trevoa trinervis occurs in the La Campana National Park and other proximate areas of central Chile.

Along with some related plants in the family Rhamnaceae, they fix nitrogen via root nodules which contain Frankia bacteria. Other nitrogen-fixing genera in this family include Ceanothus, Colletia, Discaria, Kentrothamnus, and Retanilla.

== Taxonomy ==
The botanist Karl Friedrich Reiche, publishing in the years 1894–1911, recognized 6 species. Currently there are five recognized species in the genus.

=== Species ===
Trevoa comprises the following species:

- Trevoa campanulata Reiche
- Trevoa closiana Miers
- Trevoa glauca Reiche
- Trevoa quinquenervia Gillies & Hook. (syn. Talguenea quinquenervia)
- Trevoa spinifer Escal.

=== Species names with uncertain taxonomic status ===
The status of the following species and hybrids is unresolved:

- Trevoa berteroniana Steud.
- Trevoa tenuis Miers

=== Formerly placed here ===
- Trevoa trinervis Miers = Retanilla trinervia (Gillies & Hook.) Hook. & Arn.
