= Actinorhizal plant =

Plants hosting N-fixing Frankia symbionts in nodules

Actinorhizal plants are a group of angiosperms characterized by their ability to form a symbiosis with the nitrogen-fixing actinomycetota Frankia. This association leads to the formation of nitrogen-fixing root nodules.

Actinorhizal plants are distributed within nine lineages, and are characterized by nitrogen fixation. They are distributed globally, and are pioneer species in nitrogen-poor environments. Their symbiotic relationships with Frankia evolved independently over time, and the symbiosis occurs in the root nodule infection site.

== Classification ==
Actinorhizal plants are dicotyledons distributed within three orders, eight families and twenty-six genera, of the angiosperm clade.

	Classification	Order	Family	Genera
The Clade Angiosperms	Actinorhizal Plants	Cucurbitales	Coriariaceae	Coriaria
The Clade Angiosperms	Actinorhizal Plants	Cucurbitales	Datiscaceae	Datisca
The Clade Angiosperms	Actinorhizal Plants	Fagales	Betulaceae	Alnus
The Clade Angiosperms	Actinorhizal Plants	Fagales	Casuarinaceae	Allocasuarina
The Clade Angiosperms	Actinorhizal Plants	Fagales	Casuarinaceae	Casuarina
The Clade Angiosperms	Actinorhizal Plants	Fagales	Casuarinaceae	Ceuthostoma
The Clade Angiosperms	Actinorhizal Plants	Fagales	Casuarinaceae	Gymnostoma
The Clade Angiosperms	Actinorhizal Plants	Fagales	Myricaceae	Comptonia
The Clade Angiosperms	Actinorhizal Plants	Fagales	Myricaceae	Myrica
The Clade Angiosperms	Actinorhizal Plants	Rosales	Elaeagnaceae	Elaeagnus
The Clade Angiosperms	Actinorhizal Plants	Rosales	Elaeagnaceae	Hippophae
The Clade Angiosperms	Actinorhizal Plants	Rosales	Elaeagnaceae	Shepherdia
The Clade Angiosperms	Actinorhizal Plants	Rosales	Rhamnaceae	Adolphia
The Clade Angiosperms	Actinorhizal Plants	Rosales	Rhamnaceae	Colletia
The Clade Angiosperms	Actinorhizal Plants	Rosales	Rhamnaceae	Discaria
The Clade Angiosperms	Actinorhizal Plants	Rosales	Rhamnaceae	Kentrothamnus
The Clade Angiosperms	Actinorhizal Plants	Rosales	Rhamnaceae	Retanilla
The Clade Angiosperms	Actinorhizal Plants	Rosales	Rhamnaceae	Talguenea
The Clade Angiosperms	Actinorhizal Plants	Rosales	Rhamnaceae	Trevoa
The Clade Angiosperms	Actinorhizal Plants	Rosales	Rhamnaceae	Ochetophila
The Clade Angiosperms	Actinorhizal Plants	Rosales	Rhamnaceae	Ceanothus
The Clade Angiosperms	Actinorhizal Plants	Rosales	Rosaceae	Cercocarpus
The Clade Angiosperms	Actinorhizal Plants	Rosales	Rosaceae	Chamaebatia
The Clade Angiosperms	Actinorhizal Plants	Rosales	Rosaceae	Cowania
The Clade Angiosperms	Actinorhizal Plants	Rosales	Rosaceae	Dryas
The Clade Angiosperms	Actinorhizal Plants	Rosales	Rosaceae	Purshia
The Clade Angiosperms	Legumes	Fabales	Fabaceae	Caesalpinia
The Clade Angiosperms	Legumes	Fabales	Fabaceae	Cercis
The Clade Angiosperms	Legumes	Fabales	Fabaceae	Detarium
The Clade Angiosperms	Legumes	Fabales	Fabaceae	Dialium
The Clade Angiosperms	Legumes	Fabales	Fabaceae	Duparquetia
The Clade Angiosperms	Legumes	Fabales	Fabaceae	Faboideae
The Clade Angiosperms	Legumes	Fabales	Polygalaceae	Polygala
The Clade Angiosperms	Legumes	Fabales	Quillajaceae	†Dakotanthus
The Clade Angiosperms	Legumes	Fabales	Quillajaceae	Quillaja
The Clade Angiosperms	Legumes	Fabales	Surianaceae	Suriana

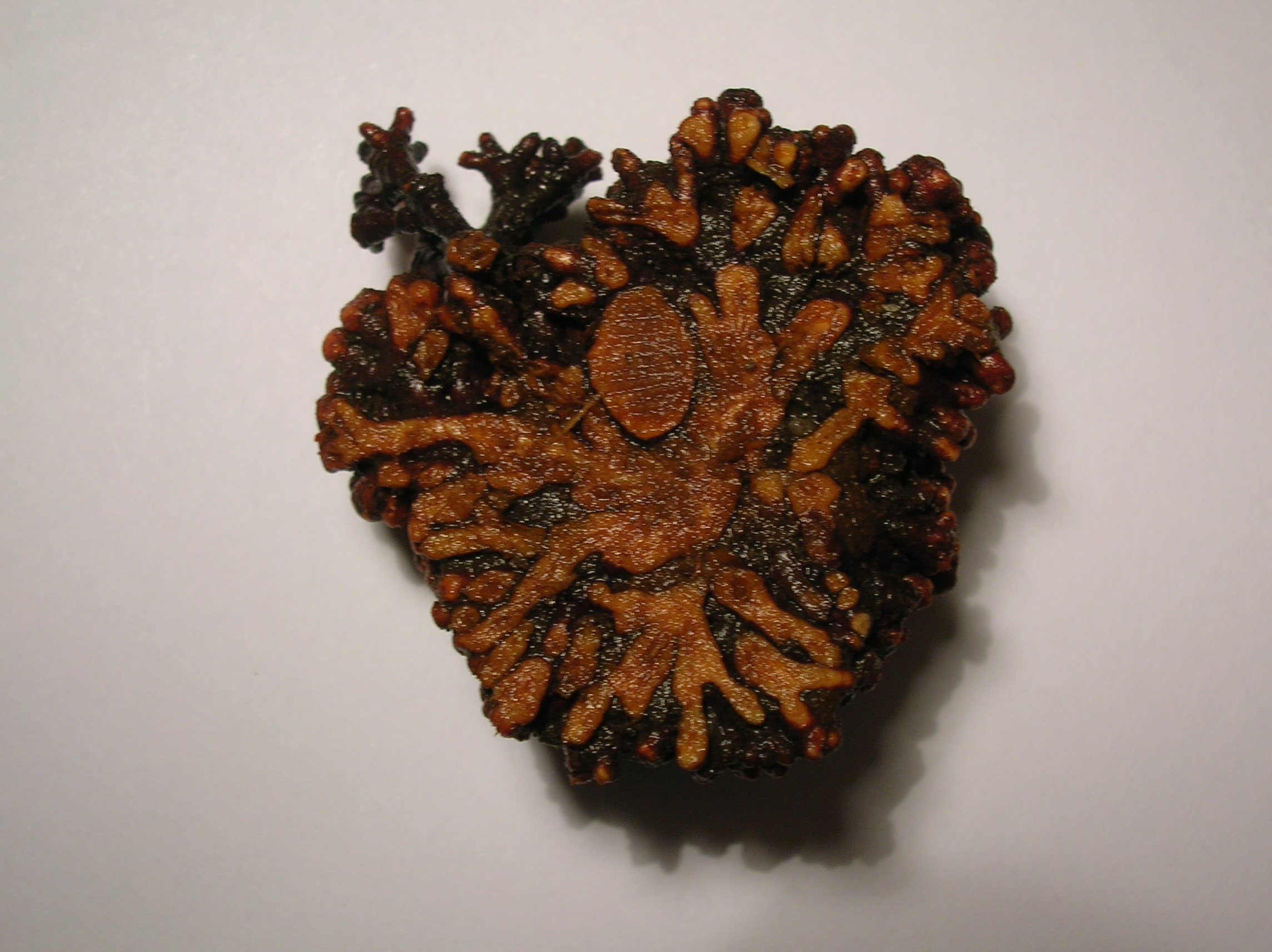
Frankia Root Nodule from Alder Tree (Alnus)

All nitrogen fixing plants are classified under the "nitrogen-fixing clade", which consists of the three actinorhizal plant orders, as well as the order fabales. The most well-known nitrogen fixing plants are the legumes, but they are not classified as actinorhizal plants. The actinorhizal species are either trees or shrubs, except for those in the genus Datisca which are herbs. Other species of actinorhizal plants are common in temperate regions like alder, bayberry, sweetfern, avens, mountain misery and coriaria. Some Elaeagnus species, such as sea-buckthorns produce edible fruit. What characterizes an actinorhizal plant is the symbiotic relationship it forms with the bacteria Frankia spp., in which they infect the roots of the plant. This relationship is what is responsible for the nitrogen-fixation qualities of the plants, and what makes them important to nitrogen-poor environments.

== Distribution and ecology ==
The distribution of actinorhizal plants.

Actinorhizal plants are found on all continents except for Antarctica. Their ability to form nitrogen-fixing nodules confers a selective advantage in poor soils, and are therefore pioneer species where available nitrogen is scarce, such as moraines, volcanic flows or sand dunes. Being among the first species to colonize these disturbed environments, actinorhizal shrubs and trees play a critical role, enriching the soil and enabling the establishment of other species in an ecological succession. Actinorhizal plants like alders are also common in the riparian forest. They are also major contributors to nitrogen fixation in broad areas of the world, and are particularly important in temperate forests. The nitrogen fixation rates measured for some alder species are as high as 300 kg of N_{2}/ha/year, close to the highest rate reported in legumes.

== Evolutionary origin ==
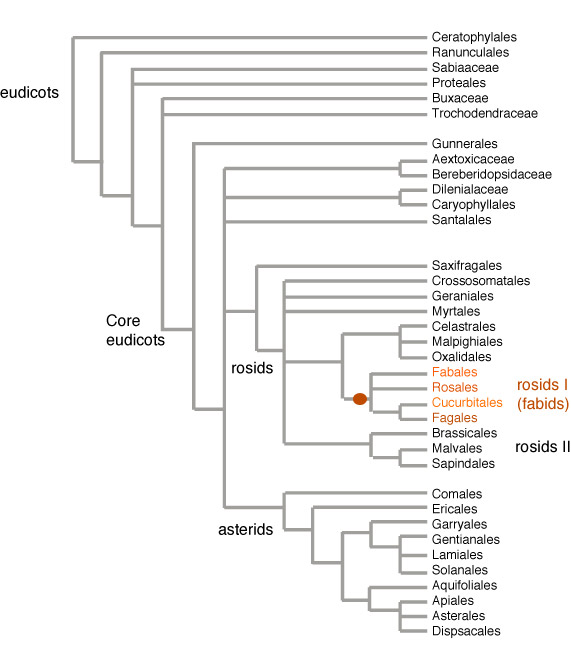
Evolutionary origin of nitrogen-fixing nodulation

No fossil records are available concerning nodules, but fossil pollen of plants similar to modern actinorhizal species has been found in sediments deposited 87 million years ago. The origin of the symbiotic association remains uncertain. The ability to associate with Frankia is a polyphyletic character and has probably evolved independently in different clades. Nevertheless, actinorhizal plants and Legumes, the two major nitrogen-fixing groups of plants share a relatively close ancestor, as they are all part of a clade within the rosids which is often called the nitrogen-fixing clade. This ancestor may have developed a "predisposition" to enter into symbiosis with nitrogen fixing bacteria and this led to the independent acquisition of symbiotic abilities by ancestors of the actinorhizal and Legume species. The genetic program used to establish the symbiosis has probably recruited elements of the arbuscular mycorrhizal symbioses, a much older and widely distributed symbiotic association between plants and fungi.

== The symbiotic nodules ==
As in legumes, nodulation is favored by nitrogen deprivation and is inhibited by high nitrogen concentrations. Depending on the plant species, two mechanisms of infection have been described: The first is observed in casuarinas or alders and is called root hair infection. In this case the infection begins with intracellular penetration of a Frankia hypha into a root hair that has curled under its influence, followed by the formation of a primitive symbiotic organ known as a prenodule. The second mechanism of infection is called intercellular entry and is well described in Discaria species. In this case bacteria penetrate the root extracellularly, growing between epidermal cells then between cortical cells. Later on Frankia becomes intracellular but no prenodule is formed. In both cases the infection leads to cell divisions in the pericycle and the formation of a new organ consisting of several lobes anatomically similar to a lateral root. Cortical cells of the nodule are invaded by Frankia filaments coming from the site of infection/the prenodule. Actinorhizal nodules have generally an indeterminate growth, new cells are therefore continually produced at the apex and successively become infected. Mature cells of the nodule are filled with bacterial filaments that actively fix nitrogen. No equivalent of the rhizobial nod factors have been found, but several genes known to participate in the formation and functioning of legume nodules (coding for haemoglobin and other nodulins) are also found in actinorhizal plants where they are supposed to play similar roles. The lack of genetic tools in Frankia and in actinorhizal species was the main factor explaining such a poor understating of this symbiosis, but the recent sequencing of three Frankia genomes and the development of RNAi and genomic tools in actinorhizal species should help to develop a far better understanding in the following years.
