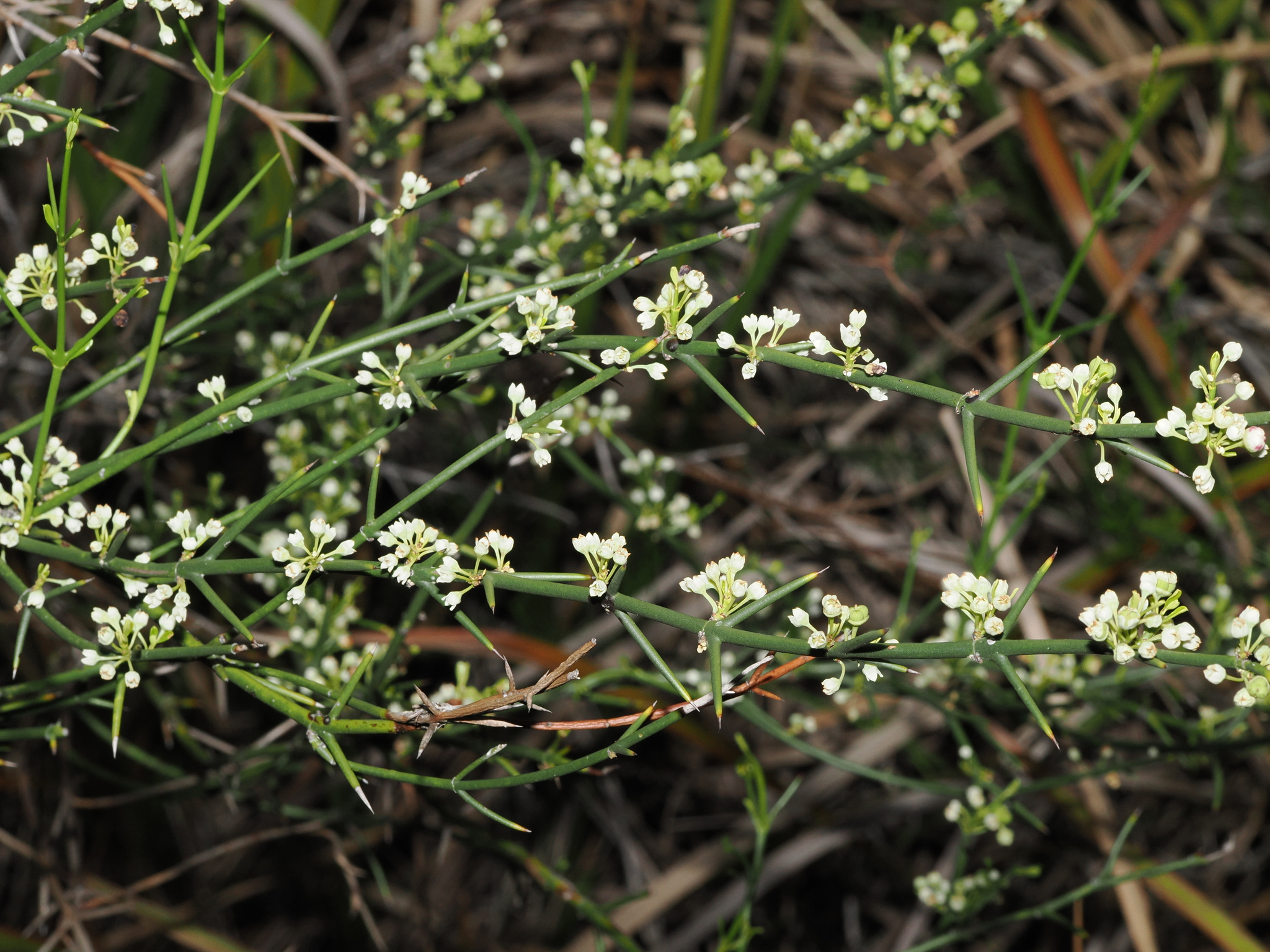

Conservation status
- Rare (NCA)

Scientific classification
- Kingdom: Plantae
- Clade: Tracheophytes
- Clade: Angiosperms
- Clade: Eudicots
- Clade: Rosids
- Order: Rosales
- Family: Rhamnaceae
- Genus: Discaria
- Species: D. pubescens

Binomial name
- Discaria pubescens (Brongn.) Druce

Synonyms
- Colletia pubescens Brongn.

= Discaria pubescens =

Species of flowering plant

Discaria pubescens, the hairy anchor plant or Australian anchor plant, is a species of flowering plant in the family Rhamnaceae. It is native to Tasmania, Victoria, New South Wales and Queensland in Australia.
