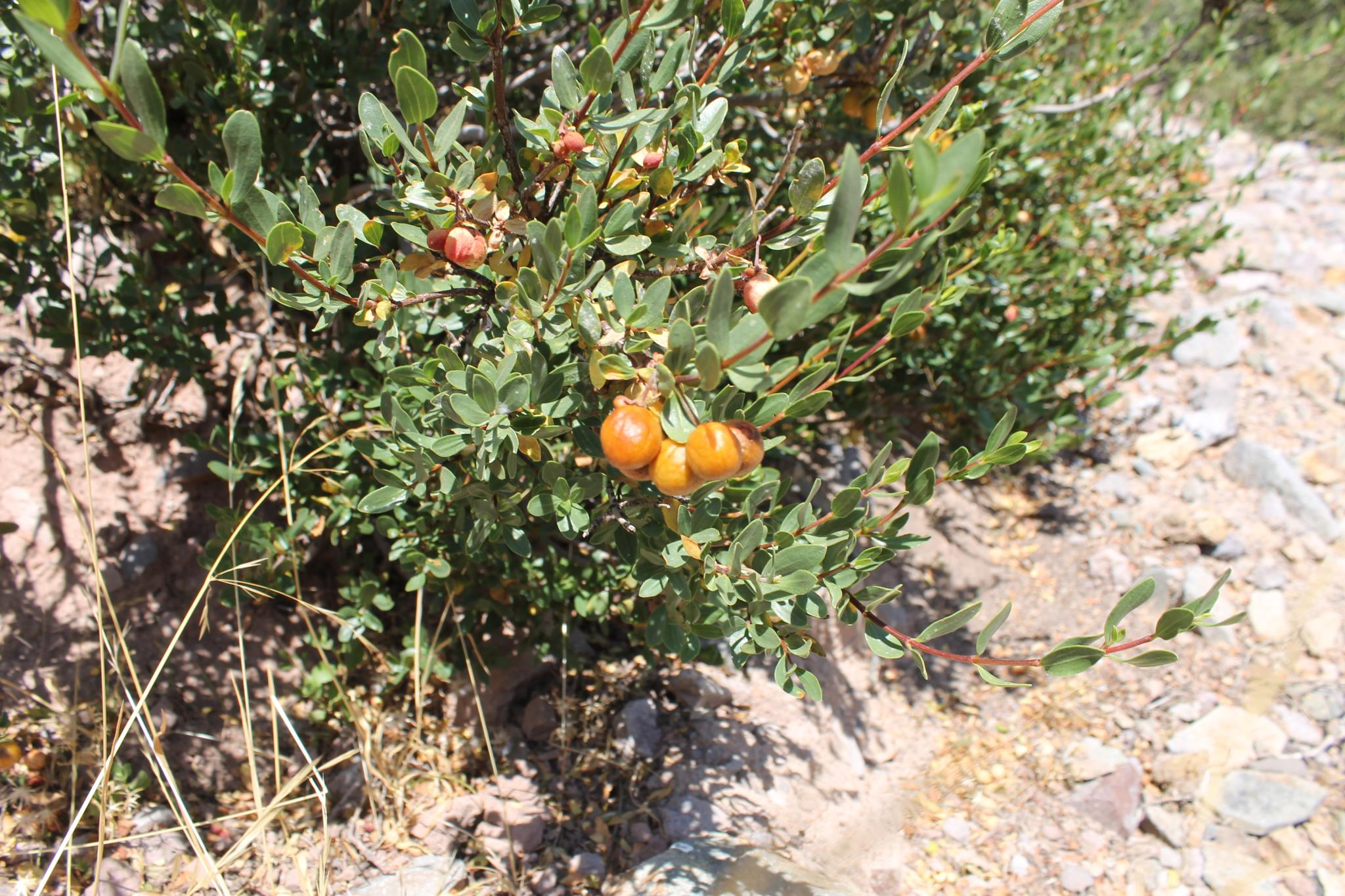
- Ochetophila trinervis

Scientific classification
- Kingdom: Plantae
- Clade: Tracheophytes
- Clade: Angiosperms
- Clade: Eudicots
- Clade: Rosids
- Order: Rosales
- Family: Rhamnaceae
- Tribe: Colletieae
- Genus: Ochetophila; Poepp. ex Endl.

= Ochetophila =

Genus of flowering plants

Ochetophila is a genus of flowering plants in the family Rhamnaceae, native to Chile and Argentina. The species in this genus are actinorhizal plants.

== Taxonomy ==
=== Species ===
Ochetophila comprises the following species:

- Ochetophila nana (Clos) Kellermann, Medan & Aagesen
- Ochetophila trinervis (Gillies ex Hook.) Poepp. ex Endl.

=== Species names with uncertain taxonomic status ===
The status of the following species and hybrids is unresolved:

- Ochetophila parvifolia Miers
