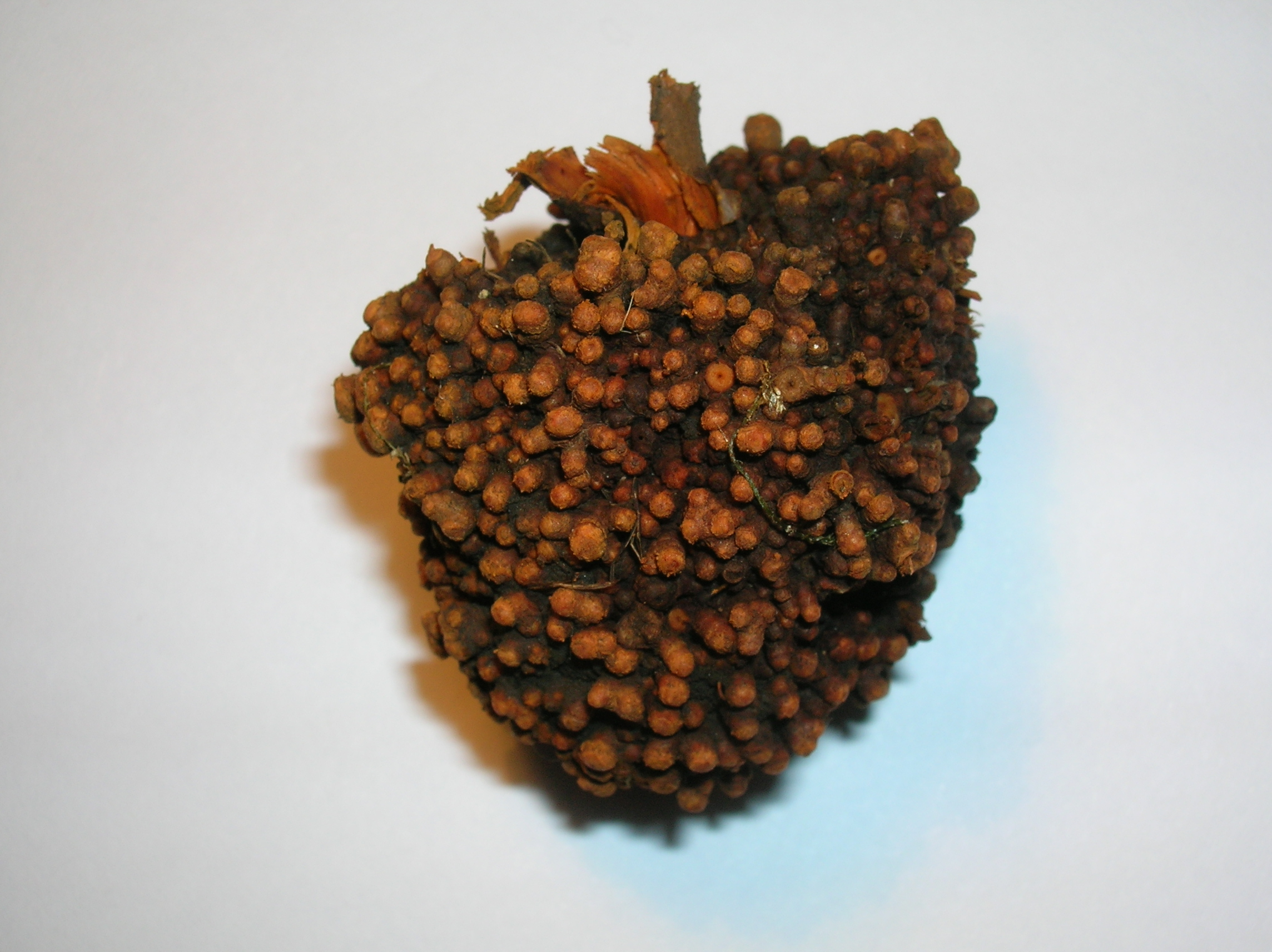
- An alder root nodule.

Scientific classification
- Domain: Bacteria
- Kingdom: Bacillati
- Phylum: Actinomycetota
- Class: Actinomycetes
- Order: Frankiales
- Family: Frankiaceae; Becking 1970 (Approved Lists 1980)
- Genus: Frankia; Brunchorst 1886

Type species
- Frankia alni (Woronin 1866) Von Tubeuf 1895 non Steud. 1840

Species
- See text

Synonyms
- Frankiella Maire and Tison 1909 non von Speschnew 1900 non Racheboeuf 1983; Parafrankia Gtari 2023; Protofrankia Gtari 2023; Pseudofrankia Gtari 2023

= Frankia =

Genus of bacteria

Frankia is a genus of nitrogen-fixing bacteria that live in symbiosis with actinorhizal plants, similar to the Rhizobium bacteria found in the root nodules of legumes in the family Fabaceae. Frankia also initiate the forming of root nodules.

This genus was originally named by Jørgen Brunchorst, in 1886 to honor the German biologist Albert Bernhard Frank. Brunchorst considered the organism he had identified to be a filamentous fungus. Becking redefined the genus in 1970 as containing prokaryotic actinomycetes and created the family Frankiaceae within the Actinomycetales. He retained the original name of Frankia for the genus.

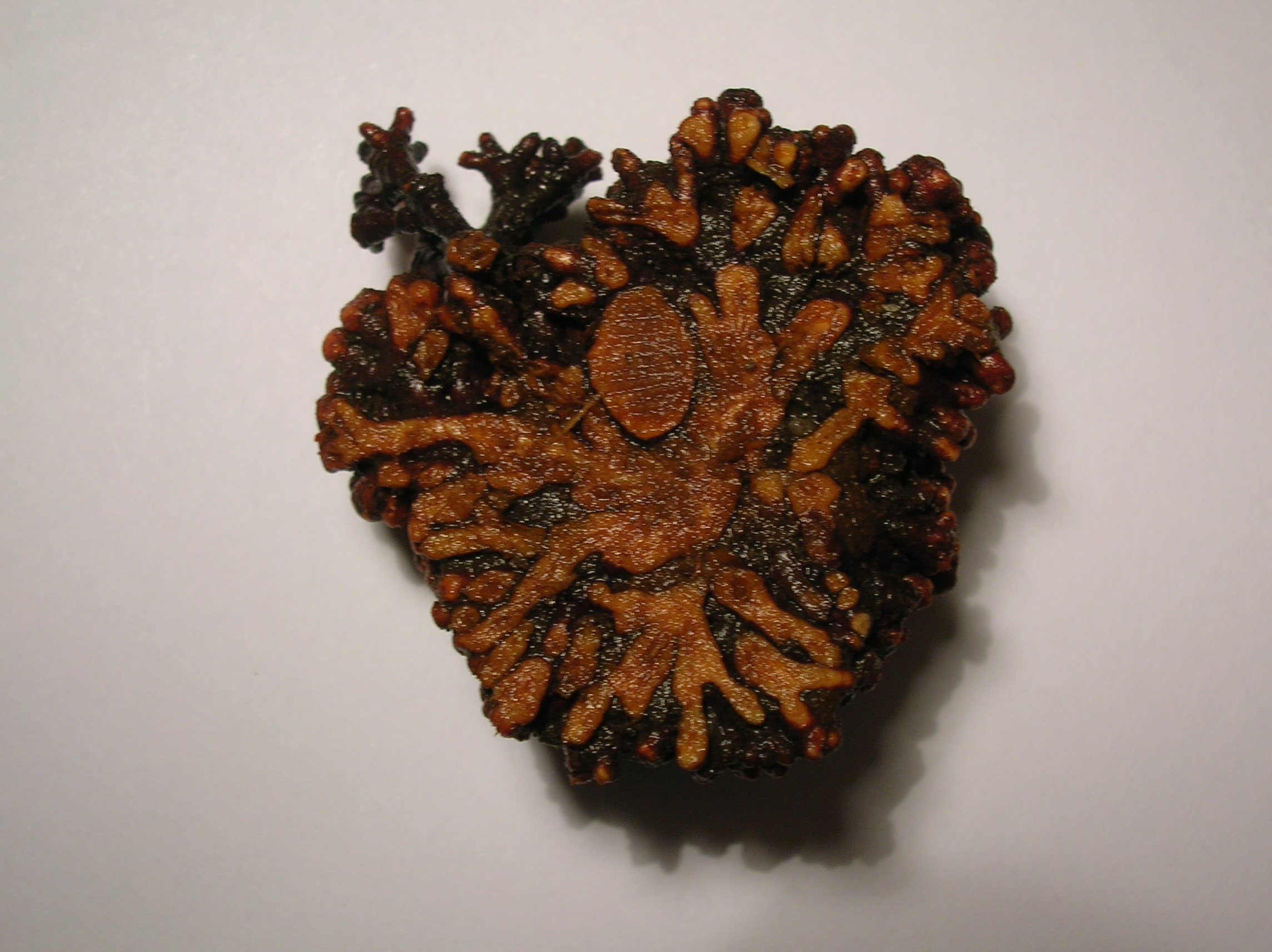
A section through an alder root nodule

== Overview ==
Most Frankia strains are specific to different plant species. The bacteria are filamentous and convert atmospheric nitrogen into ammonia via the enzyme nitrogenase, a process known as nitrogen fixation. They do this while living in root nodules on actinorhizal plants. The bacteria can supply most or all of the nitrogen requirements of the host plant. As a result, actinorhizal plants colonise and often thrive in soils that are low in plant nutrients.

Several Frankia genomes are now available which may help clarify how the symbiosis between prokaryote and plant evolved, how the environmental and geographical adaptations occurred, the metabolic diversity, and the horizontal gene flow among the symbiotic prokaryotes.

Frankia can resist low concentration of heavy metals such as, Cu, Co, and Zn. Frankia may be an advantage for degraded soil. Degraded soil is known as soil that is heavy metal rich or nutrient depleted due to a drought. Frankia is a nitrogen-fixed organism, explaining why it is able to resist heavy metals.

Frankia is a gram-positive Bacteria that is found on the roots of plants. The fact that Frankia is gram-positive means that the bacteria is made up of thick cell walls made out of protein called peptidoglycan. This helps with the resistance of the heavy metals that may be in the degraded soil.

Frankia tolerates a narrow range of temperatures and soil pH levels. It grows best at around 30 degrees Celsius with an environment pH between 6.5 and 7. These facts shows that Frankia is very sensitive to its environment. Though Frankia would not be suitable for all agriculture it does demonstrate possibilities in select areas, or in temperature controlled environments.

== Symbiont plants ==
- All species in the genus Alnus in the family Betulaceae
- Some species in all four genera in the family Casuarinaceae
- Certain species in the genus Coriaria in the family Coriariaceae
- Datisca cannabina and Datisca glomerata in the family Datiscaceae
- All species in the three genera in the family Elaeagnaceae, Elaeagnus, Shepherdia, and Hippophae
- All species in the genera Myrica, Morella, and Comptonia in the family Myricaceae.
- All species in six genera in the family Rhamnaceae, Ceanothus, Colletia, Discaria, Trevoa, and possibly Adolphia
- Some species in the family Rosaceae including all the species in the genera Cercocarpus, Cowania, Purshia, Chamaebatia, and some species of Dryas

== Nodule formation ==
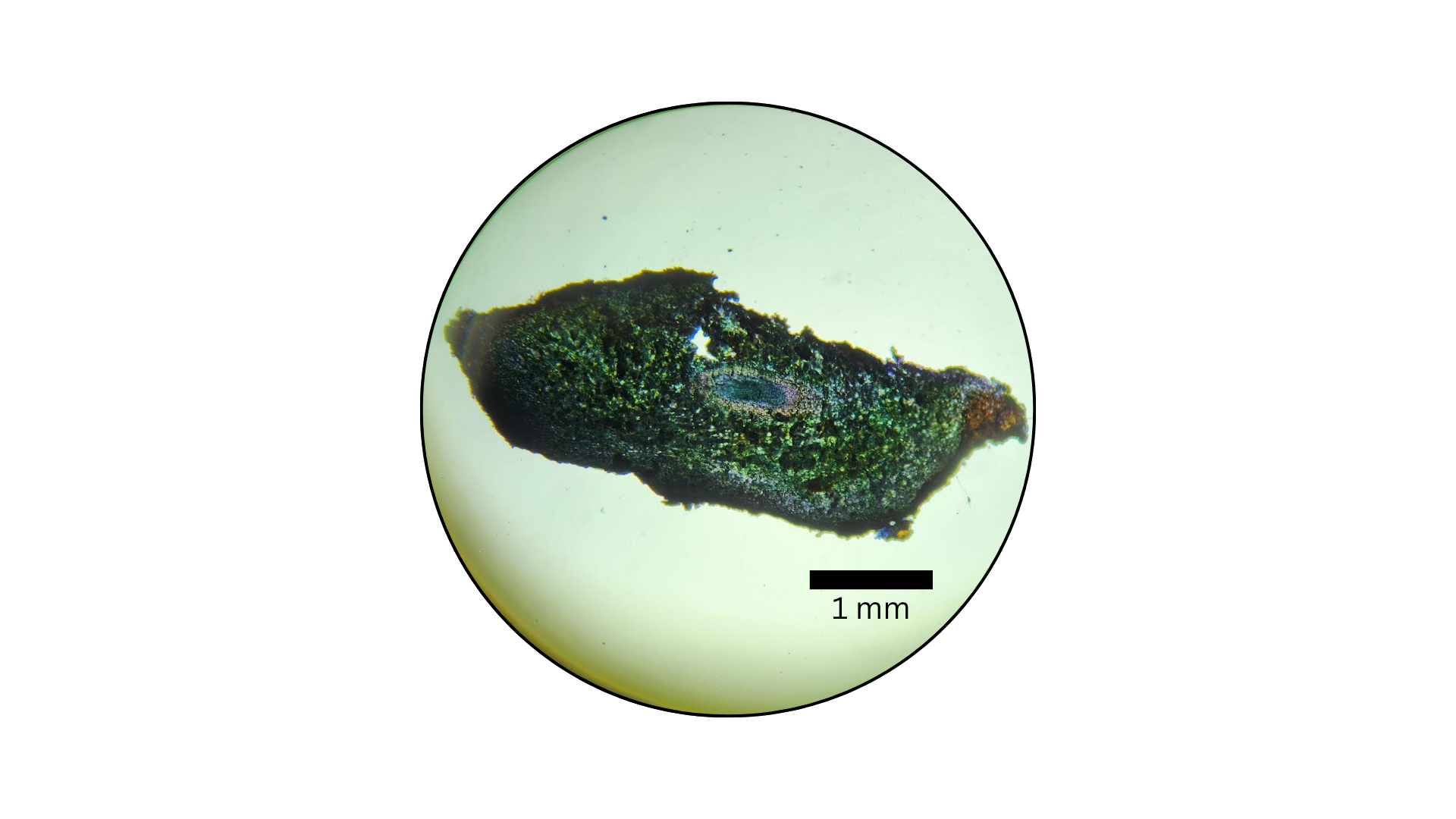
Longitudinal section of a Frankia nodule dyed with toluidine blue to highlight the vascular tissue in blue and purple.

Frankia forms nodules via two methods of root infection, intercellularly and intracellularly. Intracellular infection is characterized by initial root-hair deformation which is then infected by the filamentous Frankia. The Frankia then moves within the root cells and forms a pre-nodule which is characterized by a bump on the root. This then gives rise to a nodule primordium which feeds the bacteria via the vascular tissue of the plant allowing the nodule to mature.

In contrast the intercellular infection does not have root hair deformation. Instead, the filamentous Frankia invades the roots in the space between cells on the root. After this invasion a nodule primordium is created similarly to the intracellular mode of formation and the nodule matures.

== Phylogeny ==
The currently accepted taxonomy is based on the List of Prokaryotic names with Standing in Nomenclature (LPSN) and National Center for Biotechnology Information (NCBI).

16S rRNA based LTP_10_2024

- Frankia
  - F. coriariae Nouioui et al. 2017
  - - - - F. casuarinae Nouioui et al. 2016
        - F. canadensis Normand et al. 2018
      - - F. umida Normand et al. 2023
        - - F. alni (Woronin 1866) Von Tubeuf 1895
          - - F. torreyi Nouioui et al. 2019
            - - "F. gtarii" Nouioui et al. 2023
              - "F. tisai" Nouioui et al. 2023
    - - - F. inefficax Nouioui et al. 2017
        - - F. asymbiotica Nouioui et al. 2017
          - F. saprophytica Nouioui et al. 2018
      - - F. discariae Nouioui et al. 2017
        - - F. soli Gtari et al. 2020
          - - F. irregularis Nouioui et al. 2018
            - - F. colletiae Nouioui et al. 2023
              - F. elaeagni (Schroeter 1886) Becking
                1970 ex Nouioui et al. 2016

120 marker proteins based GTDB 10-RS226

- - - Protofrankia
      - "Ca. Frankia meridionalis" Nguyen et al. 2019
      - - "Ca. P. californiensis" Gtari 2022
        - P. coriariae [incl. "Ca. P. datiscae" (Persson et al. 2011) Gtari 2022]
  - - - Pseudofrankia
        - Frankia nepalensis Nouioui et al. 2023
        - - P. inefficax
          - - P. asymbiotica
            - P. saprophytica
    - - Parafrankia
        - - P. discariae
          - P. soli
        - - P. irregularis
          - - P. colletiae
            - P. elaeagni
      - Frankia
        - F. casuarinae
        - - - F. canadensis
            - F. umida ["Ca. F. nodulisporulans" Herrera-Belaroussi et al. 2020]
          - - - F. alni
              - F. torreyi
            - - "F. tisai"
              - - "Ca. F. alpina" Pozzi et al. 2020 [incl. "F. subtilis" Brunchorst 1886]
                - "F. gtarii"

== See also ==
- List of bacterial orders
- List of bacteria genera
