= Ceuthostoma =

Scientific classification
- Kingdom: Plantae
- Clade: Tracheophytes
- Clade: Angiosperms
- Clade: Eudicots
- Clade: Rosids
- Order: Fagales
- Family: Casuarinaceae
- Genus: Ceuthostoma; L.A.S.Johnson

Species
- See text

Genus of flowering plants

Ceuthostoma is a genus of two species of trees, constituting part of the plant family Casuarinaceae.

They grow naturally only in Malesia, in the islands of Palawan, Borneo, Halmahera and New Guinea.

== Species ==
- Ceuthostoma palawanense L.A.S.Johnson – (known only (endemic) from the islands of Palawan in the SW Philippines, stretching towards Borneo)
- Ceuthostoma terminale L.A.S.Johnson – (Borneo, Halmahera and New Guinea)
