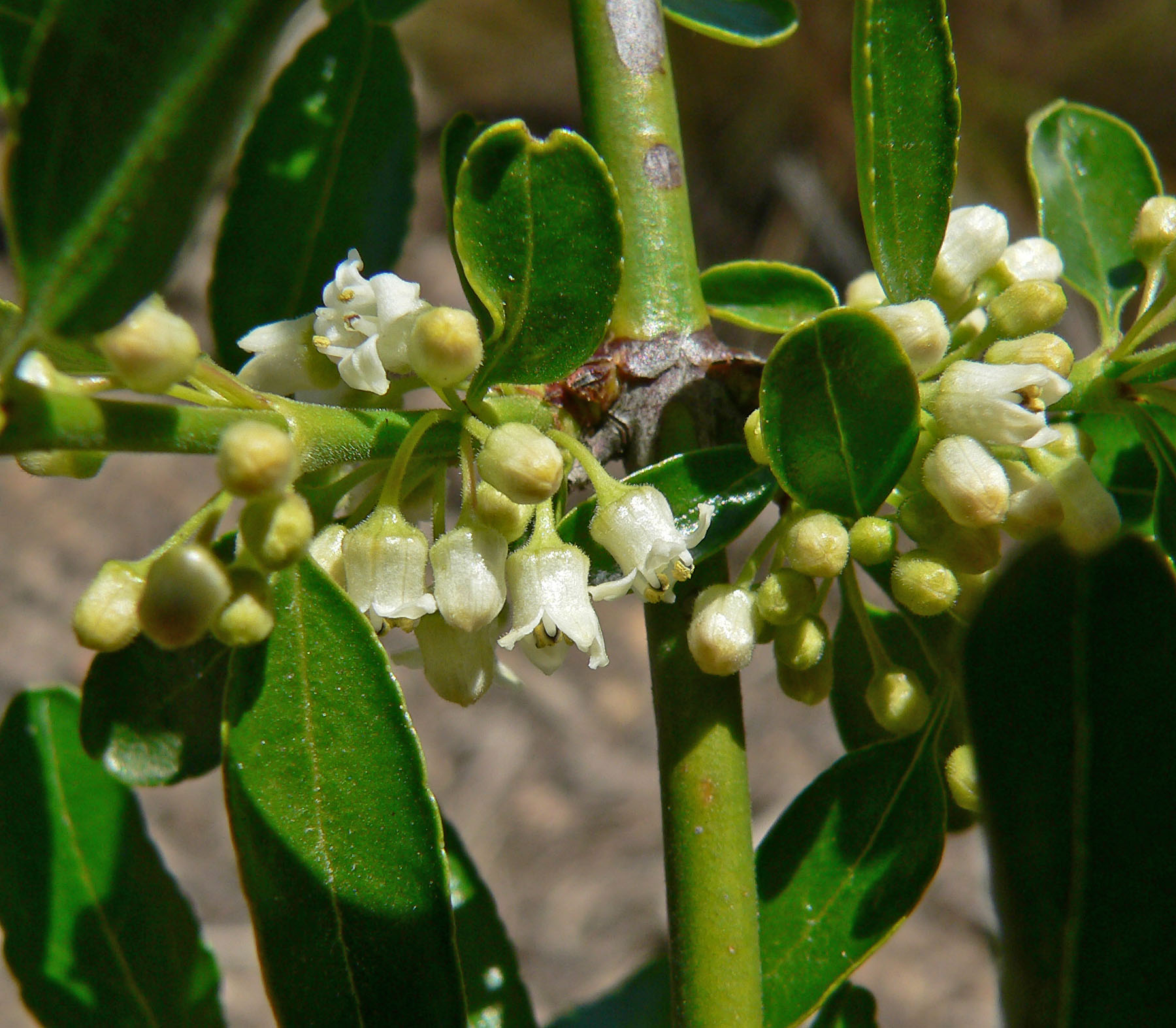
- Discaria chacaye

Scientific classification
- Kingdom: Plantae
- Clade: Tracheophytes
- Clade: Angiosperms
- Clade: Eudicots
- Clade: Rosids
- Order: Rosales
- Family: Rhamnaceae
- Tribe: Colletieae
- Genus: Discaria; Hook.

Species
- See text.

Synonyms
- Chacaya Escal.; Notophaena Miers; Tetrapasma G.Don

= Discaria =

Genus of flowering plants

Discaria is a genus of 6 species of flowering plants in the family Rhamnaceae, native to temperate regions of the Southern Hemisphere, in Australia, New Zealand and South America.

They are deciduous thorny shrubs or small trees growing to 2–5 m tall. They are also non-legume nitrogen fixers.

Many of the world's Discaria species qualify as xerophytes in the true sense of the term, and the Australian species are no exception. They frequently occur on porous or well-drained sites and on soils of low fertility. Some species can fix nitrogen from the atmosphere with the help of symbiotic bacteria (Frankia) that form nodules in their roots.

== Taxonomy ==
=== Species ===
Discaria comprises the following species:

- Discaria americana Gillies & Hook.
- Discaria articulata (Phil.) Miers
- Discaria chacaye (G.Don) Tortosa
- Discaria nitida Tortosa
- Discaria pubescens (Brongn.) Druce
- Discaria toumatou Raoul

=== Hybrids ===
The following hybrid has been described:

- Discaria × serratifolia Benth. & Hook.f. ex Mast.

=== Species names with uncertain taxonomic status ===
The status of the following species and hybrids is unresolved:

- Discaria × andina (Miers) Speg.
- Discaria aphylla Meyen
- Discaria parviflora Hook.f.
- Discaria pauciflora Hook.f.
- Discaria weddeliana (Miers) Escal.
