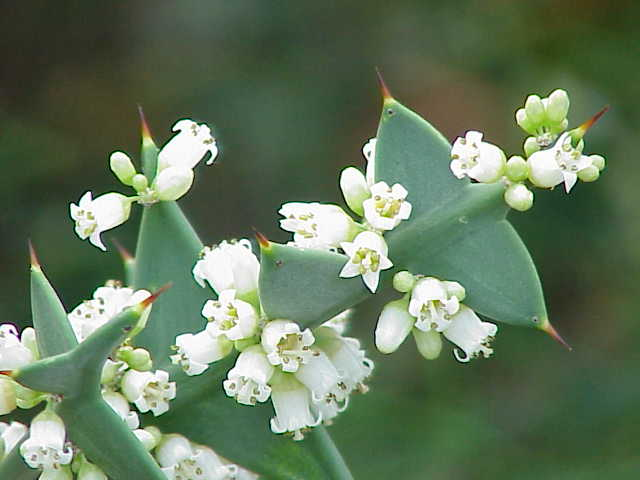
- Colletia paradoxa

Scientific classification
- Kingdom: Plantae
- Clade: Embryophytes
- Clade: Tracheophytes
- Clade: Spermatophytes
- Clade: Angiosperms
- Clade: Eudicots
- Clade: Rosids
- Order: Rosales
- Family: Rhamnaceae
- Tribe: Colletieae
- Genus: Colletia; Comm. ex Juss.

Species
- See text

= Colletia =

Genus of flowering plants

Colletia is a genus of flowering plants belonging to the Rhamnaceae family, with five species of spiny shrubs. All species of this genus are native to southern South America. They are non-legume nitrogen fixers.

== Taxonomy ==
=== Species ===
Colletia comprises the following species:

- Colletia hystrix Clos - pink crucifixion thorn
- Colletia paradoxa (Spreng.) Escal. - crucifixion thorn, thorn of the cross, anchor plant
- Colletia spartioides Bertero ex Colla
- Colletia spinosissima J.F.Gmel.
- Colletia ulicina Gillies & Hook.

=== Species names with uncertain taxonomic status ===
The status of the following species and hybrids is unresolved:

- Colletia crenata Regel (unplaced)
- Colletia cruzerillo Bertero (unplaced)
- Colletia disperma Moc. & Sessé ex DC. (unplaced)
- Colletia horrida Brongn. ex Drap. (unplaced)
- Colletia velutina Spreng. (unplaced)

=== Formerly placed here ===
- Celtis iguanaea (Jacq.) Sarg. (as Colletia iguanaea Scop.)
- Discaria americana Gillies & Hook. (as Colletia longispina Hook. & Arn. and C. longissima Steud.)
- Retanilla stricta Hook. & Arn. (as Colletia tetrandra Clos)
- Retanilla trinervia (Gillies & Hook.) Hook. & Arn. (as Colletia treba Bertero ex Colla)
- Rhamnus diffusa Clos (as Colletia maytenoides Griseb.)
- Scutia spicata (Humb. & Bonpl. ex Schult.) Weberb. (as Colletia spicata Humb. & Bonpl. ex Schult.)
- Trevoa campanulata (Phil.) Reiche (as Colletia campanulata Phil.)
- Trevoa quinquenervia Gillies & Hook. (as Colletia tralhuen Bertero ex Colla)
