= Reynosia jamaicensis =

Conservation status
- Critically Endangered (IUCN 2.3)

Scientific classification
- Kingdom: Plantae
- Clade: Tracheophytes
- Clade: Angiosperms
- Clade: Eudicots
- Clade: Rosids
- Order: Rosales
- Family: Rhamnaceae
- Genus: Reynosia
- Species: R. jamaicensis

Binomial name
- Reynosia jamaicensis M.C.Johnst.

Species of flowering plant

Reynosia jamaicensis is a species of plant in the family Rhamnaceae. It is endemic to Jamaica.
