= Charaxes grahamei =

Conservation status
- Least Concern (IUCN 3.1)

Scientific classification
- Kingdom: Animalia
- Phylum: Arthropoda
- Class: Insecta
- Order: Lepidoptera
- Family: Nymphalidae
- Genus: Charaxes
- Species: C. grahamei

Binomial name
- Charaxes grahamei van Someren, 1969

Synonyms
- Charaxes grahamei f. lacteata van Someren, 1969

Species of butterfly

Charaxes grahamei is a butterfly in the family Nymphalidae. It is found in Tanzania, where it inhabits the eastern shores of Lake Tanganyika. The habitat consists of lowland and sub-montane forests.

The larvae probably feed on Scutia species.

== Taxonomy ==
Charaxes grahamei is a member of the large species group Charaxes etheocles. Closely related to Charaxes contrarius and Charaxes petersi.
