= Ampelozizyphus amazonicus =

Conservation status
- Least Concern (IUCN 3.1)

Scientific classification
- Kingdom: Plantae
- Clade: Tracheophytes
- Clade: Angiosperms
- Clade: Eudicots
- Clade: Rosids
- Order: Rosales
- Family: Rhamnaceae
- Genus: Ampelozizyphus
- Species: A. amazonicus

Binomial name
- Ampelozizyphus amazonicus Ducke

Species of flowering plant

Ampelozizyphus amazonicus is a species of flowering plant in the family Rhamnaceae. It is a climbing shrub native to northern Brazil, Colombia, Peru, Venezuela, and the Guianas. It grows in lowland Amazon rainforest.

The species was described by Adolpho Ducke in 1935.
