= Rhamnella gilgitica =

Conservation status
- Vulnerable (IUCN 2.3)

Scientific classification
- Kingdom: Plantae
- Clade: Tracheophytes
- Clade: Angiosperms
- Clade: Eudicots
- Clade: Rosids
- Order: Rosales
- Family: Rhamnaceae
- Genus: Rhamnella
- Species: R. gilgitica

Binomial name
- Rhamnella gilgitica Mansf. & Melch.

Species of plant

Rhamnella gilgitica is a species of flowering plant in the family Rhamnaceae. It is a shrub native to the Western Himalayas (including Gilgit, where the type specimen was collected), southeastern Tibet, and southeastern Sichuan and northwestern Yunnan in south-central China.
