= Araracuara =

Araracuara may refer to:

- Araracuara, Colombia, region in Colombia
  - Araracuara Airport
  - Araracuara language
- Araracuara (plant), a genus of flowering plants in the family Rhamnaceae

== See also ==
- Araraquara
