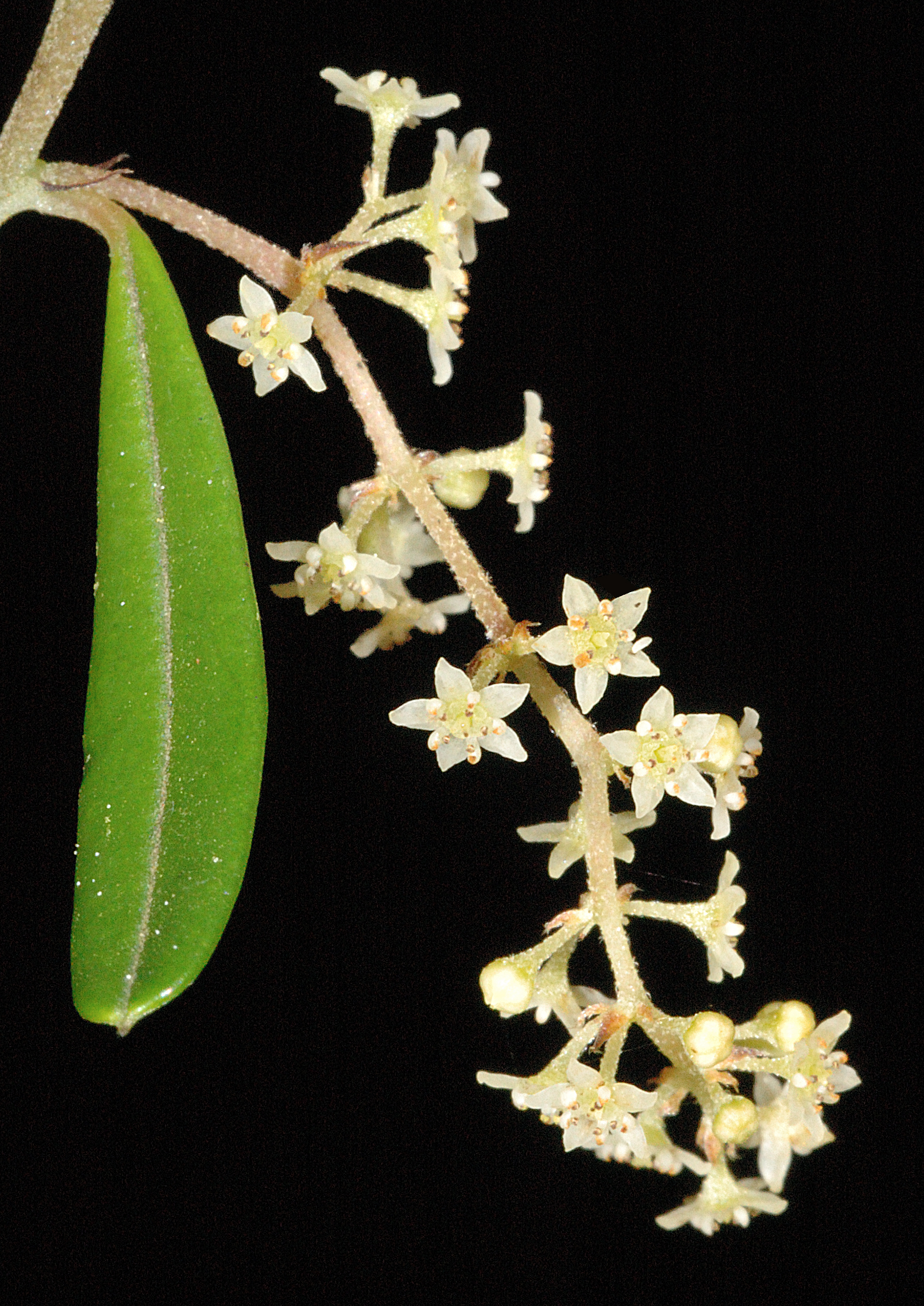
- Trymalium ledifolium var. ledifolium

Scientific classification
- Kingdom: Plantae
- Clade: Tracheophytes
- Clade: Angiosperms
- Clade: Eudicots
- Clade: Rosids
- Order: Rosales
- Family: Rhamnaceae
- Genus: Trymalium
- Species: T. ledifolium

Binomial name
- Trymalium ledifolium Fenzl

Synonyms
- Cryptandra anomala Steud. Cryptandra floribunda Steud. Cryptandra glaucophylla Steud. Cryptandra ledifolia (Fenzl) F.Muell. Pomaderris rosmarinifolia Steud. Trymalium rosmarinifolium Reissek; Trymalium vaccinioides Suess.

= Trymalium ledifolium =

Species of flowering plant

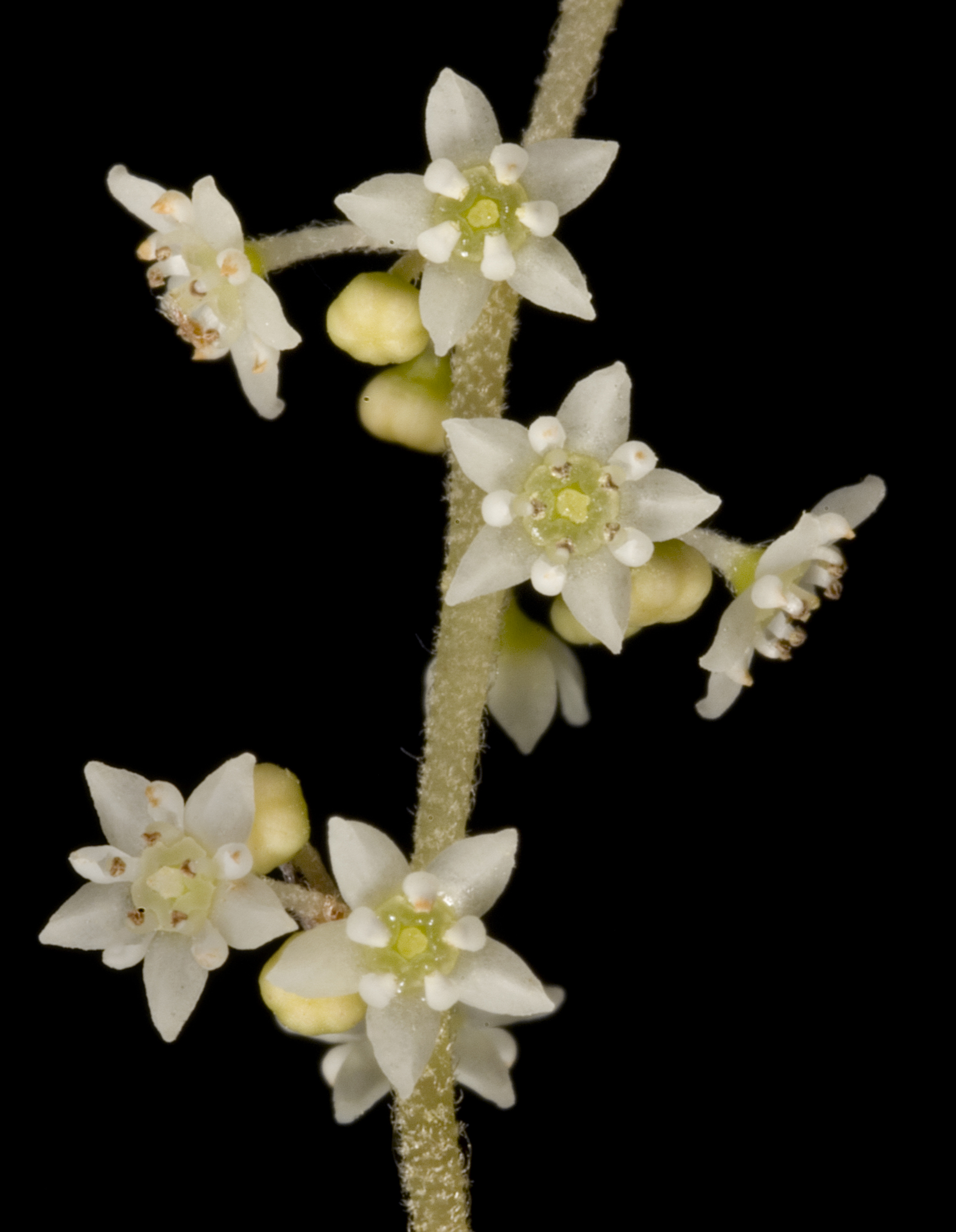
Trymalium ledifolium var. rosmarinifolium

Trymalium ledifolium, sometimes called Star Buckthorn, is a plant species in the Rhamnaceae family, found in the south-west of Western Australia. It is a shrub which grows from 0.3 to 2.5 m high, and grows on clay, gravel, loam and sand, on granite, limestone and laterite and on outcrops and dunes. Flowering from June to November, the flowers are a white-cream.

== Taxonomy ==
This species was first described in 1837 by Eduard Fenzl.

Three varieties are recognised:

- Trymalium ledifolium Fenzl var. ledifolium
- Trymalium ledifolium var. lineare
- Trymalium ledifolium var. rosmarinifolium (Steud.) Benth.

== Conservation status ==
It is deemed to be "Not threatened" under Western Australian conservation laws.
