= Rhamnidium caloneurum =

Conservation status
- Data Deficient (IUCN 2.3)

Scientific classification
- Kingdom: Plantae
- Clade: Tracheophytes
- Clade: Angiosperms
- Clade: Eudicots
- Clade: Rosids
- Order: Rosales
- Family: Rhamnaceae
- Genus: Rhamnidium
- Species: R. caloneurum

Binomial name
- Rhamnidium caloneurum Standl.

Species of flowering plant

Rhamnidium caloneurum is a species of plant in the family Rhamnaceae. It is endemic to Panama.
