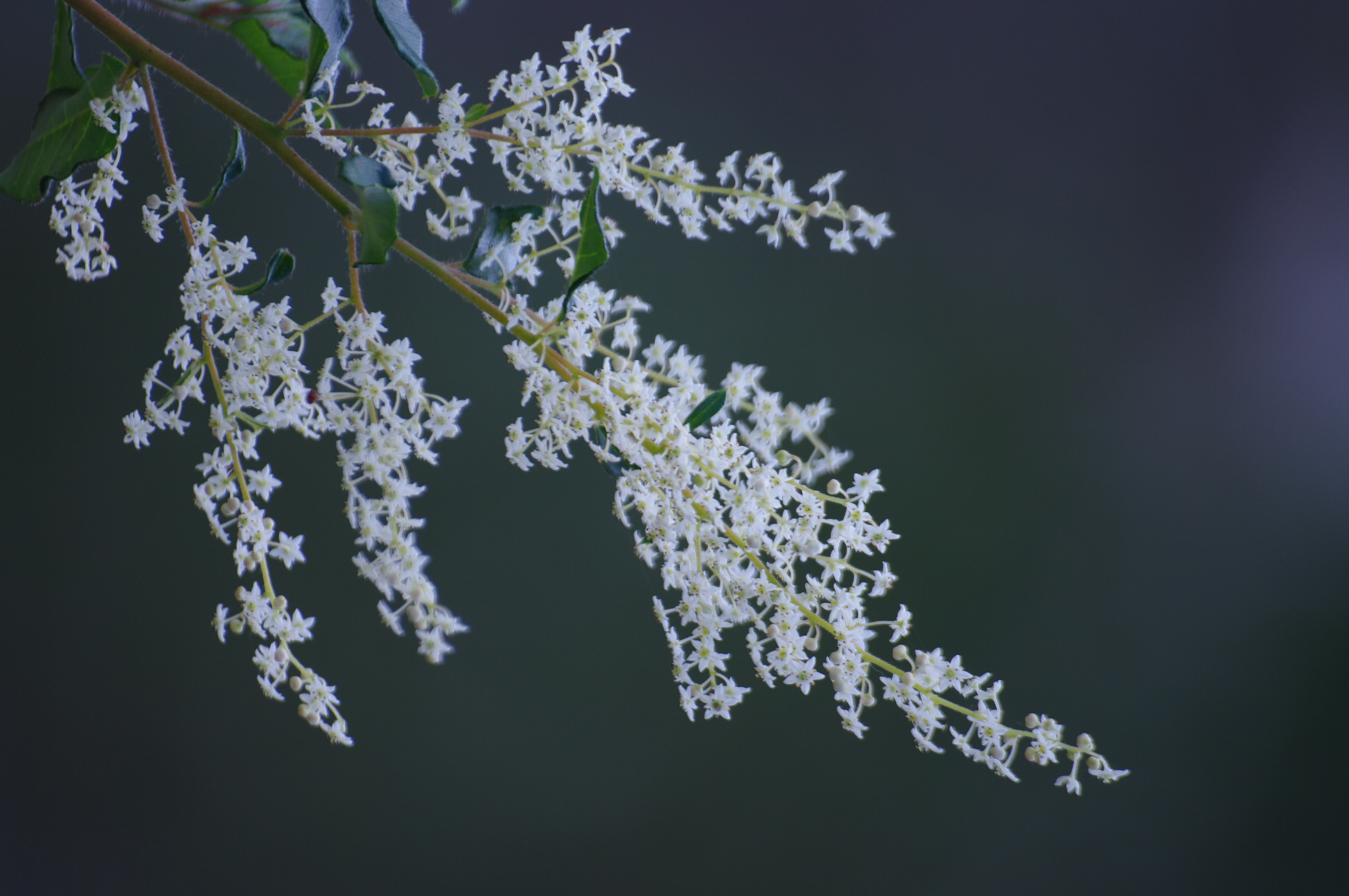

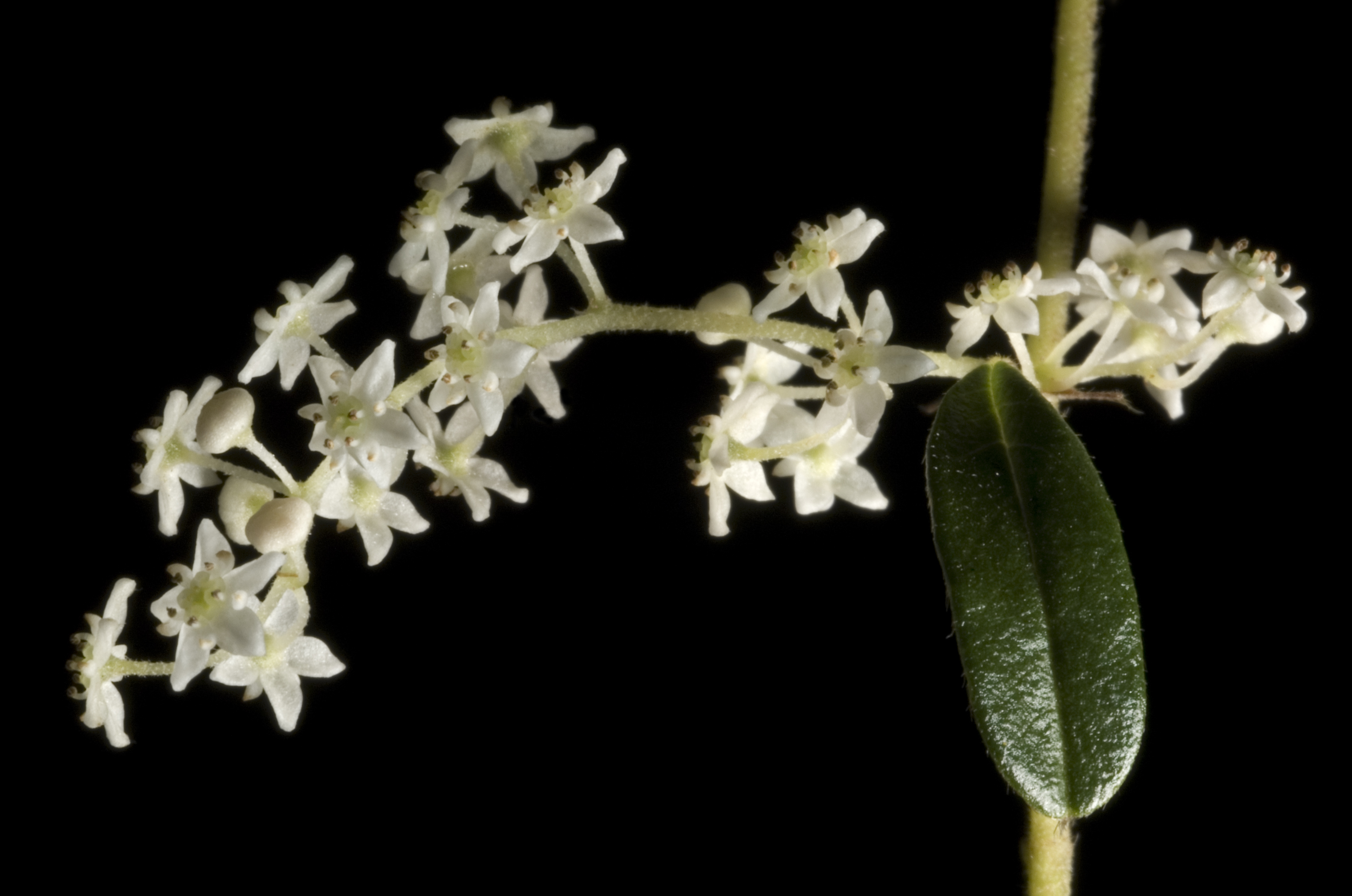
- Trymalium odoratissimum subsp. odoratissimum

Scientific classification
- Kingdom: Plantae
- Clade: Tracheophytes
- Clade: Angiosperms
- Clade: Eudicots
- Clade: Rosids
- Order: Rosales
- Family: Rhamnaceae
- Genus: Trymalium
- Species: T. odoratissimum

Binomial name
- Trymalium odoratissimum Lindl.

Subspecies
- See text

= Trymalium odoratissimum =

Species of flowering plant

Trymalium odoratissimum is a plant species found in Southwest Australia.

== Taxonomy ==
This description was published in 1838 by John Lindley in Edwards Botanical Register, who notes that Robert Mangles, of the colony's Mangles family, provided a flowering specimen to a horticultural society in London.

Two subspecies are recognised:

- Trymalium odoratissimum Lindl. subsp. odoratissimum. The nominate predominantly occurs on the Swan Coastal Plain and is found to the north of Perth.
- Trymalium odoratissimum subsp. trifidum (Rye) Kellermann, Rye & K.R.Thiele. A subspecies emerging from a revision published in 2008. The well known description Trymalium floribundum Steud. is currently regarded as a synonym of this subspecific concept. It bears the common name karri hazel and is known as djop born in the Nyungar language.
