= Rhamnidium dictyophyllum =

Conservation status
- Endangered (IUCN 2.3)

Scientific classification
- Kingdom: Plantae
- Clade: Tracheophytes
- Clade: Angiosperms
- Clade: Eudicots
- Clade: Rosids
- Order: Rosales
- Family: Rhamnaceae
- Genus: Rhamnidium
- Species: R. dictyophyllum

Binomial name
- Rhamnidium dictyophyllum Urb.

Species of flowering plant

Rhamnidium dictyophyllum is a species of flowering plant in the family Rhamnaceae. It is a tree endemic to Jamaica.
