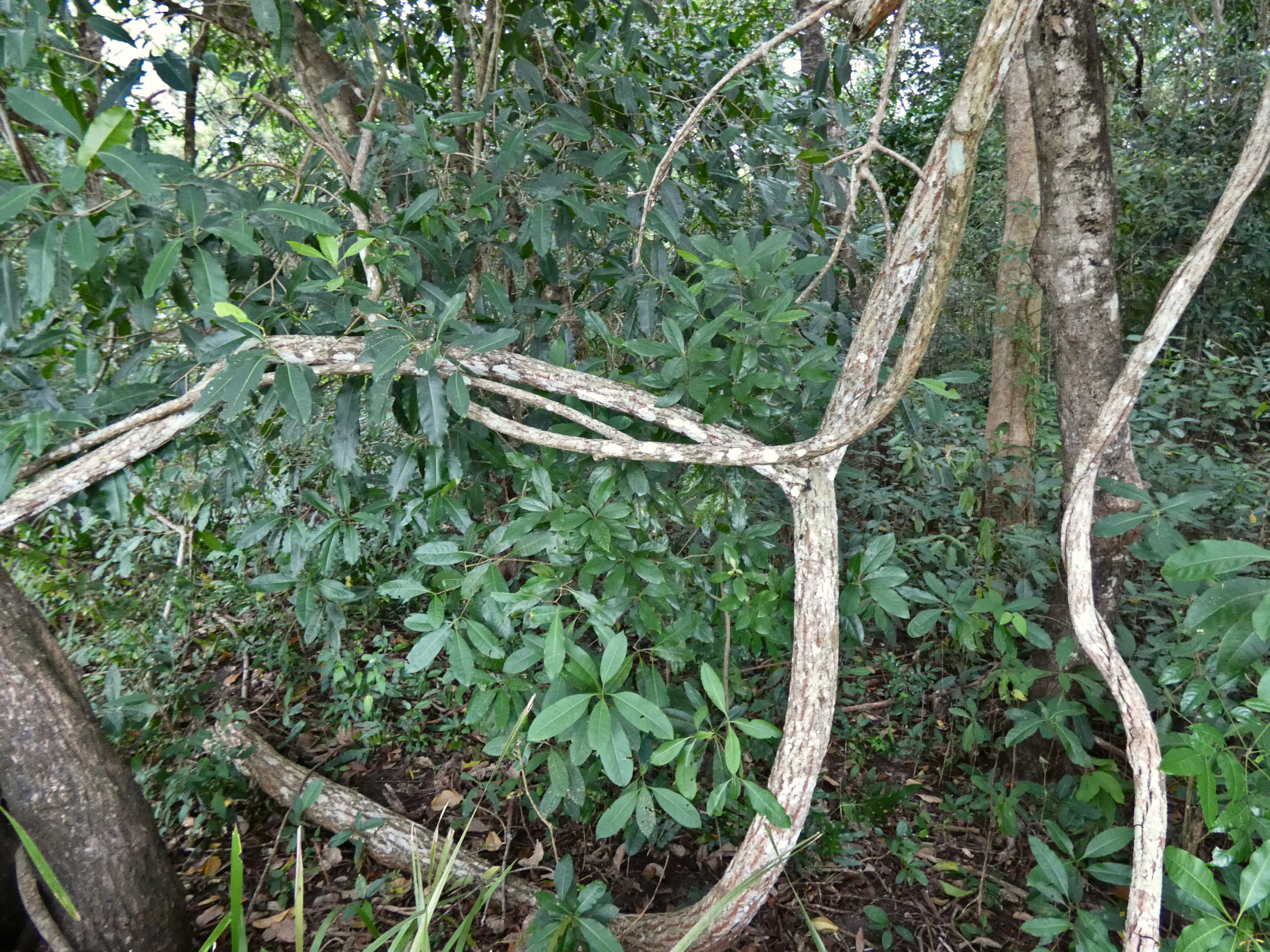
- In Cairns, Queensland

Conservation status
- Least Concern (IUCN 3.1)

Scientific classification
- Kingdom: Plantae
- Clade: Tracheophytes
- Clade: Angiosperms
- Clade: Eudicots
- Clade: Rosids
- Order: Rosales
- Family: Rhamnaceae
- Genus: Rhamnella
- Species: R. vitiensis

Binomial name
- Rhamnella vitiensis (Benth.) A.C.Smith

Synonyms
- Dallachya vitiensis (Benth.) F.Muell.; Rhamnus vitiensis Benth.; Berchemia crenulata Pancher ex Guillaumin; Berchemia fournieri Pancher & Sebert; Colubrina vitiensis Seem.

= Rhamnella vitiensis =

Species of flowering plant

Rhamnella vitiensis is a species of flowering plant in the family Rhamnaceae. It is a scrambling shrub or small tree native to Fiji, New Caledonia, New Guinea, Queensland, Tonga and Vanuatu.

== Description ==
Rhamnella vitiensis is a scrambling shrub or vine with a stem diameter up to 8 cm (3.1 in). The stem bark has a plaited appearance, the leaves are simple (without divisions or lobes) and are arranged alternately on the twigs. They can be upt to 12 cm (4.7 in) long and 5 cm (2.0 in) wide, and are attached to the twigs by a petiole about 1 cm (0.4 in) long. About six or seven curved veins are present on either side of the midrib.

Inflorescences are borne in the leaf axils and take the form of a cyme. The flowers are pale green and about 4 mm (0.16 in) diameter. The fruit is a black ellipsoid drupe about 8–10 mm (0.31–0.39 in) long, containing one seed.

== Distribution and habitat ==
In Australia this species occurs along much of Queensland's east coast, from the top of Cape York Peninsula to about Bundaberg, at elevations from sea level to about 950 m (3,120 ft). In New Caledonia it occurs in the western parts of Grande Terre and the Loyalty Islands. It grows in a variety of forest types.

== Conservation status ==
As of June 2026, this species has been assessed to be of least concern by the International Union for Conservation of Nature and by the Queensland Government under its Nature Conservation Act.
