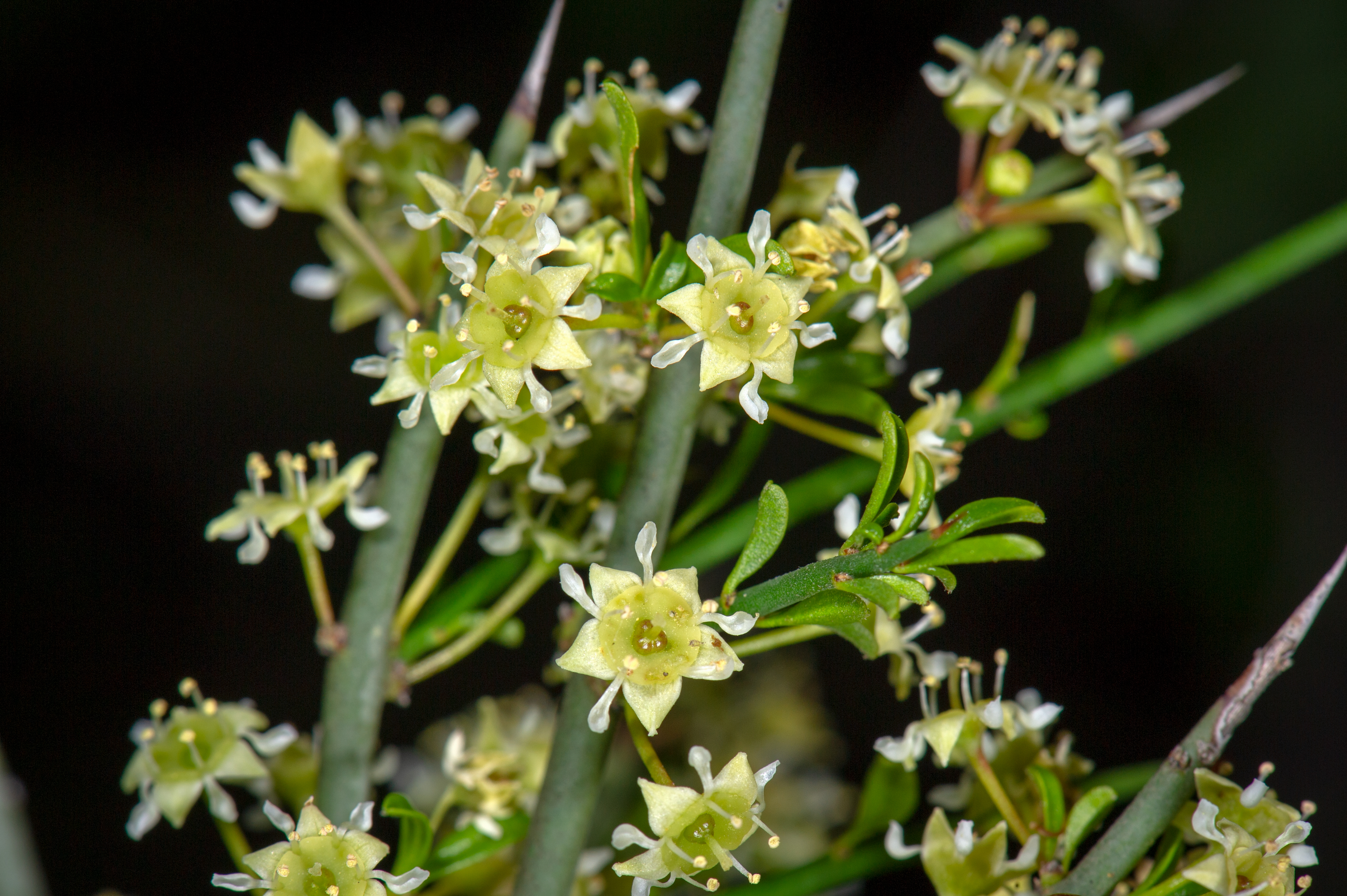

Conservation status
- Vulnerable (NatureServe)

Scientific classification
- Kingdom: Plantae
- Clade: Tracheophytes
- Clade: Angiosperms
- Clade: Eudicots
- Clade: Rosids
- Order: Rosales
- Family: Rhamnaceae
- Genus: Adolphia
- Species: A. californica

Binomial name
- Adolphia californica S.Wats.

= Adolphia californica =

Species of flowering plant

Adolphia californica, known by the common names California adolphia, California prickbush, and spineshrub, is a species of flowering shrub in the buckthorn family.

== Distribution and habitat ==
The shrub is native to the coastal plains and Peninsular Ranges foothills in northwestern Baja California and San Diego County in Southern California.

It is found in chaparral and coastal sage scrub plant communities, at elevations below 400 metres (1,310 ft).

== Description ==
Adolphia californica is a branching shrub not exceeding 1 metre (3.3 ft) in height.

It has thick hairless to fuzzy dark green twigs. The stiff twigs bear sharp thorns. The very sparse leaves are each less than a centimetre long and oval-shaped with a pointed or rounded tip.

The shrub blooms abundantly in clusters of flowers along all the branches. Each flower is a star-shaped bowl of five pointed cream-colored sepals. Between the sepals are five tiny spoon-shaped cream-colored petals. The bloom period is December to April.

The fruit is a spherical capsule about half a centimetre across.

=== Conservation ===
Within California Adolphia californica is a Critically endangered species, listed by the California Native Plant Society on the Inventory of Rare and Endangered Plants. It is threatened by urbanization, road construction, non-native plants, and grazing.
