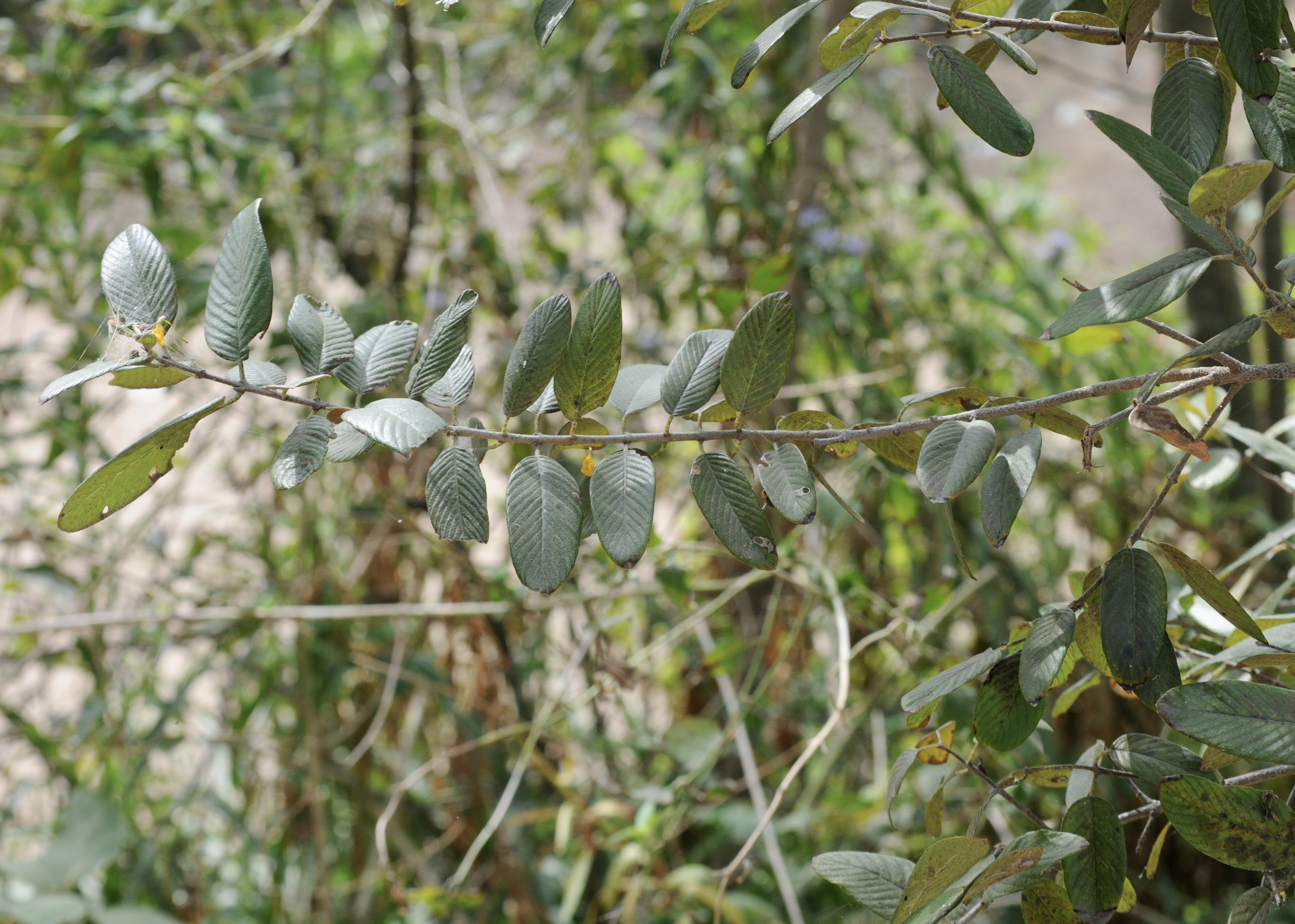

Conservation status
- Least Concern (IUCN 3.1)

Scientific classification
- Kingdom: Plantae
- Clade: Tracheophytes
- Clade: Angiosperms
- Clade: Eudicots
- Clade: Rosids
- Order: Rosales
- Family: Rhamnaceae
- Genus: Karwinskia
- Species: K. humboldtiana

Binomial name
- Karwinskia humboldtiana (Schult.) Zucc.

Synonyms
- Rhamnus humboldtiana Schult.

= Karwinskia humboldtiana =

Species of shrub

Karwinskia humboldtiana, commonly known as coyotillo, cacachila or Humboldt coyotillo, is a species of flowering shrub or small tree in the family Rhamnaceae. It is native to southern and western Texas in the United States as well as much of Mexico. The seeds and leaves of this plant contain the quinones eleutherin and 7-methoxyeleutherin and chrysophanol and β-amyrin in the fruits that are toxic to humans and livestock.

The toxins typically induce an ascending paralysis, which is often followed by death. However, it often takes days or even weeks after consumption for the symptoms to manifest. Symptoms are similar to those of Guillain-Barré syndrome.
