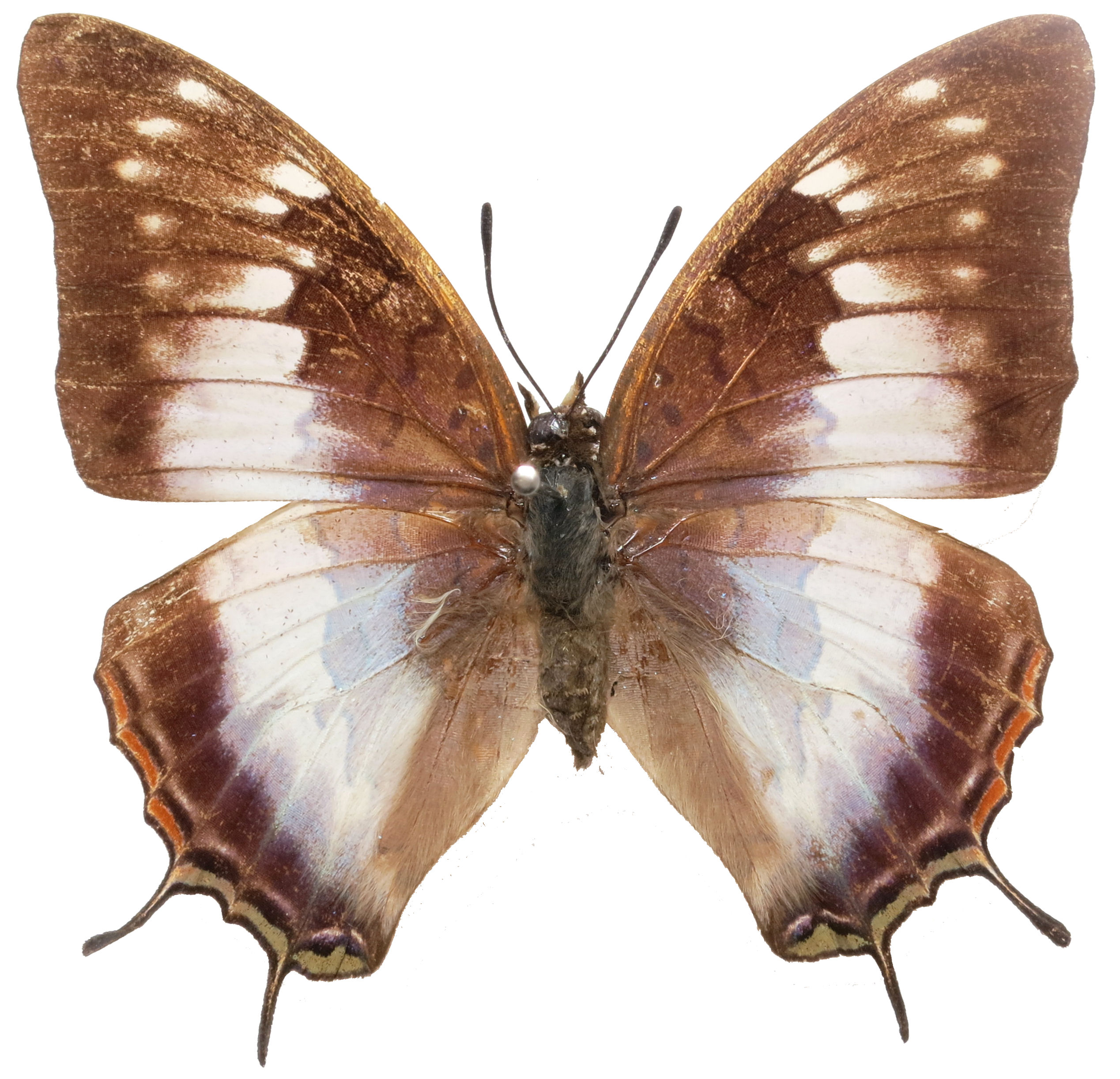
- Charaxes contrarius female form conjugens - Kibwezi, Makueni County, Kenya

Scientific classification
- Kingdom: Animalia
- Phylum: Arthropoda
- Clade: Pancrustacea
- Class: Insecta
- Order: Lepidoptera
- Family: Nymphalidae
- Genus: Charaxes
- Species: C. contrarius

Binomial name
- Charaxes contrarius Gustav Weymer, 1907

Synonyms
- Charaxes etheocles f. subargentea van Someren and Rogers, 1932; Charaxes contrarius f. conjugens van Someren, 1969; Charaxes contrarius tenebrosus Kielland, 1990

= Charaxes contrarius =

Species of butterfly

Charaxes contrarius is a butterfly in the family Nymphalidae. It is found along the coasts of Kenya and Tanzania.

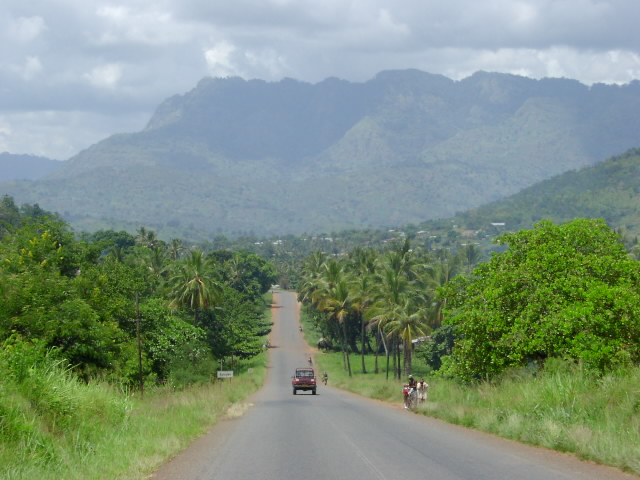
Habitat in Tanzania

The habitat consists of lowland forests, heavy coastal woodland and riverine vegetation at altitudes of near sea-level up to 700 meters.

The larvae feed on Albizia species.

== Subspecies ==
- C. c. contrarius - Coastal and Eastern parts of Kenya and Tanzania.
- C. c. lukosi Rydon, Congdon & Collins, 2007 - Inland at Kitonga Gorge, Lukosi R., in Udzungwa Mts., Tanzania

== Taxonomy ==
Charaxes contrarius is a member of the large species group Charaxes etheocles

Closely related to Charaxes etheocles, Charaxes grahamei and Charaxes petersi. The female has two main forms
