= Papistylus =

Scientific classification
- Kingdom: Plantae
- Clade: Tracheophytes
- Clade: Angiosperms
- Clade: Eudicots
- Clade: Rosids
- Order: Rosales
- Family: Rhamnaceae
- Genus: Papistylus; Kellermann, Rye & K.R.Thiele

Genus of plants

Papistylus is a genus of flowering plants belonging to the family Rhamnaceae.

Its native range is Southwestern Australia.

Species:

- Papistylus grandiflorus (C.A.Gardner) Kellermann, Rye & K.R.Thiele
- Papistylus intropubens Rye
