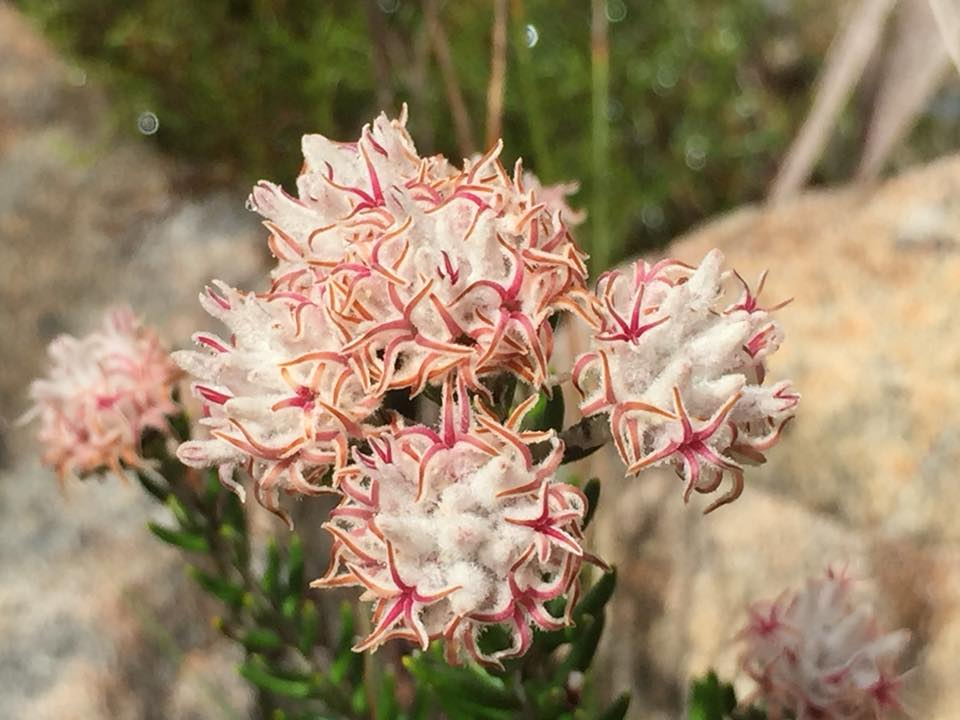
- Trichocephalus stipularis

Scientific classification
- Kingdom: Plantae
- Clade: Tracheophytes
- Clade: Angiosperms
- Clade: Eudicots
- Clade: Rosids
- Order: Rosales
- Family: Rhamnaceae
- Genus: Trichocephalus; Brongn.

Species
- Dogsface Trichocephalus stipularis (L.) Brongn.

= Trichocephalus =

Genus of flowering plants

Trichocephalus is a genus of flowering plants belonging to the family Rhamnaceae. Its native range is South Africa.
