= Reissekia =

Scientific classification
- Kingdom: Plantae
- Clade: Embryophytes
- Clade: Tracheophytes
- Clade: Angiosperms
- Clade: Eudicots
- Clade: Rosids
- Order: Rosales
- Family: Rhamnaceae
- Genus: Reissekia; Endl.

Synonyms
- Celastrus umbellatus Vell.; Gouania cordifolia Raddi; Gouania smilacina Sm.; Reissekia cordifolia (Raddi) A.Gray

Genus of flowering plants

Reissekia is a monotypic genus of flowering plants belonging to the family Rhamnaceae. It only contains one known species, Reissekia smilacina (Sm.) Steud.

It is native to (north-eastern, southern and southeastern) Brazil.

The genus name of Reissekia is in honour of Siegfried Reissek (1819–1871), an Austrian naturalist and botanist who specialized in spermatophytes. The Latin specific epithet of smilacina refers to the false Solomon's seal plant of Smilacina (part of the Asparagaceae family). The genus was first described and published in Gen. Pl. on page 1103 in 1840. Then the species was published in Nomencl. Bot., edition 2, Vol.2 on page 440 in 1841.
