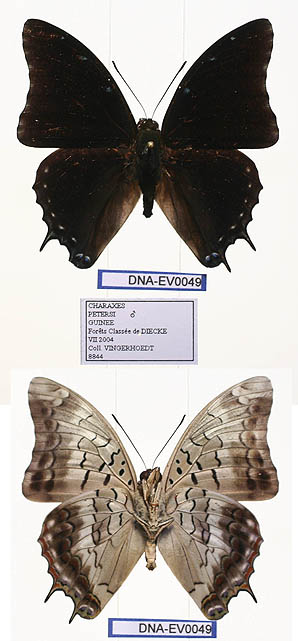

Scientific classification
- Domain: Eukaryota
- Kingdom: Animalia
- Phylum: Arthropoda
- Class: Insecta
- Order: Lepidoptera
- Family: Nymphalidae
- Subfamily: Charaxinae
- Tribe: Charaxini
- Genus: Charaxes
- Species: C. petersi

Binomial name
- Charaxes petersi van Someren, 1969

= Charaxes petersi =

Species of butterfly

Charaxes petersi, the Peters' demon charaxes, is a butterfly in the family Nymphalidae. It is found in Guinea, Sierra Leone, Liberia, Ivory Coast and Ghana. The habitat consists of primary lowland evergreen forests. It is a scarce species of Charaxes.

== Taxonomy ==
Charaxes petersi is a member of the large species group Charaxes etheocles.

Closely related to Charaxes contrarius and Charaxes grahamei
