= Doerpfeldia =

Conservation status
- Critically Endangered (IUCN 3.1)

Scientific classification
- Kingdom: Plantae
- Clade: Tracheophytes
- Clade: Angiosperms
- Clade: Eudicots
- Clade: Rosids
- Order: Rosales
- Family: Rhamnaceae
- Genus: Doerpfeldia; Urb.
- Species: D. cubensis

Binomial name
- Doerpfeldia cubensis (Britton) Urb.

Synonyms
- Sarcomphalus cubensis Britton

Genus of plants

Doerpfeldia is a monotypic genus of flowering plants belonging to the family Rhamnaceae. The only species is Doerpfeldia cubensis.

It is native to Cuba.

Its genus name is in honour of Wilhelm Dörpfeld (1853–1940), a German archaeologist, and the Latin epithet of cubensis means "coming from Cuba". Previously, it was known as Sarcomphalus cubensis Britton in 1920, before Ignatz Urban moved the genus into a separate genus of Doerpfeldia and then published it in Symb. Antill. Vol.9 on page 218.
