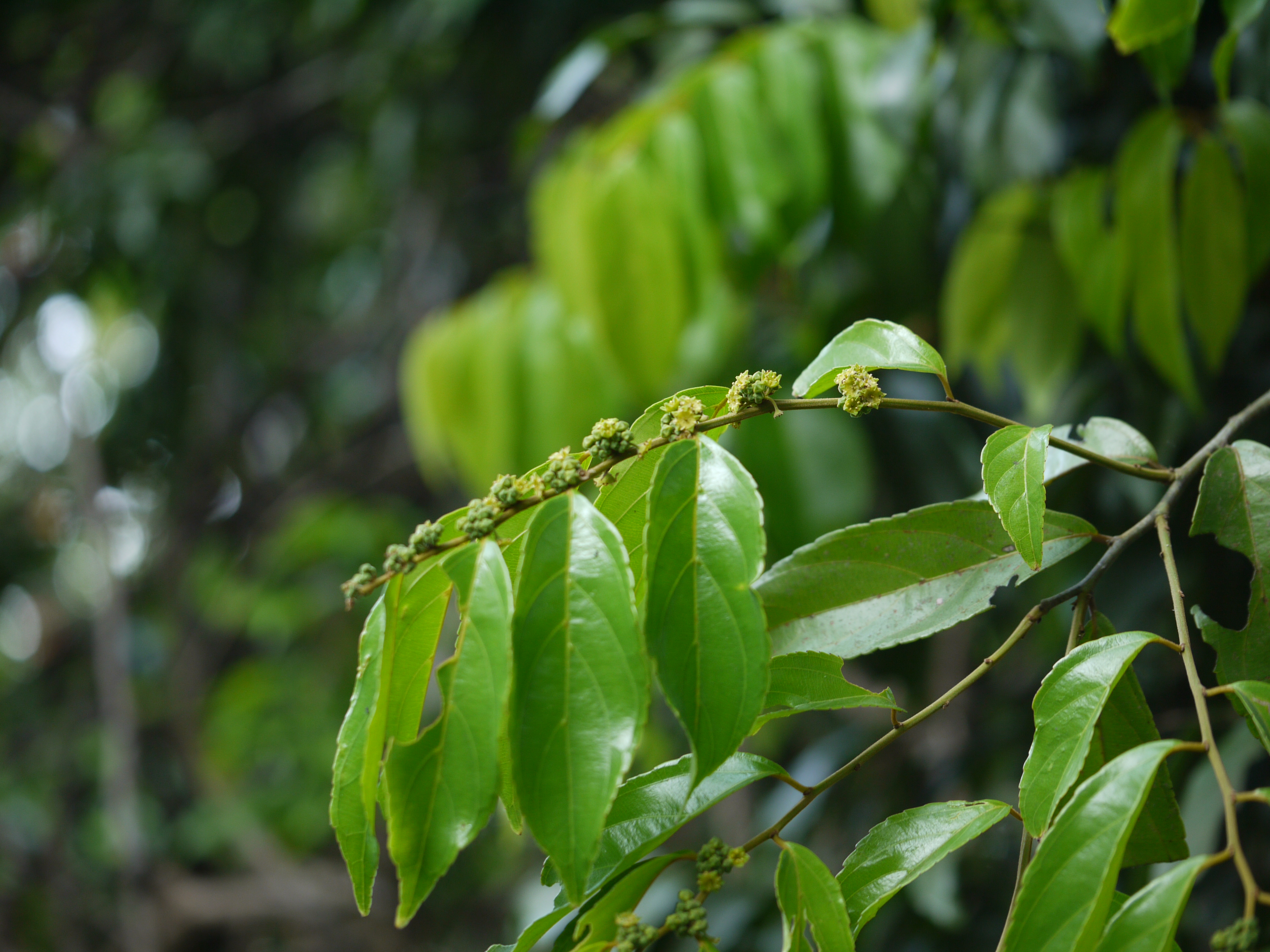
- Smythea bombaiensis

Scientific classification
- Kingdom: Plantae
- Clade: Embryophytes
- Clade: Tracheophytes
- Clade: Spermatophytes
- Clade: Angiosperms
- Clade: Eudicots
- Clade: Rosids
- Order: Rosales
- Family: Rhamnaceae
- Tribe: Ventilagineae
- Genus: Smythea; Seem.

Species
- See text

= Smythea =

Genus of flowering plants

Smythea is a genus of tropical climbing plants in the family Rhamnaceae. It includes twelve species, which occur in the Seychelles, India, South-East Asia, Melanesia and Micronesia. Smythea and Ventilago (another genus in the Rhamnaceae family) are usually grouped together in a tribe called Ventilagineae. The genus was first described by Berthold Seemann, and named in honour of William James Smythe.

List of species:

- Smythea batanensis Cahen & Utteridge
- Smythea beccarii Cahen & Utteridge
- Smythea bombaiensis (Dalzell) S.P.Banerjee & P.K.Mukh.
- Smythea calpicarpa Kurz
- Smythea hirtella Cahen & Utteridge
- Smythea lanceata (Tul.) Summerh.
- Smythea macrocarpa Hemsl.
- Smythea oblongifolia (Blume) Cahen & Utteridge
- Smythea papuana Utteridge & Cahen
- Smythea poilanei Cahen & Utteridge
- Smythea poomae Cahen & Utteridge
- Smythea velutina (Ridl.) S.P.Banerjee & P.K.Mukh.
