= Reynosia =

Scientific classification
- Kingdom: Plantae
- Clade: Tracheophytes
- Clade: Angiosperms
- Clade: Eudicots
- Clade: Rosids
- Order: Rosales
- Family: Rhamnaceae
- Tribe: Rhamneae
- Genus: Reynosia; Griseb.

Genus of plants

Reynosia is a genus of plant in family Rhamnaceae. Darlingplum is a common name for this genus.

Species include:

- Reynosia affinis Urb. & Ekman
- Reynosia barbatula M.C.Johnst. & Lundell
- Reynosia camagueyensis Britton
- Reynosia cuneifolia Urb. & Ekman
- Reynosia domingensis Urb.
- Reynosia guama Urb.
- Reynosia jamaicensis M.C.Johnst.
- Reynosia krugii Urb.
- Reynosia latifolia Griseb.
- Reynosia microphylla Ekman ex Urb.
- Reynosia moaensis Borhidi & O.Muñiz
- Reynosia mucronata Griseb.
- Reynosia regia Urb. & Ekman
- Reynosia retusa Griseb.
- Reynosia revoluta (C.Wright ex Griseb.) Urb.
- Reynosia septentrionalis Urb.
- Reynosia uncinata Urb.
- Reynosia vivesiana Trejo
- Reynosia wrightii Urb.
