= Kentrothamnus =

Scientific classification
- Kingdom: Plantae
- Clade: Tracheophytes
- Clade: Angiosperms
- Clade: Eudicots
- Clade: Rosids
- Order: Rosales
- Family: Rhamnaceae
- Tribe: Colletieae
- Genus: Kentrothamnus; Suess. & Overkott
- Species: K. weddellianus

Binomial name
- Kentrothamnus weddellianus (Miers) M.C.Johnst.

Synonyms
- Homotypic Synonyms: Discaria weddelliana (Miers) Escal.; Trevoa weddelliana Miers; Heterotypic Synonyms: Colletia foliosa Rusby; Colletia foliosa var. microphylla Kuntze; Kentrothamnus foliosus (Rusby) Suess. & Overkott; Kentrothamnus penninervius Suess. & Overkott

Genus of flowering plants

Kentrothamnus is a monotypic genus of flowering plants in the family Rhamnaceae. The only species is Kentrothamnus weddellianus. It is an actinorhizal plant that is native to Argentina and Bolivia.
