= Bathiorhamnus =

Scientific classification
- Kingdom: Plantae
- Clade: Tracheophytes
- Clade: Angiosperms
- Clade: Eudicots
- Clade: Rosids
- Order: Rosales
- Family: Rhamnaceae
- Genus: Bathiorhamnus; Capuron

Genus of flowering plants

Bathiorhamnus is a genus of flowering plants belonging to the family Rhamnaceae.

Its native range is Madagascar.

Species:

- Bathiorhamnus capuronii Callm., Phillipson & Buerki
- Bathiorhamnus cryptophorus Capuron
- Bathiorhamnus dentatus (Capuron) Callm., Phillipson & Buerki
- Bathiorhamnus louvelii (H.Perrier) Capuron
- Bathiorhamnus macrocarpus (Capuron) Callm., Phillipson & Buerki
- Bathiorhamnus reticulatus (Capuron) Callm., Phillipson & Buerki
- Bathiorhamnus vohemarensis Callm., Phillipson & Buerki
