= Ampelozizyphus =

Scientific classification
- Kingdom: Plantae
- Clade: Tracheophytes
- Clade: Angiosperms
- Clade: Eudicots
- Clade: Rosids
- Order: Rosales
- Family: Rhamnaceae
- Tribe: Ampelozizipheae; J.E.Richardson
- Genus: Ampelozizyphus; Ducke

Genus of flowering plants

Ampelozizyphus is a genus of plants in the family Rhamnaceae. It includes three species native to tropical South America:

- Ampelozizyphus amazonicus Ducke, which is known from Amazonian Peru, Colombia, Venezuela, Guyana, Suriname, French Guiana, and Brazil
- Ampelozizyphus guaquirensis W.Meier & P.E.Berry, native to the central portion of the Coastal Cordillera of Venezuela.
- Ampelozizyphus kuripacorum Aymard & Castro-Lima, endemic to Colombia
