= Rhamnidium =

Scientific classification
- Kingdom: Plantae
- Clade: Tracheophytes
- Clade: Angiosperms
- Clade: Eudicots
- Clade: Rosids
- Order: Rosales
- Family: Rhamnaceae
- Tribe: Rhamneae
- Genus: Rhamnidium; Reissek

Genus of flowering plants

Rhamnidium is a genus of flowering plants in the family Rhamnaceae.

Species include:

- Rhamnidium caloneurum Standl.
- Rhamnidium dictyophyllum Urb.
- Rhamnidium elaeocarpum
- Rhamnidium glabrum
- Rhamnidium hasslerianum
- Rhamnidium molle
