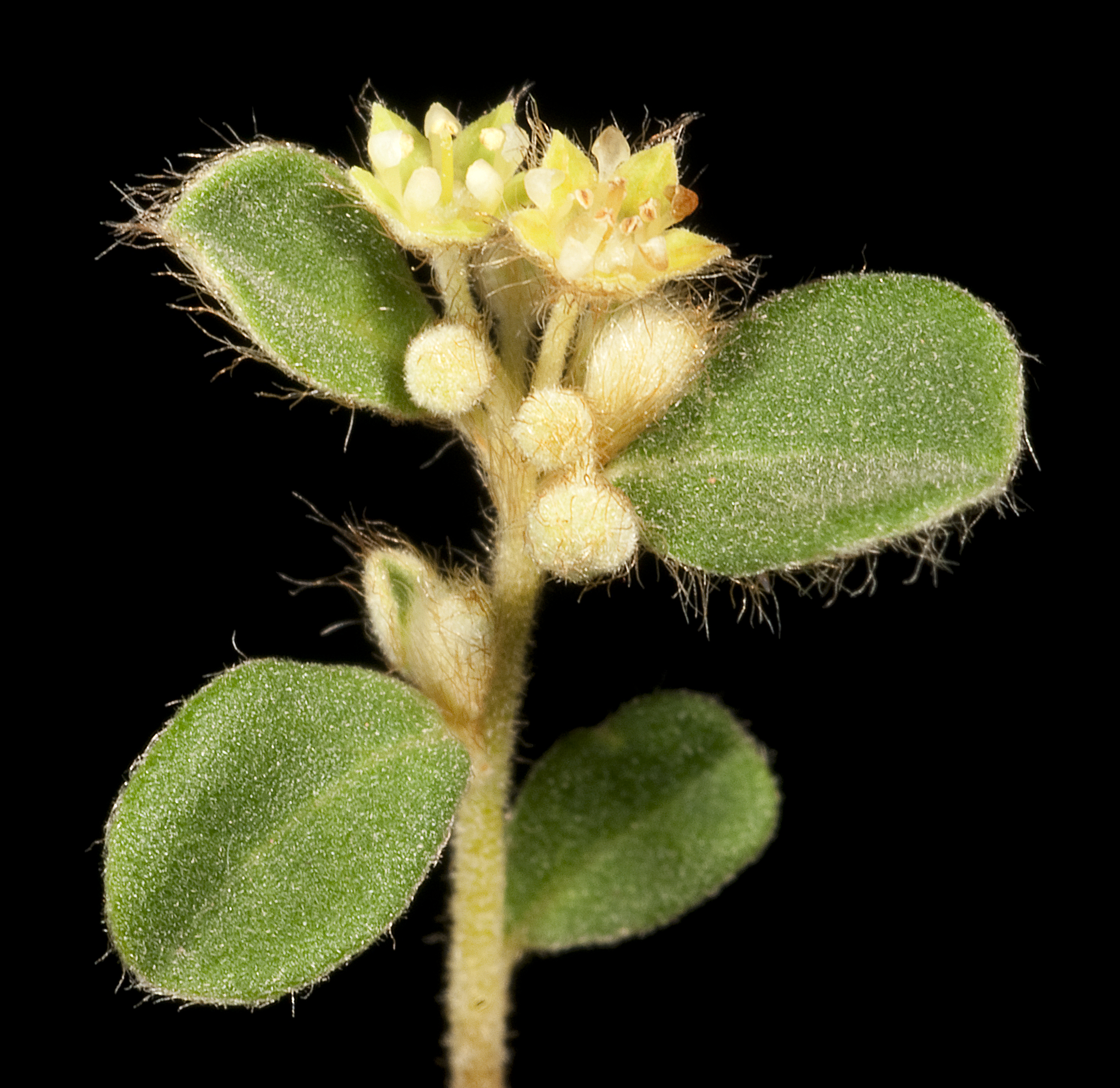
- Polianthion wichurae

Scientific classification
- Kingdom: Plantae
- Clade: Tracheophytes
- Clade: Angiosperms
- Clade: Eudicots
- Clade: Rosids
- Order: Rosales
- Family: Rhamnaceae
- Genus: Polianthion; K.R.Thiele

= Polianthion =

Genus of shrubs

Polianthion is a genus of plants in the Rhamnaceae family, first described by Kevin R. Thiele in 2006. The genus name derives from the Greek polios (grey) and anthion (little flower), and describes the small, densely grey-pubescent flowers.

== Species ==
(From GBIF)

- Polianthion bilocularis (A.S.George) Kellermann (WA)
- Polianthion collinum Rye (WA)
- Polianthion minutiflorum (E.M.Ross) K.R.Thiele (QLD)
- Polianthion wichurae (Nees ex Reissek) K.R.Thiele (WA)
