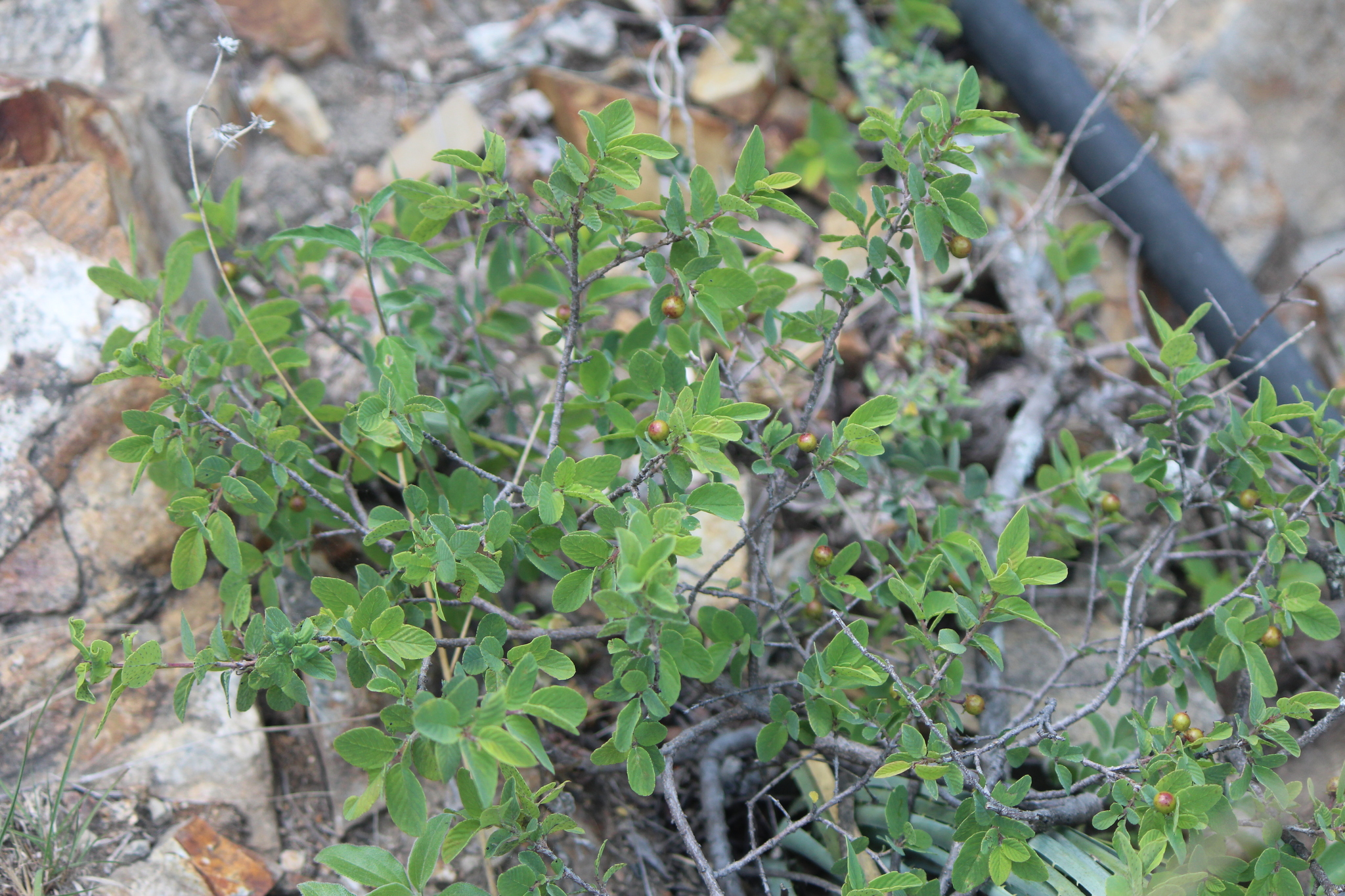
- Karwinskia subcordata

Scientific classification
- Kingdom: Plantae
- Clade: Tracheophytes
- Clade: Angiosperms
- Clade: Eudicots
- Clade: Rosids
- Order: Rosales
- Family: Rhamnaceae
- Tribe: Rhamneae
- Genus: Karwinskia; Zucc.

Species
- See text

= Karwinskia =

Genus of flowering plants

Karwinskia is a genus of flowering plants in the family Rhamnaceae.

== Species ==
- Karwinskia calderonii Standl.
- Karwinskia humboldtiana (Schult.) Zucc.
- Karwinskia johnstonii R.Fernandez
- Karwinskia latifolia Standl.
- Karwinskia mollis Schltdl.
- Karwinskia parvifolia Rose
- Karwinskia rzedowskii R.Fernandez
- Karwinskia subcordata Schltdl.
- Karwinskia umbellata (Cav.) Schltdl.
