= Fenghwaia =

Scientific classification
- Kingdom: Plantae
- Clade: Tracheophytes
- Clade: Angiosperms
- Clade: Eudicots
- Clade: Rosids
- Order: Rosales
- Family: Rhamnaceae
- Genus: Fenghwaia; G.T.Wang & R.J.Wang (2021)
- Species: F. gardeniicarpa

Binomial name
- Fenghwaia gardeniicarpa G.T.Wang & R.J.Wang (2021)

Genus of flowering plants

Fenghwaia gardeniicarpa is a species of flowering plant in the buckthorn family, Rhamnaceae. It is endemic to Guangdong Province in southeastern China. It is the sole species in genus Fenghwaia.
