= Crumenaria =

Scientific classification
- Kingdom: Plantae
- Clade: Tracheophytes
- Clade: Angiosperms
- Clade: Eudicots
- Clade: Rosids
- Order: Rosales
- Family: Rhamnaceae
- Genus: Crumenaria; Mart.

Genus of flowering plants

Crumenaria is a genus of flowering plants belonging to the family Rhamnaceae.

Its native range is Central America to Argentina.

Species:

- Crumenaria decumbens Mart.
- Crumenaria erecta Reissek
- Crumenaria glaziovii Urb.
- Crumenaria lilloi Suess.
