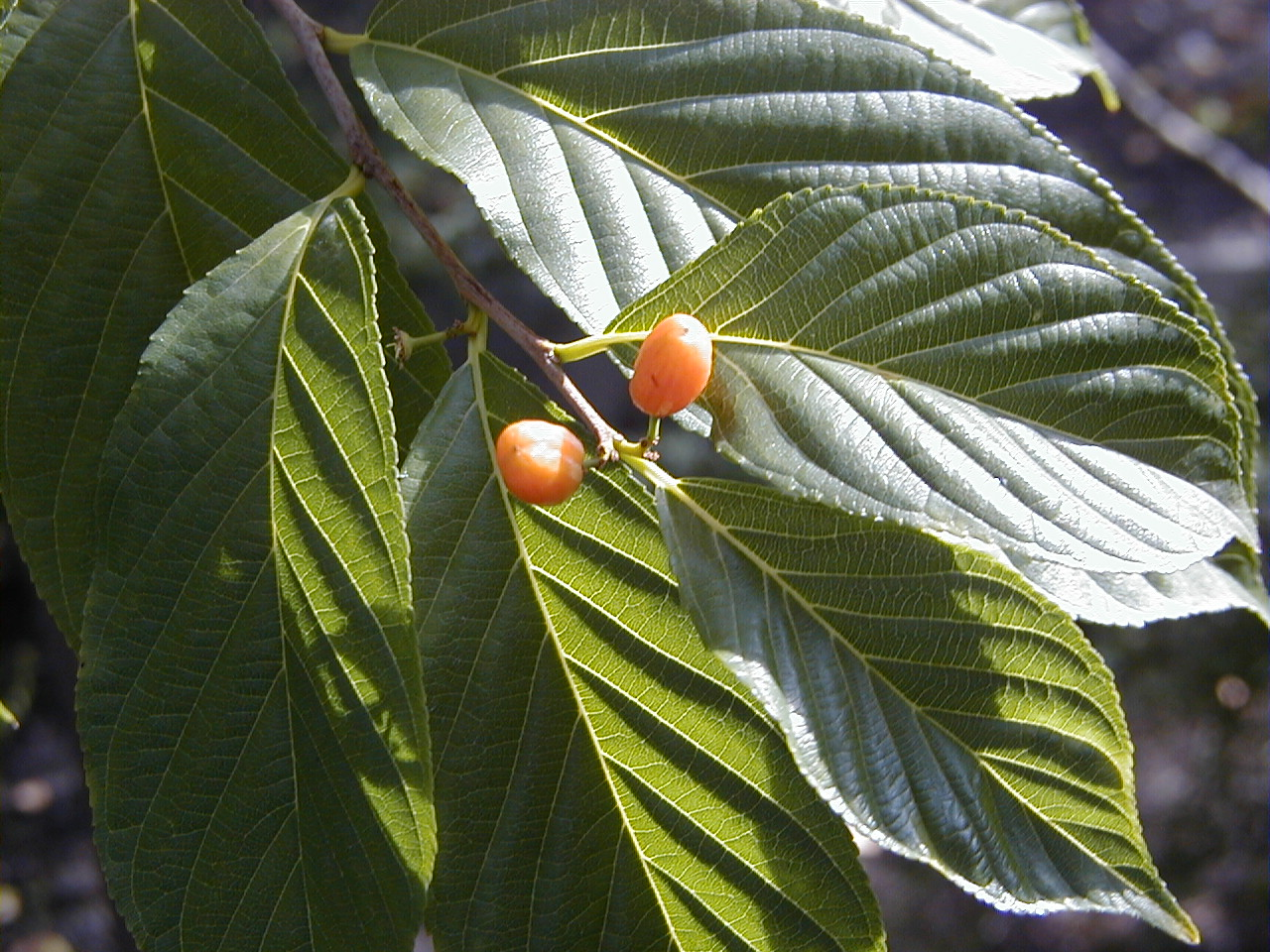
- Rhamnela franguloides

Scientific classification
- Kingdom: Plantae
- Clade: Tracheophytes
- Clade: Angiosperms
- Clade: Eudicots
- Clade: Rosids
- Order: Rosales
- Family: Rhamnaceae
- Tribe: Rhamneae
- Genus: Rhamnella; Miq.

Synonyms
- Chaydaia Pit.; Dallachya F.Muell.

= Rhamnella =

Genus of plants

Rhamnella is a genus of plants in the family Rhamnaceae, distributed throughout parts of Asia and the Pacific.

== Description ==
Plants in this genus are deciduous or evergreen shrubs, small trees or lianas. Leaves are alternate, petiolate and stipulate, with fine teeth on the margins. The inflorescences are cymes or fascicles produced in the leaf axils. The flowers have 5 petals and sepals, are yellow-green, bisexual (i.e. having both male and female parts) and pedicelate. The calyx tube is cup-shaped, lobes triangular. The petals are incurved, more or less wrapped around the stamens. Ovary is superior, carpels one or two. Fruit are drupes, yellow-orange at first, turning purple or black, seeds one or two.

== Distribution ==
Most species are found from the Himalayas through China and Vietnam to Japan and Korea. One species (R. vitiensis) is native to New Guinea, Queensland (Australia), and the southwestern Pacific.

== Species ==
As of December 2024, Plants of the World Online accepts the following 12 species:

- Rhamnella brachycarpa Z.Qiang Lu & Y.Shuai Sun
- Rhamnella caudata Merr.
- Rhamnella forrestii W.W.Sm.
- Rhamnella franguloides (Maxim.) Weberb.
- Rhamnella gilgitica Mansf. & Melch.
- Rhamnella intermedia Z.Qiang Lu & Y.Shuai Sun
- Rhamnella julianae C.K.Schneid.
- Rhamnella martini (H.Lév.) C.K.Schneid.
- Rhamnella rubrinervis (H.Lév.) Rehder
- Rhamnella tonkinensis (Pit.) T.Yamaz.
- Rhamnella vitiensis (Benth.) A.C.Sm.
- Rhamnella wilsonii C.K.Schneid.
