= Berchemiella =

Scientific classification
- Kingdom: Plantae
- Clade: Tracheophytes
- Clade: Angiosperms
- Clade: Eudicots
- Clade: Rosids
- Order: Rosales
- Family: Rhamnaceae
- Tribe: Rhamneae
- Genus: Berchemiella; Nakai

Species
- Berchemiella berchemiaefolia; Berchemiella wilsonii

Genus of flowering plants

Berchemiella is a genus of plants in the family Rhamnaceae. It includes two species, one found in China and another in Japan.
