= Blackallia =

Scientific classification
- Kingdom: Plantae
- Clade: Tracheophytes
- Clade: Angiosperms
- Clade: Eudicots
- Clade: Rosids
- Order: Rosales
- Family: Rhamnaceae
- Genus: Blackallia; C.A.Gardner

Genus of flowering plants

Blackallia is a genus of flowering plants belonging to the family Rhamnaceae.

Its native range is Western Australia.

Species:

- Blackallia nudiflora (F.Muell.) Rye & Kellermann
