= Serichonus =

Scientific classification
- Kingdom: Plantae
- Clade: Tracheophytes
- Clade: Angiosperms
- Clade: Eudicots
- Clade: Rosids
- Order: Rosales
- Family: Rhamnaceae
- Genus: Serichonus; K.R.Thiele
- Species: S. gracilipes

Binomial name
- Serichonus gracilipes (Diels) K.R.Thiele

Genus of plants

Serichonus is a monotypic genus of flowering plants belonging to the family Rhamnaceae. The only species is Serichonus gracilipes.
