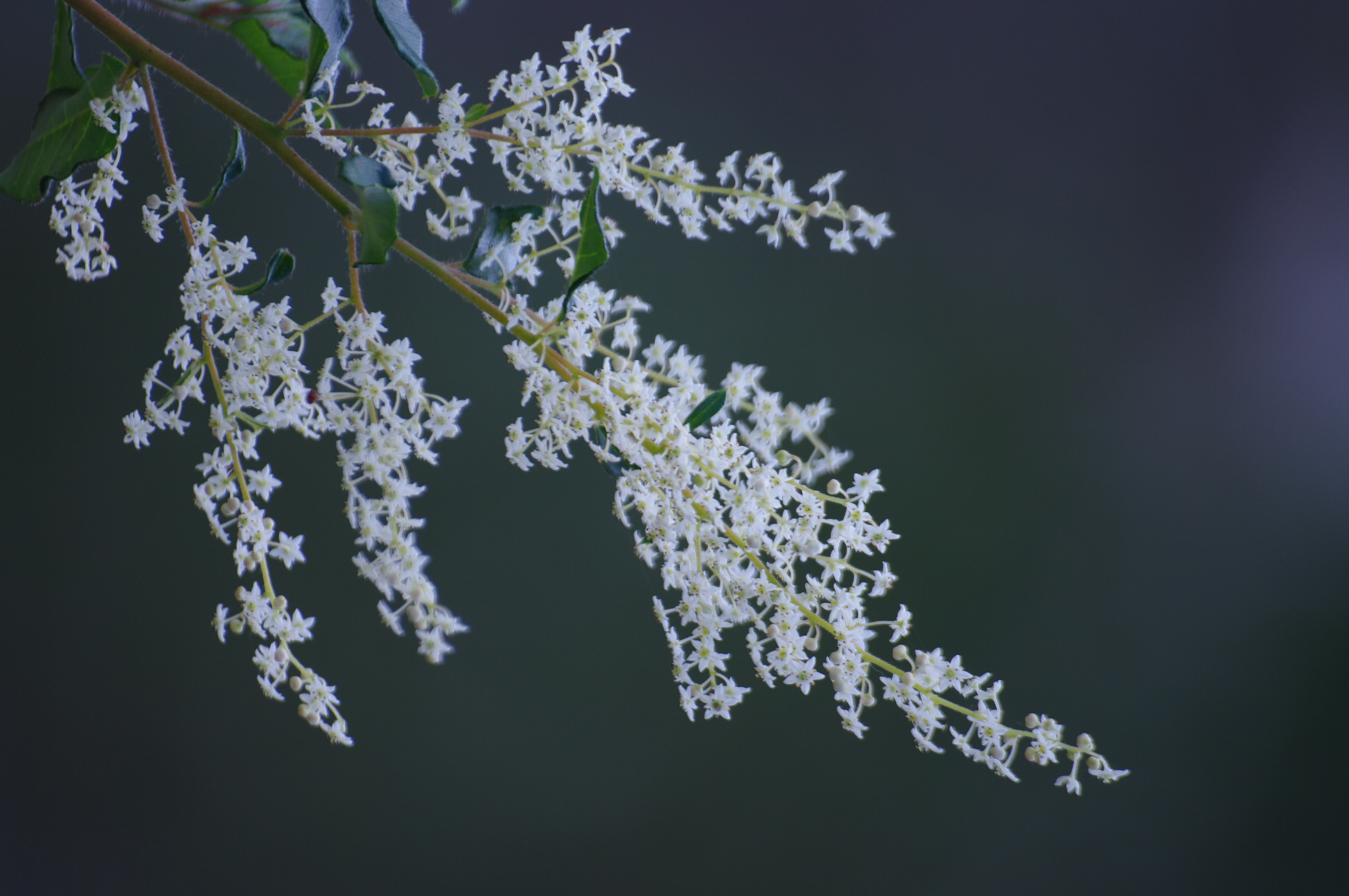
- Trymalium odoratissimum

Scientific classification
- Kingdom: Plantae
- Clade: Tracheophytes
- Clade: Angiosperms
- Clade: Eudicots
- Clade: Rosids
- Order: Rosales
- Family: Rhamnaceae
- Tribe: Pomaderreae
- Genus: Trymalium; Fenzl

Species
- See text

= Trymalium =

Genus of flowering plants

Trymalium is a genus of shrubs or trees in the family Rhamnaceae. The species are endemic to Western Australia but for one, Trymalium wayi, that occurs in South Australia. They are found in forest and semiarid woodland and shrubland of the kwongan in southwest Australia, and the outlying species of South Australia is found on rocky slopes, notably at the Mount Lofty and Flinders Ranges.

Species include:

- Trymalium albicans Reisseck, endemic to Western Australia
- Trymalium angustifolium Reisseck, endemic to Western Australia
- Trymalium daphnifolium Reisseck, endemic to Western Australia
- Trymalium densiflorum Rye, endemic to Western Australia
- Trymalium elachophyllum Rye, endemic to Western Australia
- Trymalium ledifolium Fenzl., endemic to Western Australia
- Trymalium litorale (Diels) Domin, endemic to Western Australia
- Trymalium monospermum Rye, endemic to Western Australia
- Trymalium myrtillus S.Moore, endemic to Western Australia
- Trymalium odoratissimum Lindl., endemic to Western Australia
- Trymalium spatulatum (Labill.) Ostenf., endemic to Western Australia
- Trymalium urceolare (F.Muell.) Diels, endemic to Western Australia
- Trymalium venustum Rye, endemic to Western Australia
- Trymalium wayi F.Muell. & Tate, endemic to South Australia

Species names that are no longer current include:

- Trymalium daltonii F.Muell. - currently Spyridium daltonii (F.Muell.) J.Kellerm.
- Trymalium floribundum Steud. - currently Trymalium odoratissimum Lindl. subsp. odoratissimum
- Trymalium ramosissimum Audas - currently Spyridium × ramosissimum (Audas) J.Kellerm.
