= Oreorhamnus =

Conservation status
- Least Concern (IUCN 3.1)

Scientific classification
- Kingdom: Plantae
- Clade: Tracheophytes
- Clade: Angiosperms
- Clade: Eudicots
- Clade: Rosids
- Order: Rosales
- Family: Rhamnaceae
- Genus: Oreorhamnus; Ridl. (2020)
- Species: O. serrulata

Binomial name
- Oreorhamnus serrulata Ridl. (1920)

Synonyms
- Frangula borneensis (Steenis) Hauenschild (2016); Oreorhamnus serrulatus Ridl. (1920), orth. var.; Rhamnus borneensis Steenis (1934)

Genus of flowering plants

Oreorhamnus serrulata is a species of flowering plant in the buckthorn family, Rhamnaceae. It is native to Borneo and Sumatra. It is the sole species in genus Oreorhamnus.
