= Condaliopsis =

Scientific classification
- Kingdom: Plantae
- Clade: Tracheophytes
- Clade: Angiosperms
- Clade: Eudicots
- Clade: Rosids
- Order: Rosales
- Family: Rhamnaceae
- Tribe: Paliureae
- Genus: Condaliopsis (Weberb.) Suess.

Species
- 7; see text

Genus of flowering plants

Condaliopsis is a genus of flowering plants in the buckthorn family, Rhamnaceae. It includes seven species of shrubs native to central and northern Mexico and the southwestern and south-central United States.

== Species ==
Seven species are accepted.

- Condaliopsis australis G.L.Nesom
- Condaliopsis chihuahuana G.L.Nesom
- Condaliopsis divaricata (A.Nelson) G.L.Nesom
- Condaliopsis lloydii (Standl.) Suess.
- Condaliopsis obtusifolia (Hook. ex Torr. & A.Gray) Suess.
- Condaliopsis rigida (Wiggins) Wiggins
- Condaliopsis supralloydii G.L.Nesom
