= Conalma =

Scientific classification
- Kingdom: Plantae
- Clade: Tracheophytes
- Clade: Angiosperms
- Clade: Eudicots
- Clade: Rosids
- Order: Rosales
- Family: Rhamnaceae
- Genus: Conalma; G.L.Nesom (2023)

Species
- Conalma mexicana (Rose) G.L.Nesom; Conalma pedunculata (Brandegee) G.L.Nesom; Conalma yucatanensis (Standl.) G.L.Nesom

Genus of flowering plants

Conalma is a genus of flowering plants in the buckthorn family, Rhamnaceae. It includes three species of trees endemic to Mexico.

- Conalma mexicana (Rose) G.L.Nesom
- Conalma pedunculata (Brandegee) G.L.Nesom
- Conalma yucatanensis (Standl.) G.L.Nesom
