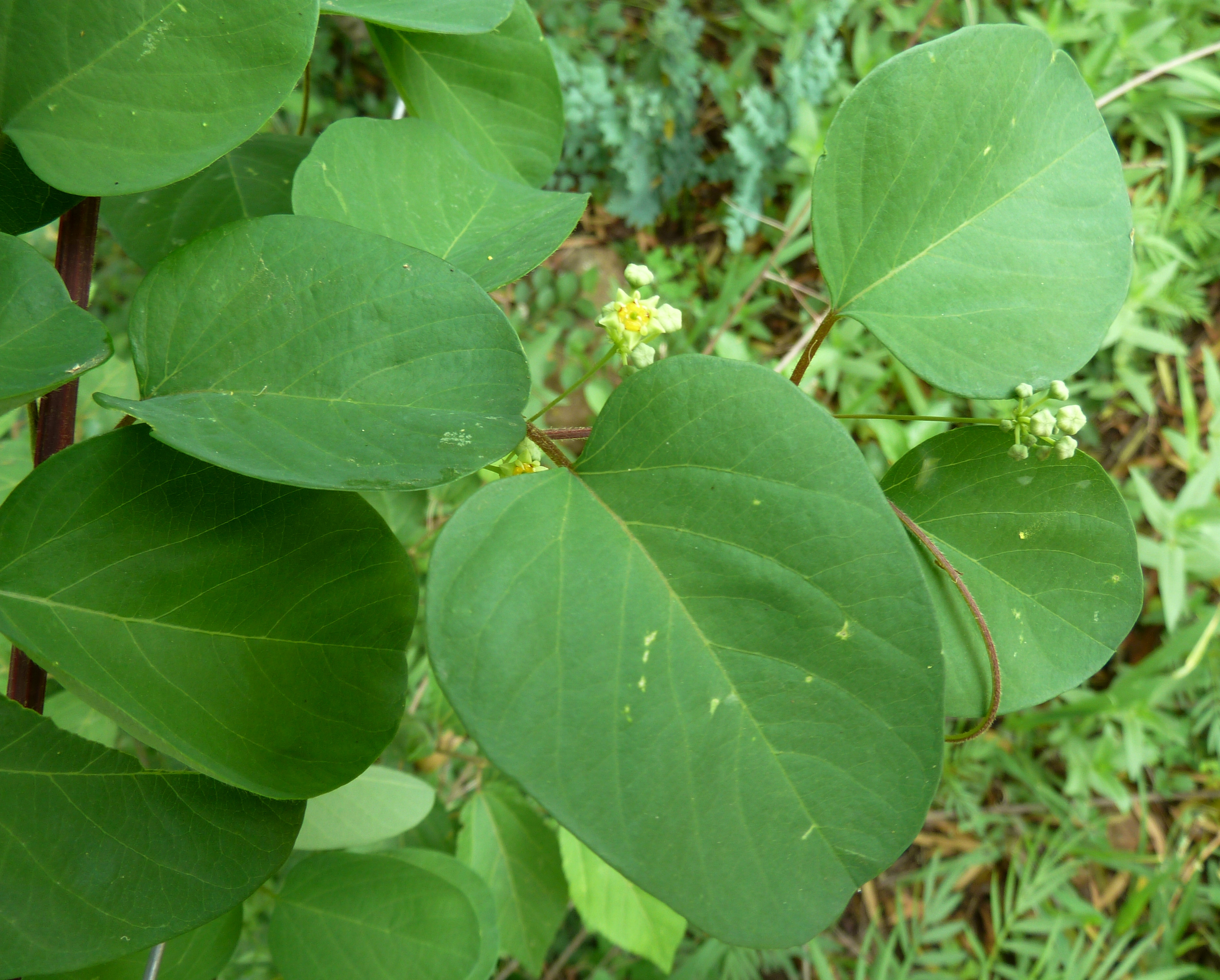
- Helinus integrifolius

Scientific classification
- Kingdom: Plantae
- Clade: Tracheophytes
- Clade: Angiosperms
- Clade: Eudicots
- Clade: Rosids
- Order: Rosales
- Family: Rhamnaceae
- Tribe: Gouanieae
- Genus: Helinus; E.Mey. ex Endl.

Species
- See text

= Helinus =

Genus of flowering plants

Helinus is a genus of flowering plants in the family Rhamnaceae. They are native to tropical and subtropical regions of Africa and Asia, and may be trees, climbing shrubs or lianas. They are unarmed and the branches have coiled tendrils. The alternate leaves have entire margins, and pinnately arranged venation.

== Species ==
The species include:

- Helinus integrifolius (Lam.) Kuntze – southern Africa
- Helinus lanceolatus Brandis – Pakistan, western Himalayas, India
- Helinus mystacinus (Aiton) E.Mey. ex Steud. – eastern Africa
- Helinus spartioides Schinz ex Engl. – southwestern Africa

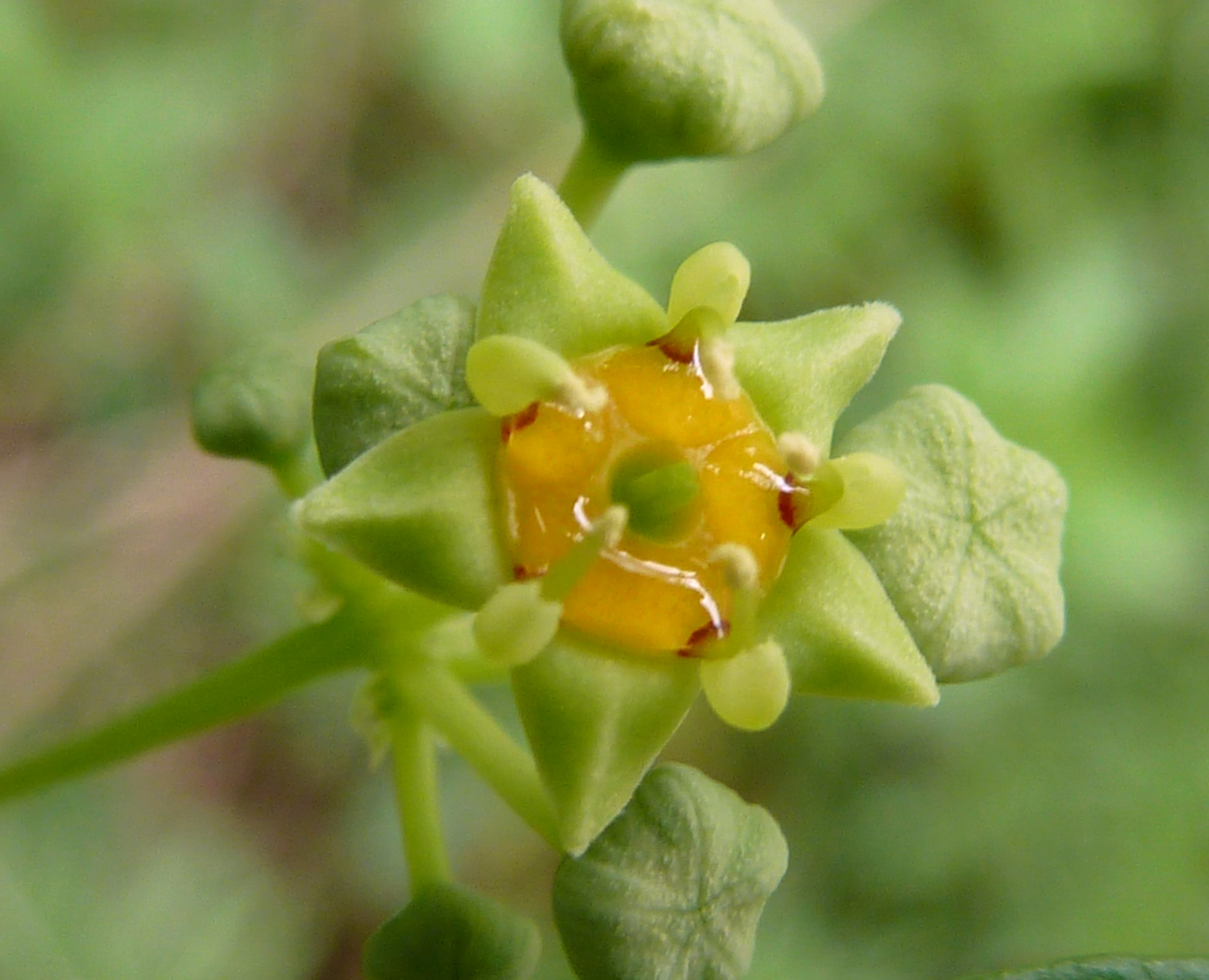
Bisexual flower of H. integrifolius, with 5 sepals and 5 petals, with (yellow) annular nectary disk. The small, clawed petals embrace the stamens.
