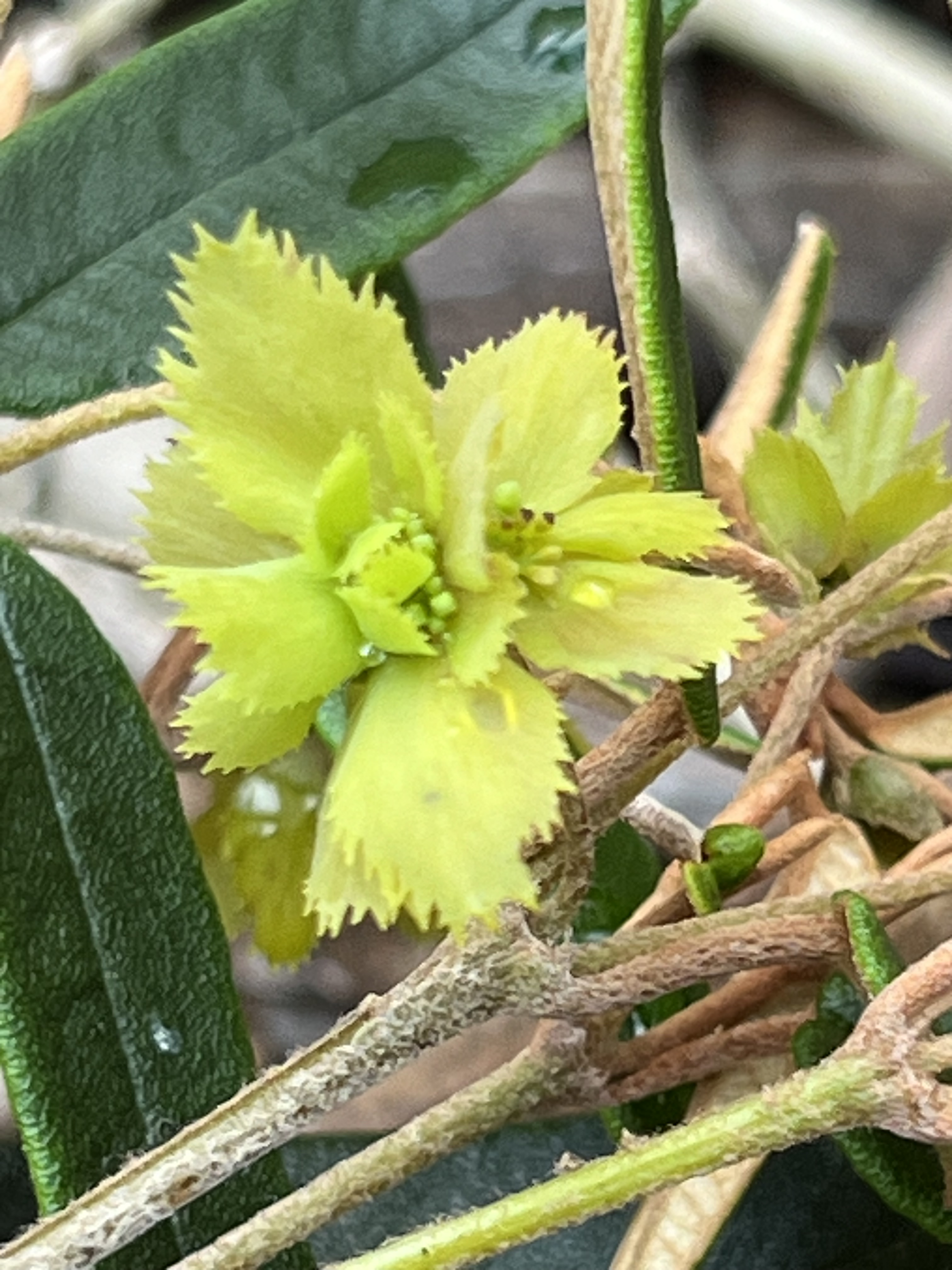

Scientific classification
- Kingdom: Plantae
- Clade: Embryophytes
- Clade: Tracheophytes
- Clade: Angiosperms
- Clade: Eudicots
- Clade: Rosids
- Order: Rosales
- Family: Rhamnaceae
- Genus: Siegfriedia; C.A.Gardner
- Species: S. darwinioides

Binomial name
- Siegfriedia darwinioides C.A.Gardner

= Siegfriedia =

Genus of plants

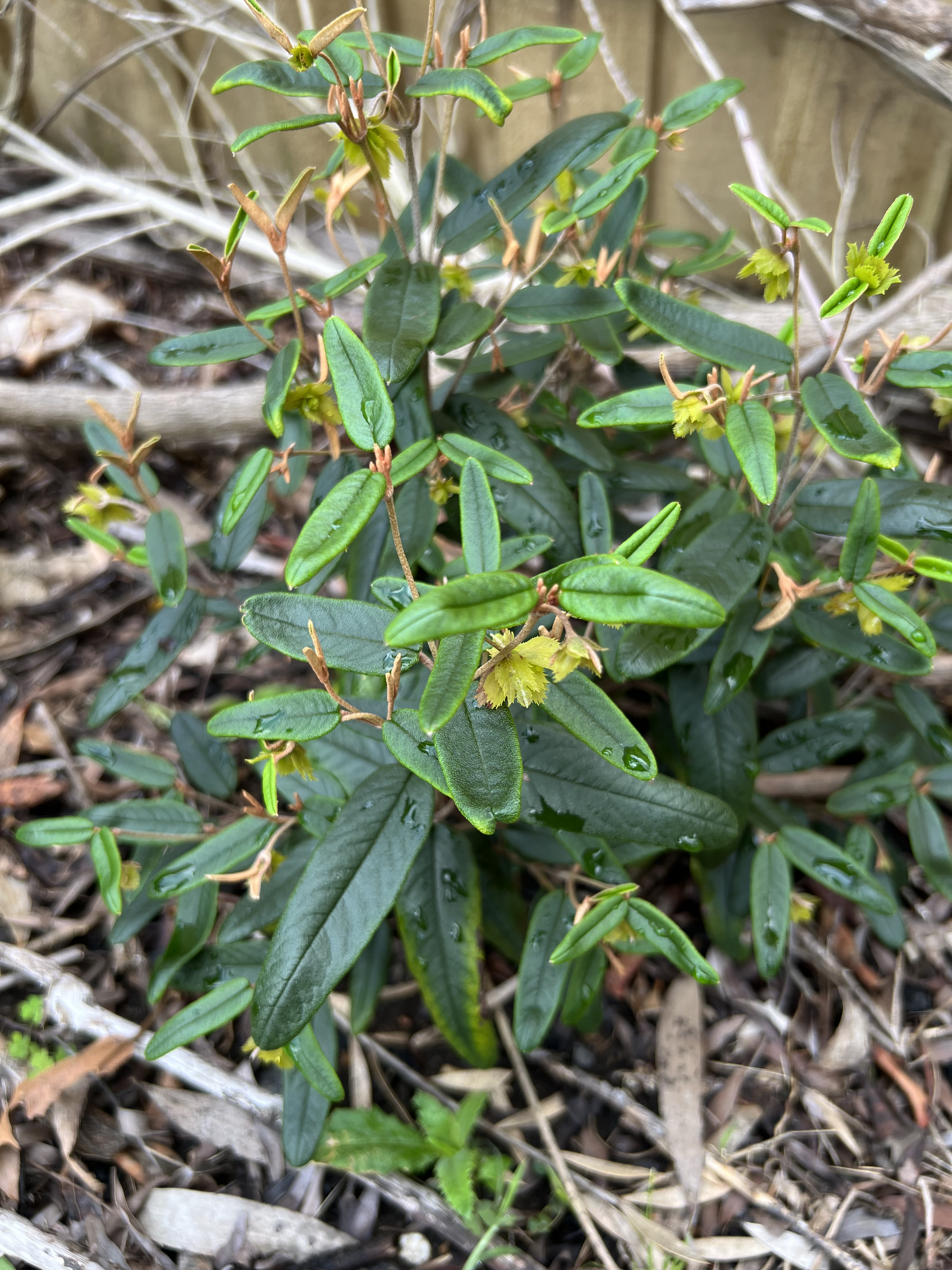
Foliage

Siegfriedia is a monotypic genus flowering plant belonging to the family Rhamnaceae. It is a small plant with smooth leaves and bell-shaped flowers. The only species is Siegfriedia darwinioides, it is endemic to Western Australia.

== Description ==
Siegfriedia darwinioides is a multi-stemmed, upright, spreading shrub 0.2–1 m (7.9 in – 3 ft 3.4 in) high with yellowish-cream to orange pendulous flowers. The branches are smooth, bark purple-brown, smaller branches have a whitish down. The leaves are arranged opposite, oblong-shaped, apex pointed, base almost heart-shaped, margins rolled, upper surface veined and smooth, lower surface densely covered in short matted hairs. Flowering occurs from April to August and the fruit is a schizocarp with three segments.

== Taxonomy and naming ==
Siegfriedia darwinioides was first formally described in 1933 by C.A.Gardner and the description was published in Journal of the Royal Society of Western Australia. The specific epithet (darwinioides) means like Darwinia.

== Distribution and habitat ==
Siegfriedia darwinioides grows from the Stirling Ranges to Esperance on sandy, clay or loam soils.
