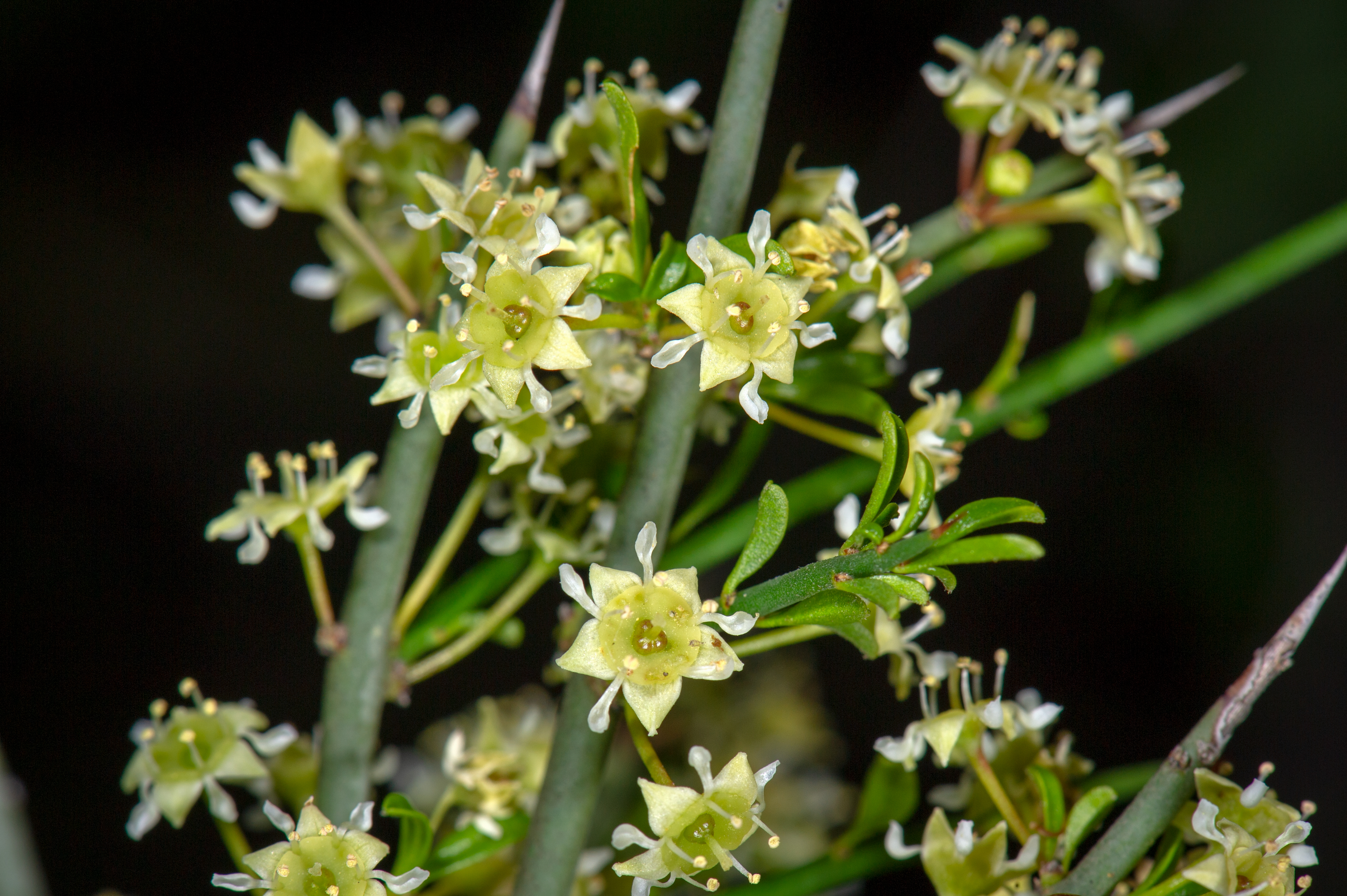
- Adolphia californica

Scientific classification
- Kingdom: Plantae
- Clade: Tracheophytes
- Clade: Angiosperms
- Clade: Eudicots
- Clade: Rosids
- Order: Rosales
- Family: Rhamnaceae
- Tribe: Colletieae
- Genus: Adolphia; Meisn.

Species
- 2 - see text

= Adolphia =

Genus of flowering plants

Adolphia is a genus of shrubs in the buckthorn family containing only two species.

These are rigid, thorny, flowering bushes. Adolphia californica S.Watson, the California prickbush or California spineshrub, are native to southern California and northern Mexico. Adolphia infesta (Kunth) Meisn., the junco, is found in Arizona, Texas, New Mexico, and northern Mexico.

This genus is named for the French botanist Adolphe-Théodore Brongniart (1801–1876). It was first described and published in Pl. Vasc. Gen. on page 70 in 1837.
