= Alvimiantha =

Scientific classification
- Kingdom: Plantae
- Clade: Tracheophytes
- Clade: Angiosperms
- Clade: Eudicots
- Clade: Rosids
- Order: Rosales
- Family: Rhamnaceae
- Genus: Alvimiantha; Grey-Wilson

Genus of flowering plants

Alvimiantha is a genus of flowering plants belonging to the family Rhamnaceae.

Its native range is Brazil.

Species:

- Alvimiantha tricamerata Grey-Wilson
