= Granitites =

Scientific classification
- Kingdom: Plantae
- Clade: Tracheophytes
- Clade: Angiosperms
- Clade: Eudicots
- Clade: Rosids
- Order: Rosales
- Family: Rhamnaceae
- Genus: Granitites; Rye
- Species: G. intangendus

Binomial name
- Granitites intangendus (F.Muell.) Rye

Synonyms
- Pomaderris intangenda F.Muell.

Genus of flowering plants

Granitites intangendus is a species of flowering plant endemic to Western Australia. It is found on granite outcrops in semi-arid regions of the midwest and south.

The only member of the genus Granitites, a name derived from its habitat, it is placed within the family Rhamnaceae. It bears many similarities to the genus Alphitonia (Ash or Sarsparilla trees), which are found in distant tropical regions of Australia, suggesting that it is an ancient species that became relics by climate changes. Its lineage would therefore extend to an era, some 20 mya, when tropical species covered the southern part of the continent.

The habit of this shrub is low-lying and sprawling, at 0.1 metres tall, or erect to a height of 2 metres. It has spiky branchlets, small leaves in an alternate arrangement, and small flowers that are clustered on relatively long stalks. The leaves are entire, or with a toothed margin, are linear in outline or broader at the base, may have hairs, veins that branch from the central axis, and are rolled upon themselves in a revolute manner. The flowers are generally white, the calyx and corolla might also be this colour or pinkish. Its fruit is a schizocarp, dry carpels that divide when mature into single seed bearing capsules. It is found in sandy soils on granite outcrops east of Kalgoorlie, the Avon Wheatbelt and Mallee regions in the southern and eastern parts of the state. Specimens have been recorded at The Humps near Hyden.

The first description of the genus was made by Barbara Rye in Nuytsia in 1996. The author refers to the specimens collected at Fraser's Range and Esperance Bay 120 years beforehand, which was described as a species of Pomaderris by Ferdinand von Mueller.
