= Araracuara (plant) =

Scientific classification
- Kingdom: Plantae
- Clade: Tracheophytes
- Clade: Angiosperms
- Clade: Eudicots
- Clade: Rosids
- Order: Rosales
- Family: Rhamnaceae
- Genus: Araracuara; Fern.Alonso

Genus of flowering plants

Araracuara is a genus of flowering plants belonging to the family Rhamnaceae.

Its native range is Colombia.

Species:

- Araracuara vetusta Fern.Alonso
