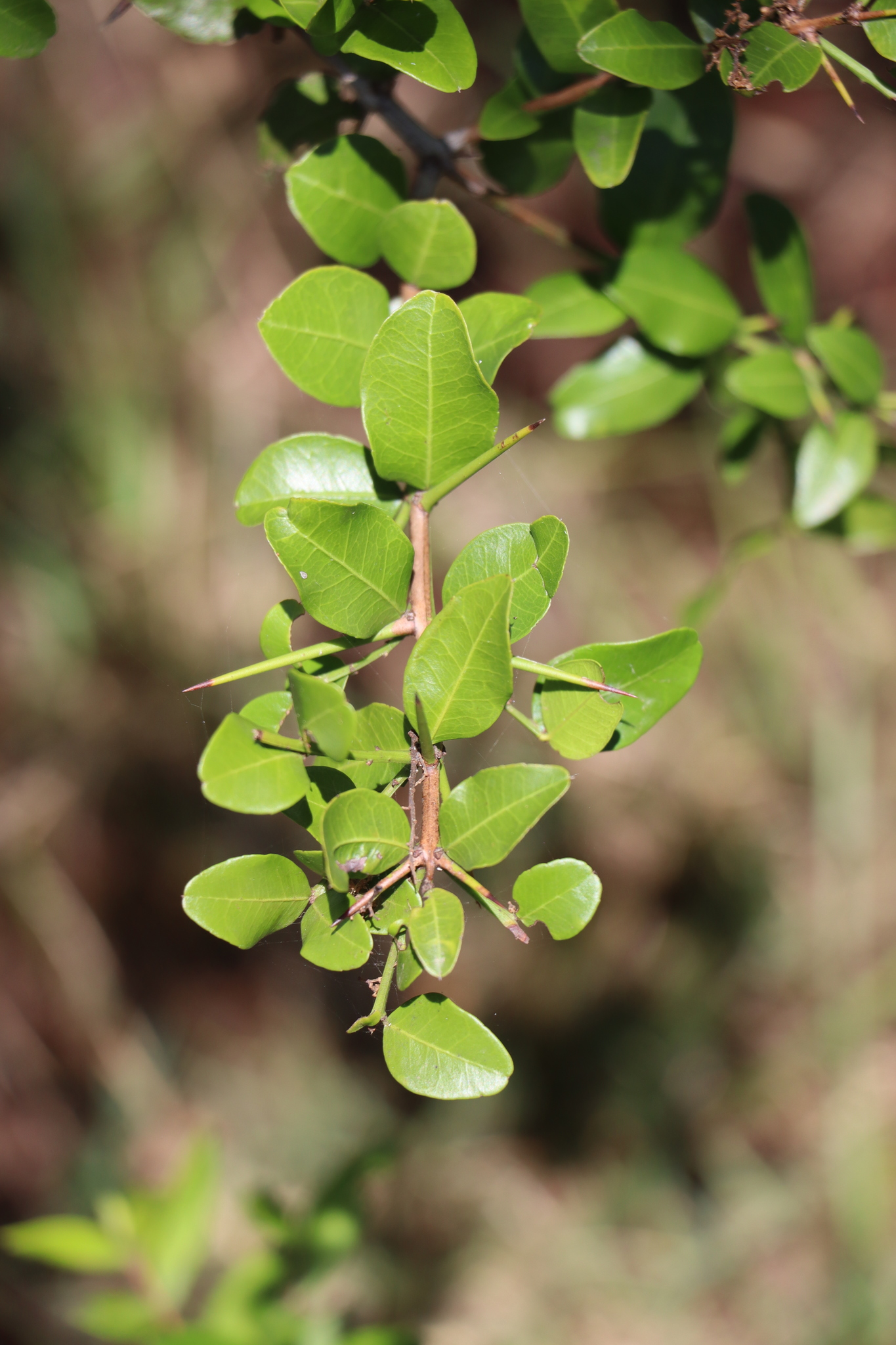
- Scutia buxifolia

Scientific classification
- Kingdom: Plantae
- Clade: Embryophytes
- Clade: Tracheophytes
- Clade: Angiosperms
- Clade: Eudicots
- Clade: Rosids
- Order: Rosales
- Family: Rhamnaceae
- Tribe: Rhamneae
- Genus: Scutia (Comm. ex DC.) Brongn.

Species
- See text

Synonyms
- Adolia Lam.; Blepetalon Raf.; Scypharia Miers

= Scutia =

Genus of flowering plants

Scutia is a genus of flowering plants in the family Rhamnaceae, native to the Galápagos, South America, Africa, Madagascar, the Mascarene Islands, the Indian subcontinent, Sri Lanka, southern China and Southeast Asia. They are shrubs or small trees.

== Species ==
Currently accepted species include:

- Scutia arenicola (Casar.) Reissek
- Scutia buxifolia Reissek
- Scutia colombiana M.C.Johnst.
- Scutia myrtina (Burm.f.) Kurz
- Scutia spicata (Humb. & Bonpl. ex Schult.) Weberb.
