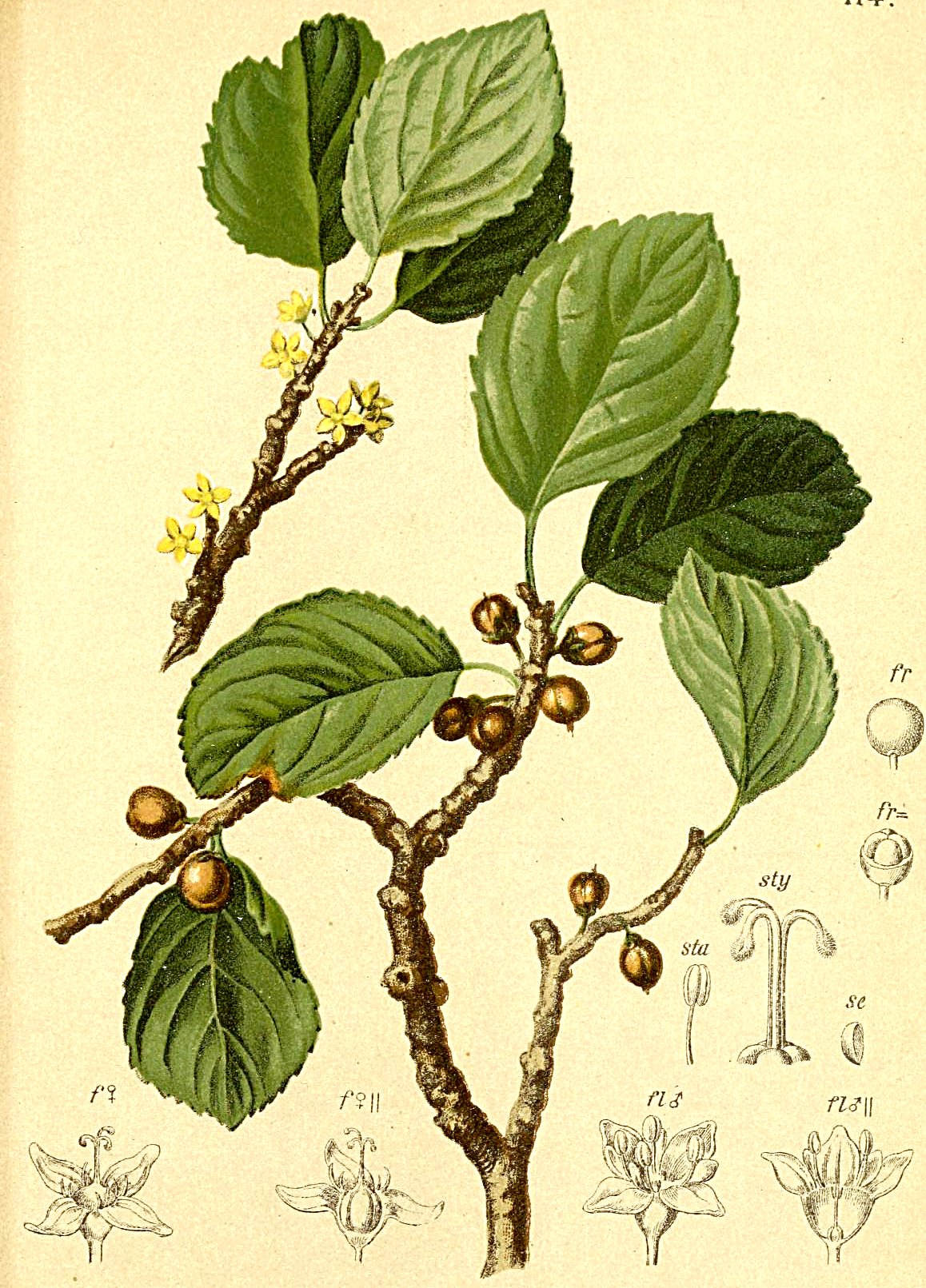
- Rhamnus pumila Turra

Scientific classification
- Kingdom: Plantae
- Clade: Tracheophytes
- Clade: Angiosperms
- Clade: Eudicots
- Clade: Rosids
- Order: Rosales
- Family: Rhamnaceae; Juss.

Type genus
- Rhamnus L.

Genera
- See text
- The range of Rhamnaceae.

Synonyms
- Frangulaceae DC. Phylicaceae J.Agardh; Ziziphaceae Adans. ex Post & Kuntze

= Rhamnaceae =

Rhamnaceae Temporal range: Late Cretaceous–Recent

Family of flowering plants

The Rhamnaceae are a large family of flowering plants, mostly trees, shrubs, and some vines, commonly called the buckthorn family. Rhamnaceae is included in the order Rosales.

The family contains about 55 genera and 950 species. The Rhamnaceae have a worldwide distribution, but are more common in the subtropical and tropical regions. The earliest fossil evidence of Rhamnaceae is from the Late Cretaceous. Fossil flowers have been collected from the Upper Cretaceous of Mexico and the Paleocene of Argentina.

== Description ==
Leaves of family Rhamnaceae members are simple, i.e., the leaf blades are not divided into smaller leaflets. Leaves can be either alternate or opposite. Stipules are present and modified into spines in many genera. In some (e.g. Paliurus spina-christi and Colletia paradoxa) spectacularly so. Colletia stands out by having two axillary buds instead of one, one developing into a thorn, the other one into a shoot.

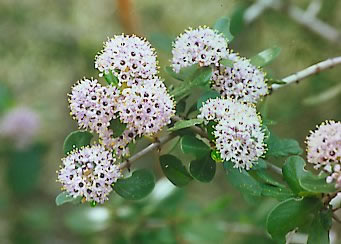
Flowers of Ceanothus cuneatus

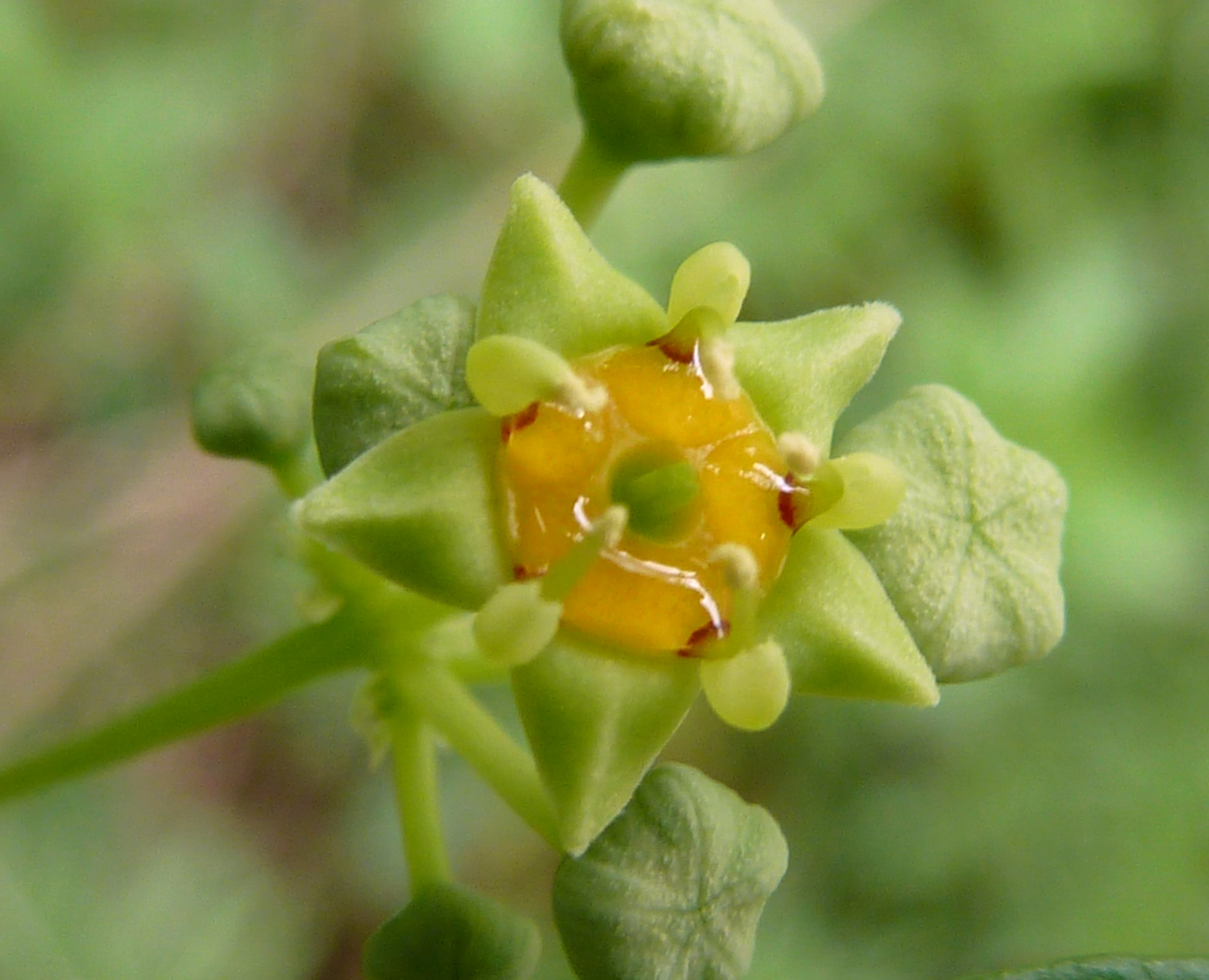
Bisexual flower of Helinus, with five sepals and petals, and a yellow, annular nectary disk. The small, clawed petals embrace the stamens.

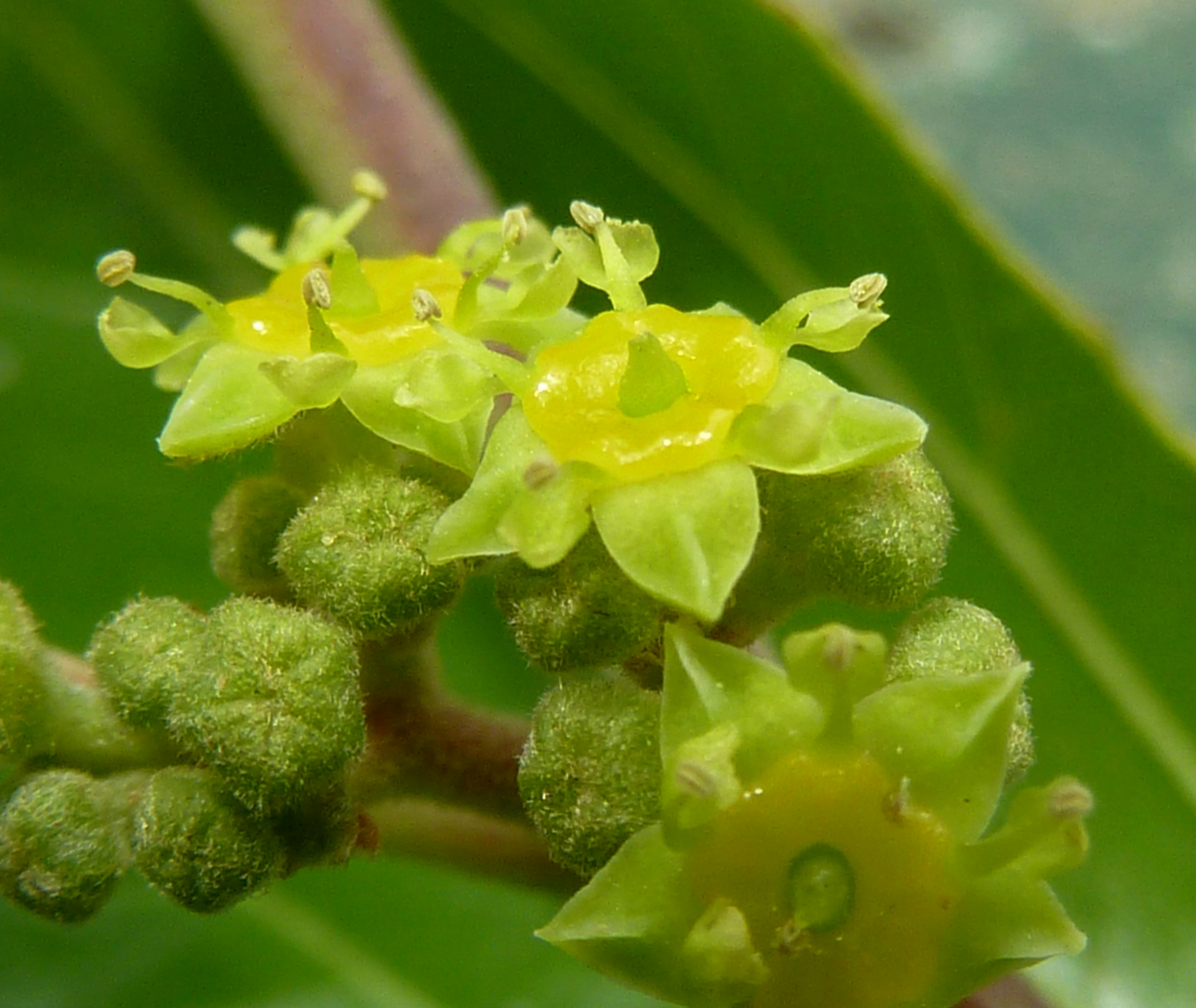
Flowers of Ziziphus mucronata

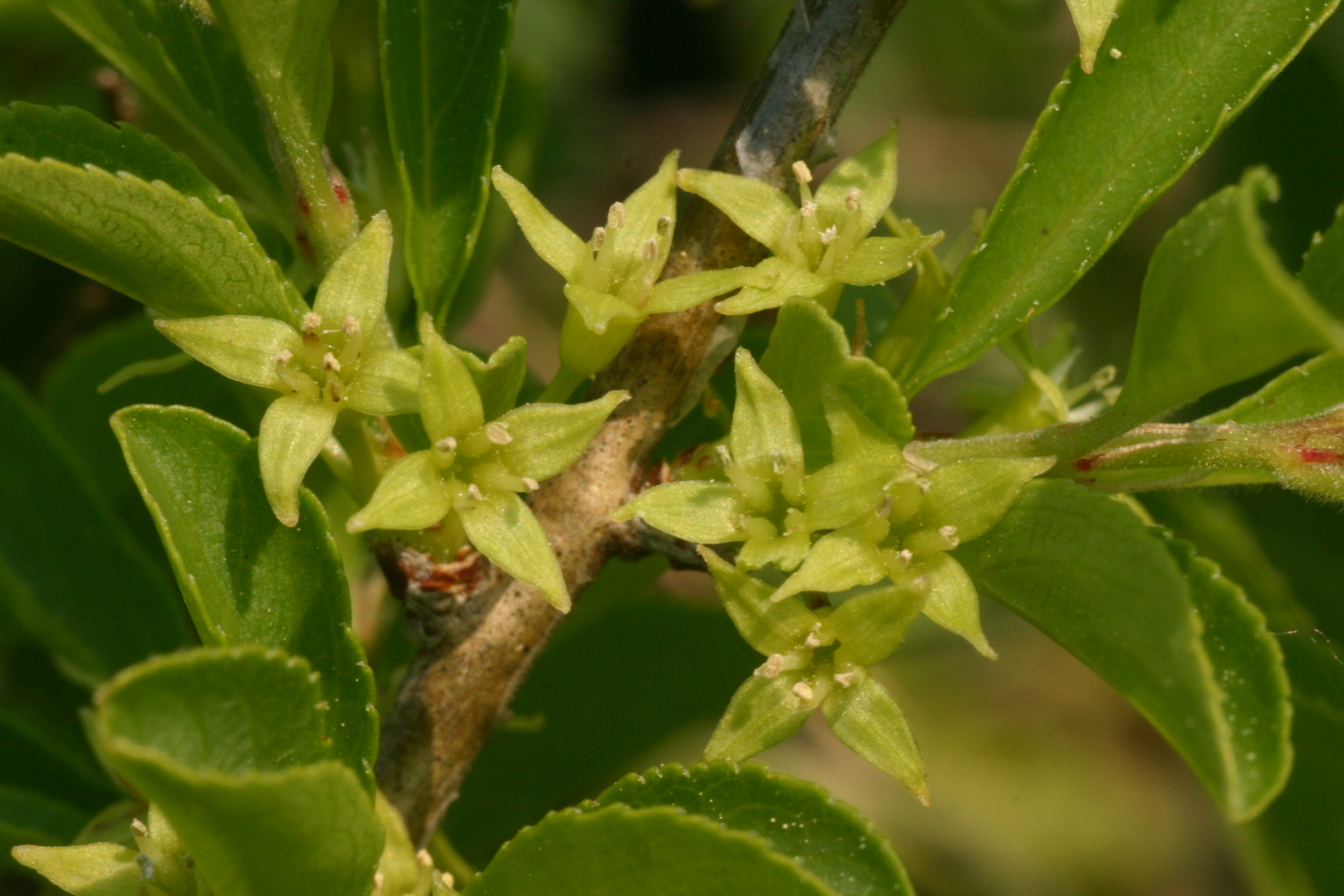
Flowers of Rhamnus saxatilis

The flowers are radially symmetrical. There are five (sometimes four) separate sepals and five (sometimes four or none) separate petals. The petals may be white, yellowish, greenish, pink or blue, and are small and inconspicuous in most genera, though in some (e.g. Ceanothus) the dense clusters of flowers are conspicuous. The five or four stamens are opposite the petals. The ovary is mostly superior, with two or three ovules (or one by abortion).

The fruits are mostly berries, fleshy drupes, or nuts. Some are adapted to wind carriage, but most are dispersed by mammals and birds. Chinese jujube is the fruit of the jujube tree (Ziziphus jujuba) and is a major fruit in China.

The American genus Ceanothus, which has several showy ornamental species, has nitrogen-fixing root nodules.

Economic uses of the Rhamnaceae are chiefly as ornamental plants and as the source of many brilliant green and yellow dyes. The wood of Rhamnus was also the most favoured species to make charcoal for use in gunpowder before the development of modern propellants.

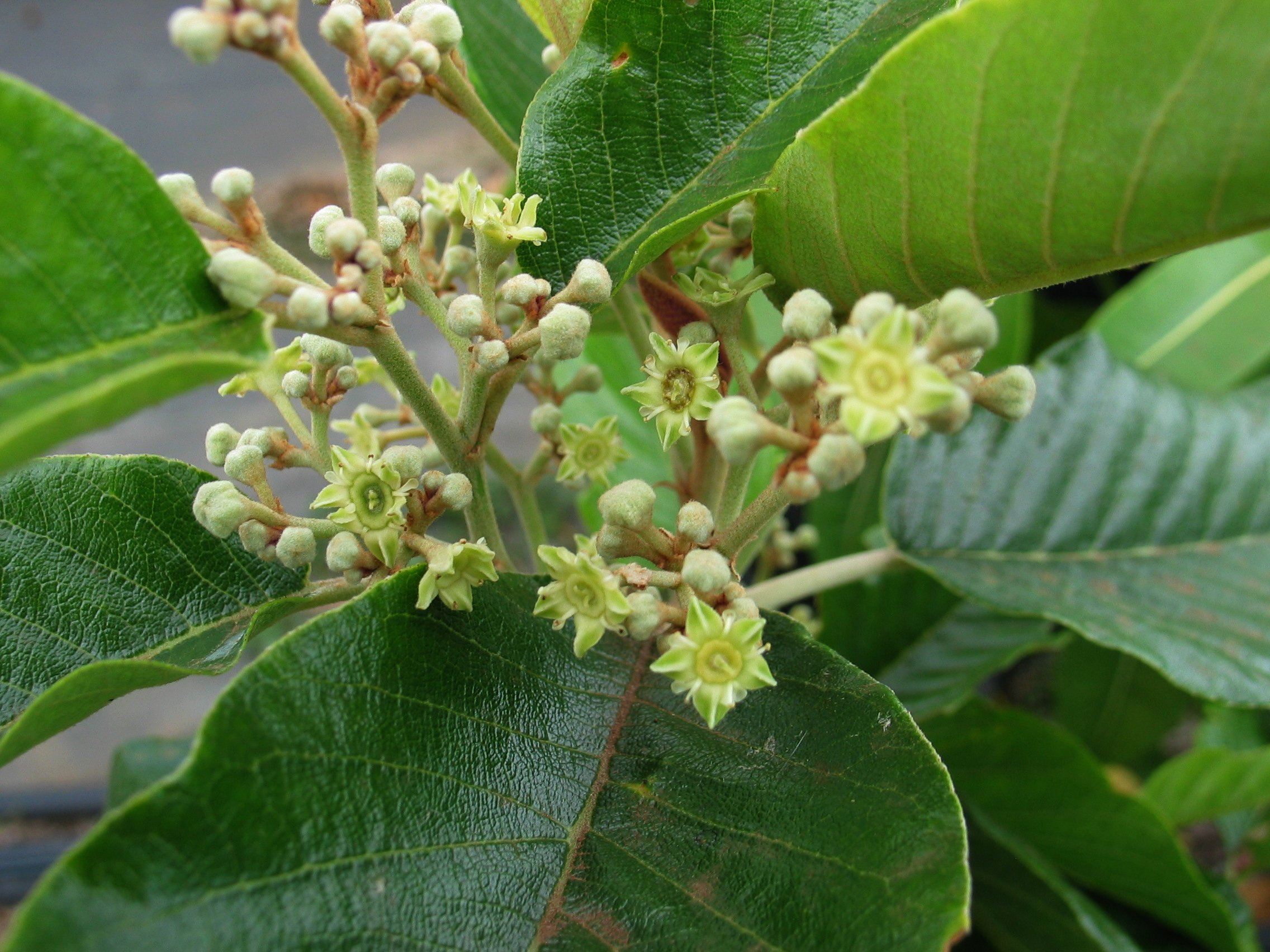
Alphitonia ponderosa

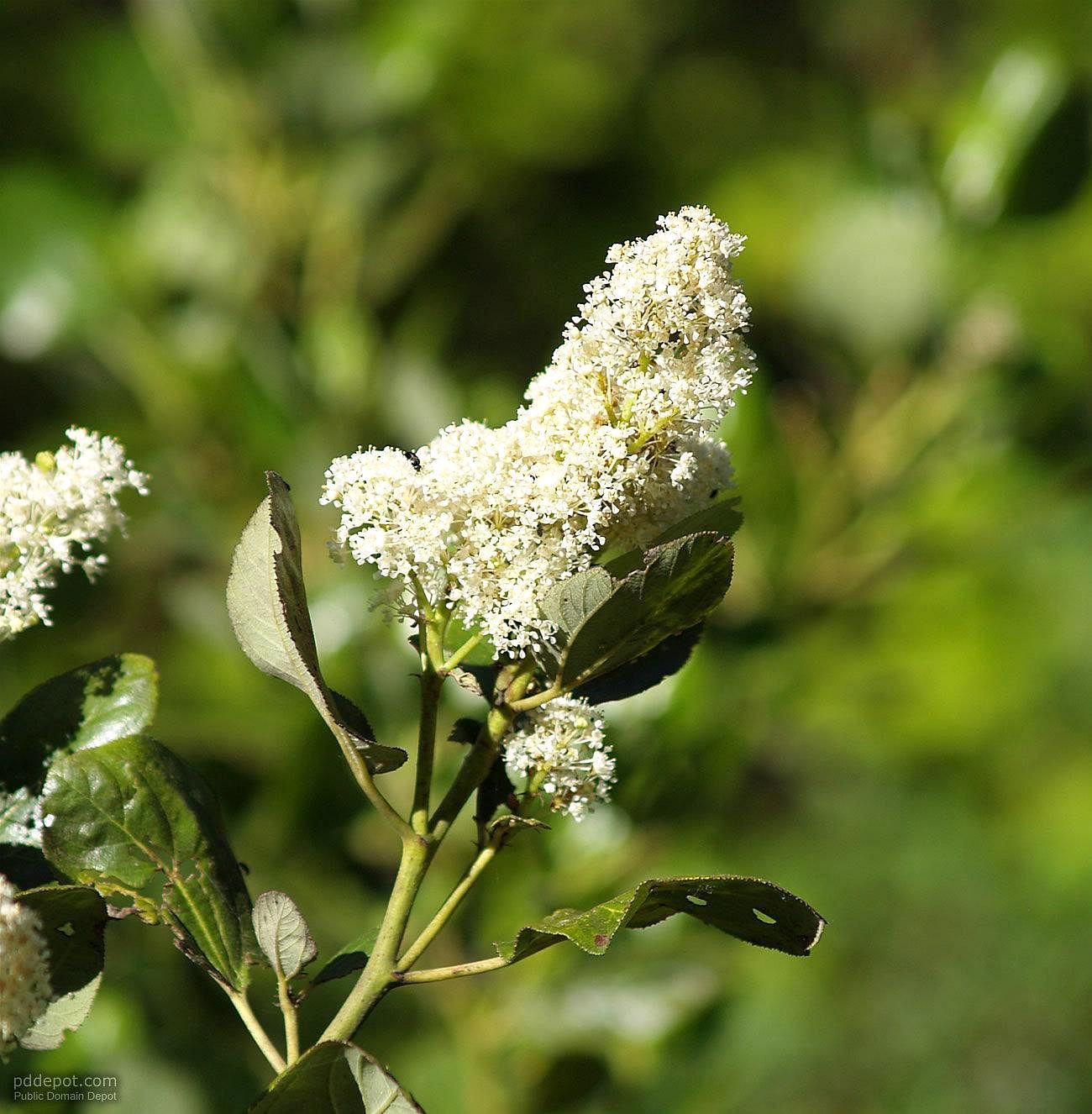
Ceanothus

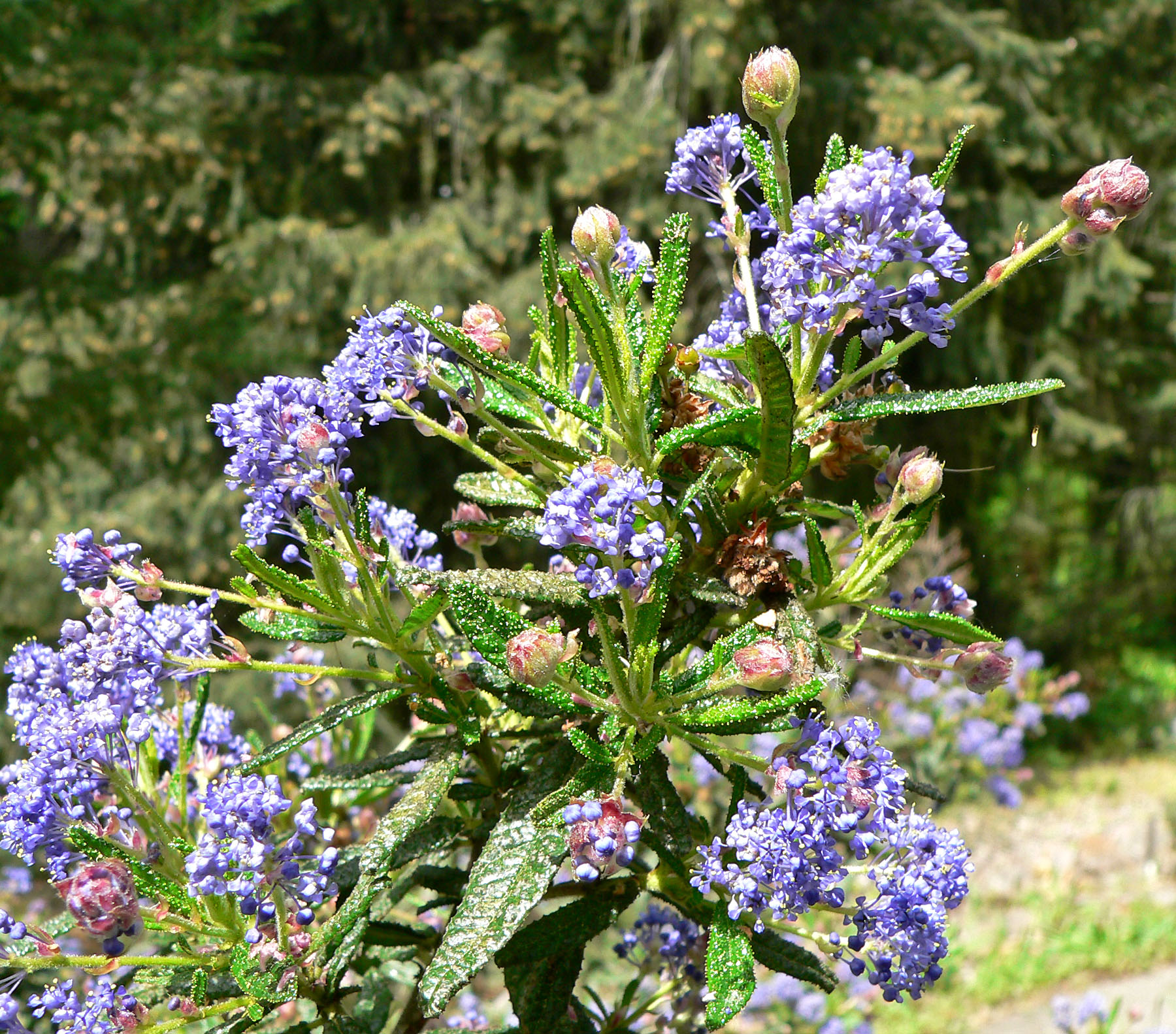
Ceanothus papillosus var. roweanus at the Regional Parks Botanic Garden, Berkeley, California

== Genera ==
- Tribe Ampelozizipheae
  - Ampelozizyphus Ducke
- Tribe Bathiorhamneae
  - Bathiorhamnus Capuron
- Tribe Colletieae
  - Adolphia Meisn.
  - Colletia Comm. ex Juss.
  - Discaria Hook.
  - Kentrothamnus Suess. & Overkott
  - Ochetophila Poepp. ex Reissek
  - Retanilla (DC.) Brongn.
  - Trevoa Miers ex Hook.
- Tribe Doerpfeldieae
  - Doerpfeldia Urb.
- Tribe Gouanieae
  - Alvimiantha Grey-Wilson
  - Crumenaria Mart.
  - Gouania Jacq.
  - Helinus E.Mey. ex Endl.
  - Johnstonalia Tortosa (originally named Johnstonia; by some treated as Gouania)
  - Pleuranthodes Weberb. – synonym of Gouania
  - Reissekia Endl.
- Tribe Maesopsideae
  - Maesopsis Engl.
- Tribe Paliureae
  - Condaliopsis (Weberb.) Suess.
  - Hovenia Thunb.
  - Paliurus Mill.
  - Ziziphus Mill.
  - Sarcomphalus P.Browne emend. Hauenschild
- Tribe Phyliceae
  - Nesiota† Hook.f. Extinct (2003)
  - Noltea Rchb.
  - Phylica L.
  - Trichocephalus Brogn.
- Tribe Pomaderreae
  - Blackallia C.A.Gardner
  - Cryptandra Sm.
  - Papistylus Kellermann, Rye & K.R.Thiele
  - Polianthion K.R.Thiele
  - Pomaderris Labill.
  - Serichonus K.R.Thiele
  - Siegfriedia C.A.Gardner
  - Spyridium Fenzl
  - Stenanthemum Reissek
  - Trymalium Fenzl
- Tribe Rhamneae
  - Auerodendron Urb.
  - Berchemia Neck. ex DC.
  - Berchemiella Nakai
  - Condalia Cav.
  - Frangula Mill.
  - Karwinskia Zucc.
  - Krugiodendron Urb.
  - Phyllogeiton (Weberb.) Herzog
  - Pseudoziziphus Hauenschild
  - Reynosia Griseb.
  - Rhamnella Miq.
  - Rhamnidium Reissek
  - Rhamnus L.
  - Sageretia Brongn.
  - Scutia (Comm. ex DC.) Brongn.
- Tribe Ventilagineae
  - Smythea Seem.
  - Ventilago Gaertn.
- Incertae sedis
  - Alphitonia Endl. (close to Colubrina)
  - Araracuara Fern.Alonso
  - Ceanothus L. (close to Pomaderreae)
  - Chaydaia Pit. – synonym of Rhamnella
  - Colubrina Rich. ex Brongn.
  - Conalma G.L.Nesom
  - Emmenosperma F.Muell. (close to Colubrina)
  - Fenghwaia G.T.Wang & R.J.Wang
  - Granitites Rye (close to Alphitonia)
  - Hybosperma Urb. – synonym of Colubrina
  - Jaffrea H.C.Hopkins & Pillon
  - Lasiodiscus Hook.f.
  - Oreorhamnus Ridl.
  - Schistocarpaea F.Muell. (maybe belonging to Colletieae)

== Systematics ==
Modern molecular phylogenetics recommend the following clade-based classification of Rhamnaceae:

- - Elaeagnaceae (outgroup)
  - Rhamnaceae
    - - Ampeloziziphoids
        - Ventilago
        - - Bathiorhamnus
          - - Ampelozizyphus
            - Doerpfeldia
      - Rhamnoids
        - Maesopsis
        - - - Scutia
            - - Rhamnus
              - Frangula
          - - Sageretia
            - - Berchemia
              - - - Rhamnidium
                  - Rhamnella
                - - Reynosia
                  - - Krugiodendron
                    - - Karwinskia
                      - Condalia
    - Ziziphoids
      - Schistocarpeia
      - - - - Hovenia
            - - Ziziphus
              - Paliurus
          - - - Gouania
              - Helinus
            - - Pleuranthodes
              - - Crumenaria
                - Reissekia
        - - - Lasiodiscus
            - Colubrina
          - - Emmenosperma
            - - Phyliceae
                - Noltea
                - - Trichocephalus
                  - - Nesiota
                    - Phylica
              - - - Granitites
                  - Alphitonia
                - Colletieae
                  - - Adolphia
                    - Trevoa
                  - - Discaria
                    - Kentrothamnus
                    - Colletia
                    - Retanilla
                - - Ceanothus
                  - Pomaderreae
                    - Siegfriedia
                    - Cryptandra
                    - - Stenanthemum
                      - - Trymalium
                        - - Pomaderris
                          - Spyridium

== Fossil record ==
The fossil record of the family extends back to the Late Cretaceous, with records from Colombia and Mexico. Remains from the mid-Cretaceous Burmese amber of Myanmar have been suggested to belong to this family by some authors, but this has been doubted by others. The earliest fossils of modern genera of the family date to the Eocene.
