= Snakewood =

Snakewood is a common name of several different plants:

- Acacia species (family Fabaceae) in Australia, Acacia eremaea, Acacia intorta, Acacia xiphophylla
- Brosimum guianense (= Piratinera guianensis) (family Moraceae) (Letterwood, Leopardwood) in South America, an exotic hardwood prized for its highly figured grain
- Cecropia species, from North South America to Middle America, Cecropia peltata, Cecropia palmata and others
- Colubrina species (family Rhamnaceae) in North America
- Condalia species (family Rhamnaceae) in North and South America
- Mennegoxylon species, an extinct genus of trees
- Strychnos colubrina, from Myanmar, Sulawesi, New Guinea
- Strychnos minor, a plant in the family Loganiaceae, found from India through southeast Asia to New Guinea and Australia
- Zygia species, such as Zygia racemosa

== See also ==
- Serpentwood
