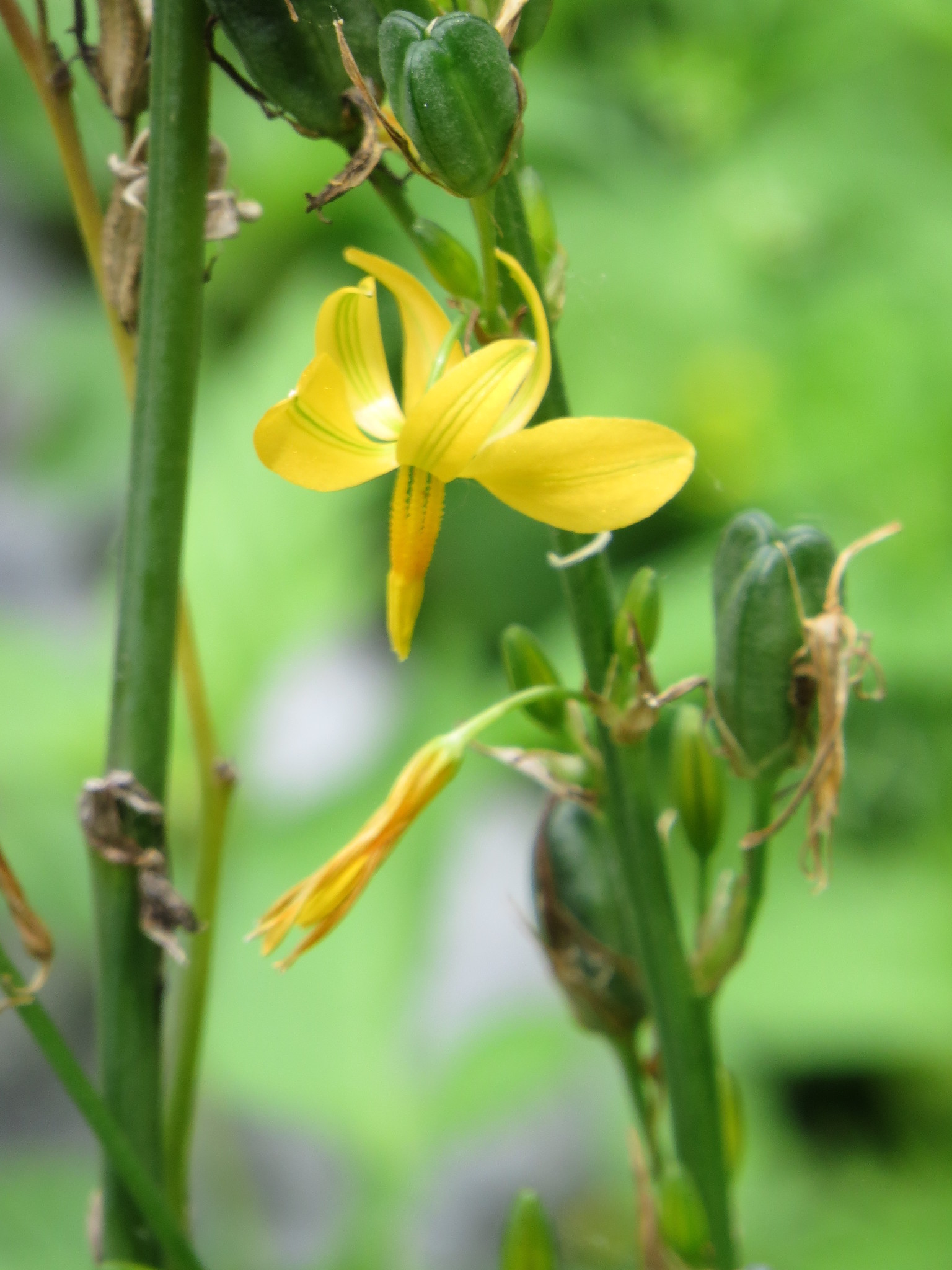

Conservation status
- Critically Imperiled (NatureServe)

Scientific classification
- Kingdom: Plantae
- Clade: Tracheophytes
- Clade: Angiosperms
- Clade: Monocots
- Order: Asparagales
- Family: Asparagaceae
- Subfamily: Agavoideae
- Genus: Echeandia
- Species: E. texensis

Binomial name
- Echeandia texensis Cruden

= Echeandia texensis =

Species of flowering plant

Echeandia texensis, also known as the Green Island echeandia or the Texas craglily, is an endangered species of flowering plant in the asparagus family, Asparagaceae, that is endemic to South Texas in the United States and adjacent Tamaulipas, Mexico. The majority of specimens have been found in Texas, with only one specimen reported from Tamaulipas.

== Taxonomy ==
It was first described in 1999 by Robert William Cruden based on specimens collected near Brownsville, Texas between 1945 and 1951. Specimens that had previously been identified asEcheandia reflexa were distinguished by Cruden as constituting a separate species based primarily on the species' connate anthers and distribution. It is distinguished from the closely related Echeandia chandleri by its having longer and connate, not distinct, anthers and finely denticulate leaf margins.

The scientific name, texensis, means 'Texan' or 'from Texas' and reflects the fact that the species is found almost exclusively in Texas. One of the common names, Green Island echeandia, is taken from the loma island the type specimen was collected on.

== Description ==
Echeandia texensis is an erect perennial herbaceous plant that reaches about 3 ft (0.91 m) in height. It has 4 to 11 long, narrow grass-like basal leaves, growing 33 to 60 cm (13 to 24 in) long with finely toothed edges. There are 2 to 5 cauline leaves, between 10 and 20 cm (3.9 and 7.9 in) long. Nodding, yellow flowers bloom between April and November on a single raceme reaching 51 to 105 cm (20 to 41 in) in height. The fruit is an oblong capsule, 9 to 13 mm (0.35 to 0.51 in) long and 4 to 6 mm (0.16 to 0.24 in) wide.

It dies back after the first hard freeze, emerging again in late spring (May or June) from a corm.

== Distribution and habitat ==
It is found in open areas on mildly saline clay soils of clay dunes, arroyos, llanos, and lomas along the Gulf Coast at or near the mouth of the Rio Grande. Its habitat overlaps with that of Echeandia chandleri. It grows in habitat with scattered brush and stunted trees, grassy openings in subtropical thorn shrub, and mixed thornscrub-halophyte communities. Within South Texas, it is known only from Cameron County. A 1939 collection from Villa Juárez, Mexico identified later as Echeandia texensis constitutes the only known record of this species outside of Cameron County.

In habitat, it is commonly associated with brush and herbaceous plants, such as honey mesquite (Neltuma glandulosa), Trecul's yucca (Yucca treculeana), wild lime (Zanthoxylum fagara), Brazilian bluewood (Condalia hookeri), Texas lantana (Lantana urticoides), mule fat (Baccharis salicifolia), silver beard grass (Bothriochloa laguroides), Texas sage (Salvia coccinea), and red grama (Bouteloua trifida).

== Conservation ==
Echeandia texensis has been categorized as Critically Imperiled by NatureServe. At the time of its description in 1999, it had not been collected again since the initial collections were made prior to 1952, and Cruden suggested it was rare and possibly already extirpated from south Texas. However, as of 2023, observations of wild individuals of Echeandia texensis have been recorded on iNaturalist. It is possible that previously reported records and collections of Echeandia chandleri from Cameron County may actually be Echeandia texensis.
