= Mennega =

Mennega is a surname. Notable people with the surname include:

- Alberta Mennega (1912–2009), Dutch botanist
- Erik Albert Mennega (1923–1998), Dutch botanist
