= List of botanical gardens in the Netherlands =

Botanical gardens in Netherlands have collections consisting entirely of Netherlands native and endemic species; most have a collection that include plants from around the world. There are botanical gardens and arboreta in all states and territories of Netherlands, most are administered by local governments, some are privately owned.

- Arboretum Trompenburg, Rotterdam
- Botanical and Experimental Garden of the Radboud University of Nijmegen
- Botanische Tuinen Utrecht, Utrecht
- Botanische Tuin TU Delft, Technische Universiteit Delft
- Hortus Botanicus Amsterdam
- Hortus Botanicus VU Amsterdam, Vrije Universiteit, Amsterdam
- Hortus Botanicus Leiden
- Hortus Haren, Haren
- Pinetum Blijdenstein, Hilversum
- Von Gimborn Arboretum, Doorn
