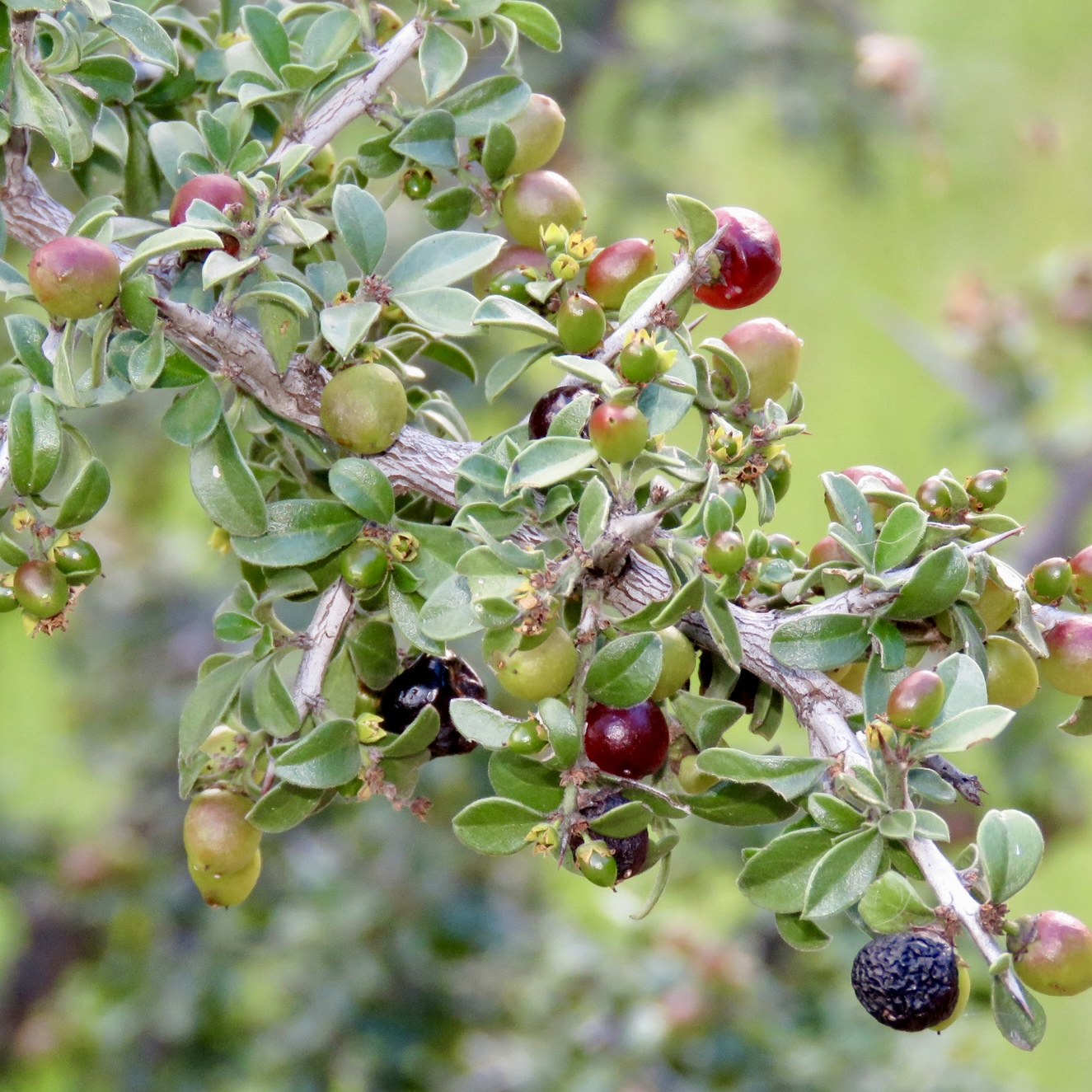

Scientific classification
- Kingdom: Plantae
- Clade: Tracheophytes
- Clade: Angiosperms
- Clade: Eudicots
- Clade: Rosids
- Order: Rosales
- Family: Rhamnaceae
- Genus: Condalia
- Species: C. correllii

Binomial name
- Condalia correllii M.C.Johnst.

= Condalia correllii =

Species of shrub

Condalia correllii, also called Correll's snakewood, is a shrub belonging to the family Rhamnaceae.

The shrub has smooth gray bark, and usually grows up to 3 m (9.8 ft) tall. The fruit is generally a deep violet-black. Leaves are linear, and it belongs to what Marshall Conring Johnston terms the linear-leaved group.

== Distribution ==
Correll's snakewood ranges across the Southwestern United States and into Northwestern Mexico, where it commonly occurs at higher elevations than Condalia globosa, generally 1,200–1,500 m (3,900–4,900 ft).

== Uses ==
It has been considered as a low water native landscape plant. It provides useful cover and forage for fruit eating birds. Flowers are notably fragrant.
