= Piet de Jong (disambiguation) =

Piet de Jong (1915–2016) was a Dutch politician.

Piet de Jong may also refer to:

- Piet de Jong (artist) (1887–1967), Dutch artist
- Piet de Jong (dendrologist) (born 1938), Dutch dendrologist
