= Piet de Jong (dendrologist) =

Dutch dendrologist

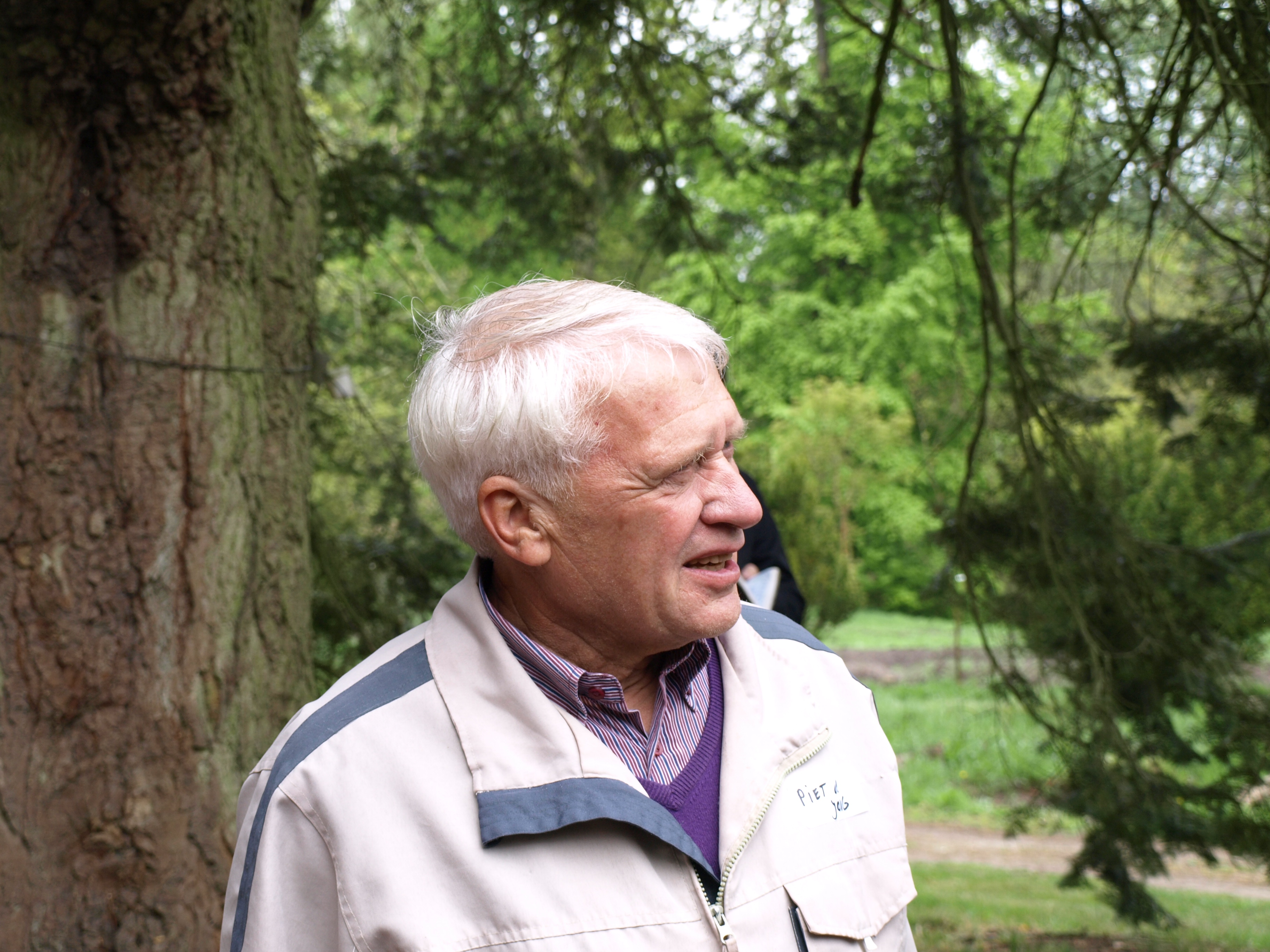
Piet de Jong

Petrus Cornelis (Piet) de Jong (born 24 March 1938 in Hazerswoude) is a Dutch dendrologist.

He was the scientific director of the Utrecht University Botanic Gardens and worked as a researcher at the Station for Nursery Stock at Boskoop. He is considered one of the world authorities on Acer, the maples.

== Biography ==
Piet de Jong was born in Bent, a hamlet halfway between Hazerswoude and Zoeterwoude. He was a farmer's son, the oldest in a family of six children. When he was seven, he started growing plants. He went to primary school at Hazerswoude, then to the gymnasium in Leiden.

In 1960, he started his studies at Wageningen University and Research Centre - which was called 'Landbouwhogeschool' (Agricultural College) in those days. He got a degree in horticultural plant breeding, with optional courses in (botanical) systematics and phytogeography, plant anatomy and virology. Afterwards, he did biosystematic research on Acer in the Laboratory of botanical systematics and phytogeography. He had been involved in research on the flowering of maples before he got his degree. The maples have always been his great passion.

In 1971 he became a researcher at the Institute for Horticultural Plant Breeding (Instituut voor de Veredeling van Tuinbouwgewassen - IVT) in Wageningen. He worked on taxonomic problems in plant breeding research and biosystematic research of lilies.

In 1976 he got his PhD with a study on maples.

In 1977 De Jong became scientific director of Utrecht University Botanic Gardens. The Von Gimborn Arboretum was part of the gardens in those days.

From 1988 to 1997, Piet de Jong was in charge of the practical research on tree growing at the 'Proefstation voor de Boomkwekerij' (Trial station for tree nursery) in Boskoop.

After his retirement De Jong is still actively involved with the Von Gimborn Arboretum.

== Bibliography ==
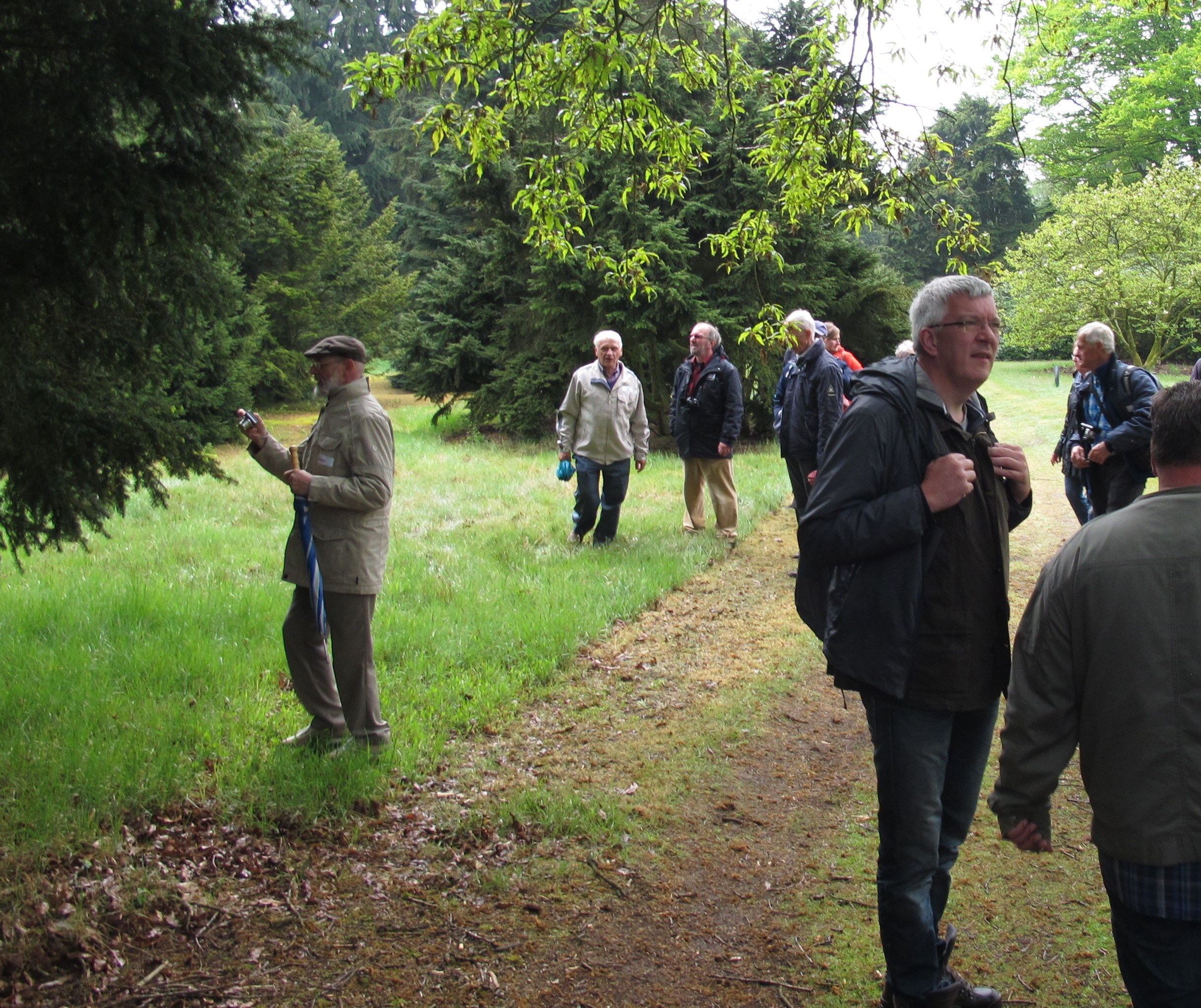
Piet de Jong (second from the left) guiding a group through the Von Gimborn Arboretum, May 2015

Some publications by P.C. de Jong are:

- 1976: Flowering and sex expression in Acer L. : A biosystematic study. Dissertation. Wageningen : H. Veenman & Zonen B.V. (also published as Mededelingen Landbouwhogeschool Wageningen 76-2 (1976) (Communications Agricultural University Wageningen, The Netherlands))
- 1986, with drs. Vijko P.A. Lukkien and Jan Tolsma: Catalogue of Plant Collections - University Botanic Gardens Utrecht, The Netherlands. Utrecht : University Botanic Gardens
- 1995, with H.J. van de Laar: Naamlijst van houtige gewassen (List of names of trees). 5th print, fully updated. Boskoop : Proefstation voor de Boomkwekerij.
- 2008: Flora of China Vol. 11, p. 515 f: 'Aceraceae'; with Tingzhi Xu, Yousheng Chen, Herman John Oterdoom and Chin-Sung Chang
- 2010: three articles in Stilte voor de storm? De future of trees in the Netherlands: 'Enkele overwegingen vooraf', 'Dynamiek van bomen in natuur en cultuur' and 'De Nederlandse Dendrologische Vereniging en exotenbeleid: a point of view' (with Wilbert L.A. Hetterscheid)
- 2013 (with Henny Kolster): Euonymus : een kleurrijk geslacht. Zeist : KNNV Uitgeverij. ISBN 978 90 5011 999 3 - 144 p.

== Literature ==
- (in Dutch) Teylingen, Ineke van (2014) - 'Piet de Jong, een kruising van een plantentaxonoom en een tuinbouwdeskundige'. In: Arbor Vitae, journal of the Nederlandse Dendrologische Vereniging (Dutch Dendrology Society), 24e jrg. nr. 1, p. 13 - 15. ISSN 1389-2851
