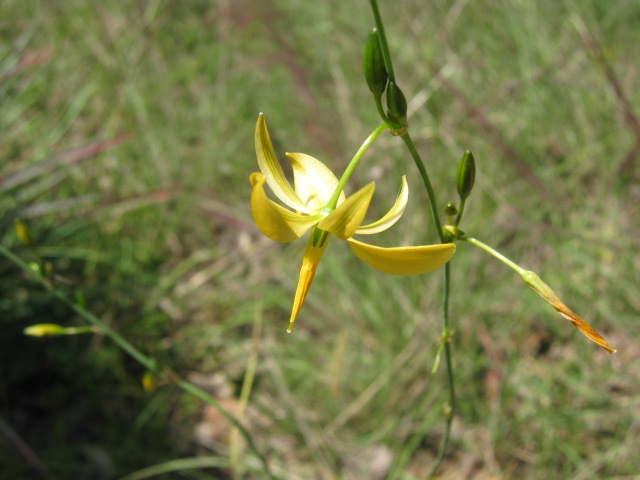
- Echeandia sp.

Scientific classification
- Kingdom: Plantae
- Clade: Tracheophytes
- Clade: Angiosperms
- Clade: Monocots
- Order: Asparagales
- Family: Asparagaceae
- Subfamily: Agavoideae
- Genus: Echeandia; Ortega

Type species
- Echeandia terniflora Ortega

Synonyms
- Hesperanthes (Baker) S.Watson

= Echeandia =

Genus of flowering plants

Echeandia (common name craglily) is a genus of New World plants in the century plant subfamily within the asparagus family.

== Etymology ==
It is named for Spanish botanist Pedro Gregorio Echeandía (1746–1817). Species in the genus are distributed from the south-western United States south to north-western Argentina, southern Bolivia, and southern Peru.

== Description ==
Echeandia are herbaceous perennials with corms and enlarged storage roots. The narrow leaves are held in basal rosettes. Flowers are arranged in loose racemes and may be yellow, orange, white or cream.

== Species ==
There are about 78 to 90 species in the genus.

1. Echeandia albiflora (Cham. & Schltdl.) M.Martens & Galeotti - Veracruz
2. Echeandia altipratensis Cruden - Guatemala
3. Echeandia atoyacana Cruden - México State, Guerrero
4. Echeandia attenuata Cruden - Sinaloa, Durango
5. Echeandia bolivarensis Cruden - Venezuela (Bolívar)
6. Echeandia breedlovei Cruden - Oaxaca, Chiapas
7. Echeandia campechiana Cruden - Campeche, Yucatán
8. Echeandia chandleri (Greenm. & C.H.Thomp.) M.C.Johnst. – Chandler's Craglily - Tamaulipas, Texas
9. Echeandia chiapensis Cruden - Oaxaca, Chiapas
10. Echeandia ciliata (Kunth) Cruden - Venezuela, Bolivia, Peru, Argentina
11. Echeandia coalcomanensis Cruden - Michoácan
12. Echeandia confertiflora Cruden - Oaxaca
13. Echeandia conzattii Cruden - Guerrero, Oaxaca
14. Echeandia denticulata Cruden - Colombia, Venezuela
15. Echeandia drepanoides (Greenm.) Cruden - Oaxaca
16. Echeandia durangensis (Greenm.) Cruden - Mexico
17. Echeandia echeandioides (Schltdl.) Cruden - Mexico
18. Echeandia elegans Cruden - Morelos, Guerrero
19. Echeandia falcata Cruden - Guanajuato, Querétaro
20. Echeandia flavescens (Schult. & Schult.f.) Cruden - Mexico, Arizona, New Mexico, Texas
21. Echeandia flexuosa Greenm. - central + southern Mexico
22. Echeandia formosa (Weath.) Cruden - Central America, Chiapas
23. Echeandia gentryi Cruden - Mexico
24. Echeandia gracilis Cruden - central Mexico
25. Echeandia grandiflora Cruden - Oaxaca
26. Echeandia hallbergii Cruden - Oaxaca
27. Echeandia herrerae (Killip) Cruden - Peru
28. Echeandia hintonii Cruden - Guerrero
29. Echeandia hirticaulis Cruden - México State, Guerrero, Michoacán
30. Echeandia imbricata Cruden - Guerrero, Jalisco, Michoacan
31. Echeandia lehmannii (Baker) Marais & Reilly - Ecuador
32. Echeandia leucantha Klotzsch - Central America, Venezuela
33. Echeandia llanicola Cruden - Oaxaca
34. Echeandia longifolia (Weath.) Cruden - Veracruz, Oaxaca, Venezuela
35. Echeandia longipedicellata Cruden - Mexico, Guatemala
36. Echeandia luteola Cruden - Belize, Yucatán Peninsula
37. Echeandia macrophylla Rose ex Weath. - San Luis Potosí
38. Echeandia magnifica López-Ferr. - Guerrero
39. Echeandia matudae Cruden - El Salvador, Guatemala, Chiapas
40. Echeandia mcvaughii Cruden - Jalisco, Nayarit
41. Echeandia mexiae Cruden - Morelos, Guerrero
42. Echeandia mexicana Cruden - Mexico
43. Echeandia michoacensis (Poelln.) Cruden - Michoacán
44. Echeandia mirandae Cruden - Puebla, Oaxaca
45. Echeandia molinae Cruden - Guatemala
46. Echeandia montealbanensis Cruden - Oaxaca
47. Echeandia nana (Baker) Cruden - Mexico
48. Echeandia nayaritensis Cruden - Sinaloa, Nayarit
49. Echeandia oaxacana Cruden - Oaxaca
50. Echeandia occidentalis Cruden - Jalisco, Michoacan, Nayarit
51. Echeandia palmeri Cruden - Chihuahua, Durango, Sonora
52. Echeandia paniculata Rose - central + southern Mexico
53. Echeandia parva Cruden - Puebla, Oaxaca
54. Echeandia parvicapsulata Cruden - Jalisco, Nayarit
55. Echeandia parviflora Baker - Mexico, Guatemala
56. Echeandia petenensis Cruden - Belize, Guatemala
57. Echeandia pihuamensis Cruden - Jalisco
58. Echeandia pittieri Cruden - Panama, Colombia, Venezuela
59. Echeandia platyphylla (Greenm.) Cruden - Puebla
60. Echeandia pseudopetiolata Cruden - Guerrero
61. Echeandia pseudoreflexa Cruden - Chiapas
62. Echeandia ramosissima (C.Presl) Cruden - Mexico
63. Echeandia reflexa (Cav.) Rose – Reflexed - Texas, Mexico, Honduras
64. Echeandia robusta Cruden - Jalisco, Michoacan
65. Echeandia sanmiguelensis Cruden - Guanajuato
66. Echeandia scabrella (Benth.) Cruden - Mexico
67. Echeandia sinaloensis Cruden - Sinaloa, Jalisco
68. Echeandia skinneri (Baker) Cruden - Central America, Chiapas
69. Echeandia smithii Cruden - Oaxaca
70. Echeandia tamaulipensis Cruden - Tamaulipas
71. Echeandia taxacana Cruden - Mexico
72. Echeandia tenuifolia Cruden - Oaxaca
73. Echeandia tenuis (Weath.) Cruden - Guerrero
74. Echeandia texensis Cruden – Texas Craglily - Texas
75. Echeandia udipratensis Cruden - Jalisco
76. Echeandia vaginata Cruden - Oaxaca
77. Echeandia venusta Woodson - Panama
78. Echeandia vestita (Baker) Cruden - Mexico, Guatemala
79. Echeandia weberbaueri (Poelln.) Cruden - Peru
80. Echeandia williamsii Cruden - Guatemala, Honduras
