= Cyperus onerosus =

Scientific classification
- Kingdom: Plantae
- Clade: Tracheophytes
- Clade: Angiosperms
- Clade: Monocots
- Clade: Commelinids
- Order: Poales
- Family: Cyperaceae
- Genus: Cyperus
- Species: C. onerosus

Binomial name
- Cyperus onerosus M.C.Johnst., 1964
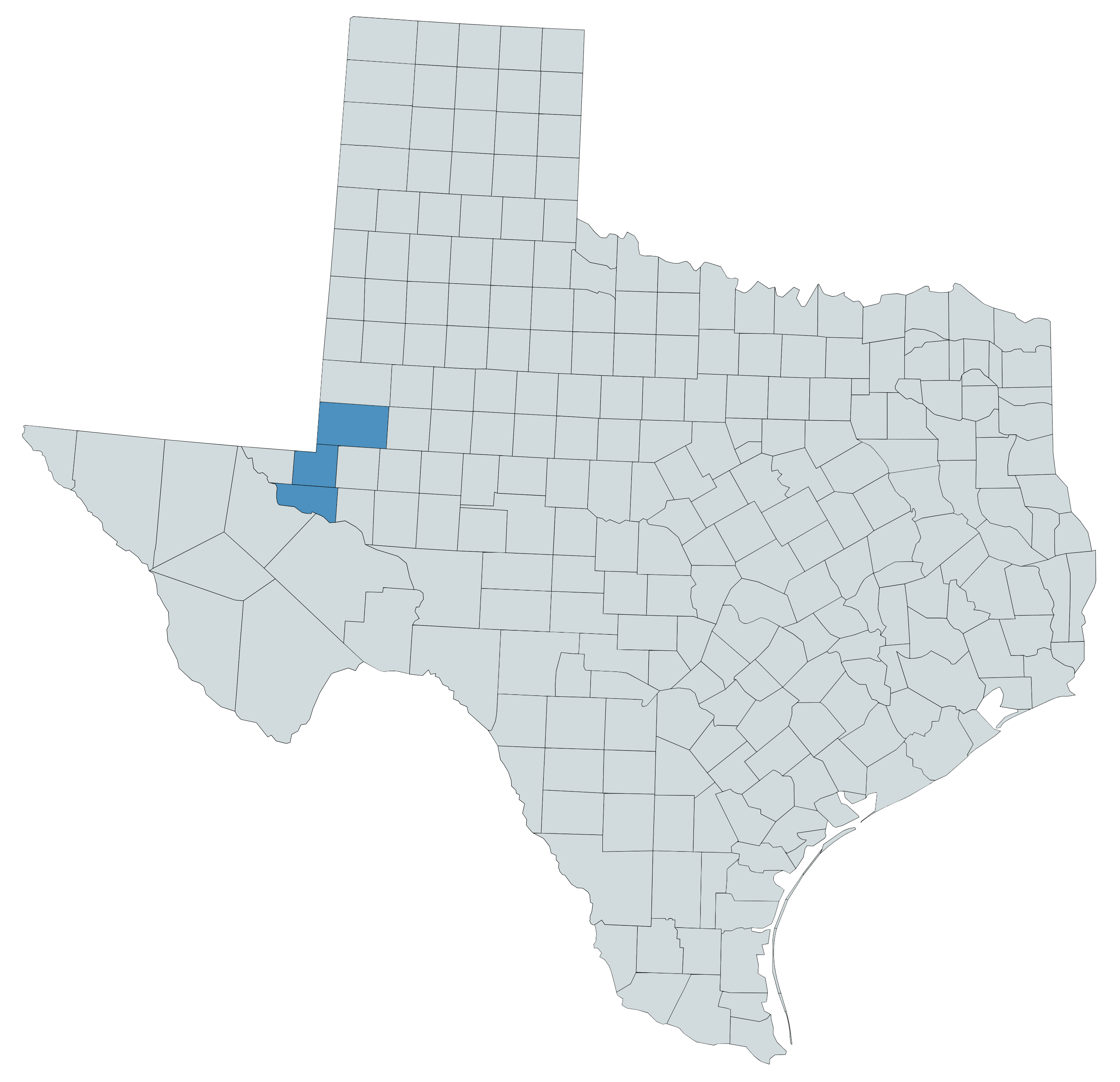
- Range of Cyperus onerosus

Species of sedge

Cyperus onerosus is a species of sedge that is endemic to Andrews, Ward, and Winkler counties in Texas.

== See also ==
- List of Cyperus species
