= Erik Albert Mennega =

Dutch botanist

Erik Mennega
- Born: 6 January 1923; Nijmegen
- Died: 27 January 1998 (aged 75)
- Education: Utrecht University
- Scientific career
- Fields: Botany
- Workplaces: Utrecht University
- Author abbrev. (botany): E.A.Mennega

Erik Albert Mennega (6 January 1923 – 27 January 1998) was a Dutch botanist, plant taxonomist, and author.

== Biography ==
Mennega studied biology at Utrecht University, receiving his degree in 1947. He was then hired as a taxonomist at the Utrecht University Botanic Gardens. He spent much of his time identifying botanical collections at the original garden in Baarn, as well as identifying and documenting species at the Von Gimborn Arboretum. He remained at the gardens until his retirement in 1984.

In 1988, Frans Stafleu and Richard Sumner Cowan published the second edition of Taxonomic Literature: A Selective Guide to Botanical Publications and Collections, with Dates, Commentaries, and Types. After Cowan left the project, Stafleu began collaborating with Mennega on a supplement series. The two wrote and published six volumes between 1992 and 2000, the last two posthumously. Mennega took over the majority of writing and compiling after 1995 due to the decline of Stafleu's health. Mennega himself died of a heart attack on 27 January 1998.

Botanist Alberta Mennega was Mennega's aunt.

== Selected publications ==
- Stafleu, F. A., Cowan, R. S., & Mennega, E. A. (1979). Taxonomic literature: A selective guide to botanical publications and collections with dates, commentaries and types. Utrecht: Bohn, Scheltema & Holkema.
- Mennega, E. A. (1985). Bibliography of the Annonaceae. Utrecht, Netherlands: Institute of Systematic Botany.
- Mennega, E. A., Rooij, W. C. M. T., Jansen-Jacobs, M. J., & Fanshawe, D. B. (1988). Check-list of woody plants of Guyana. Ede, the Netherlands: Tropenbos Foundation.
