= Echeandia flavescens =

Conservation status
- Least Concern (IUCN 3.1)

Scientific classification
- Kingdom: Plantae
- Clade: Tracheophytes
- Clade: Angiosperms
- Clade: Monocots
- Order: Asparagales
- Family: Asparagaceae
- Subfamily: Agavoideae
- Genus: Echeandia
- Species: E. flavescens

Binomial name
- Echeandia flavescens (Schult. & Schult.f.) Cruden

Synonyms
- Synonymy: Anthericum condensum H.E.Moore; Anthericum durangense Greenm.; Anthericum flavescens Schult. & Schult.f.; Anthericum leptophyllum (Benth.) Baker; Anthericum leptophyllum var. grandiflorum Poelln.; Anthericum leptophyllum var. lanceolatum Poelln.; Anthericum nelsonii Greenm.; Anthericum pringlei Poelln.; Anthericum stenocarpum Baker; Anthericum torreyi Baker; Anthericum torreyi var. arizonicum Poelln.; Anthericum torreyi var. etlaense Poelln.; Anthericum torreyi var. lanceolatum Poelln.; Anthericum torreyi var. neomexicanum Poelln.; Echeandia denticulata Cruden; Echeandia durangensis (Greenm.) Cruden; Echeandia leptophylla Benth.; Echeandia pusilla Brandegee; Echeandia terniflora var. angustifolia Torr.; Hesperanthes leptophylla (Benth.) S.Watson; Hesperanthes stenocarpa (Baker) S.Watson; Hesperanthes torreyi (Baker) S.Watson; Liliago flavescens (Schult. & Schult.f.) C.Presl; Phalangium flavescens (Schult. & Schult.f.) Kunth; Trachyandra nana Schltdl.

Species of flowering plant

Echeandia flavescens is a species of flowering plant in the family Asparagaceae. Its common name is Torrey's craglily.

== Description ==
The Torrey's Craglily has six golden-yellow tepals with thinner tepals being between thicker tepals. It has golden-yellow stamens and thin, long green leaves grown at the base of the plant.

== Range ==
Echeandia flavescens is native to Arizona, New Mexico, southwestern Texas, Mexico, Colombia, and Venezuela.

== Habitat ==
Can be found in juniper, oak, and pine woodlands in the mountains and in grasslands.
