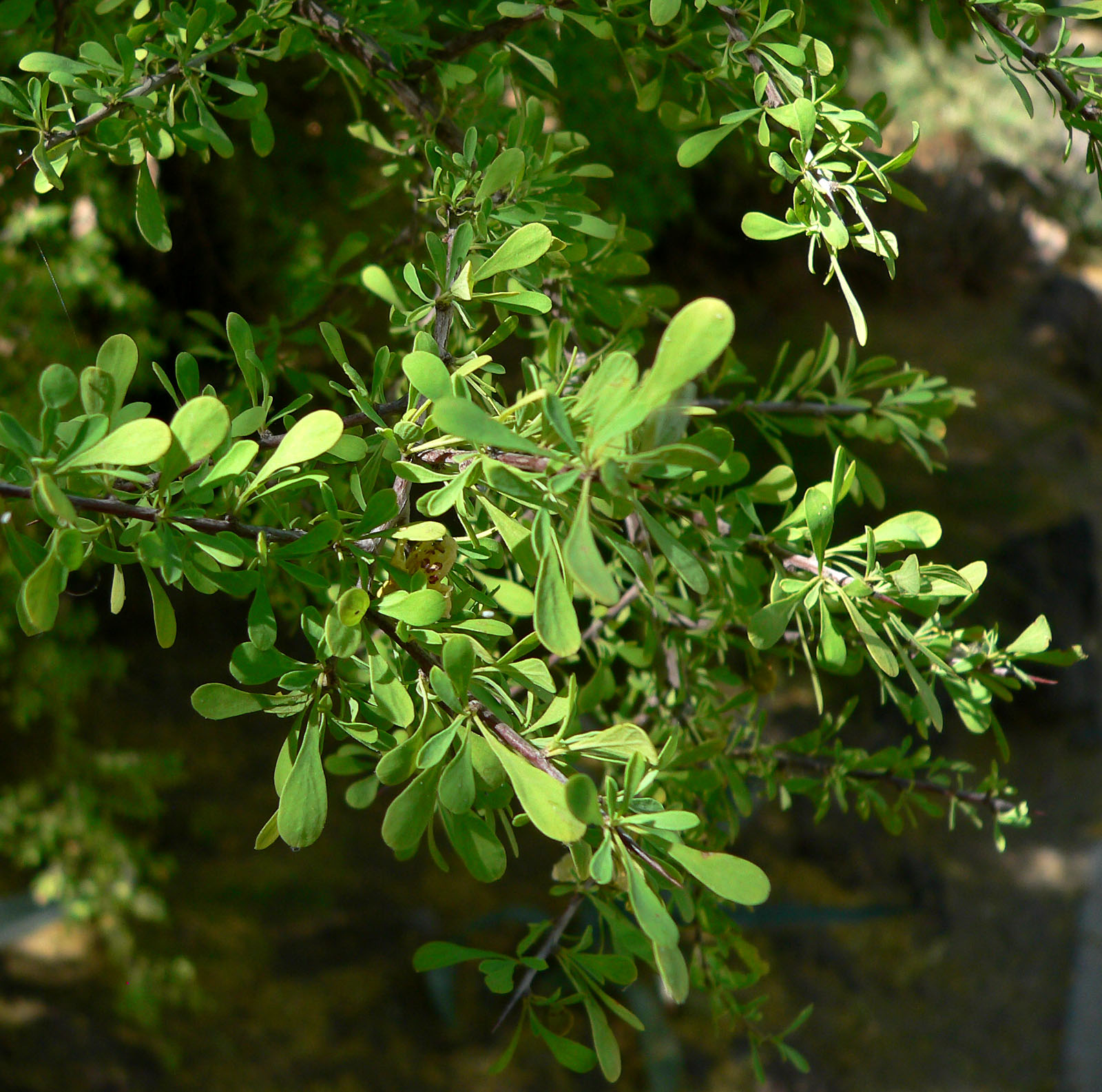
- C. globosa

Scientific classification
- Kingdom: Plantae
- Clade: Tracheophytes
- Clade: Angiosperms
- Clade: Eudicots
- Clade: Rosids
- Order: Rosales
- Family: Rhamnaceae
- Tribe: Rhamneae
- Genus: Condalia; Cav.

Species
- See text

Synonyms
- Microrhamnus A.Gray

= Condalia =

Genus of flowering plants

Condalia is a genus of spiny shrubs in the tribe Rhamneae of the buckthorn family, Rhamnaceae. It was named for Antonio Condal, an 18th-century Spanish physician. Members of the genus are native to tropical and subtropical deserts and xeric shrublands in North and South America. The ranges of each species vary considerably; some are confined to only a few square miles, while others can be found on an area up to 1,000 sq mi (2,600 km^{2}).

== Common names ==
Condalia species are often referred to as bluewood, purple haw, logwood, or snakewood in English. Some southern hemisphere species are known as "piquillín" or "yuna". The name snakewood is broadly used and does not indicate any particular species.

== Taxonomy ==
Research performed on the members of Condalia usually concerns only the species native to North or South America; taxonomy is determined for only one group of species. As a result, a consensus has not been reached regarding the composition of the genus.

== Uses ==
The amount of research conducted on the economic and medical uses of Condalia species is small. However, biochemical features of this genus are currently being studied.

The fruit of Condalia hookeri are edible, consumed by birds, and can be made into jelly.

== Species ==
- Condalia buxifolia Reissek
- Condalia correllii M.C.Johnst. – Correll's snakewood
- Condalia ericoides (A.Gray) M.C.Johnst. – javelina bush
- Condalia globosa I.M.Johnst. – bitter snakewood (Southwestern United States, northwestern Mexico)
- Condalia hookeri M.C.Johnst. – Brazilian bluewood
- Condalia mexicana Schltdl. - Mexican bluewood
- Condalia microphylla Cav. – piquillín (Argentina)
- Condalia spathulata A.Gray – knifeleaf condalia
- Condalia velutina I.M.Johnst.
- Condalia viridis I.M.Johnst. – green snakewood
- Condalia warnockii M.C.Johnst. – warnock snakewood
- Condalia weberbaeuri Perkins – yana yana

=== Formerly placed here ===
- Ziziphus obtusifolia (Hook. ex Torr. & A.Gray) A.Gray (as C. lycioides (A.Gray) Weberb.)
