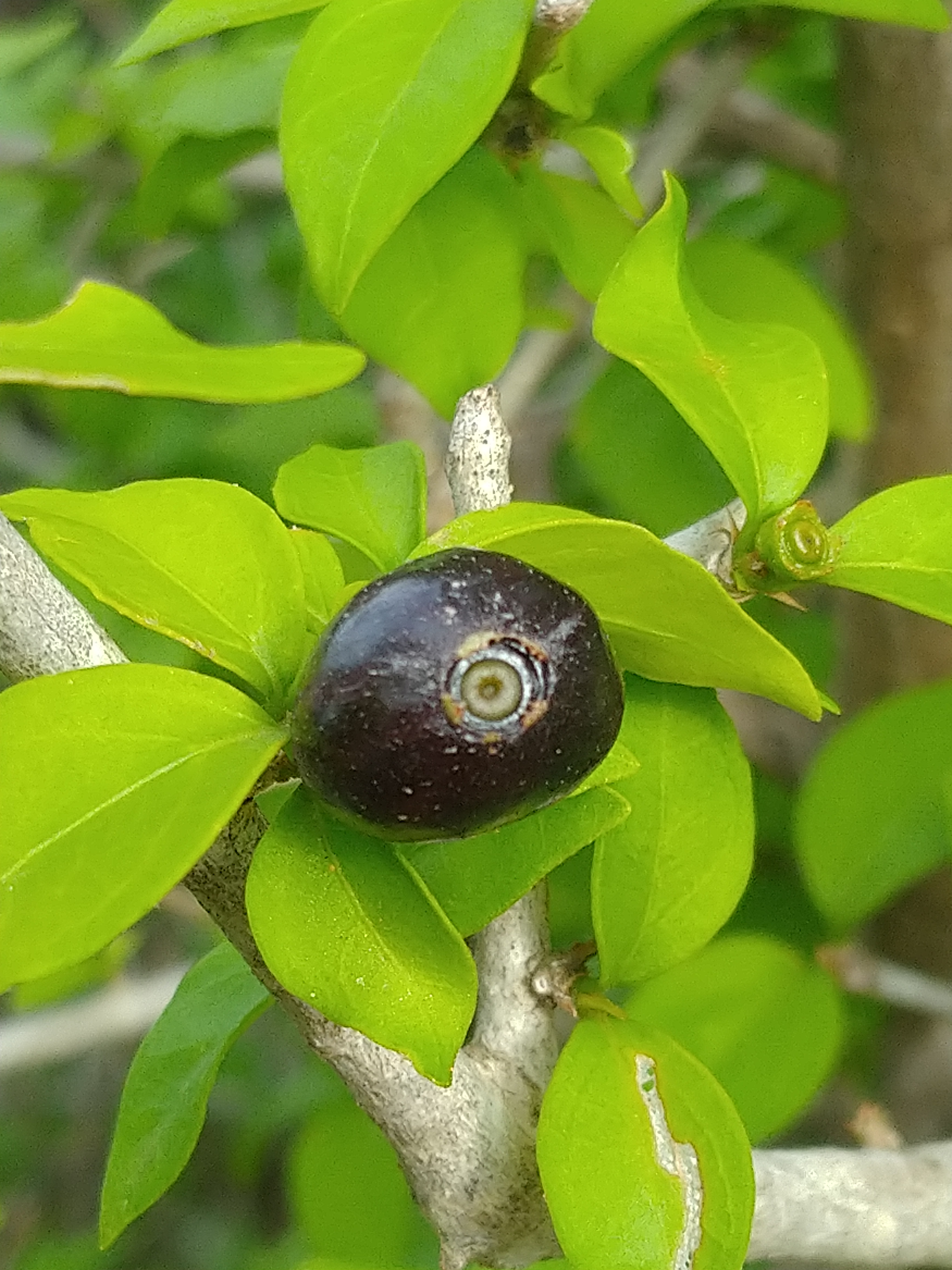
- Its fruit is edible and may be made into a jelly
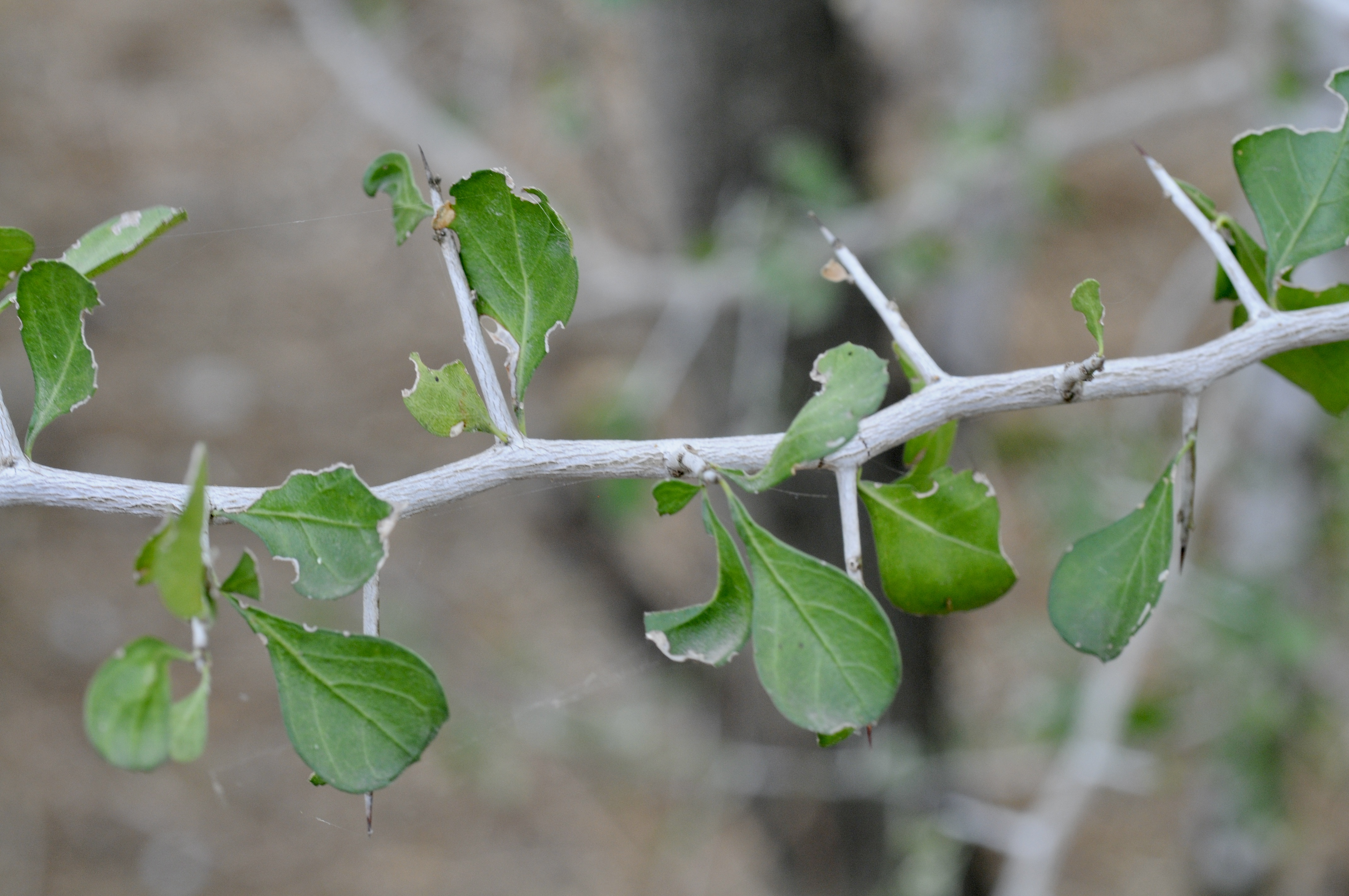
- Branch with older leaves

Conservation status
- Least Concern (IUCN 3.1)

Scientific classification
- Kingdom: Plantae
- Clade: Tracheophytes
- Clade: Angiosperms
- Clade: Eudicots
- Clade: Rosids
- Order: Rosales
- Family: Rhamnaceae
- Genus: Condalia
- Species: C. hookeri

Binomial name
- Condalia hookeri M.C.Johnst.
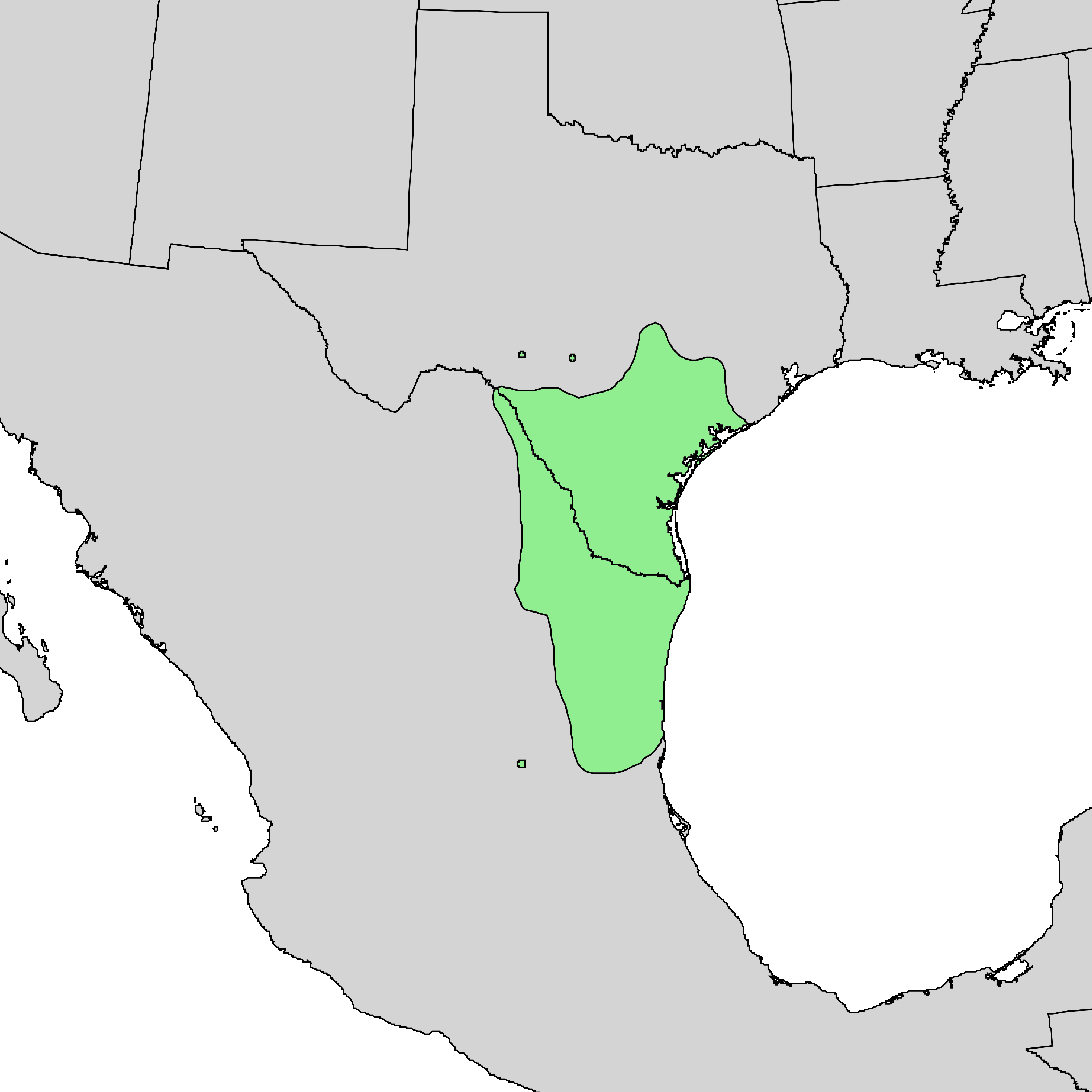
- Condalia hookeri range

Synonyms
- Condalia hookeri var. edwardsiana (Carey) M.C.Johnst.; Condalia obovata Hook.; Condalia obovata var. angustifolia Loes.; Condalia obovata var. edwardsiana Carey

= Condalia hookeri =

Species of plant

Condalia hookeri, called the Brazilian bluewood, is a widespread species of flowering plant in the family Rhamnaceae, native to Texas and eastern Mexico. It is a thorny shrub or small tree reaching 6 m (20 ft) but usually much shorter. Typically it is found growing in marginal habitats such as limestone slopes, sandstone bluffs, lunettes, shell ridges, juniper-dominated woodlands, or along watercourses, often in clayey or sandy soils, at elevations from 10 to 400 m (30 to 1,300 ft). It may come to dominate an area as a thorny scrubland.

== Names ==
Condalia hookeri goes by a number of misleading common names, including Brazilian bluewood, bluewood condalia, brasil, brasilwood, bluewood, logwood, purple haw, Edwards' bluewood, and capul negro, some of which are shared by other members of its genus. Some of the names refer a blue dye that is obtained from its dense wood.
