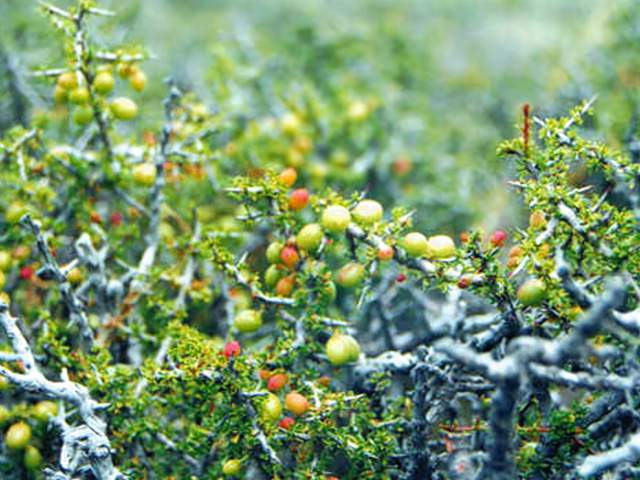
- Unripe fruit of Condalia microphylla

Scientific classification
- Kingdom: Plantae
- Clade: Tracheophytes
- Clade: Angiosperms
- Clade: Eudicots
- Clade: Rosids
- Order: Rosales
- Family: Rhamnaceae
- Genus: Condalia
- Species: C. microphylla

Binomial name
- Condalia microphylla Cav.

Synonyms
- Condalia lineata A.Gray 1854

= Condalia microphylla =

Species of flowering plant

Condalia microphylla is a perennial shrub of the family Rhamnaceae endemic to Argentina.
