= Johnstonalia =

Scientific classification
- Kingdom: Plantae
- Clade: Tracheophytes
- Clade: Angiosperms
- Clade: Eudicots
- Clade: Rosids
- Order: Rosales
- Family: Rhamnaceae
- Genus: Johnstonalia; Tortosa
- Species: J. axilliflora

Binomial name
- Johnstonalia axilliflora (M.C.Johnst.) Tortosa

Synonyms
- Gouania axilliflora M.C.Johnst.; Johnstonia axilliflora (M.C.Johnst.) Tortosa

Genus of plants

Johnstonalia is a monotypic genus of flowering plants belonging to the family Rhamnaceae. The only species is Johnstonalia axilliflora (M.C.Johnst.) Tortosa

It is native to Peru.

The genus name of Johnstonalia is in honour of Marshall Conring Johnston (b. 1930), an American botanist who made several explorations in Mexico and specialized in plants in the family Gesneriaceae. The Latin specific epithet of axilliflora refers to axillary meaning borne in or arising from the axil (the junction of leaf and stem) and also 'flora' meaning flower. Both genus and species were first described and published in Novon Vol.16 on page 433 in 2006.
