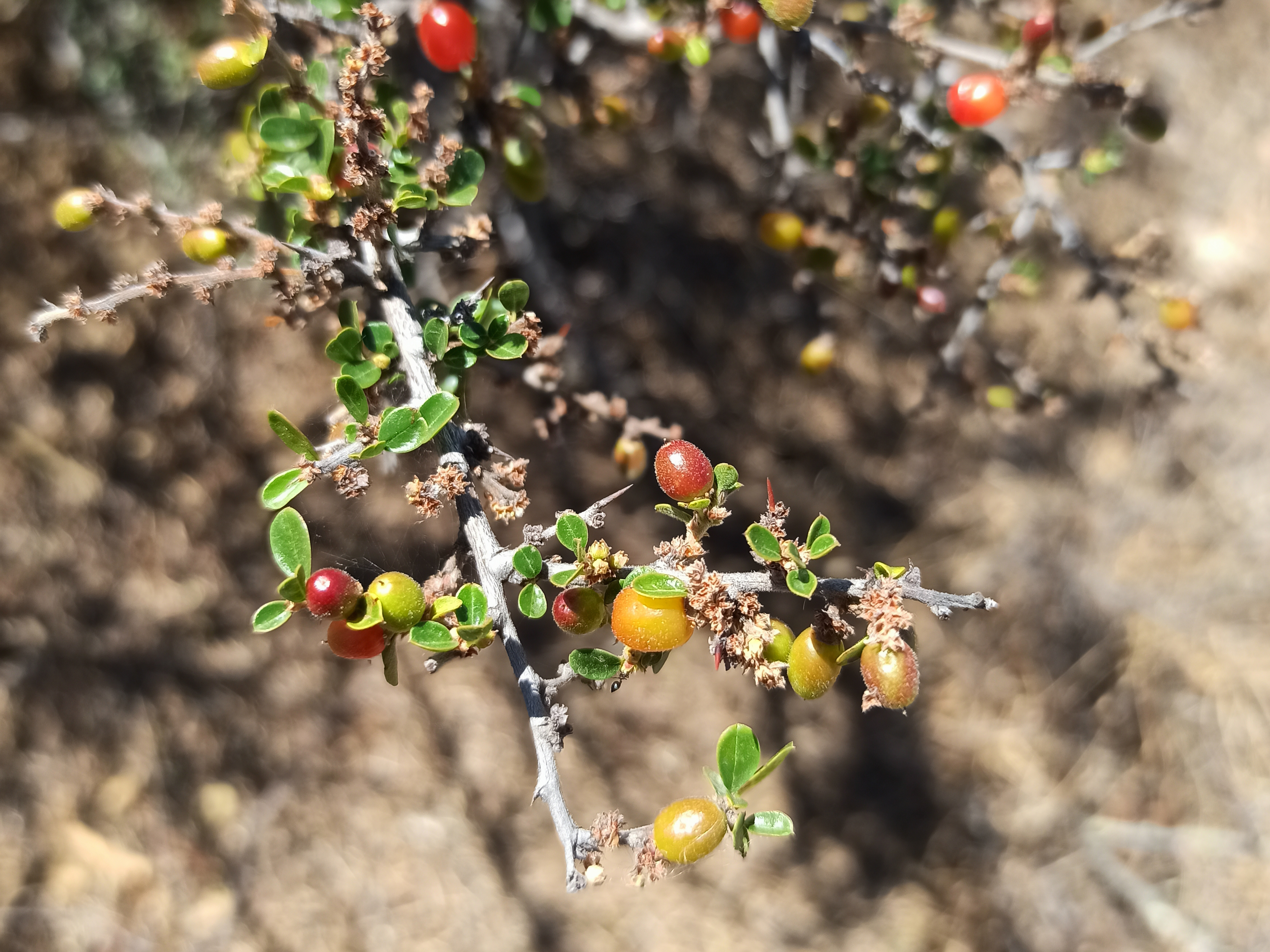

Conservation status
- Least Concern (IUCN 3.1)

Scientific classification
- Kingdom: Plantae
- Clade: Tracheophytes
- Clade: Angiosperms
- Clade: Eudicots
- Clade: Rosids
- Order: Rosales
- Family: Rhamnaceae
- Genus: Condalia
- Species: C. velutina

Binomial name
- Condalia velutina I.M.Johnst.

= Condalia velutina =

Species of shrub

Condalia velutina, known as red logwood, zarcigüil, zarzagüil or asebuche, is a species of thorny shrub of the Rhamnaceae family endemic to Mexico.

== Description ==
The bush usually has heights from 2 to 5 meters high with primary branches of 15 to 35 centimeters in length and secondary branches of 3 to 10 centimeters and internodes of 4 to 14 millimeters. The leaves are usually 7 to 19 millimeters long and 5 to 10 millimeters wide with a midrib and 4 to 5 pairs of secondary veins. The fruit when ripe has a color that varies from intense red to light brown, one seed and a length of approximately 10 millimeters; the fruits are edible, having a bittersweet taste. The bark is often used as an oral pain reliever by making an infusion in water and rinsing the mouth with the resulting liquid.

It is usually found in soils derived from igneous rock, sharing an environment in oak forests (Quercus), thickets and grasslands. Its altitude varies between 1,800 and 2,400 meters above sea level. Its population extends in most of the states of Guanajuato and Querétaro, in the south of San Luis Potosí, north-central Michoacán, northeast of Jalisco, northwest of the State of Mexico and west of Hidalgo.
