= Alberta Mennega =

Dutch botanist (1912–2009)

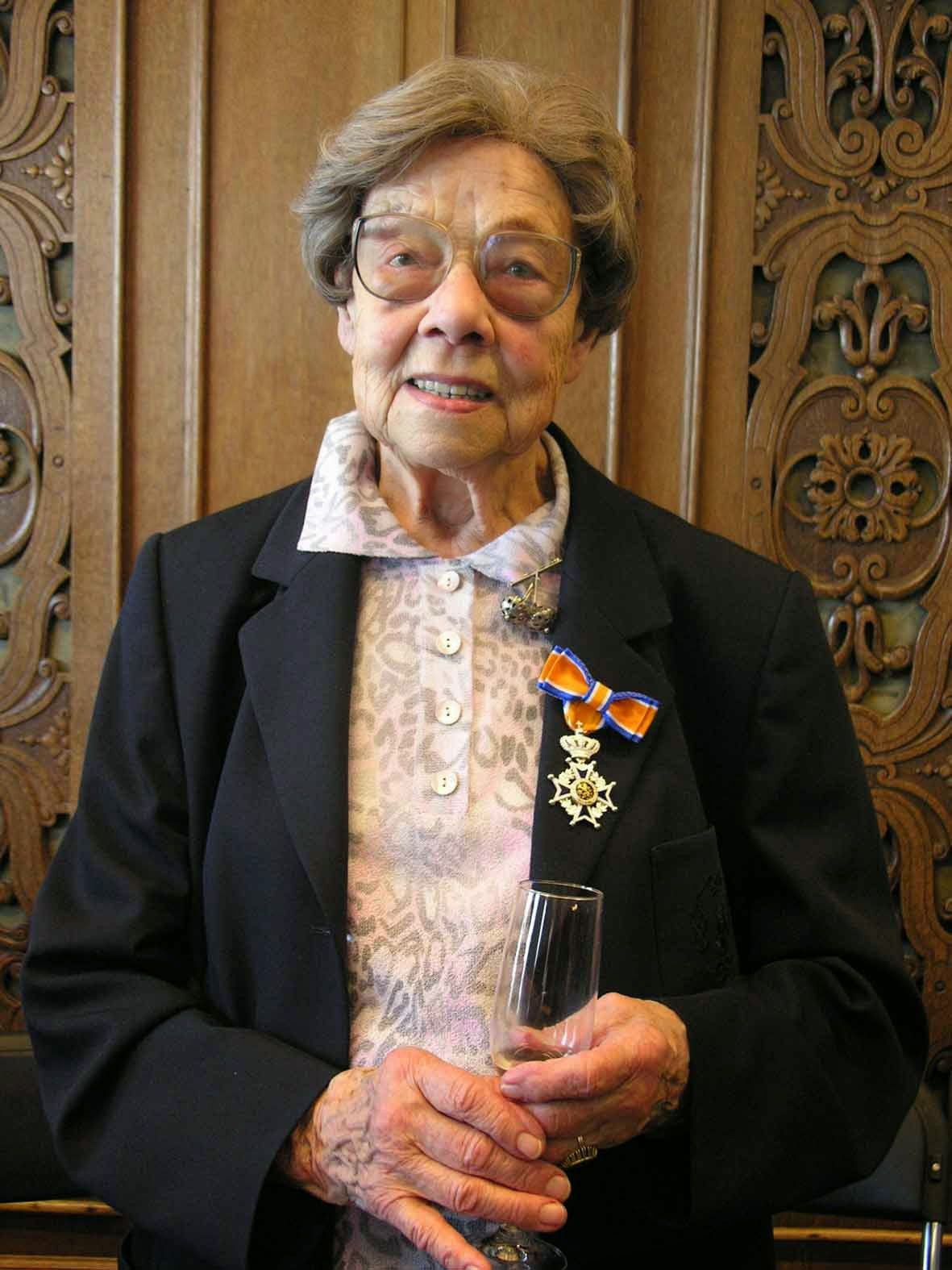
- Born: 14 August 1912; Nijmegen
- Died: 20 December 2009 (aged 97); Doorn
- Education: Utrecht University
- Scientific career
- Fields: Botany
- Workplaces: Utrecht University
- Author abbrev. (botany): Mennega

Alberta Maria Wilhelmina "Bep" Mennega (29 July 1912 – 20 December 2009) was a Dutch botanist renowned for her studies into the anatomy of wood and plant systematics. The standard author abbreviation Mennega is used to indicate this person as the author when citing a botanical name.

== Biography ==
Mennega studied biology at the Utrecht University, earning her Ph.D in 1938. In 1946, she accepted a position at the Utrecht University Botanic Gardens. The university was in need of people who were able to assess the quality of imported wood, and although her educational background was in physiology, she was retrained in wood anatomy. While working at the university, she started a world renowned wood collection. Mennega's research also contributed significately to the flora of Suriname.

Mennega retired from the university in 1977. In 1988, she founded the Alberta Mennega Foundation as a scholarship for students and researchers in the field of botany, prioritizing the funding of fieldwork in the tropics.

Botanist Erik Albert Mennega was Mennega's nephew.

== Honors ==
In 2007, Mennega was awarded as a knight of the Order of Orange-Nassau.

The genus Mennegoxylon and the species Salacia mennegana were named in her honor.
