= Echeandia mexicana =

Scientific classification
- Kingdom: Plantae
- Clade: Tracheophytes
- Clade: Angiosperms
- Clade: Monocots
- Order: Asparagales
- Family: Asparagaceae
- Subfamily: Agavoideae
- Genus: Echeandia
- Species: E. mexicana

Binomial name
- Echeandia mexicana Cruden

Species of flowering plant

Echeandia mexicana is a species of flowering plant in the family Asparagaceae. It is a tuberous geophyte which is endemic to Mexico.

== Description ==
Echeandia mexicana has six bright yellow tepals with a thinner tepal in between a broader tepal. Six bright yellow stamens form together outwards to make a tubular structure, with the style coming out of the center of the tube. Long linear leaves grow near the base of the plant.

== Range ==
It is native to eastern, central, and southwestern Mexico.

== Taxonomy ==
There are many taxa related to this species that occur in Mexico and South America but are not well researched.
