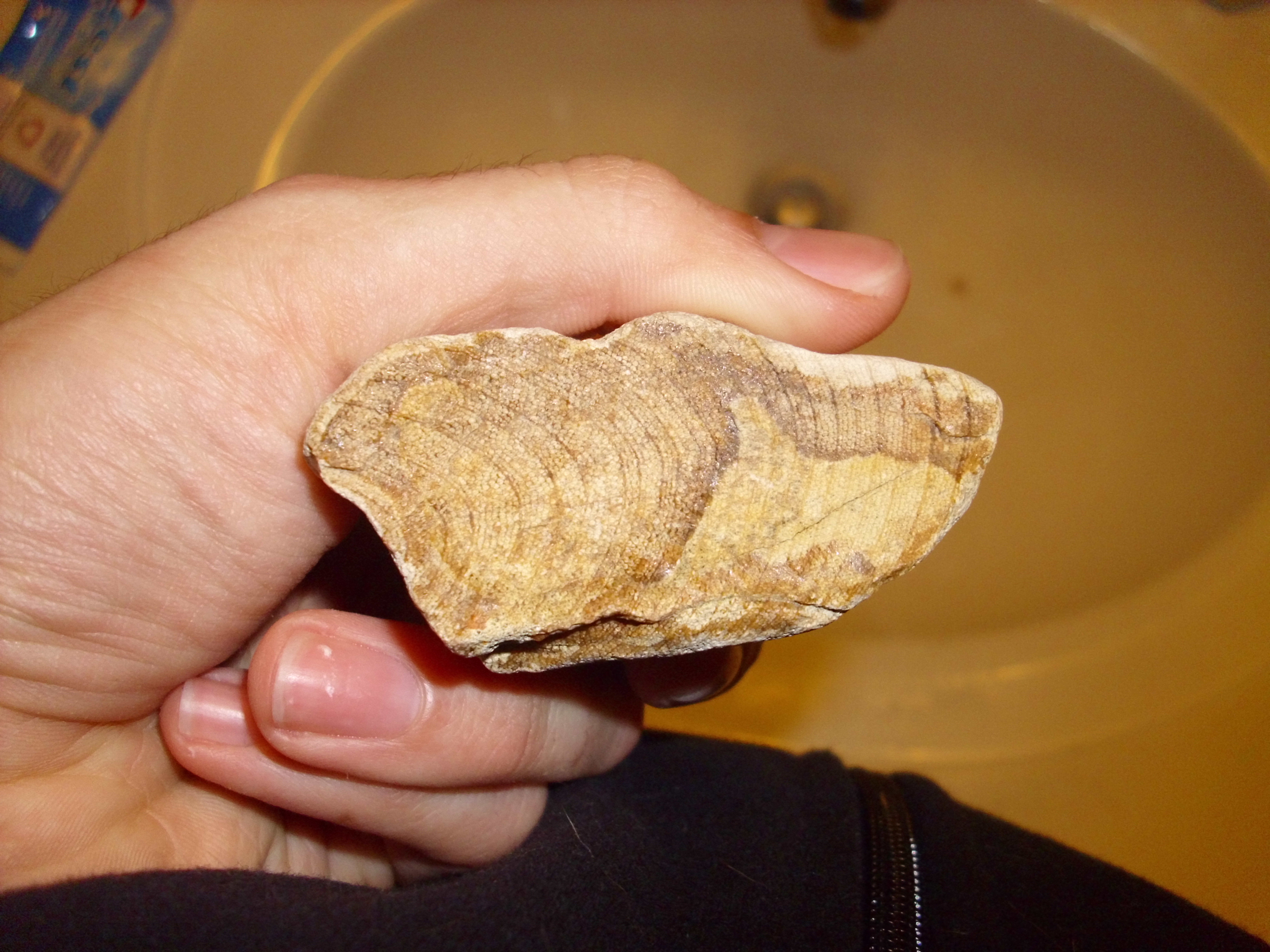
- Mennegoxylon specimen

Scientific classification
- Kingdom: Plantae
- Clade: Tracheophytes
- Clade: Angiosperms
- Clade: Eudicots
- Order: Caryophyllales
- Family: Nyctaginaceae
- Genus: †Mennegoxylon; F.M.Hueber, E.M.V.Nambudiri, W.D.Tidwell & E.F.Wheeler

Type species
- Mennegoxylon jonesii

= Mennegoxylon =

Extinct genus of trees

Mennegoxylon, commonly referred to as snakewood, is a genus of now extinct trees exhibiting a cell structure resembling snake skin when viewed in cross section. Mennegoxylon is found in the Eocene age Yegua Formation of Texas and Louisiana, United States. Specifically, many examples of snakewood have been found in College Station, Texas.

It has been classified as a genus in the Nyctaginaceae. The type species is Mennegoxylon jonesii. The genus is named for Alberta Mennega.
