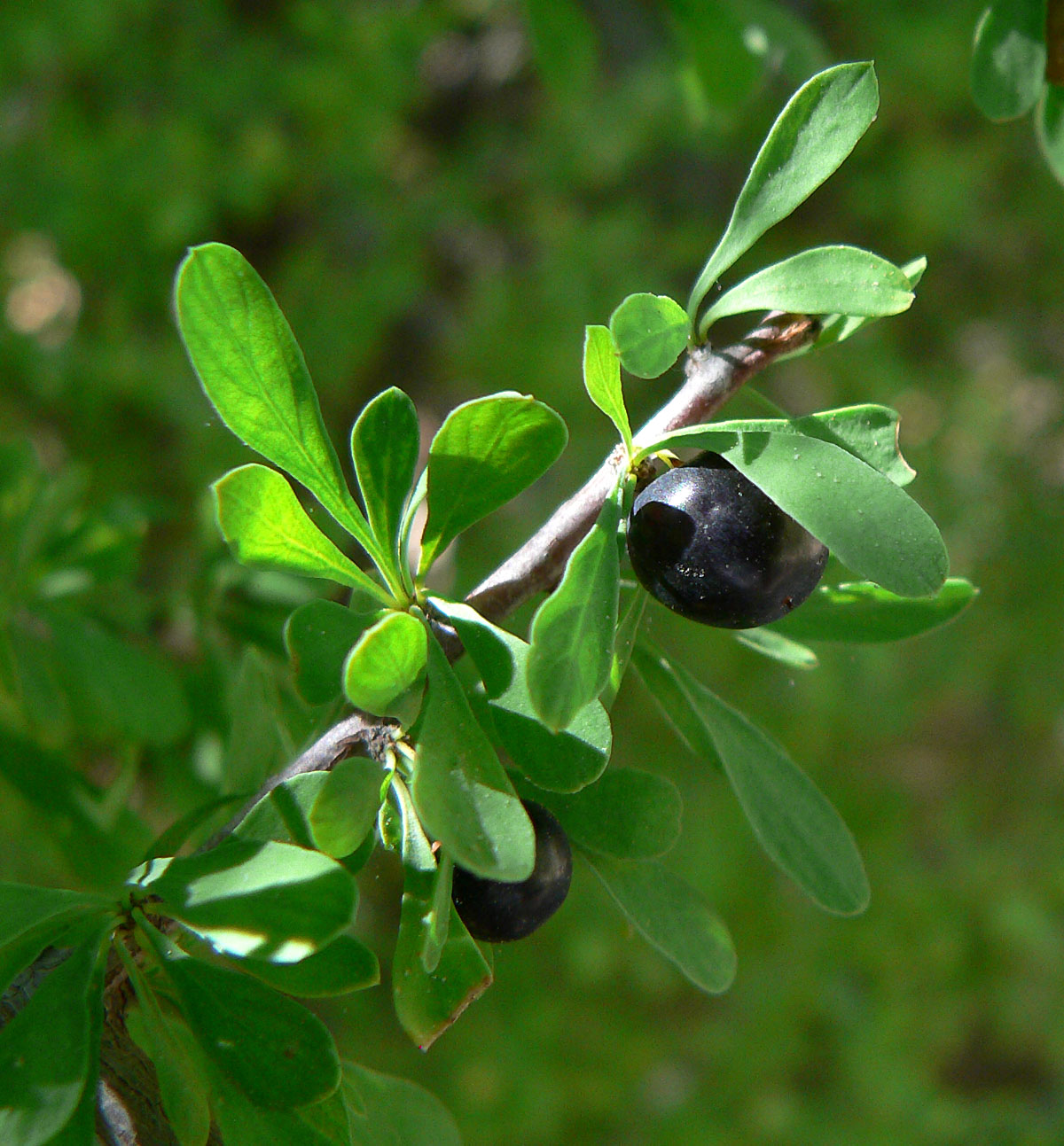
- Close-up: branch, leaves, and violet-black fruit

Conservation status
- Least Concern (IUCN 3.1)

Scientific classification
- Kingdom: Plantae
- Clade: Tracheophytes
- Clade: Angiosperms
- Clade: Eudicots
- Clade: Rosids
- Order: Rosales
- Family: Rhamnaceae
- Genus: Condalia
- Species: C. globosa

Binomial name
- Condalia globosa I.M.Johnst.

Varieties
- Condalia globosa var. globosa; Condalia globosa var. pubescens I.M.Johnst.
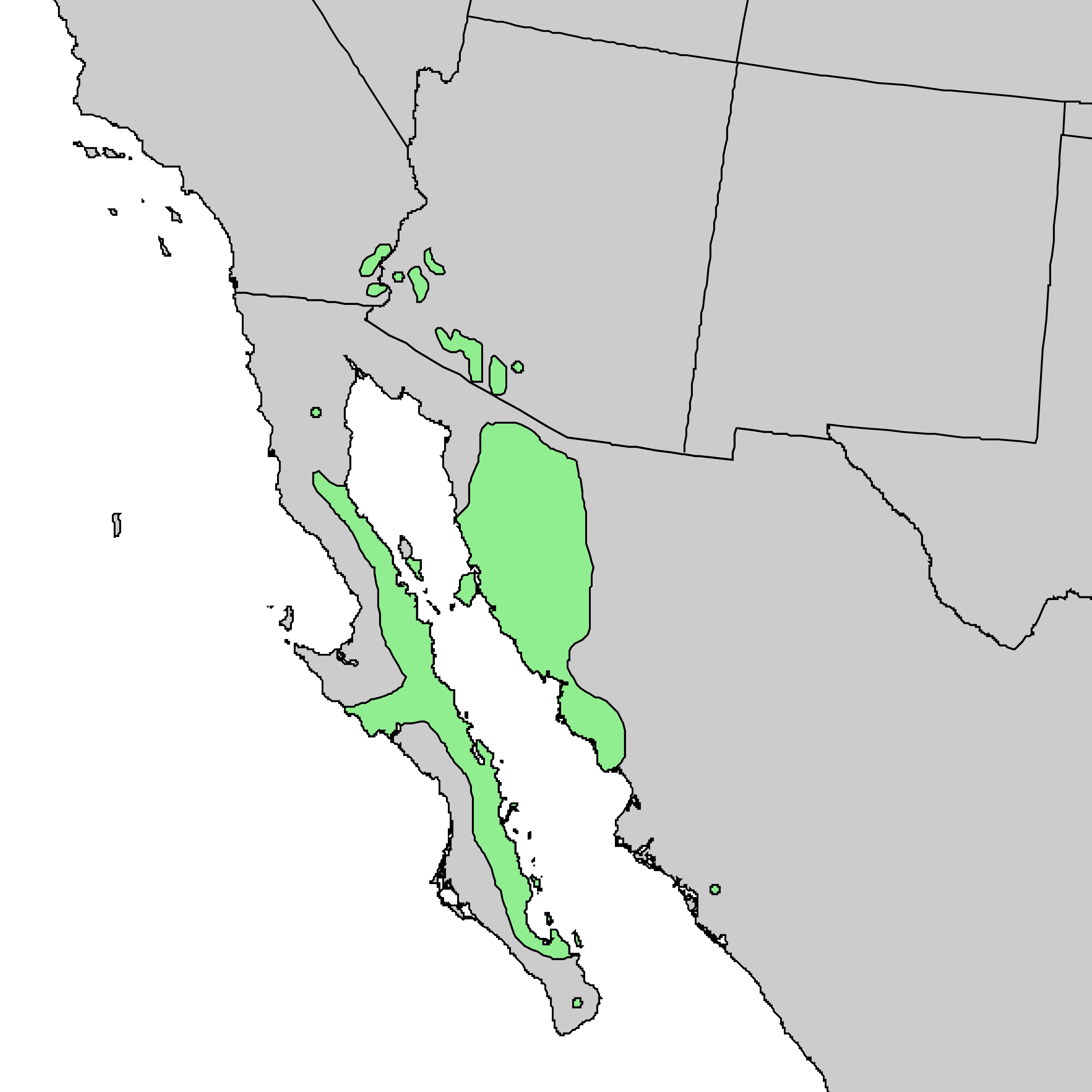
- Natural range

= Condalia globosa =

Species of tree

Condalia globosa, also called bitter condalia, or bitter snakewood, is a perennial shrub, small tree of the family Rhamnaceae.

The tree or shrub is a gray, smooth barked tree, up to 4m tall. The fruit can be deep violet-black.

== Distribution ==
Bitter condalia's greatest range is in Northwestern Mexico in the desert regions of Sonora and the Gulf of California, east regions of Baja California and Baja California Sur. The range extends onto the islands in the Gulf of California, and northwards into southwest Sonoran Desert Arizona and Colorado Desert southeast California; all these regions of Sonora, the Bajas, and the southeast Colorado Desert, are all regions of the Sonoran Desert, the lowest elevation, highest temperature regions.

In Sonora, Mexico, the center of its range is opposite the species range in the Bajas, across the Gulf of California. The range in Sonora avoids the hottest Gran Desierto de Altar of Sonora in the northwest (about a sixth of Sonoran geography), and bitter condalia does not extend eastwards into the foothills of the northern Sierra Madre Occidental cordillera (about one third of Sonora). The species is also recorded in locales of northern and central Sinaloa.
