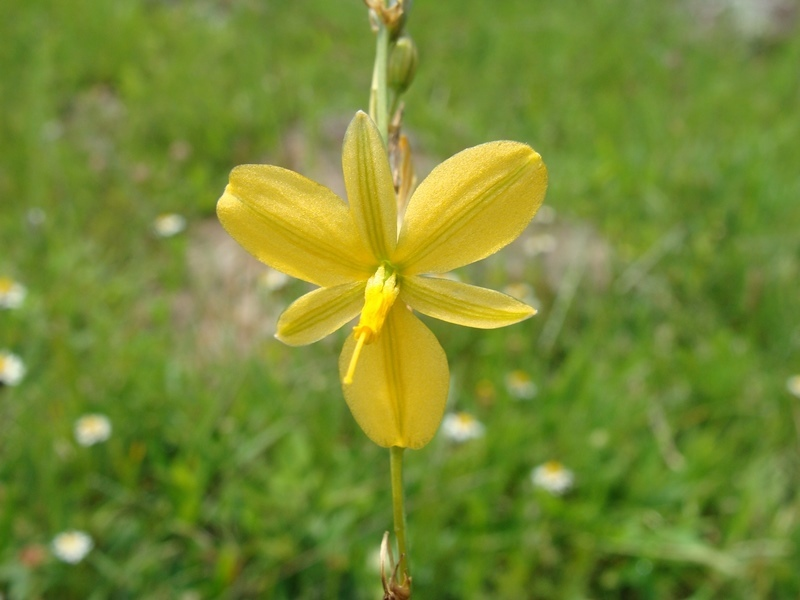

Scientific classification
- Kingdom: Plantae
- Clade: Tracheophytes
- Clade: Angiosperms
- Clade: Monocots
- Order: Asparagales
- Family: Asparagaceae
- Subfamily: Agavoideae
- Genus: Echeandia
- Species: E. reflexa

Binomial name
- Echeandia reflexa (Cav.) Rose

Synonyms
- Anthericum reflexum Cav.; Echeandia macrocarpa Greenm.; Echeandia terniflora Ortega; Phalangium reflexum (Cav.) Poir.; Conanthera echeandia Pers.

= Echeandia reflexa =

Species of plant

Echeandia reflexa is a species of flowering plant in the family Asparagaceae from south Texas through Mexico to Honduras. It was first described by Antonio José Cavanilles in 1795 as Anthericum reflexum and moved to Echeandia by Joseph Nelson Rose in 1906. It is placed in the subfamily Agavoideae.
