= Acacia hamersleyensis =

Karijini wattle

Scientific classification
- Kingdom: Plantae
- Clade: Embryophytes
- Clade: Tracheophytes
- Clade: Spermatophytes
- Clade: Angiosperms
- Clade: Eudicots
- Clade: Rosids
- Order: Fabales
- Family: Fabaceae
- Subfamily: Caesalpinioideae
- Clade: Mimosoid clade
- Genus: Acacia
- Species: A. hamersleyensis

Binomial name
- Acacia hamersleyensis Maslin
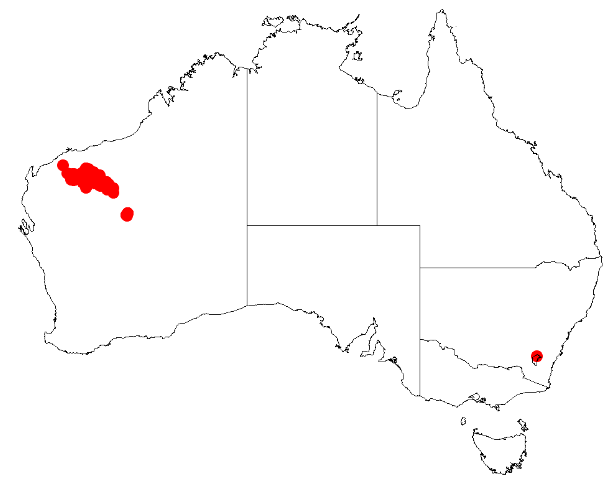
- Occurrence data from AVH

Synonyms
- Racosperma hamersleyense (Maslin) Pedley

Species of legume

Acacia hamersleyensis, also known as Karijini wattle or Hamersley Range wattle, is a species of flowering plant in the family Fabaceae and is endemic to the north-west of Western Australia. It is a spreading, shrubby, sometimes spindly shrub or tree with narrowly elliptic, leathery, slightly asymmetric phyllodes, spikes of golden yellow flowers and narrowly oblong, firmly papery pods.

== Description ==
Acacia hamersleyensis is a spreading, shrubby, sometimes spindly shrub or tree that typically grows to a height of 1.5–5 m (5–16 ft) and has glabrous branchlets, sometimes covered with a powdery bloom. The bark is dark brown to grey or black, smooth on higher branches but longitudinally fissured and fibrous near the base. Its phyllodes are leathery, narrowly elliptic, slightly asymmetric, mostly 80–140 mm (3.1–5.5 in) long and 7–15 mm (0.28–0.59 in) wide, glaucous to subglaucous, with fine veins, up to three more prominent than the rest. The pulvinus is pale orange, mostly 5–10 mm (0.20–0.39 in) long. The flowers are borne in one or two spikes in axils on peduncles 3–10 mm (0.12–0.39 in) long, the spikes 80–140 mm (3.1–5.5 in) long, 6–8 mm (0.24–0.31 in) wide with densely arranged golden yellow flowers. Flowering occurs from July to late August and the pods are narrowly oblong, up to 80 mm (3.1 in) long, 5–8 mm (0.20–0.31 in) wide, firmly papery and slightly wavy with a pale yellow aril.

== Taxonomy ==
Acacia hamersleyensis was first formally described in 1982 by Bruce Maslin in the journal Nuytsia from specimens collected on Rhodes Ridge in the Hamersley Range by Malcolm Trudgen in 1973. The specific epithet (hamersleyensis) refers to the fact that the species is known only from the Hamersley Range area.

== Distribution and habitat ==
Karijini wattle is mostly restricted to the Pilbara region of north-western Western Australia, mostly in the Hamersley Range around Newman in the east extending through Wittenoom and Paraburdoo in the west with small outlier populations in the Carnarvon Range in the Little Sandy Desert. It is usually grows along ridges and on the higher slopes of ranges, in rocky gullies and on scree slopes, occasionally in creeklines that flow down from the ranges. It grows in iron-rich skeletal soils over ironstone bed rock.

== Conservation status ==
Acacia hamersleyensis is listed as "not threatened" by the Government of Western Australia Department of Biodiversity, Conservation and Attractions.

== See also ==
- List of Acacia species
