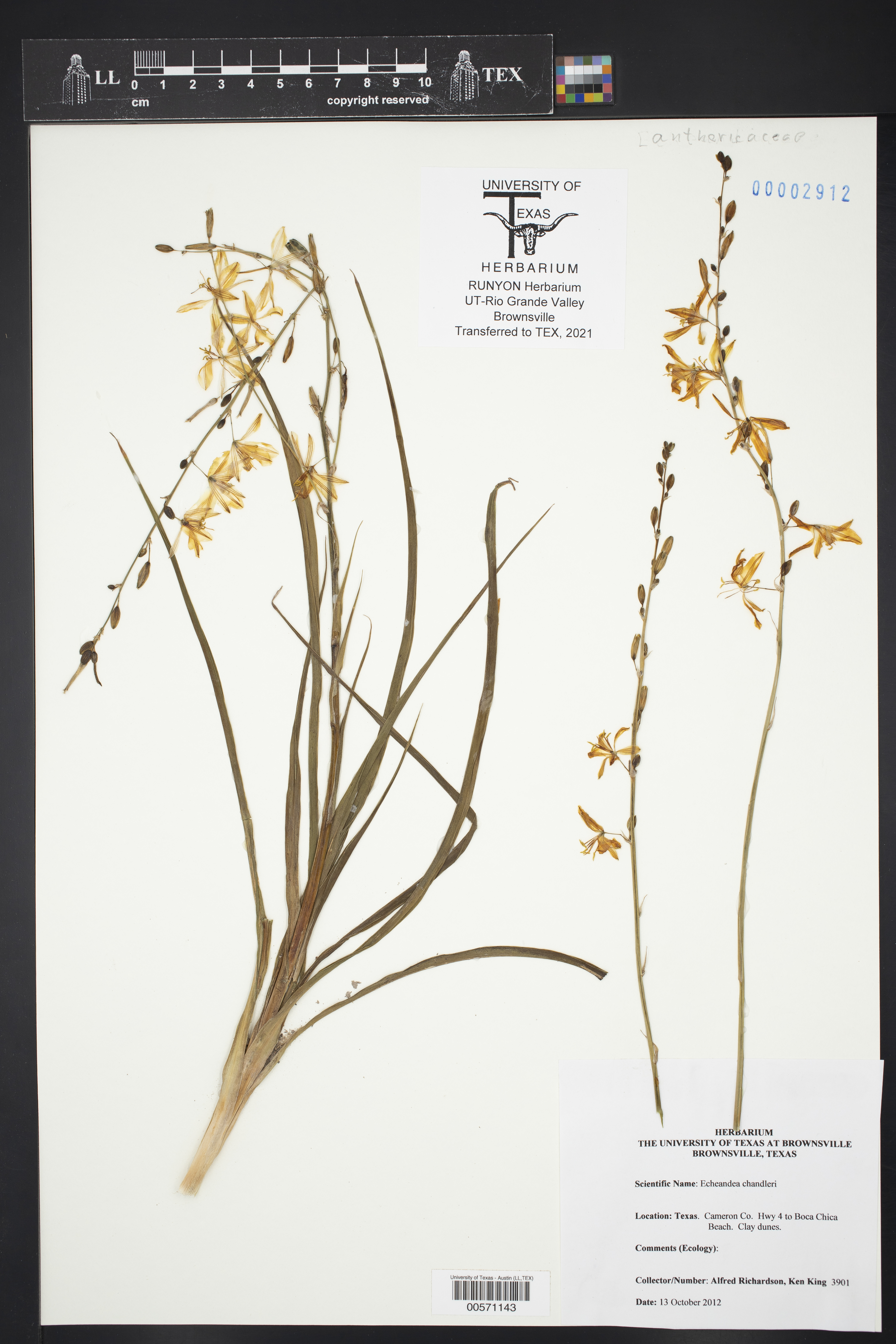

Conservation status
- Imperiled (NatureServe)

Scientific classification
- Kingdom: Plantae
- Clade: Tracheophytes
- Clade: Angiosperms
- Clade: Monocots
- Order: Asparagales
- Family: Asparagaceae
- Subfamily: Agavoideae
- Genus: Echeandia
- Species: E. chandleri

Binomial name
- Echeandia chandleri (Greenm. & C.H.Thomps.) Cruden

Synonyms
- Anthericum chandleri

= Echeandia chandleri =

Species of flowering plant

Echeandia chandleri, also known as Chandler's craglily or lila de los llanos, is an endangered species of flowering plant endemic to southern Texas in the United States and adjacent Tamaulipas, Mexico. It is estimated to exist in less than 25 distinct sites, with under 100,000 individual plants left in the wild.

== Description ==
This plant is an erect perennial herb with fleshy roots and flat, grass-like leaves. It grows to a height of 1-3 feet, 4 feet when including the flowering stalk. It blooms between May and November, producing flowers which are yellow or orange in color, and about 1 inch in diameter. The flowers grow in groups of 2-4 on short stalks.

== Distribution and habitat ==
Echeandia chandleri is confined to three Southern Texas counties (Cameron, Nueces, and Kleberg) and in parts of Tamaulipas, Mexico. Its native habitats in these areas are various open grasslands, chaparral, and brush. It prefers clay soils.

== Conservation ==
This species is threatened by grazing, agriculture, and housing development within its habitat. It is currently being cultivated for preservation purposes at the "Kika" de la Garza Plant Materials Center at Texas A & M University in Kingsville.
