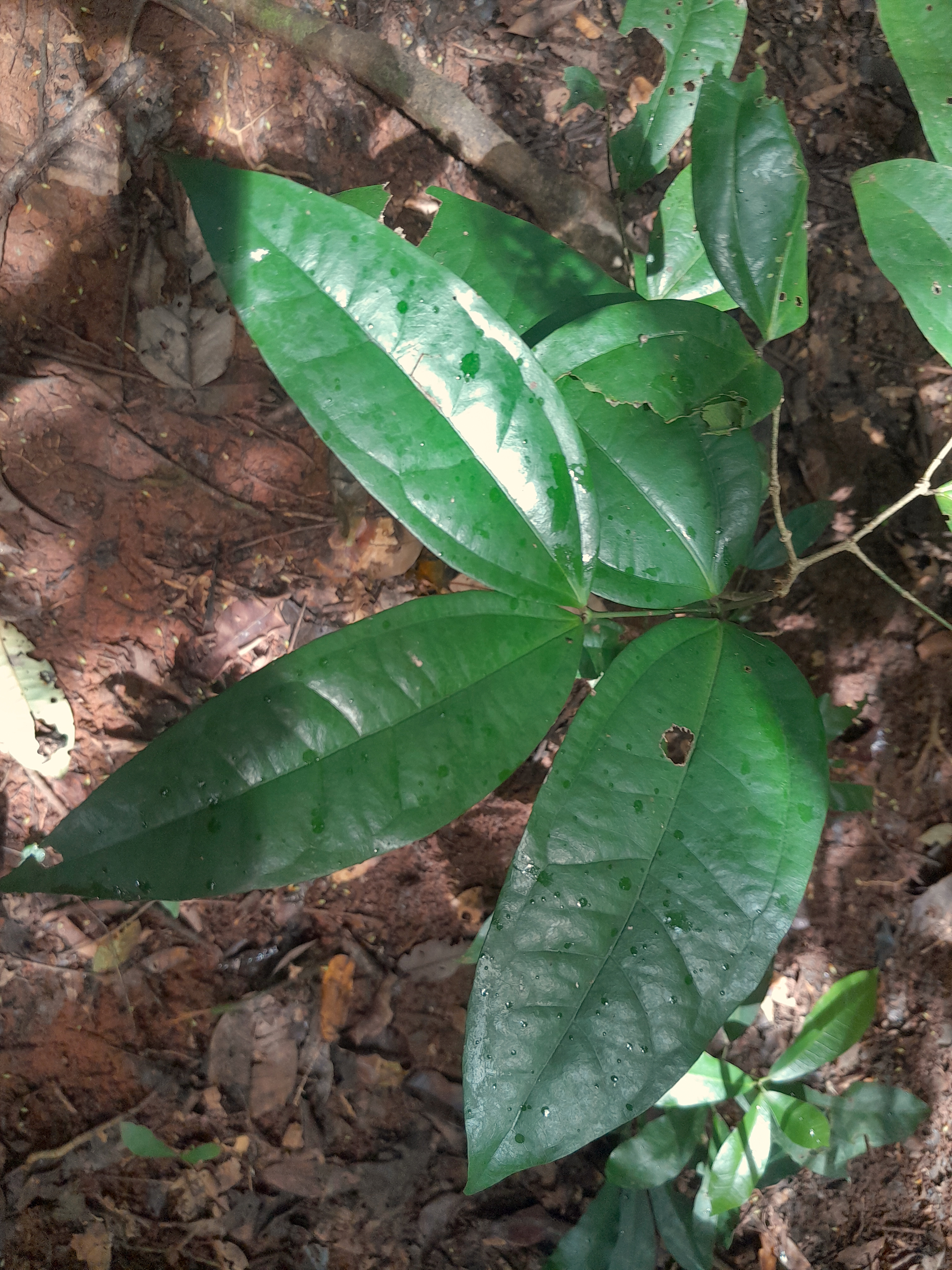
- On Mt. Whitfield, Cairns, Queensland

Conservation status
- Least Concern (NCA)

Scientific classification
- Kingdom: Plantae
- Clade: Tracheophytes
- Clade: Angiosperms
- Clade: Eudicots
- Clade: Asterids
- Order: Gentianales
- Family: Loganiaceae
- Genus: Strychnos
- Species: S. minor

Binomial name
- Strychnos minor Dennst.

Synonyms
- 27 synonyms: Strychnos bancroftiana F.M.Bailey; Strychnos barbata A.W.Hill; Strychnos beddomei C.B.Clarke; Strychnos bicirrhosa Lesch. ex Roxb.; Strychnos celebica Koord.; Strychnos cinnamophylla Gilg & Gilg-Ben.; Strychnos dubia A.W.Hill; Strychnos forbesii A.W.Hill; Strychnos hypogyna C.B.Clarke; Strychnos kerstingii Gilg & K.Schum.; Strychnos laurina Thwaites; Strychnos laurina var. thorelii A.W.Hill; Strychnos lenticellata A.W.Hill; Strychnos leuconeura Gilg & Gilg-Ben.; Strychnos ligustrina Zipp. ex Span.; Strychnos merrillii A.W.Hill; Strychnos micrantha Thwaites; Strychnos minor Blume; Strychnos minor var. thorelii (A.W.Hill) Tirel; Strychnos multiflora Benth.; Strychnos myriantha Gilg & Gilg-Ben.; Strychnos pycnoneura Gilg & Gilg-Ben.; Strychnos septemnervis C.B.Clarke; Strychnos septemnervis var. imberbis A.W.Hill; Strychnos silvicola A.W.Hill; Strychnos similis A.W.Hill; Strychnos thonningii Soler.

= Strychnos minor =

Species of flowering plant

Strychnos minor, commonly known as snakewood, is a species of plant in the family Loganiaceae found in tropical areas from India through southeast Asia to New Guinea and Australia. It was first described in 1818.

== Description ==
Strychnos minor is a woody vine growing up to 12 m (39 ft) long and a stem diameter up to 7 cm (2.8 in). The leaves are simple and arranged in opposite pairs on the stems. They have three conspicuous veins arising from the base of the leaf and numerous lateral veins between them in a ladder-like arrangement. Small flowers about 5 mm (0.2 in) long are produced in the leaf axils and are followed by yellow globular fruit about 2.5 cm (1.0 in) diameter, containing up to four flat pale brown seeds.

== Taxonomy ==
The species was first described by German botanist August Wilhelm Dennstedt in 1818, and published in Schlüssel zum Hortus Indicus Malabaricus, oder dreifaches Register zu diesem Werke.

== Distribution and habitat ==
This species is native to the following areas:

- Indian subcontinent – India, Bangladesh, Sri Lanka, Nicobar Islands
- Indo-China – Cambodia, Myanmar, Vietnam, Thailand, Malaya
- Malesia – Sumatera, Borneo, Sulawesi, Philippines, Lesser Sunda Islands, Maluku
- Papuasia – New Guinea, Bismarck Archipelago, Solomon Islands
- Australia – Tiwi Islands (Northern Territory), Queensland

It inhabits gallery forest and rainforest at altitudes from sea level to about 1,500 m (4,900 ft). In the Tiwi Islands it is associated with permanent springs and spring-fed water bodies.

== Conservation ==
This species is listed as least concern under the Queensland Government's Nature Conservation Act. In the Northern Territory it is classed as near threatened. As of May 2026, it has not been assessed by the International Union for Conservation of Nature (IUCN).
