= Acacia intorta =

Scientific classification
- Kingdom: Plantae
- Clade: Embryophytes
- Clade: Tracheophytes
- Clade: Spermatophytes
- Clade: Angiosperms
- Clade: Eudicots
- Clade: Rosids
- Order: Fabales
- Family: Fabaceae
- Subfamily: Caesalpinioideae
- Clade: Mimosoid clade
- Genus: Acacia
- Species: A. intorta

Binomial name
- Acacia intorta Maslin
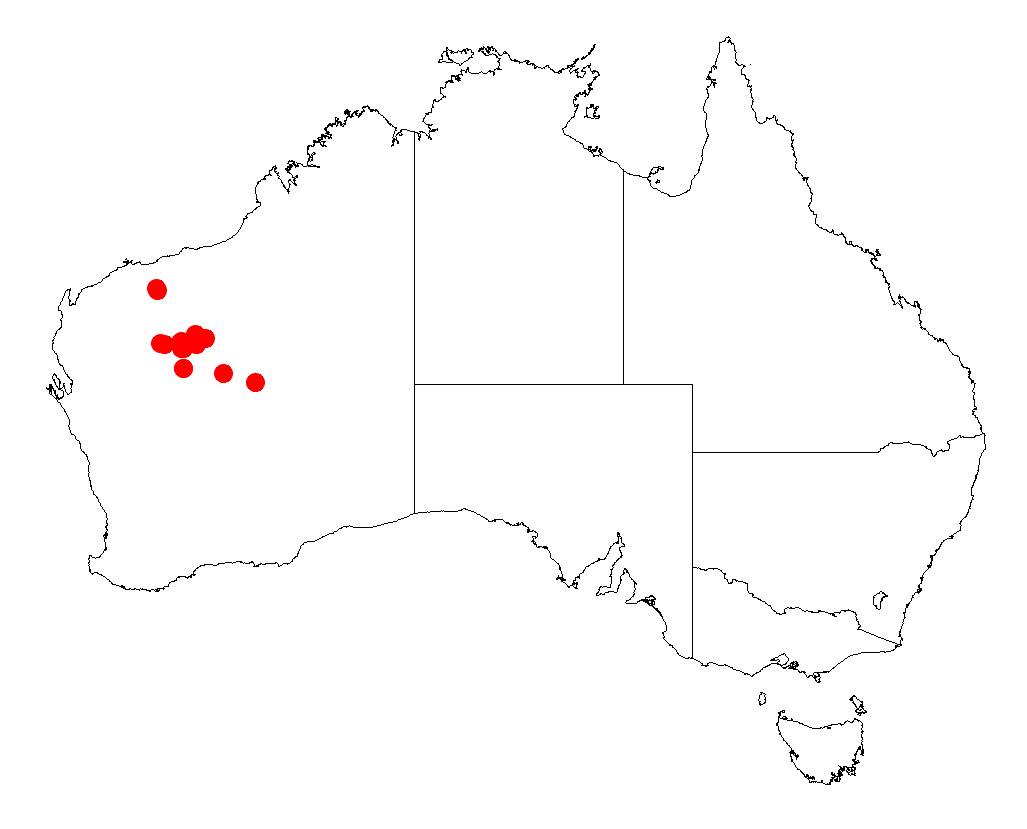
- Occurrence data from AVH

Synonyms
- Racosperma intortum (Maslin) Pedley

Species of legume

Acacia intorta is a species of flowering plant in the family Fabaceae and is endemic to inland areas in the north of Western Australia. It is a gnarled shrub or tree with fibrous, fissured grey bark, erect, rigid, sharply pointed phyllodes, spikes of golden yellow flowers and firmly leathery pods.

== Description ==
Acacia intorta is a gnarled shrub or tree that typically grows to a height of 1.5–3 m (5–10 ft), with its main branches twited and usually spreading horizontally. Its branchlets are glabrous and the phyllodes are erect, straight, usually terete or subterete, usually 50–100 mm (2.0–3.9 in) long and 1.5–2 mm (0.059–0.079 in) wide, rigid and sharply pointed. The flowers are golden yellow and loosely arranged in spikes 10–35 mm (0.39–1.38 in) long on a peduncle mostly 5–15 mm (0.20–0.59 in) long. Flowering occurs from April to mid-June and the pods are narrowly oblong, 40–90 mm (1.6–3.5 in) long, 5–8 mm (0.20–0.31 in) wide, firmly leathery, raised over, but not, or only slightly constricted between the seeds. The seeds are elliptic to oblong, 4–7 mm (0.16–0.28 in) long and dark brown with a small aril.

== Taxonomy ==
Acacia intorta was first formally described in 1983 by Bruce Maslin in the journal Nuytsia from specimens collected 30 km (19 mi) north of Tangadee Homestead in 1976. The specific epithet (intorta) means 'twisted' or 'turned around', referring to the branches.

== Distribution and habitat ==
This species of wattle grows in calcrete and alkaline clay soils on ridges, slopes and saline flats in the Gascoyne and Pilbara bioregions of inland northern Western Australia.

== Conservation status ==
Acacia intorta is listed as 'not threatened' by the Government of Western Australia Department of Biodiversity, Conservation and Attractions.

== See also ==
- List of Acacia species
