= Acacia eremaea =

Scientific classification
- Kingdom: Plantae
- Clade: Tracheophytes
- Clade: Angiosperms
- Clade: Eudicots
- Clade: Rosids
- Order: Fabales
- Family: Fabaceae
- Subfamily: Caesalpinioideae
- Clade: Mimosoid clade
- Genus: Acacia
- Species: A. eremaea

Binomial name
- Acacia eremaea C.R.P.Andrews
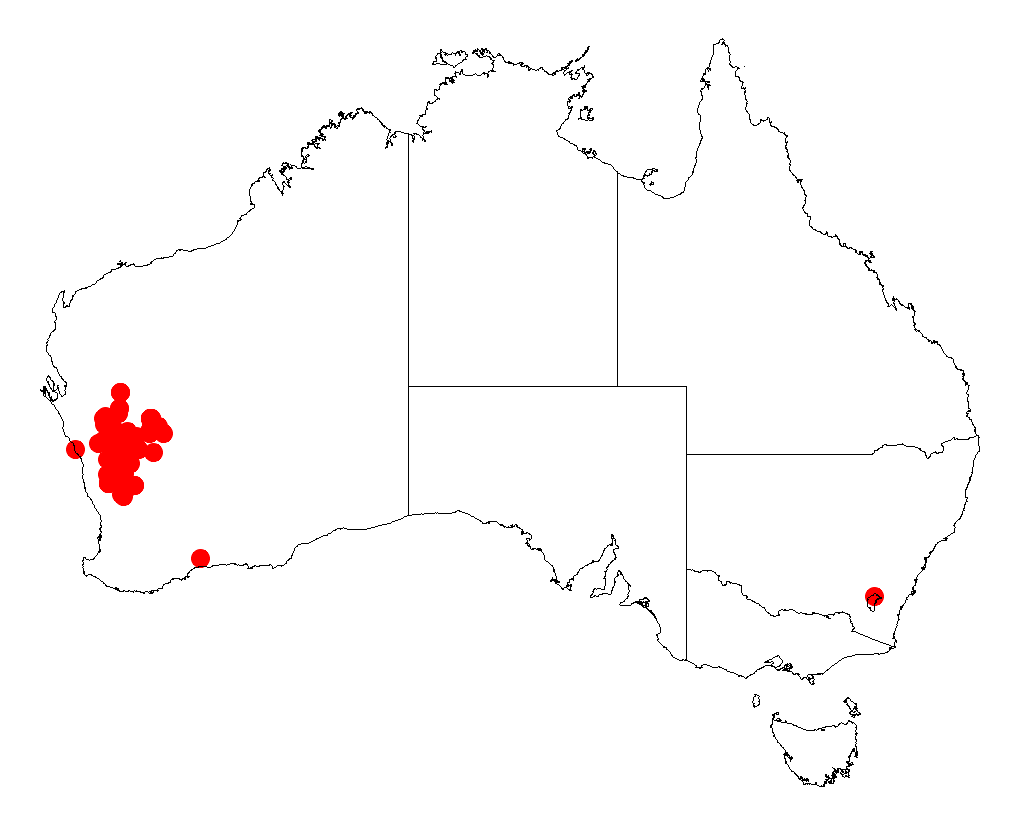
- Occurrence data from AVH

Synonyms
- Racosperma eremaeum (C.R.P.Andrews) Pedley

Species of legume

Habit near a salt lake, north of Ballidu

Acacia eremaea is a species of flowering plant in the family Fabaceae and is endemic to the west of Western Australia. It is a dense shrub or tree with ribbed, terete branchlets, erect, narrowly elliptic to elliptic phyllodes, spherical heads of golden yellow flowers, and linear, leathery pods strongly raised over the seeds.

== Description ==
Acacia eremaea is a dense shrub or tree that typically grows to a height of 1.2–4 m (3 ft 11 in – 13 ft 1 in) and has rough, deeply fissured bark and terete, ribbed branchlets. Its phyllodes are erect, narrowly elliptic to elliptic, straight to shallowly curved, sharply pointed, 60–120 mm (2.4–4.7 in) long and 6–17 mm (0.24–0.67 in) wide. There are closely parallel veins, of which about three are typically slightly raised. The flowers are borne in two to four spherical heads in axils on hairy peduncles 5–17 mm (0.20–0.67 in) long. Each head is 5.5–7.5 mm (0.22–0.30 in) in diameter with 54 to 85 golden yellow flowers. Flowering occurs from July to October and the pods are leathery, linear, straight to slightly curved, up to 90 mm (3.5 in) long, 5–7 mm (0.20–0.28 in) wide and strongly raised over the seeds. The seeds are egg-shaped, 5–6 mm (0.20–0.24 in) long, glossy brown, the aril not prominent.

== Taxonomy ==
Acacia eremaea was first formally described by the botanist Cecil Rollo Payton Andrews in the Journal of the West Australian Natural History Society from specimens he collected near Cue in 1903. The specific epithet (eremaea) means 'lonely' or 'solitary', hence 'found in a desert or arid region'.

== Distribution and habitat ==
This species of wattle grows on clay loam flats, often near salt lakes in tall shrubland and low woodland from around Boolardy Station and Cue towards Wongan Hills, in the Avon Wheatbelt, Geraldton Sandplains, Murchison and Yalgoo bioregions in the west of Western Australia.

== Conservation status ==
Acacia eremaea is listed as 'Not threatened' by the Government of Western Australia Department of Biodiversity, Conservation and Attractions.

== See also ==
- List of Acacia species
