= Utrecht University Botanic Gardens =

Botanical gardens of Utrecht University, the Netherlands

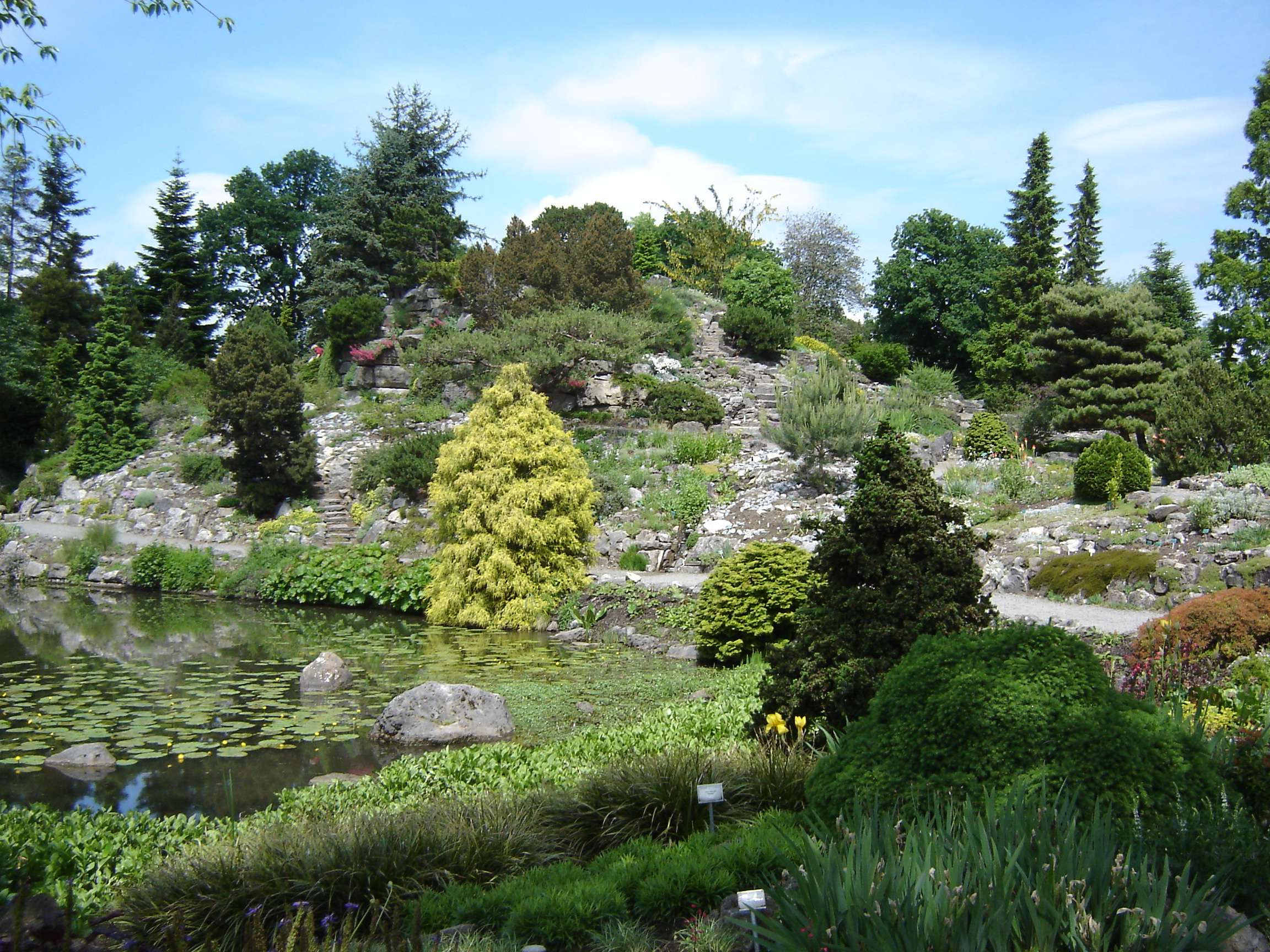
Main garden at Fort Hoofddijk, De Uithof, Utrecht

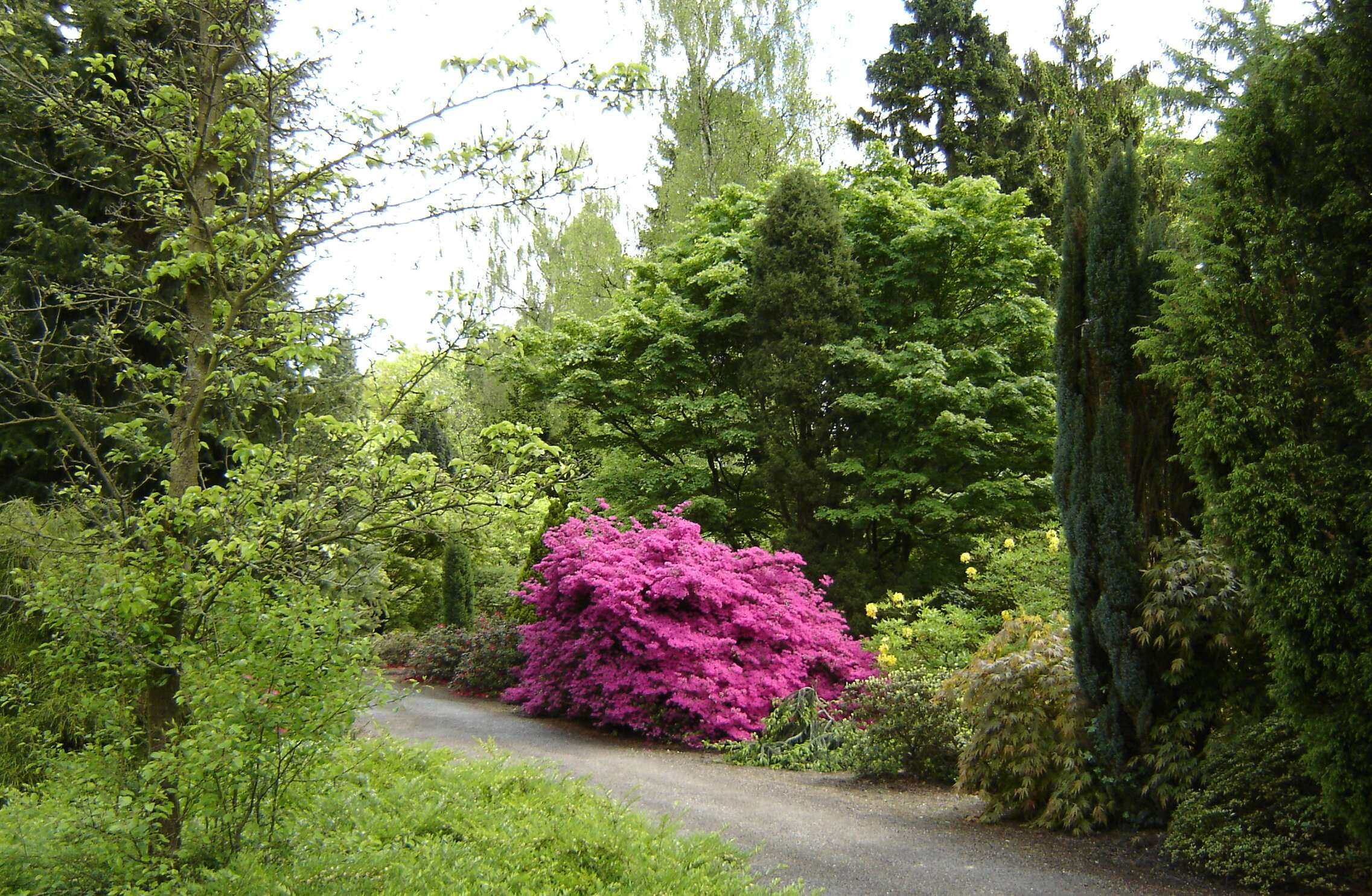
Von Gimborn Arboretum, Doorn

The Utrecht University Botanic Gardens have consisted of two locations since 1987: the main Botanical Garden Fort Hoofddijk (52.0883°N 5.1725°E) in De Uithof, Utrecht, and the Von Gimborn Arboretum (52.0325°N 5.3093°E) in nearby Doorn. Both locations are open to the public.

== History ==
The history of living plant collections of Utrecht University dates back to the 17th century. The first botanical garden for medicine of the university was founded in Utrecht in 1639, three years after the establishment of the university itself. Around 1723 the collection moved to another location within the old city, which still exists as the museum garden of the University Museum, known as Oude Hortus (old university garden). Here around 1730 Ginkgo biloba was planted for the first time in Europe. In 1920 Cantonspark in Baarn became another part of the university gardens, with a rock garden and thematic beds. In 1963 Utrecht University acquired the land at Fort Hoofddijk, one of the forts of the New Dutch Waterline, situated in Utrecht Science Park (also known as De Uithof), the modern campus of the university on the eastern outskirts of the city of Utrecht.

In 1964 the university bought the Sandwijck buitenplaats in nearby De Bilt, where greenhouses and a nursery were built, and in 1966 it acquired Von Gimborn Arboretum in Doorn. In 1964-1974 the rocks from the old rock garden in Cantonspark and additional 2100 tons of rocks from Ardennes were laid on the hill of Fort Hoofddijk in De Uithof, Utrecht, in order to build the new rock garden, which has become one of the largest in Europe. In the 1970s systematic beds were laid down there as well, and in the 1980s the new complex of greenhouses was constructed. In 1987 the collections of Oude Hortus, Cantonspark and Sandwijck were transferred to Fort Hoofddijk, which thus became the main location of the botanical gardens. A new butterfly house was installed in a greenhouse in 2019.
