= Von Gimborn Arboretum =

Living collection of woody plants in the Netherlands

Coordinates: 52°2′0″N 5°18′30″E

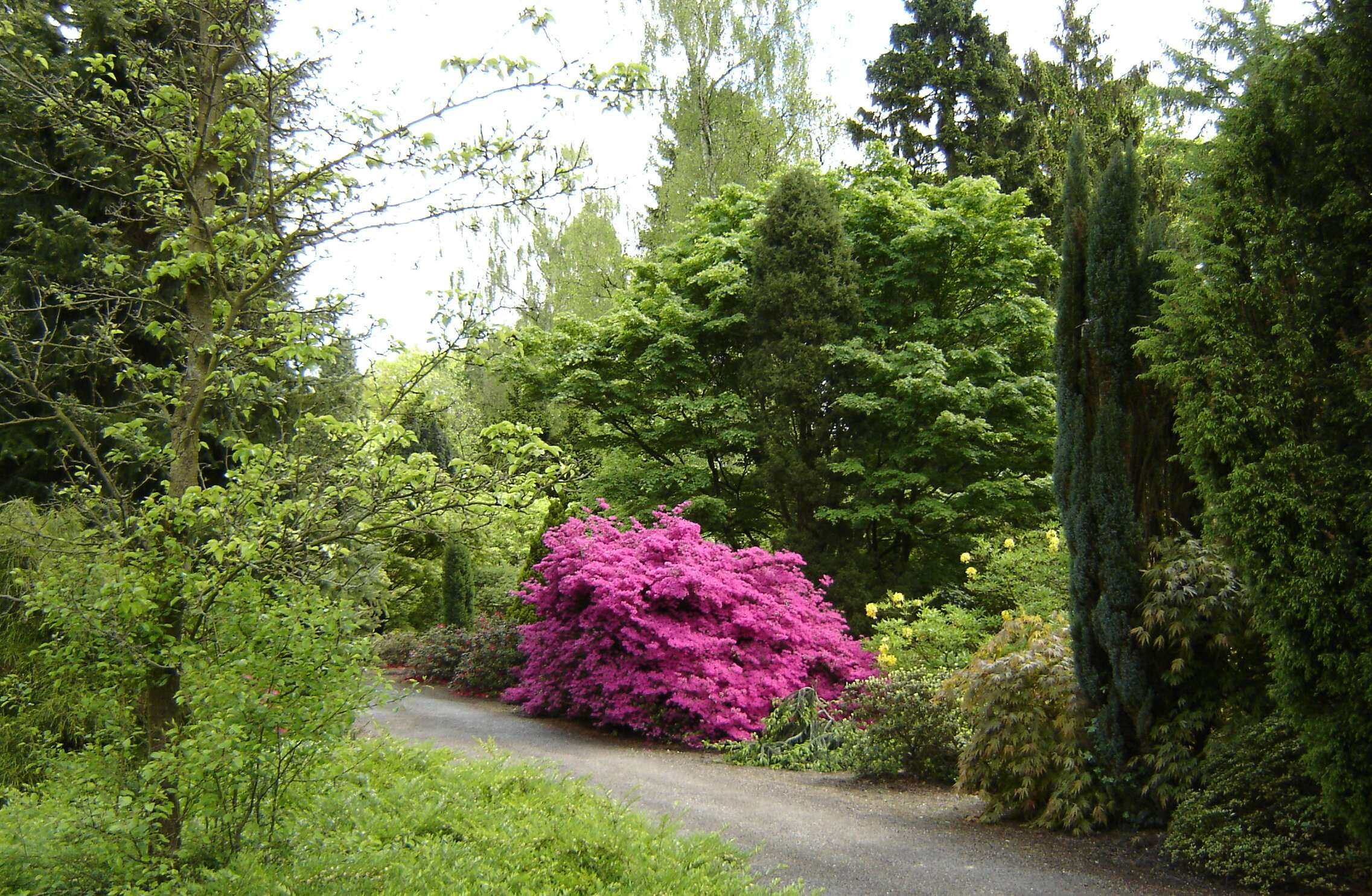

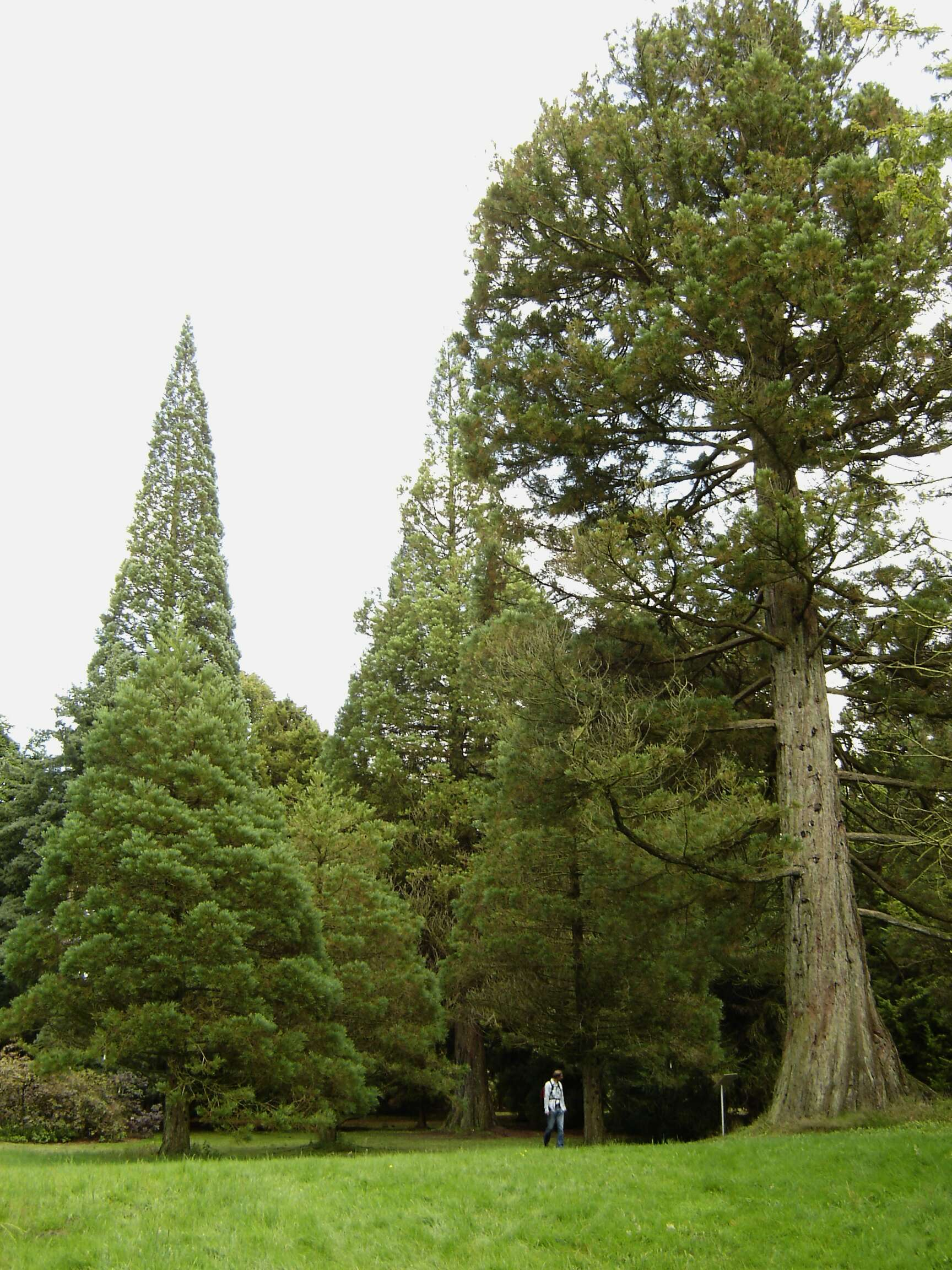

Von Gimborn Arboretum is a large living collection of woody plants in the Netherlands.The arboretum is situated in Doorn, province of Utrecht, about 25 km to the east from the city of Utrecht, and together with its nursery currently occupies an area of 27 ha. It is named after its founder, German ink manufacturer Max Th. Von Gimborn (1872–1964), which started it in 1924 as a private collection of conifers and ericaceous plants. The collection was laid down as a 23 ha landscape garden designed by Gerard Bleeker. It is still one of the largest conifer collections in Western Europe, though now it contains many other trees and shrubs as well. It holds national plant collections of conifers (particularly Tsuga), Ericaceae (and Rhododendron in particular), Aceraceae, Betulaceae, Euonymus, Fraxinus, Laburnum, Magnolia and Syringa. A number of cultivars of woody plants originate there. The arboretum is open to the public daily for a small fee.
