= Marshall Conring Johnston =

American botanist (born 1930)

Marshall Conring Johnston (born May 10, 1930) is an American botanist who made several explorations in Mexico and specialized in plants in the family Gesneriaceae and Rhamnaceae.

Johnston was born in San Antonio in the family of Theodore Harris Johnston and Lucile Mary Conring. He went on his first botanical expeditions to Mexico while still in high school during 1945–1947. On those trips he visited the northern Mexican states of Tamaulipas, Nuevo Leon, Coahuila, Durango, and Zacatecas. From 1972–1974 he made trips to Chihuahua, concentrating on desert flora. These early 1970s trips resulted in the bulk of his botanic collection. Marshal participated in the creation of the books Flora of Texas, Flora of North America, and Flora Neotropica. Johnston was also a professor at the University of Texas at Austin.

== Plant namesakes ==
- Marshalljohnstonia (genus), Henrickson, 1976
- Colubrina johnstonii, T.Wendt, 1983
- Crataegus johnstonii, J.B.Phipps, 1997
- Euphorbia johnstonii, Mayfield, 1991
- Frankenia johnstonii, Correll, 1966
- Hedeoma johnstonii, R.S.Irving, 1977
- Karwinskia johnstonii, R.Fernández, 1988
- Matelea johnstonii, Shinners, 1964
- Nerisyrenia johnstonii, J.D.Bacon, 1978
- Phacelia marshall-johnstonii, N.D.Atwood & Pinkava, 1977
- Portulaca johnstonii, Henrickson, 1981
- Johnstonalia, Tortosa, 2006

== Works ==
- Correll, D. S.; Johnston, M. C. (1970). Manual of the Vascular Plants of Texas. College Station, TX: Texas Research Foundation.
- Cheatham, Scooter; Johnston, M. C.; Marshall, Lynn (1995). The Useful Wild Plants of Texas, the Southeastern and Southwestern United States, the Southern Plains, and Northern Mexico. Austin, TX: Useful Wild Plants Inc. ISBN 978-1-8872-9201-6.
- Johnston, L. A.; Johnston, M. C. (1999). Rhamnus. New York: New York Botanical Garden. ISBN 978-0-8932-7209-8.
