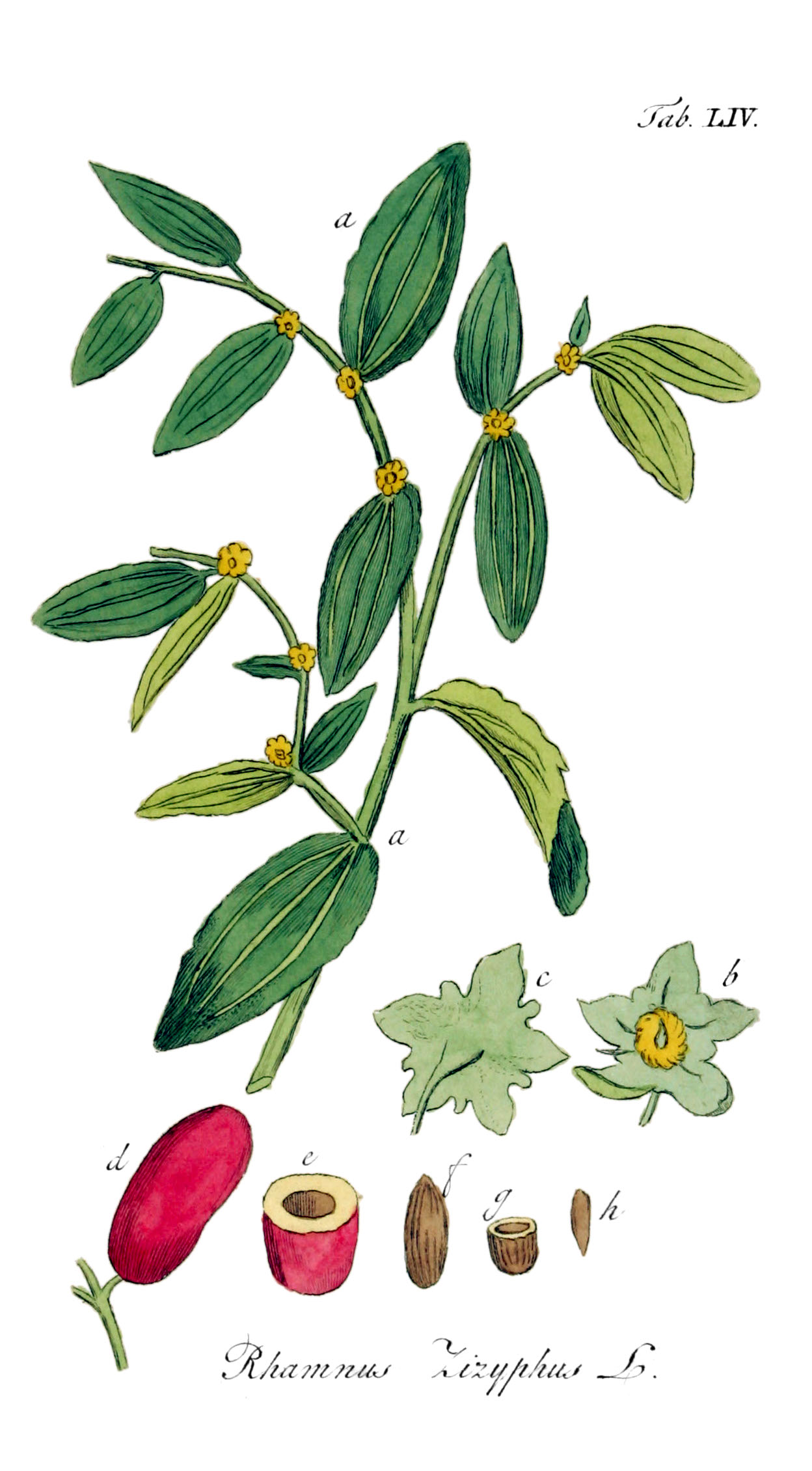
- Ziziphus jujuba, by Adolphus Ypey

Scientific classification
- Kingdom: Plantae
- Clade: Tracheophytes
- Clade: Angiosperms
- Clade: Eudicots
- Clade: Rosids
- Order: Rosales
- Family: Rhamnaceae
- Tribe: Paliureae
- Genus: Ziziphus; Mill. (1754)

Type species
- Ziziphus jujuba Mill. (1768), nom. cons.

Species
- 68; see text

Synonyms
- Chloroxylum P.Browne (1756); Jububa Bubani (1897); Mansana J.F.Gmel. (1791); Zizyphon St.-Lag. (1880), orth. var.

= Ziziphus =

Genus of shrubsand trees

Ziziphus (/ˈzɪzɪfəs/) is a genus of spiny shrubs and small trees in the buckthorn family, Rhamnaceae. It includes 68 species native to tropical and subtropical parts of Africa, Eurasia, Australia and South America. The leaves are alternate, entire, with three prominent basal veins, and often aromatic. The flowers are small, inconspicuous yellow-green. The fruit is an edible drupe, often very sweet and sugary, reminiscent of a date in texture and flavour.

Well known, commonly cultivated species i.e. jujubes include the Chinese jujube (Ziziphus jujuba) of China and Indian jujube (Ziziphus mauritiana) spread from western Africa to India; other species like Ziziphus spina-christi from southwestern Asia and Ziziphus lotus from the Mediterranean region are significant to local cultures within their habitats.

== Etymology ==
This genus was made in 1754 by Philip Miller after he separated some species from the Rhamnus genus that Carl Linnaeus placed in his book Species Plantarum. Its name is Latin and derived from Greek ζίζυφον zízyphon which is identified with Ziziphus vulgaris, where it is presumed to have been borrowed from another language, perhaps from zizfum or zizafun, the Persian word for Z. lotus.

== Ecology ==
Ziziphus species are used as food plants by the larvae of some Lepidoptera species including Bucculatrix zizyphella, which feeds exclusively on the genus, and Endoclita malabaricus.

Species are distributed throughout the world in tropical and warm temperate areas, from rain forests to deserts. Some species are evergreen, others are winter or drought deciduous.

Species adapted to dry climates are smaller and have oleifera cells that produce a fragrant aroma.

== Uses ==
The temperate Ziziphus jujuba (Chinese jujube) and the tropical Ziziphus mauritiana (Indian Jujube) are economically important fruit trees.

In traditional Chinese medicine (TCM), suan zao ren (Ziziphus jujuba) is considered to be sweet and sour in taste, and neutral in action. It is believed to nourish the heart yin, augment the liver blood, and calm the spirit (TCM medical terms). It is used to treat irritability, insomnia and heart palpitations.

== Mythology ==
The mythological lotus tree which occurs in Homer's Odyssey is often equated with Z. lotus.

== Species ==
68 species are accepted.

- Ziziphus abyssinica Hochst. ex A.Rich. – dry zones of tropical Africa
- Ziziphus affinis Hemsl.
- Ziziphus andamanica Bhandari & Bhansali
- Ziziphus angustifolia (Miq.) Hatus. ex Steenis
- Ziziphus apetala Hook.f. ex M.A.Lawson
- Ziziphus attopensis Pierre
- Ziziphus borneensis Merr.
- Ziziphus brunoniana C.B.Clarke ex A.W.Hill
- Ziziphus budhensis Bhattarai & Pathak – Central Nepal
- Ziziphus calophylla Wall.
- Ziziphus cambodiana Pierre – Cambodia, Laos, Vietnam
- Ziziphus colombiana Suess. & Overkott
- Ziziphus cotinifolia Reissek
- Ziziphus crebrivenosa C.B.Rob.
- Ziziphus cumingiana Merr.
- Ziziphus djamuensis Lauterb.
- Ziziphus elegans Wall.
- Ziziphus fungii Merr.
- Ziziphus funiculosa Buch.-Ham. ex M.A.Lawson
- Ziziphus glabrata (B.Heyne ex Schult.) B.Heyne ex Wight & Arn.
- Ziziphus globularis Wall.
- Ziziphus guaranitica Malme
- Ziziphus hajarensis Duling, Ghaz. & Prend.
- Ziziphus hamur Engl.
- Ziziphus havilandii Ridl.
- Ziziphus hoaensis Pierre
- Ziziphus horrida Roth
- Ziziphus horsfieldii Miq.
- Ziziphus hutchinsonii Merr. – Philippines
- Ziziphus incurva Roxb.
- Ziziphus javanensis Blume
- Ziziphus jujuba Mill. – Jujube
- Ziziphus kunstleri King
- Ziziphus laui Merr.
- Ziziphus leucodermis (Baker) O.Schwartz
- Ziziphus linnaei M.A.Lawson
- Ziziphus lotus (L.) Lam. – Mediterranean region
- Ziziphus mairei Dode
- Ziziphus mauritiana Lam. – widespread through Old World tropics and subtropics
- Ziziphus melastomoides Pittier
- Ziziphus montana W.W.Smith
- Ziziphus mucronata Willd. buffalo thorn – southern Africa
- Ziziphus nummularia (Burm.f.) Wight & Arn. – Thar Desert of India and Pakistan
- Ziziphus oenopolia (L.) Mill.
- Ziziphus otanesii Merr.
- Ziziphus oxyphylla Edgew.
- Ziziphus papuana Lauterb.
- Ziziphus pernettyoides Ridl.
- Ziziphus poilanei Tardieu
- Ziziphus pubescens Oliv.
- Ziziphus pubinervis Rehder
- Ziziphus quadrilocularis F.Muell. – northern Australia
- Ziziphus ridleyana Rasingam & Karthig.
- Ziziphus rivularis Codd
- Ziziphus robertsoniana Beentje
- Ziziphus rubiginosa D.G.Long & Rae
- Ziziphus rugosa Lam.
- Ziziphus spina-christi (L.) Desf.
- Ziziphus subquinquenervia Miq.
- Ziziphus suluensis Merr.
- Ziziphus talanai (Blanco) Merr. – Philippines
- Ziziphus timoriensis DC.
- Ziziphus trinervis (Cav.) Poir.
- Ziziphus truncata Blatt. & Hallb.
- Ziziphus williamii Bhandari & Bhansali
- Ziziphus xiangchengensis Y.L.Chen & P.K.Chou
- Ziziphus xylopyrus (Retz.) Willd.
- Ziziphus zeyheriana Sond.

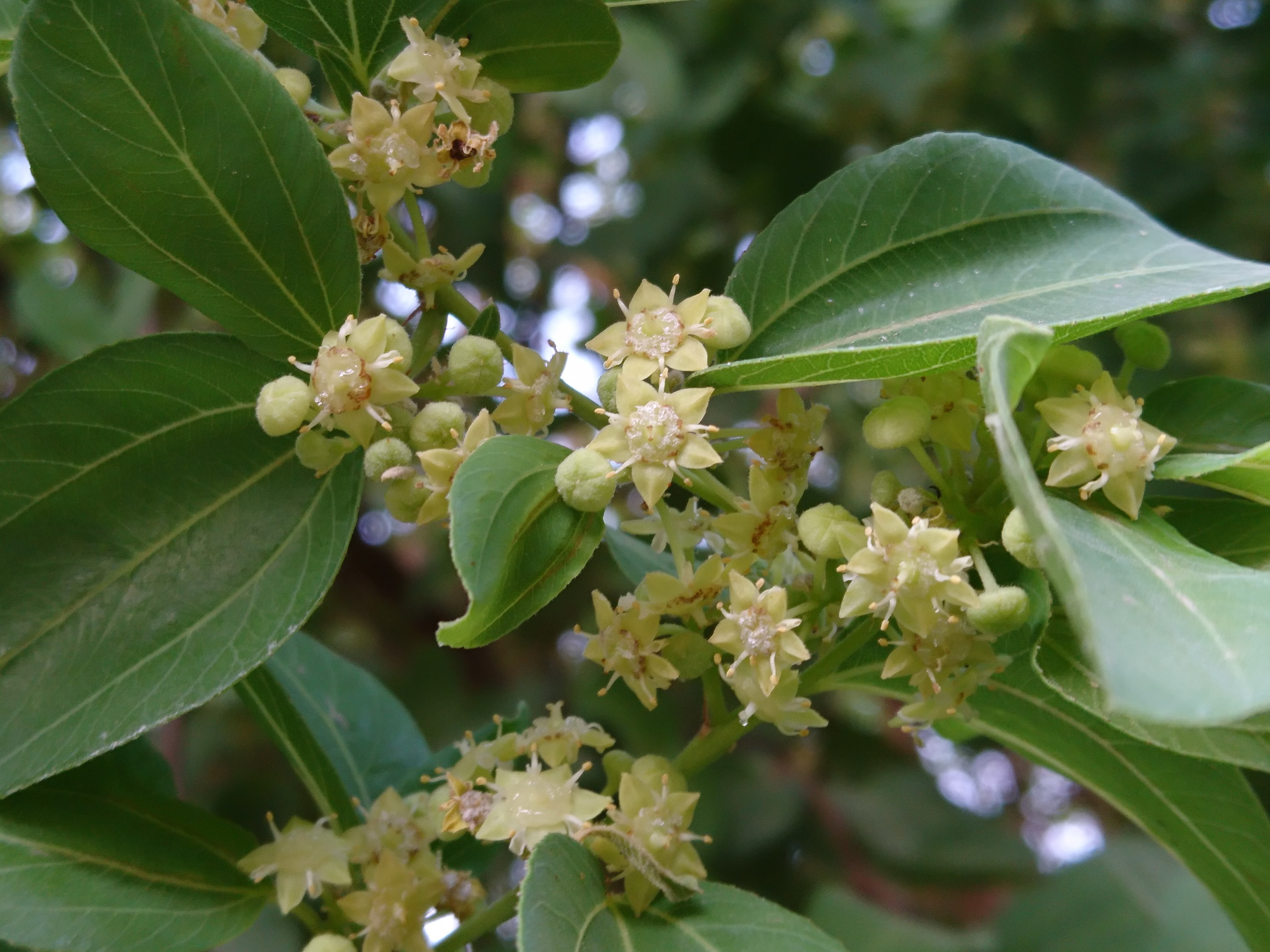
Ziziphus Blossom in Behbahan, Iran

Other list sources:

=== Formerly placed here ===
- Condaliopsis obtusifolia (Hook. ex Torr. & A.Gray) Suess. – Lotebush (as Ziziphus obtusifolia (Hook. ex Torr. & A.Gray) A.Gray)
- Pseudoziziphus celata (Judd & D.W.Hall) Hauenschild (as Ziziphus celata Judd & Hall)
- Pseudoziziphus parryi (Torr.) Hauenschild – Parry's Jujube (as Ziziphus parryi Torr.)
- Sarcomphalus mistol (Griseb.) Hauenschild (as Ziziphus mistol Griseb.)
- Ziziphus lloydi A.Gray

=== Fossil species ===
- † Ziziphus hyperboreus Heer (Greenland, Eocene fossil)
- † Ziziphus wyomingianis Berry (Tipperary, Wind River Basin Wyoming, USA, Eocene fossil)

† = Extinct

== Gallery ==
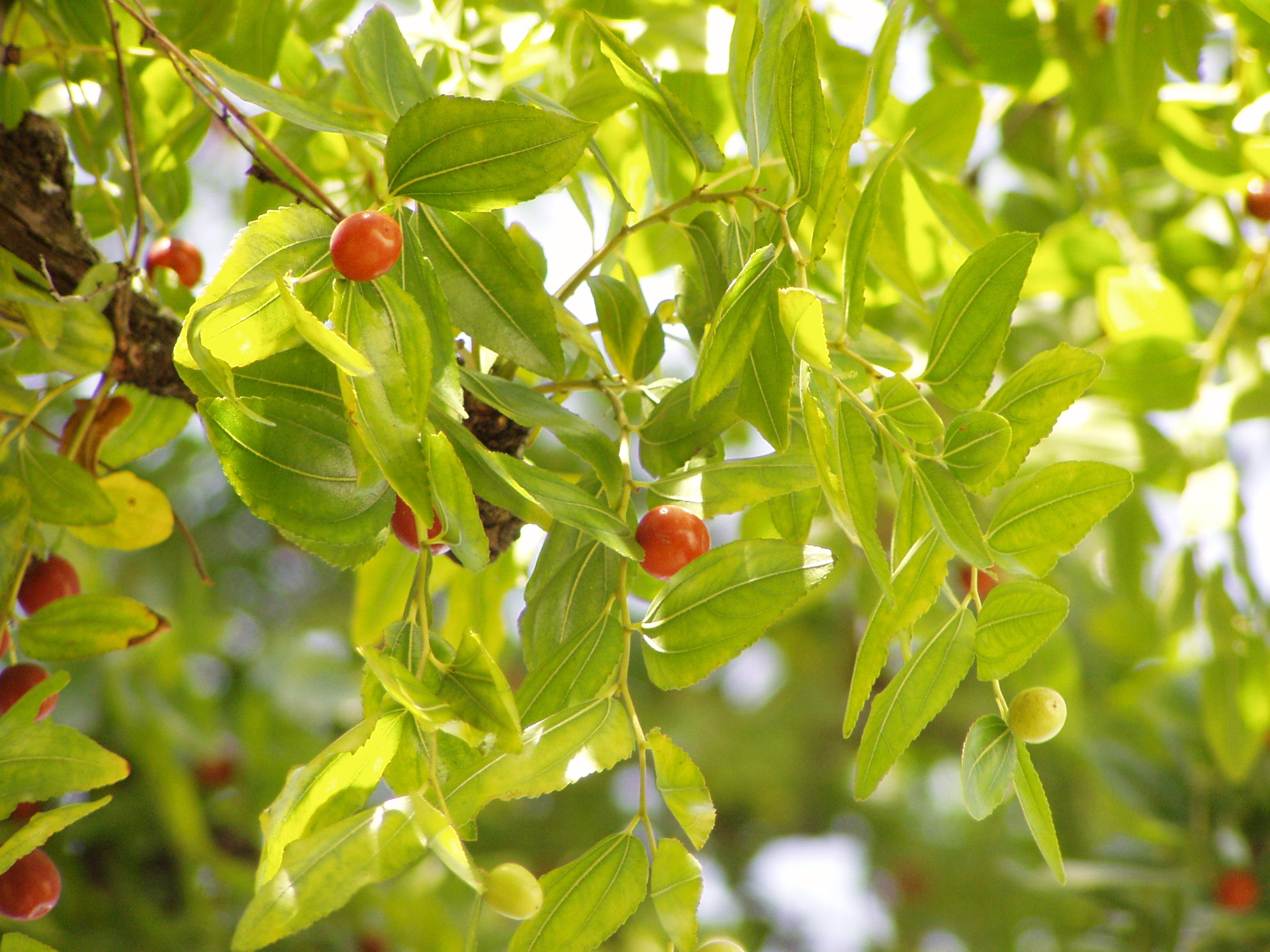
Ziziphus jujuba foliage

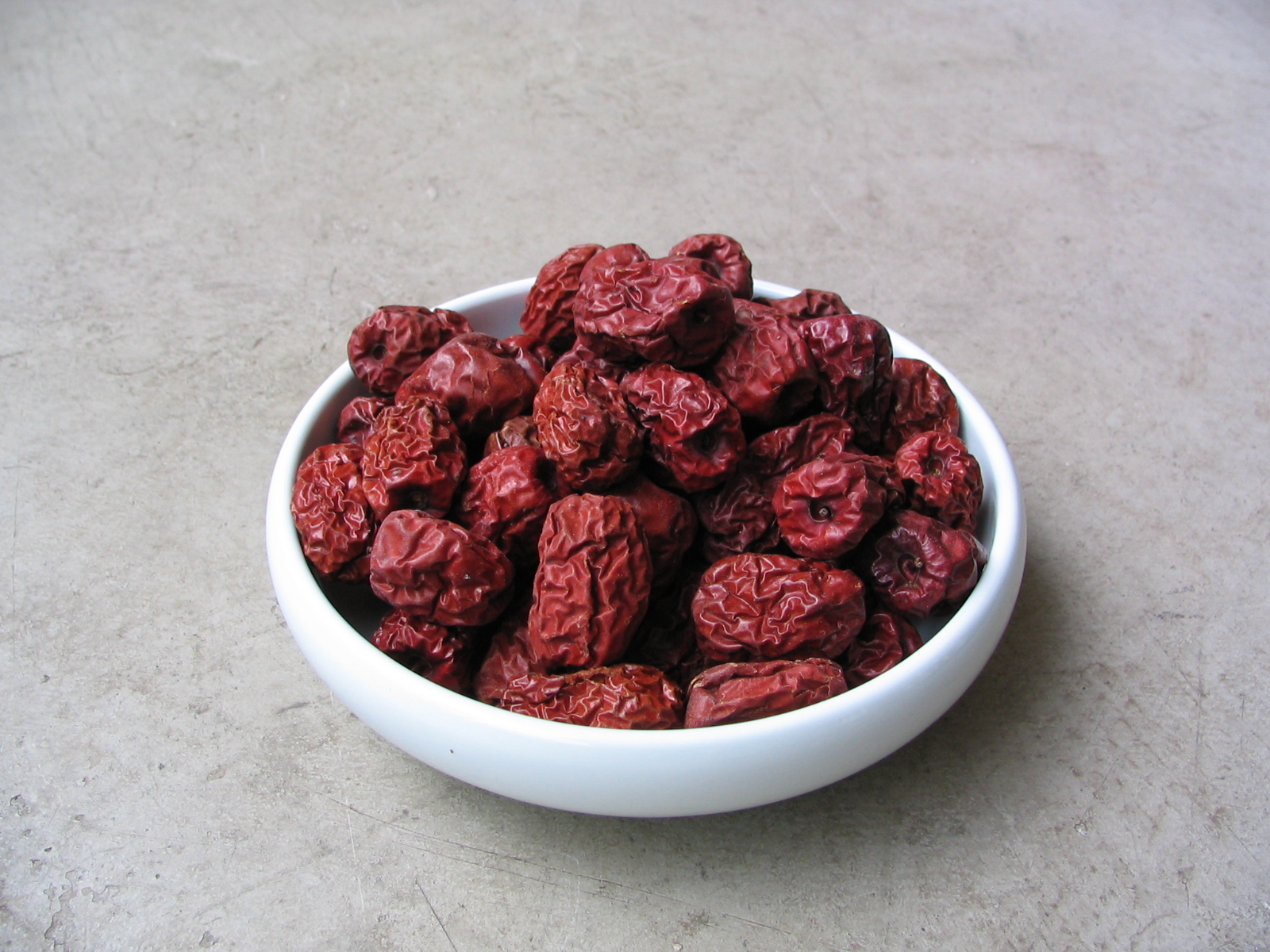
Dried fruits (azufaifas) in southern Spain of Ziziphus jujuba

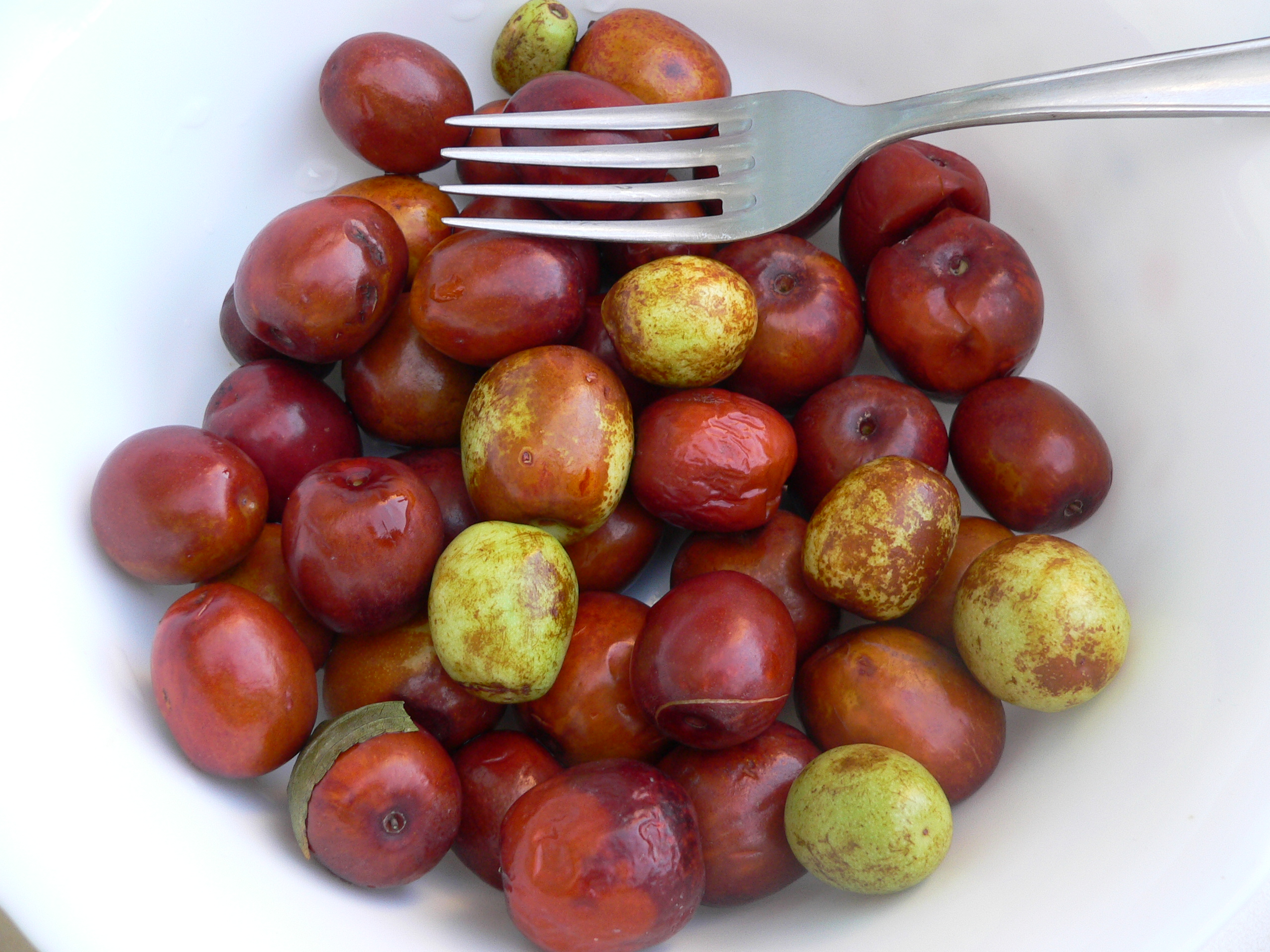
Azufaifas from Almería

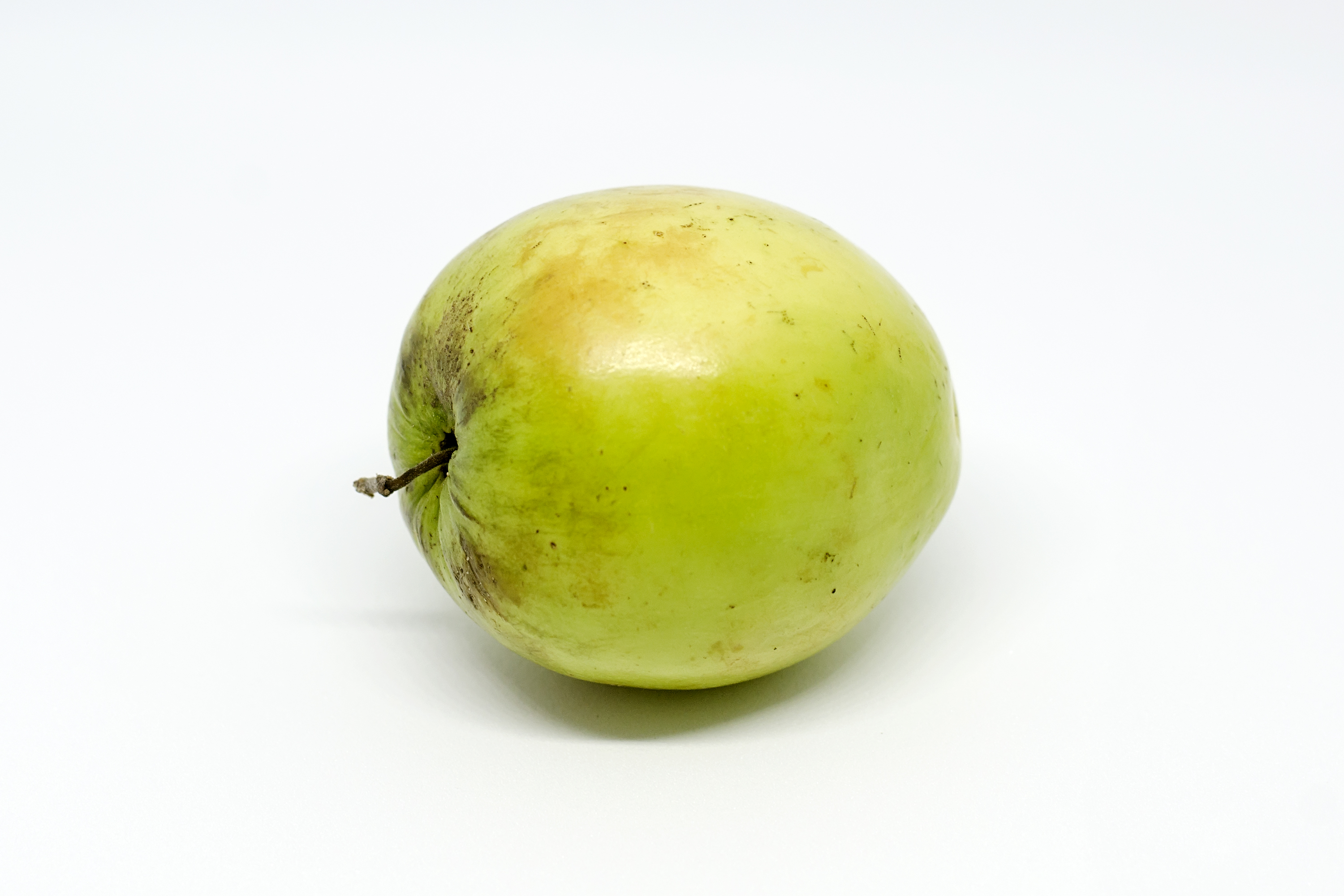
Ziziphus mauritiana

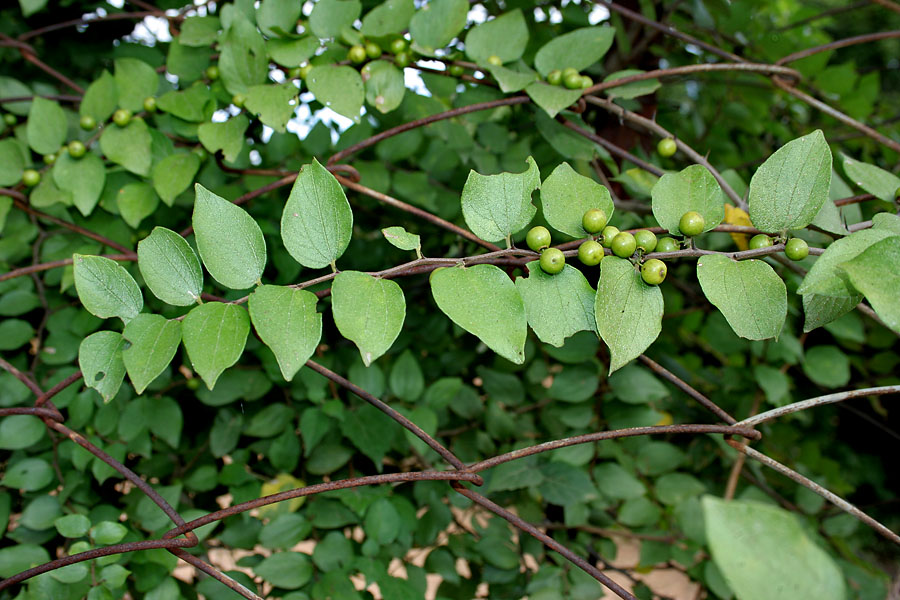
Ziziphus oenoplia in Shamirpet, Rangareddy district, Andhra Pradesh, India

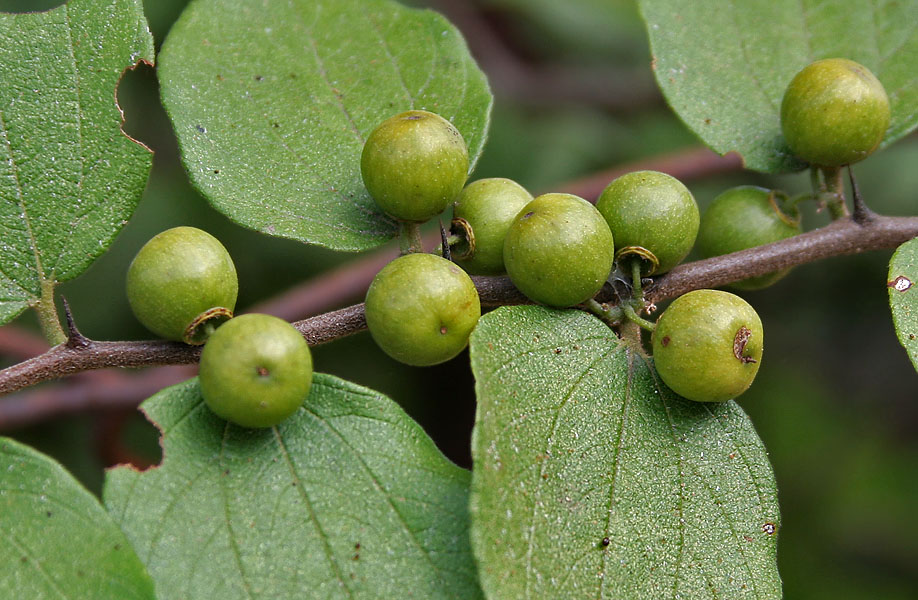
Ziziphus oenoplia in Shamirpet, Rangareddy district, Andhra Pradesh, India

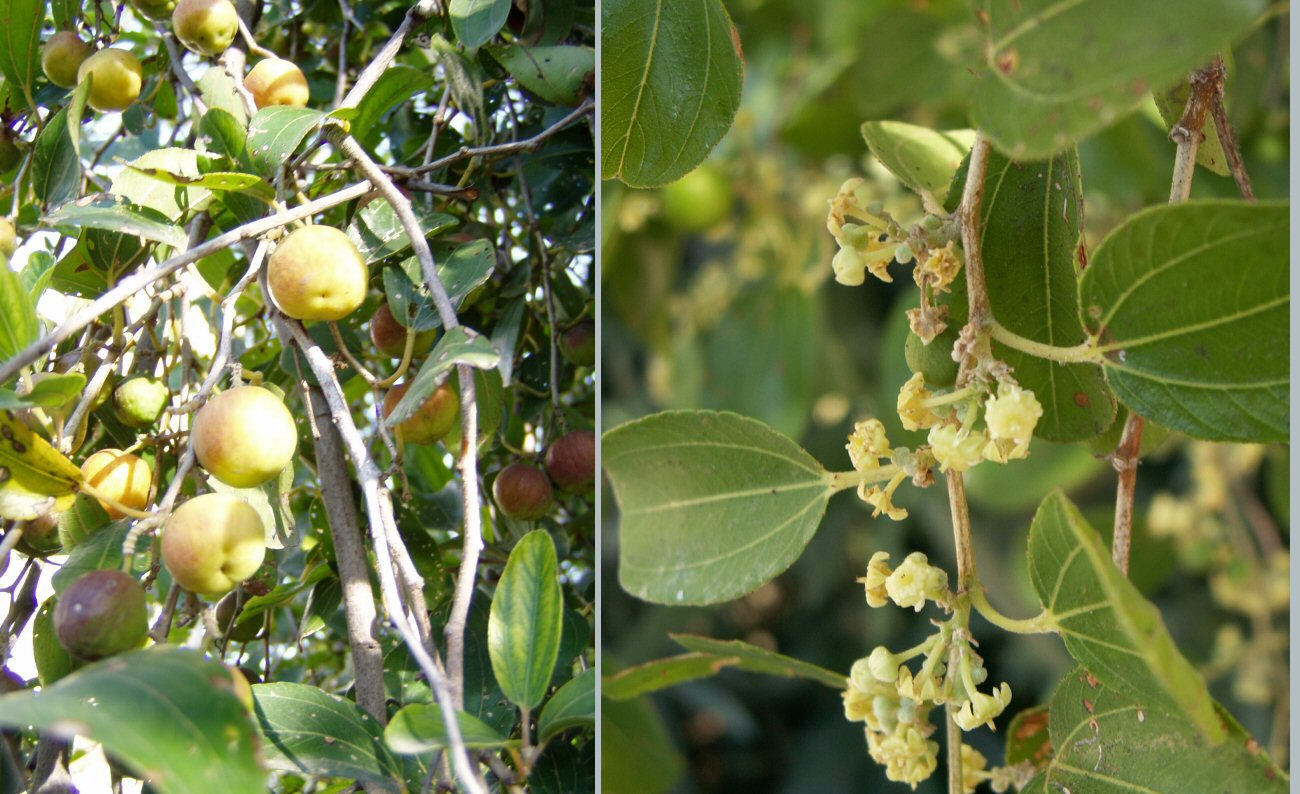
Ziziphus spina-christi

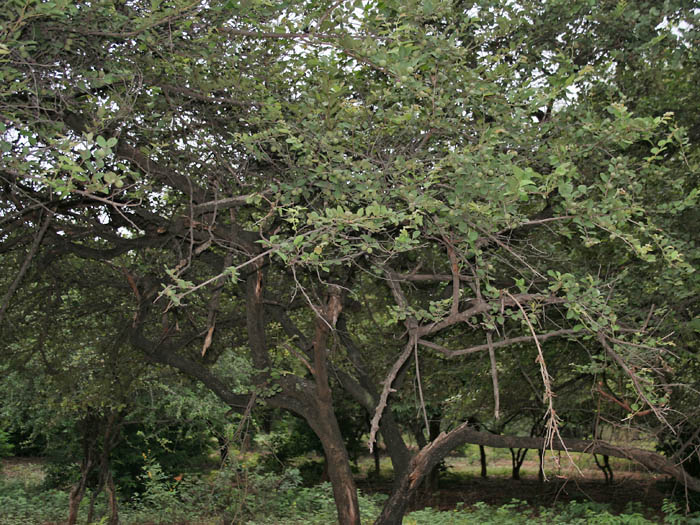
Ziziphus xylopyrus in Hyderabad, India

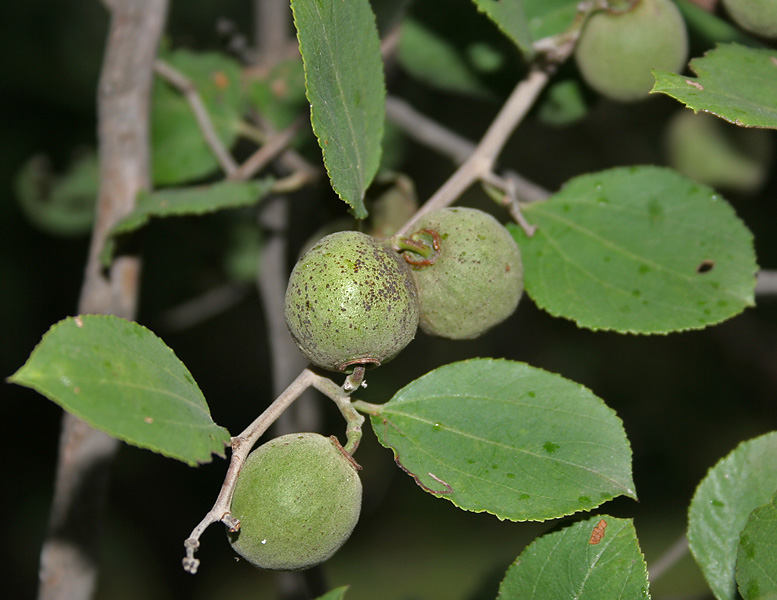
Ziziphus xylopyrus in Hyderabad, India

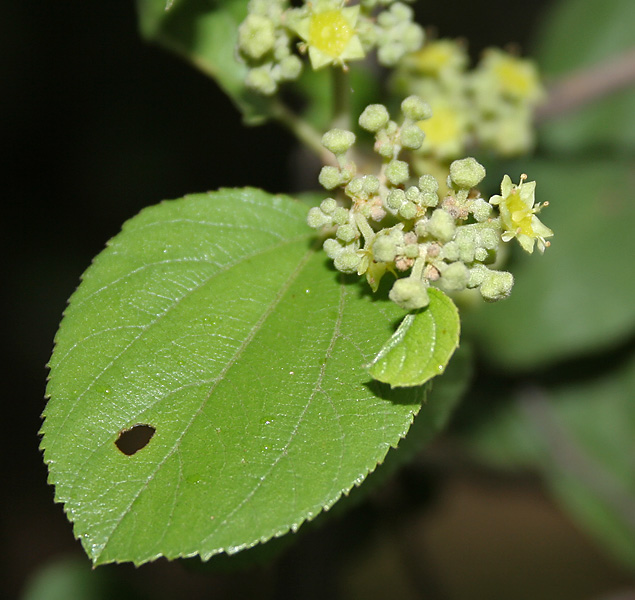
Ziziphus xylopyrus in Hyderabad, India

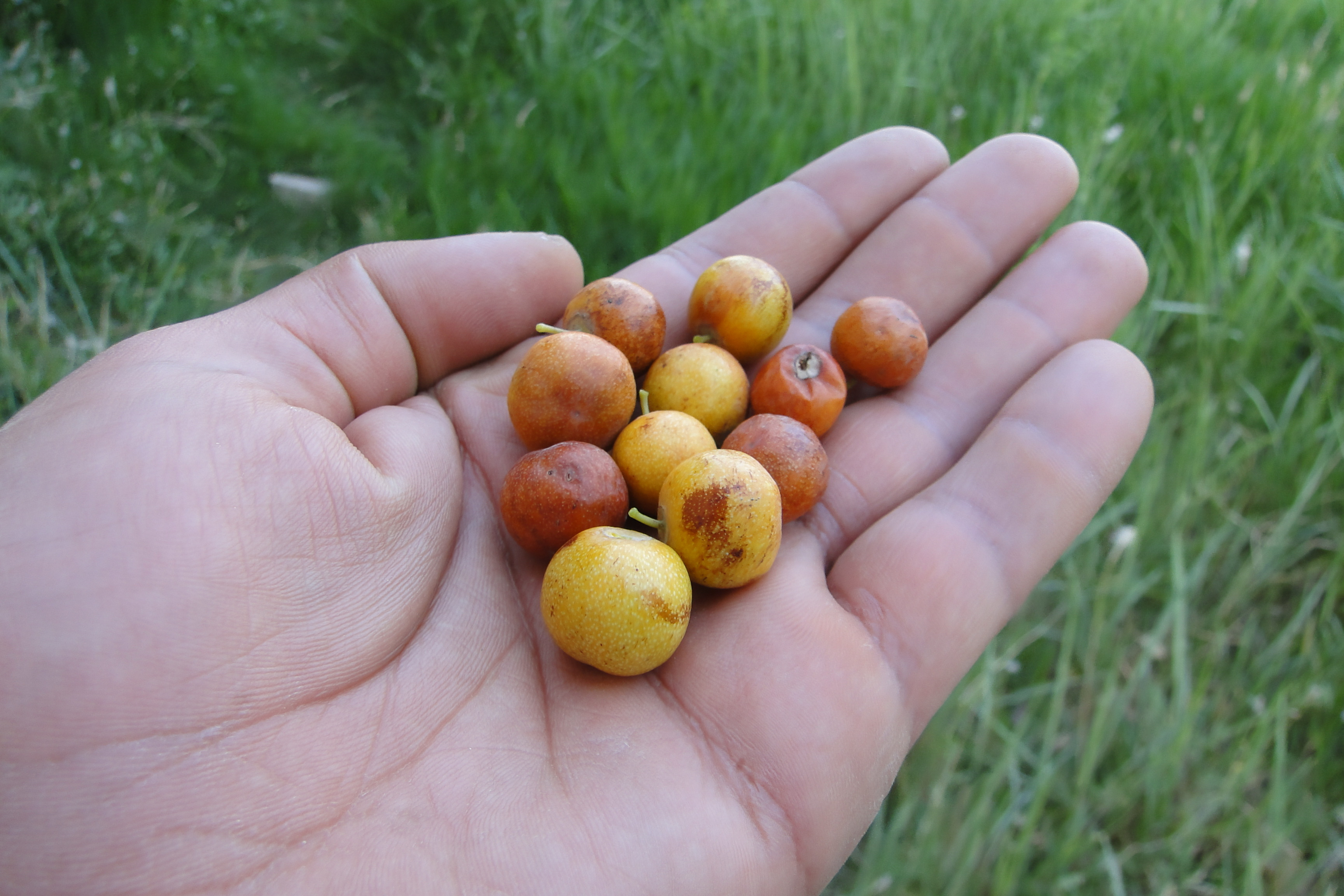
Persian Zizyphus in Iran

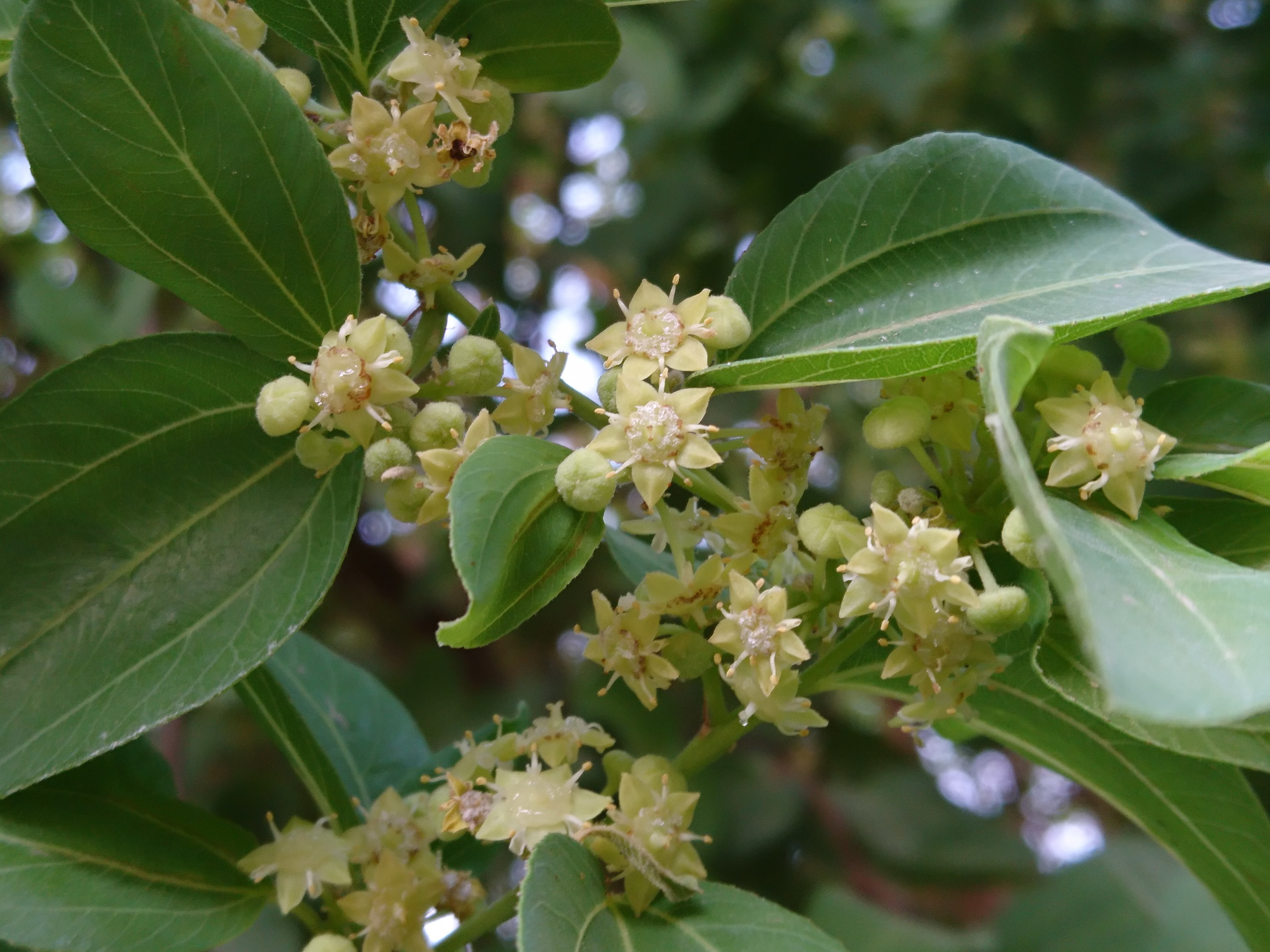
Ziziphus blossom in Behbahan, Iran

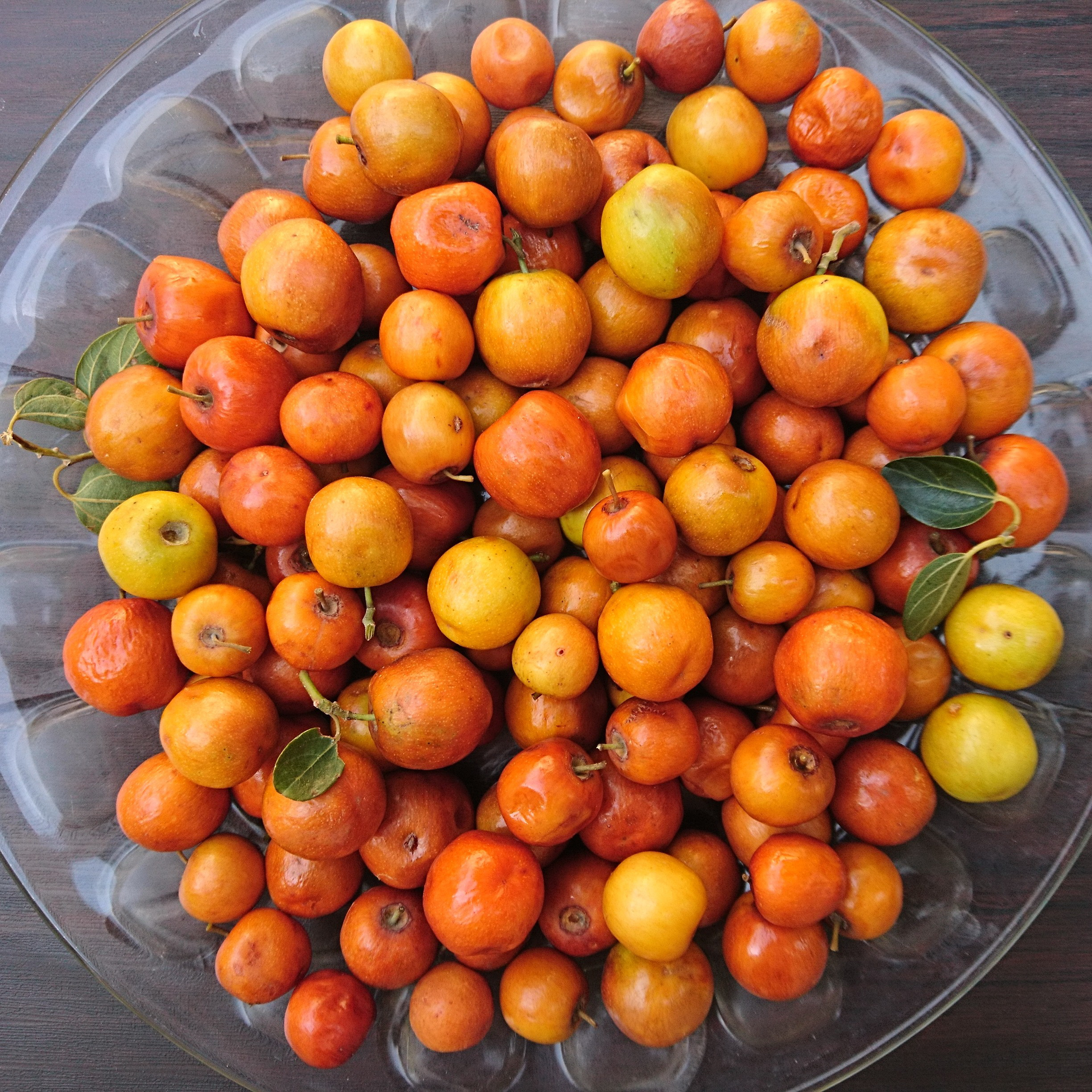
Ziziphus fruit, Behbahan, Iran
