= Petelia medardaria =

Scientific classification
- Kingdom: Animalia
- Phylum: Arthropoda
- Clade: Pancrustacea
- Class: Insecta
- Order: Lepidoptera
- Family: Geometridae
- Genus: Petelia
- Species: P. medardaria

Binomial name
- Petelia medardaria Herrich-Schäffer, [1856]

Synonyms
- Bargosa chandubija Walker, 1860; Bargosa chacoraca Walker, 1860

Species of moth

Petelia medardaria is a moth of the family Geometridae first described by Gottlieb August Wilhelm Herrich-Schäffer in 1856. It is found in the Indian subregion, Sri Lanka, Malaysia, Borneo, Queensland and the Bismarck Islands.

It is a small straw-coloured moth. Its wingspan is 3 cm. Dark spots are found near the wingtips and/or a dark line on each wing. A strong discal spot is found on the underside of the hindwing. Host plants of the caterpillar include Gouania leptostachya, Ziziphus incurva, Ziziphus jujuba, Ziziphus mauritiana, Ziziphus oenoplia, Ziziphus rugosa and Hovenia dulcis.
