= Ziziphus cambodiana =

Conservation status
- Least Concern (IUCN 3.1)

Scientific classification
- Kingdom: Plantae
- Clade: Tracheophytes
- Clade: Angiosperms
- Clade: Eudicots
- Clade: Rosids
- Order: Rosales
- Family: Rhamnaceae
- Genus: Ziziphus
- Species: Z. cambodiana

Binomial name
- Ziziphus cambodiana Pierre

Species of tree

Ziziphus cambodiana (Khmer: អង្គ្រង, angkrong) is a deciduous thorny shrub, or vine, some 2–6 m tall, found growing in secondary undergrowth in Cambodia, Laos and Vietnam, and northern Thailand.

== Distribution ==
It occurs in Thailand in Sa Kaeo Province and in Chiang Mai Province.

== Ecology ==
Moungsrimuangdee et al. include it as a riparian species in their study of the flora along the Phra Prong River in Watthana Nakhon District in Thailand, where it flowers in June. In mixed deciduous forest of Laos, the shrub becomes more common after logging, and to a lesser extent after shifting cultivation. On the islands of the Mekong River between Kratié and Stung Treng in northern Cambodia the plant is moderately abundant. It grows as a "wickedly spiny" climber/liana in the prevalent bamboo and deciduous seasonal hardwood forest, and in degraded areas, secondary growth and deciduous dipterocarp forest. There it flowers in April and May, fruits from October to December, and has leaves between May and December. The fruits are harvested.

== Uses ==
The wood is used to make charcoal in Cambodia, and a decoction of the bark is used in traditional medicine to treat ovarian diseases and yeast infections.

Villagers living on the plateau of Phnom Kulen National Park, in Svay Leu District, Siem Reap Province, northwestern Cambodia, use parts of the shrub in their traditional medicinal practices. The wood chips are decocted alone to treat stomach ache, they are also combined with the vine Willughbeia edulis and wood chips from Cananga latifolia in a decoction to treat stomach ache, circulation problems and/or to increase appetite. In order to help in pregnancy, a decoction of Z. cambodiana bark and an unidentified vine known as trolaing piən is drunk.

Among Kuy- and Khmer-speaking people living in the same villages in Stung Treng and Preah Vihear provinces of north-central Cambodia, the plant is also used as a source of medicine, as well as for unspecified other uses.

The Bunong people of Mondulkiri Province, northeastern Cambodia, have a number of traditional medicinal practices that involve the shrub. The fruits are eaten or are decocted and drunk alone or in a mixture with bark, root and wood of Cananga latifolia, whole plant of Hydnophytum formicarum, roots from various Leea species and Uraria crinita or U. lagopodiodes and bark of Vachellia harmandiana to treat stomach ache. To treat diarrhoea, a decoction of bark, fruit and wood of Z. cambodiana is drunk. The leaves and wood of this plant together with those of Taxillus chinensis are decocted and drunk to treat cough. Leucorrhoea is treated with a decocted mix of the bark and wood of Amphineurion marginatum, Cananga latifolia, Harrisonia perforata, Polyalthia cerasoides, Uvaria rufa, Z. cambodiana, and Ziziphus oenoplia, the leaves and wood (?) of Hoya kerrii and roots of Leea species and Oroxylum indicum. A decoction of the roots of Z. cambodiana is drunk to treat food intolerance after having given birth.

In northern Thailand, the plant has been among those identified as being used by Karen people of Chiang Mai Province to treat gastric ulcers.
