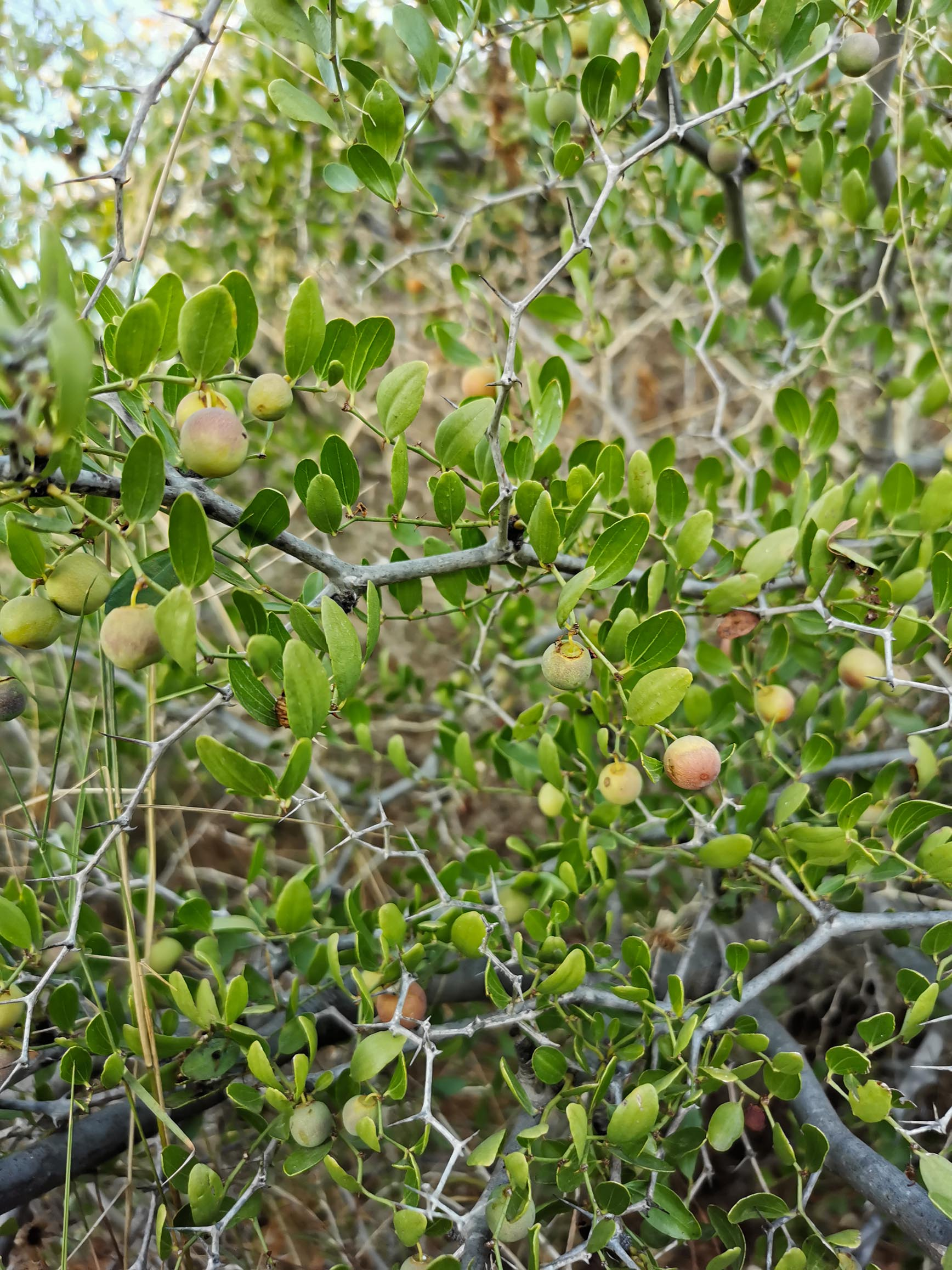

Scientific classification
- Kingdom: Plantae
- Clade: Embryophytes
- Clade: Tracheophytes
- Clade: Angiosperms
- Clade: Eudicots
- Clade: Rosids
- Order: Rosales
- Family: Rhamnaceae
- Genus: Ziziphus
- Species: Z. lotus

Binomial name
- Ziziphus lotus (L.) Lam.

Synonyms
- Rhamnus lotus L.

= Ziziphus lotus =

Species of tree

Ziziphus lotus is a small deciduous tree in the buckthorn family Rhamnaceae, native to the Mediterranean region, including the Sahara in Morocco and also Somalia. It is one of several species called "jujube", and is closely related to Z. jujuba, the true jujube.

== Description ==
Ziziphus lotus can reach a height of 2–5 metres (6.6–16.4 ft), with shiny green leaves about 5 cm long. The edible fruit is a globose, dark yellow drupe of 1–1.5 cm diameter.

== Cultural and religious references ==
Ziziphus lotus is often regarded as the lotus tree of Greek mythology. It is thought to be referenced in the Odyssey, consumed by the Lotus-Eaters as a narcotic to induce peaceful apathy.

A sacred lotus tree planted near the temple of Vulcan in Rome was said to have been planted by Romulus, who is said to have been a contemporary of the composer[s] of the Odyssey (8th century BCE); it was still standing some 700 years later, in the time of Pliny the Elder.

In Arabic-speaking regions, Ziziphus lotus, and alternatively Ziziphus jujuba, are closely associated with the lote-trees (sidr) which are mentioned in the Quran, while in Palestine, it is rather Ziziphus spina-christi that is called sidr. Elsewhere in the Arab world, the European and Chinese jujubes are also associated with the lote-trees (sidr).

The 19th century English explorer Richard Burton reported seeing an ancient sidr tree in the mosque containing the Prophet Muhammad's tomb in Medina. It was in a garden dedicated to the prophet's daughter, Fatima. The fruit from the tree was being sold to pilgrims and its leaves used for washing dead bodies.

== See also ==
- Lotus-eaters
