= Hambiliya =

The hambiliya (Sinhala: හැඹිලිය; for "cache") is a small purse for the safe storage of money and other things on a person, in Sri Lanka. It performs the same function as a pocket, because an Osariya (ඔසරිය) for women and a Sarong (සරම) for men do not have any pockets. The hambiliya is carried on a woman in the folds of her osariya.

Its design is often colourful, using dyed leaves and natural colours from clays and other plant material to produce patterns. It is usually woven from reed or rush but may also be made from palm, screwpine, eraminiya or indi kola.

== See also ==
- Inrō
- Sporran
