= Ziziphus cumingiana =

Scientific classification
- Kingdom: Plantae
- Clade: Embryophytes
- Clade: Tracheophytes
- Clade: Angiosperms
- Clade: Eudicots
- Clade: Rosids
- Order: Rosales
- Family: Rhamnaceae
- Genus: Ziziphus
- Species: Z. cumingiana

Binomial name
- Ziziphus cumingiana Merr.

Species of plant

Ziziphus cunmingiana is a liana native to the wet tropical biome of Borneo and Philippines.

== Description ==
Ziziphus cunmingiana has ovate leaves that are average 4~6 cm long.
