= Sarcomphalus havanensis =

Conservation status
- Near Threatened (IUCN 3.1)

Scientific classification
- Kingdom: Plantae
- Clade: Tracheophytes
- Clade: Angiosperms
- Clade: Eudicots
- Clade: Rosids
- Order: Rosales
- Family: Rhamnaceae
- Genus: Sarcomphalus
- Species: S. havanensis

Binomial name
- Sarcomphalus havanensis (Kunth) Griseb.

Varieties
- Sarcomphalus havanensis var. bullatus (Urb.) Hauenschild; Sarcomphalus havanensis var. havanensis

Synonyms
- Ziziphus havanensis Kunth

Species of plant

Sarcomphalus havanensis is a species of flowering plant in the family Rhamnaceae. It is a shrub or tree native to Cuba and Haiti.
