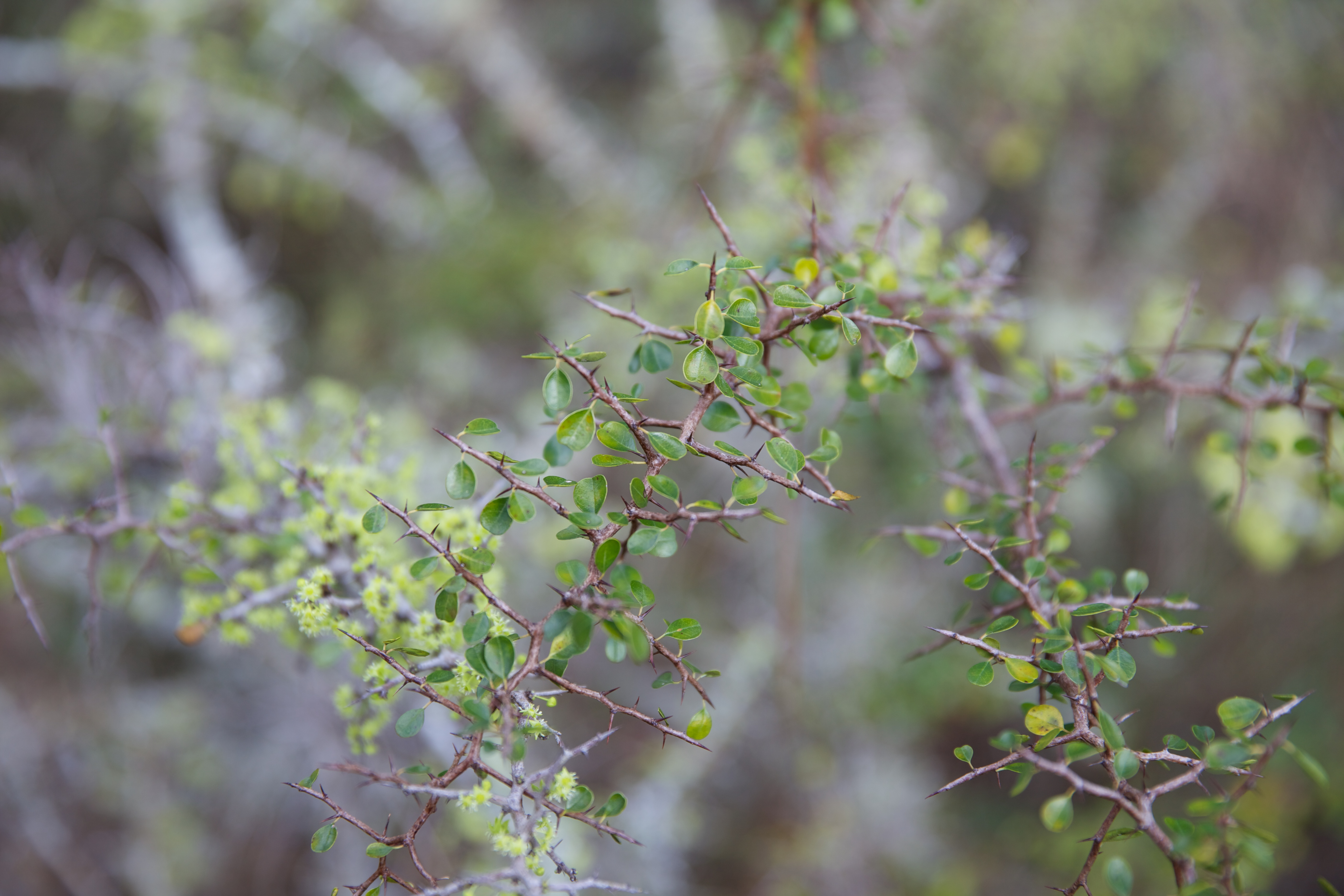

Conservation status
- Critically Endangered (IUCN 3.1)

- Critically Imperiled (NatureServe)

Scientific classification
- Kingdom: Plantae
- Clade: Tracheophytes
- Clade: Angiosperms
- Clade: Eudicots
- Clade: Rosids
- Order: Rosales
- Family: Rhamnaceae
- Genus: Pseudoziziphus
- Species: P. celata

Binomial name
- Pseudoziziphus celata (Judd & D.W.Hall) Hauenschild (2016)

Synonyms
- Condalia celata (Judd & D.W.Hall) M.B.Islam (2015); Ziziphus celata Judd & D.W.Hall (1984)

= Pseudoziziphus celata =

Species of flowering plant

Pseudoziziphus celata, commonly known as the Florida jujube or Florida ziziphus, is a small xeric-adapted shrub endemic to the Lake Wales Ridge in central Florida (restricted to Polk and Highlands counties), and is one of the rarest plants in Florida. It is listed as federally endangered in the United States and state endangered in Florida. It is the sister species of Pseudoziziphus parryi (U.S. Southwest) comprising the only two species in the genus, which are wild relatives of the cultivated jujube (Ziziphus jujuba).

== Description ==
Florida ziziphus is a small spiny shrub that is usually less than 2 meters tall. Clusters of highly fragrant tiny yellow-green flowers are borne in December - February, and grape-sized, yellow-orange fruit may develop in April - May (though they are very rare). It bears small, round, shiny leaves arranged alternately, which are deciduous in the winter dry season. The plant is highly clonal, able to produce numerous ramets from a single genet.

== Range and habitat ==
Florida ziziphus is currently restricted to just twelve extant wild populations in Highlands and Polk County, Florida, which collectively support only about 40 genetically distinct individuals, but which can produce numerous clonal ramets in ideal conditions.

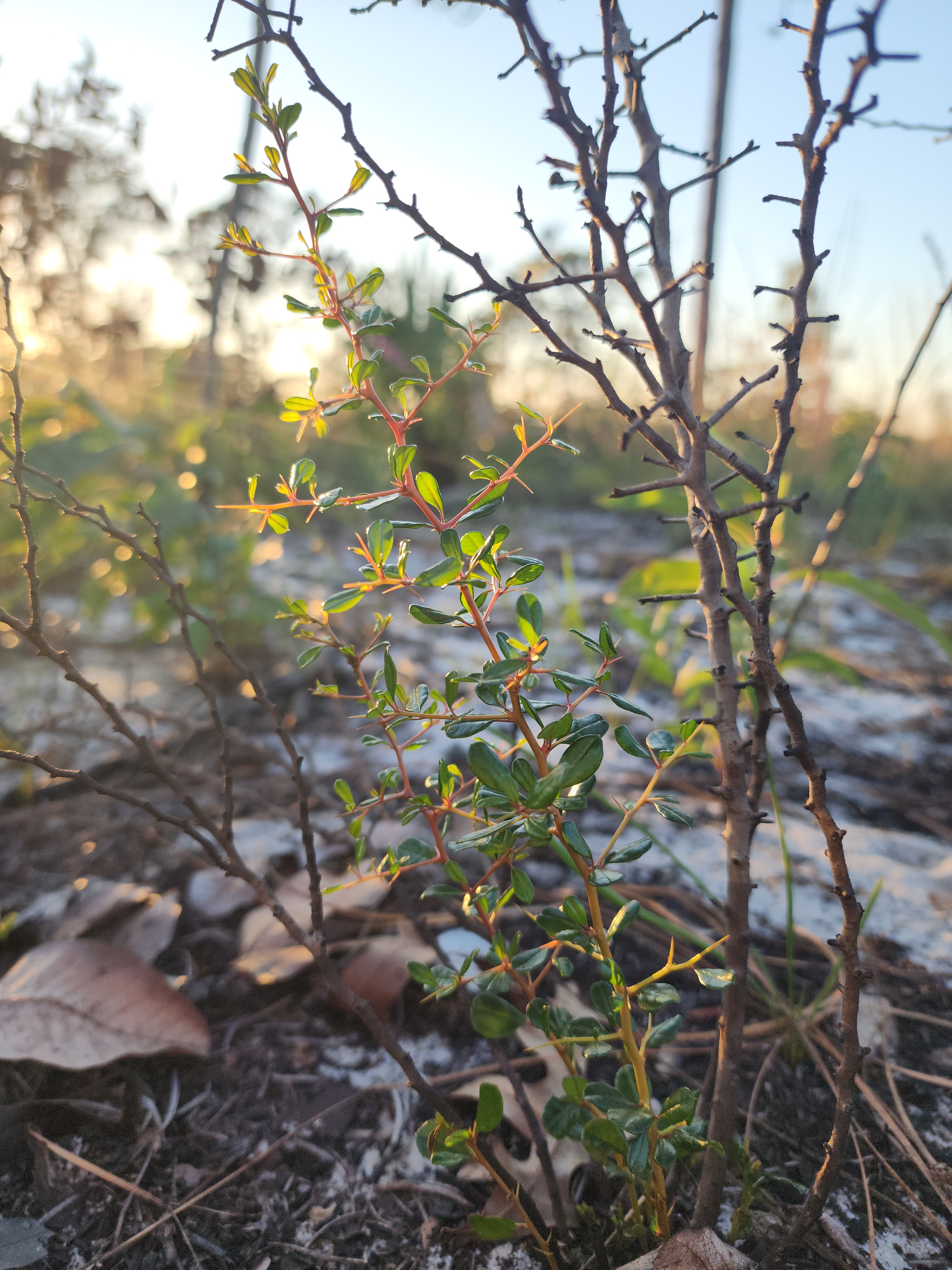
Resprouting after a burn

== Species discovery ==
The first known record of Florida ziziphus was from a single, mysterious, dried herbarium specimen originally collected in 1948 near the city of Sebring in Highlands County, Florida, U.S. Because the precise location of the locality had not been recorded by Ray Garrett, of Avon Park, and because no living plants were known to exist in the wild, the species was presumed extinct. In 1984 the species was described and posthumously named Ziziphus celata by W.S. Judd & D.W. Hall of the University of Florida, celata meaning "hidden." Many botanists later searched for the plant, but none were successful until 1987 when the species was rediscovered by Kris R. DeLaney, a Florida botanist from Avon Park. DeLaney later discovered two additional populations, one consisting of only a single large plant, the other of several dozen scattered over, and persisting in, a large area of improved cattle pasture. The species was re-classified as Pseudoziziphus celata in 2016 based on phylogenetic evidence.

== Conservation ==
Very little remains of central Florida's once vast upland ecosystems. Agribusiness and unplanned, sprawling commercial development in central and south Florida, along with inadequate conservation and regulatory programs, have decimated Florida's ecosystems and pushed hundreds of native plant and animals species to the brink of extinction. Florida's ecosystems and vegetative communities have been so completely disrupted, and so much genetic diversity lost, that many formerly widespread and common plants are considered to be "genetically" extinct, and incapable of adapting and surviving as part of a functioning ecosystem.

Pseudoziziphus celata cannot sexually reproduce with identical clones; a captive breeding population is present at Bok Tower Gardens.

Pseudoziziphus celata is very nearly extinct. Of the eight known populations, four are in old pastures, three on degraded sites, and the most recent discovery is in its natural sandhill habitat, found in early April, 2007 by Brett Miley, a Florida ecologist, while photographing other endangered plants.

Pseudoziziphus celata is listed as an endangered species in the United States.
