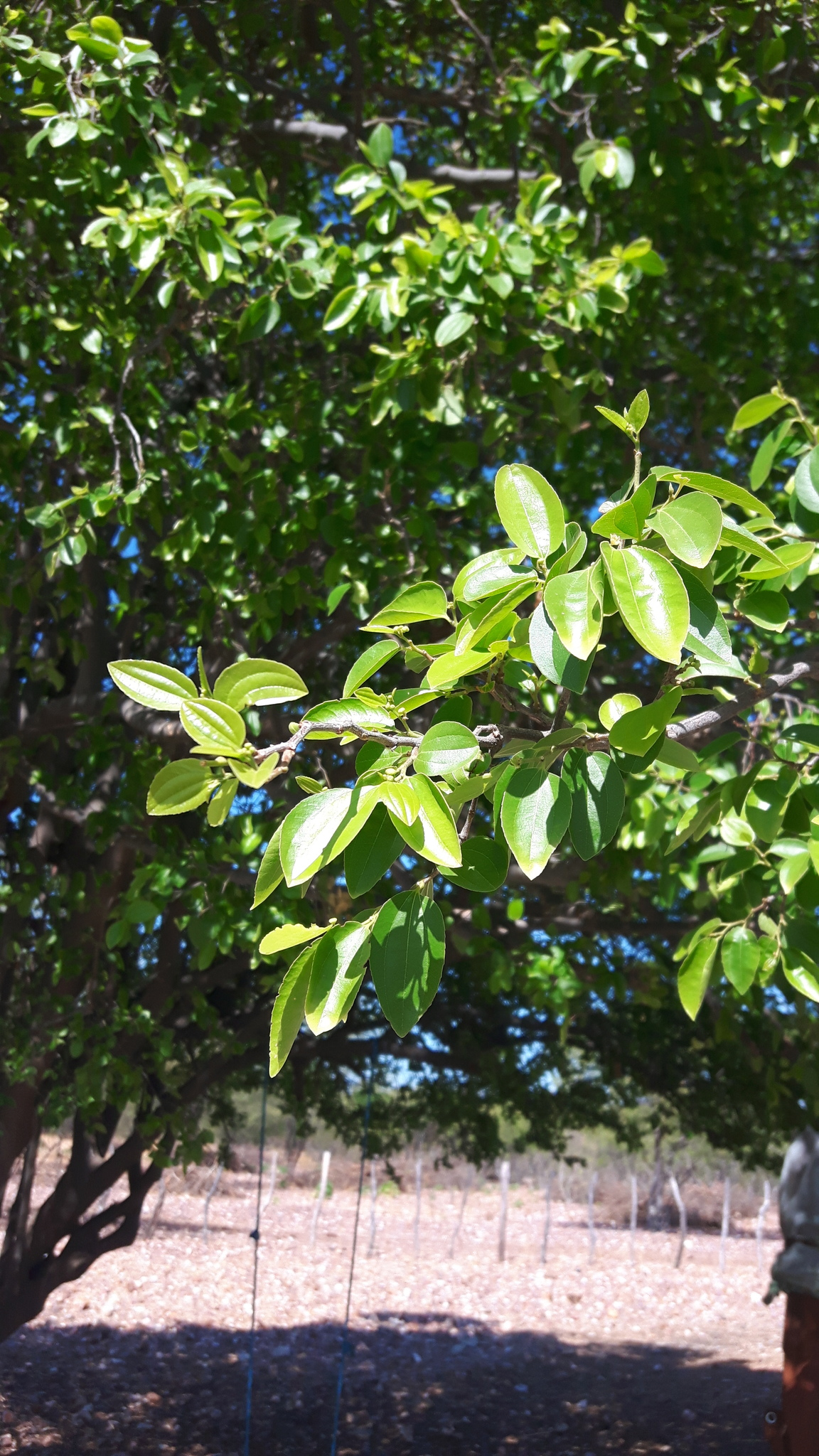
- Sarcomphalus joazeiro

Scientific classification
- Kingdom: Plantae
- Clade: Tracheophytes
- Clade: Angiosperms
- Clade: Eudicots
- Clade: Rosids
- Order: Rosales
- Family: Rhamnaceae
- Tribe: Paliureae
- Genus: Sarcomphalus; P.Browne

= Sarcomphalus =

Genus of plants

Sarcomphalus is a genus of plants in the family Rhamnaceae.

== Species ==
The following species are recognised in the genus Sarcomphalus:

- Sarcomphalus acutifolius Griseb.
- Sarcomphalus amole (Sessé & Moc.) Hauenschild
- Sarcomphalus bidens Urb.
- Sarcomphalus chloroxylon (L.) Hauenschild
- Sarcomphalus cinnamomum (Triana & Planch.) Hauenschild
- Sarcomphalus crenatus Urb.
- Sarcomphalus cyclocardius (S.F.Blake) Hauenschild
- Sarcomphalus divaricatus Griseb.
- Sarcomphalus domingensis (Spreng.) Krug & Urb.
- Sarcomphalus glaziovii (Warm.) Hauenschild
- Sarcomphalus guatemalensis (Hemsl.) Hauenschild
- Sarcomphalus havanensis (Kunth) Griseb.
- Sarcomphalus joazeiro (Mart.) Hauenschild
- Sarcomphalus laurinus Griseb.
- Sarcomphalus lloydii (Standl.) Hauenschild
- Sarcomphalus microdictyus Urb. & Ekman
- Sarcomphalus mistol (Griseb.) Hauenschild
- Sarcomphalus obovatus Urb.
- Sarcomphalus parvifolius Urb. & Ekman
- Sarcomphalus piurensis (Pilg.) Hauenschild
- Sarcomphalus platyphyllus (Reissek) Hauenschild
- Sarcomphalus reticulatus (Vahl) Urb.
- Sarcomphalus rhodoxylon (Urb.) Hauenschild
- Sarcomphalus saeri (Pittier) Hauenschild
- Sarcomphalus strychnifolius (Triana & Planch.) Hauenschild
- Sarcomphalus taylorii Britton
- Sarcomphalus thyrsiflorus (Benth.) Hauenschild
- Sarcomphalus undulatus (Reissek) Hauenschild

=== Formerly placed here ===
- Conalma mexicana (Rose) G.L.Nesom (as Sarcomphalus mexicanus (Rose) Hauenschild)
- Conalma pedunculata (Brandegee) G.L.Nesom (as Sarcomphalus pedunculatus (Brandegee) Hauenschild)
- Conalma yucatanensis (Standl.) G.L.Nesom (as Sarcomphalus yucatanensis (Standl.) Hauenschild)
- Condaliopsis obtusifolia (Hook. ex Torr. & A.Gray) Suess. (as Sarcomphalus obtusifolius (Hook. ex Torr. & A.Gray) Hauenschild)
