= Ziziphus angustifolia =

Conservation status
- Least Concern (IUCN 3.1)

Scientific classification
- Kingdom: Plantae
- Clade: Tracheophytes
- Clade: Angiosperms
- Clade: Eudicots
- Clade: Rosids
- Order: Rosales
- Family: Rhamnaceae
- Genus: Ziziphus
- Species: Z. angustifolia

Binomial name
- Ziziphus angustifolia (Miq.) Hatus. ex Steenis

Synonyms
- Celtis angustifolia (Miq.) Planch.; Solenostigma angustifolium Miq.; Celtis grewioides Warb.; Ziziphus forbesii Baker f.; Ziziphus grewioides (Warb.) L.M.Perry; Ziziphus inermis Merr.

Species of tree

Ziziphus angustifolia is a tree in the family Rhamnaceae. The specific epithet angustifolia means 'narrow leaves'.

== Description ==
Ziziphus angustifolia grows up to 30 m (100 ft) tall, with a trunk diameter of up to 40 cm (16 in). It has buttresses up to 1 m (3 ft) high and extending out to 1.5 m (5 ft). The grey-brown bark has lenticels. The leaves are ovate to elliptic and measure up to 20 cm (8 in) long. The inflorescences, in cymes, feature yellow to green flowers.

== Distribution and habitat ==
Ziziphus angustifolia is native to an area from Myanmar and the Philippines in the north, south to Java and east to the Solomon Islands. Its habitat is in dipterocarp forests to elevations of 600 m (2,000 ft).
