= Ziziphus hutchinsonii =

Conservation status
- Endangered (IUCN 3.1)

Scientific classification
- Kingdom: Plantae
- Clade: Tracheophytes
- Clade: Angiosperms
- Clade: Eudicots
- Clade: Rosids
- Order: Rosales
- Family: Rhamnaceae
- Genus: Ziziphus
- Species: Z. hutchinsonii

Binomial name
- Ziziphus hutchinsonii Merr.

Species of tree

Ziziphus hutchinsonii is a species of tree in the family Rhamnaceae. It is endemic to the Philippines.
