= Ziziphus quadrilocularis =

Conservation status
- Least Concern (IUCN 3.1)

Scientific classification
- Kingdom: Plantae
- Clade: Tracheophytes
- Clade: Angiosperms
- Clade: Eudicots
- Clade: Rosids
- Order: Rosales
- Family: Rhamnaceae
- Genus: Ziziphus
- Species: Z. quadrilocularis

Binomial name
- Ziziphus quadrilocularis F.Muell.

Species of flowering plant

Ziziphus quadrilocularis is a species of flowering plant endemic to Australia. Its name in the indigenous Wardaman language is Mardarrgu. It is a shrub or tree native to the northern Northern Territory and northern Western Australia.

== Description ==
The Ziziphus quadrilocularis is a deciduous, spiny shrub or tree, growing to 2–12 m in height. It bears green and yellow flowers from November to March. It has a life span of over 20 years, producing its first seeds at an age of 6–10 years. After being scorched by wildfire it can resprout from a lignotuber and root suckers.

== Distribution and habitat ==
Ziziphus quadrilocularis is limited to northern Australia where it occurs in the Kimberley region of Western Australia and adjacent areas of the Northern Territory. It is found on basalt and sandstone derived soils along watercourses, hillsides and scree slopes.

== Uses ==
The fruit is edible.
