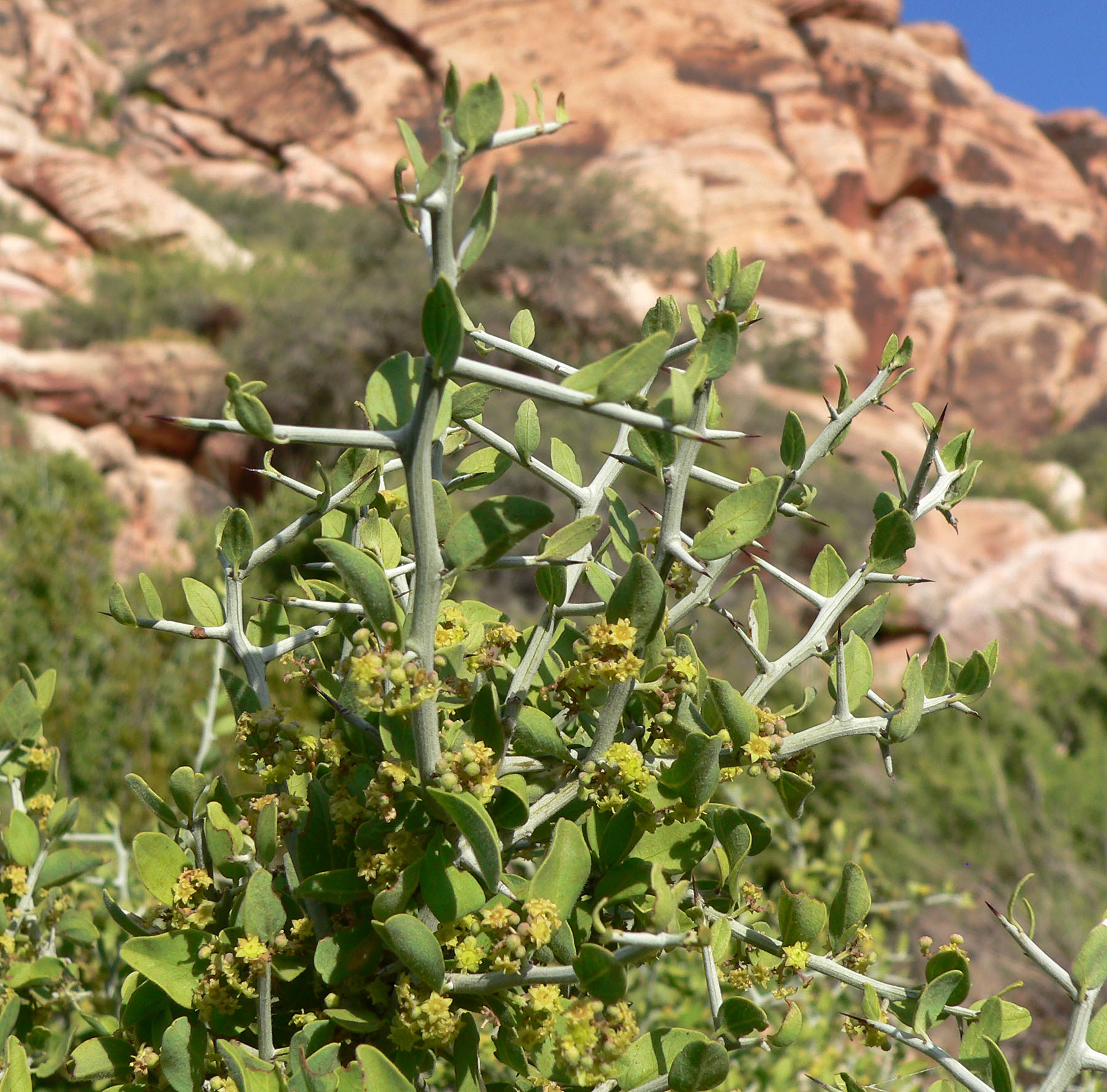
- Ziziphus obtusifolia var. canescens

Scientific classification
- Kingdom: Plantae
- Clade: Embryophytes
- Clade: Tracheophytes
- Clade: Spermatophytes
- Clade: Angiosperms
- Clade: Eudicots
- Clade: Rosids
- Order: Rosales
- Family: Rhamnaceae
- Genus: Ziziphus
- Species: Z. obtusifolia

Binomial name
- Ziziphus obtusifolia (Hook. ex Torr. & A.Gray) A. Gray

= Ziziphus obtusifolia =

Species of tree

Ziziphus obtusifolia is a species of flowering plant in the buckthorn family known by several common names, including lotebush, graythorn, gumdrop tree, and Texas buckthorn.

== Distribution ==
The plant is native to the South Central and Southwestern United States, the California deserts, and central through northern Mexico.

It grows in shrubby and scrubby desert habitats, grasslands and prairie, woodlands, and other habitat types. It can be found among desert plants such as honey mesquite, smooth mesquite, ocotillo and creosote.

== Description ==
Ziziphus obtusifolia is a shrub with many branches forming a thorny tangle which may exceed 3 metres (9.8 ft) tall and approach 4 metres (13 ft) at times.

The leaves are deciduous and are absent for much of the year, leaving the shrub a naked thicket of gray twigs coated in waxy whitish hairs. The ends of the twigs taper into sharp-tipped thorns. The thick, glandular gray or green leaves have oval blades 1 or 2 centimeters long.

The inflorescence is a cluster of several dull yellow-green flowers. The fruit is a mealy, juicy drupe containing one seed.

The fruit provides food for many species of birds and mammals. Birds use the shrub as a nesting site and the southern plains woodrat uses the twigs to build its houses.

== Notes ==
This species has recently been reclassified to Condaliopsis obtusifolia (Hook. ex Torr. & A.Gray) Suess.

This reflects the fact that this species and other New World species formerly placed in Ziziphus have distinctive characters that differentiate them from the Old World species.
