= Pseudoziziphus =

Scientific classification
- Kingdom: Plantae
- Clade: Tracheophytes
- Clade: Angiosperms
- Clade: Eudicots
- Clade: Rosids
- Order: Rosales
- Family: Rhamnaceae
- Genus: Pseudoziziphus; Hauenschild (2016)

Species
- Pseudoziziphus celata (Judd & D.W.Hall) Hauenschild; Pseudoziziphus parryi (Torr.) Hauenschild

Genus of flowering plants

Pseudoziziphus is a genus of flowering plants in the buckthorn family, Rhamnaceae. It includes two species of shrubs native to North America.

- Pseudoziziphus celata (Judd & D.W.Hall) Hauenschild – Florida
- Pseudoziziphus parryi (Torr.) Hauenschild – southern California and Baja California
