= Ziziphus robertsoniana =

Conservation status
- Endangered (IUCN 3.1)

Scientific classification
- Kingdom: Plantae
- Clade: Embryophytes
- Clade: Tracheophytes
- Clade: Angiosperms
- Clade: Eudicots
- Clade: Rosids
- Order: Rosales
- Family: Rhamnaceae
- Genus: Ziziphus
- Species: Z. robertsoniana

Binomial name
- Ziziphus robertsoniana Beentje

Species of flowering plant

Ziziphus robertsoniana is a species of plant in the family Rhamnaceae. It is found primarily in Kwale, on the southern coast of Kenya, and may also be found in Tanzania. It is threatened by habitat loss.

It was described in 1996 by Henk Jaap Beentje, after having been collected by Mrs. Ann Robertson from Malindi, Kenya, in 1983.
