= Ziziphus abyssinica =

Conservation status
- Least Concern (IUCN 3.1)

Scientific classification
- Kingdom: Plantae
- Clade: Tracheophytes
- Clade: Angiosperms
- Clade: Eudicots
- Clade: Rosids
- Order: Rosales
- Family: Rhamnaceae
- Genus: Ziziphus
- Species: Z. abyssinica

Binomial name
- Ziziphus abyssinica Hochst. ex A.Rich.

Synonyms
- Ziziphus atacorensis A.Chev.; Ziziphus atacorensis var. oblongifolia A.Chev.; Ziziphus baguirmiae A.Chev., nom. nud.; Ziziphus jujuba var. abyssinica (Hochst. ex A.Rich.) Fiori; Ziziphus jujuba var. nemoralis Sim; Ziziphus jujuba f. obliquifolia Engl.; Ziziphus jujuba var. obliquifolia Engl., nom. illeg. homonym. post.; Ziziphus mauritiana var. abyssinica (Hochst. ex A.Rich.) Fiori

Species of tree

Ziziphus abyssinica is a species of flowering plant in the family Rhamnaceae. It is a shrub or tree native to tropical Africa.

== Habitation and distribution ==
It is endemic to dryer habitats across tropical Africa, south of the Sahel and north of the southern African deserts.

== Description ==
Ziziphus abyssinica has distinct pairs of one hooked and one straight thorn, similar to the related southern African Ziziphus mucronata.
