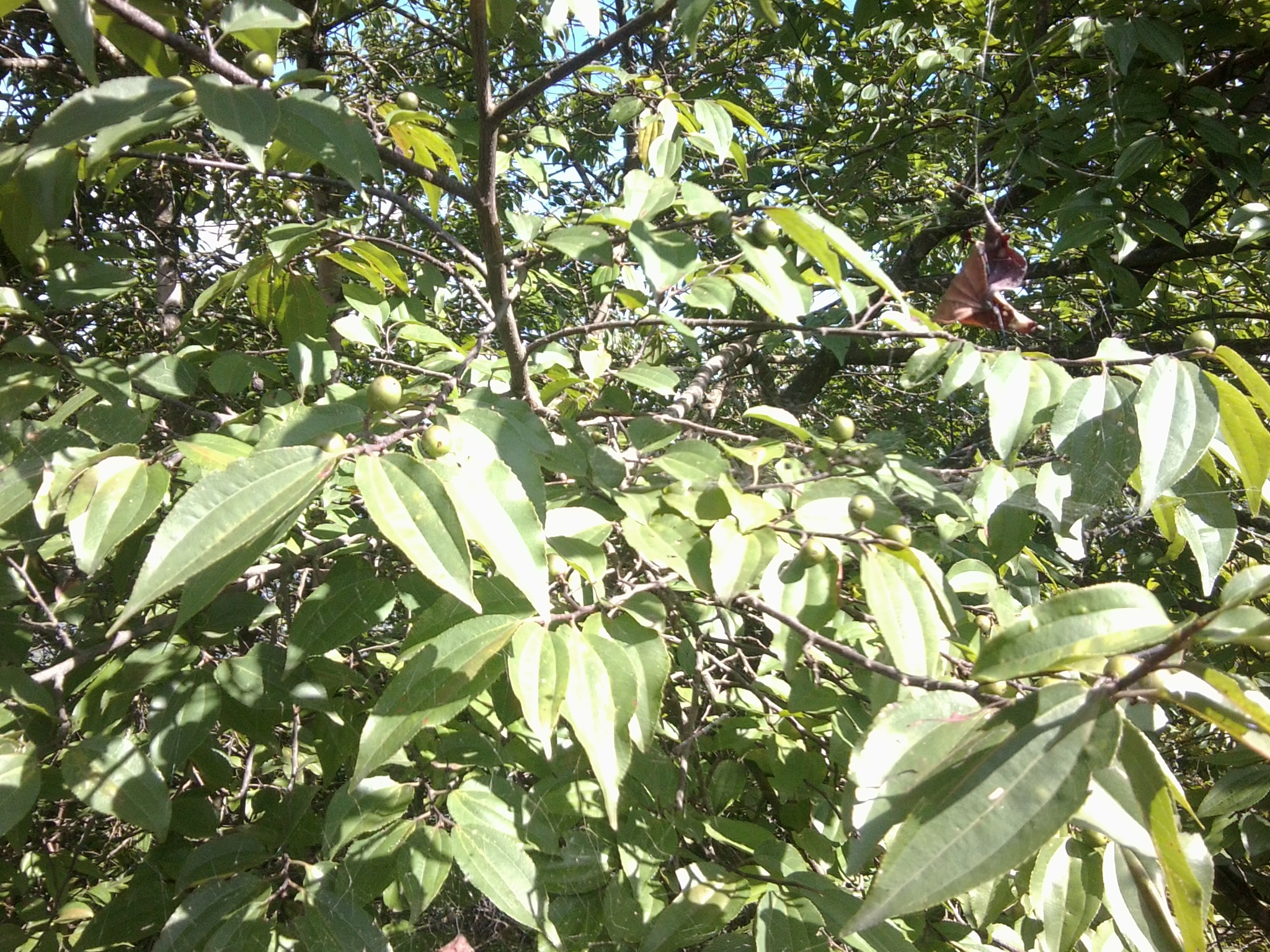
- Ziziphus incurva with unripe fruits

Conservation status
- Least Concern (IUCN 3.1)

Scientific classification
- Kingdom: Plantae
- Clade: Tracheophytes
- Clade: Angiosperms
- Clade: Eudicots
- Clade: Rosids
- Order: Rosales
- Family: Rhamnaceae
- Genus: Ziziphus
- Species: Z. incurva

Binomial name
- Ziziphus incurva Roxb.

Synonyms
- Paliurus virgatus D.Don; Ziziphus paniculata Buch.-Ham. ex D.Don, not validly publ.; Ziziphus virgata (D.Don) D.Dietr.; Ziziphus yunnanensis C.K.Schneid.

= Ziziphus incurva =

Species of tree

Ziziphus incurva is a medium-sized tree from the family Rhamnaceae which gives edible fruit. It is native to the central and eastern Himalayas, northern Indochina, and southern China. It is found from 900 to 1,600 metres (3,000 to 5,200 ft) elevation in eastern Nepal including Kathmandu valley.
