= Lotus tree =

Plant in Greek and Roman mythology

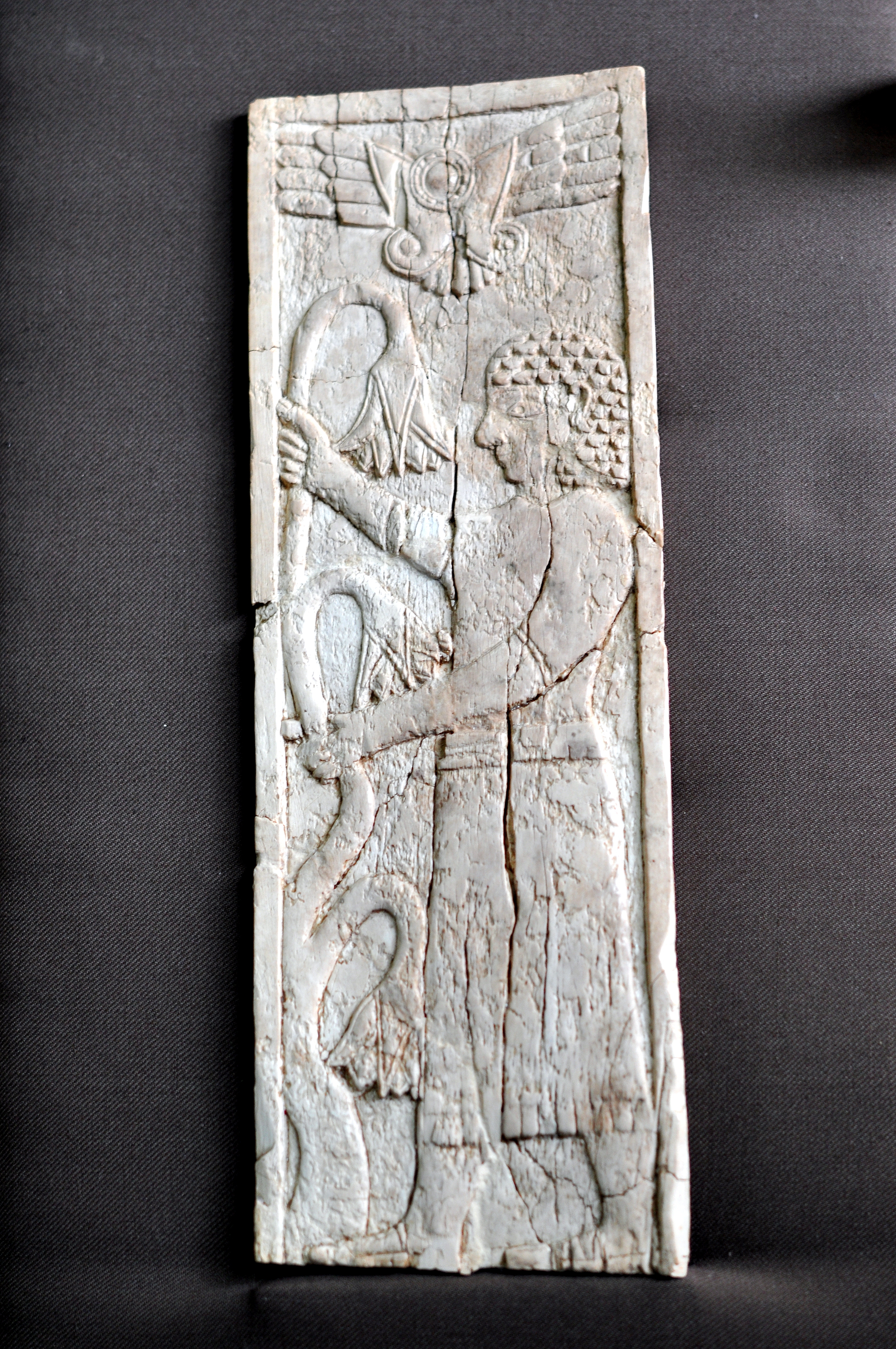
A standing man, Egyptian appearance, holding branches of a lotus tree. Excavated by a BISI team in the mid-20th century CE. Neo-Assyrian period, 9th-7th centuries BCE. From Nimrud, Mesopotamia, Iraq.

The lotus tree (Ancient Greek: λωτός, lōtós) is a plant that is referred to in stories from Greek and Roman mythology. It is not known if it was real or mythical, and there are multiple candidates for possible real plants that might have been given that name.

The lotus tree is mentioned in Homer's Odyssey as bearing a fruit that caused a pleasant drowsiness, and which was said to be the only food of an island people called the Lotophagi or lotus-eaters. When they ate of the lotus tree, they would forget their friends and homes and would lose their desire to return to their native land in favor of living in idleness.

Botanical candidates for the lotus tree include the persimmon (Diospyros lotus), which is a sub-evergreen tree native to Southwest Asia and Southeast Europe that grows to about 25 ft (7.6 m) bearing yellowish green flowers, as well as Ziziphus lotus, a plant with an edible fruit closely related to the jujube, native to the Mediterranean region of Europe, Asia and North Africa.

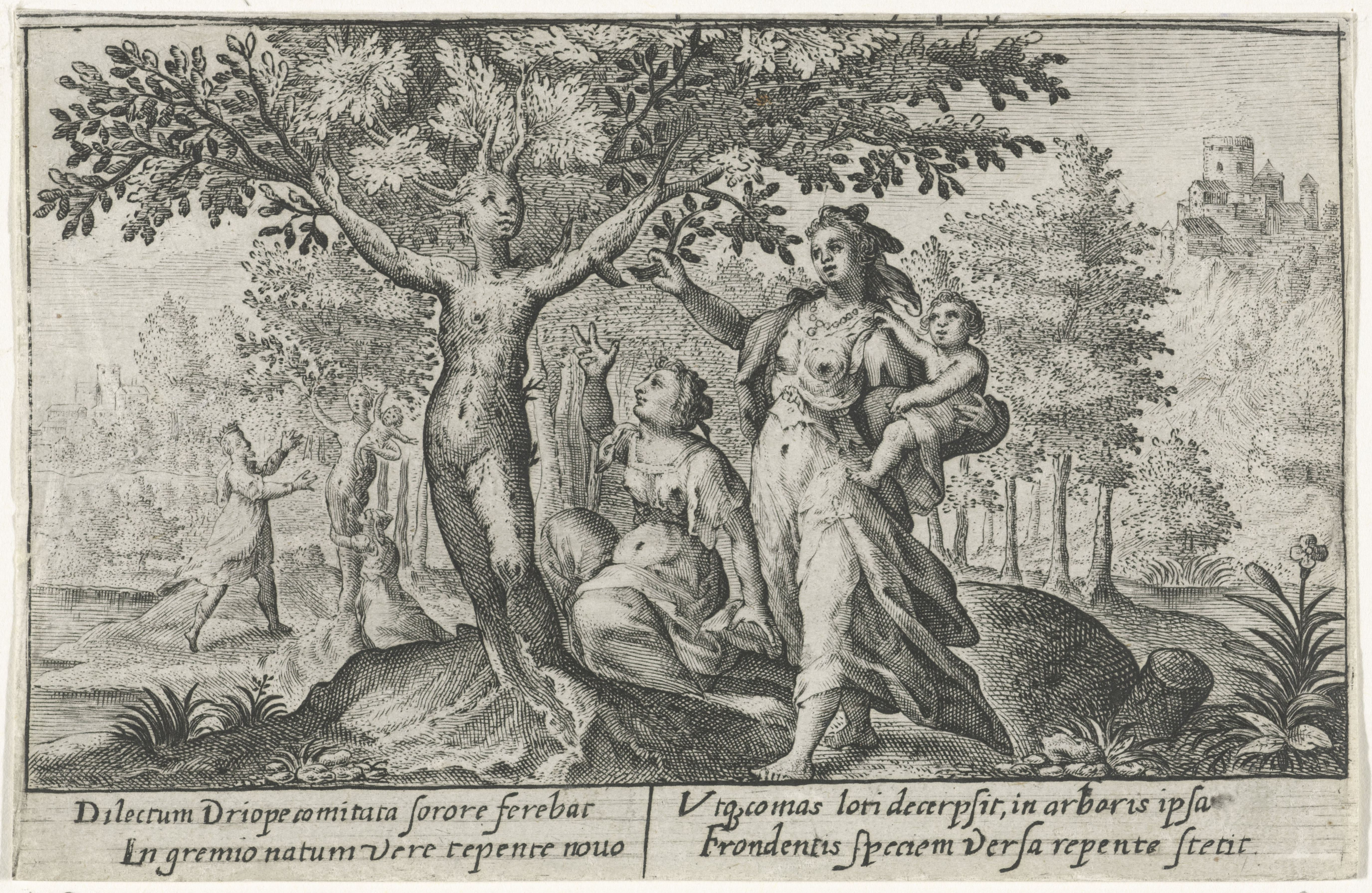
Dryope is changed into a lotus-plant when to please her little boy she picks a flower from the metamorphosed Lotis which then starts to bleed (Ovid, Metamorphoses IX 331)

In Ovid's Metamorphoses, the nymph Lotis was the beautiful daughter of Neptune, the god of water and the sea. In order to flee the violent attention of Priapus, she invoked the assistance of the gods, who answered her prayers by turning her into a lotus tree.

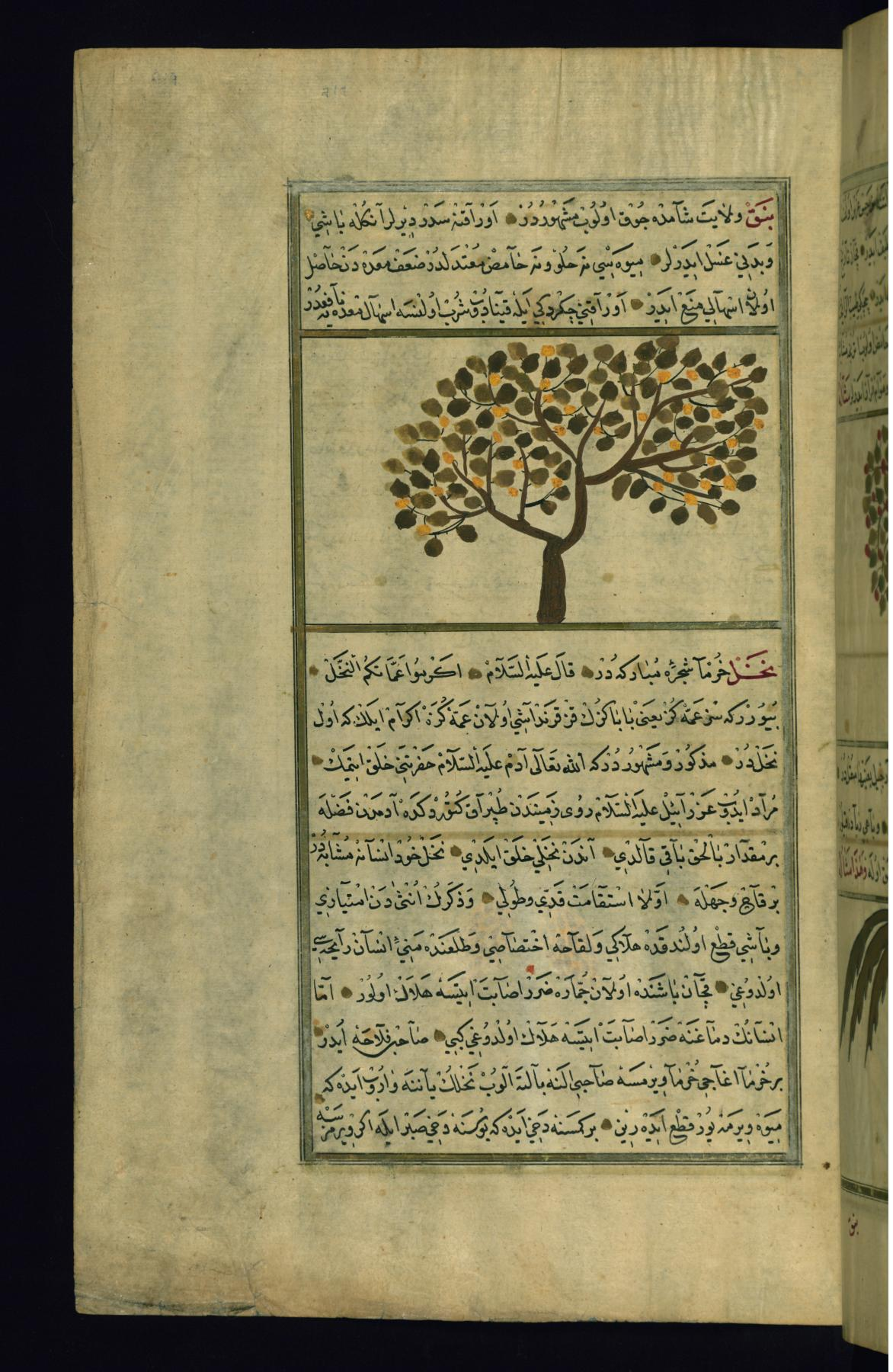
This illustration from Walters manuscript W.659 depicts a lotus tree (nabq).

The Quran has a legendary plant, the Lote tree, that marks the end of the seventh heaven. In the Bible, the Book of Job also has two lines (40:21–22), with the Hebrew word צֶאֱלִים (tse'elim), which appears nowhere else in the Bible. A recent translation into English has been "lotus trees" since the publication of the Revised Version of the King James Bible of 1881. However, it is otherwise rendered simply as "shady trees".

== See also ==
- List of plants known as lotus
- Lotus (genus)
- Nymphaea lotus
