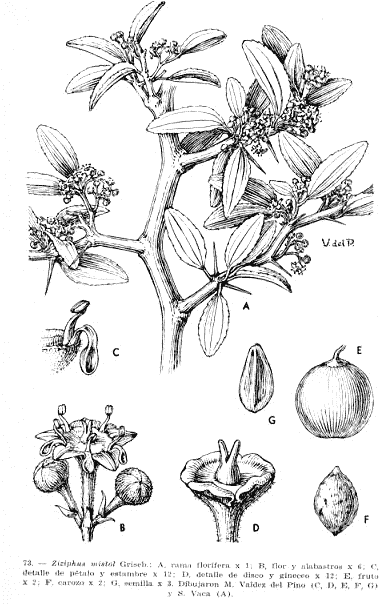

Conservation status
- Data Deficient (IUCN 2.3)

Scientific classification
- Kingdom: Plantae
- Clade: Tracheophytes
- Clade: Angiosperms
- Clade: Eudicots
- Clade: Rosids
- Order: Rosales
- Family: Rhamnaceae
- Genus: Sarcomphalus
- Species: S. mistol

Binomial name
- Sarcomphalus mistol (Griseb.) Hauenschild (2016)

Synonyms
- Ziziphus mistol Griseb. (1874); Ziziphus oblongifolia S.Moore (1895); Ziziphus weberbaueri Pilg. (1916)

= Sarcomphalus mistol =

Species of tree

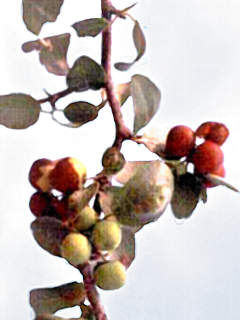

Sarcomphalus mistol or mistol is a species of spiniferous shrub or tree of the family Rhamnaceae. It is native to Peru, Bolivia, Paraguay, and northern Argentina in South America, and very abundant in parts of the Gran Chaco of northern Argentina and Paraguay. The word "mistol" derives from colonial era Spanish, from the word "mixture" (mezcla) since it was believed that mistol was a hybrid between species of genus Schinopsis because of the likely color of its wood to Spaniard colonists' perception.

== Morphology ==
The mistol varies greatly in height, it may reach 10 to 15 meters though most individuals have no more than 4 to 9 meters high. Trunk diameter is also variable, it ranges 20 to 60 centimeters. The branches are pubescent, abundant, with spines near the leaves, and arranged in zig-zag. Its foliage is semi-deciduous. Mistol leaves are oval shaped, alternate, entire, with three prominent basal veins, 2–7 cm long and slightly petiolated. It flowers late in spring, from October to December and fructifies from November to March. The fruit is an edible drupe, reddish-hazel coloured, roughly spherical, 1–5 cm long, sweet and sugary, with a distinct bitterness when ripe.

Mistol wood is quite tough, heavy and enduring (hence its early confusion with that of Schinopsis genus). It is often used in hand held tools, carriage wheels and less frequently to produce slow burning coal.

== Usage ==
Known for centuries before Spanish colonization of Gran Chaco, the mistol was a regular (or even key) dietary item for several local tribes of South American Indians (comechingons, diaguitas, quilmes, etc.). It can be eaten natural when ripe or processed. A known preparation with mistol fruit is arrope, an overcooked result of its juice, pulp and cane sugar. Mistol coffee is available in South American diet shops, it is becoming slowly popular because it contains almost no caffeine or other xanthine alkaloids.

== External images ==
- Herbarium natural sample from The Field Museum website (Chicago)
- Modelled distribution of Ziziphus mistol
