= Lotus-eaters =

Fictional people in Homer's Odyssey

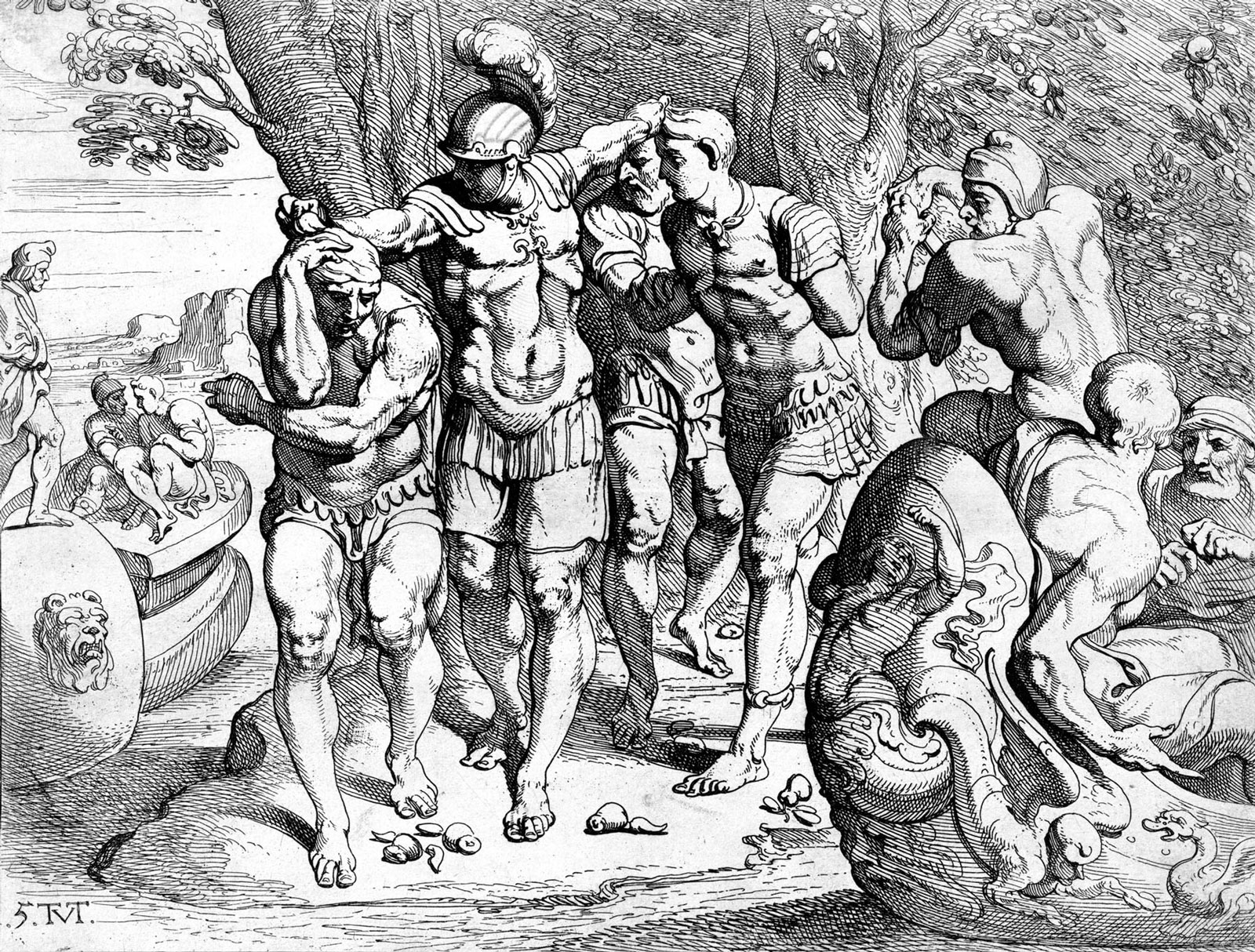
Odysseus removing his men from the company of the lotus-eaters

In Greek mythology, lotophages (Ancient Greek: λωτοφάγοι, romanized: lōtophágoi) were a race of people living on an island dominated by the lotus tree (λωτός lōtós, Latinized as lotus hence also lotus-eaters), a plant whose botanical identity is uncertain. The Lotophagi race in the Odyssey are said to eat the fruit of the lotos "sweet as honey". The lotus fruits and flowers were the primary food of the island and were a narcotic, causing the inhabitants to sleep in peaceful apathy. After they ate the lotus, they would forget their home and loved ones and long only to stay with their fellow lotus-eaters. Those who ate the plant never cared to report or return.

== Etymology ==
In English, the lotus-eaters (Ancient Greek: λωτοφάγοι, lōtophágoi), are also referred to as the lotophagi or lotophaguses (sing. lotophagus /ləˈtɒfəɡəs/) or lotophages (sing. lotophage /ˈloʊtəfeɪdʒ/). Because the Greek word λωτός lōtós can refer to several different plants, there is some ambiguity as to which "lotus" appears in the Odyssey.

== Mythology ==
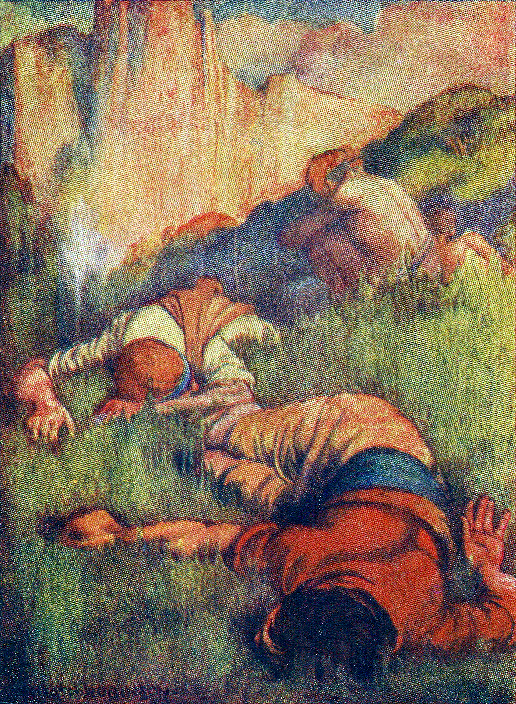
Odysseus' men in an unconscious state, by W. Heath Robinson.

In Homer's epic poem the Odyssey Book IX, Odysseus tells how strong north winds blew him and his men off course as they were rounding Cape Malea, the southernmost tip of the Peloponnesus, headed westwards for Ithaca:

I was driven thence by foul winds for a space of 9 days upon the sea, but on the tenth day we reached the land of the Lotus-eaters, who live on a food that comes from a kind of flower. Here we landed to take in fresh water, and our crews got their mid-day meal on the shore near the ships. When they had eaten and drunk I sent two of my company to see what manner of men the people of the place might be, and they had a third man under them. They started at once, and went about among the Lotus-eaters, who did them no hurt, but gave them to eat of the lotus, which was so delicious that those who ate of it left off caring about home, and did not even want to go back and say what had happened to them, but were for staying and munching lotus with the Lotus-eaters without thinking further of their return; nevertheless, though they wept bitterly I forced them back to the ships and made them fast under the benches. Then I told the rest to go on board at once, lest any of them should taste of the lotus and leave off wanting to get home, so they took their places and smote the grey sea with their oars.

== Location ==
Herodotus, in the 5th century BC, was sure that they still existed in his day in coastal Libya:

A promontory jutting out into the sea from the country of the Gindanes (Note: A tribe of Libya which dwelt west of the Macae) is inhabited by the lotus-eaters, who live entirely on the fruit of the lotus-tree. The lotus fruit is about the size of the lentisk berry and in sweetness resembles the date. (Note: In A.D. Godley's translation "mastich-berry".) The lotus-eaters even succeed in obtaining from it a sort of wine.

Polybius identifies the land of the lotus-eaters as the island of Djerba (ancient Meninx), off the coast of Tunisia. Later, this identification is supported by Strabo. Pseudo-Scylax mentions lotus-eaters in area of northern and central Dalmatia ("namely the Iaderatenai and Boulinoi").

== In popular culture ==
The Lotos-Eaters is a poem by Alfred Tennyson, describing a group of mariners who, upon eating the lotos, are put into an altered state and isolated from the outside world.

British romantic composer Hubert Parry wrote a half-hour choral setting of Tennyson's poem for soprano, choir, and orchestra.

The novel Percy Jackson & the Olympians: The Lightning Thief by Rick Riordan features the 'Lotus Hotel and Casino', which is based on the lotus-eaters. The casino muddles the character's senses and distorts time; years can pass without them knowing. In the film adaptation, the characters eat physical Lotus cookies and are only able to escape when they stop eating them. In the show, characters breathe in gas infused with lotus.

"The Lotus Eaters" is a 1935 short story by Stanley G. Weinbaum that explores the Lotus Eaters as an intelligent vegetative species on the planet Venus discovered by human explorers.

The 1972-1973 BBC television series The Lotus Eaters features a group of British ex-pats in Crete, many staying there to escape difficulties or embarrassments in their previous lives.

Lotus eating has been used to describe Polynesian paralysis.

== See also ==
- Moly – another plant mentioned in the Odyssey whose identity has attracted scholarly interest
- Nepenthe – a similar comforting medicine mentioned in the Odyssey
