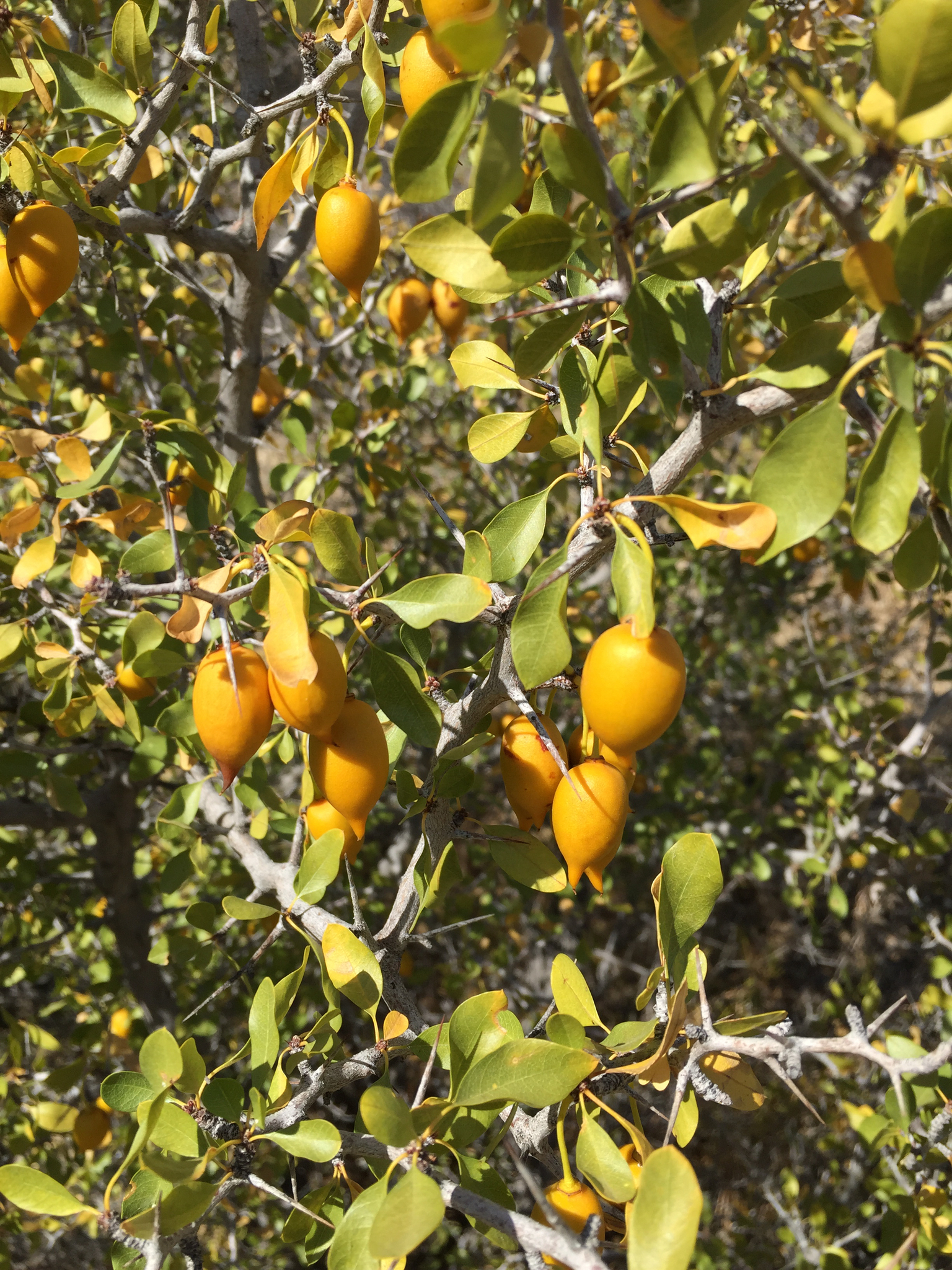

Conservation status
- Least Concern (IUCN 3.1)

- Secure (NatureServe)

Scientific classification
- Kingdom: Plantae
- Clade: Tracheophytes
- Clade: Angiosperms
- Clade: Eudicots
- Clade: Rosids
- Order: Rosales
- Family: Rhamnaceae
- Genus: Pseudoziziphus
- Species: P. parryi

Binomial name
- Pseudoziziphus parryi (Torr.) Hauenschild (2016)

Synonyms
- Condalia parryi (Torr.) Weberb. (1895); Condalia parryi var. microphylla I.M.Johnst. (1922); Condaliopsis parryi (Torr.) Suess. (1953); Pseudoziziphus parryi var. microphylla (I.M.Johnst.) Hauenschild (2016); Ziziphus parryi Torr. (1859); Ziziphus parryi var. microphylla (I.M.Johnst.) M.C.Johnst. (1962)

= Pseudoziziphus parryi =

Species of flowering plant

Pseudoziziphus parryi, synonym Ziziphus parryi, is a species of flowering plant in the buckthorn family known by the common names Parry's jujube, California crucillo, Parry Abrojo, and lotebush.

== Description ==
Pseudoziziphus parryi is a bushy shrub with many intricate branches forming a thorny tangle which may approach 4 metres (13 ft) in height.

The leaves are deciduous and are absent for much of the year, leaving the shrub a naked thicket of brown or grayish twigs. The ends of the twigs taper into sharp-tipped thorns. The membranous olive green leaves are up to 2.5 centimeters long.

The inflorescence is a cluster of a few several yellowish or green-tinged, star-shaped flowers with five petals. The fruit is a dry drupe containing one seed.

== Distribution and habitat ==
The plant is native to the Colorado Desert and southern Mojave Desert, and to the eastern slopes of the Peninsular Ranges in southern California and Baja California, Mexico.

It can be found in chaparral and Sonoran Desert habitats.
