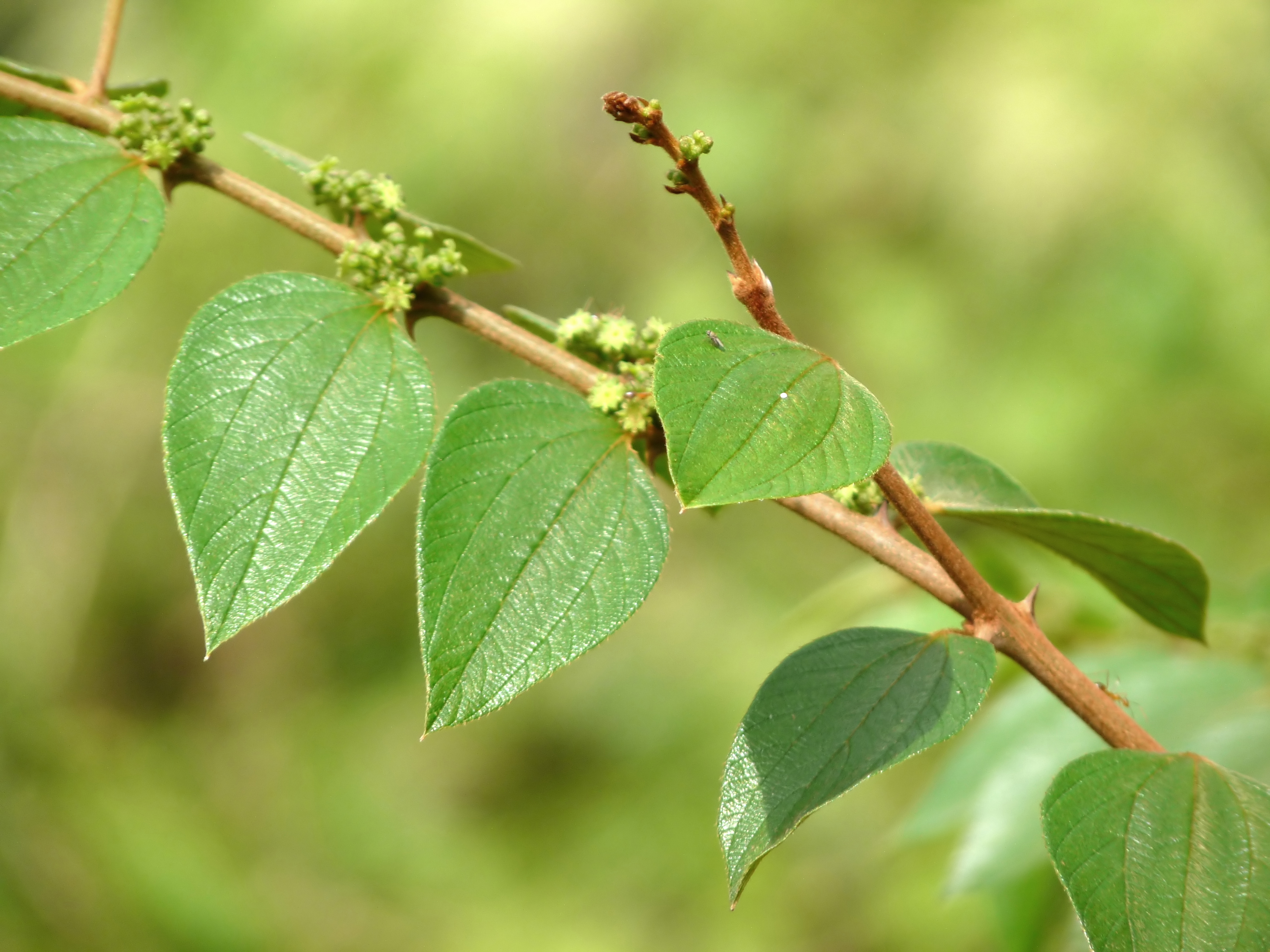
- Ziziphus oenopolia

Conservation status
- Least Concern (IUCN 3.1)

Scientific classification
- Kingdom: Plantae
- Clade: Tracheophytes
- Clade: Angiosperms
- Clade: Eudicots
- Clade: Rosids
- Order: Rosales
- Family: Rhamnaceae
- Genus: Ziziphus
- Species: Z. oenopolia

Binomial name
- Ziziphus oenopolia (L.) Mill.

Synonyms
- Synonymy: taxon; Girtanneria oenopolia (L.) Neck., opus utique oppr.; Hovenia inaequalis DC.; Rhamnus oenopolia L.; Rhamnus oenoplia L., orth. var.; Ziziphus albens Roxb.; Ziziphus celtidifolia DC.; Ziziphus ferruginea B.Heyne ex Wall., not validly publ.; Ziziphus latifolia Blanco in Fl. Filip., nom. illeg. homonym. post.; Ziziphus lotus Blanco, sensu auct.; Ziziphus oenopolia var. fasciculata Bhandari & Bhansali; Ziziphus oenopolia var. pallens Bhandari & Bhansali; Ziziphus oenopolia var. pedicellaris Bhandari & Bhansali; Ziziphus oligantha Merr. & L.M.Perry; Ziziphus pallens Wall., not validly publ.; Ziziphus pedicellala Wall., not validly publ.; Ziziphus rufula Miq.; Ziziphus scandens Roxb., nom. nud.

= Ziziphus oenopolia =

Species of flowering plant

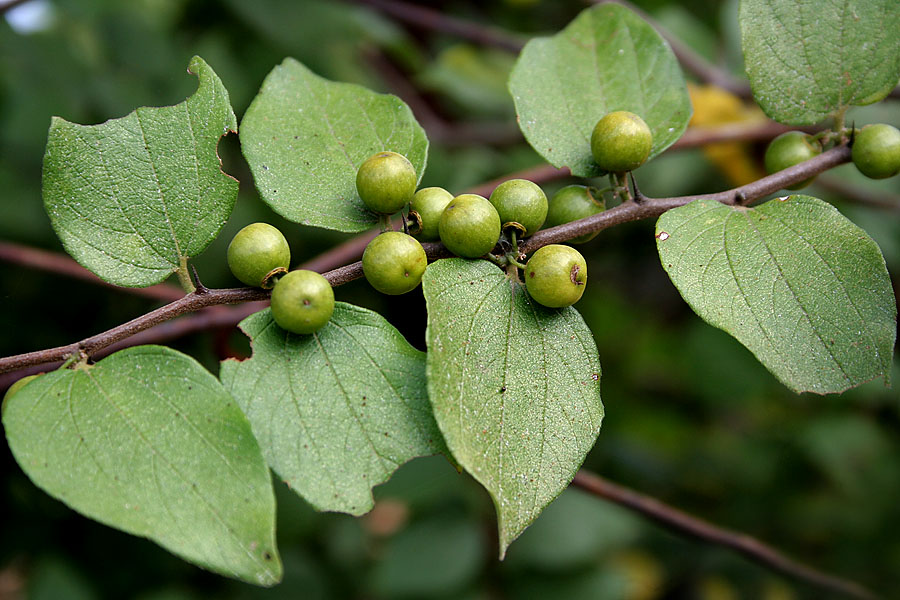
Leaves and fruits

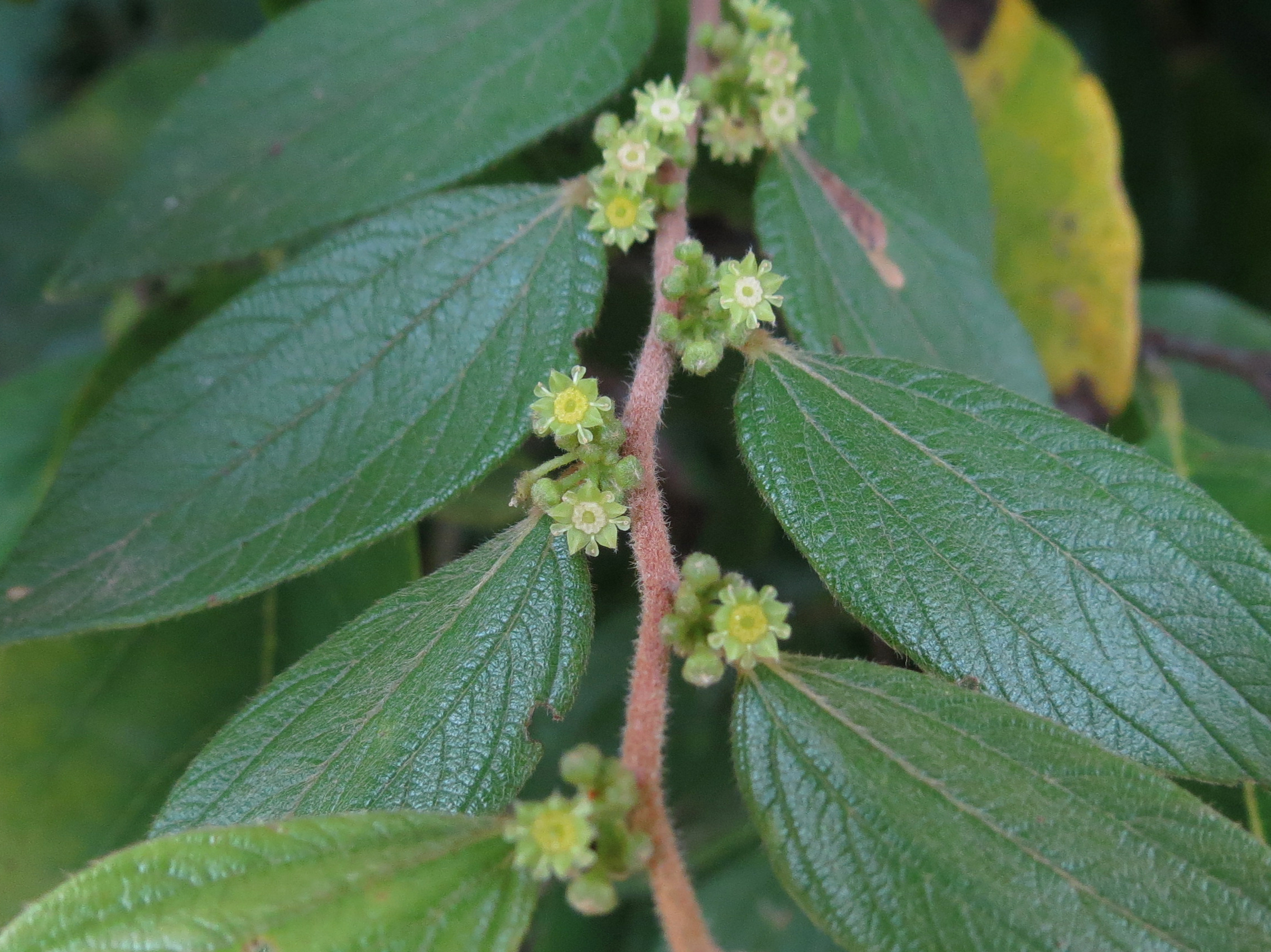
Flowers

Ziziphus oenopolia, commonly known as the jackal jujube, small-fruited jujube or wild jujube, is a flowering plant with a broad distribution through tropical and subtropical Asia and Australasia. In India, it is mostly found in the deciduous forests of the southern part of the country.

== Description ==
It is a spreading, sometimes climbing, thorny shrub growing to 1.5 m in height. The leaves are simple, alternate, ovate-lanceolate, acute and oblique. The flowers are green, in subsessile axillary cymes. The fruit is a globose drupe, black and shiny when ripe, containing a single seed. The leaf length is 4-6.5 cm, width is 2–3 cm.

== Distribution and habitat ==
It ranges from the Indian subcontinent through southern China, Indochina, Peninsular Malaysia, the Philippines, Lesser Sunda Islands, and New Guinea to northern Australia. It grows along roadside forests and thickets. Its flowering and fruiting season is June to February.

== Uses ==
The berries are edible and the bark is used for tanning.

=== Medicinal ===
The plant produces active phytochemicals, such as phenolics, alkaloids, terpenoids, flavonoids, tannins, and carbohydrates. The plant produces cyclopeptide alkaloids known as ziziphines. The stem, bark, leaves, fruit, and roots are used in Ayurveda for the treatment of various conditions, such as ulcers, stomach aches, obesity, and asthma. The stem bark has antioxidant properties. Bark and roots are used for anti-diabetic treatments. The Konkani people of Maharashtra use the chewed leaves as a dressing for wounds. In Burma the stem bark is used as a mouthwash for sore throats, for dysentery, and for inflammation of the uterus. Research in Thailand has found that extracts of ziziphine from Ziziphus oenopolia show antiplasmodial in vitro activity against the malarial parasite Plasmodium falciparum.

== Alternative names and Etymology ==
Linnaeus spelled the specific epithet as "oenoplia," "oenopolia," and "oenopia". When Miller transferred the genus from "Rhamnus" to "Ziziphus," he used "oenoplia."
