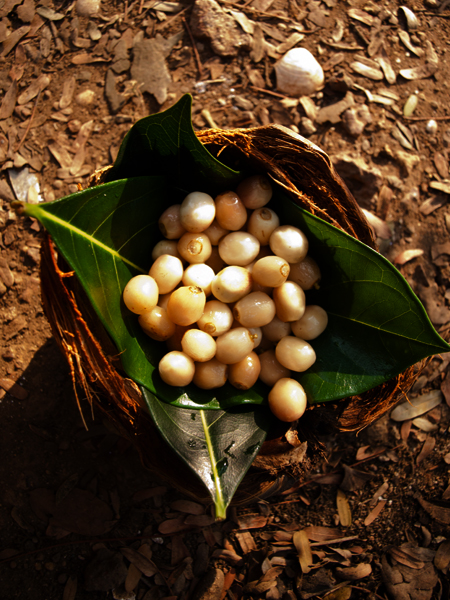
- Ziziphus rugosa, zunna berry

Conservation status
- Least Concern (IUCN 3.1)

Scientific classification
- Kingdom: Plantae
- Clade: Tracheophytes
- Clade: Angiosperms
- Clade: Eudicots
- Clade: Rosids
- Order: Rosales
- Family: Rhamnaceae
- Genus: Ziziphus
- Species: Z. rugosa

Binomial name
- Ziziphus rugosa Lam.

Varieties
- Ziziphus rugosa var. glabrescens Prain; Ziziphus rugosa var. harmandii Pierre; Ziziphus rugosa var. indoglabrescens Karthik. & V.S.Kumar; Ziziphus rugosa var. rugosa; Ziziphus rugosa var. siamensis Craib

= Ziziphus rugosa =

Species of tree

Ziziphus rugosa is a species of flowering plant in the family Rhamnaceae. It is a scrambling shrub or tree native to the Indian subcontinent, Indochina, and southern China.

The tree is native in Bangladesh, China (Hainan and southern and southwestern Yunnan), the central and eastern Himalayas (including Nepal and Bhutan), India, Laos, Myanmar, Pakistan, Sri Lanka, Thailand, and Vietnam. It grows in sparse forests and thickets on hills and mountains below 1,400 metres (4,600 ft) elevation.

The berry-sized fruit is known in India as zunna berry, chunna fruit or churna fruit. The population of Western Ghats in India collect the fruits (berries) for self consumption and sale. The berries are popularly known as 'Toran'तोरण in Marathi language.

Its bark and wood are used medicinally for dysentery in Laos.
