= Todos los Santos Lake =

Lake in Los Lagos Region, Chile

Lake Todos los Santos
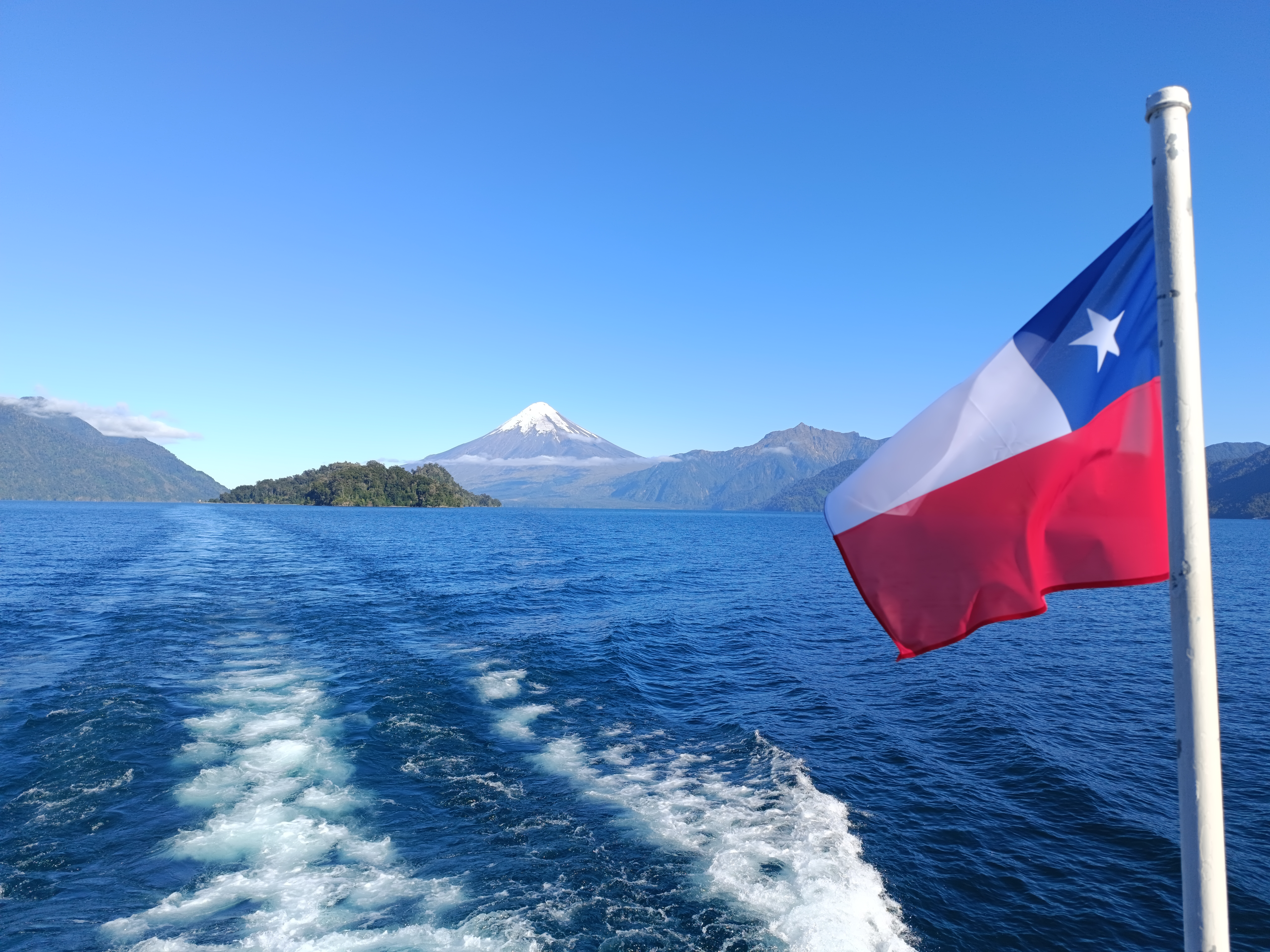

- Location within Los Lagos
- Location: Llanquihue Province
- Coordinates: 41°06′S 72°12′W
- Type: monomictic
- Catchment area: 3,036 km^{2} (1,172 sq mi)
- Basin countries: Chile
- Max. length: 32 km (20 mi)
- Max. width: 16 km (9.9 mi)
- Surface area: 178.5 km^{2} (68.9 sq mi)
- Average depth: 190 m (620 ft)
- Max. depth: 337 m (1,106 ft)
- Water volume: 33.9 km^{3} (8.1 cu mi)
- Residence time: 4 years
- Surface elevation: 189 m (620 ft)
- Islands: one (Isla Margarita)

Lake Todos los Santos (Spanish for "All Saints Lake") is a lake located in the Los Lagos Region of southern Chile, 96 km northeast of the regional capital Puerto Montt and 76 km east of Puerto Varas, within the boundaries of the Vicente Pérez Rosales National Park. It has a surface area of 178.5 km² and a maximum depth of 337 m. The Lake's National Park status has ensured protection to its environment. The catchment is largely covered with old-growth Valdivian temperate rain forests. The present form of the lake is the result of glacial and volcanic processes.

== Hydrology ==
The main tributary of the lake is the Río Peulla/Río Negro, next to the Peulla locality. Its outflow at the Petrohué locality gives rise to the Petrohué River, with an average outflow of 270 m³ per second. Even though the lake has a regulating effect, it is subject to water level variations that may exceed 3 m and reflect in the discharge at the outflow. At a short distance from the Petrohué locality, the river flows through the Petrohué Waterfalls.

The lake may appear green, blue or silver depending on the cloud cover and weather on a given day. The majority of the greenish tint comes from glacial meltwater containing mineral debris.

== History ==
As recently as 20,000 years ago, the basin of Todos los Santos Lake was filled by a large glacier that did not withdraw until approximately 10,000 years ago. At that point, the area was still a glacial basin with rivers flowing through it. The lake itself did not form until lava flows from the Osorno and Calbuco volcanoes formed a dam across the lower part of the valley, trapping the water from the rivers and gradually forming the lake.

This lake has been known by multiple indigenous names in the past: Purailla, Pichilauquen, and Quechocavi. German colonists in the 19th century labelled it Lake Esmeralda ("Emerald Lake"), due to the green color of its water. However, later practice reverted to the name given by Jesuit missionaries, Todos los Santos Lake.

== Tourism ==
A regular road and boat transport service provides tourist transport between Puerto Montt or Puerto Varas in Chile and San Carlos de Bariloche on Nahuel Huapi Lake in Argentina. There are two main lake ports: Petrohué at the western end, and the village of Peulla at the eastern end; there is no road connecting these ports. The lake is surrounded by steep mountains leaving only minor plains. The mountains include Osorno volcano in the west, the Puntiagudo to the north, and the Tronador to the east.

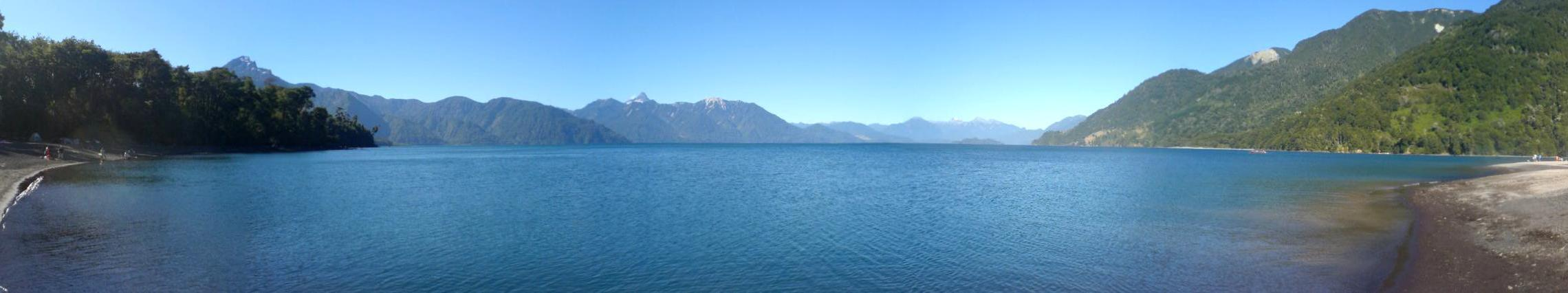
View from a camping in the west side of the lake, near Petrohué River
