= El Bosque Urban Park =

Protected area in Chile

- Parque Urbano El Bosque
- Location within Chile
- Location: Los Ríos Region, Chile
- Nearest city: Valdivia
- Coordinates: 39°50′23.93″S 73°14′35.38″W
- Area: 10.5 ha (26 acres)
- Established: 1997
- Governing body: Comité Ecológico Lemu Lahuen

El Bosque Urban Park (Spanish: Parque Urbano El Bosque) is a protected wetland and forest in the city of Valdivia, south-central Chile. The park is owned by the real estate company SOCOVESA that developed the adjacent neighborhood of El Bosque. The park originated in 1997 as a private park open only to residents of the neighborhood. It was opened to the public in 2004, the same year administration was transferred to the ad-hoc organisation Comité Ecológico Lemu Lahuen.

== See also ==
- Área Costera Protegida Punta Curiñanco
- Oncol Park
- Punucapa
- Urban Wetlands Law
