= Eupithecia valdivia =

Scientific classification
- Kingdom: Animalia
- Phylum: Arthropoda
- Class: Insecta
- Order: Lepidoptera
- Family: Geometridae
- Genus: Eupithecia
- Species: E. valdivia

Binomial name
- Eupithecia valdivia Rindge, 1987

Species of moth

Eupithecia valdivia is a moth in the family Geometridae. It is found in the region of Los Lagos (Valdivia Province) in Chile. Its habitat is the Valdivian temperate rain forest.

The length of the forewings is about 10 mm. Adults have been recorded on wing in October.

== Etymology ==
The specific name is based on the type locality.
