= Ecotourism in the Valdivian temperate rainforest =

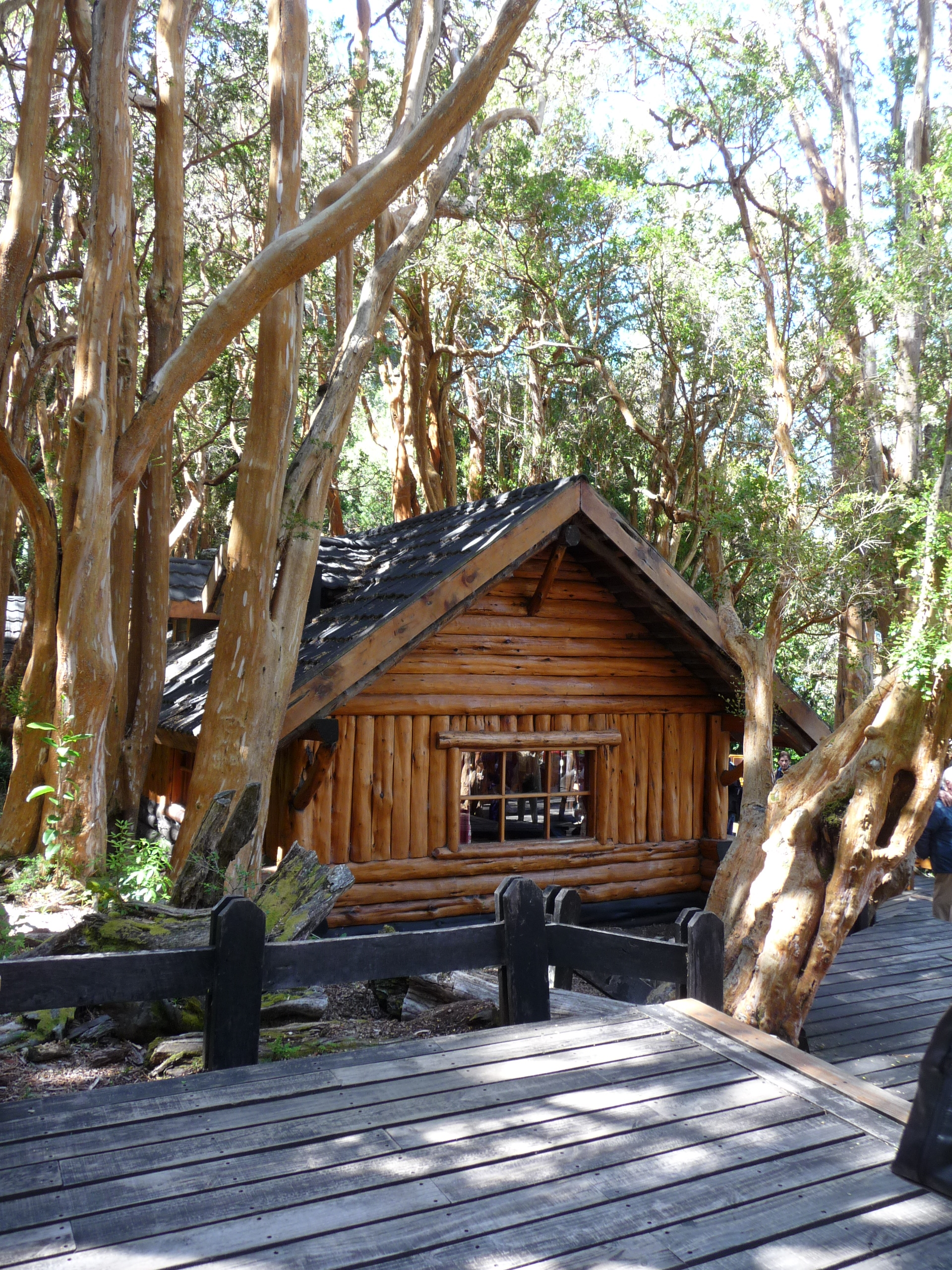
A tourist lodge in Los Arrayanes National Park.

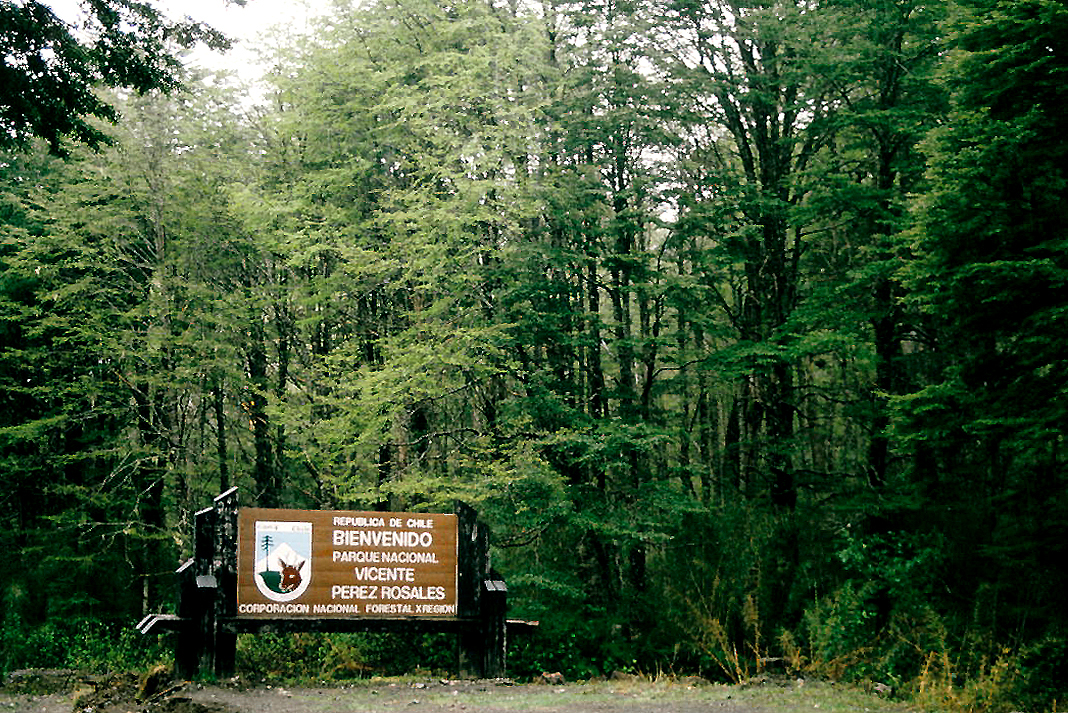
Tourist signage in Vicente Pérez Rosales National Park.

Valdivia Temperate Rainforest is an area between 36 and 47° S. consisting of a majority of the country Chile and a small part of Argentina totaling about 12.7 million hectares. The Valdivian forest is one of the few forested regions in the world with climate conditions to be considered a temperate climate. Its ecological systems provide habitat for a clustering of some of the highest biodiversity in the world. Many of the species are endemic to Valdivia and are descendants of Gondwana Species. For example, Araucaria araucana or "Monkey Puzzle Tree", and Fitzroya cupressoides "Alerce". Due to the region's unique landscape and biodiversity millions of visitors come to the area annually. National Parks in the region provide opportunities for many tourism operations. In an effort to help preserve and expand conserved areas Ecotourism or Sustainable Tourism plays a vital role. The economic benefits affect not only the park areas but also the local communities. Ecotourism accounts for 4.6% of Chile's GNP.

Since the 1980s Chile has been promoting ecotourism, and has seen annual increases in both visitors and income occur every year since. Between 2006 and 2007 visitor numbers increased from 2.25 million to 2.5 million. Revenue from ecotourism services and national parks results in a 2-3% increase in gross income. Through the year 43% of tourists visit national parks in the regions of de los Rios and de los Lagos. The top three destinations in those areas are the Coguillio National Park, the Villarica National Park, and the Vicente Pérez Rosales National Park. The last of those hosts 25% of all visitors to Chile.

== Protected areas ==
Approximately 14.1 million hectares of the Valdivian forest is in the Chilean government conservation park system SNASPE. La Corporación Nacional Foresta (CONAF), a Chilean government agency under the Ministry of Agriculture, make decision on forest policies and sustainable forest management. Funding is provided by several sources including government funding, park fees, and private investments. SNASEP conservation land is divided into four different categories (1) Virgin Region Reserve (2) National Park (3) National Reserve (4) National Monument. Within National Parks CONAF identifies and assigns land into six different zones:

- Intangible
- Primitive
- Extensive
- Intensive
- Special Use
- Recuperation

Each of these zones have guidelines as to status and type of ecosystem and what kinds of activities may take place within that zone. Intangible and Primitive zones have little to no human interaction, although some allowances are made for scientific research and education purposes. Extensive zones act as separation between other zones and infrastructure such as major road ways. Intensive and Special Use zones have experienced the heaviest recreation traffic and supporting infrastructure. These can include service and recreation facilities, as well as administration buildings. Recuperation zone is an interim designation, assigned to areas that have experienced a major disturbance and are in the process of recovering vegetation.

A majority of protected land is in small holdings. These tracts are held in the hands of private owners and are not included in an inventory of lands. Some private buyers buy land to help protect it. Recent numbers show land bought for conservation by private owners Doug and Kris Tompkins totals around .5 million hectares. Recently Chile "establish[ed] the first Marine and Coastal Protected Areas, including one along the Valdivian coastline, to increase the amount of protected coastline."

== Ecotour excursions ==
Excursions generally fall under one of two categories: organized or independent. Organized excursions are booked through a tour company and include any of the following activities: sport fishing, whale watching, zip lining, and guided bird watches. These types of tours are the most effective way to increase exposure to an area. Local visitors and independent travelers participate in activities such as camping and hiking that is not an officially organized event.

The coastal waters off the coast of Valdivia offer many opportunities to experience its unique marine ecosystem. For example, sport fishing is a growing million dollar enterprise. The vital whale feeding and breeding habitat off of Chiloe Island is a big draw for tourists to see whales up close. Other companies offer trekking on sections of the Patagonia Icefield. Lodges and overnight options are available through various local and international companies.

== Local and indigenous peoples ==
The land of the indigenous Huilliche and Pehuenche people offers many opportunities for ecotourism development. Like many local communities sustainable tourism provides a supplementary form of income. Through various services and operations tourism not only boosts the economy but also provides an environment to educate and share local and traditional culture and knowledge about ecological systems and management. Such models as Community Based EcoTourism (CBET) encompasses a variety of organizational set ups (networks, co-ops, and associations etc.) which help communities work with other organizations to maximize resources and facilitate communication. Such infrastructure allows open channels of communication and exchange of resources between people on the ground and larger organizations such as NGOs.

In order to maintain constant revenue, a community must not become a monoeconomy which could collapse in the event of economic downturn. Communities must manage the increased pressure to put stress on natural resources to accommodate visitor numbers. There is also a need to ensure that money stays in the local economy by reducing the number of international companies or their scope in the tourism. When it comes to policy making, small communities benefit greater from bottom up government, by reducing opportunities for exploitation of natural resources and by preserving the integrity of the flora and fauna.

== Problems and solutions ==
The Chilean government spends a significant amount of resources promoting ecotourism. A major critique by researchers is that the support for planning and management is not sufficient. There is a need for an increase in the number of park rangers, as well for additional planning and management training and education, in particular training with a higher emphasis on science/biology/ecology and humanities. Agencies such as the US Forest Service provides training for park rangers and gives planning and management advice. Research by graduate students from the University of North Carolina have evaluated accredited (by National Recreation and Park Association (NRPA) or Society of American Foresters (SAF)). There are also park and recreation degree programs from various universities through the US and internationally whose researchers have included interviews and surveys performed by Chilean park managers. These programs stress the importance of communication skills, multilateral cooperation, natural resource management, and outdoor recreation service skills. Another problem with the park system is the lack of stable money flow. Some of park funding comes from the government. However an increasing amount comes from private investment, which can fluctuate. Also, private investment comes with political and social pressures that may or may not be in the best interest for the goal of conservation. With the growing economic incentive of ecotourism increasing numbers of foreign companies move into and circulate revenue out of the Chilean economy.
