= Puntiagudo-Cordón Cenizos =

Mountain in Chile

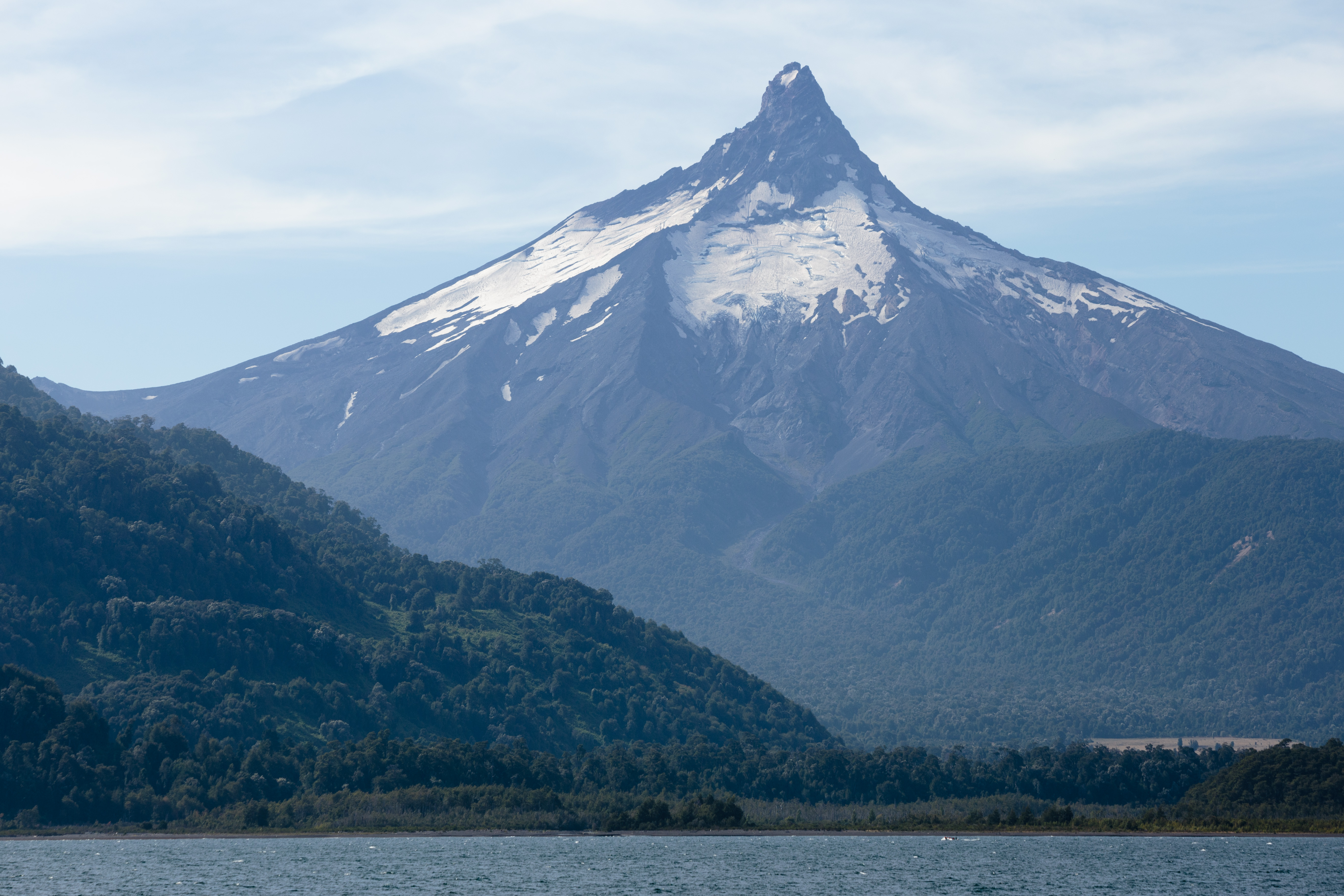
- Puntiagudo as seen on February 22, 2015.

Highest point
- Elevation: 2,493 m (8,179 ft)
- Coordinates: 40°58′10″S 72°15′50″W

Geography
- Location: Chile
- Parent range: Andes

Geology
- Mountain type: Stratovolcano
- Last eruption: 1850

Puntiagudo-Cordón Cenizos (Spanish pronunciation: [puntjaˈɣuðo koɾˈðon seˈnisos]) is a snow-capped volcanic chain located in the Andes, in Los Lagos Region of Chile, near Volcán Osorno. It lies between Rupanco Lake and Todos los Santos Lake. "Volcán Puntiagudo" (Spanish for "Sharp-pointed volcano") is a stratovolcano with a prominent 2,493 m high sharp-pointed summit that results from glacial dissection and gets its name from this feature. According to locals, the Puntiagudo volcano lost some of its sharp point in the earthquake of 1960 (9.4–9.6 Mw). So the volcano was more pointed than it is today. Puntiagudo is also given the name Cerro Cenizas.

Puntiagudo is partially contained within Vicente Pérez Rosales National Park.

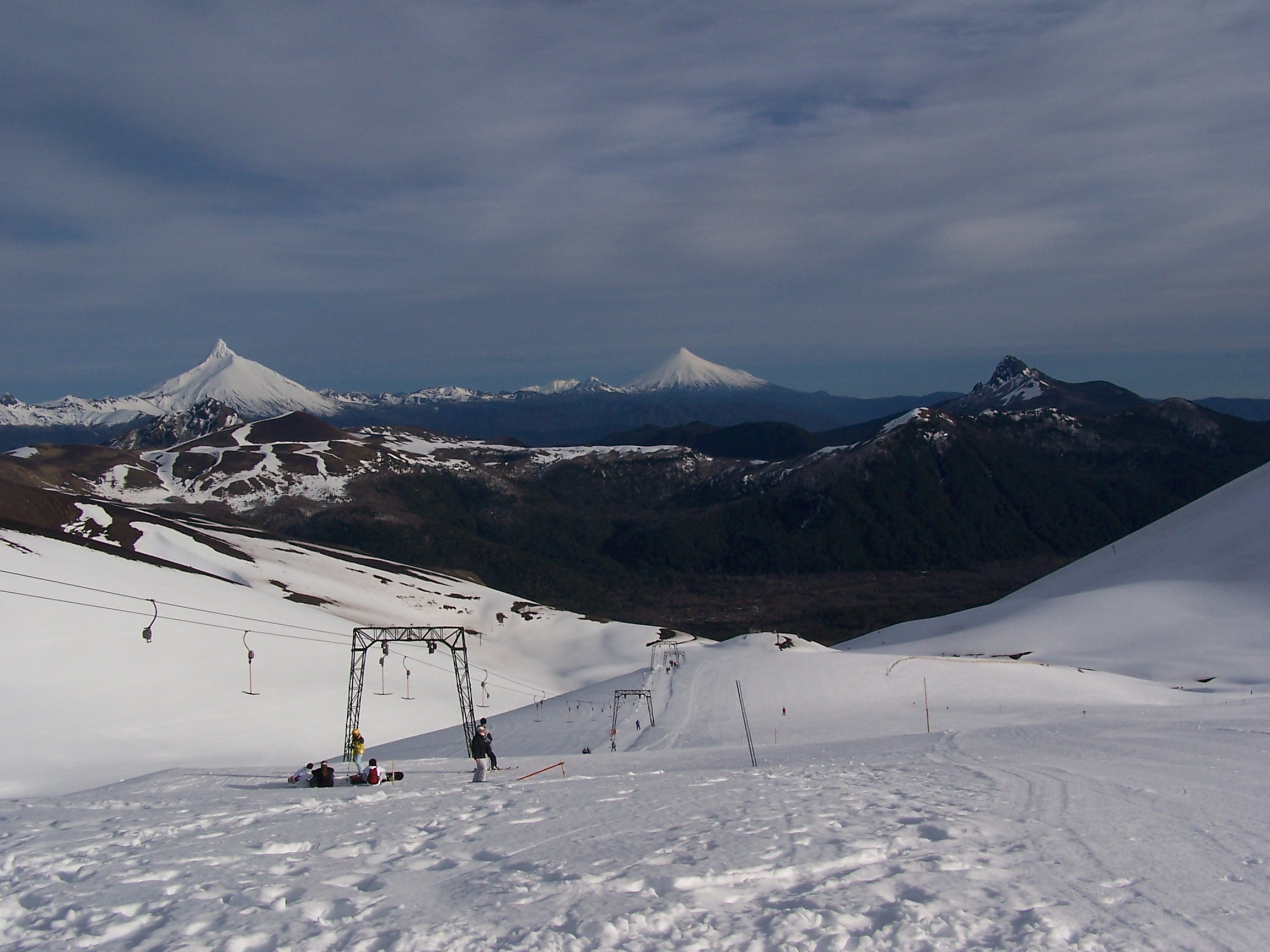
Puntiagudo (left) and Osorno volcanoes viewed from Antillanca

== See also ==
- List of volcanoes in Chile
