= Oncol Park =

Protected area in Chile

- Location within Chile
- Location: Los Ríos Region, Chile
- Nearest city: Valdivia
- Coordinates: 39°42′23″S 73°18′22″W
- Area: 393 km^{2} (152 sq mi)

Oncol Park (Spanish: Parque Oncol) is a natural reserve located 32 km (20 mi) from the city of Valdivia, Chile.

== Description ==
The park has an area of 7.54 km^{2} (3 sq mi) of which most lies on Cerro Oncol (715 m), the highest peak of the Valdivian Coast Range, but is only 5 km (3 mi) from the coast. Oncol Park is located in an area of 15 km^{2} (6 sq mi) of continuous Valdivian temperate rain forest. From the peak of Cerro Oncol it is possible to see Llaima, Villarrica and even Tronador on the international border of Chile and Argentina. The park is property of the wood pulp enterprise Celulosa Arauco y Constitución.

== See also ==
- Área Costera Protegida Punta Curiñanco
- Carlos Anwandter Nature Sanctuary
- El Bosque Urban Park
