= Petrohué River =

River in Chile

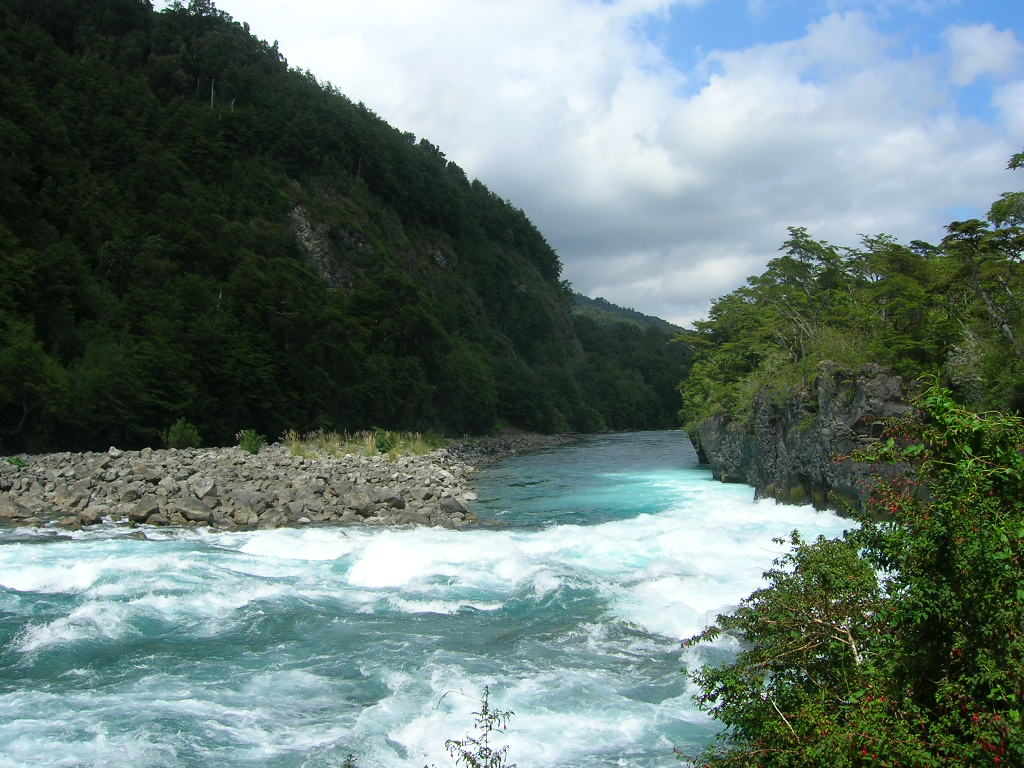
- The river features emerald color water.

- Location of source

Location
- Country: Chile

Physical characteristics
- Source
  - location: Todos los Santos Lake
  - coordinates: 41°8′22.97″S 72°24′1.1″W
- Mouth
  - location: Reloncaví Estuary
- Length: 36 km (22 mi)
- Basin size: 2,868 km^{2} (1,107 sq mi)

Petrohué River (Spanish pronunciation: [petɾoˈwe]) is a Chilean river located in the Los Lagos Region of Chile. It originates from Todos los Santos Lake in the Vicente Pérez Rosales National Park. At its origin are the Petrohué Waterfalls.

== Sport fishing ==
The Petrohue River is well known for its recreational fishing; the fishing season begins in November and ends in May.

Species found in the river include:

- Chinook salmon
- Brown trout
- Rainbow trout
- Atlantic salmon
- Coho salmon
- Perca trout
