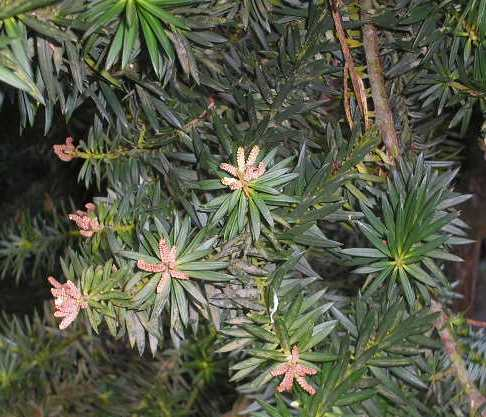

Conservation status
- Near Threatened (IUCN 3.1)

Scientific classification
- Kingdom: Plantae
- Clade: Tracheophytes
- Clade: Gymnosperms
- Division: Pinophyta
- Class: Pinopsida
- Order: Araucariales
- Family: Podocarpaceae
- Genus: Podocarpus
- Species: P. nubigenus

Binomial name
- Podocarpus nubigenus Lindl.

Synonyms
- Nageia nubigena (Lindl.) F.Muell.; Saxegothaea gracilis Gordon & Glend.

= Podocarpus nubigenus =

Species of conifer

Podocarpus nubigenus is a species of conifer in the family Podocarpaceae, endemic to the Valdivian temperate forests of southern Chile and adjacent southwestern Argentina. It is the southernmost podocarp in the world. It grows from 38°S to Ultima Esperanza (53°S), in wet and swampy soils. It can settle clear grounds, with a faster growth than the other Chilean Podocarpaceae.

It is a medium to large tree, growing to around 20–25 metres (66–82 feet), exceptionally to 35 m (115 ft). The bark peels off in papery flakes, with a purplish to golden brown hue. The sharp, green, needle-like leaves are stiff and leathery, 2 cm long. The cones are highly modified with two to four fused, fleshy, berry-like, juicy scales, bright red when mature, bearing one (rarely two) rounded seeds at the apex of the scales.

In a classic example species-pair of the Antarctic flora, it is very closely related to Podocarpus totara from New Zealand, to the extent that if planted together, they are very difficult to distinguish. The best distinction is the slightly brighter green tone of the leaves, compared to the more greyish-green of P. totara.

== Cultivation and uses ==
The wood is hard and straight grained, and very resistant to rot; it is yellow with reddish marks, semiheavy, semihard, and resistant to decay, but due to scarcity, is little used.

P. nubigenus is occasionally grown as an ornamental tree in the western British Isles and the Pacific Northwest of North America, where it receives the cool summers and high rainfall it requires for successful growth. This tree is tolerant to about −25 °C (−13 °F). It does not have any common English name; cloud podocarp' (a translation of the scientific name); male maniu (a literal translation from the most common name in Chile), Chilean podocarp, and Chilean totara have been suggested, but are little used. Mapuche Native American and Latin American Spanish names include and mañio macho or mañíu macho and huililahuán (Spanish pronunciation: [wililaˈwan]). In southern Chile, it is also known as mañío de hojas punzantes (which is translated as prickly-leaved maniu).

== Etymology ==
Podocarpus is derived from Greek and means 'stalked fruit'. The name is in reference to the distinctive shape of the fruit stalks of some species.

The species epithet nubigenus means 'cloud-born' or 'cloud-formed'.
