= Las Vertientes Private Nature Reserve =

Private nature reserve in Patagonia, Chile

Las Vertientes Private Nature Reserve (Reserva Natural Privada)
- IUCN category II (national park)
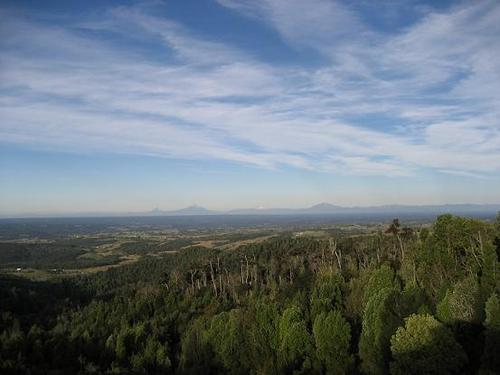
- Outlook over Las Vertientes reserve.
- Interactive map of Las Vertientes Private Nature Reserve (Reserva Natural Privada)
- Location: Los Lagos Region, Chile
- Nearest city: Los Muermos
- Coordinates: 41°19′54″S 73°39′37″W
- Area: 100 km^{2} (39 sq mi)
- Established: 2009
- Governing body: Corporación Nacional Forestal

Las Vertientes Private Nature Reserve (Spanish: Reserva Natural Privada Las Vertientes) is a private Chilean nature reserve located in the Los Lagos Region, part of Chilean Patagonia. Created in 2009 as a nature reserve operated by the Corporación Nacional Forestal, its purpose is to protect the plants and animals of the Valdivian temperate rainforest. The 100 square kilometres (39 mi^{2}) reserve's work emphasizes restoration of the temperate rainforest ecosystem over being a public amenity. It is the only private protected area in Los Muermos.

== History ==
Las Vertientes Private Nature Reserve was formed by a renowned artist and architect with the help of his family, aiming to promote wildlife conservation and environmental education for the children of Northern Patagonia.

The Las Vertientes Private Nature Reserve's nursery roots go back to 2008 when the owners began growing native plants in response to local environmental issues. Native ecosystems were being destroyed through forest clearance and the development of subdivisions. The family saw the need to reverse these destructive trends and started propagating native species as a hobby.

== Biota ==
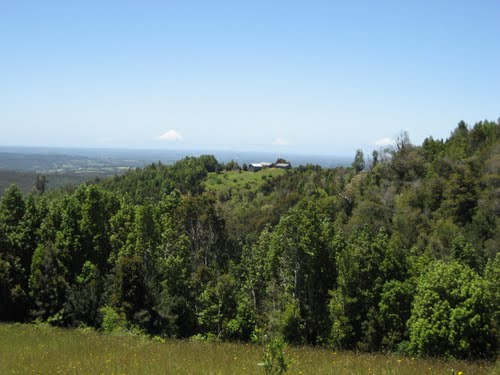
Valdivian temperate rainforest at Las Vertientes.

Fauna

Some of the endangered fauna that can be found in the Las Vertientes nature reserve include Monito del monte (Dromiciops gliroides), Southern pudú (Pudu puda), Puma (Puma concolor), Kodkod (Leopardus guigna), and the Magellanic Woodpecker (Campephilus magellanicus).

Flora

Some of the endangered flora that can be seen in the Valdivian temperate rainforest of the Las Vertientes nature reserve include: Copihue trees (Lapageria rosea), Murta shrub (Ugni Molinae), Olivillo trees (Aextoxicon punctatum), and the Alerce trees (Fitzroya cupressoides).
