= Petrohué Waterfalls =

Coordinates: 41.17235°S 72.44683°W

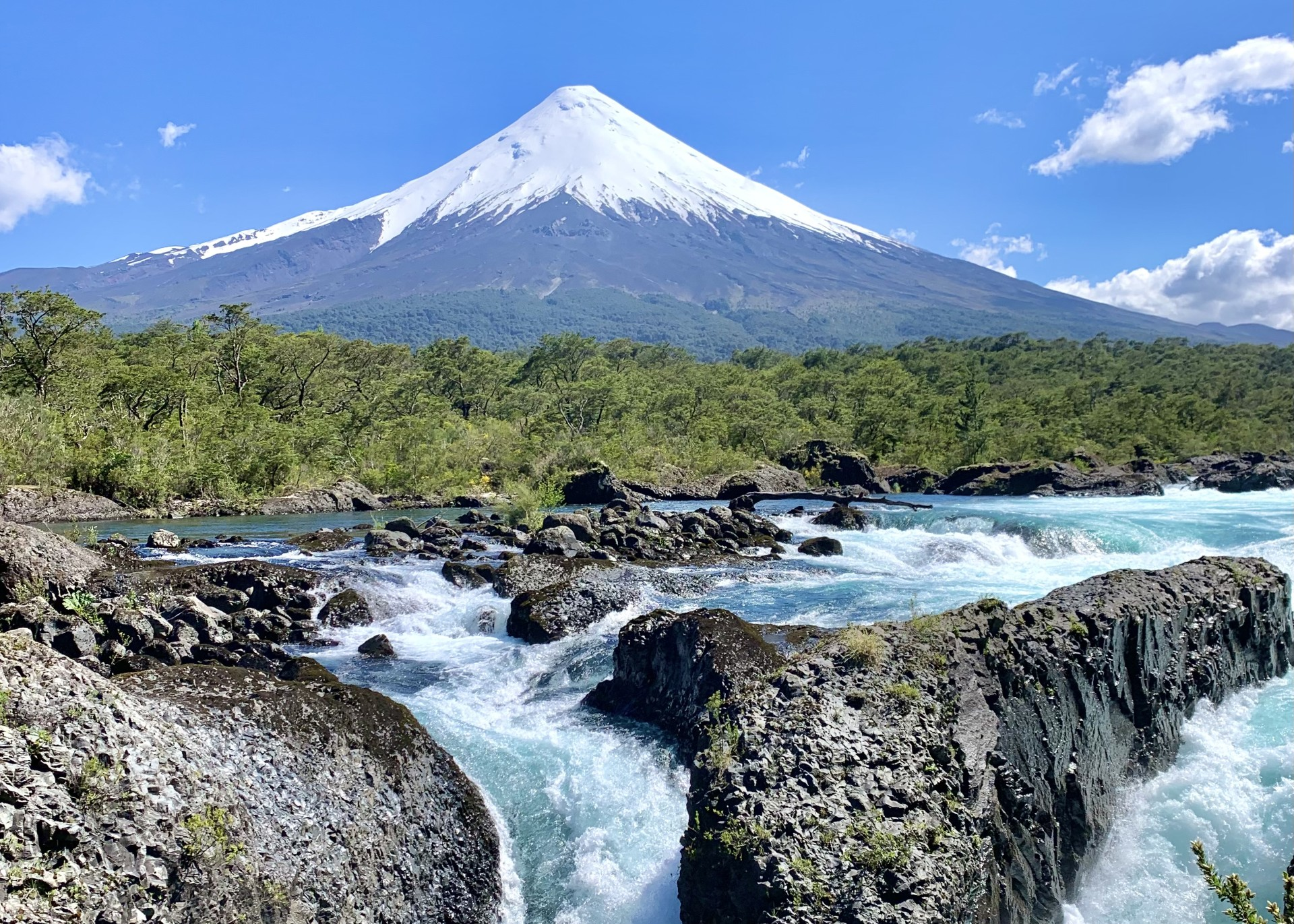
Saltos del Petrohué with Osorno volcano in the background.

Petrohué Waterfalls (pronounced petro-WEH; Spanish: Saltos del Petrohué) is a chute-type waterfall in the upper reach of Petrohué River in Chile, a short distance downstream of the source of this river in Todos los Santos Lake. This waterfall is inside the Vicente Pérez Rosales National Park, close to the road leading to the Petrohue locality on lake Todos los Santos.

The waterfall is supported by basaltic lava (andesite) stemming from the Osorno Volcano that sits in between Todos los Santos and Llanquihue Lake. The average water flow of these falls is of 270 cubic metres (350 cu yd) per second, but it can be much larger during the rainy season when the surface level of lake Todos los Santos rises by up to 3 meters. The water, decanted in the lake, is usually clear with a green hue; however, occasionally, when lahars descending from the volcano are active, water at the falls can be loaded with sand and silt. Transport of these abrasive materials explains the polished aspect of the rocks.

== See also ==
- List of waterfalls
