= Vicente Pérez Rosales National Park =

National park of Chile

- IUCN category II (national park)
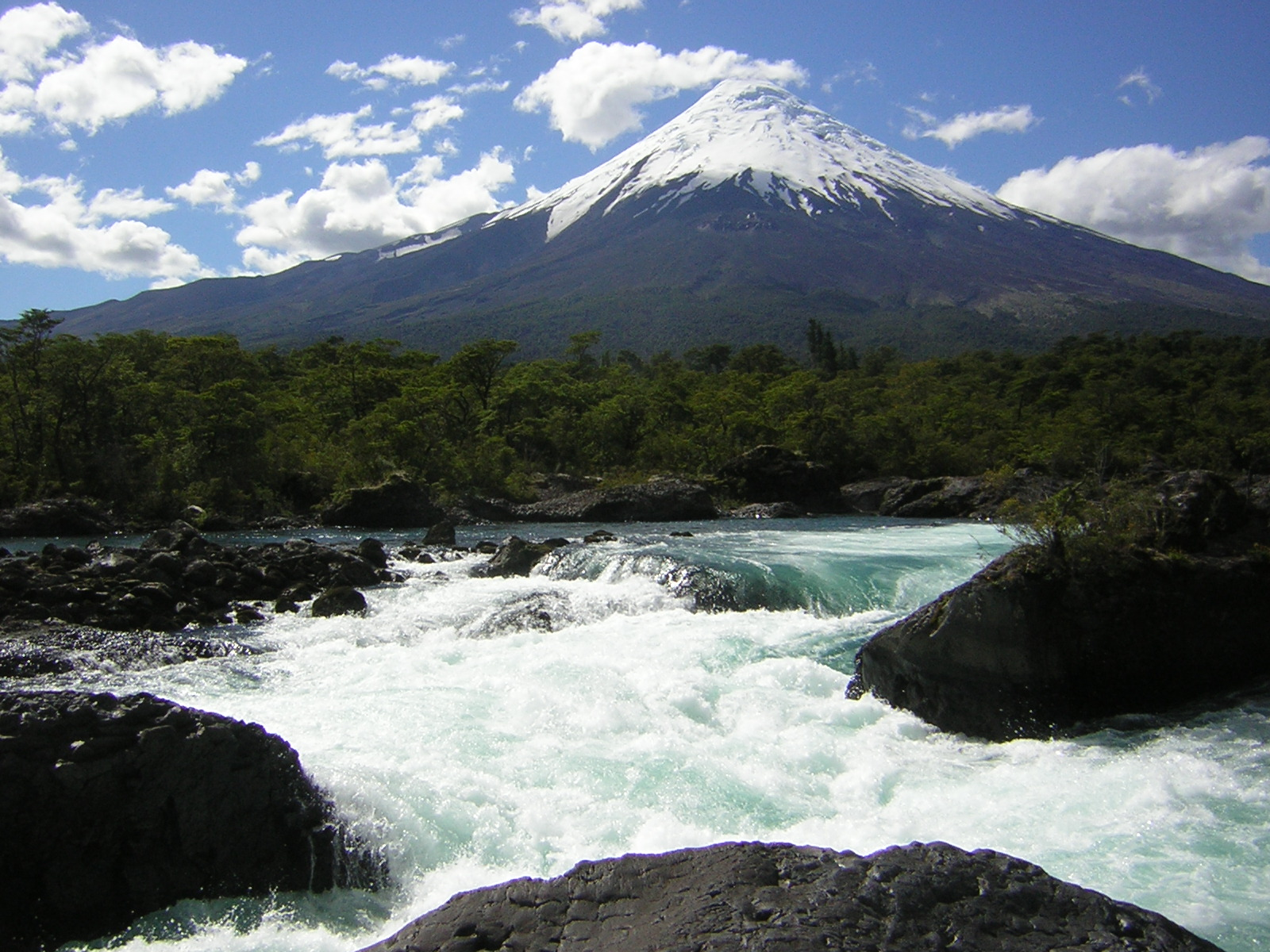
- Petrohué Waterfalls (Saltos del Petrohué)

- Location within Chile
- Location: Los Lagos Region, Chile
- Nearest city: Puerto Varas
- Coordinates: 41°08′30″S 72°10′23″W
- Area: 2,530 km^{2} (977 sq mi)
- Established: 1926
- Visitors: 332,334 (in 2012)
- Governing body: Corporación Nacional Forestal

Vicente Pérez Rosales National Park (Spanish pronunciation: [biˈsente ˈpeɾes roˈsales]) is located in Los Lagos Region, Llanquihue Province, of Chile. Its western entrance is close to the Ensenada locality, 82 km (51 mi) northeast of the provincial capital of Puerto Montt, and 64 km (40 mi) from Puerto Varas along Ruta CH-225. This national park covers about 2,530 km^{2} (977 sq mi) and is almost entirely in the Andes mountain chain. The adjacent national parks Vicente Pérez Rosales and Puyehue National Park in Chile, and Nahuel Huapi National Park and Lanín National Park in Argentina, provide a continuous protected area of close to 15,000 km^{2} (5,792 sq mi).

The park protects the body of Todos los Santos Lake and a large part of its catchment. The outlet of the lake at the Petrohué locality gives rise to the Petrohué River. A short distance downstream, still within the limits of the Park, the Petrohué river flows through the Petrohue Waterfalls. The park also contains the eastern slope of Volcan Osorno, the southern slope of the Puntiagudo and the western slopes of the Tronador, with a maximum altitude of 3,491 m (11,453 ft). These mountains with year round snow give a strong imprint to the landscape.

A summary of geographical and limnological data for lake Todos los Santos is found in the database of the International Lake Environment Committee.

== Climate ==
Dirección Meteorológica de Chile (Chilean Meteorological Service) published a climate summary for the 10th Region . Average annual precipitation in the Petrohué area (lat 41°08'S), at an elevation of 700 m (2,297 ft), is around 4,000 mm (157 in). Precipitation on the Lake surface is around 3,000 to 4,000 mm (118 to 157 in) while on the western slope of the mountains it may reach 5,000 mm (197 in) per year. The predominant air flow is from west to east and the mass of air, when lifted over the mountains, releases precipitation. Eastern slopes tend to receive less rainfall. The most rainy months are June, July and August, while the least rain is recorded in January, February and March. Average annual temperature at the inhabited levels, 3,000 to 4,000 mm (118 to 157 in) altitude, is around 11 to 12 °C (52 to 54 °F). Above 1,000 m (3,281 ft) altitude, snow persists for most of the year. During the warm summer months, average daily maximum temperature may be around 25 °C (77 °F). Vegetation growth extends over approximately 6 months of the year.

== Geology ==
The geological substratum of the Park area is generally Granodiorite, an igneous rock. Except for recent sediments and volcanic cinders, no old sedimentary rocks appears anywhere in the Park. Through the igneous rock substratum, a number of stratovolcanoes have emerged. The Tronador and related structures are the result of volcanic activity dating back to the early Pleistocene. At the western entrance to the Park, the symmetrical cone of the Osorno volcano forms a towering landmark over the Todos los Santos and Llanquihue lakes. The peak of the Osorno is at 2,652 m (8,701 ft). The Osorno built up on top of an older stratovolcano, La Picada, which has a 6-km-wide caldera now mostly buried. The Puntiagudo is a stratovolcano with a sharp peak whose summit is at 2,493 m (8,179 ft). From the Puntiagudo to the northeast for 18 km (11 mi) extends a fissure that has given birth to 40-odd basaltic scoria cones. The Cayutue La Vigueria volcanic field consists of some 20 maars and cinder cones, of which Volcan Cayutue is the principal. The activity of Volcan Cayutue filled the Cayutue depression and separated the Todos los santos lake from the Ralun estuary. Lava flows from these volcanoes is basaltic and andesitic. Their activity is generally explosive and lava flows are highly viscous. A summary of scientific information on the volcanoes of the Park (Osorno, Puntiagudo-Cordón Cenizos and La Viguería) is available from the Global Volcanism Program of the Smithsonian Institution.

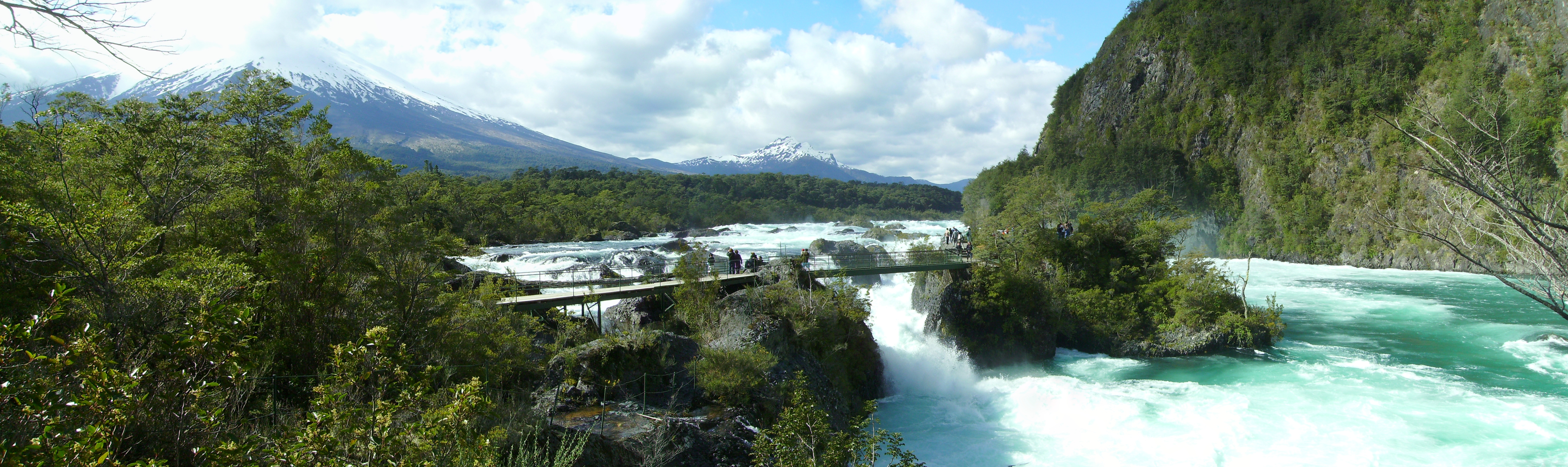
Panoramic view of Petrohue waterfalls

A second major factor that shaped the landscape was the action of glaciers during the ice age. Huge glaciers descended from the Tronador and found the way through the Todos los Santos valley far into the Central Valley of Chile. The glaciers removed practically all sediments that had deposited earlier. At exposed capes, visitors can observe the scratches left by stones carried by the glacier on the denuded surface of the granite opposing the flow of the glacier.

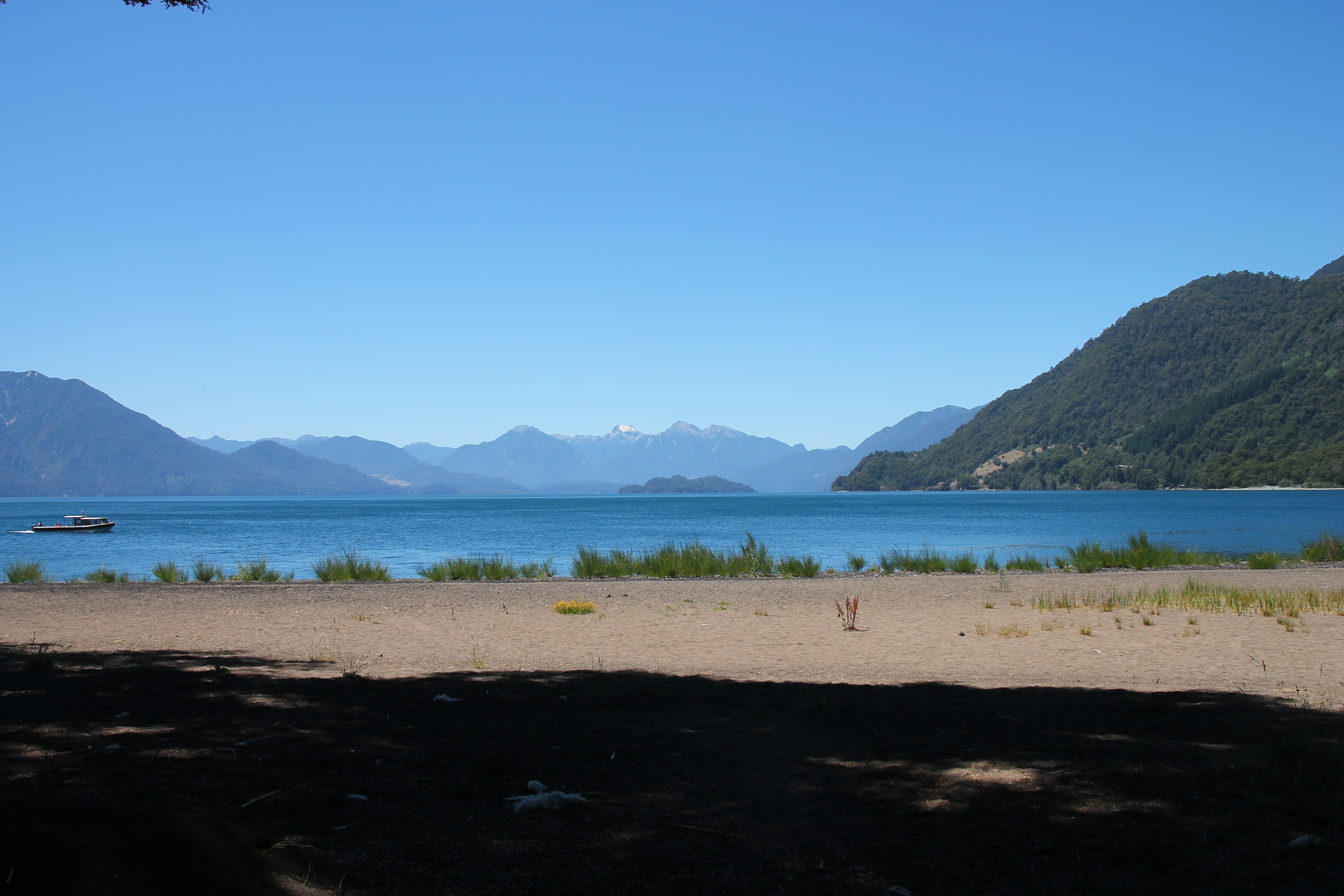
View of Todos los Santos Lake

Volcanoes were active during the retreating phase of the ice age. Some geologists postulate that Lake Todos los Santos and Llanquihue were just one lake in which the Osorno volcano built up until the two water bodies were separated. From then on, lake Todos los Santos had its surface level lifted as successive lava flows from the Osorno blocked the outlet of the lake. At the Petrohue waterfalls, one sees the river flow over such a constraining andesite lava flow. The steep left bank of the river is granodiorite. These volcanoes expel large quantities of loose cinder that in depositing give the rounded conic shape. These cinders are easily washed away by rain and surface water flow, so that the Puntiagudo, an elder brother of the Osorno, is denuded to the hard core of lava frozen inside the volcanic chimney.

In a recent geological if not historical event, rocks of volcanic origin raised the Ensenada depression between the Osorno and the Calbuco volcanoes, thus forcing the Llanquihue lake to open a new outlet to the sea on its western shore.

== Flora ==
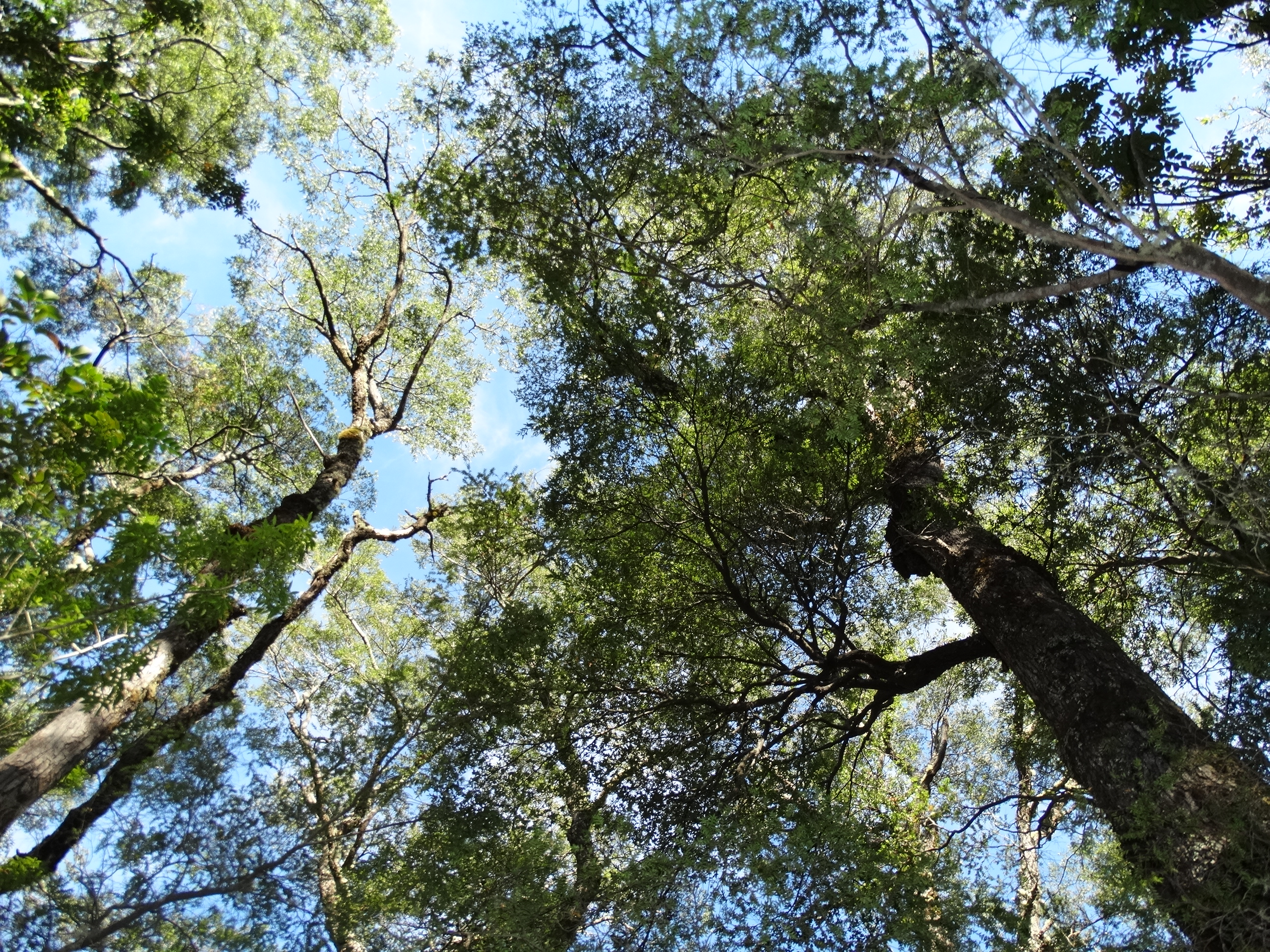
Coigüe (Nothofagus dombeyi)

The vegetation of the Park corresponds to the Valdivian temperate rain forests in its mountain variant. The composition of the forest changes with altitude and substratum. Generally the most common and visible tree is coihue, Nothofagus dombeyi, in changing association with other species that include muermo, also known as ulmo, Eucryphia cordifolia and tineo, teñiu, Weinmannia trichosperma. At relatively warm locations, that is, close to the lake, there are thickets of tique, Aextoxicon punctatum. In particularly humid locations, canelo, fuñe, Drimys winteri is common; this species is also known as Winter's bark. At altitudes above 900 meters, coihue is replaced by deciduous leaf Nothofagus species.

Trees and bushes of the Myrtaceae, the family of myrtus, are with nine species the most diversified taxon in the Park. They are generally associated with the presence of plenty water. Easily visible on beaches because of its bright orange bark is Temu, arrayan, Luma apiculata, Chilean myrtle. Luma colorada, Reloncavi, Amomyrtus luma is well known in Chile because of its dense, heavy wood that was used to manufacture police truncheons.

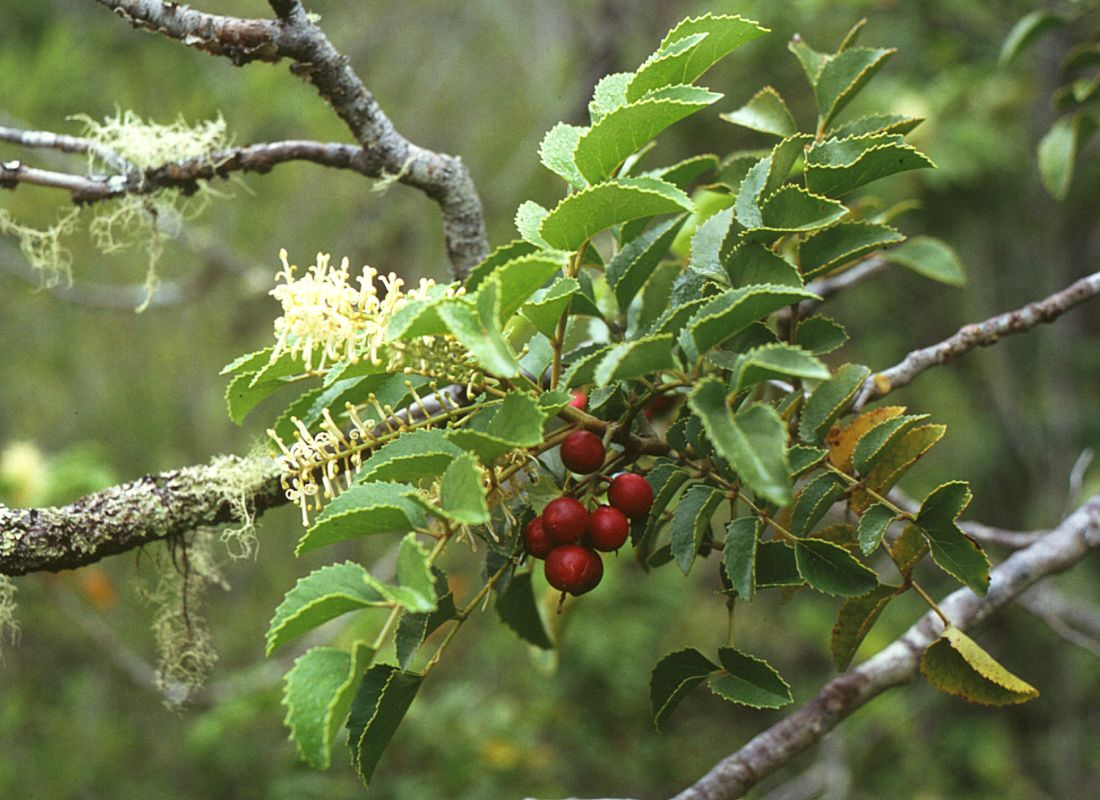
Chilean hazelnut (Gevuina avellana)

The lineage of the Proteaceae, with relatives in Australia and New Zealand, has several representatives in the Park. Notro, fosforillo, Embothrium coccineum, Chilean firebush, has plentiful red tubular flowers and is frequent almost everywhere at the fringe of the forest. Avellano, gevuin, Gevuina avellana, Chilean hazel, carries edible nuts called avellanas. This tree does not shed its nuts until the following year, so on its branches co-exist yellow-white aromatic flowers, unripe red nuts and ripe black nuts.

Among herbaceous vegetation, the giant pangue, nalca, Chilean rhubarb Gunnera tinctoria is ubiquitous. It grows up to 2 meters tall and has very large leaves. The stem is edible and the indigenous name "nalca" actually applies to this part of the plant. The root was used in the past for dyeing wool; it yields a brown color. Pangue is among the first plants to colonize land freed by landslide.

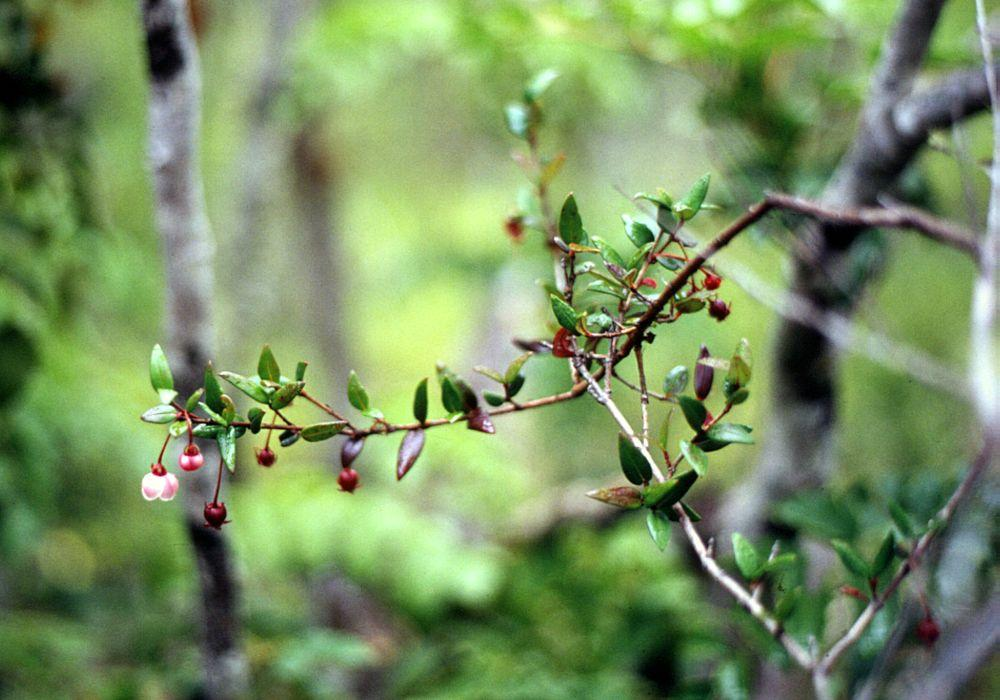
Chilean guava berry (Ugni molinae)

In this forest ecosystem, a number of plant species rely on birds, notably hummingbirds, for pollination. The flowers of these species are generally bright red and yellow and have no perfume. The flowers awaiting the visit of birds tend to be tubular and hanging.

A number of exotic plants have become feral in the Park. The most visible impact is given by retamo, Spanish Broom Spartium junceum, syn. Genista juncea, also known as Weaver's Broom, a perennial, leguminous shrub native to the Mediterranean region, toxic to animals. It thrives on the sand fields around the Osorno, along the road from Ensenada to Petrohue and in Petrohue. Retamo is very pretty when in flower but it does not belong.

== Fauna ==
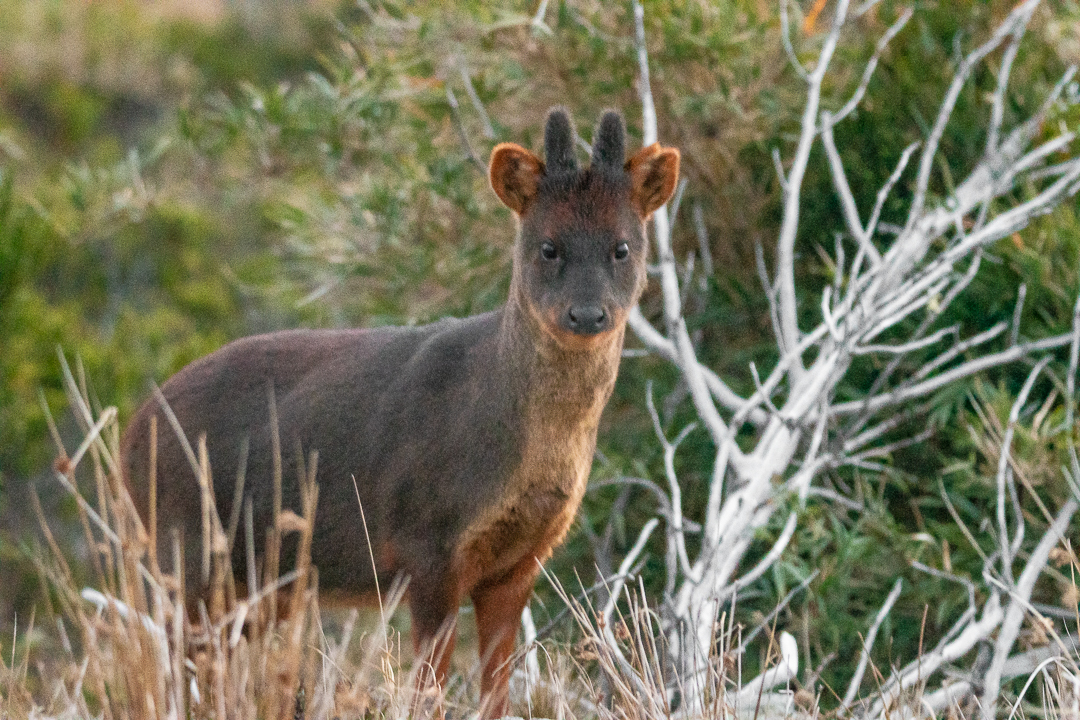
Pudú (Pudu puda)

About 30 species of mammals live in the Park. These species are shy and difficult to observe. This Park and the geographically contiguous Puyehue, Nahuel Huapi and Lanin parks provide habitat to the puma, Puma concolor. The local sub-species is relatively small, usually not more than 30 or 40 kg, and preys on pudu Pudu puda, a tiny deer of solitary and reclusive forest habitat. Huiña, kodkod, Leopardus guigna, often mistaken for a stocky, short wild cat, is actually a member of the family of the leopards, a tiny ocelot. Of the group of the Canidae, the dogs, the Park is inhabited by chilla, Pseudalopex griseus, an animal that looks like a small fox but is not actually a fox.

Introduced European red deer, Cervus elaphus, is having negative impact on natural renewal of the forest. Also damaging to the ecosystem balance is the introduced wild boar, Sus scrofa.

Three native species of carnivores in the Mustelidae and Mephitidae groups inhabit the Park. One is Molina's hog-nosed skunk, Conepatus chinga; the second is lesser grison, Galictis cuja; the third is southern river otter, Lontra provocax, an endangered species. An introduced mustelid: American mink, Neogale vison, has wrought havoc in the Parks ecosystems. The impact of mink has been devastating for bird species nesting on the ground and on floating reeds.

A diversity of animals of the rodent group live in the park. The larger ones are coipo, coypu, Myocastor coypus, a webbed-feet animal that inhabits reedy lake and river banks; and Wolffsohn's viscacha, Lagidium wolffsohni, of the family Chinchillidae, whose preferred habitat is above the timber line. Among the smaller rodents, scientists have shown particular interest for Chilean climbing mouse, Irenomys tarsalis, and for the long-clawed mole mouse, Geoxus valdivianus.

The park is home to two species of marsupial mammals. Monito del monte, Dromiciops gliroides, has a semi-arboreal habit. It has been discussed why this South American marsupial appears to more closely related to the marsupials of Australasia than to those of the Americas. The other marsupial in the Park is the long-nosed shrew opossum, Ryncholestes raphanurus, first described for science in 1923.

Around 80 species of birds, among full-time residents, seasonal migrants and visitors, are seen in the Park. Among the full-time residents are the Rhinocriptidae, of which the easiest to hear, and sometimes to see, is chucao tapaculo, Scelorchilus rubecula. Another rhinocryptid bird: black-throated huet-huet, Pteroptochos tarnii, is a speciality for birders in this park. Torrent duck, Merganetta armata, is sometimes seen at Petrohue waterfalls. One species of hummingbirds, the firecrown Sephanoides sephaniodes, is common and easily visible in the Park.

The native fish fauna in Todos los Santos lake has been upset with the introduction of several species of trout and salmon. Sports fishing of these introduced species is a major activity in the Park.

Among arthropods, the large antlered scarabeid beetle Chiasognathus granti, and the shiny coloured cerambycid beetle Cheloderus childreni have to be mentioned.

== Park services ==
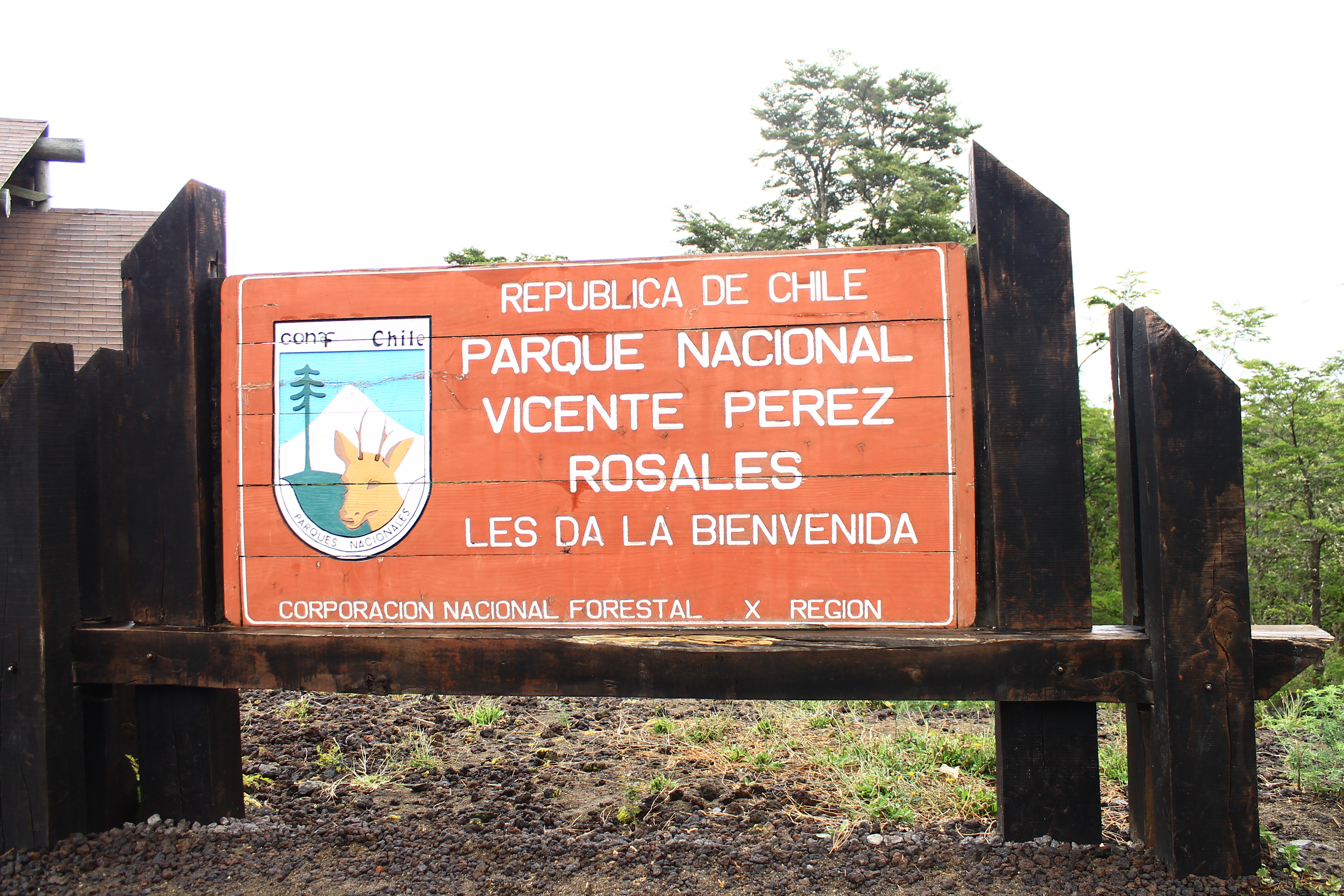

Management of this and other national parks in Chile is entrusted to Corporacion Nacional Forestal, CONAF. CONAF has outposts in Ensenada, Petrohue and Peulla and control posts at the Petrohue waterfalls and at various access points to the Osorno volcano. A camping place administered by CONAF exists in Petrohue. CONAF has habilitated a number of hiking trails, of which the more significant ones are: Sendero Paso Desolacion on the eastern slope of the Osorno, with 12 km length and reaching up to 1100 meters altitude, and Sendero Laguna Margarita in Peulla, 8 km long.

Lake Todos los Santos is a segment of a trail over the Andes known to have been used for centuries. In the late 19th century, a regular freight and tourist service between Puerto Montt was established, together with hotels and lodges. There are modern good quality hotels at the lake access points Petrohue and Peulla. Lodges catering for the needs of fisherpersons exist at the lake in Cayutue and close to Petrohue waterfalls and river. In Petrohue, private enterprise offers motor boats for rent.
