= Llancahue =

Llancahue Nature Sanctuary
- Reserva Periurbana Llancahue
- Location within Chile
- Location: Los Ríos Region, Chile
- Nearest city: Valdivia
- Coordinates: 39°49′0″S 73°07′0″W
- Area: 12.77 km^{2} (4.93 sq mi)
- Designation: Nature sanctuary
- Designated: 2022
- Governing body: Austral University of Chile

Lancahue is a protected area and watershed in the commune of Valdivia, Chile. It has an area of 12.7 km^{2}, of which 7 km^{2} are old-growth forest. The protected area host a relatively unscathed remnant of lowland (<300 m asl.) Valdivian temperate forest. Part of the protected area contain secondary forest that started to develop after a fire around 1914, while other secondary forests originated from intense wood logging.

The main tree species in Llancahue are Nothofagus dombeyi, Eucryphia cordifolia, Laureliopsis philippiana and Aextoxicon punctatum.

The drainage basin of Llancahue is used for water supply in the nearby city of Valdivia.
