= Osorno (volcano) =

Active volcano in Chile

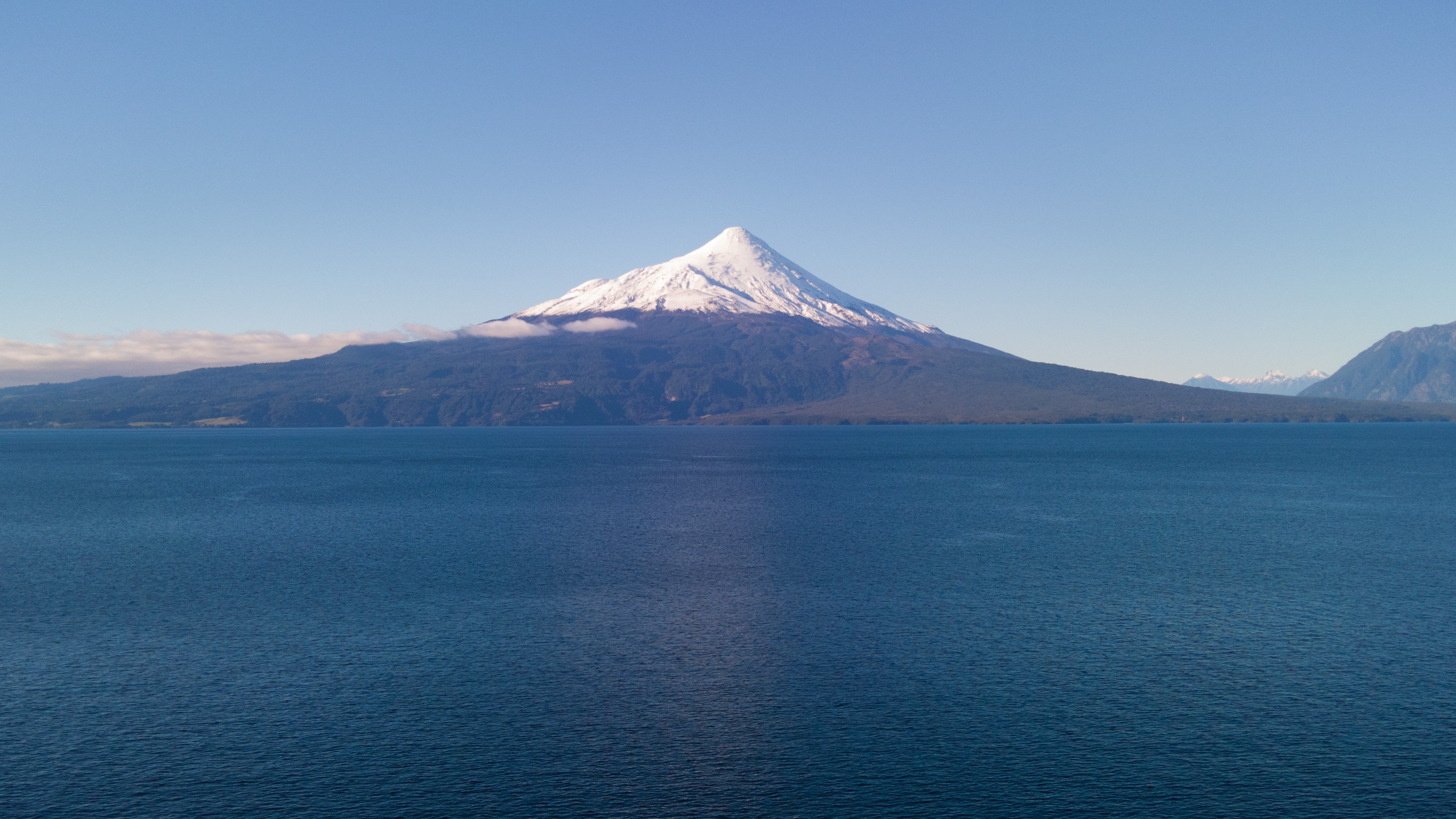
- Osorno Volcano and Llanquihue Lake

Highest point
- Elevation: 2,652 m (8,701 ft)
- Coordinates: 41°06′17″S 72°29′46″W

Geography
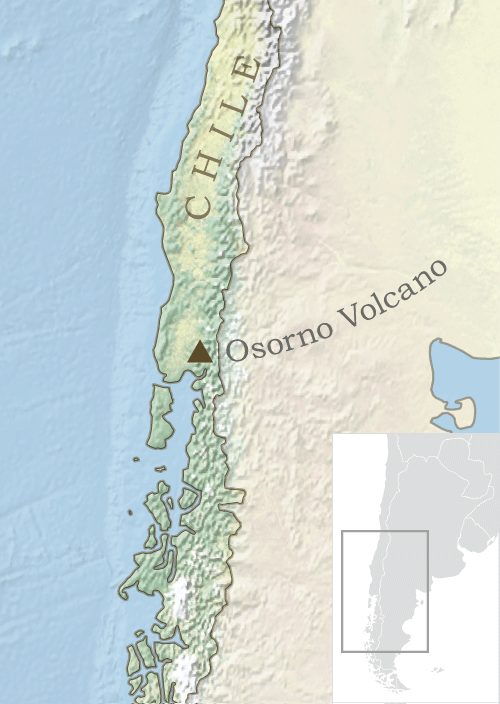
- Location: Chile
- Parent range: Andes

Geology
- Mountain type: Stratovolcano
- Volcanic zone: South Volcanic Zone
- Last eruption: 1869

Climbing
- First ascent: 1848 by Jean Renous
- Easiest route: rock/snow/ice climb

Osorno Volcano is a 2,652-metre-tall (8,701 ft) conical stratovolcano lying between Osorno Province and Llanquihue Province in the Los Lagos Region of southern Chile. It stands on the southeastern shore of Llanquihue Lake, and also towers over Todos los Santos Lake. Osorno is considered a symbol of the local landscape and, as such, tends to be the referential element of the area in regards to tourism. By some definitions, it marks the northern boundary of Chilean Patagonia.

== Etymology ==
The volcano's current name comes from the nearby city of Osorno, from which it was visible to Spanish settlers. Native populations gave it different names, such as Purailla, Purarhue, Prarauque, Peripillan, Choshueco, Hueñauca, and Guanauca. The latter two were the most commonly used names in the mid-18th century.

== Overview ==
The volcano has a height of 2,652 meters (8,701 feet) and an imposing conical shape which looms over Llanquihue lake. It is situated across the lake from the cities of Puerto Varas, Frutillar, Llanquihue and Puerto Octay. It dominates the region's landscape, and its height means that it can be seen from the entire province of Osorno, even in some places on the island of Chiloé. Volcán Osorno is located almost 45 kilometers (28 miles) northeast of Puerto Varas. Though in geological terms it is still considered an active volcano, there has been no volcanic activity in over one hundred years, it having last erupted in 1869. In recent years the volcano has become a popular tourist attraction. Skiing and hiking have become common recreational activities on the mountain.

The volcano is accessible from the towns of Puerto Klocker, Ensenada, and Petrohué, and at its base is the town of Las Cascadas.

=== Volcanic activity ===
Volcán Osorno is one of the most active volcanoes of the southern Chilean Andes, with eleven eruptions recorded between 1575 and 1869. It sits on top of a 250,000-year-old eroded stratovolcano, La Picada, with a 6-km-wide caldera.

On January 19, 1835, during the second voyage of the Beagle, Charles Darwin was near Ancud and witnessed an eruption of the volcano, which he recorded in his journal and which made him suspect the existence of a relationship between the simultaneous activity of geographically distant volcanoes. However, the data on which this idea was based were, at least in part, wrong, since they reported an eruption of Aconcagua, which is very unlikely given that even in Darwin's time, Aconcagua was already a long-extinct paleovolcano.

=== Appearance ===
The basalt and andesite lava flows generated during these eruptions reached both Lago Llanquihue and Lago Todos Los Santos. All of the upper slopes of Osorno were, until recently, almost entirely covered in glacial ice. However, large areas of glacial retreat have now occurred on the N and W slopes of the volcano. The glaciers were extensive despite its very modest altitude and latitude, sustained by the substantial annual snowfall in the very moist maritime climate of the region. Osorno has also historically produced pyroclastic flow, since it is a composite volcano. The volcano has been noted for its similar appearance to Mount Fuji in Japan.

== Image gallery ==
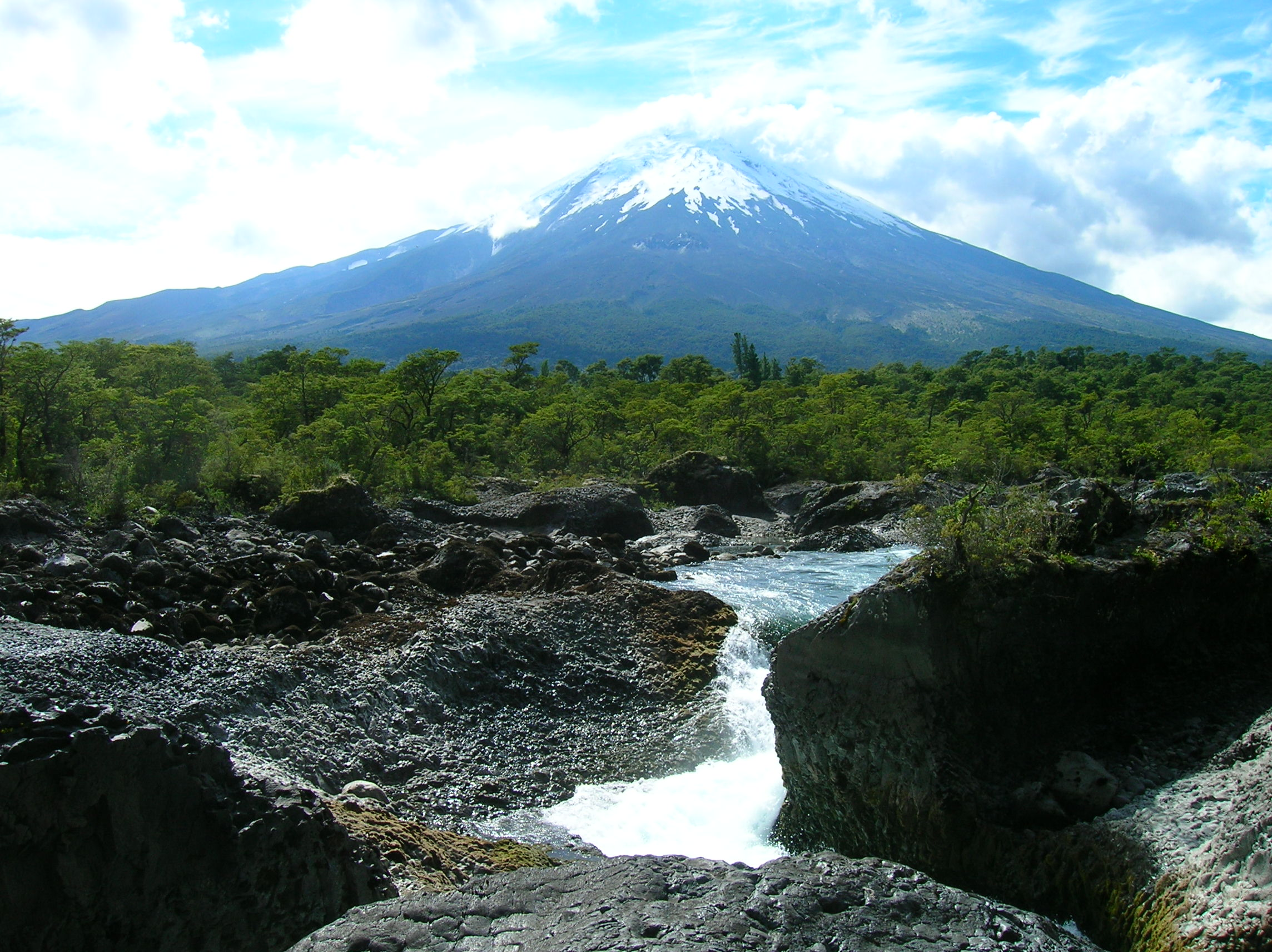
Petrohué Waterfalls (Saltos del Petrohué) with Osorno volcano in the background.

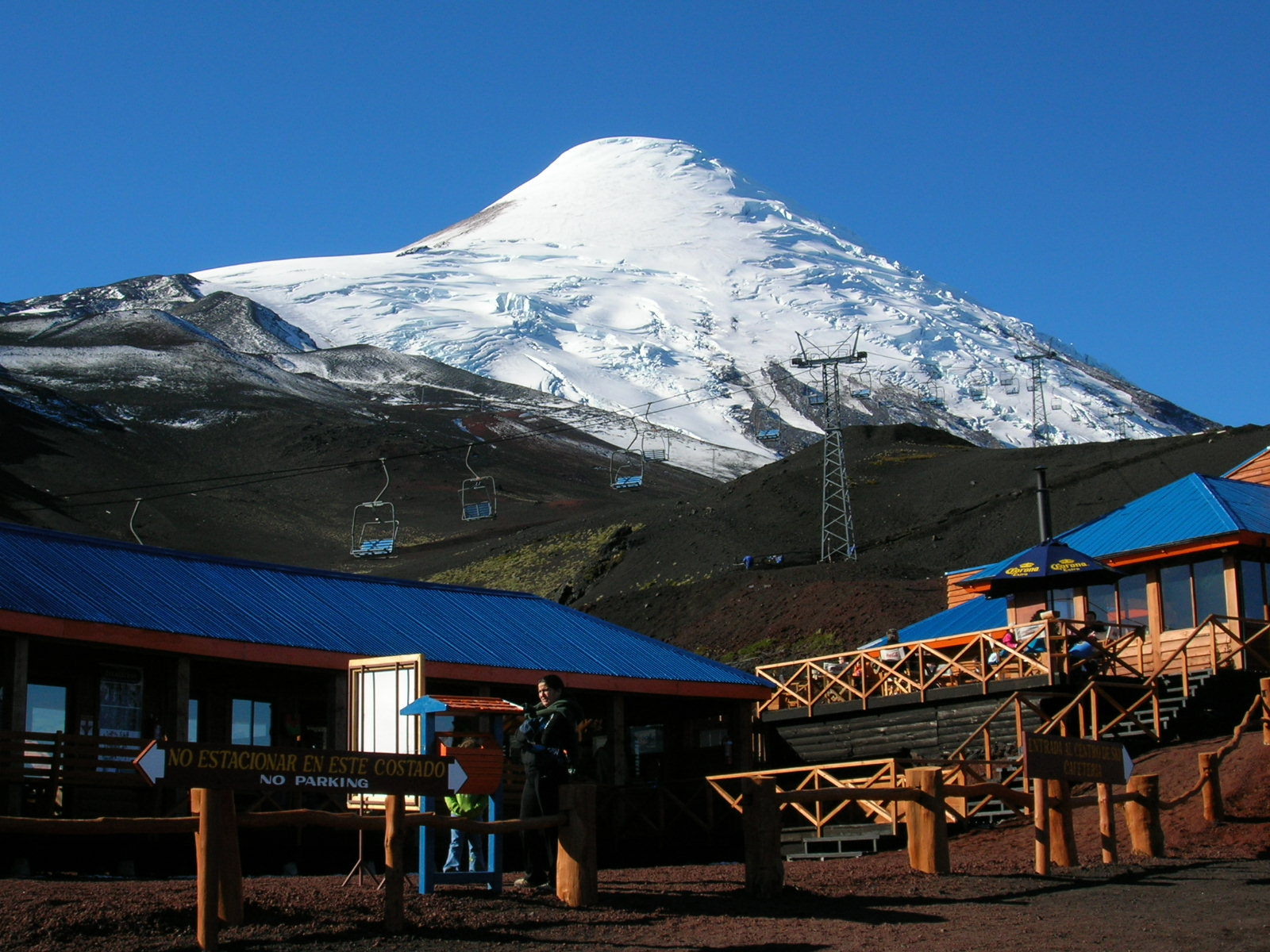
Ski La Burbuja, Osorno Volcano.

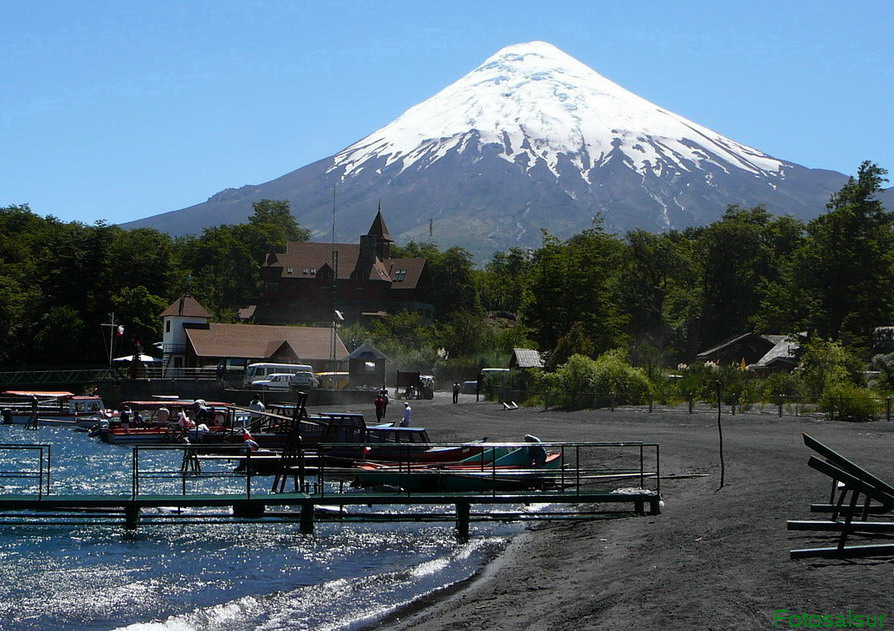
Osorno Volcano from Petrohué Harbor.

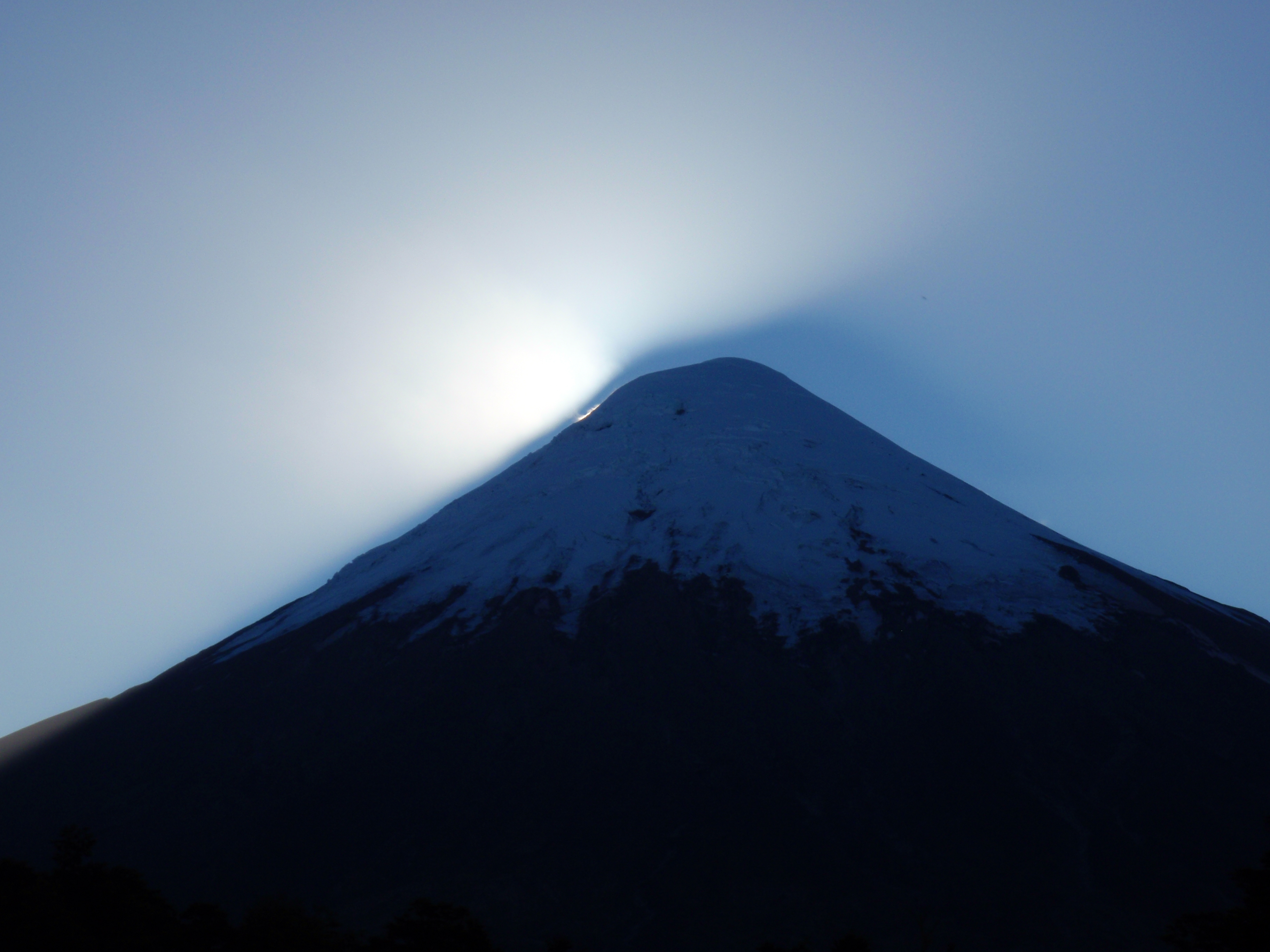
Sun setting behind the peak, highlighting the drifting snow.

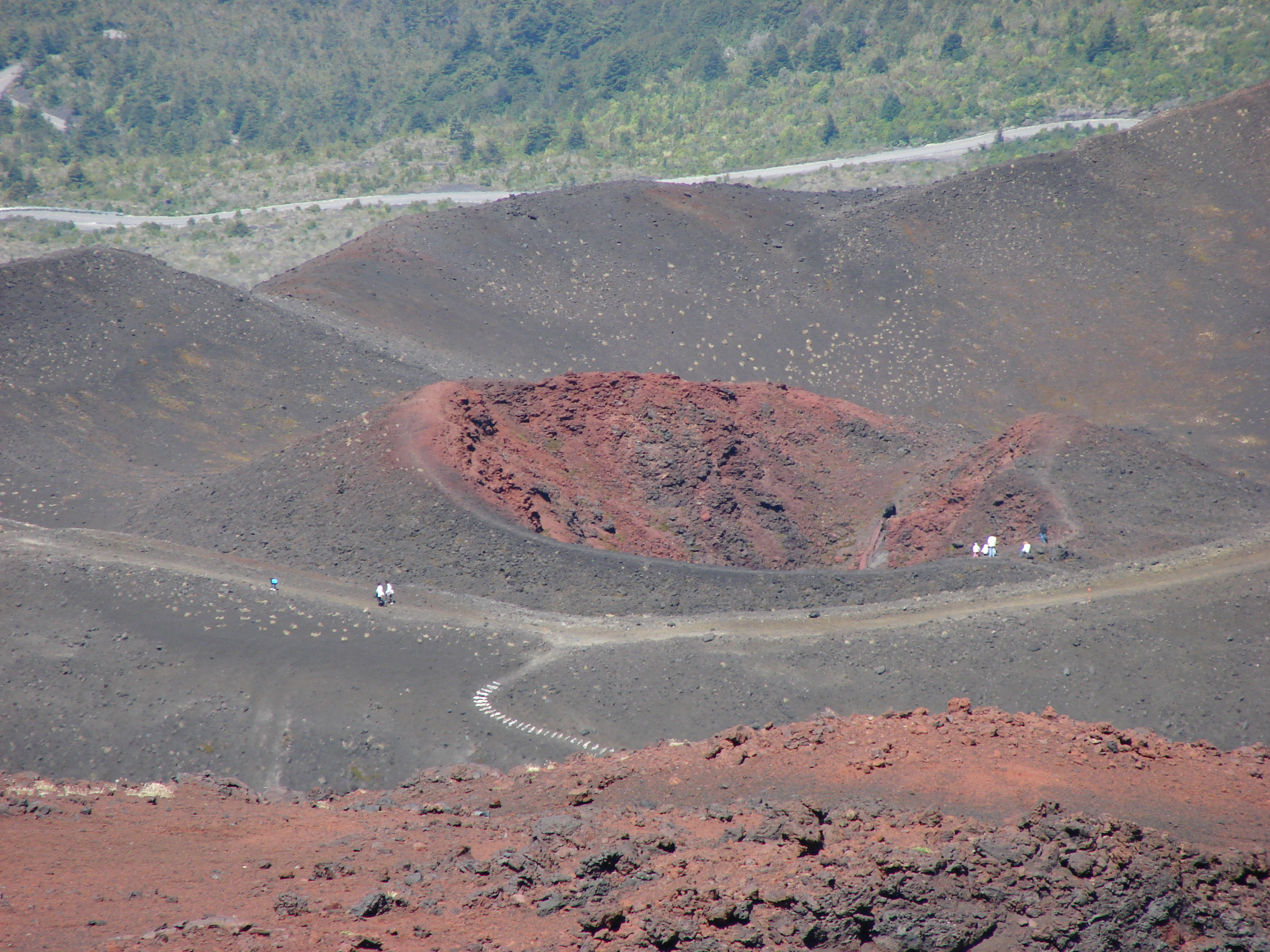
The "Red Crater" on the slopes of Osorno (a "flank crater").

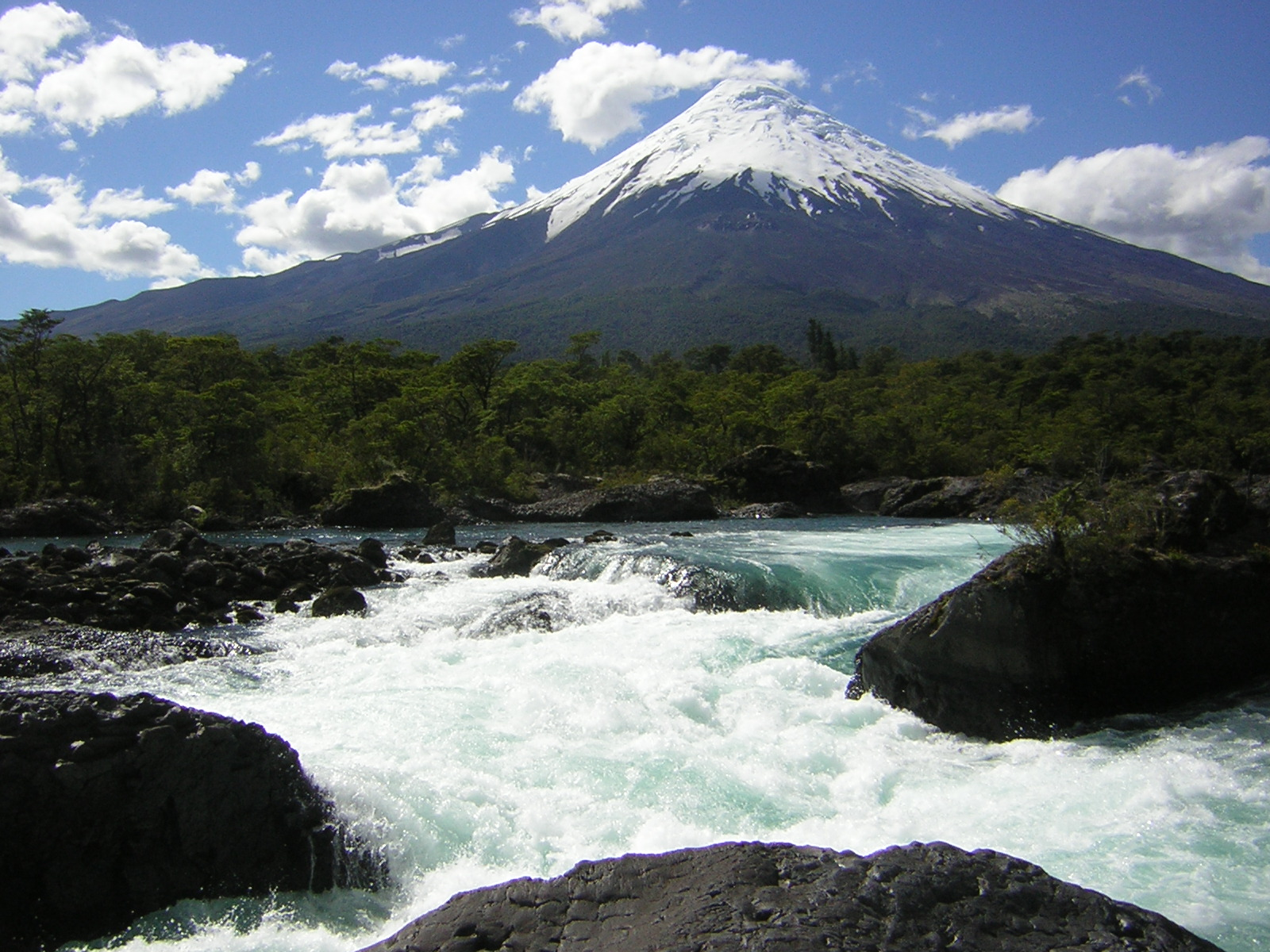
Osorno in front of the Petrohué Waterfalls.

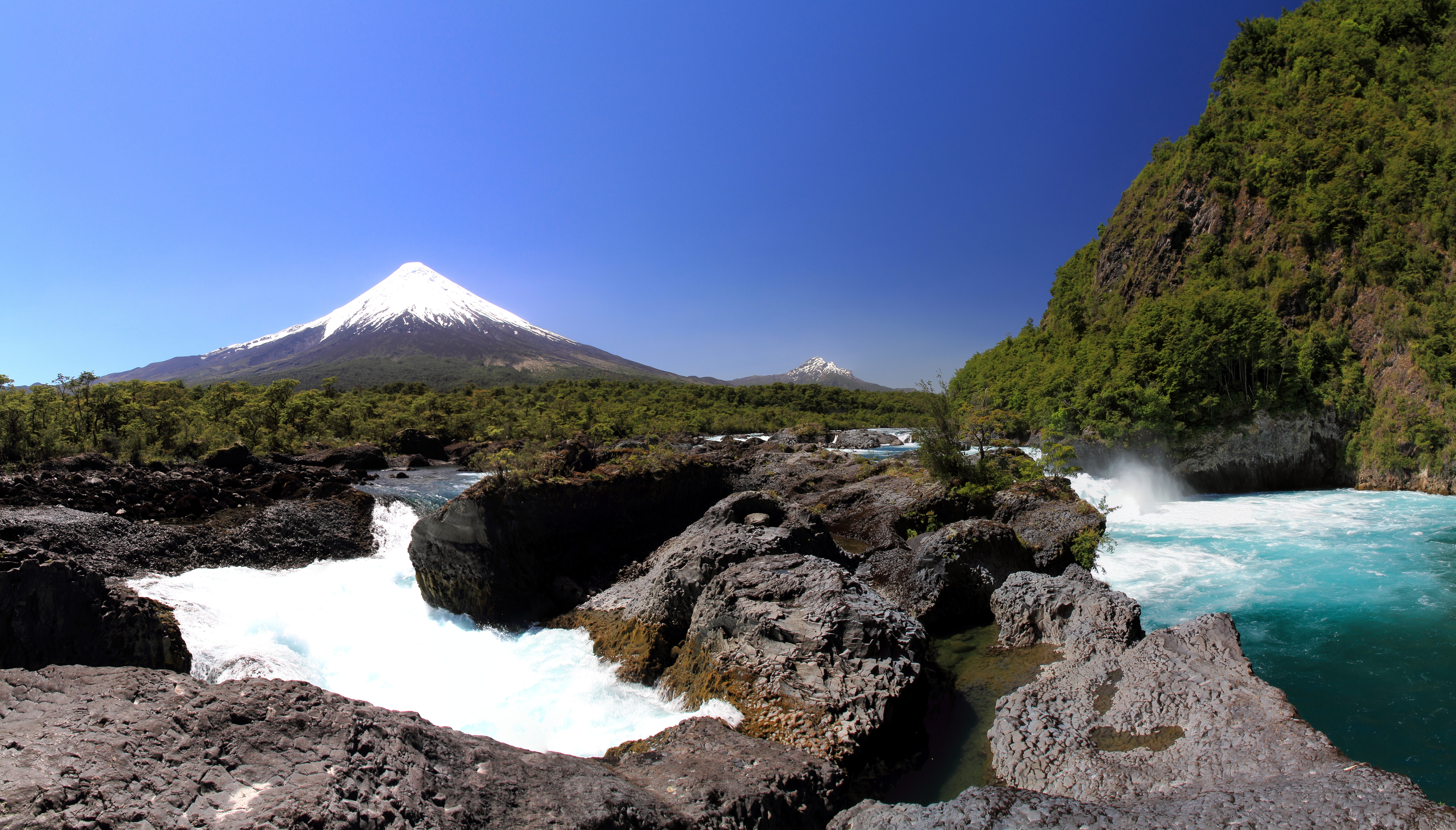
Osorno Volcano and Petrohué Waterfalls.

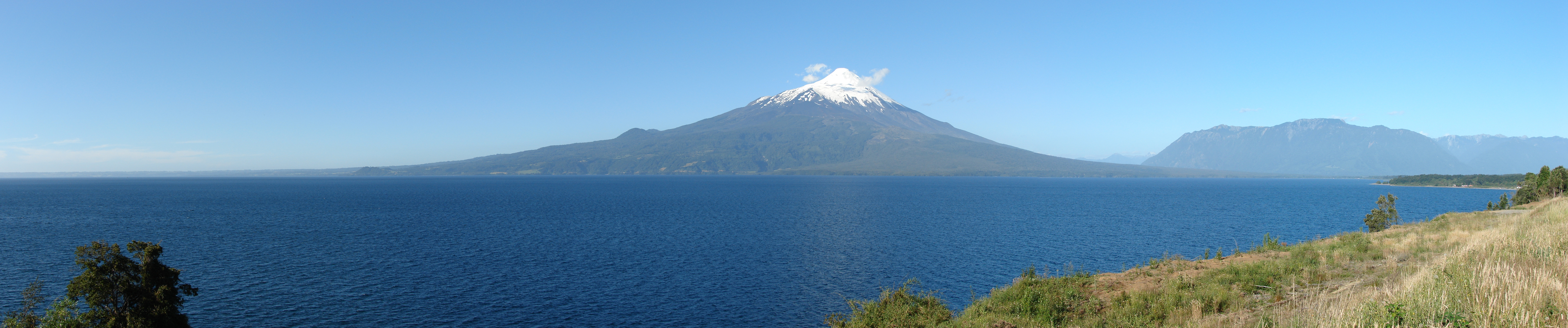
A panoramic view of Osorno Volcano from Llanquihue Lake on 11 Feb 2010. The image is created from six separate photos stitched together.

== See also ==
- List of volcanoes in Chile
