= Valdivian temperate forests =

Temperate forest ecoregion in Chile and Argentina

Valdivian temperate forests (NT0404)
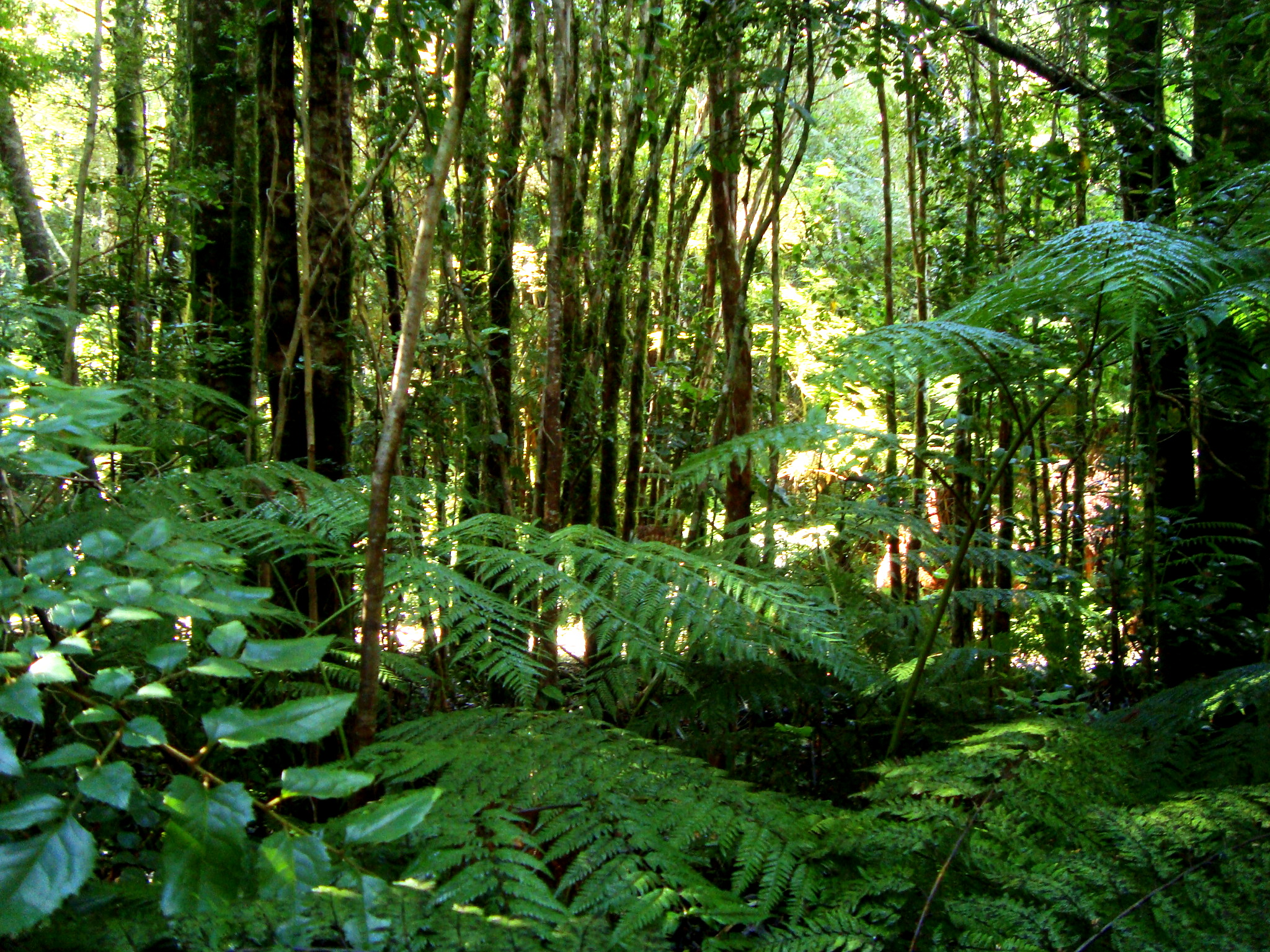
- Trees and understory at Oncol Park

- Location in the south of South America

Ecology
- Realm: Neotropical
- Biome: Temperate broadleaf and mixed forests
- Borders: Chilean matorral; Magellanic subpolar forests; Patagonian steppe; Southern Andean steppe

Geography
- Area: 248,100 km^{2} (95,800 mi^{2})
- Countries: Chile; Argentina

Conservation
- Protected: 24.16%

The Valdivian temperate forests (NT0404) is an ecoregion on the west coast of southern South America, in Chile and Argentina. It is part of the Neotropical realm. The forests are named after the city of Valdivia. The Valdivian temperate rainforests are characterized by their dense understories of bamboos, ferns, and for being mostly dominated by evergreen angiosperm trees with some deciduous specimens, though conifer trees are also common.

== The Valdivian forest ==
Temperate rainforests comprise a relatively narrow Chilean coastal strip, between the Pacific Ocean to the west and the southern Andes Mountains to the east, from roughly 37° to 48° south latitude. North of 42°, the Chilean Coast Range stretches on, with just the north–south running Chilean Central Valley between it and the Andes. South of 42°, the coast range continues as a chain of offshore islands (including Chiloé Island and the Chonos Archipelago), while the "Central Valley" is submerged and continues as the Gulf of Corcovado. Much of the ecoregion was once covered by the Patagonian Ice Sheet and other glaciers during the peak of the last ice age, with ice descending from the Andes Mountains; numerous bodies of water within the Chilean Lake District (in the central part of the ecoregion) are the remnants of ancient glacial valleys. The southern part of the region features many glacier-carved fjords.

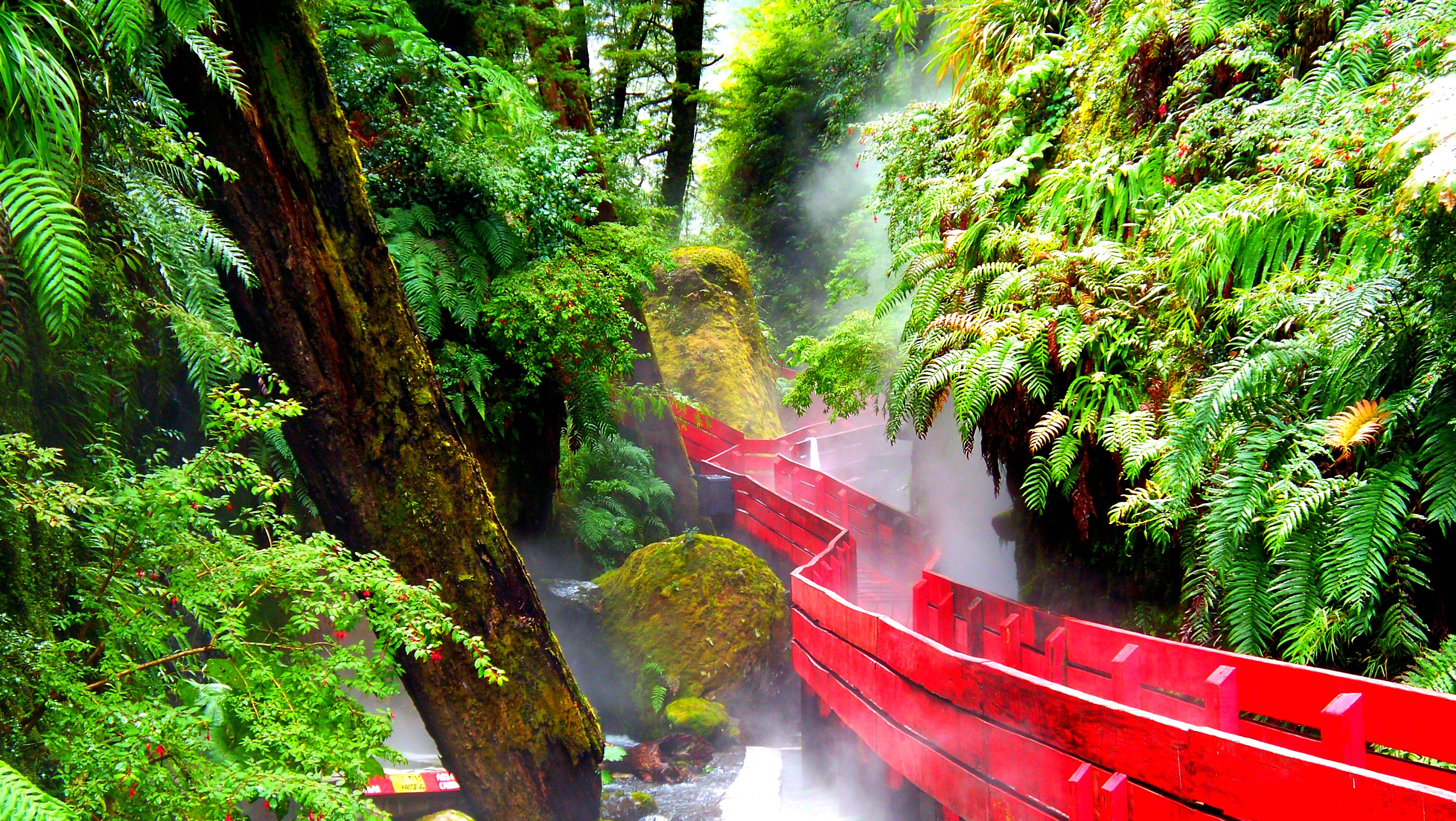
Vegetation around Termas Geométricas near Coñaripe. The Andes of Zona Sur host numerous hotsprings.

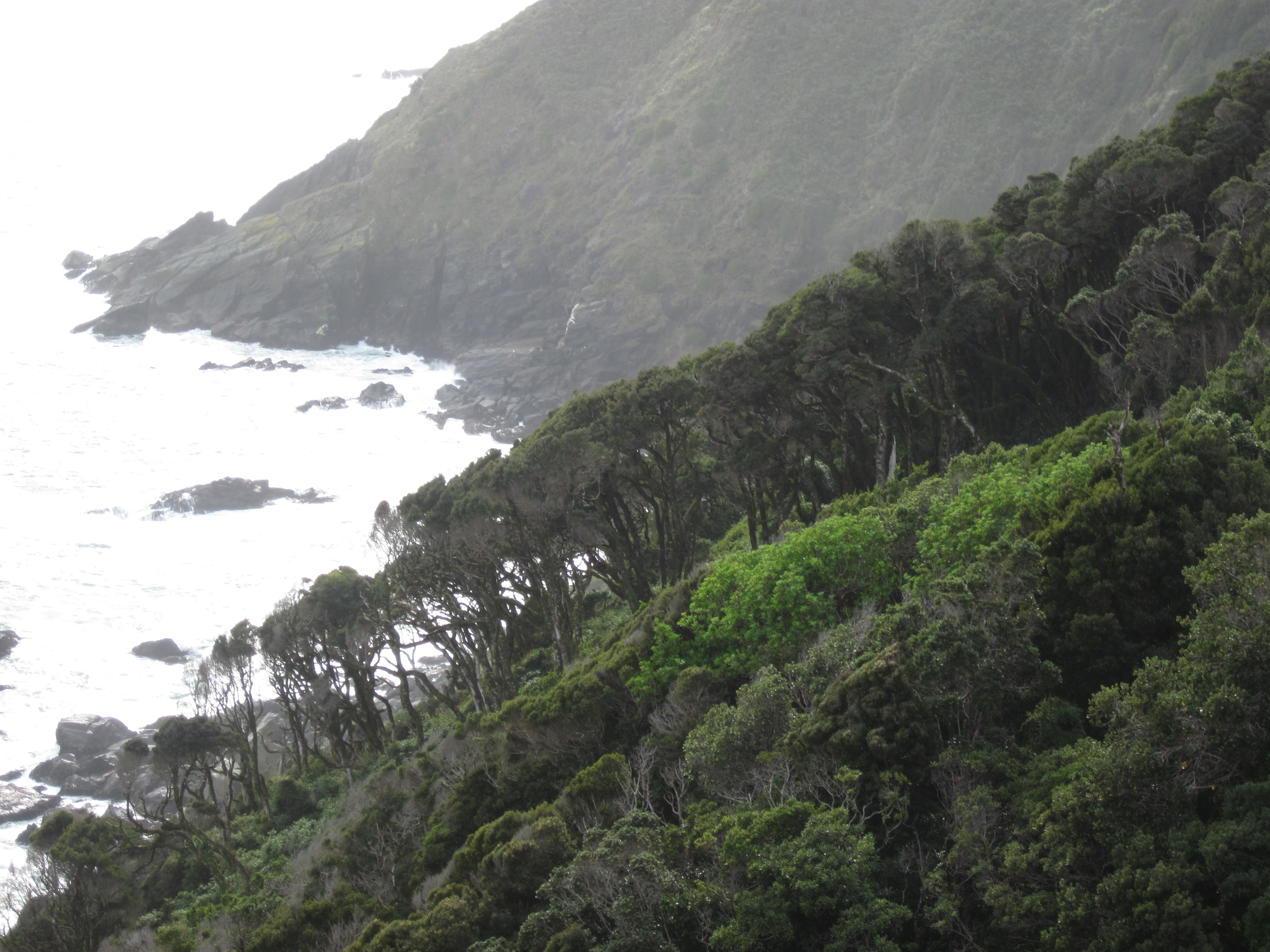
An old-grown pure stand of Aextoxicon in Punta Curiñanco at the Pacific coast.

To the north, the Valdivian forests give way to the Mediterranean forests, woodlands, and scrub of the Chilean Matorral ecoregion. A few coastal enclaves of Valdivian forest grow in north-central Chile (such as Bosque de Fray Jorge National Park) as remains of the Last Glacial Maximum. To the south lies the Magellanic subpolar forests ecoregion. The temperate Valdivian, matorral, and Magellanic ecoregions are isolated from the subtropical/tropical forests that dominate northern South America by such landscapes as the Atacama desert (north of the matorral), the Andes Mountains, and the dry, rain-shadow Patagonian steppe east of the Andes. As a result, the temperate forest regions have evolved in relative isolation, with a high degree of endemic species.

Due to a similar location geographically and geologically (along the Pacific Plate), the coast-hugging temperate rainforests of the Pacific Northwest (from Northern California to Southern Alaska, roughly 40°-60° north latitude) exist in similar settings, with the Rocky Mountains to the east and the Pacific Ocean to the west. East of the Rocky Mountains, the North American prairie grassland stretches from south-central Canada to Texas, not unlike the Argentine grasslands to the east of the Andes. Similar to the Atacama region of Chile, the Baja California and Sonoran deserts in the US/Mexican states of Arizona and Baja California act as climatic borders for the northwest’s rainforests.

=== Climate ===
Since the forest is located at around 40 degrees south, it is strongly influenced by the westerlies. The water vapor held by the westerlies condenses as they encounter the windward slope of the Chilean Coast Range and the Andes, create orographic rainfall. Average annual precipitation varies from 1,000 mm at the northern edge of the ecoregion to more than 6,000 mm per year in the south. The northern portion of the ecoregion has a Submediterranean climate, with rainfall concentrated in the winter months. This seasonality decreases towards the south.

Average annual temperatures are fairly uniform within the area, especially at coastal locations where annual temperature differences between localities never exceed 7 °C. The northward-flowing oceanic Humboldt Current creates humid and foggy conditions near the coast. In the summer the temperature can climb to 16.5 °C (62 °F), while during winter the temperature can drop below 7 °C (45 °F). Winter temperatures are lower at higher elevations. The tree line is at about 2,400 m in the northern part of the ecoregion (35° S), and descends to 1,000 m in the south of the Valdivian region.

== Flora ==
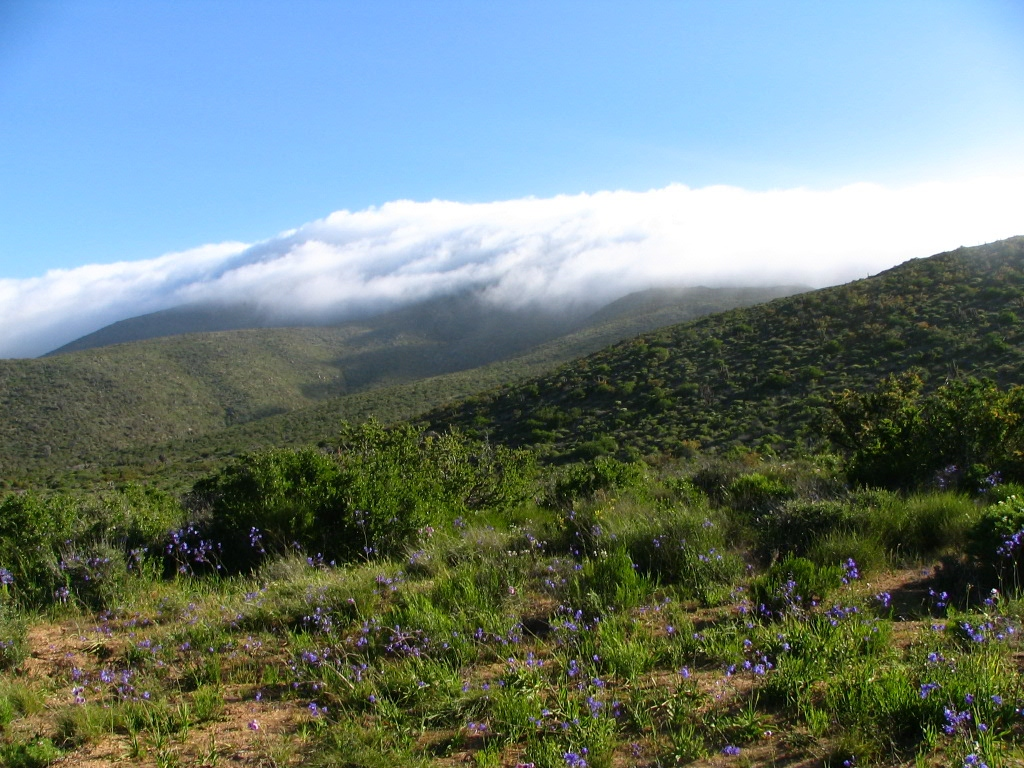
Valdivian cloud forest Bosque de Fray Jorge in semi-arid Norte Chico.

The Valdivian temperate rainforests are temperate broadleaf and mixed forests. The Valdivian and Magellanic temperate rainforests are the only temperate rainforests in South America and one of a small number of temperate rainforests in the world. Together they are the second largest in the world, after the Pacific temperate rainforests of North America (which stretches from Alaska to northern California). The Valdivian forests are a refuge for the Antarctic flora, and share many plant families with the temperate rainforests of New Zealand, Tasmania, and Australia. Fully half the species of woody plants are endemic to this ecoregion.

Chusquea quila is a bamboo that grows in humid areas below 500 m, where Chusquea culeou becomes more dominant above. Chusquea quila can form pure stands called quilantales. Very few plants can grow under this species. Other notable species are the nalca or Chilean rhubarb (Gunnera tinctoria) and the ferns Lophosoria quadripinnata and Parablechnum cordatum. Chile's national flower, the copihue (Lapageria rosea) is a pioneer species that grows in disturbed areas of the Valdivian rainforest.

The maximum plant species richness is found at latitudes 40 to 43° S.

=== Forest ecosystems ===
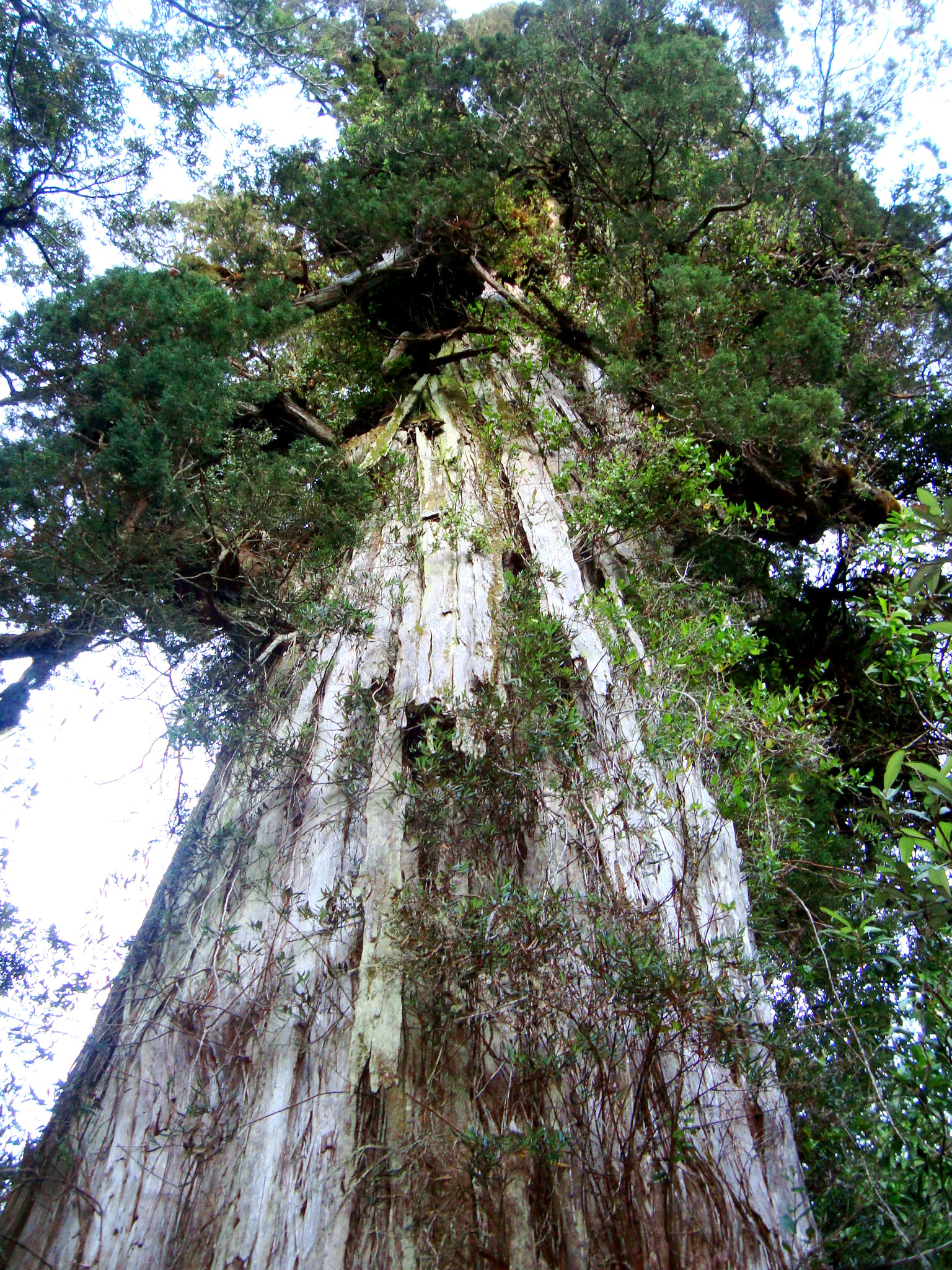
Alerce

There are four main types of forest ecosystems in the Valdivian ecoregion.

Deciduous forests. At the northern end of the ecoregion are deciduous forests, dominated by deciduous species of southern beech, including rauli (Nothofagus alpina) and roble (N. obliqua). This is a transitional zone to the Mediterranean-climate region to the north. It grows from 35 to 36º S latitude along Chilean Coast Range, where it is known as Maulino forest. Nothofagus glauca and Nothofagus alessandrii are predominant trees in Maulino forest. Deciduous Nothofagus forests also grow along the Andes of central Chile as far north as 33º S latitude, from approximately 1,200 meters elevation up to the tree line at 2,400 meters elevation. A krummholz of Nothofagus antarctica and N. pumilio grows near the tree line. The southern limit of these forests is 38º S latitude. Tall coniferous pehuén monkey-puzzle trees (Araucaria araucana) grow at the southern edge of the deciduous forests, from the coast at Nahuelbuta National Park to the Andes.

Valdivian laurel-leaved forests. Valdivian laurel-leaved forests, characterized by a variety of broadleaf evergreen trees, including Laureliopsis philippiana, Aextoxicon punctatum, Eucryphia cordifolia, Caldcluvia paniculata, and Weinmannia trichosperma, with an understory of Myrceugenia planipes, the arrayán (Luma apiculata) and other plants. Old-growth Valdivian evergreen forest (siempreverde) tend to form stratified canopy made up of two or three layers.

Patagonian Andean forests. The third forest type is the Patagonian Andean forests, which are distributed at higher elevations along the Andes mountain front, and are dominated by evergreen conifers, including pehuén (Araucaria araucana) and alerce (Fitzroya cupressoides). The alerce looks like a giant sequoia, and is a rival in longevity to the bristlecone pine, some with growth rings recording 3,625 years of local weather cycles. Closer to the treeline, the conifers give way to Andean scrublands of deciduous Nothofagus antarctica.

Northern Patagonian forests. The fourth and last type is the Northern Patagonian forests, which dominate the southern half of the ecoregion, with evergreen species such as the broadleaf Nothofagus dombeyi, Nothofagus betuloides and Drimys winteri and the coniferous podocarps, including Podocarpus nubigenus.

Distribution of plants follow Rapoport's rule with plant species distribution increasing at higher latitudes and decreasing at those closer to the equator, incidents of endemism becoming more frequent as one moves equatorward.

Lowland soils near the coast contain more available nutrients than more inland soils.

=== Origin and evolution ===
The flora of the forests has inherited and developed its characteristics due to a variety of causes. Its Neotropical affinities reflect its current geographic connection to the remaining South America. Its "Gondwanan" species are a legacy of the ancient supercontinent of Gondwana, a landmass formerly composed of South America, Africa, India, Antarctica and Australia. The high degree of endemic species and monospecific genera is thought to be linked to the geographic isolation came into being as result of the uplift of the Andes. There are a few "boreal" components in the Valdivian temperate rainforest which arrived by long-distance transport. Yet another component are the species from nearby South American ecosystems that adapted to the temperate rainforest.

During the Llanquihue glaciation much of the area west of Llanquihue Lake remained ice-free during the Last Glacial Maximum and had sparsely distributed vegetation dominated by Nothofagus species. Valdivian temperate rainforest proper was reduced to scattered remnants in to the west of the Andes. More specifically the refugia of the Valdivian temperate rainforest between latitudes 41 and 37° S were; the coastal region, the lower slopes of the Chilean Coast Range and the westernmost Chilean Central Valley all of which remained free of disturbance by the glacial, glacifluvial and periglacial disturbance through the glaciation.

== Fauna ==
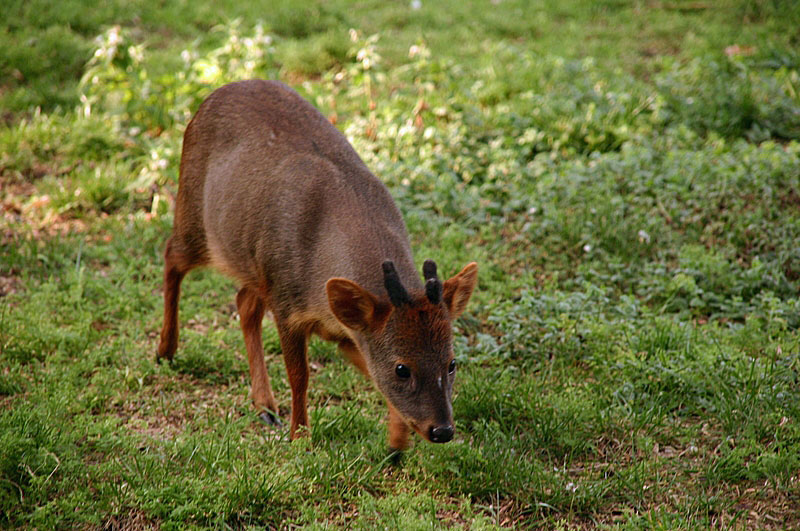
Pudú

Some of the threatened mammals of the Valdivian forests include the monito del monte (Dromiciops gliroides), an arboreal marsupial, the southern pudú (Pudu puda) the world's smallest deer, and the kodkod (Leopardus guigna), South America's smallest cat. Since the beginning of the 20th century, there have also been nonnative wild boars living in the Valdivian forests. The Chilean climbing mouse (Irenomys tarsalis) and Chilean shrew opossum (Rhyncholestes raphanurus) are endemic to the ecoregion.

Most mammal genera in Valdivian forests are also found in semi-arid parts of Patagonia. Relative to similar forest in North America there is a low diversity of mammals in Chilean temperate forests.

The slender-billed parakeet (Enicognathus leptorhynchus) is endemic. Near-endemic and limited-range birds include the Chilean pigeon (Patagioenas araucana), Black-throated huet-huet (Pteroptochos tarnii), Chucao tapaculo (Scelorchilus rubecula), and Ochre-flanked tapaculo (Eugralla paradoxa). Hummingbirds are common in the Valdivian forests because of the presence of plants like the maqui (Aristotelia chilensis) and the copihue.

== Conservation ==
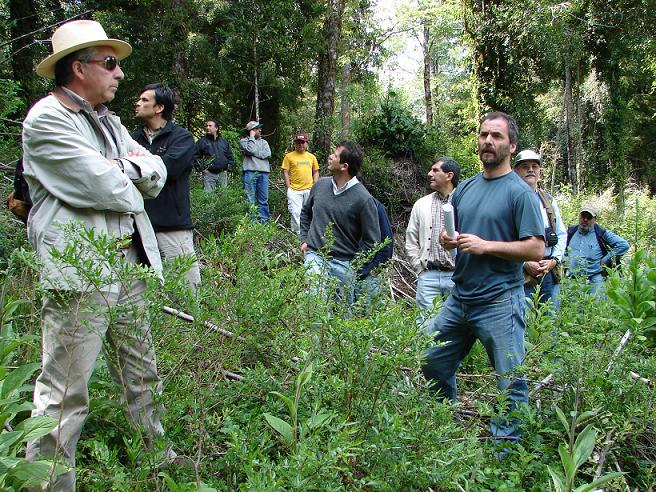
Teachers and students of UACh in the Valdivian forests of San Pablo de Tregua, Chile

The Valdivian forests include stands of huge trees, especially Nothofagus and Fitzroya, which can live to a great age. These magnificent rainforests are endangered by extensive logging and their replacement by fast-growing pines and eucalyptus, which are more sought after by the pulp and paper industry. The native trees that are cleared to make way for these monocultures are often exported as woodchips to Japan. A start at conservation was made in November 2003 when a consortium of conservation groups, both local and international, bought at auction of a bankrupt logging firm 147,500 acres (600 km^{2}) of biologically rich rainforest in the Valdivian Coastal Range. Gianni Lopez, Executive Director of CONAMA, Chile's national environmental agency remarked, "Ten years ago the existence of protected areas not owned by the government was unthinkable." Among the efforts supporting conservation, has been a growing ecotourism industry.

== Protected areas ==
24.16% of the Valdivian temperate forests ecoregion is in protected areas.

=== List of protected areas ===
==== Argentina ====
- Los Alerces National Park
- Los Arrayanes National Park
- Lago Puelo National Park
- Lanín National Park
- Nahuel Huapí National Park

==== Chile ====
Public:

- Alerce Andino National Park
- Alerce Costero National Park
- Altos de Lircay National Reserve
- Altos de Pemehue National Reserve
- Bosque de Fray Jorge National Park
- Carlos Anwandter Sanctuary
- Chiloé National Park
- China Muerta National Reserve
- Conguillío National Park
- Corcovado National Park
- Coyhaique National Reserve
- Futaleufú National Reserve
- Hornopirén National Park
- Huerquehue National Park
- Isla Guamblin National Park
- La Campana National Park
- Lago Rosselot National Reserve
- Laguna del Laja National Park
- Laguna San Rafael National Park
- Lahuen Ñadi Natural Monument
- Llanquihue National Reserve
- Los Bellotos del Melado National Reserve
- Los Huemules de Niblinto National Reserve
- Los Queules National Reserve
- Los Ruiles National Reserve
- Melimoyu National Park
- Mocho-Choshuenco National Reserve
- Nahuelbuta National Park
- Nonguén National Park
- Península de Hualpén Nature Sanctuary
- Pumalín Douglas Tompkins National Park
- Puyehue National Park
- Queulat National Park
- Radal Siete Tazas National Park
- Ralco National Reserve
- Río Los Cipreses National Reserve
- Tolhuaca National Park
- Vicente Perez Rosales National Park
- Villarrica National Park

Private:

- Huilo-Huilo Biological Reserve (owned by Víctor Peterman)
- Llancahue (administered by the Austral University of Chile)
- Los Vertientes Private Nature Reserve
- Meullín-Puye Nature Sanctuary (administered by the Kreen Foundation)
- Oncol Park (owned by Celulosa Arauco y Constitución)
- Área Costera Protegida Punta Curiñanco (owned by CODEFF)
- Tantauco Park (owned by Sebastián Piñera)
- Valdivian Coastal Reserve (owned by The Nature Conservancy)

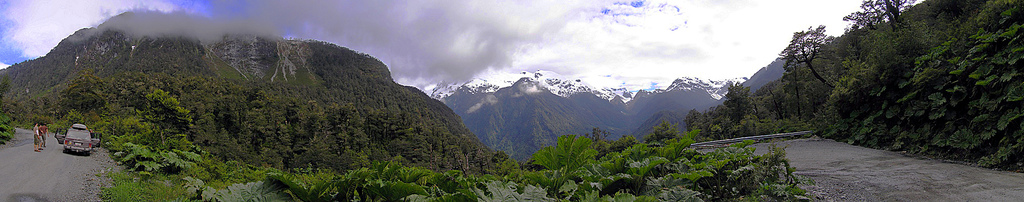
Nalcas at Cuesta Queulat in Queulat National Park

== See also ==
- Chilean Native Forest Law
- Chilean matorral
- Magellanic subpolar forests
- Maulino forest
