= Punta Curiñanco =

Área Costera Protegida Punta Curiñanco
- Location within Chile
- Location: Los Ríos Region, Chile
- Nearest city: Valdivia
- Coordinates: 39°42′59″S 73°24′31″W
- Area: 80 ha (198 acres)

Área Costera Protegida Punta Curiñanco is a natural reserve 40 km (25 mi) from the city of Valdivia, Chile. The park has an area of 80 ha (198 acres) on the headland of Punta Curiñanco (Curiñanco Point) at just at the northern end of Curiñanco beach and village and on the western side of the Valdivian Coast Range. Punta Curiñanco covers area that includes different types of Valdivian temperate rain forest as well as coastal shrublands, wetlands and sea-side rocks.

== Flora and fauna ==
Punta Curiñanco is vegetated by a coastal association of Valdivian forest. Among the tree species that can be found are Aextoxicon punctatum (Olivillo), Luma apiculata (Arrayán), Eucryphia cordifolia (Ulmo), Persea lingue (Lingue), Drimys winteri (Canelo), Embothrium coccineum (Notro), Amomyrtus meli (Meli) and Lomatia ferruginea (Romerillo). The olivillos of Punta Curiñanco form pure forests.

As for mammals, pumas, pudús, chungungos, chilla foxes, guiñas, and sea lions are known to be present in the protected area. Some of the birds that have been observed in the reserve are the Cinclodes nigrofumosus (Coastal Churrete), the Elaenia albiceps (Fío-Fío), the Phalacrocorax gaimardi (Cormorant Lile) and the Buteo polyosoma (Aguilucho).
