= Protected areas of Chile =

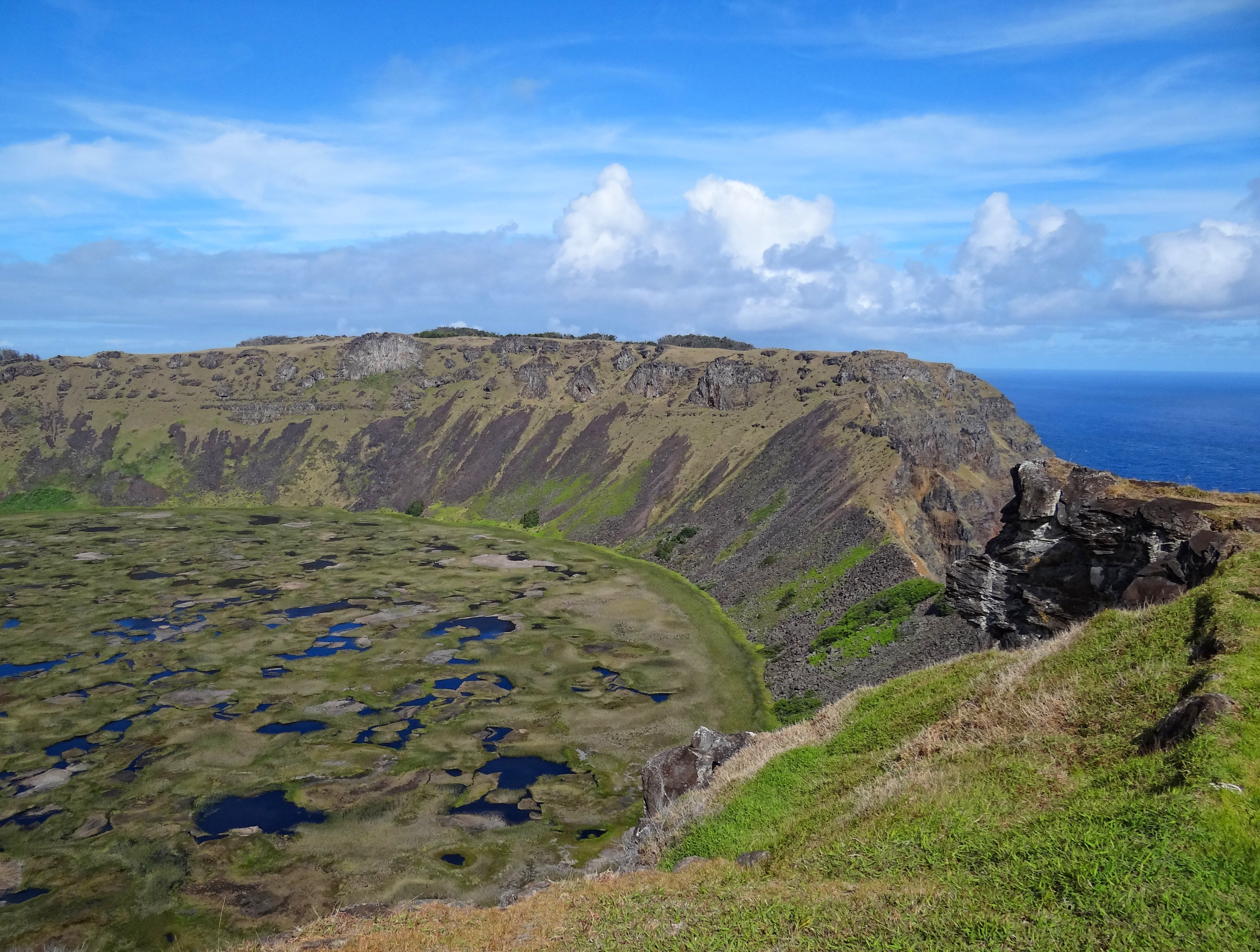
Rano Kau, Parque National Rapa Nui, Easter Island

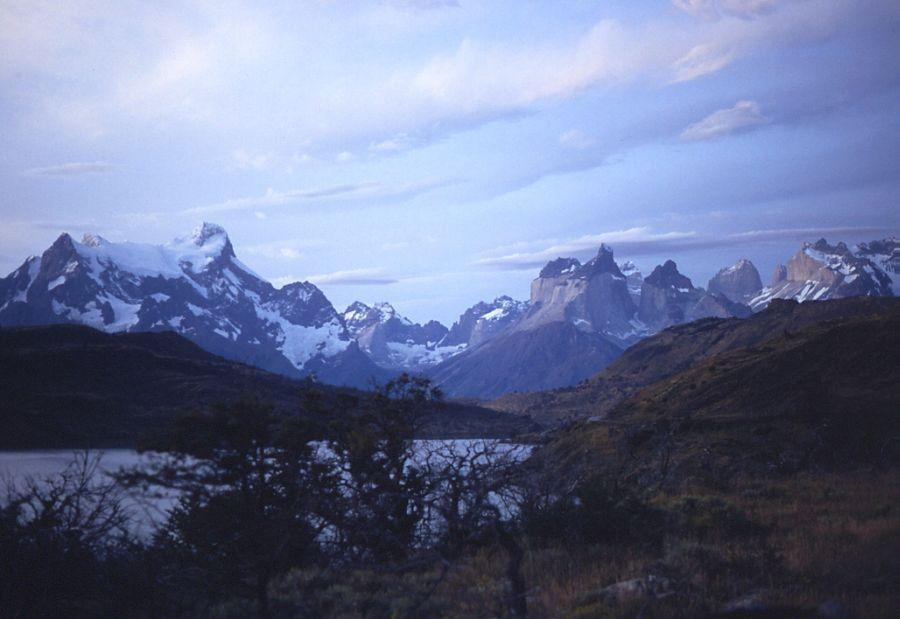
Torres del Paine National Park

The protected areas of Chile are areas that have natural beauty or significant historical value protected by the government of Chile. These protected areas cover over 140,000 km^{2} (54,054 sq mi), which is 19% of the territory of Chile. The National System of Protected Wild Areas (SNASPE by its Spanish acronym) is regulated by law #18,362 passed in 1984, and administered by the National Forest Corporation (CONAF).

There are three types of territories:

- National Parks
- National Reserves
- Natural Monuments

== Protected areas by type ==
=== National reserves ===
National reserves of Chile
Name	Photo	Natural region	Area	Established
Alto Bío Bío		Zona Central		1912
Altos de Lircay		Zona Central		1996
Altos de Pemehue				2009
China Muerta				1968
Coyhaique				1948
El Yali				1996
Federico Albert				1981
Futaleufú				1998
Isla Mocha		Zona Sur	23.69 km^{2} (9 sq mi)	1988
Lago Peñuelas		Zona Central	92.6 km^{2} (36 sq mi)	1952
Llanquihue		Zona Sur	161.1 km^{2} (62 sq mi)	1912
Los Flamencos		Norte Grande	740.0 km^{2} (286 sq mi)	1990
Malalcahuello-Nalcas		Zona Sur	12,789 ha (49 sq mi)	1931
Mocho-Choshuenco		Zona Sur	7,537.6 km^{2} (2,910 sq mi)	1994
Pampa del Tamarugal		Norte Grande	102,264 ha (395 sq mi)	1987
Pingüino de Humboldt		Norte Chico	859.3 ha (3 sq mi)	1990
Ralco		Zona Central	12,421 ha (48 sq mi)	1987
Río de Los Cipreses		Zona Central	36,882 ha (142 sq mi)	1985
Costera Valdiviana		Zona Sur	597 ha (2 sq mi)	2005

=== Natural monuments ===
Natural monuments of Chile
Name	Photo	Natural region	Area	Established
Cerro Ñielol		Zona Sur	0.89 km^{2} (0 sq mi)	1988
Cueva del Milodón		Zona Austral		1993
El Morado		Zona Central	30.09 km^{2} (12 sq mi)	
La Portada		Norte Grande	0.3127 km^{2} (0 sq mi)	1990
Los Pingüinos		Zona Austral	0.97 km^{2} (0 sq mi)	1966

=== Nature sanctuaries ===
(partial list)

- Acantilados Federico Santa María
- Carlos Anwandter Nature Sanctuary (Río Cruces y Chorocomayo)
- Cerro Coqui
- El Ajial
- Estero Quitralco
- Horcón de Piedra
- Humedal de Cutipay
- Humedales de Angachilla
- Humedales del Río Maullín
- Islote Pájaros Niños
- Laguna Tebenquiche
- Llancahue Nature Sanctuary
- Meullín-Puye Nature Sanctuary
- Península de Hualpén Nature Sanctuary
- Quebrada de La Plata
- Río Cochiguaz Nature Sanctuary
- San Juan de Piche
- Serranía el Ciprés
- Yerba Loca Nature Sanctuary

=== Marine protected areas ===
==== Marine and coastal protected areas ====
- Coral Nui Nui Marine and Coastal Protected Area
- Francisco Coloane Marine and Coastal Protected Area
- Hanga Oteo Marine and Coastal Protected Area
- Las Cruces Marine and Coastal Protected Area
- Mar de Juan Fernández Marine and Coastal Protected Area
- Pitipalena-Añihue Marine and Coastal Protected Area
- Rapa Nui Marine and Coastal Protected Area
- Seno Almirantazgo Marine and Coastal Protected Area
- Tortel Marine and Coastal Protected Area

==== Marine parks ====
- El Arenal Marine Park
- El Palillo Marine Park
- Islas Diego Ramírez y Paso Drake
- Lobería Selkirk Marine Park
- Mar de Juan Fernández Marine Park
- Montes submarinos Crusoe y Selkirk Marine Park
- Motu Motiro Hiva Marine Park
- Nazca-Desventuradas Marine Park
- TicToc-Golfo Corcovado Marine Park
- Tierra Blanca Marine Park

==== Marine reserves ====
- Bahía Moreno - La Rinconada
- Isla Chañaral Marine Reserve
- Islas Choros - Damas
- Pullinque Marine Reserve
- Putemún Marine Reserve

== Protected areas by region ==
=== Arica and Parinacota Region ===
- Las Vicuñas National Reserve
- Lauca National Park
- Salar de Surire Natural Monument

=== Tarapacá Region ===
- Pampa del Tamarugal National Reserve
- Volcán Isluga National Park

=== Antofagasta Region ===
- Alto Loa National Reserve
- La Chimba National Reserve
- La Portada Natural Monument
- Llullaillaco National Park
- Los Flamencos National Reserve
- North Paposo National Monument

=== Atacama Region ===
- Llanos de Challe National Park
- Nevado Tres Cruces National Park
- Pan de Azúcar National Park
- Pingüino de Humboldt National Reserve

=== Coquimbo Region ===
- Bosque de Fray Jorge National Park
- Las Chinchillas National Reserve
- Pichasca Natural Monument (in Spanish)

=== Valparaíso Region ===
- Archipiélago de Juan Fernández National Park
- El Yali National Reserve
- Isla Cachagua Natural Monument (in Spanish)
- La Campana National Park
- Lago Peñuelas National Reserve
- Rapa Nui National Park
- Río Blanco National Reserve

=== Santiago Metropolitan Region ===
- El Morado Natural Monument
- Río Clarillo National Reserve
- Roblería del Cobre de Loncha National Reserve
- Yerba Loca Nature Sanctuary

=== O'Higgins Region ===
- Las Palmas de Cocalán National Park
- Río Los Cipreses National Reserve

=== Maule Region ===
- Altos de Lircay National Reserve
- Federico Albert National Reserve
- Laguna Torca National Reserve
- Los Bellotos del Melado National Reserve
- Los Queules National Reserve
- Los Ruiles National Reserve
- Radal Siete Tazas National Reserve

=== Bío-Bío Region ===
- Isla Mocha National Reserve
- Laguna del Laja National Park
- Los Huemules de Niblinto National Reserve
- Ñuble National Reserve
- Península de Hualpén Nature Sanctuary
- Ralco National Reserve

=== Araucanía Region ===
- Alto Biobío National Reserve
- Cerro Ñielol Natural Monument
- China Muerta National Reserve
- Conguillío National Park
- Contulmo Natural Monument (in Spanish)
- Huerquehue National Park
- Malalcahuello National Reserve
- Malleco National Reserve
- Nahuelbuta National Park
- Nalcas National Reserve
- Tolhuaca National Park
- Villarrica National Park
- Villarrica National Reserve

=== Los Ríos Region ===
- Alerce Costero National Park
- Área Costera Protegida Punta Curiñanco
- Carlos Anwandter Nature Sanctuary
- Huilo-Huilo Biological Reserve
- Mocho-Choshuenco National Reserve
- Oncol Park
- Puyehue National Park
- Valdivia National Reserve
- Valdivian Coastal Reserve
- Villarrica National Park

=== Los Lagos Region ===
- Alerce Andino National Park
- Chiloé National Park
- Corcovado National Park
- Futaleufú National Reserve
- Hornopirén National Park
- Islotes de Puñihuil Natural Monument
- Lago Palena National Reserve
- Lahuen Ñadi Natural Monument
- Llanquihue National Reserve
- Los Vertientes Private Nature Reserve
- Pumalín Douglas Tompkins National Park
- Puyehue National Park
- Tantauco Park
- Vicente Pérez Rosales National Park

=== Aisén Region ===
- Bernardo O'Higgins National Park
- Cerro Castillo National Reserve
- Cinco Hermanas Natural Monument (in Spanish)
- Coihaique National Reserve
- Dos Lagunas Natural Monument
- Isla Guamblin National Park
- Isla Magdalena National Park
- Katalalixar National Reserve
- Lago Carlota National Reserve
- Lago Cochrane National Reserve
- Lago Jeinimeni National Reserve
- Lago Las Torres National Reserve
- Lago Rosselot National Reserve
- Laguna de San Rafael National Park
- Las Guaitecas National Reserve
- Meullín-Puye Nature Sanctuary
- Patagonia National Park
- Queulat National Park
- Río Simpson National Reserve
- Trapananda National Reserve

=== Magallanes and Antartica Chilena Region ===
- Alberto de Agostini National Park
- Bernardo O'Higgins National Park
- Cabo de Hornos National Park
- Cueva del Milodón Natural Monument
- Francisco Coloane Marine and Coastal Protected Area
- Kawésqar National Park
- Laguna de los Cisnes Natural Monument (in Spanish)
- Laguna Parrillar National Reserve
- Los Pingüinos Natural Monument
- Magallanes National Reserve
- Omora Ethnobotanical Park
- Pali-Aike National Park
- Torres del Paine National Park
- Yendegaia National Park

== See also ==
- National Monuments of Chile
