= La Portada =

La Portada Natural Monument
- IUCN category III (natural monument or feature)
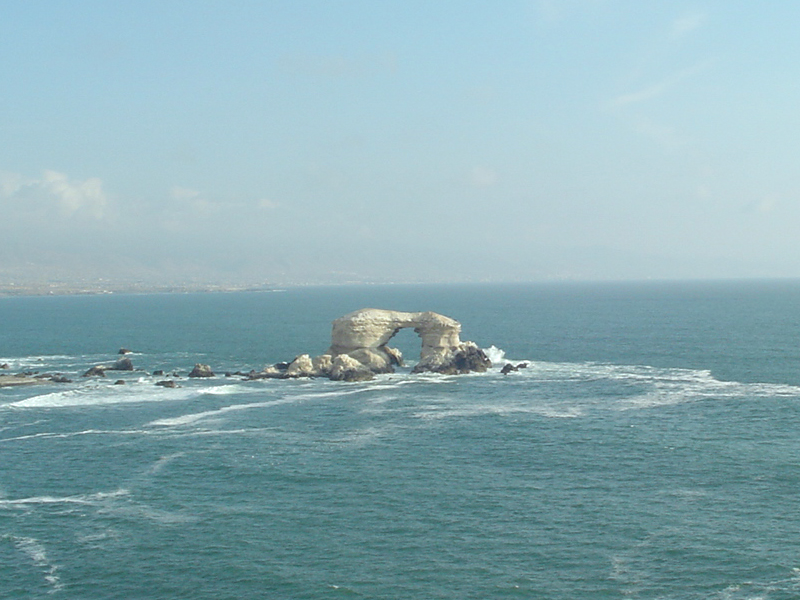
- La Portada Natural Monument
- Interactive map of La Portada Natural Monument
- Location: Antofagasta Region, Chile
- Coordinates: 23°30′23″S 70°25′37″W
- Area: 0.3127 km^{2} (0.1207 sq mi)
- Governing body: Corporación Nacional Forestal

La Portada (Spanish: "The Gateway") is a natural arch on the coast of Chile, 18 km (11 mi) north of Antofagasta. It is one of fifteen natural monuments included among the protected areas of Chile.

There is another similar but smaller structure in the spa town of Pucatrihue, Osorno Province.

== Description ==
The La Portada Natural Monument covers an area of 31.27 hectares (77.27 acres), and its geomorphological features and remaining fossils stand out in the form of an arch.

The arch of La Portada is 43 m (140 ft) high, 23 m (75 ft) wide, and 70 m (230 ft) long. It has a base of black andesite stone, around which are arranged marine sedimentary rocks, a stratum of yellowing sandstone, and layers of the remaining fossils of shells dating back 35 to 2 million years ago. All this was formed during a long process of marine erosion.

The arch is surrounded by coastal cliffs that were also formed by marine erosion. They reach a maximum height of 52 m above sea level.

On 5 October 1990, it was declared a natural monument under Supreme Decree #51 of the Ministry of Agriculture, published in the Diario Oficial.

Between 2003 and 2008, the monument was closed due to a landslide of an important part of its cliffs, which required remodeling of the access route and its surroundings.

Since 2010, access to the beach is prohibited to protect the flora and fauna.

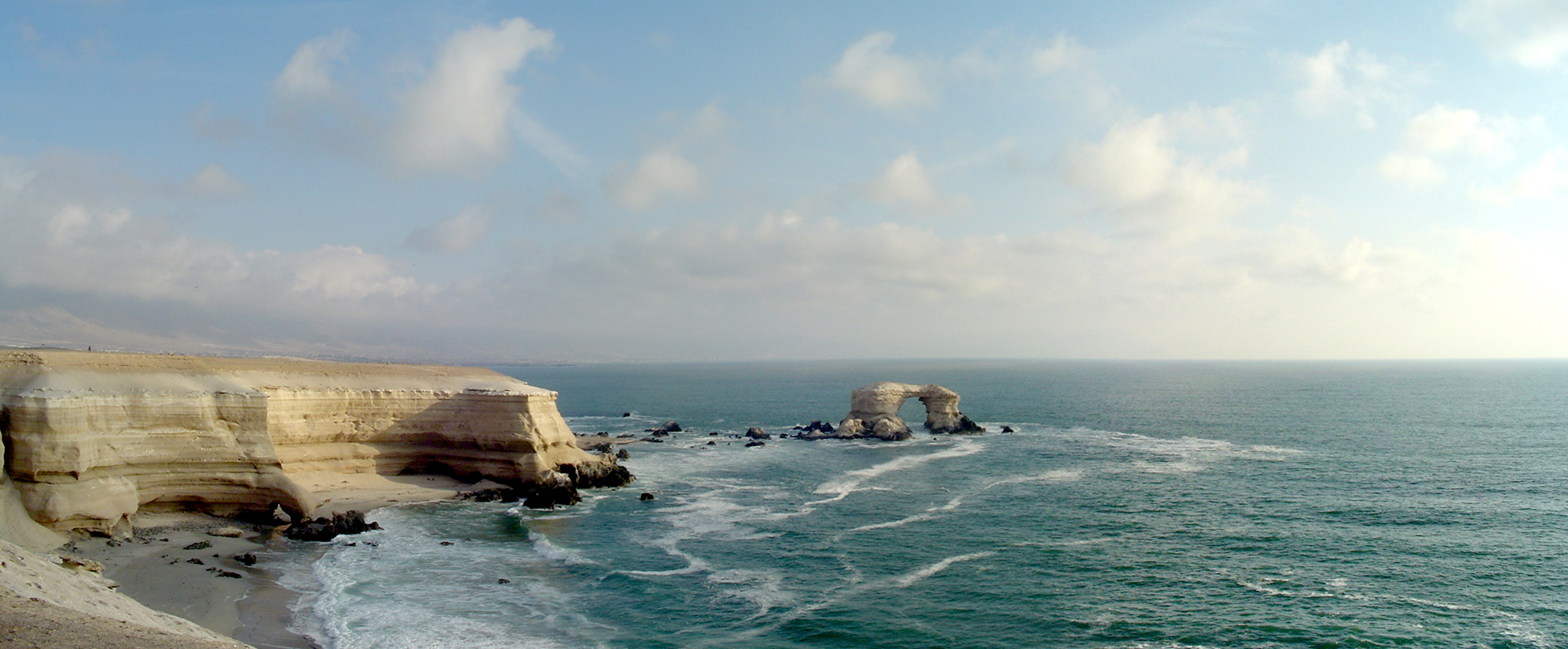
Panorama of La Portada Natural Monument

== Fauna ==
The natural monument constitutes an observation site for guano birds such as Peruvian booby (Sula variegata) and Inca terns (Larosterna inca), as well as Guanay cormorants (Phalacrocorax bougainvillii), kelp gulls (Larus dominicanus), grey gulls (Larus modestus), Belcher's gulls (Larus belcheri), and pelicans.

Occasionally one can also observe mammals such as the South American fur seal (Arctocephalus australis) or the common dolphin (Delphinus delphis).

== Access ==
La Portada is located 18 km (11 mi) north of Antofagasta, which can be accessed by Route 1 Antofagasta-Tocopilla, from which an access road diverges at kilometer 20.

The monument is found near the Cerro Moreno International Airport and La Chimba National Reserve.
