= Bosques Templados Lluviosos de los Andes Australes =

Coordinates: 41°18′S 72°14′W

Bosques Templados LLuviosos de los Andes Australes (Temperate Rain forests of the Austral Andes) is a Biosphere Reserve in southern Chile. It was declared a Biosphere Reserve by UNESCO in 2007. The reserve protects a large portion of the Valdivian temperate rain forest ecoregion. At least three tree species found in the reserve are listed by CITES as threatened, namely Fitzroya cupressoides, Araucaria araucana and Pilgerodendron uviferum.

The reserve comprises the following protected areas:

- Villarrica National Park (Partially)
- Puyehue National Park
- Vicente Pérez Rosales National Park
- Alerce Andino National Park
- Hornopirén National Park
- Mocho-Choshuenco National Reserve
- Llanquihue National Reserve
- Futaleufú National Reserve
