= Futaleufú =

Futaleufú, a Mapudungun word meaning "Big River", may refer to:

- Futaleufú River
- Futaleufú Department, Argentina
- Futaleufú, Chile
- Futaleufú National Reserve
