= Torca Airport =

- IATA: none; ICAO: SCLI

Summary
- Airport type: Public
- Serves: Llico, Chile
- Elevation AMSL: 66 ft / 20 m
- Coordinates: 34°47′00″S 72°03′04″W

Map
- Location of Torca Airport in Chile

Runways
Direction	Length		Surface
Direction	m	ft	Surface
02/20	775	2,543	Asphalt
- Source: Landings.com Google Maps GCM

Torca Airport (Spanish: Aeropuerto Torca), (ICAO: SCLI) is an airport serving the Laguna Torca National Reserve, and Llico, a Pacific coastal village in the Maule Region of Chile.

The airport sits east of the village, between Laguna Torca and Vichuquén Lake (es). There are hills and rising terrain in all quadrants. Approach and departure from either end are over the lakes.

== See also ==
- Transport in Chile
- List of airports in Chile
