= Trapananda =

Trapananda can refer to:

- Trapananda National Reserve
- City of the Caesars
