= Santa Inés Island =

Island in Chile

Santa Inés
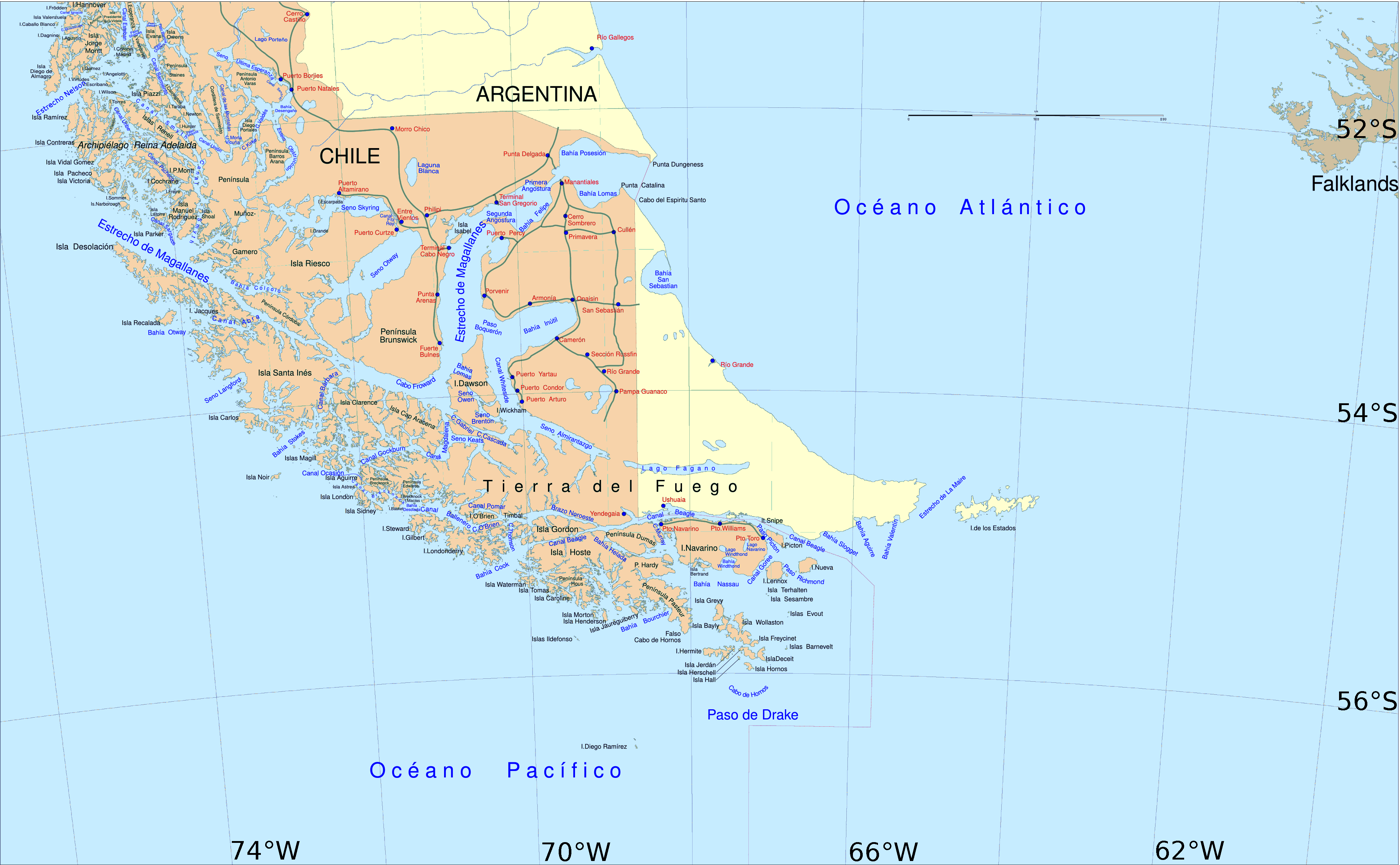
- Desolación Island at the west entrance of the Strait of Magellan. Click on the image to obtain the big map

- Location within Chile

Geography
- Location: Zona Austral
- Coordinates: 53°45′S 72°45′W
- Archipelago: Tierra del Fuego archipelago
- Area: 3,688 km^{2} (1,424 sq mi)
- Highest elevation: 1,341 m (4400 ft)

Administration
- Chile
- Region: Magallanes
- Province: Magallanes
- Commune: Punta Arenas

Santa Inés Island (Spanish: Isla Santa Inés) is an island in southern Chile, part of the Tierra del Fuego archipelago and of Punta Arenas municipality, lying south west of the Brunswick Peninsula, from which is separated by the Strait of Magellan and minor islands. It is the largest island of Punta Arenas municipality and the third largest of the Tierra del Fuego archipelago, after Isla Grande and Hoste Island. Its shoreline in this area is part of the Francisco Coloane Marine and Coastal Protected Area. The rest of the island is a part of the Alacalufes National Reserve, equalling that Desolación Island and the Córdova Peninsula. This latter is located in front of the island on the other side of the Strait of Magellan and is a peninsula of Riesco Island. The island belongs to the Tierra del Fuego archipelago.

The island hosts a small ice field named Grandes Ventisqueros. It has a deeply indented coastline with several fjords, one of which hid the German light cruiser Dresden following the battle of the Falkland Islands in December 1914.

First explorer of Santa Inés Island inland was the French writer and mountaineer Marc Augier in 1951, as he related in his work Monts Pacifique.
