= Isla Mocha National Reserve =

National reserve in the Bío Bío Region, Chile

- IUCN category IV (habitat/species management area)
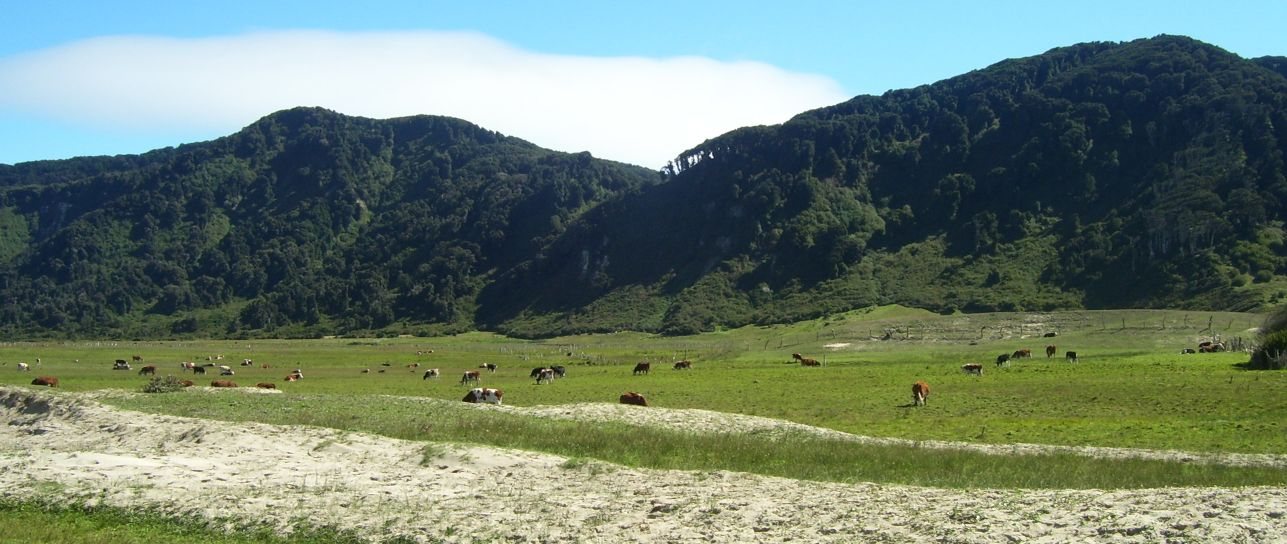
- Interactive map of Isla Mocha National Reserve
- Location: Biobío Region, Chile
- Coordinates: 38°22′S 73°55′W
- Area: 21.82 km^{2} (8.42 sq mi)
- Established: 1988
- Governing body: Corporación Nacional Forestal

Isla Mocha National Reserve is a national reserve of Chile. It occupies the central portion of Mocha Island. It is located in Tirúa, Arauco Province, Bío Bío Region, Chile.

The reserve provides habitat for the pudú and for a variety of birds, including the pink-footed shearwater. Typical vegetation includes Olivillo, Chilean Myrtle, Valdivia's Patagua, Chilean Laurel, Tepa and Winter's Bark.

== Camino Nuevo Trail ==
The route is approximately 1 hour and a half, and is signposted and clear. It crosses the island from east to west, and you walk along a path of virgin nature with ferns, mosses, Nalcas, Olivillos, Notros, Canelos, Pellines, Avellanos, and Arrayanes of great size, and fauna with a variety of species such as La Fárdela Castellana or white, Choroy, Cachañas and the beautiful Chucao. At the end of this trail you will reach a viewpoint with an impressive view of the old lighthouse.
