= Río Los Cipreses National Reserve =

Nature reserve in Chile

- IUCN category IV (habitat/species management area)
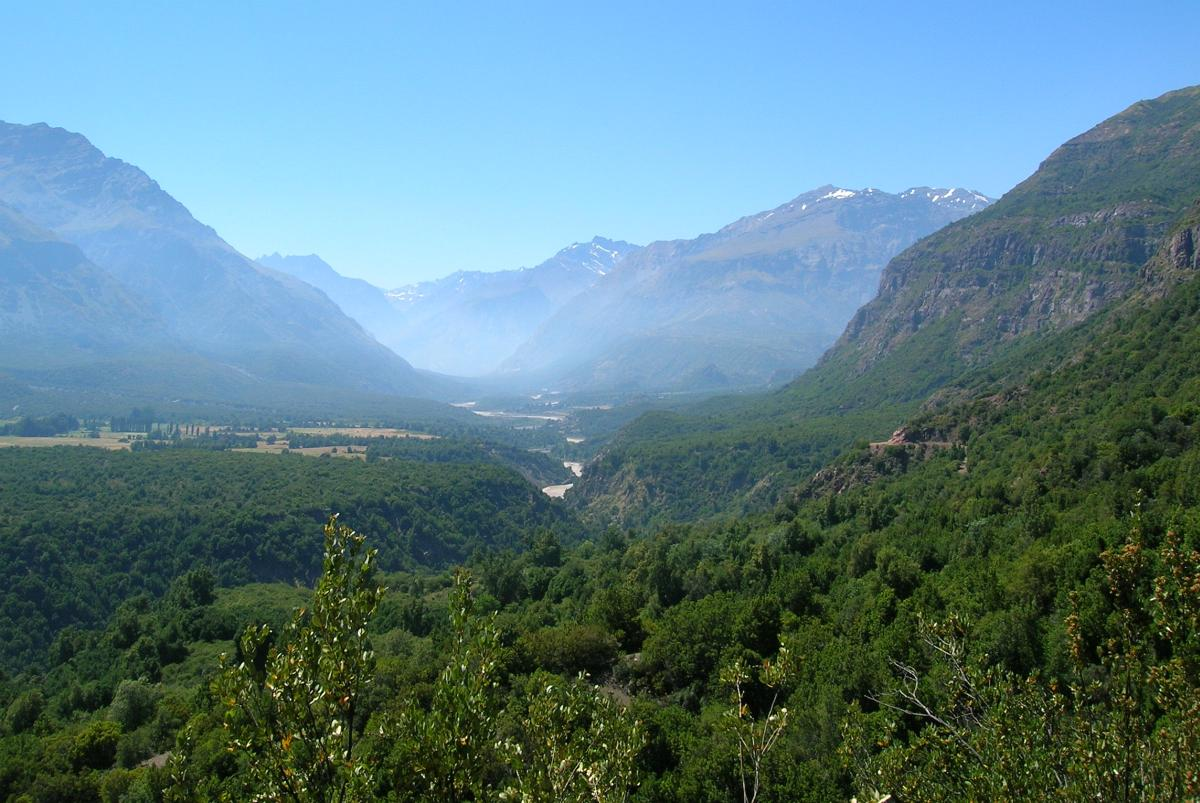

- Location within Chile
- Location: Libertador General Bernardo O'Higgins Region, Chile
- Coordinates: 34°27′54″S 70°27′18″W
- Area: 385.82 km^{2} (148.97 sq mi)
- Established: 1986
- Governing body: Corporación Nacional Forestal (CONAF)

Río Los Cipreses National Reserve is a nature reserve located in Machalí, Libertador General Bernardo O'Higgins Region, Chile. It is named after Río Los Cipreses, a tributary of Cachapoal River and lies in one of the most glaciated areas of the Central Chile Andes.

The reserve contains Valdivian temperate forests at lower elevations and Southern Andean steppe at higher elevations. It also protects some of the northernmost stands of Austrocedrus chilensis.

The reserve is used by mountain climbers, and is home to a number mountain trails, including the Palomo volcano, Alto de Los Arrieros and Cerro Dr. Hernán Cruz. In addition to the mountains, the reserve contains various prehispanic petroglyphs and an array of flora and fauna.

As of 2012, public transport to the reserve is either extremely limited or non-existent, and travelling there by private vehicle is recommended. A limited number of tour operators in Rancagua offer trips to the reserve.

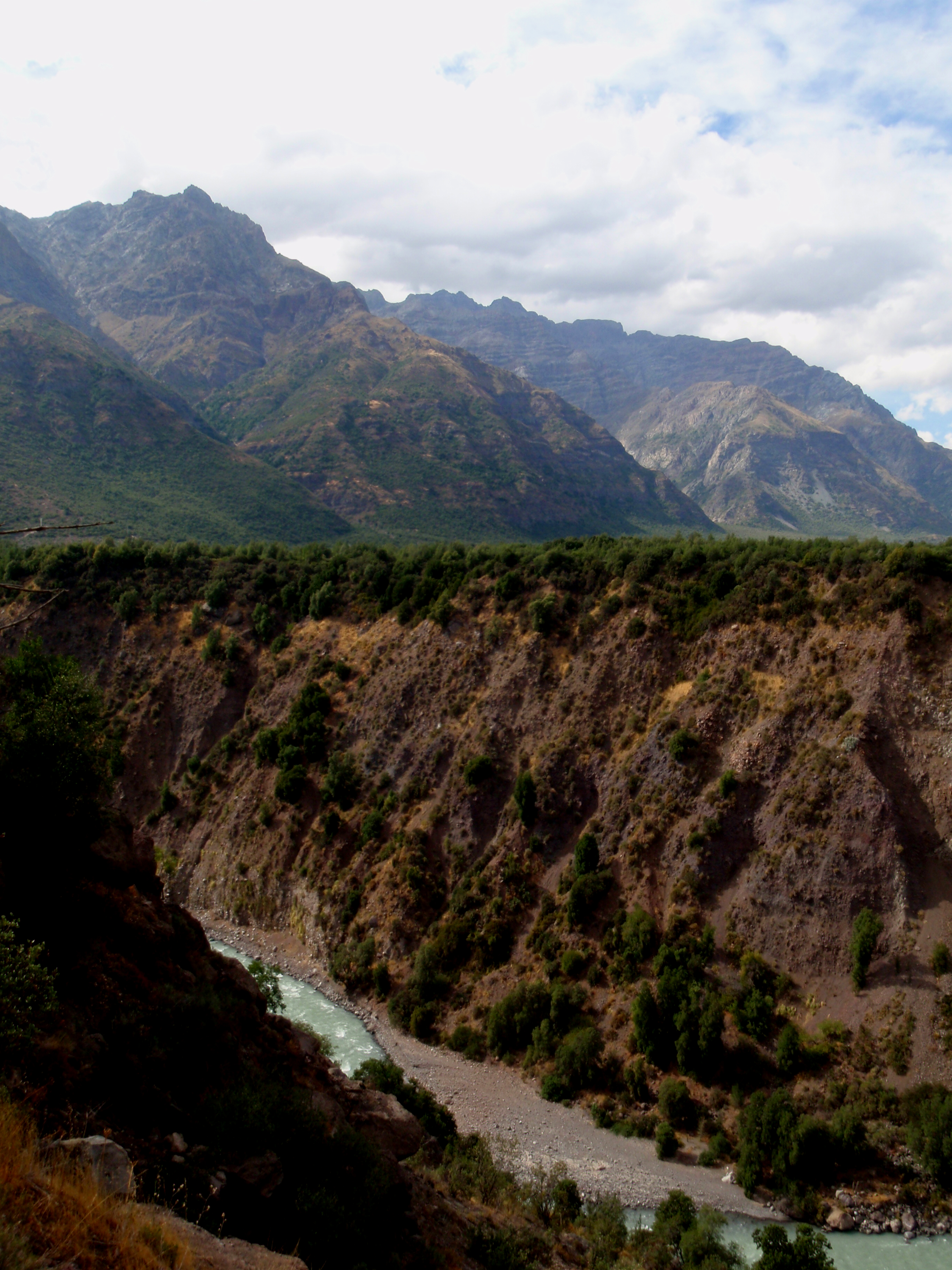
River and gorge running through the center of the reserve.

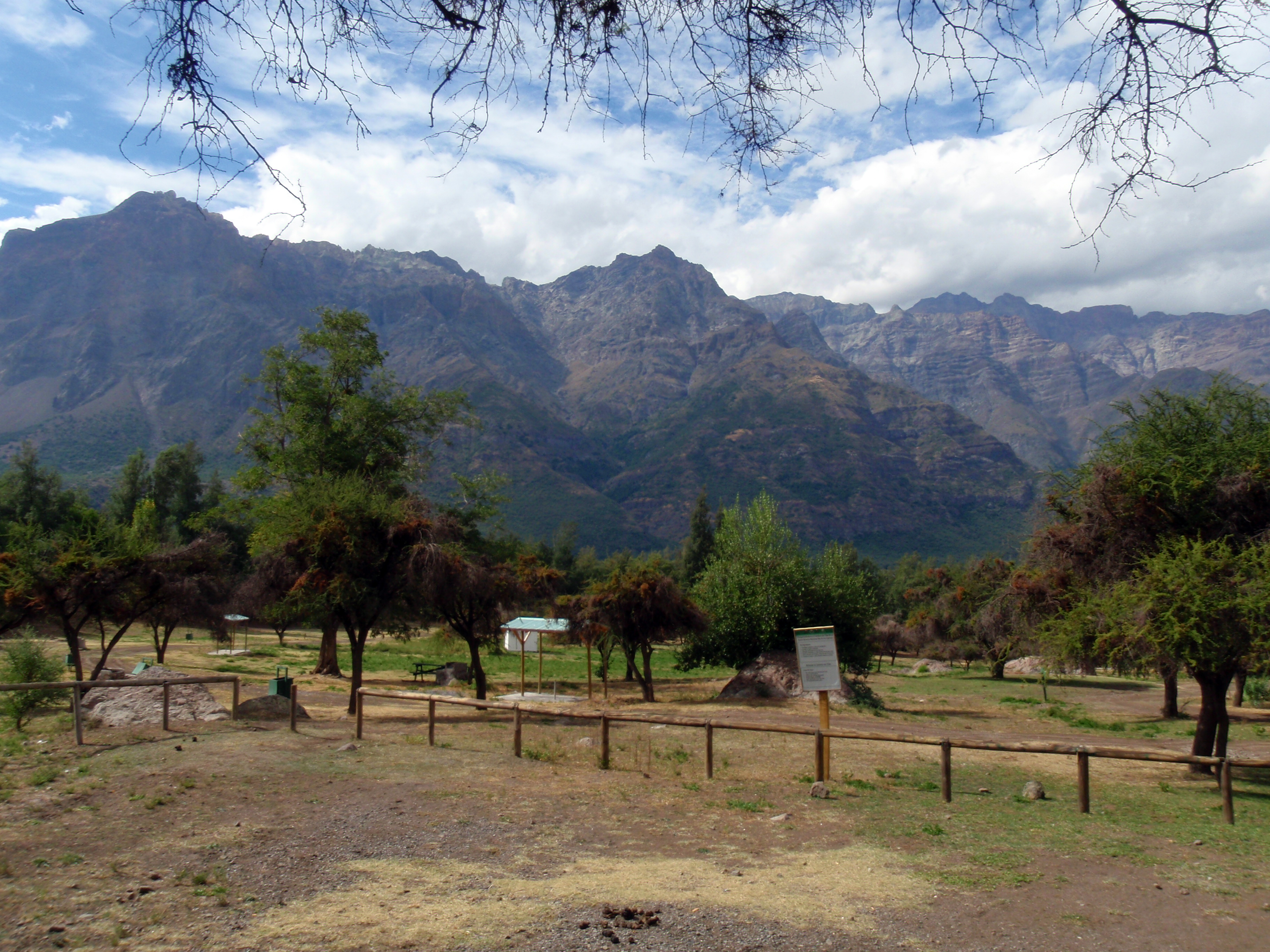
Picnic area of the reserve.
