= Francisco Coloane =

Chilean writer (1910–2002)

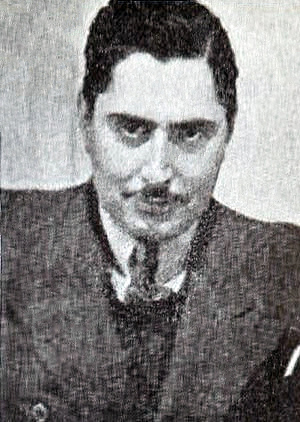
- Coloane in 1940
- Born: July 19, 1910; Quemchi, Chiloé, Chile
- Died: August 5, 2002 (aged 92); Santiago, Chile
- Known for: won Chilean National Prize for Literature, 1964

Francisco Coloane Cárdenas (Latin American Spanish: [fɾanˈsisko koloˈane]; July 19, 1910 – August 5, 2002) was a Chilean novelist and short fiction writer whose works have been translated into many languages. Some of his books were adapted to theatre and film.

== Biography ==
He was born in Quemchi, Chiloé Province, on the southern Chilean island of Chiloé, and his literary career expanded from Perros, Caballos y Hombres ("Dogs, Horses and Men") in 1935 to the publication of his memoirs Los Pasos del Hombre (The Steps of Man) in 2000.

Among his most famous works (translated into English, French, Italian, Greek, German, Polish and Dutch) are: La Tierra del Fuego se Apagó (Tierra del Fuego Has Burnt Out, 1945), Golfo de Penas (Gulf of Sorrow, 1957), El Camino de la Ballena (The Whale's Path, 1962), El Guanaco Blanco (The White Guanaco, 1980), and El Corazón del Témpano (The Heart of the Iceberg, 1991).

Coloane was awarded the Premio Nacional de Literatura (Chilean National Prize for Literature) in 1964. In 1997, he was awarded the Ordre des Arts et des Lettres (Order of Arts and Letters) by the French Republic, where he won considerable notoriety for his work in the 1990s.

Coloane was an active member of the Communist Party of Chile for most of his adult life, and a lover of nature who celebrated his 89th birthday by swimming in the freezing waters of the Pacific Ocean – which in his opinion kept him "vital and active".

Miguel Littín's movie, Tierra del Fuego, is based on a work by Coloane.

Following his death, the Chilean government recognized him as a central figure of 20th-century Chilean literature.

== Selected works ==
- Cabo de Hornos (Cape Horn, 1941)
- El último grumete de la Baquedano (1941)
- La Tierra del Fuego se apagó (Tierra del Fuego Has Burnt Out, 1945)
- Golfo de Penas (1945)
- Los Conquistadores de la Antártida (1945)
- Tierra del Fuego (1956), translated by David Petreman and Howard Curtis, Europa Editions (2008) ISBN 1-933372-63-X
- El Camino de la ballena (The Whale's Path, 1962)
- El Chilote Otey y otros relatos (1971)
- Cuentos completos (Complete Stories, 1999)
- The Stowaway (1964)

== See also ==
- Francisco Coloane Marine and Coastal Protected Area
