= Federico Albert (conservationist) =

Chilean botanist, ornithologist and silviculturist (1867–1928)

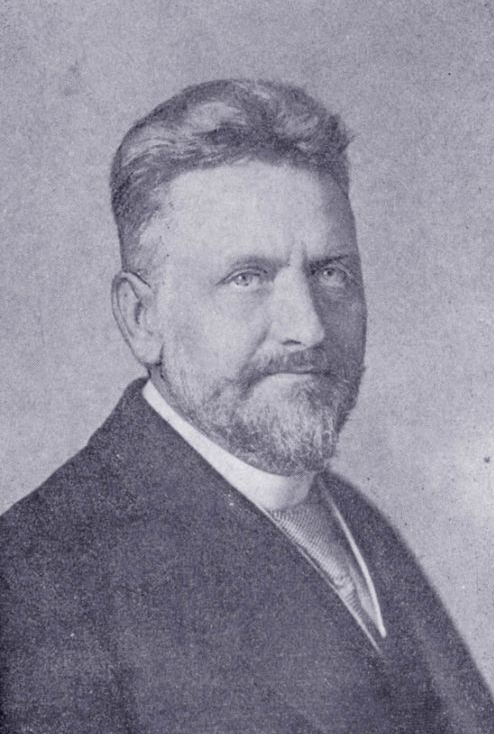
Federico Albert c. 1910

Federico Albert born Friedrich Albert Faupp (8 November 1867, Berlin, Germany – 9 November 1928, Chile) was a German-born Chilean forester, museum collector, and conservationist. He has been called the father of conservation in Chile. The Federico Albert National Reserve is named after him.

== Life and work ==
Albert was born in Berlin and used his maternal surname Faupp. He was educated at the Dorothea Realgymnasium and at the Ludwig-Maximilians-Universität München where he studied embryology, histology and anatomy. He went to work at the Chile museum under Rodulfo Armando Philippi in 1889 to help prepare specimens. He lived in Santiago where his son Tótila Albert Schneider (1892-1967) was born. In 1898, he became a head of the ministry of industry's division of zoology and botany. He was involved in measures to introduce animals and plants for economic purposes. He examined the loss of fertile lands in Chanco due to shifting dunes and was involved in afforestation in attempts to prevent soil loss. In 1903, he examined forest losses due to railway construction and helped establish laws to prevent deforestation. In the same year he was sent to obtain salmon eggs from Germany for introduction into Chile. He then travelled across Europe and returned to Chile in 1905. He worked with Ernesto Maldonado who headed the forestry department under Albert. In 1909, he was posted as part of a commission to help reorganize forest administration, and he went to study in Europe. In 1911, he was inspector general of forests, fishing and hunting. He retired in 1917.
