= Villarrica National Park =

National park in central Chile

- IUCN category II (national park)
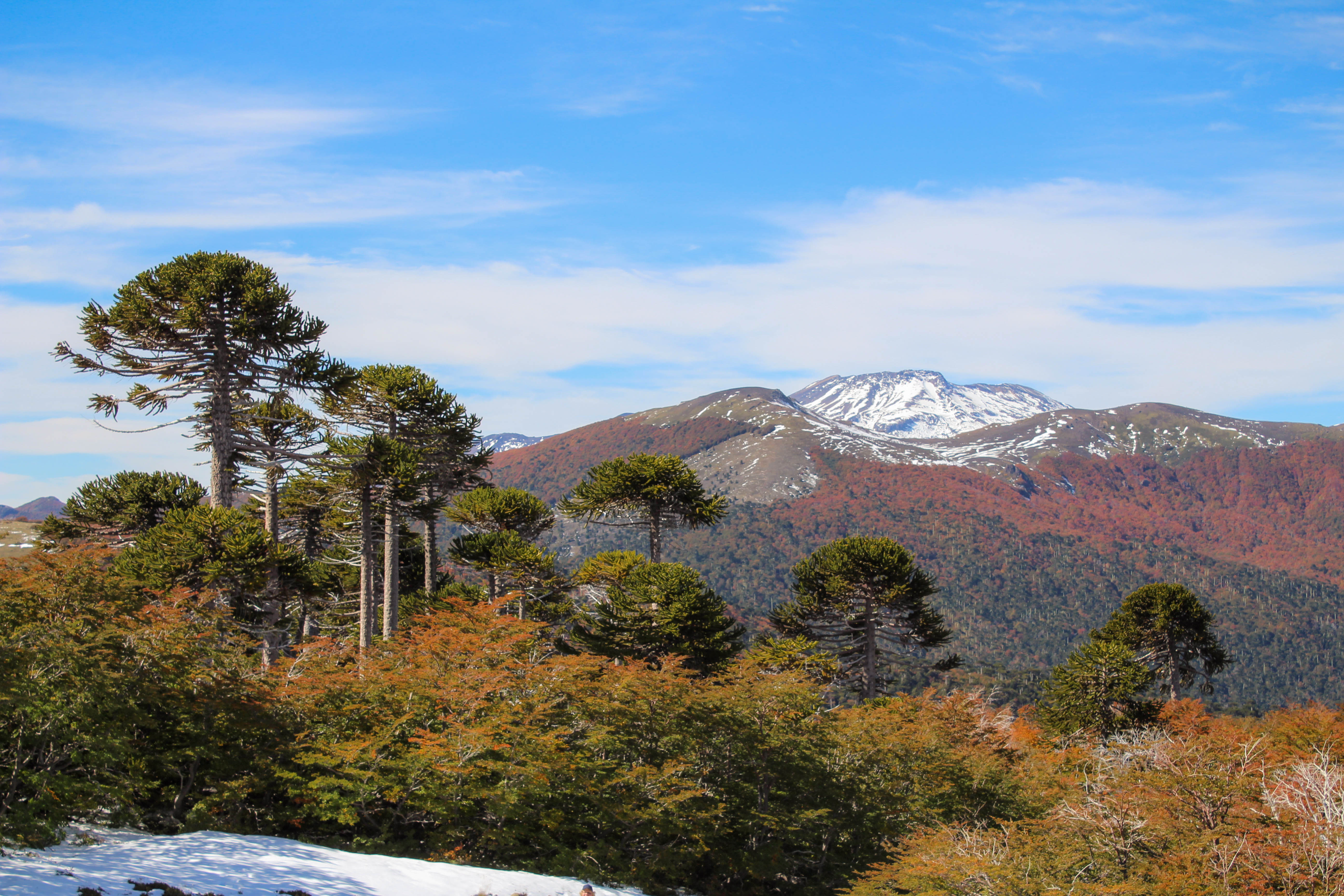
- View of Villarrica National Park
- Interactive map of Villarrica National Park
- Location: La Araucanía and Los Ríos regions, Chile
- Nearest city: Pucón
- Coordinates: 39°25′S 71°56′W
- Area: 630 km^{2} (243 sq mi)
- Established: 1940
- Visitors: 115,761 (in 2012)
- Governing body: Corporación Nacional Forestal

Villarrica National Park is located in the Andes, in the La Araucanía and Los Ríos regions of Chile, near Pucón. The centerpiece of the park is a line of three volcanoes stretching transversely to the Andean range: Villarrica, Quetrupillán, and Lanín. Other mountains in the park include Quinquilil volcano (2,050 m (6,726 ft)), also known as Colmillo del Diablo, and Cerro Las Peinetas, which lies on the border between Argentina and Chile. It ranges in elevation from 600 m (1,969 ft) to 3,776 m (12,388 ft) at Lanín Volcano.

The drainage divide between the Toltén River drainage basin and the Valdivia River basin runs through the park and marks the boundary between the Cautín Province and the Valdivia Province.

A portion of the park is included in the Bosques Templados Lluviosos de los Andes Australes Biosphere Reserve.

== Flora and fauna ==
The park protects Valdivian temperate rainforest habitat. Roble (Nothofagus obliqua) and Raulí (Nothofagus alpina) trees are found at lower elevations. Coihues occur in the wettest areas. At higher elevations, forests are dominated by the Araucarias (Araucaria araucana).

The park's forests provide habitat for wildlife such as pumas, chillas, culpeos, pudúes, coypus, Harris's hawks, lesser grisons, Molina's hog-nosed skunks, and the rare monitos del monte.

== Hot springs ==
The Termas Geométricas hot springs system is located in a ravine in the park forest. The system consists of 60 hot springs and cold waterfalls that are accessible to visitors on a series of rambling wooden plank boardwalks.
