= Laguna Parrillar National Reserve =

- IUCN category IV (habitat/species management area)
- Interactive map of Laguna Parrillar National Reserve
- Location: Magallanes and Antártica Chilena Region, Chile
- Coordinates: 53°21′58″S 71°21′23″W
- Area: 18,814 ha (46,490 acres)
- Established: April 22, 1977
- Visitors: 3,517 (in 2016)
- Governing body: Corporación Nacional Forestal

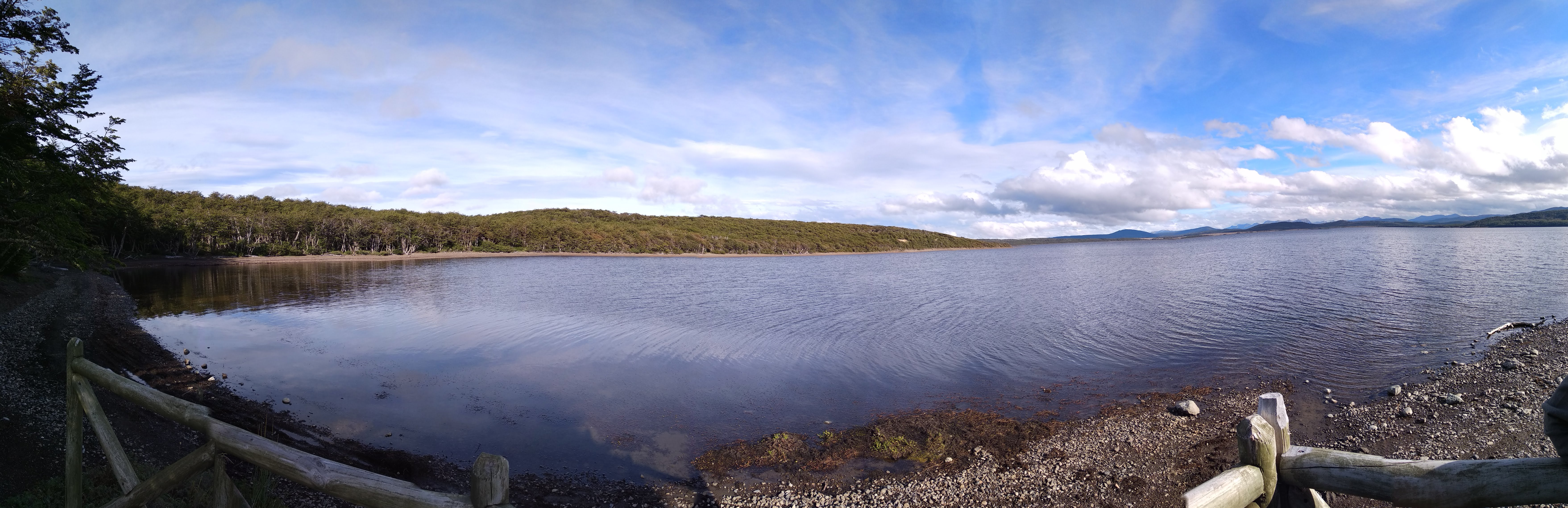
Panorama of the reserve

Laguna Parrillar National Reserve is a national reserve of southern Chile's Magallanes and Antártica Chilena Region.
