= Las Palmas de Cocalán National Park =

National park in Chile

La Palmas de Cocalán National Park
- IUCN category II (national park)
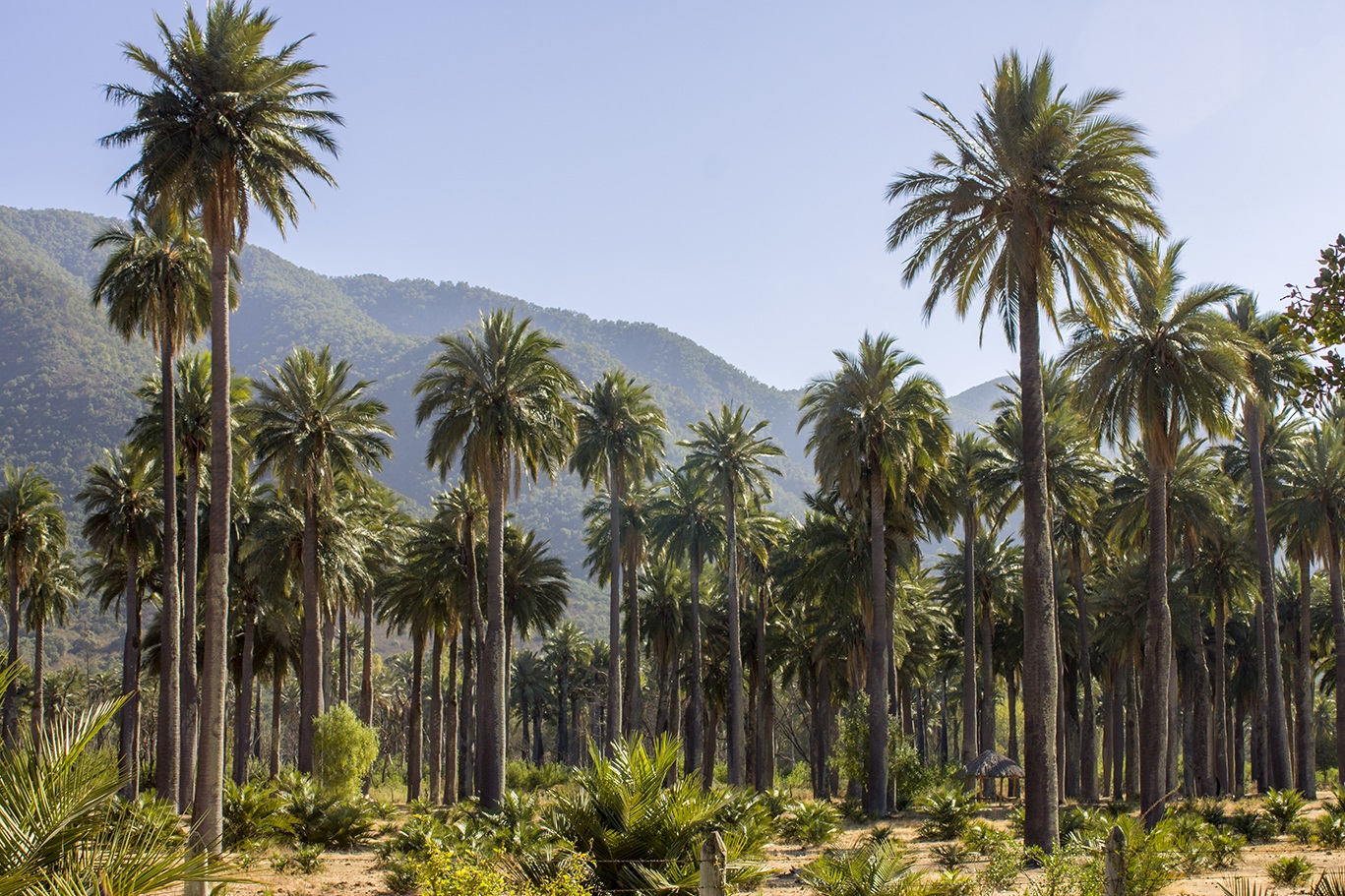
- Chilean Palm of Cocalán Basin, endemic to Chile and one of the world's southernmost, is endemic to central Chile and can live more than 1,000 years
- Interactive map of La Palmas de Cocalán National Park
- Location: Libertador General Bernardo O'Higgins Region, Chile
- Nearest city: Rengo
- Coordinates: 34°9′34″S 71°14′50″W
- Area: 3.709 km^{2} (1.432 sq mi)
- Established: 1971
- Governing body: Corporación Nacional Forestal

Las Palmas de Cocalán National Park is in the Cordillera de la Costa, Cachapoal Province, in the Libertador General Bernardo O'Higgins Region of Chile.

The now rare Jubaea chilensis (Chilean palm) is endemic in this park and only a few other places nearby, but is subject to predation.
