= Malleco National Reserve =

National Reserve in Chile

- IUCN category IV (habitat/species management area)
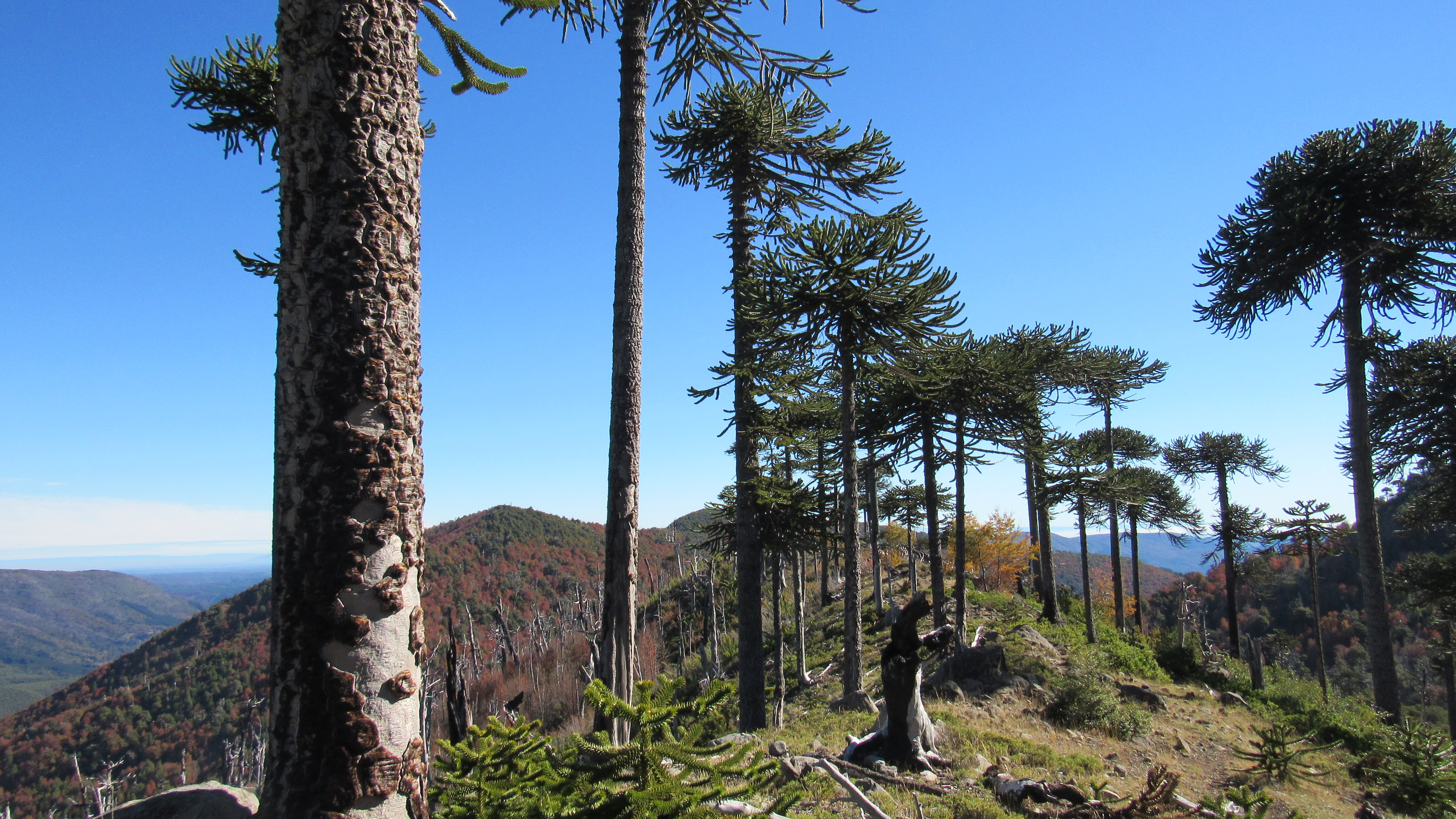
- Araucaria araucana trees in Malleco National Reserve
- Interactive map of Malleco National Reserve
- Location: Araucanía Region, Chile
- Coordinates: 38.1333°S 71.7833°W
- Area: 166.23 km^{2} (64.18 sq mi)
- Designated: 1907
- Governing body: Corporación Nacional Forestal (CONAF)

Malleco National Reserve is a national reserve in Araucanía Region of Chile. It was established in 1907, and covers an area of 166.23 km^{2}.
