= Cerro Ñielol Natural Monument =

- IUCN category III (natural monument or feature)
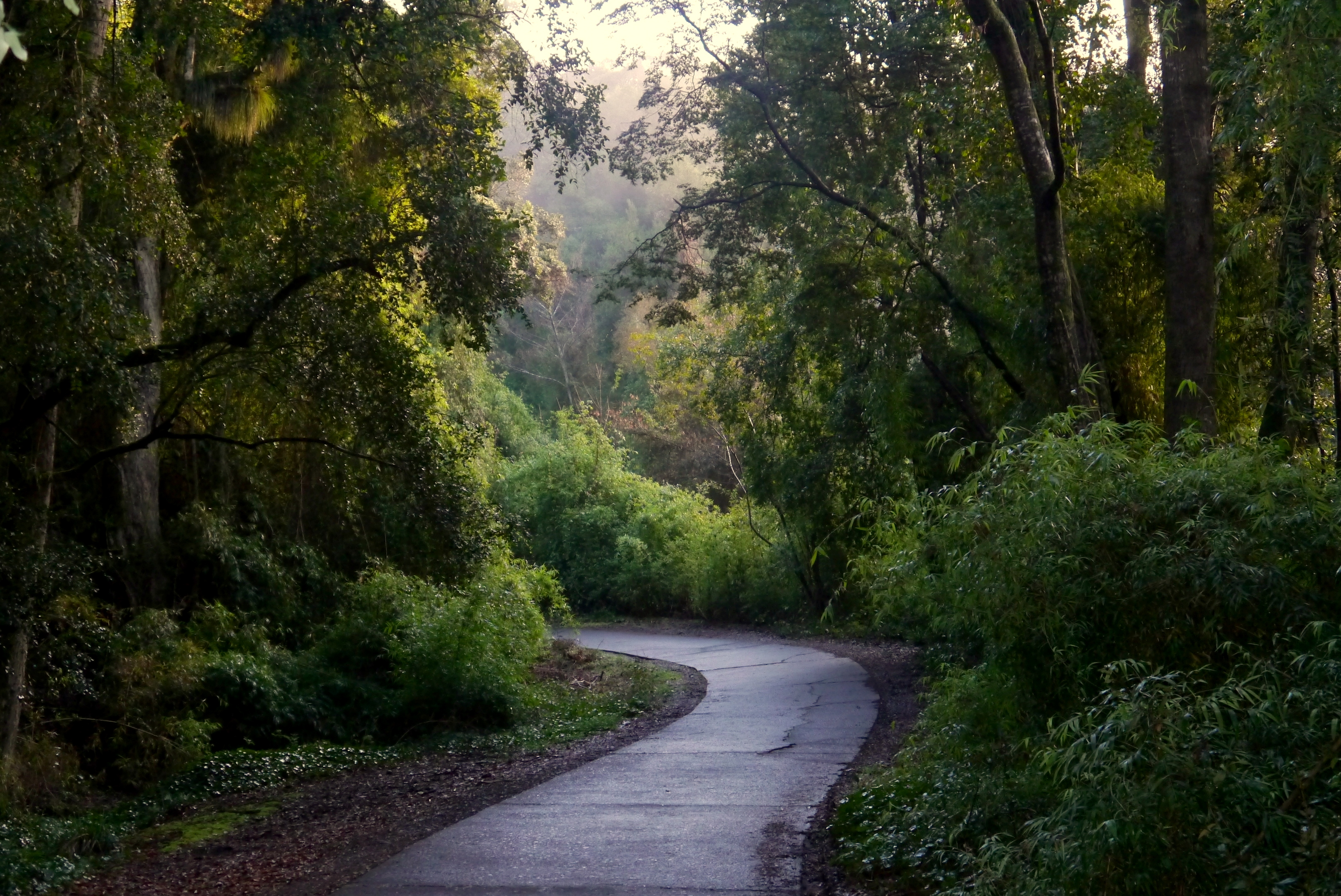
- Path in the Cerro Ñielol Natural Monument
- Interactive map of Cerro Ñielol Natural Monument
- Location: Temuco, Araucanía Region, Chile
- Coordinates: 38°43′41″S 72°32′34″W
- Area: 89 ha (220 acres)
- Governing body: Corporación Nacional Forestal (CONAF)

Cerro Ñielol Natural Monument is a hill belonging to the Intermediate Depression and is located in the urban area of the city of Temuco, Province of Cautín, Araucanía Region, Chile.

With a height of 115 and 335 m, the latter is the highest point of the city. On 89 acres a large variety of flora and fauna of the Valdivian temperate forest ecoregion can be seen, in particular butterflies, as well as birds.

There are important historical and cultural landmarks of Temuco. Its main entrance is along Avenida Arturo Prat (one of the main Temuco streets) and is seven blocks away from the main square Plaza de Armas. Because of its natural landscape and several viewpoints, the monument is one of the main tourist areas of the city. Cultural events are usually held at the top of the monument.

The Southern Andean Volcano Observatory is located at the hill, due to its good outlook on several volcanoes including Llaima volcano.

== Natural Monument ==
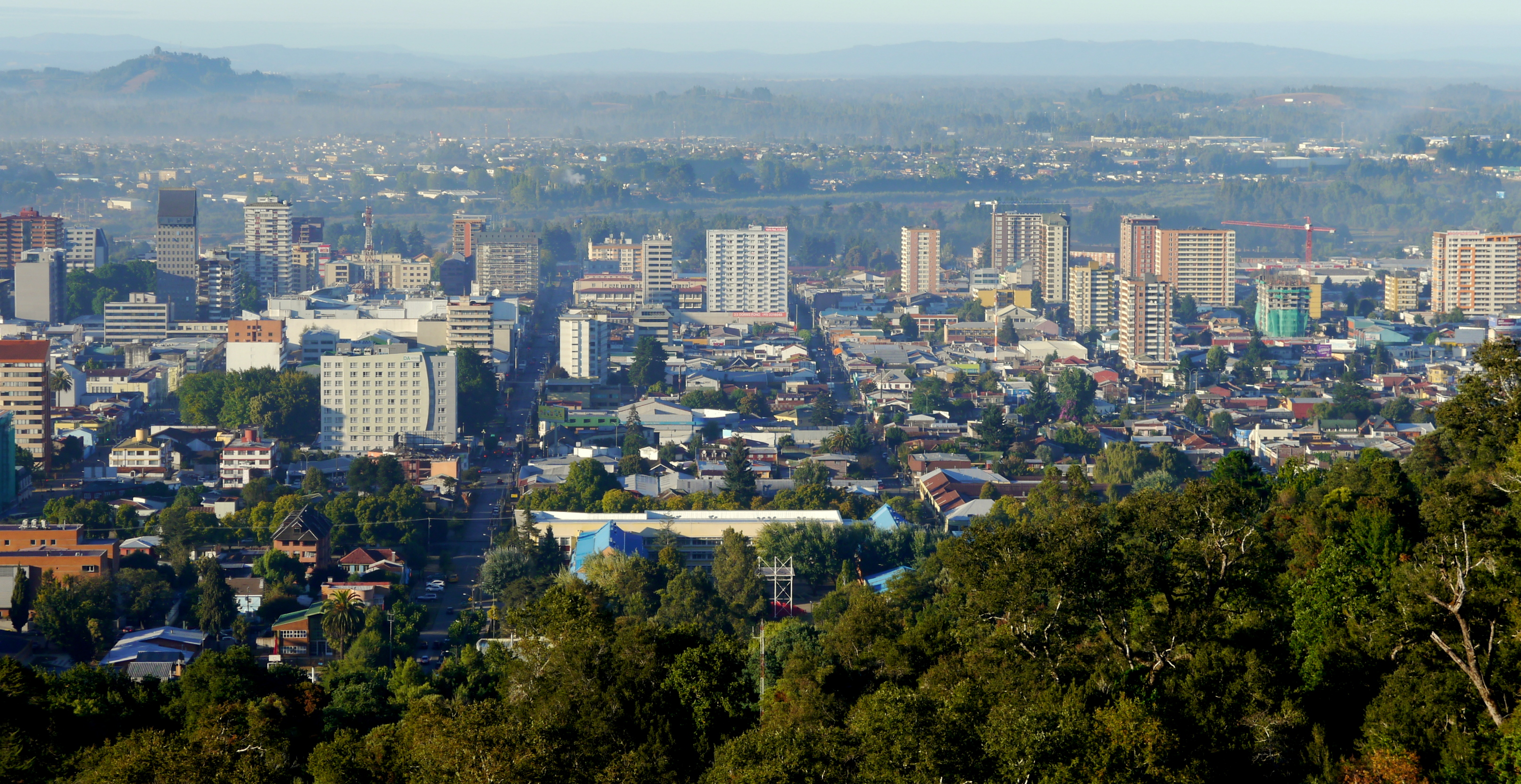
Temuco seen from Ñielol hill

The hill was originally named "National Tourism Park Cerro Ñielol". The Society of the Friends of the tree (founded by Luis Picasso Vallebuona) purchased the lands of the hill to reforest and protect it. Later it was reclassified as the National Park Natural Monument by Supreme Decree No. 617 of the Ministry of National Assets on December 3, 1987. Nowadays it is a protected area administrated by the Chilean state. It can be visited by car or foot all year round.

== See also ==
- 1987 in the environment
