= Simpson River National Reserve =

Simpson river National Reserve
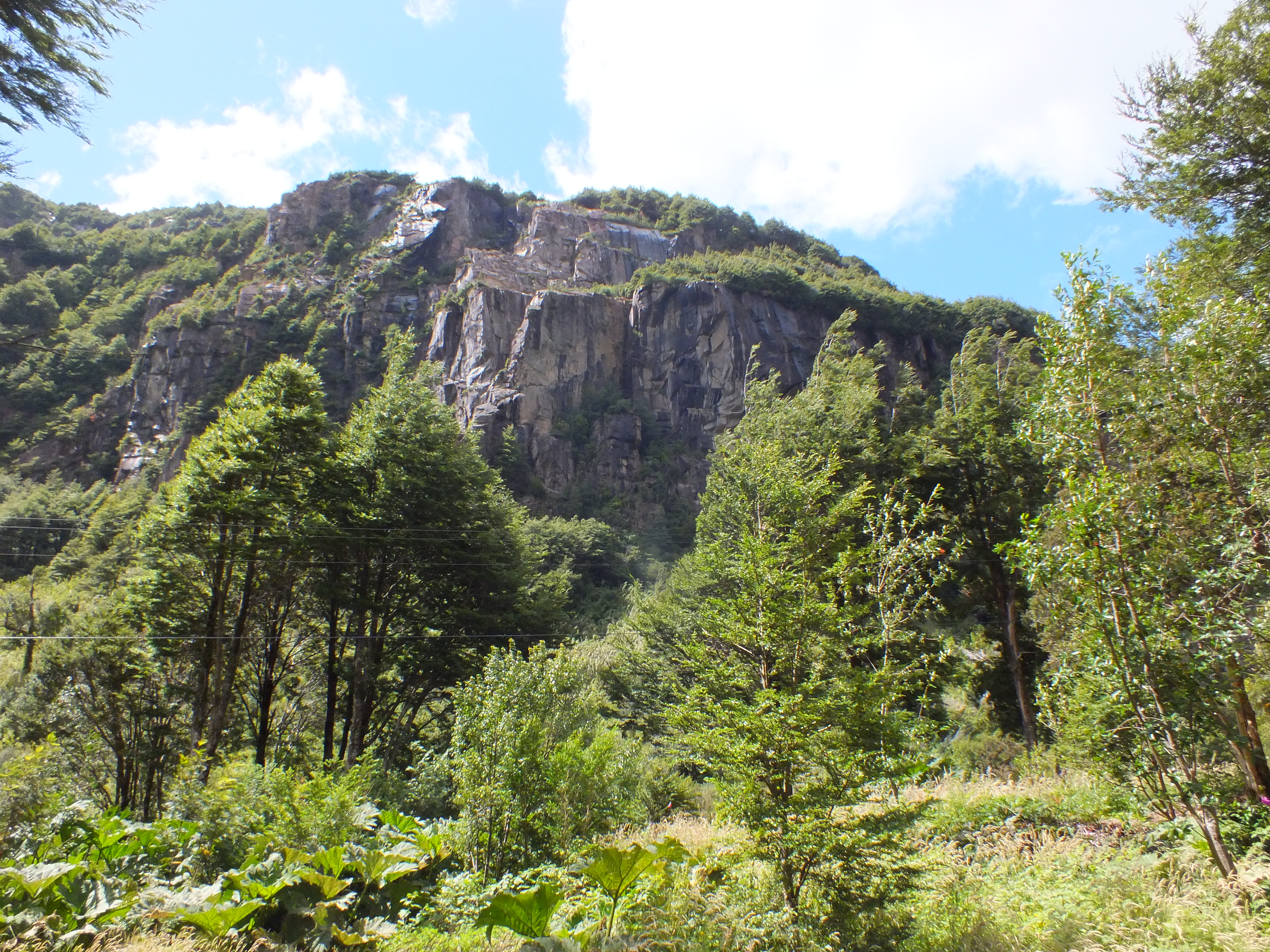
- Interactive map of Simpson river National Reserve
- Location: Aysén del General Carlos Ibáñez del Campo Region, Chile

Simpson river National Reserve is a national reserve of southern Chile's Aysén del General Carlos Ibáñez del Campo Region.

It is named after the Simpson River, a tributary of the Aysén River. It is one of the protected wild areas, administered by the National Forestry Corporation (CONAF). It preserves in its interior plant and animal species that must be protected to guarantee their existence in the future.
