= Lago Palena National Reserve =

- IUCN category IV (habitat/species management area)
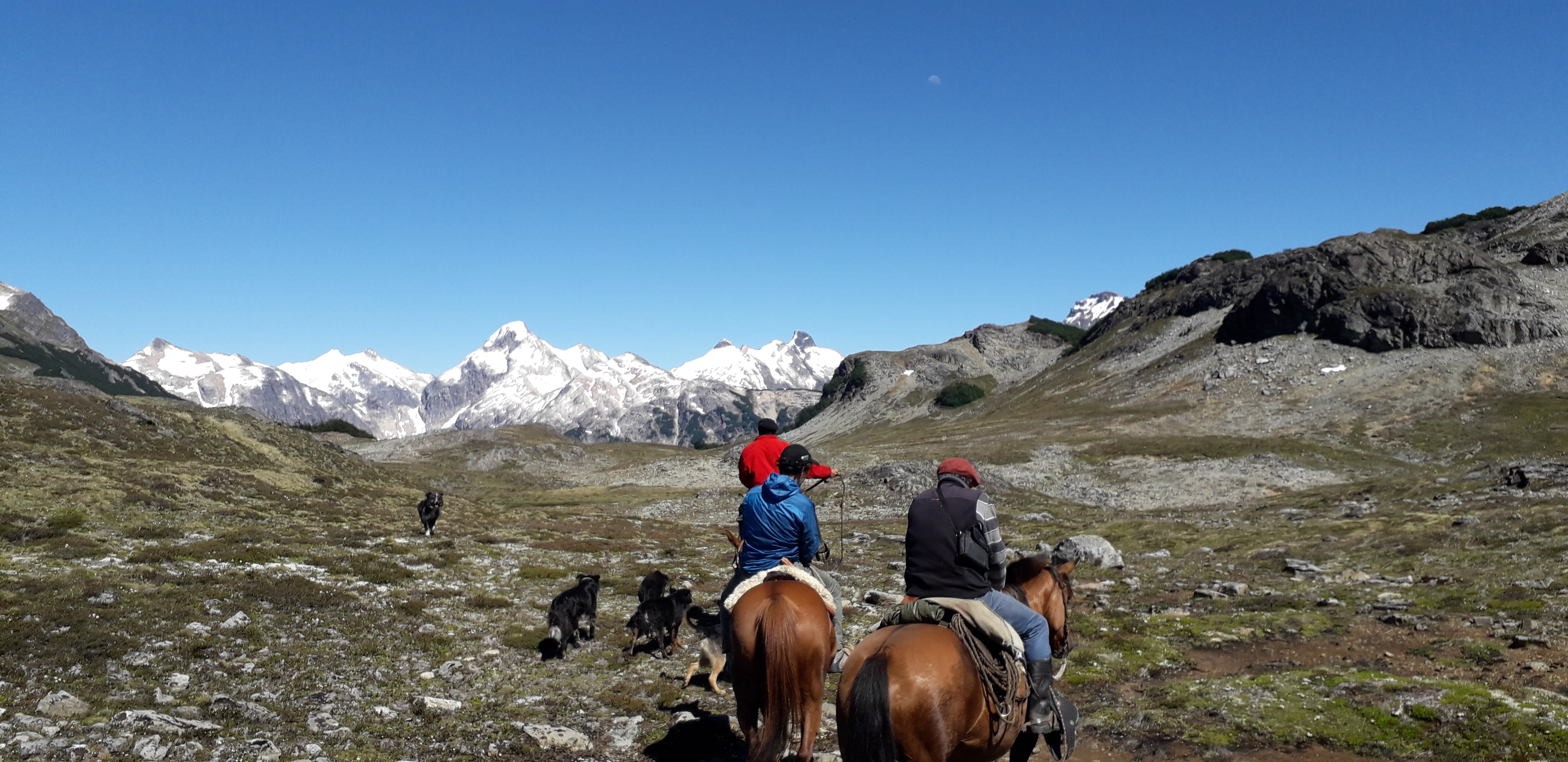
- Interactive map of Lago Palena National Reserve
- Location: Los Lagos Region, Chile
- Area: 493.91 km^{2} (190.70 sq mi)
- Designation: Forest reserve, national reserve
- Designated: 1965
- Governing body: Corporación Nacional Forestal (CONAF)

Lago Palena National Reserve is a national reserve in Los Lagos Region of Chile.
