= Laguna Torca National Reserve =

- IUCN category IV (habitat/species management area)
- Location within Chile
- Location: Maule Region, Chile
- Coordinates: 34°46′05″S 72°03′18″W
- Area: 6.04 km^{2} (2.33 sq mi)
- Established: 1985

Laguna Torca National Reserve is a national reserve of Chile's Maule Region. Laguna Torca is 200 kilometres (120 mi) South-West of Santiago, in the Maule Region 7. Situated a bare 3 kilometres (1.9 mi) from the Pacific Ocean and adjoins Lago Vichuquen, in the coastal mountains. The fresh water in the laguna comes from these local mountains, rather than the inland Andes.

The reserve is home to a variety of bird species. In January 2023 it was noticed by the National Forest Corporation that the reserve hosted a record of 50 black-necked swans.

== Geography ==
The Reserve is divided into three very different areas.

=== Main Lagoon ===
Where 120 species of birds, have been spotted, according to Head Ranger Don Luis. Black-necked swans (1600 at the last count including some ringed birds from Valdivia), fill the Laguna. The feeding swans add to the tranquility of the scene, and the main road runs through the side of the laguna giving a close up view of the Wildlife. Coscoroba swans, pimpollo (white-tufted grebe), tagua (coots), and many more, all can be seen in the lagoon.

Fish in the laguna such as the liza, tench, and carp. However you won't see any as there is a no fishing, swimming, boating policy in the park!

The reserve is a true sanctuary staffed by dedicated, knowledgeable, and very friendly Rangers. Viewing stations and a small reception centre is located at the Laguna. The main road cuts through one of the side arms of the lagoon and gives a great vantage point to see the many swans feeding.

=== Llico Forest ===
The second section of the National Reserve is Llico forest, (Bosque de Llico) an area which was forested with exotic species. This area is accessed through a long wooden bridge in the middle of Llico, and is a couple of kilometers from the Laguna. The sheer size of these old trees is something that is seen very rarely in this area with the modern forestry industry geared up for quick growth and replanting. Walking through the park under the shade of these giants gives a glimpse of the older times. The trees were originally planted to stop the inland march of the sand dunes from the beach at Llico playa.

=== Cerrillos Island ===
The third area of the National Reserve is Cerrillos Island, and is to be found 7 kilometres (4.3 mi) south of the main reserve, in the southern section of Vichuquén Lake (es). The island is uninhabited, with a forested area of 2 hectares (4.9 acres).
