= Lago Las Torres National Reserve =

- IUCN category IV (habitat/species management area)
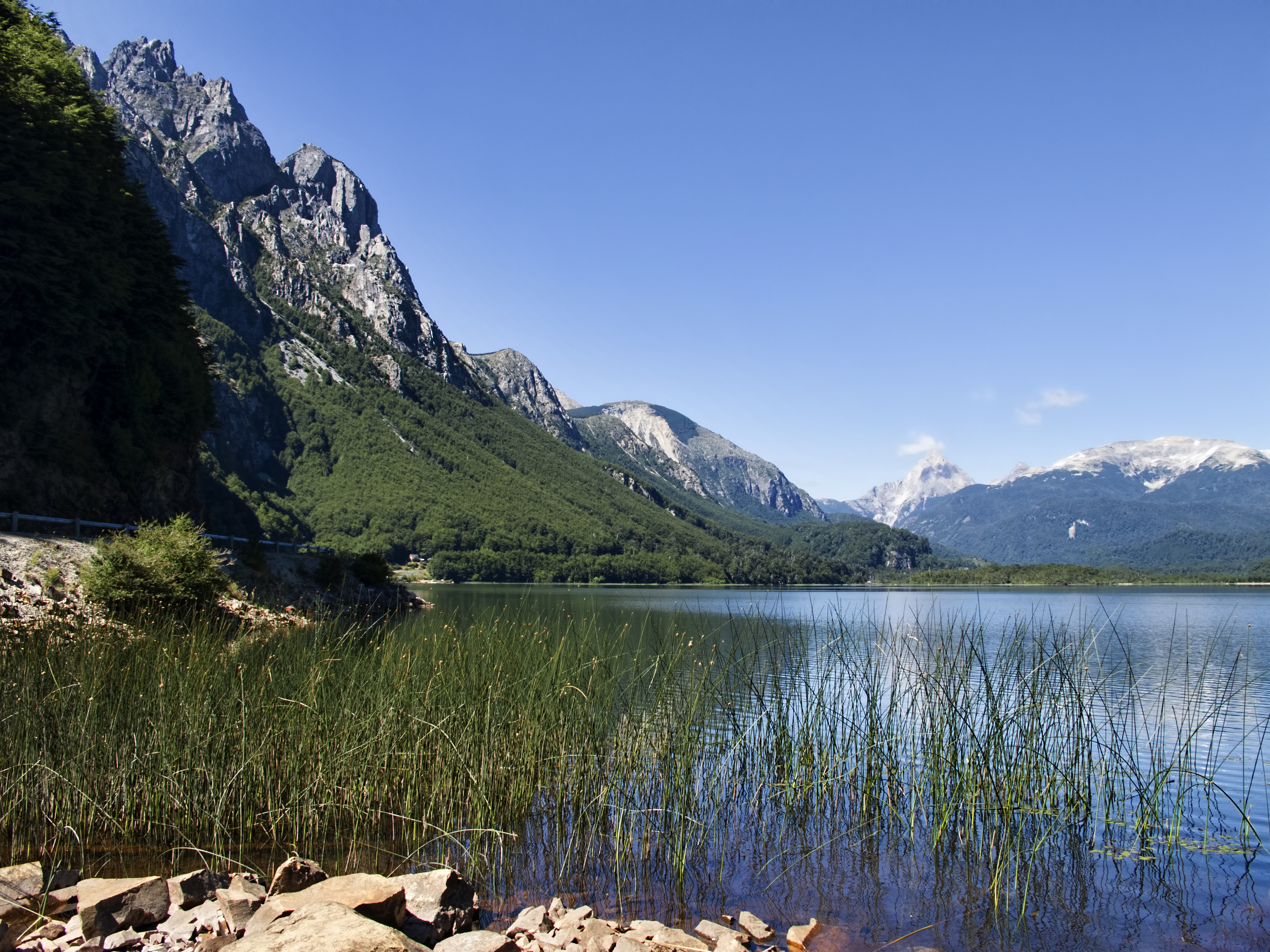
- Las Torres Lake
- Interactive map of Lago Las Torres National Reserve
- Location: Chile
- Coordinates: 44°48′S 72°12′W
- Area: 165.16 km^{2}
- Designation: National reserve
- Designated: 1982
- Governing body: Corporación Nacional Forestal (CONAF)

Lago Las Torres National Reserve is a national nature reserve of southern Chile's Aysén del General Carlos Ibáñez del Campo Region. The reserve is marginally traversed by the Carretera Austral, which borders the eastern shore of Las Torres Lake. The reserve is named for that lake, but it is not contained within the reserve's boundaries. It is located 125 km north of Coyhaique and is bordered by Argentina to the east. Cisnes River approximately marks its northern border.

This protected area was established in 1969 as a national park. This designation was changed in 1982 to a national reserve.
