= Federico Albert National Reserve =

National Reserve in Maule Region, Chile

- IUCN category IV (habitat/species management area)
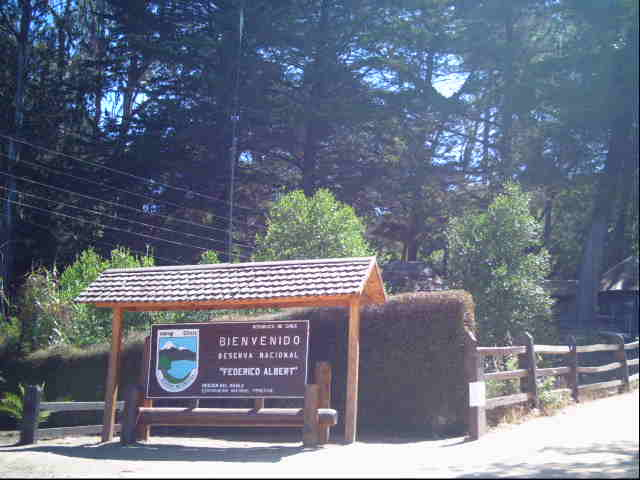
- Access to the reserve

- Location within Chile
- Location: Cauquenes Province, Chile
- Nearest city: Chanco
- Coordinates: 35.7331°S 72.5391°W
- Area: 1.45 km^{2} (0.56 mi^{2})
- Established: 1981
- Governing body: National Forestal Corporation (CONAF)

Federico Albert National Reserve is a 1.45 km^{2} (0.56 mi^{2}) national reserve of Cauquenes Province, Chile, located near Chanco town.

This reserve consists in a plantation of trees as pines, eucalyptus, firs and many others, directed by the naturalist Frederich Albert Taupp (known in Spanish as Federico Albert), which made this for saving the town of Chanco of the dunes that growing along the coast.
