= El Yali National Reserve =

Nature reserve in Chile

- IUCN category IV (habitat/species management area)
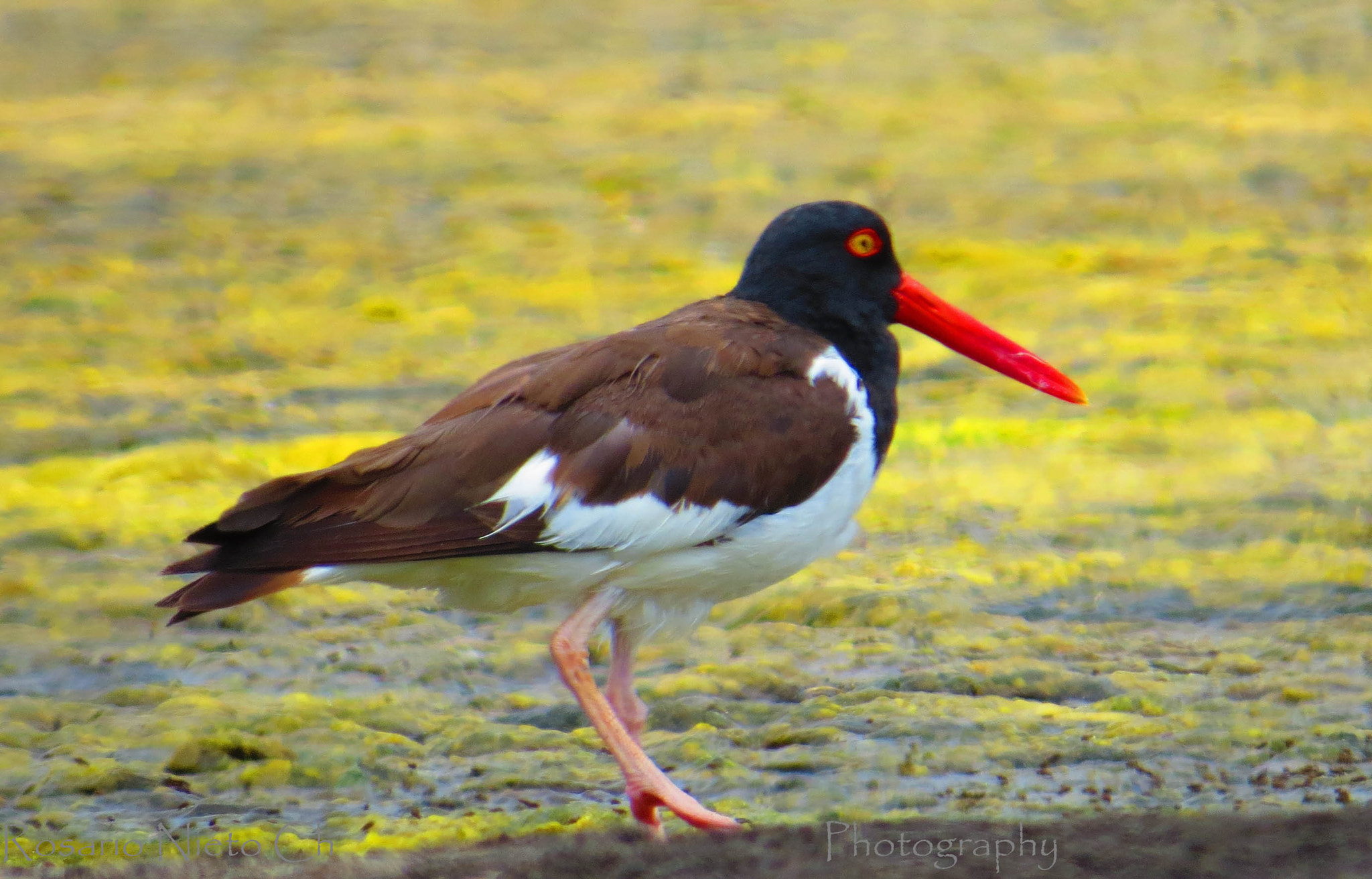
- American oystercatcher (Haematopus palliatus) at El Yali National Reserve
- Interactive map of El Yali National Reserve
- Coordinates: 33.7333°S 71.6500°W
- Area: 5.2 km^{2} (2.0 sq mi)
- Designation: National reserve
- Designated: 1996
- Governing body: Corporación Nacional Forestal (CONAF)

Ramsar Wetland
- Official name: Humedal el Yali
- Designated: 2 December 1996
- Reference no.: 878

El Yali National Reserve is a nature reserve of Chile located in the southern portion of the Valparaíso Region. This coastal wetland is a Ramsar site and covers an area of 5.2 km^{2}.

El Yali has been considered an important nesting site for various species of birds in central Chile and a place of protection, rest and feeding for migratory species, which has made it the area with the highest concentration of avifauna in central Chile, with more than 115 species, including: the coscoroba swan, black-necked swan, Chilean flamingo, Franklin's gull and Cahuil gull, various types of ducks, the cuckoo heron and small birds, among others.
