= La Chimba National Reserve =

Protected area of the Antofagasta Region, Chile

- IUCN category IV (habitat/species management area)
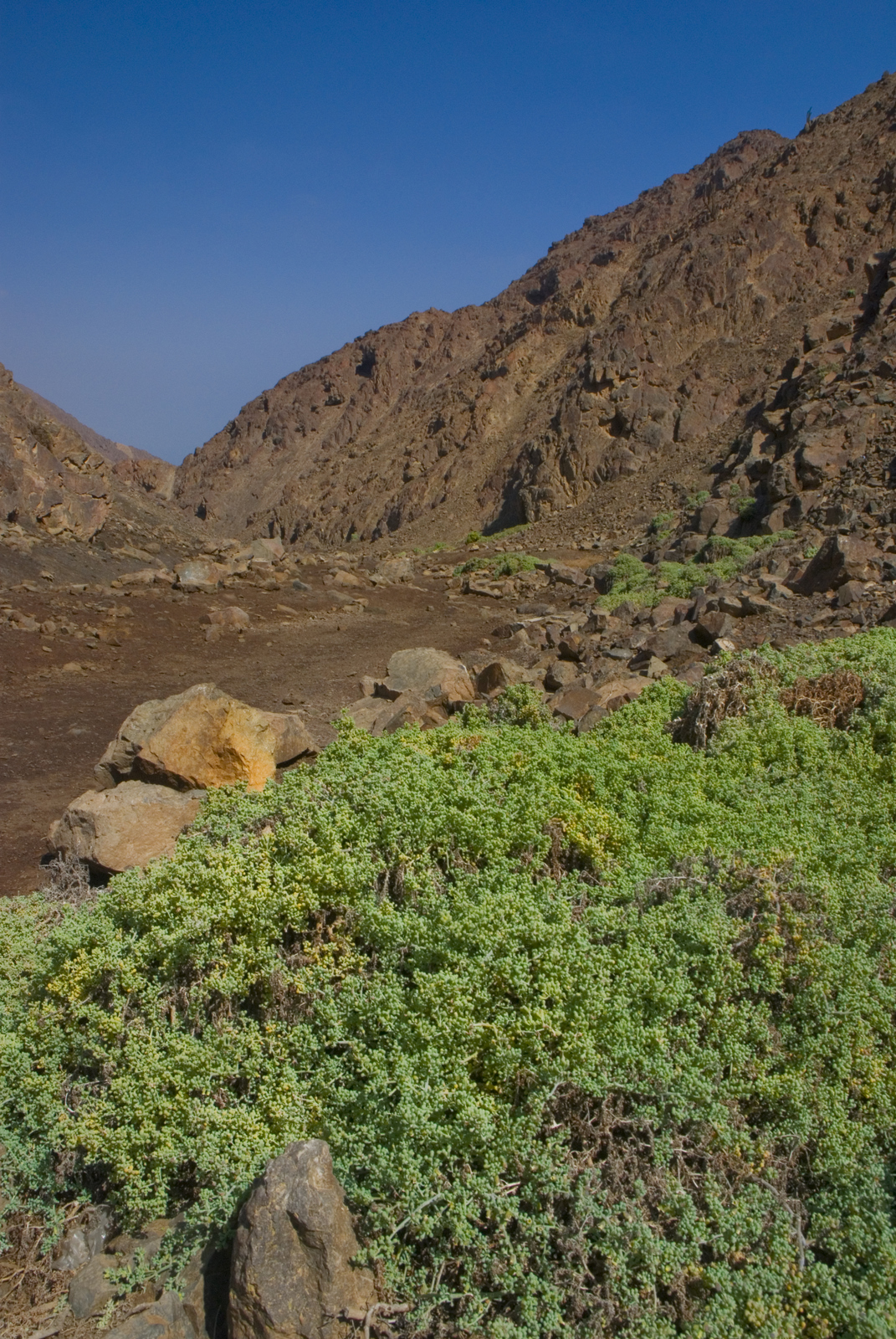
- Interactive map of La Chimba National Reserve
- Location: Antofagasta Region, Chile
- Coordinates: 23°32′17″S 70°21′06″W
- Area: 25.83 km^{2} (9.97 sq mi)
- Designation: National reserve
- Designated: 1988
- Governing body: National reserves of Chile

La Chimba National Reserve is a national reserve in Antofagasta Region of northern Chile.

== See also ==
- List of the protected areas of Chile
- Protected areas of Antofagasta Region
- Atacama Desert
