= Ralco National Reserve =

National reserve

- IUCN category IV (habitat/species management area)
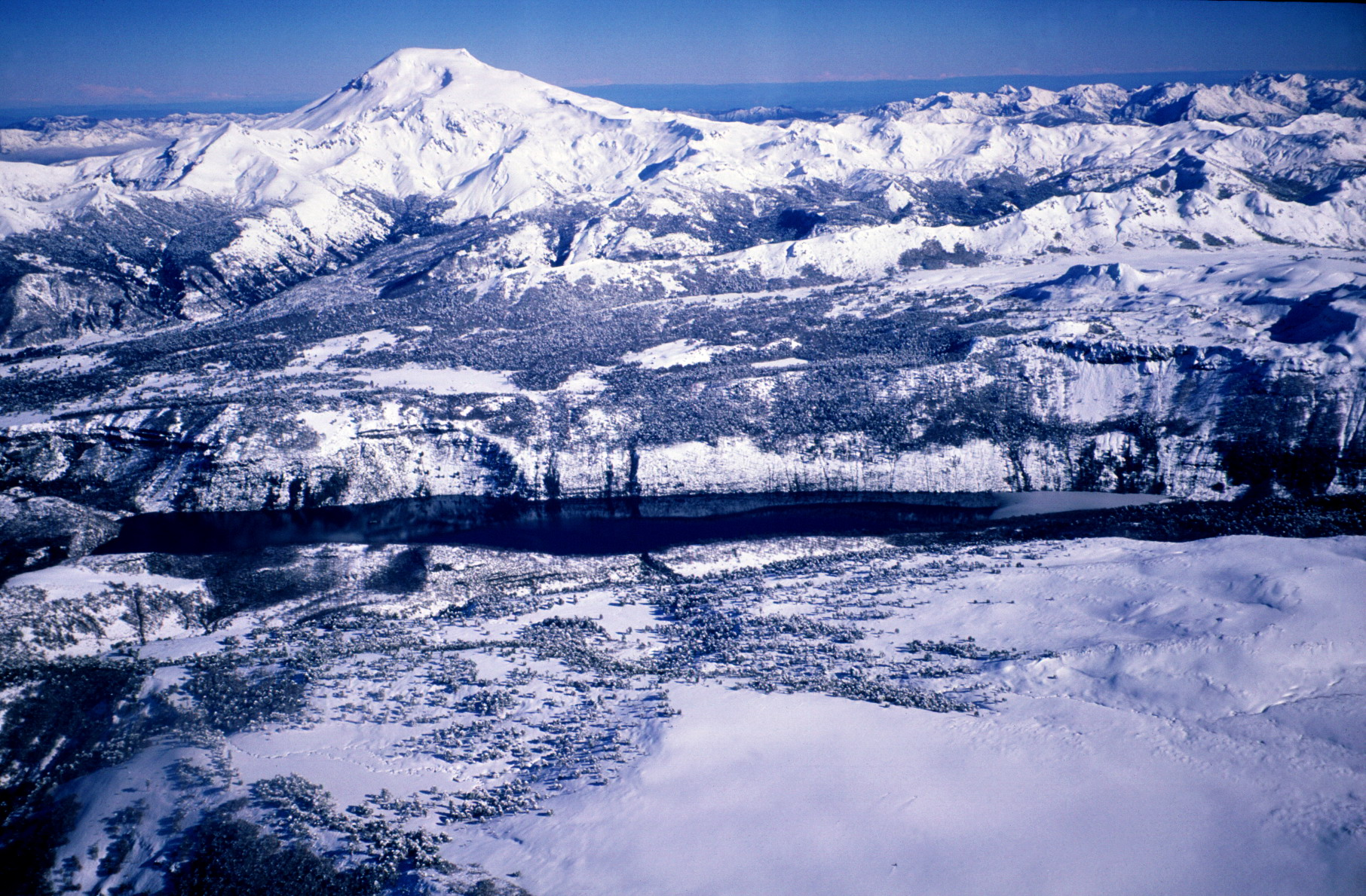
- Callaqui in the distance.
- Interactive map of Ralco National Reserve
- Location: Biobío Region, Chile
- Coordinates: 37°51′S 71°19′W
- Area: 124.21 km^{2} (47.96 sq mi)
- Designation: National reserve
- Designated: 1988
- Governing body: Corporación Nacional Forestal (CONAF)

Ralco National Reserve is a national reserve in Biobío Region of Chile. The dominant feature of the reserve is Callaqui volcano. Pehuenche communities have ancestrally used the reserve's lands for ceremonial activities, grazing their animals and collecting pine nuts (fruit of the araucaria tree).
