= China Muerta National Reserve =

National reserve in La Araucanía Region, Chile

- IUCN category IV (habitat/species management area)
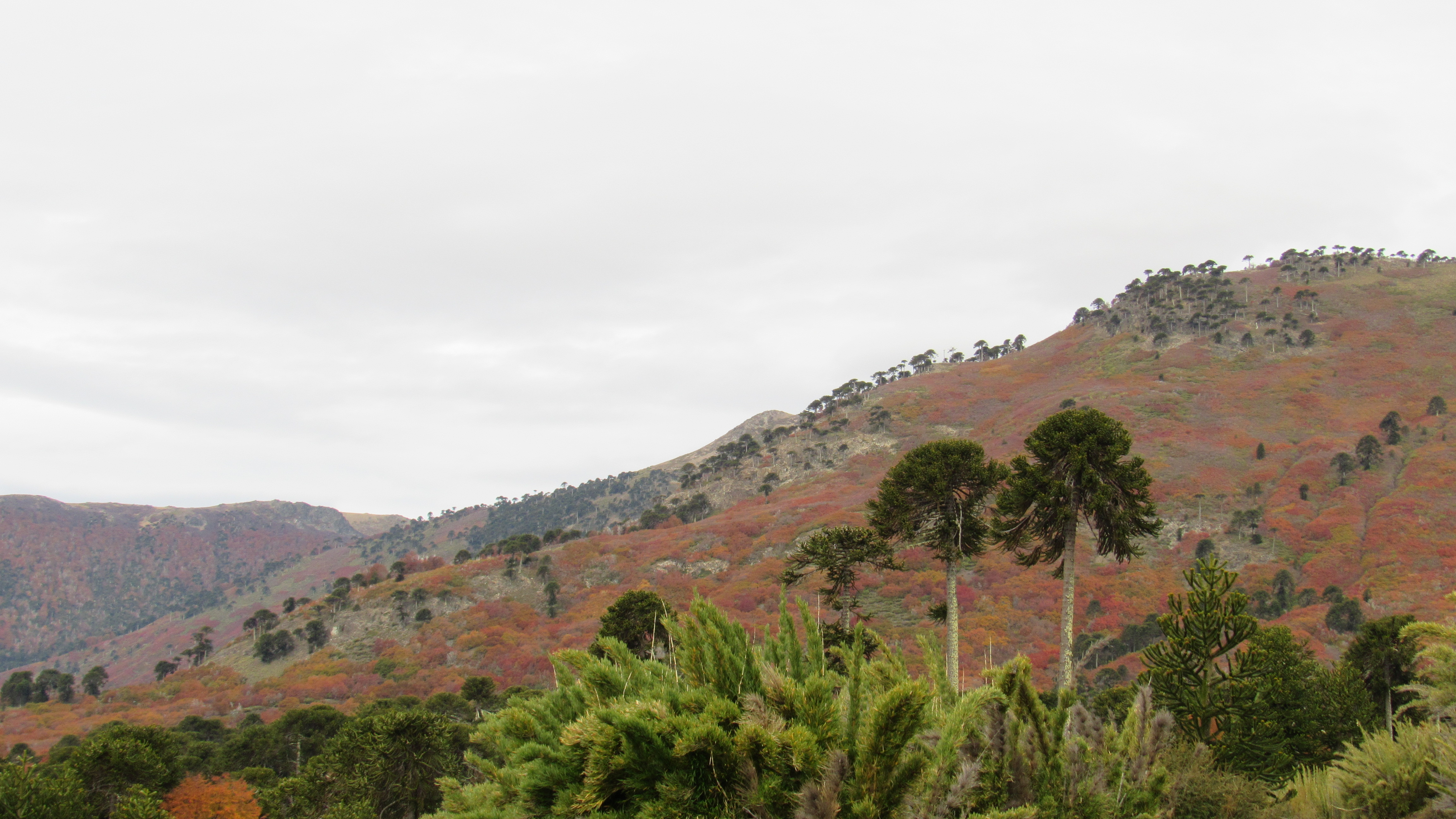
- Interactive map of China Muerta National Reserve
- Location: La Araucanía Region, Chile
- Coordinates: 38.7000°S 71.4333°W
- Area: 98.87 km^{2} (38.17 sq mi)
- Designation: National reserve, forest reserve
- Designated: 1968
- Governing body: Corporación Nacional Forestal (CONAF)

China Muerta National Reserve is a national reserve in La Araucanía Region of Chile. It was created on June 28, 1968, by Supreme Decree No. 330 of the Ministry of Agriculture.
