= Mocho-Choshuenco National Reserve =

- IUCN category IV (habitat/species management area)
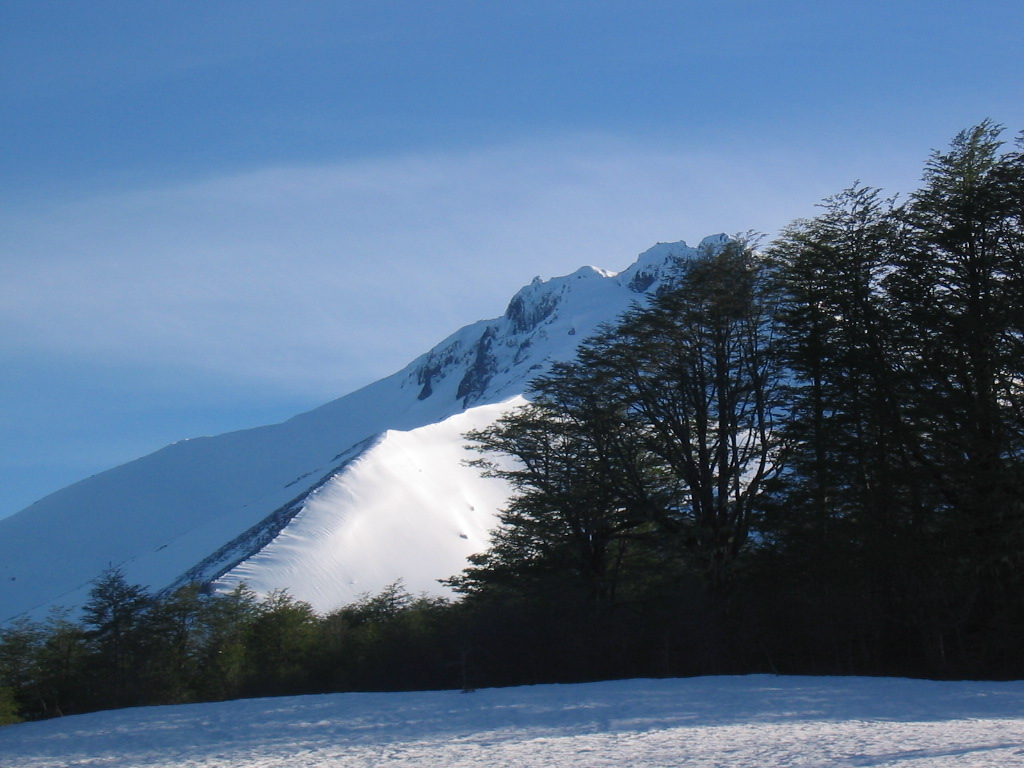
- A view of the Choshuenco volcano in early November from the former ski pistes

- Location within Chile
- Location: Los Ríos Region, Chile
- Nearest city: Panguipulli
- Coordinates: 39°55′52″S 72°03′40″W
- Area: 7,537 ha (18,620 acres)
- Established: 1994
- Governing body: Corporación Nacional Forestal

The Mocho-Choshuenco National Reserve (Pronounced: /ˌmɒtʃoʊ tʃɒʃˈwɛnkoʊ/ MOTCH-oh chosh-WEN-koh) is a natural reserve around the Mocho-Choshuenco volcano, in Los Ríos Region, southern Chile. The reserve was created by decree in March 1994 and covers 7,537 ha (18,620 acres) distributed in Panguipulli, Los Lagos and Futrono municipality. The principal access goes from the Pan American Highway to Enco passing by Panguipulli and Choshuenco. From Enco a small way goes to the refuge area, during the summer months tracked vehicles can go there.

Mocho-Choshuenco National Reserve has no park guards or any public infrastructure. In the refuge sector there is a mountain hut leased to Los Lagos municipality, some old military buildings ruins, and the rests of a small ski centre.

== Gallery ==
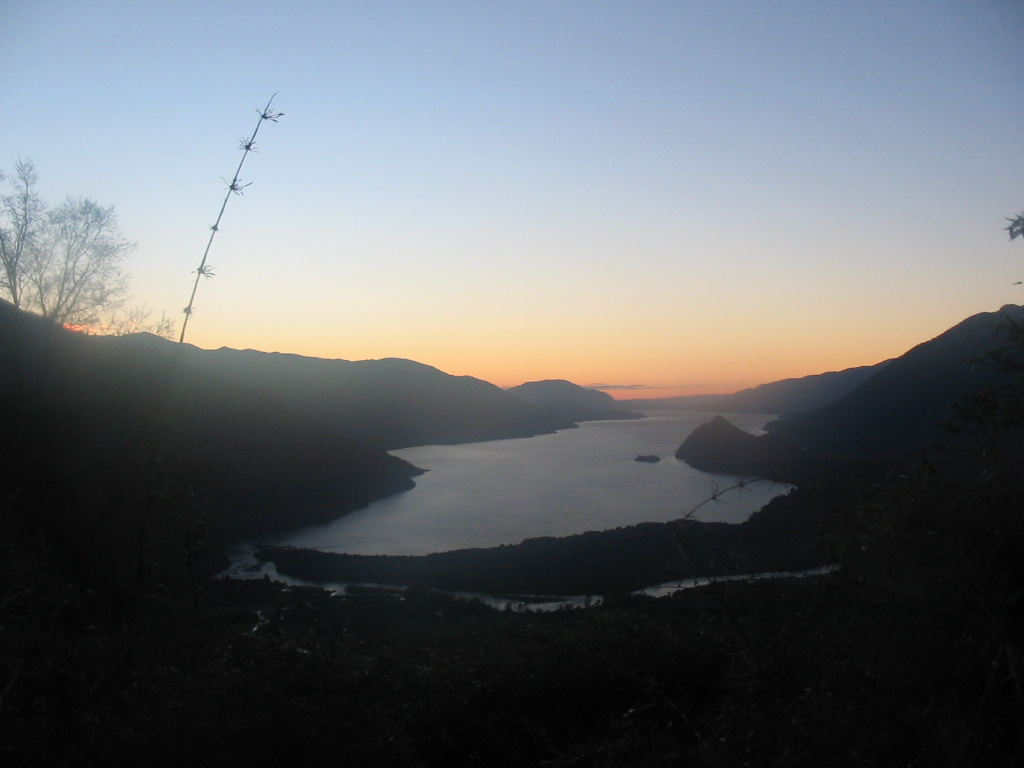
Sunset on Riñihue Lake, view from Mocho-Choshuenco

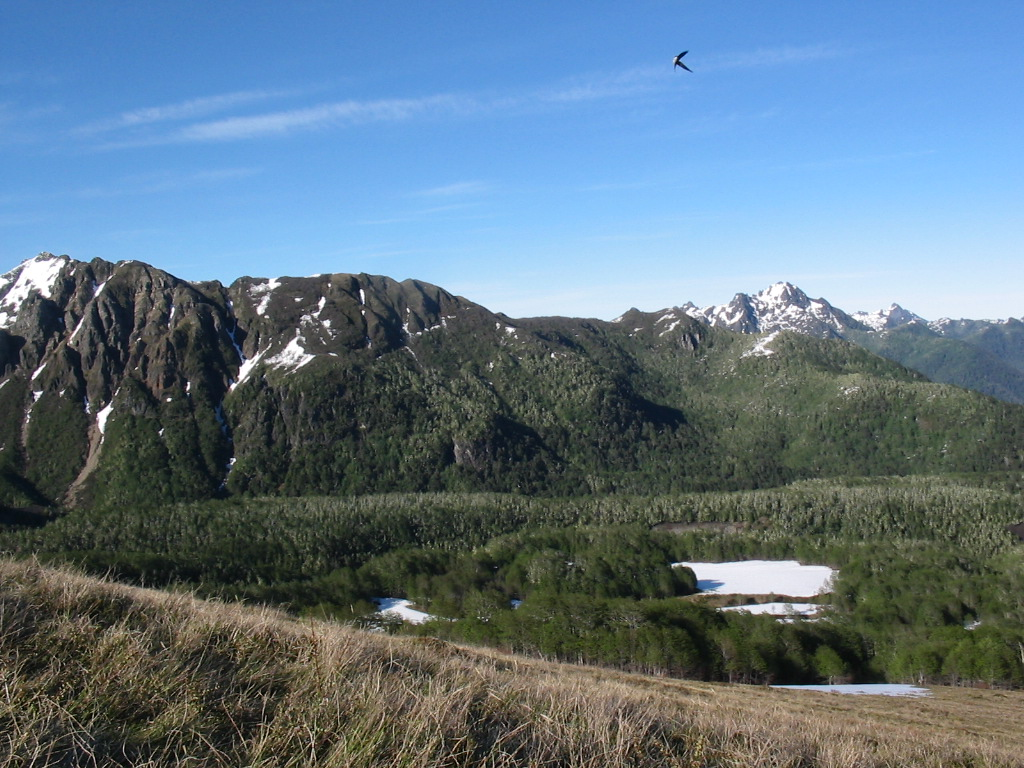
Río Blanco Valley. Río Blanco river drains the west side of Mocho-Choshuenco to the Enco River.
