= Francisco Coloane Marine and Coastal Protected Area =

- IUCN category IV (habitat/species management area)
- Interactive map of Francisco Coloane Marine and Coastal Protected Area
- Location: Magallanes Region, Chile
- Coordinates: 53.8333°S 71.8000°W
- Area: 653.27 km^{2} (252.23 sq mi)
- Designation: Marine and coastal protected area
- Designated: 2004
- Governing body: Comisión Regional de Area Marine Costera Protegida (CRAMCP) and Servicio Nacional de Pesca (SERNAPESCA)

Francisco Coloane Marine and Coastal Protected Area (Spanish: Parque Marino Francisco Coloane) is a protected area in southern Chile's Magallanes and Antártica Chilena Region.

It is Chile's first marine park. It is located in the Punta Arenas province in the Magallanes Region of the Chilean Antarctic. It is south of the island Isla Carlos III, and between the islands of Santa Inés, Riesco, and the New Brunswick peninsula.

Its name pays homage to Francisco Coloane, a Chilean writer whose works took place in the area.

The protected area has great biodiversity in part due to the border between the Pacific and Atlantic oceans, its strong winds, the presence of massive glaciers, and the extensive coastline.

== Wildlife ==
The park was created to preserve the feeding areas of Humpback whales, Magellanic penguins, and South American sea lions. It is also habitat to other cetaceans, such as orcas, sei whales, Antarctic minke whales, fin whales, and southern right whales. Furthermore, it is also home to marine mammals such as the South American fur seal, Southern river otter, and coypu, which are semiaquatic.

Among its abundant variety of marine birds are the black-browed albatross, Chilean skua, imperial cormorant, and South American tern. Other often sighted coastal species include kelp goose, Fuegian steamer duck, kingfisher, and dark-bellied cinclodes.

== Access Routes ==
The park is accessible by sea routes from Punta Carrera or Bahia Mansa in Punta Arenas or other ports. Travel by land from Punta Arenas is not possible.
