= Coyhaique National Reserve =

National reserve in Chile

- IUCN category IV (habitat/species management area)
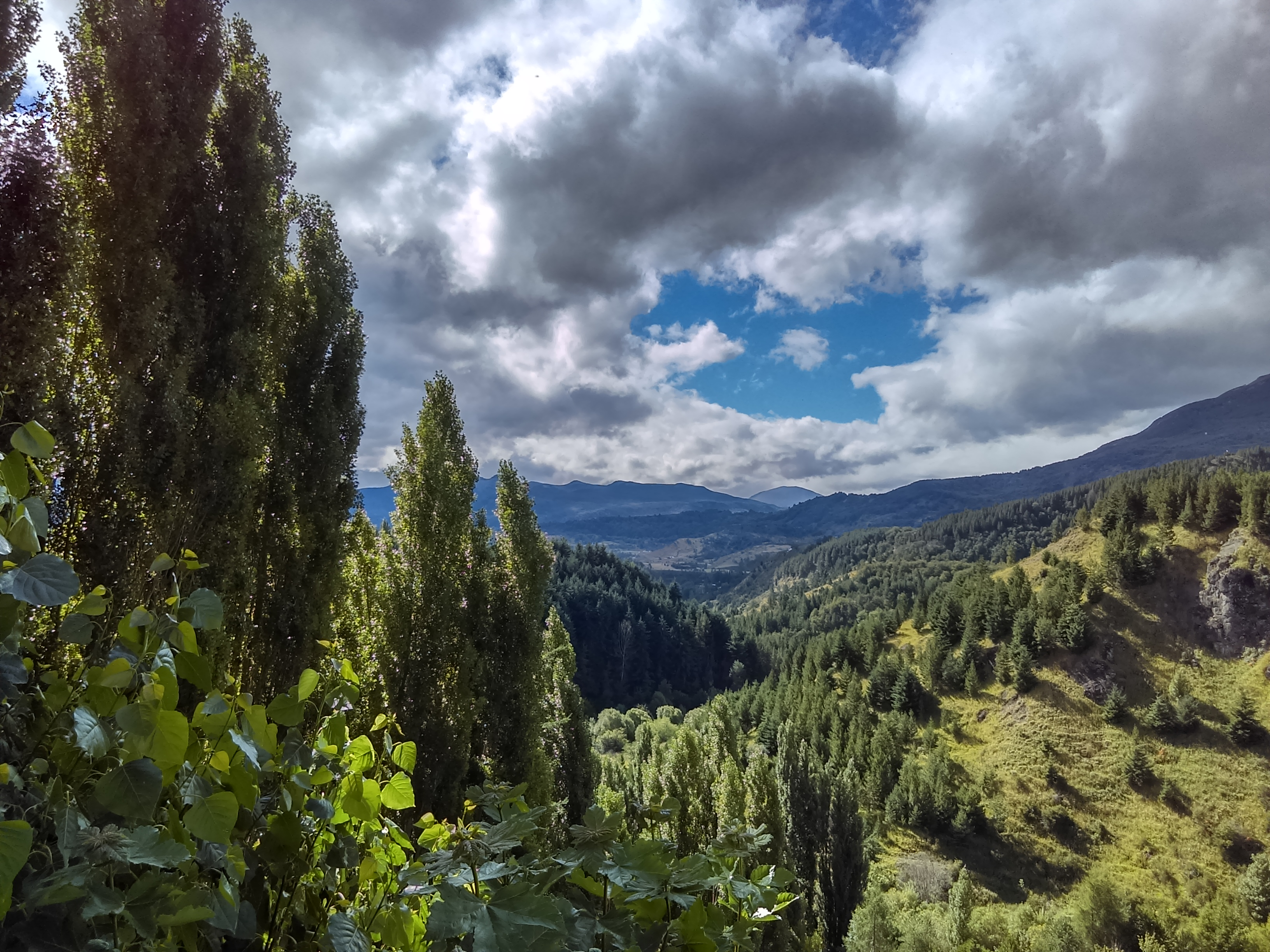

- Location within Chile
- Location: Aysén del General Carlos Ibáñez del Campo Region, Chile
- Coordinates: 45°30′40″S 71°59′45″W
- Area: 21.5 km^{2} (8.3 sq mi)
- Designation: National reserve, forest reserve
- Designated: 1948
- Governing body: Corporación Nacional Forestal (CONAF)

Coyhaique National Reserve (Spanish: [kojˈajke]) is a national reserve of southern Chile's Aysén del General Carlos Ibáñez del Campo Region.
