= Meullín-Puye Nature Sanctuary =

- Interactive map of Meullín-Puye Nature Sanctuary
- Location: Aysén Region, Chile
- Coordinates: 45.20°S 72.98°W
- Area: 295.42 km^{2} (114.06 sq mi)
- Designation: Nature sanctuary
- Designated: 2022
- Administrator: Fundación Kreen

Meullín-Puye Nature Sanctuary is a protected area in Aysén Region of southern Chile. The sanctuary is in the basin of the Cuervo River, and protects an expanse of primary Valdivian temperate rain forest, along with lakes, wetlands and grasslands. It is managed by the Fundación Kreen (Kreen Foundation).

== Flora and fauna ==
65% of the sanctuary is forested, principally with old-growth primary forest. There is no evidence of logging, human-caused fires, or introduced salmonids in the sanctuary. Trees include Magellan's beech (Nothofagus betuloides), lenga beech (Nothofagus pumilio), Chiloé's coigue (Nothofagus nitida), tepa (Laureliopsis philippiana), Guaitecas cypress (Pilgerodendron uviferum), ñirre (Nothofagus antarctica), winter's bark (Drimys winteri), tineo (Weinmannia trichosperma), and mañío de hojas punzantes (Podocarpus nubigenus).

The sanctuary also protects areas of Andean temperate deciduous scrub. The predominant shrub is ñirre (Nothofagus antarctica), and the sanctuary is home to 13% of Chile's population of the species.

77 species of birds, 11 amphibians, and 21 mammals are native to the sanctuary. These include the Magellanic woodpecker (Campephilus magellanicus), Magellanic snipe (Gallinago magellanica), peregrine falcon (Falco peregrinus), southern pudú (Pudu puda), southern river otter (Lontra provocax), and Darwin's frog (Rhinoderma darwinii). The native fish puye grande (Galaxias platei) inhabits the rivers and streams of the sanctuary.
