= Trapananda National Reserve =

- IUCN category IV (habitat/species management area)
- Location: Aysén Region, Chile
- Area: 23.05 km^{2} (8.90 sq mi)
- Designation: National reserve
- Designated: 1992
- Governing body: Corporación Nacional Forestal (CONAF)

Trapananda National Reserve is a national reserve of southern Chile's Aysén del General Carlos Ibáñez del Campo Region.
