= Futaleufú National Reserve =

- IUCN category IV (habitat/species management area)
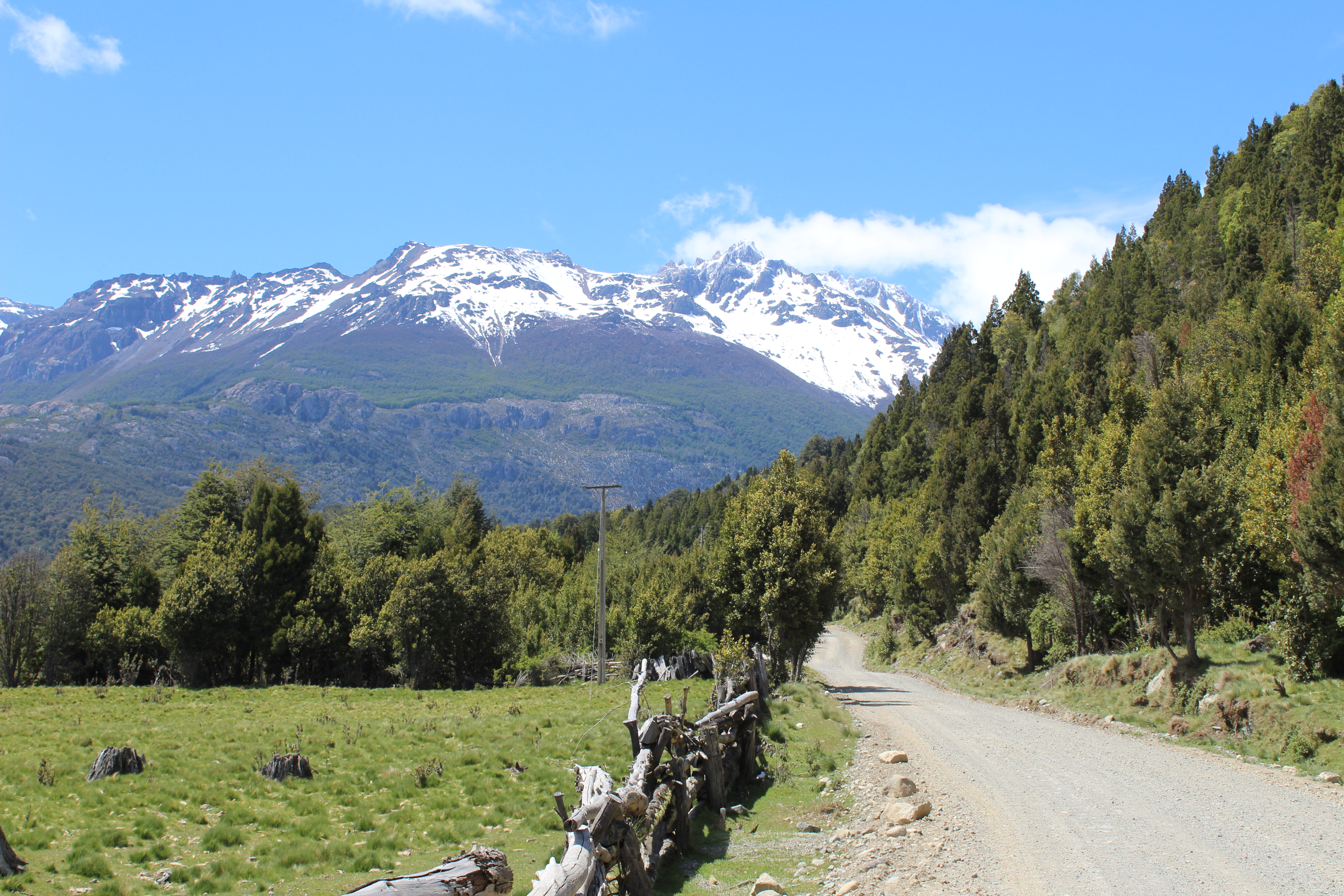
- Interactive map of Futaleufú National Reserve
- Location: Los Lagos Region, Chile
- Nearest city: Futaleufú
- Coordinates: 43°17′S 71°48′W
- Area: 120.65 km^{2}
- Established: 1998
- Governing body: Corporación Nacional Forestal (CONAF)

Futaleufú National Reserve is a national reserve in the Northern Patagonia section of southern Chile. The park is administered by the CONAF (Chilean National Park Service). The Futaleufu National Reserve is located in Palena Province of Los Lagos Region of Chile, southeast of the Futaleufú River and the town of Futaleufu. The southern and eastern boundaries of the reserve are defined by the international border with Argentina. The park includes the headwaters of the Chico River, a scenic tributary of the more famous Futaleufu, and several waterfalls appear inside the park that can be accessed by hiking trails. The reserve also contains the most southern occurrence of Austrocedrus chilensis and is home to some South Andean deer.
