= National Forest Corporation =

Chilean non-profit agency

- Corporacion Nacional Forestal
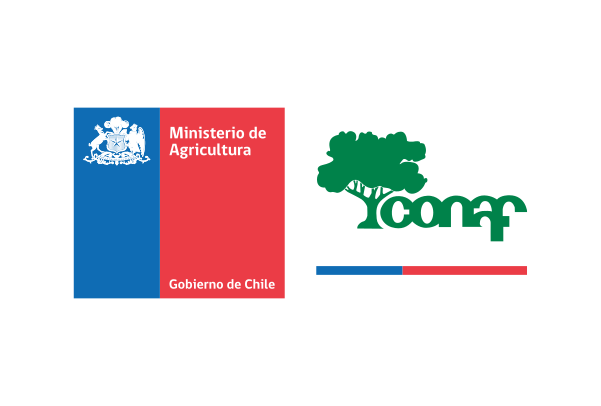
- Logo of the Ministry of Agriculture (left) and logo of the National Forest Corporation (right)

Environmental overview
- Formed: 1970
- Preceding Environmental: "Reforestation Corporation" or COREF (Corporación de Reforestación')
- Superseding Environmental: Ministry of Agriculture
- Type: Environmental
- Jurisdiction: National
- Headquarters: Santiago
- Motto: CONAF, for a sustainably forested Chile ("CONAF, por un Chile Forestal Sustentable")
- Employees: more than 1900
- Website: CONAF official website

The National Forest Corporation (Spanish: Corporación Nacional Forestal, CONAF) is a Chilean State-owned private non-profit organization, through which the Chilean state contributes to the development and sustainable management of the country's forest resources. CONAF is overseen and funded by the Ministry of Agriculture of Chile.

It administers the forest policies of Chile and promotes the development of the sector with sustainable forest management.

CONAF is also the governing body of all the national parks of Chile, including those without forests or major vegetation, such as Llullaillaco National Park and others in the Atacama Desert.

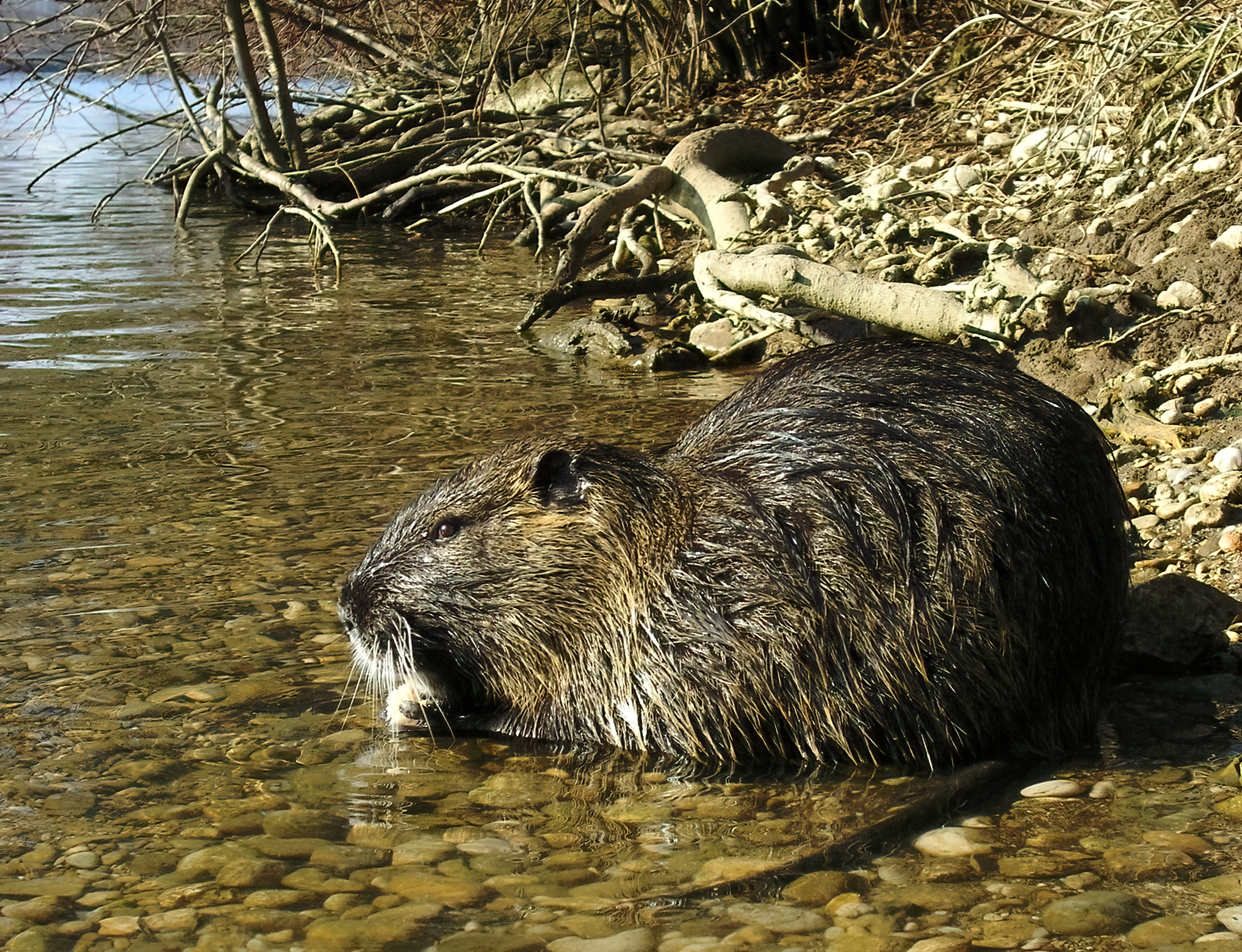
A Coypu, the CONAF mascot

== History ==
CONAF was created on 13 May 1970, as the "Reforestation Corporation" or COREF (Corporación de Reforestación'). In 1972 it acquired its current powers, structure and name. In 1976 it adopted Forestín, a coypu, as its mascot.

In 1984, under Chilean law Nº 18,348, a move was made to modify the private corporation status of CONAF and make it a government agency. In October 2012 the Chilean senate considered and rejected a proposal to convert CONAF's legal nature from that of a "private corporation" to that of a public (government) agency. The rejected proposal would have created a National Forest Service (Servicio Nacional Forestal). During the legislative proceedings, testimony was made that addressed the "anomalous" nature of a private corporation performing functions that should be performed by a wholly government agency or agencies. However, as of November 2014, such a status change has not taken place.

== Mission and goals ==
CONAF's mission is to contribute to Chile's development through the sustainable use of forest ecosystems, the mitigation of the climate change, the promotion and enforcement of forestry and environmental laws, protect natural resources, and administrate the wildlife areas protected by the government for the generations to come.

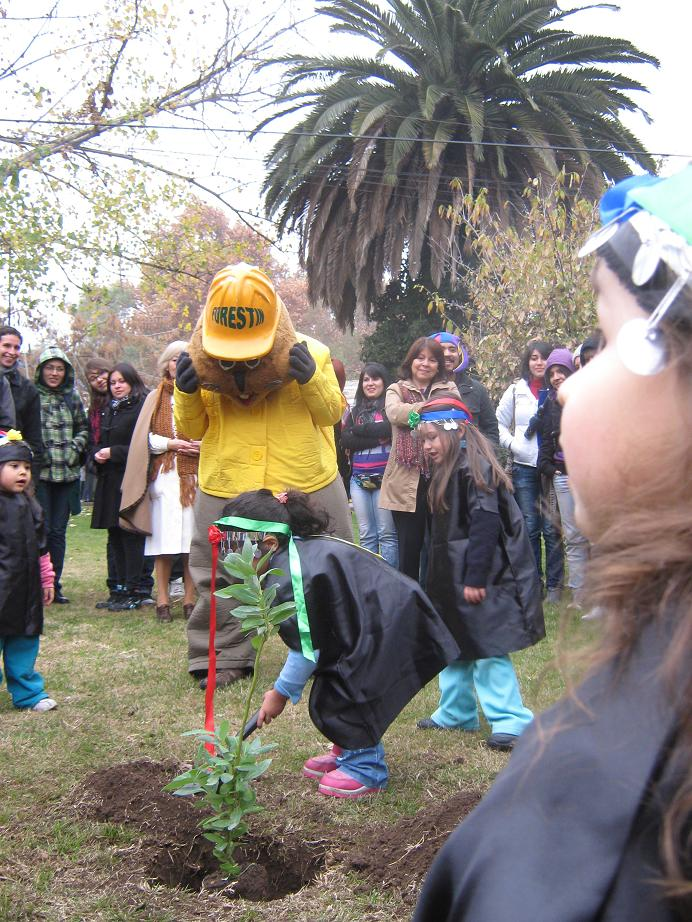
Forestin and kindergarten kids

This includes:

- Contribute to the development of sustainable forestry resources and their use in goods and services that prioritize their responsible use and mitigation of damage to the environment. Contribute to the country's economic, social and environmental development. Replant, recover and care for endemic forest species and trees in urban areas.
- Protect the forest ecosystems from biotic and abiotic agents and harmful events such as: unlawful exploitation, blights and infestations, wildfires, desertification.
- The efficient administration of the National System of Wild Areas Protected by the State (Sistema Nacional de Áreas Silvestres Protegidas del Estado - SNASPE), in order to maximise their environmental, social and economic potential.

== Organization ==
Although CONAF is not technically a government agency, it has similar functions and attributes. It is a "corporación de derecho privado" which in Chile is means a non-profit juridical person, and is wholly dependent of the Ministry of Agriculture of Chile.

=== Administration ===
It is headed by a Directive Council (Consejo Directivo) and administered by an executive director (Director Ejecutivo) named by the Chilean president in office. There are also Regional Directors, overseen by the executive director.

CONAF has three "Gerencias de áreas técnicas" or technical areas of management

- Forest Management:

In charge of preserving the native forest and administrating the sustainable exploitation of the forest ecosystem.

- Wildfires Management:

Responsible for coordinating the wildfires prevention programs and organizing the logistics of fighting wildfires.

- Wild Protected Area Management:

In charge of administrating the National Parks, National Reserves, and Natural Monuments. Responsible for preserving their biodiversity and public access.

CONAF also has a legal department ("Fiscalia"), a financial administration department ("Gerencia de Finanzas y Administración"), and a human resources and development department ("Gerencia de Desarrollo de las Personas").

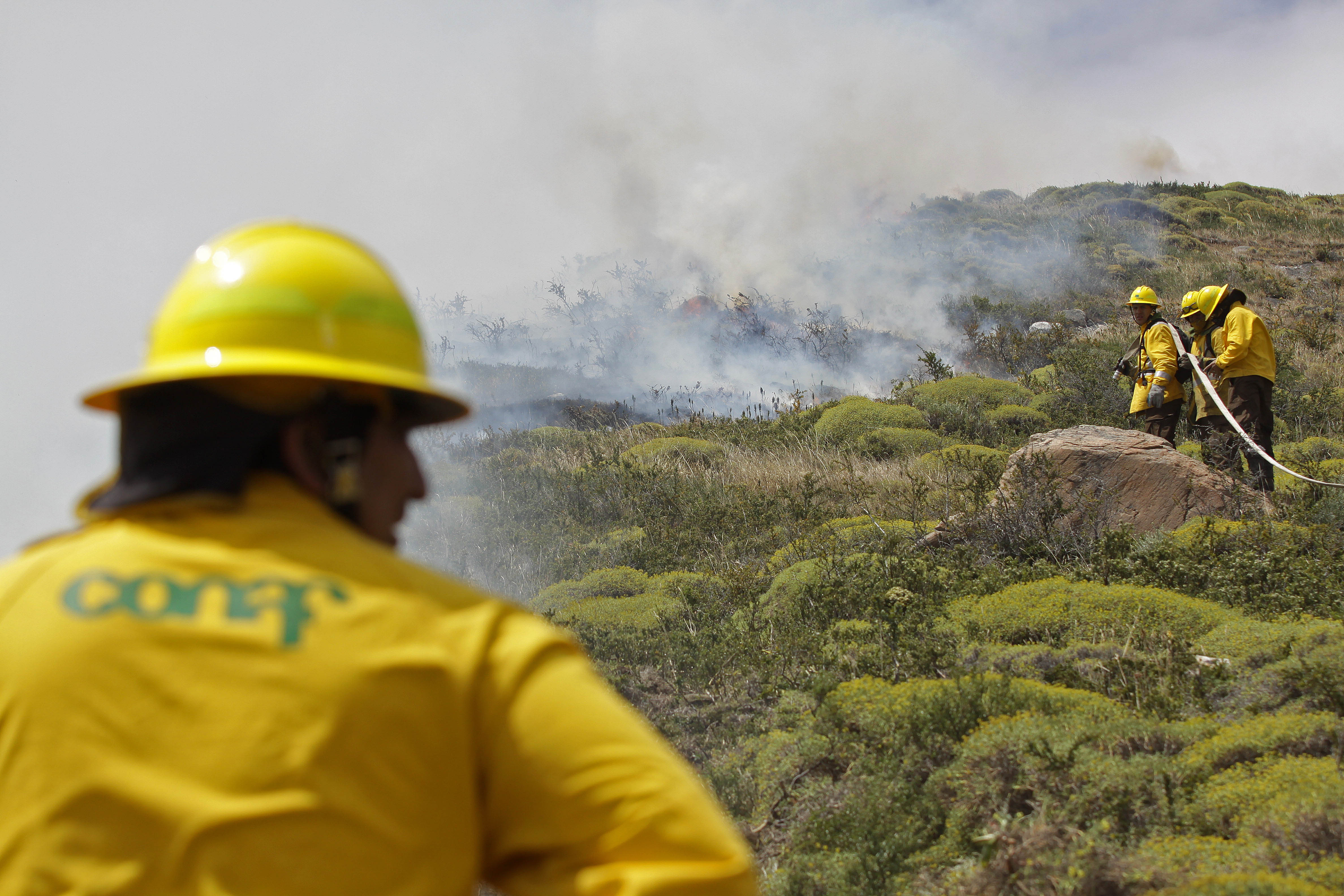
CONAF firefighters in Valparaiso, Chile

Human resources

CONAF has more than 135 offices throughout Chile and more than 1,900 employees (professionals, technicians and administrative staff). 450 of them are highly qualified Park Rangers trained to help visitors.

Material resources

CONAF's resources include Regional Offices, visitor centres and facilities, forest nurseries, wildfire observation towers and bases, and all kind of vehicles to carry out its work in land, water or air.

== See also ==
- List of national parks of Chile
