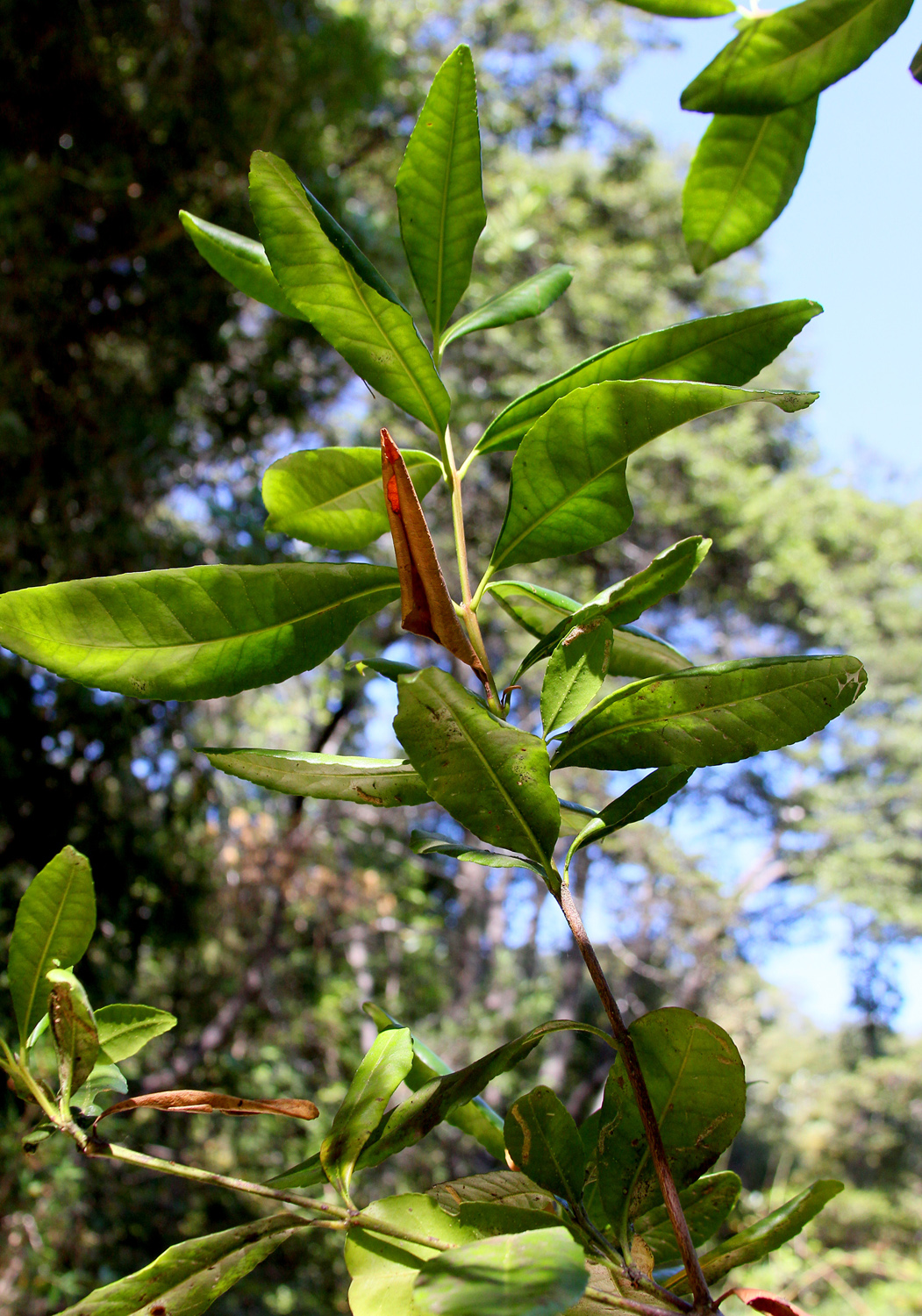

Conservation status
- Endangered (IUCN 3.1)

Scientific classification
- Kingdom: Plantae
- Clade: Tracheophytes
- Clade: Angiosperms
- Clade: Eudicots
- Clade: Rosids
- Order: Sapindales
- Family: Rutaceae
- Genus: Pitavia
- Species: P. punctata

Binomial name
- Pitavia punctata (Ruiz & Pav.) Molina

Synonyms
- Galvezia punctata Ruiz & Pav. (1798)

= Pitavia punctata =

Species of plant

Pitavia punctata is a species of tree endemic to Chile in the family Rutaceae. It is known by the common names Pitao and Pitran. It grows in native deciduous forests in the Chilean Coast Range of central Chile. It is threatened with habitat loss, and is assessed as Endangered.

== Description ==
It is an evergreen small tree or shrub that measures up to 15 m (49 ft) tall and 50 cm (20 in) in diameter, roundish and leafy crown, straight trunk, its branches are inserted in an ascending way. The bark is brownish-grey and soft texture and with roughnesses when adult. The leaves are simple and covered with visible dots against the light, very aromatic (citrus odor), they are arranged in whorls of three or in some cases they are opposite, leathery texture. Oblong and lanceolate-oblong shaped, apex slightly apiculate, attenuate base, petiole about 3–4 mm. Slightly toothed edges and the midrib distinct underneath. The leaves are 6.5–13 cm wide and 2.5–4 cm long. The flowers are hermaphrodite or unisexual about 1 cm 1 diameter, tetramerous, clustered in three-flowered axillary racemes, pedicels about 3–5.9 mm. Calyx is made up by four opposite sepals. Androecium made up by 8 stamens arranged in two whorls, those externals are longer and (4–5.44 mm) and opposite to the sepals while the internal's whorls are shorter (3-3.5 mm) and opposite to the petals. The tetracarpelar gynoecium has a superior ovary, globose and with marginal placentation. Styles about 0.8–0.9 mm, little papillose stigmas, the fruit is made up of globose 1–4 drupes (mostly one) about 1.8–2.5 wide and 1.2–2 cm long, greenish-yellow with dark dots. The glossy dark brown seeds are aovate about 0.8–1.5 cm with toothed edge and oblong shaped, the leaves are petiolate, yellowish-green, about 3–6 cm long.

== Range and habitat ==
Pitavia punctata is endemic to the western (seaward) slopes of Chilean Coast Range of Maule and Bío Bío regions of central Chile, from 35º 21' to 37º45' S.

It grows in native deciduous forests, known as Maulino forest, between 30 and 850 meters elevation. The predominant canopy tree is Nothofagus glauca, with Nothofagus alessandrii and Gomortega keule. Pitavia punctata is typically found in remnant forests with year-round moisture, including ravines and near streams, along with Drimys winteri, Aextoxicon punctatum, Persea lingue.

The trees grow in small subpopulations in remnant forest habitat, surrounded by commercial forest plantations. Small populations are protected in Península de Hualpén Nature Sanctuary, Los Ruiles National Reserve, Los Queules National Reserve, and Nonguén National Park.
