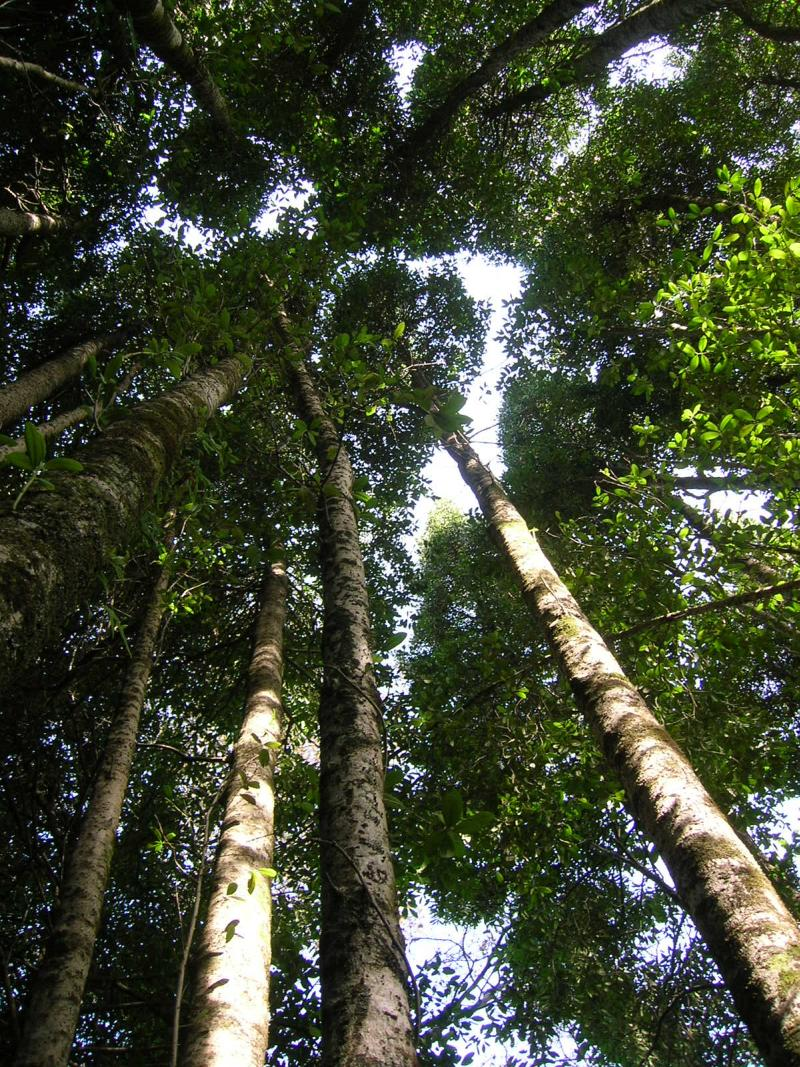
- Gomortega keule in Biobío Region

Conservation status
- Endangered (IUCN 3.1)

Scientific classification
- Kingdom: Plantae
- Clade: Tracheophytes
- Clade: Angiosperms
- Clade: Magnoliids
- Order: Laurales
- Family: Gomortegaceae; Reiche
- Genus: Gomortega; Ruiz & Pav.
- Species: G. keule

Binomial name
- Gomortega keule (Molina) Baill.
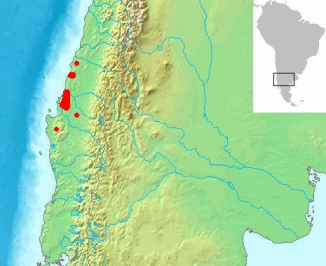

Synonyms
- Adenostemum nitidum (Ruiz & Pav.) Pers. Gomortega nitida Ruiz & Pav. Keulia chilensis Molina; Lucuma keule Molina

= Gomortega =

Species of plant

Gomortega keule (syn. G. nitida; Spanish names keule, queule, and hualhual) is a species of tree endemic to Chile. It is the sole species of the genus Gomortega and, according to the APG IV system of 2016 (unchanged from the APG systems of 2009, 2003 and 1998), of the monotypic family Gomortegaceae, assigned to the order Laurales in the clade magnoliids.

== Description ==
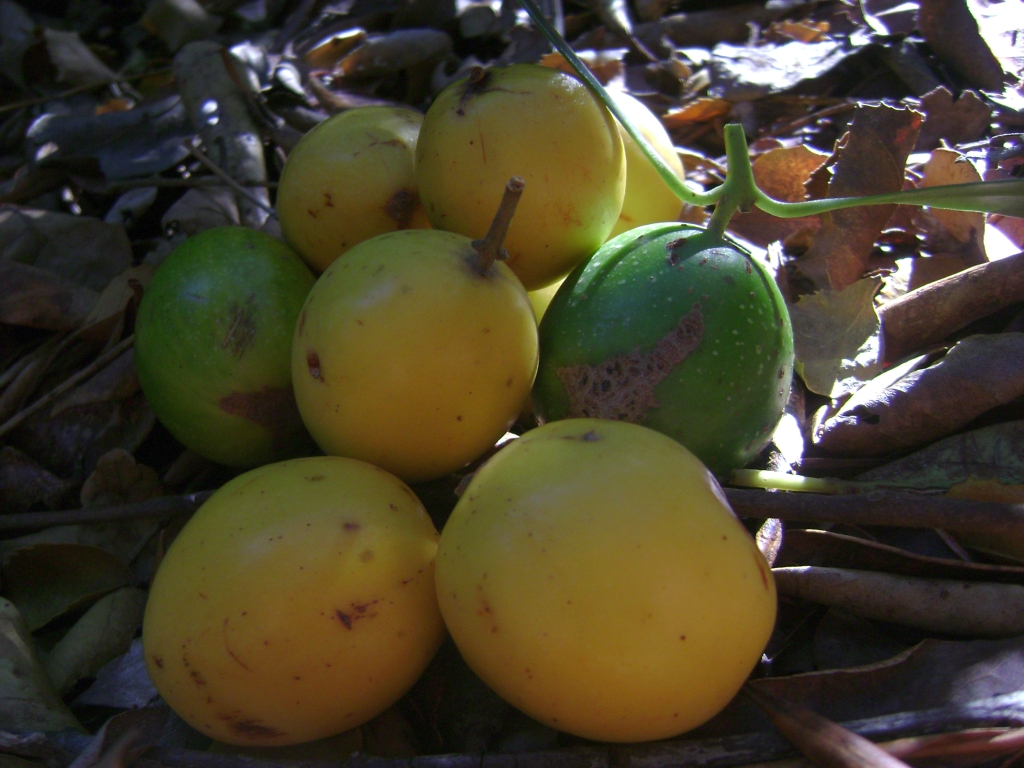
Fruits of G. keule

Evergreen trees, aromatic, gray bark with shallow longitudinal fissures. The leaves are petiolate, simple, entire, obovate to lanceolate, coriaceous. The stems have unilacunar nodes and with two foliar traces. The branches are quadrangular.

The edible fruit is a uni- or tri-locular yellow drupe, usually with 1 (-2) seeds, fleshy mesocarp, pleasant, stony endocarp. There are 1-2 seeds per fruit, with abundant, oily endosperm, large embryo, dicotyledonous. The fruit is about 34–45 millimetres (1.3–1.8 in) in diameter and edible and sweet, and harvested for making a kind of marmalade.

The chromosome number is n = 21, 2n = 42.

== Distribution ==
Gomortega keule grows only in a very narrow habitat range in coastal Central Chile, including the Maulino forest and parts of the Chilean matorral. It is a characteristic tree species of the Maulino forest alongside Nothofagus glauca, Nothofagus × leoni, and Nothofagus alessandrii.

The species is threatened by habitat loss. The Maulino forest has mostly been cleared for agriculture and tree plantations of Pinus radiata and Eucalyptus globulus. The species' remaining habitat is fragmented, and its populations isolated. It has been affected by fires, including the 2017 Chile wildfires. Populations are protected at Los Queules National Reserve and Los Ruiles National Reserve.

== See also ==
- Beilschmiedia berteroana
- Avellanita bustillosii
- Pouteria splendens
