= Adriana Hoffmann =

Chilean botanist, environmentalist, and author (1940–2022)

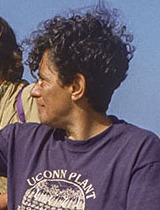
- Hoffmann in 1991
- Born: Adriana Elisabeth Hoffmann Jacoby; 29 January 1940; Santiago, Chile
- Died: 20 March 2022 (aged 82)
- Other name: Adriana Hoffmann Jacoby
- Education: University of Chile
- Known for: Describing 106 species of cactus
- Scientific career
- Fields: Botany, ecology
- Workplaces: Defensores del Bosque Chileno
- Author abbrev. (botany): A.E.Hoffm.

Adriana Elisabeth Hoffmann Jacoby (29 January 1940 – 20 March 2022) was a Chilean botanist, environmentalist and author. She was executive secretary of Chile's National Environment Commission (Spanish: Comisión Nacional del Medio Ambiente, CONAMA) from 2000 to 2001. She advocated for the sustainable management and protection of Chilean forests, leading opposition to illegal logging in her role as coordinator of Defensores del Bosque Chileno (Defenders of the Chilean Forest) since 1992.

Hoffmann authored over a dozen books on the flora of Chile, as well as 106 botanical names, mostly realignments of species and infraspecific taxa of cactus.

== Biography ==
Adriana Hoffmann was born in Santiago to Lola (née Jacoby) and Franz Hoffmann in 1940. She grew up in Providencia and attended Liceo Manuel de Salas. She was accepted at the University of Chile where she initially studied agronomy. She joined her mother when she traveled to Germany to study psychiatric techniques and there Adriana changed her focus to biology and specialized in botany and ecology. After she finished her studies, she returned to Chile and married engineer Hernán Calderón. They lived abroad for a time until returning to Chile in the 1970s.

Through her career, Hoffmann traveled throughout Chile, documenting flora and describing species. By April 2008, she had identified and classified 106 new cactus species.

In 1992, Hoffmann became coordinator of the non-profit organization Defensores del Bosque Chileno, Chile's largest forest protection group. She formed Agrupación de Defensores del Bosque Nativo in 1994, a group whose founding members included well-known singers and poets as well as economist Manfred Max Neef and Bishop Bernardino Piñera. By the mid-1990s, Hoffmann was recognized as one of Chile's premier environmental activists.

Hoffmann served on the board of the Lahuen Foundation, a forest preservation organization that established El Cañi Sanctuary. She also played a leading role in the Chilean Science Society, Biology Society of Chile, Earth Foundation, International Union for Conservation of Nature, and the Association of Chilean Female Leaders. Hoffmann's efforts with Defensores del Bosque included developing environmental education programs for teachers.

Hoffmann was appointed by President Ricardo Lagos in March 2000 to serve as executive secretary of the National Environment Commission, a precursor of Chile's Ministry for the Environment. During her tenure she oversaw the creation of the national hiking trail network Sendero de Chile, improved the System of Environmental Impact Assessment (SEIA), and worked to implement environmental education programs and improve air quality in Santiago. During her tenure she encountered criticism from business interests for her environmentalist stances and from environmental groups for her perceived lack of influence within the administration. Following the controversial approval of petcoke for gas-fired generators over her objections, Hoffmann resigned in October 2001, stating that she no longer felt she was supported by Lagos or the Ministers. She returned to work with Defensores del Bosque and prepared for her eventual retirement.

Hoffmann died on 20 March 2022.

== Environmental advocacy ==
During Pinochet's dictatorship, the government gave multinational timber firms unfettered access to Chilean forests and little incentive to process the lumber in-country. Hoffmann has noted that the rapidly disappearing private native forests are mostly wasted through exports of wood chips. In a 1995 article she remarked: "We've seen with our own eyes how [timber companies] take immense trees and shred the whole thing, branches and all." Beginning with her involvement with Defensores del Bosque, Hoffmann agitated for the reform of Chilean forestry practices. She was a vocal advocate for sustainable forest management in the country, arguing that ecotourism and value-added products like furniture lead to greater long-term revenue.

Hoffmann wrote columns about ecology for El Mercurio in the 1990s and opposed free trade agreements that would replace native forests with commercial tree plantations. She criticized the Chilean government for not adopting a forestry policy.

Hoffmann befriended American businessman and preservationist Douglas Tompkins, who provided funding for Defensores del Bosque. She defended his efforts to establish a 1,200-acre nature reserve in the Chilean Lake District. The New York Times reported that she said: "If this investment were anywhere else but Chile, Mr. Tompkins would be considered a hero. But it happened in Chile, where envy and jealousy and business interests are institutions."

== Awards and honors ==
Hoffmann was recognized by the United Nations in 1997 as one of the 25 leading environmentalists of the decade for her efforts to protect Chile's forests. For her research into Chilean flora and her work in environmental education, Hoffmann received the Luis Oyarzún Award from the Austral University of Chile in 2003. She received a Fellow Award from the Cactus and Succulent Society of America in 2009.

Hoffmann served on the judging panel for the United Nations Environment Programme's Sasakawa Prize.

== Works ==
Hoffmann authored more than a dozen books and illustrated field guides on the flora, medicinal plants and botanical resources of Chile. Among her works was La Tragedia del Bosque Chileno, which includes text and photographs that document illegal logging in Chilean forests.

Papers

- Hoffmann, Adriana; Kummerow, Jochen (1978). "Root Studies in the Chilean Matorral". Oecologia. 32 (1): 57–69. Bibcode:1978Oecol..32...57H. doi:10.1007/bf00344689. JSTOR 4215552. PMID 28308666. S2CID 30682406.

Books

- Hoffmann J., Adriana (1978). Flora silvestre de Chile / zona central : una guía para la identificación de las especies vegetales más frecuentes. Santiago: Fundación Claudio Gay. OCLC 503242201.
- —— (1982). Flora silvestre de Chile / zona austral : Una guía ilustrada para la identificación de las especies de plantas leñosas del sur de Chile. Santiago de Chile: Ediciones Fundacion Claudio Gay. OCLC 715468373.
- ——; Farga, Christina; Lastra, Jorge (1988). Plantas medicinales de uso comun en Chile T. 1. Santiago, Chile: Paesmi. OCLC 831403901.
- ——; Jullían, Andrés (1989). Cactaceas en la flora silvestre de Chile : una guía para la identificación de los cactos que crecen en el país. Santiaga de Chile: Ed. Fundacion Claudio Gay. OCLC 716491772.
- ——; Mendoza, Marcelo (1990). De cómo Margarita Flores puede cuidar su salud y ayudar a salvar el planeta. Santiago: Casa de Paz. OCLC 31970038.
- —— (1992). Vegetación y flora de la alta cordillera de Santiago. Santiago: Cía. Minera La Disputada de Las Condes. OCLC 55302269.
- ——; Sierra, Malú; Donoso, Magdalena (1997). Ecología e historia natural de la zona central de Chile. Santiago: Defensores del Bosque Chileno. ISBN 9789567721016.
- —— (1998). Plantas Altoandinas en la flora silvestre de Chile. Santiago: Ed. Fundación Claudio Gay. ISBN 9789567743001.
- —— (1983). El árbol urbano en Chile. Ediciones Fundación Claudio Gay. OCLC 10967952.
- —— (1998). La Tragedia del Bosque Chileno. Santiago, Chile: Ocho Libros Editores. ISBN 9789567721108.
- —— (2000). Enciclopedia de los bosques chilenos : conservación, biodiversidad, sustentabilidad. Santiago, Chile: Defensores del Bosque Chileno. ISBN 9789567721238.
- —— (2001). Plantar, plantar, plantar : manual de reproducción y plantación de flora nativa chilena. Santiago de Chile: Defensores del bosque Chileno. ISBN 9789567721351.

== See also ==
- Claudio Donoso
- Native Forest Law
- Edmundo Pisano
- Jurgen Rottmann
- Carolina Villagrán

| Preceded by Rodrigo Egaña Baraona | Executive Secretary of the National Environment Commission in Chile; March 2000 – October 2001 | Succeeded by Gianni López Ramírez |
