= Adalbus =

Scientific classification
- Kingdom: Animalia
- Phylum: Arthropoda
- Class: Insecta
- Order: Coleoptera
- Suborder: Polyphaga
- Infraorder: Cucujiformia
- Family: Cerambycidae
- Subfamily: Cerambycinae
- Tribe: Bimiini
- Genus: Adalbus; Fairmaire & Germain, 1859
- Species: A. crassicornis

Binomial name
- Adalbus crassicornis Fairmaire & Germain, 1859

Synonyms
- Adalbus dimidiatipennis Fairmaire & Germain, 1859; Adalbus flavipennis Fairmaire & Germain, 1859; Adalbus proteus Germain, 1900

Genus of beetles

Adalbus crassicornis is a species of longhorn beetle in the Cerambycinae subfamily, and the only species in the genus Adalbus. It was described by Fairmaire and Germain in 1859. It is known from Chile and western Argentina. Its host plants are Nothofagus pumilio, Nothofagus dombeyi, Nothofagus antarctica, and Nothofagus alpina. Specimens have been collected in regions where the Chilean pine grows, including Cordillera de Nahuelbuta, Cherquenco, and Caramávida.
