= Los Queules National Reserve =

Chilean protected nature area

- IUCN category IV (habitat/species management area)
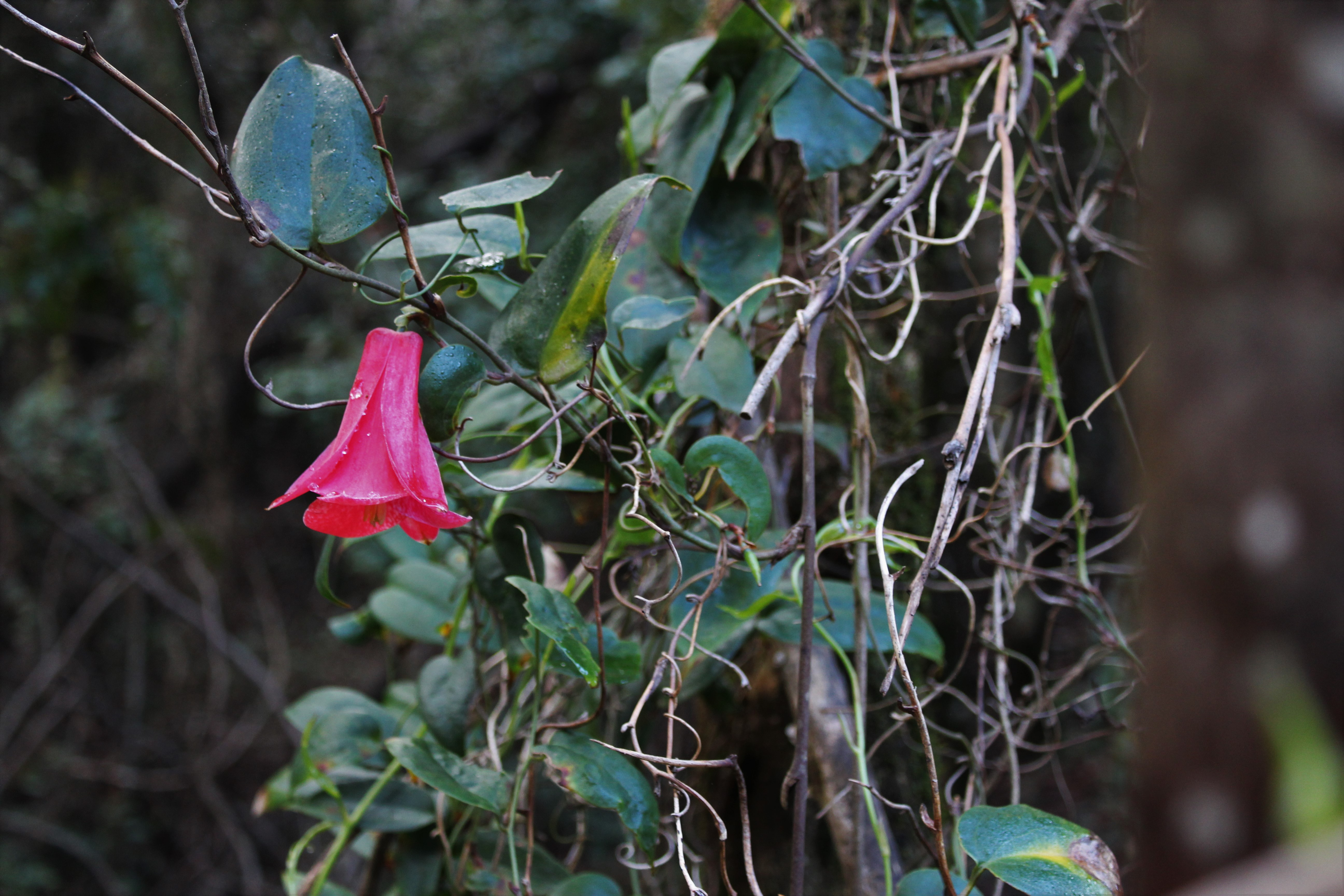
- Copihue (Lapageria rosea) in Los Queules National Reserve
- Interactive map of Los Queules National Reserve
- Location: Maule Region, Chile
- Nearest city: Cauquenes
- Coordinates: 35.9492°S 72.6159°W
- Area: 1.47 km^{2} (0.57 sq mi)
- Designation: National Reserve
- Established: 1995
- Governing body: CONAF

Los Queules National Reserve is a national reserve of Chile. It covers an area of 1.47 km^{2} in the Chilean Coastal Range. The reserve ranges from 400 to 500 meters in elevation.

The reserve contains one of the larger remaining patches of Maulino forest, a distinctive forest community at the transition between Mediterranean climate central Chile and the cool and humid Valdivian temperate forests further south.

The reserve is named after the queule tree (Gomortega keule), a species native to the Maulino forest. Other characteristic Maulino forest species present in the reserve include Pitavia punctata, Nothofagus alessandrii, and Nothofagus glauca. Outside the reserve the Maulino forests have been mostly extirpated and replaced with plantations of non-native radiata pine (Pinus radiata) or converted to agriculture or livestock pasture.
