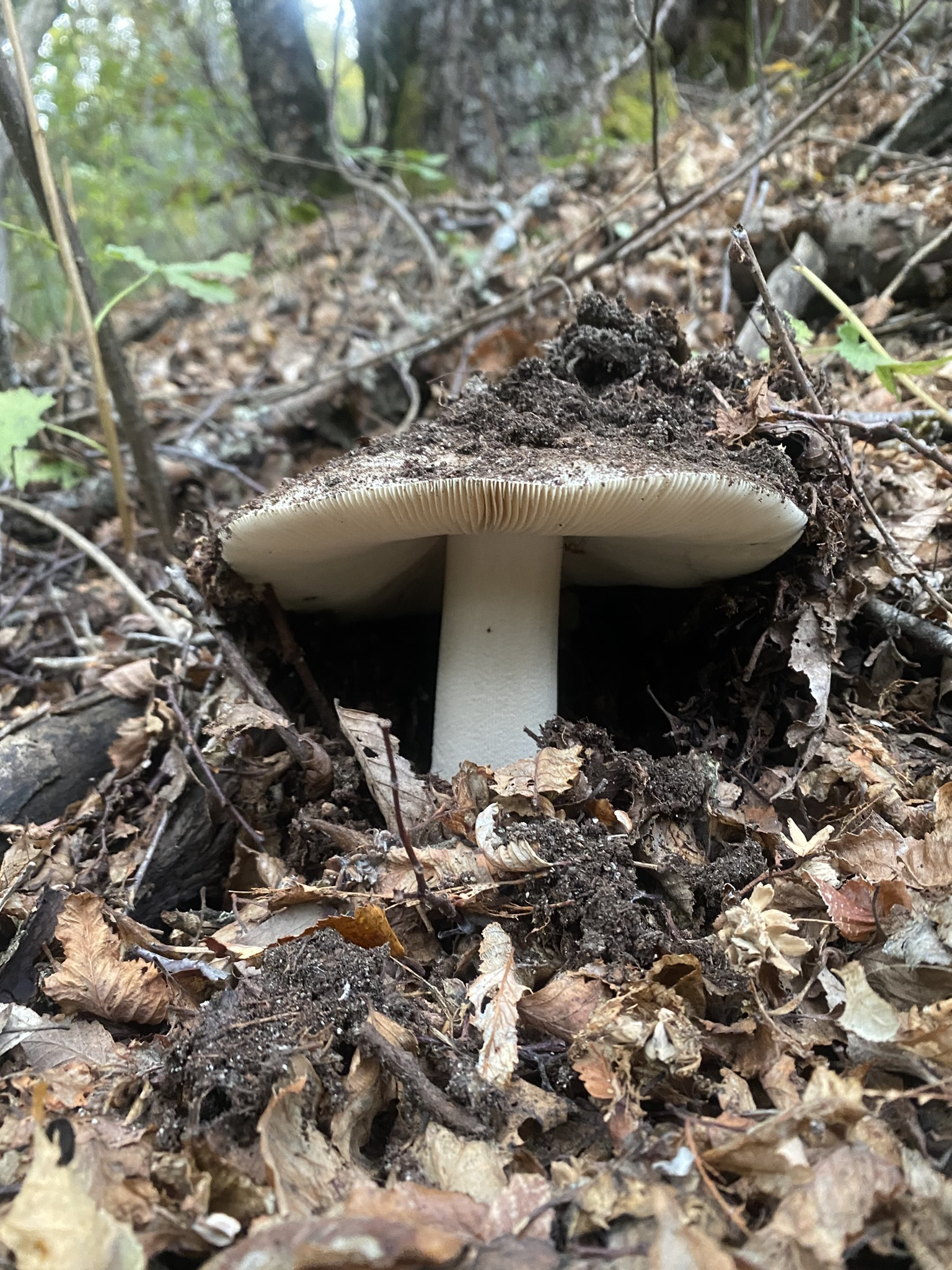

Scientific classification
- Kingdom: Fungi
- Division: Basidiomycota
- Class: Agaricomycetes
- Order: Agaricales
- Family: Amanitaceae
- Genus: Amanita
- Species: A. merxmuelleri

Binomial name
- Amanita merxmuelleri Bresinsky & Garrido, 1985

= Amanita merxmuelleri =

Species of mushroom

Amanita merxmuelleri is a mushroom described by Bresinsky & Garrido from the Amanita genus. Common names include rau-rau and piojento.

== Description ==
Amanita merxmuelleri has a 65–150 mm wide, gray-brown cap. When young, its cap is hemispheric to convex, whilst young, and later the cap shape is depressed. The flesh inside the mushroom is whitish. The volva is presented as irregularly placed warts on the disc.

== Range ==
Amanita merxmuelleri is found in Argentina and Chile.

== Ecology ==
Amanita merxmuelleri is an ectomycorrhizal mushroom that forms a relationship with plants from the Nothofagus genus, such as N. pumilio, N. dombeyi, and N. obliqua.

== Edibility ==
The mushroom is free of any dangerous chemicals found other Amanita mushrooms. However, eating mushrooms from the Amanita genus is not recommended.
