= Villagrán =

Villagrán may refer to:

== Places ==
- Villagrán, Guanajuato, Mexican city and municipality
- Villagrán, Tamaulipas, Mexican city and municipality

== People ==
- Adriana Villagrán, Argentine tennis player
- Carlos Villagrán, Mexican actor
- Carolina Villagrán, Chilean biologist
- Cristian Villagrán, Swiss-Argentine tennis player
- Felipe Villagrán, Chilean footballer
- Fernanda Villagran, Chilean field hockey player
- Francisco Villagrán Kramer, politician of Guatemala
- José Villagrán García, Mexican architect
- Julián Villagrán, Spanish actor
- Ricardo Villagrán, Argentine illustrator
