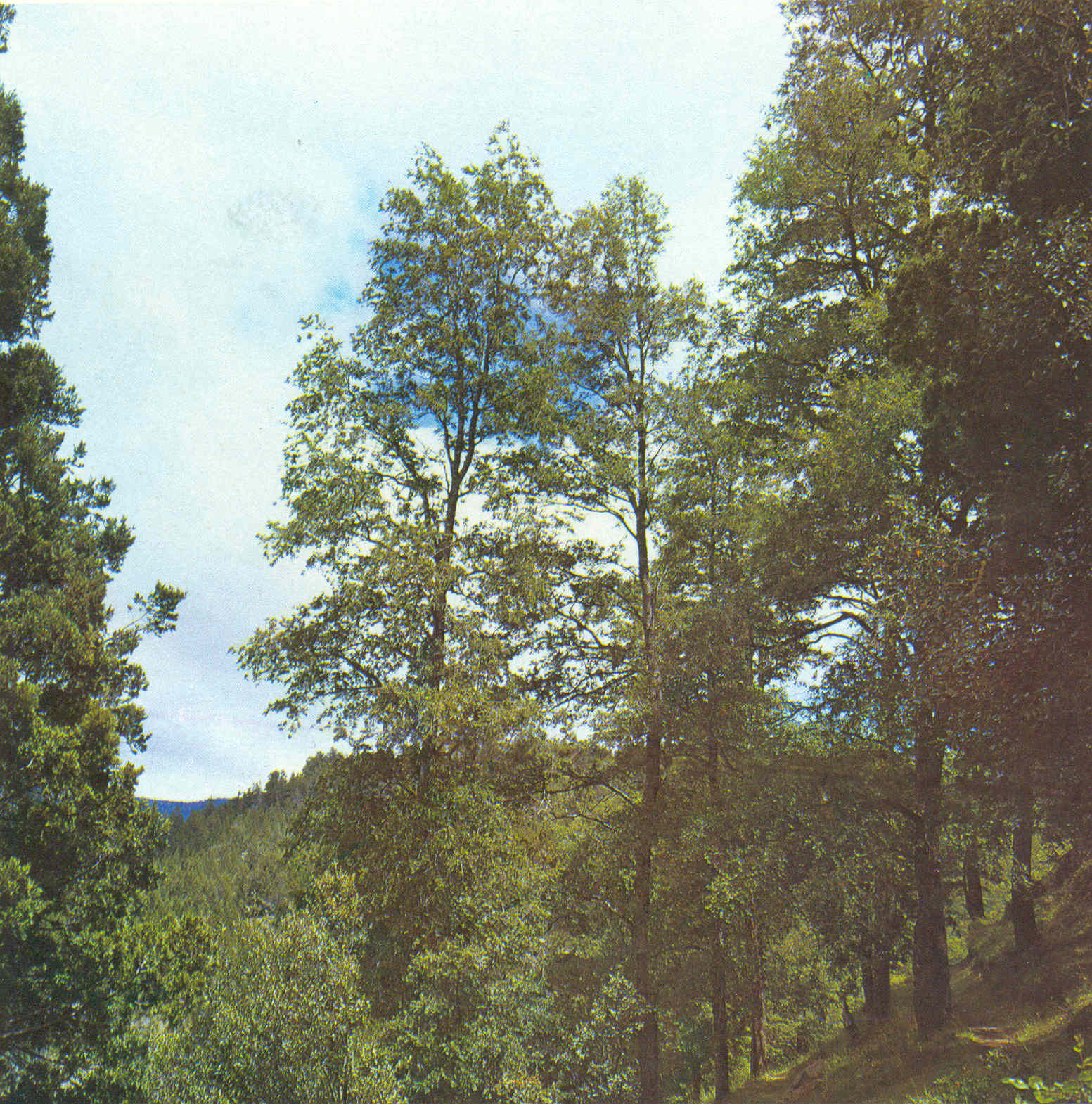
- Adult tree

Conservation status
- Least Concern (IUCN 3.1)

Scientific classification
- Kingdom: Plantae
- Clade: Embryophytes
- Clade: Tracheophytes
- Clade: Spermatophytes
- Clade: Angiosperms
- Clade: Eudicots
- Clade: Rosids
- Order: Fagales
- Family: Nothofagaceae
- Genus: Nothofagus
- Subgenus: Nothofagus subg. Lophozonia
- Species: N. alpina

Binomial name
- Nothofagus alpina Popp. & Endl.

Synonyms
- Lophozonia alpina Nothofagus procera Fagus alpina

= Nothofagus alpina =

Species of plant

Nothofagus alpina, also called raulí (in the Mapuche language) or raulí beech, is a species of plant in the Nothofagaceae family. A deciduous tree, it grows in Chile and Argentina, reaching 50 m (160 ft) in height and more than 2 m (6.6 ft) in diameter. It is distributed from 35–42° south latitude. It is found in the Andes. It tolerates low temperatures and heavy winds. It has a straight and cylindrical trunk with grey bark.

N. alpina was proposed to be renamed Lophozonia alpina in 2013.

== Description ==
Monoecious and leafy. Alternate leaves, petioles 3–2 mm long, oblong ovate to lanceolate ovate, with glands and hairs regularly distributed, undulate margins and softly serrated. Lamina 4–12 x 2.5–5 cm, pinnate veins, pilose and very notorious, mostly below the leaf, new borne green shoots pubescent with brown felt-like hairs.

Flowers small and unisexual: male in clusters of 3 flowers, briefly pedicellate, numerous stamens, male flowers disposed in 3 inflorescences supported by a peduncle about 1 cm long.

Fruit made up by a cupule of 4 narrow valves, in its interior 2–3 little yellowish nuts 6 mm long, a little hairy, being the two lower triangular, tri-winged, and the flat internal, bi-winged.

Raulí wood is pinkish with brown-reddish color and has a very fine grain. It is relatively easy to work and of medium weight. It is used in furniture, barrels for fine Chilean wines, doors, veneers, shingles and floors. It has been introduced as ornamental in Great Britain and it grows well in western Scotland, where it gets the necessary rainfall for good growth, a minimum of 750 mm (30 in) a year. It is promising as a forestry tree in western Great Britain and regenerates easily after coppicing.

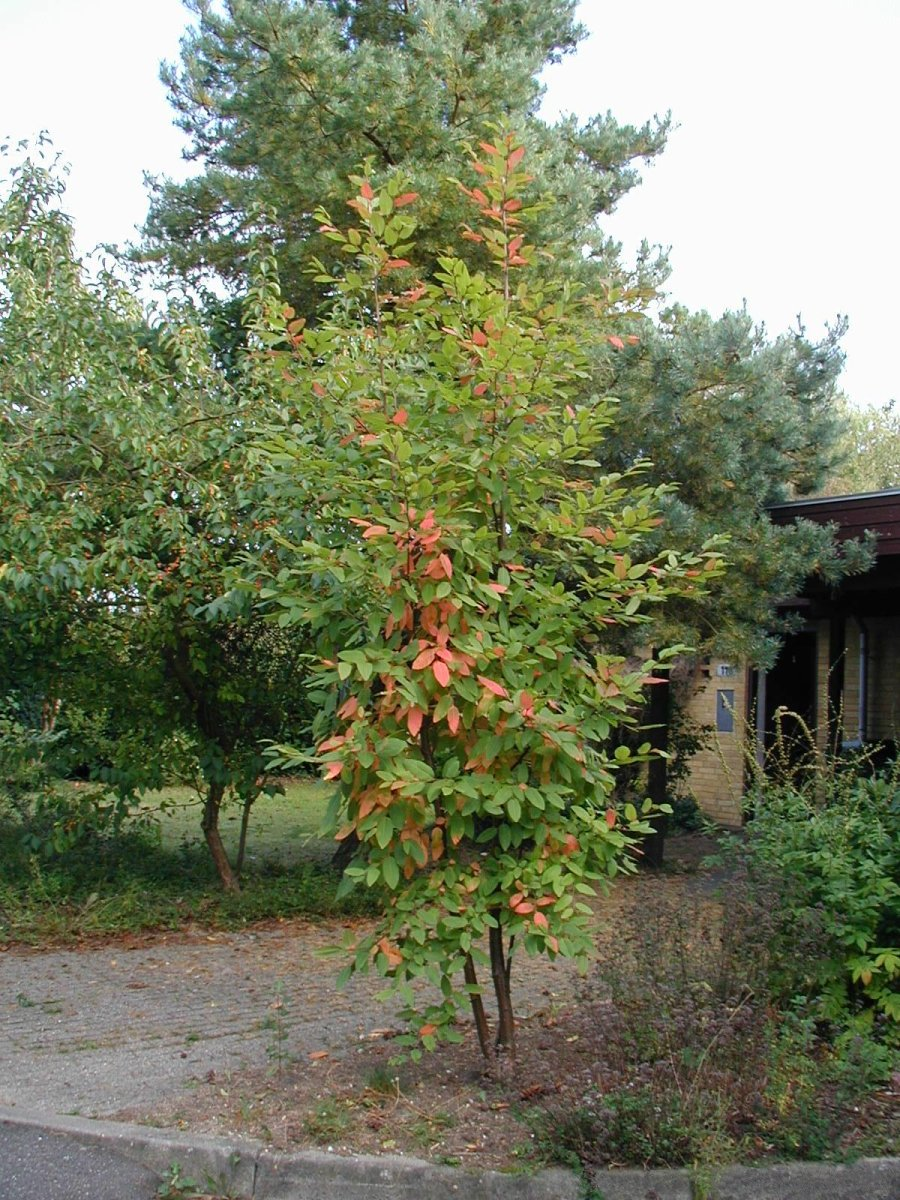
Young tree

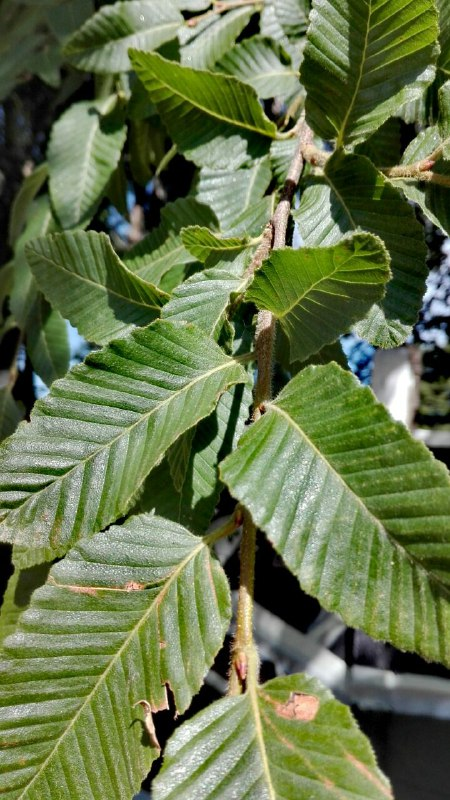
Leaves

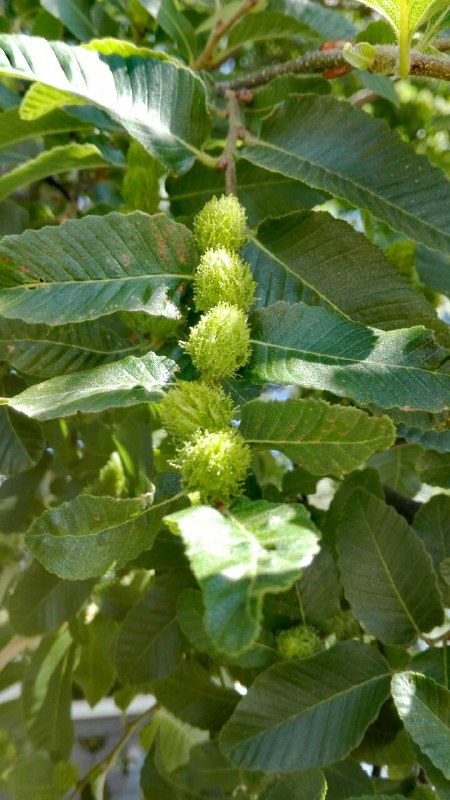
Flowers

== Frost hardiness study in Britain ==
Seedlots of N. alpina and Nothofagus obliqua of different provenance in their native range were tested in cultivation at the Bush estate in Scotland. The results of the testing in relation to the sources were reported as:

- Ñuble in Chile. This was the most equatorial source and these seedlots proved to be the most susceptible to frost.
- Neuquen in Argentina. These seedlots, as well as those gathered from mature trees growing in Britain with origins from Malleco in Chile, were the most hardy. Overall, N. alpina performed better than N. obliqua.

Past temperature records for Britain suggest that seedlots run a high risk of suffering severe frost damage in all but mild coastal regions, and that spring and autumn frosts may be more damaging than winter frosts.

Experimental plantations established in Wales suffered severe damage during the 1981–1982 cold wave that swept through Britain.

== Other locations ==
At Nautesund in Norway, where the extreme minimum annual temperature is −14 °C (7 °F), a south-facing exposure, good rainfall, and shelter from polar winds allow specimens of rauli to grow.

== Hybrids ==
- N. alpina hybridises with N. obliqua to form the hybrid species Nothofagus × dodecaphleps.

== References and external links ==
- Donoso, C. 2005. Árboles nativos de Chile. Guía de reconocimiento. Edición 4. Marisa Cuneo Ediciones, Valdivia, Chile. 136p.
- Hoffmann, Adriana. 1998. Flora Silvestre de Chile, Zona Central. Edición 4. Fundación Claudio Gay, Santiago. 254p.
- Rodríguez, R. & Quezada, M. 2003. Fagaceae. En C. Marticorena y R. Rodríguez [eds.], Flora de Chile Vol. 2(2), pp 64–76. Universidad de Concepción, Concepción.
- Bean. W. 1981 Trees and Shrubs Hardy in Great Britain. Vol 1–4 and Supplement. Murray.
