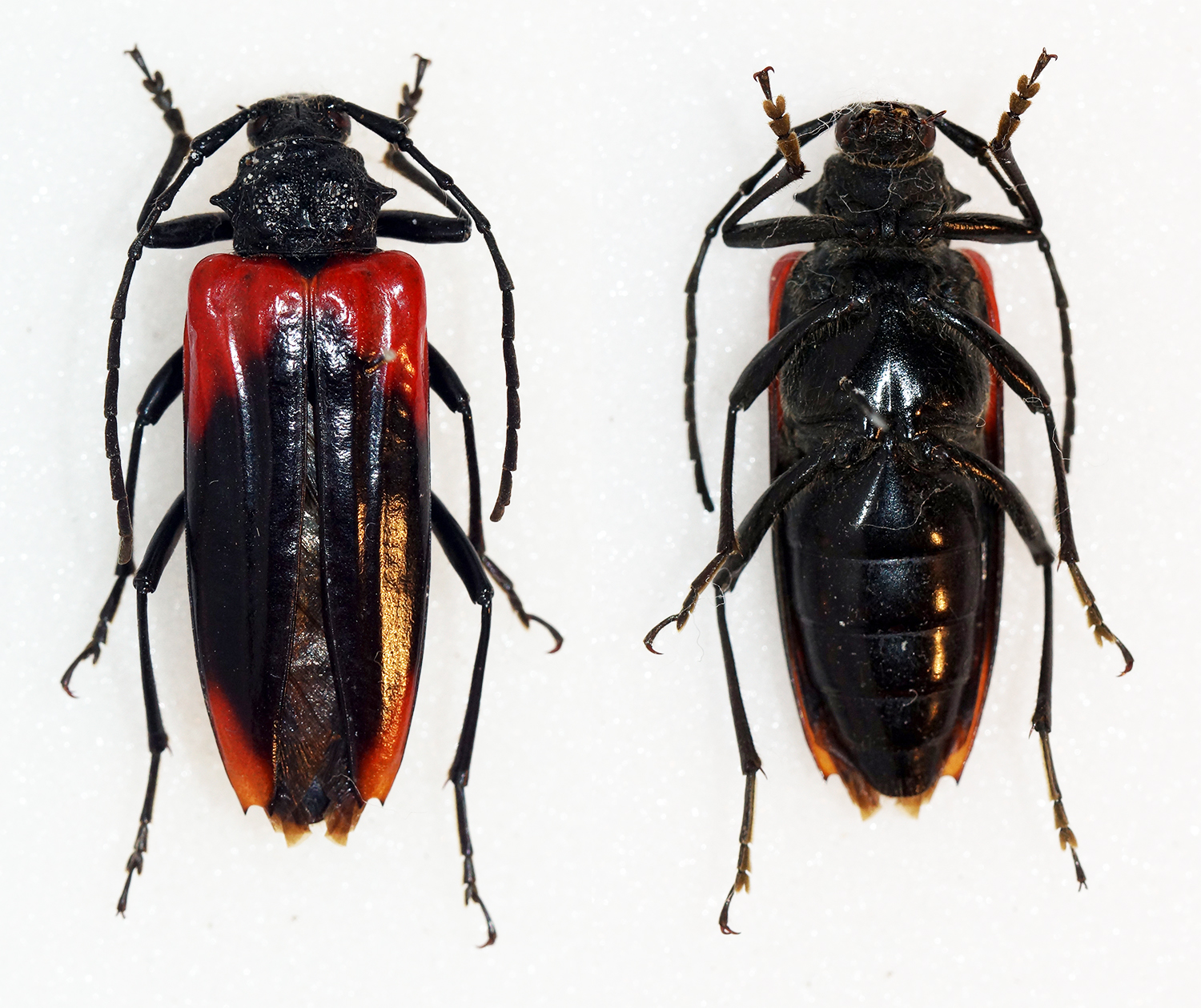
- Zehra coemeterii (Thomson, 1856)

Scientific classification
- Kingdom: Animalia
- Phylum: Arthropoda
- Class: Insecta
- Order: Coleoptera
- Suborder: Polyphaga
- Infraorder: Cucujiformia
- Family: Cerambycidae
- Subfamily: Cerambycinae
- Tribe: Bimiini

= Bimiini =

Tribe of beetles

Bimiini is a tribe of beetles in the subfamily Cerambycinae, containing the following genera and species:

- Genus Adalbus
  - Adalbus crassicornis Fairmaire & Germain, 1859
- Genus Bimia
  - Bimia bicolor White, 1850
  - Bimia waterhousei Pascoe, 1864
  - Bimia semiflava Saunders, 1850
- Genus Lautarus
  - Lautarus concinnus (Philippi & Philippi, 1859)
- Genus Phantazoderus
  - Phantazoderus frenatus Fairmaire & Germain, 1864
- Genus Zehra
  - Zehra coemeterii (Thomson, 1856)
  - Zehra flavosignata (Fairmaire & Germain, 1859)
  - Zehra integra (Fairmaire & Germain, 1859)
  - Zehra krahmeri (Cerda, 1973)
  - Zehra livida (Germain, 1900)
