= Maulino forest =

Forest type in Chile

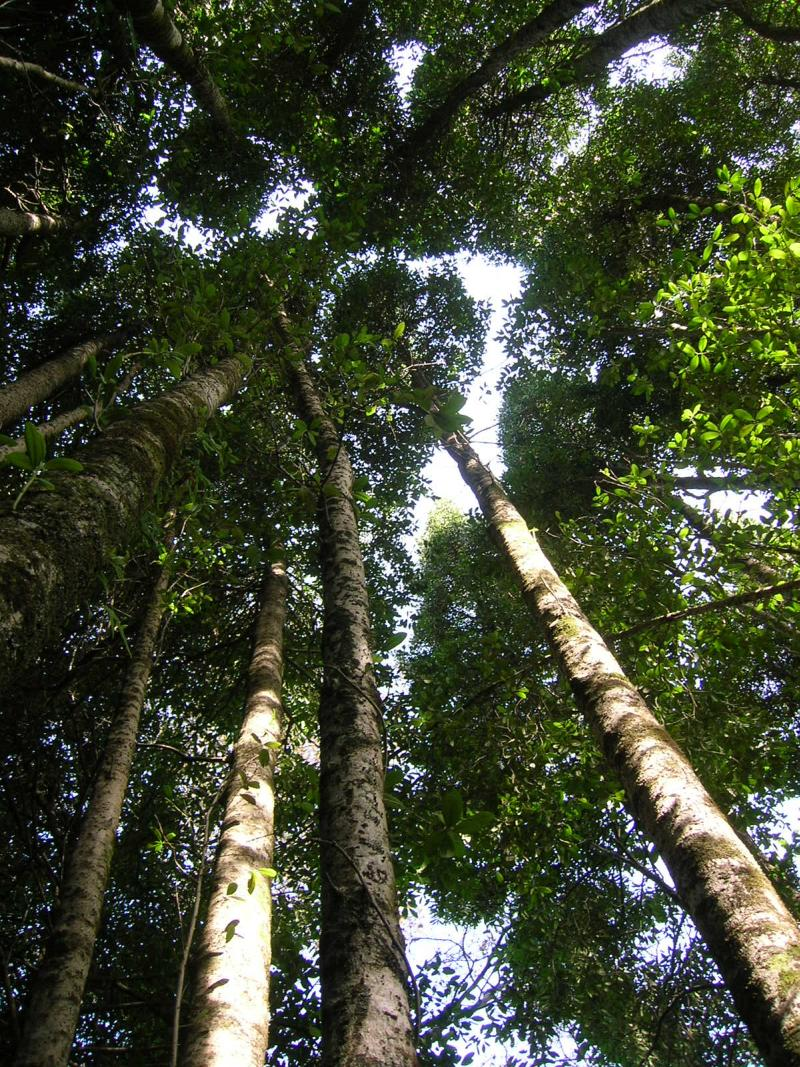
Gomortega keule stand in Bío Bío Region.

Maulino forest (Spanish: Bosque Maulino) is a forest type naturally growing in the Chilean Coast Range of Central Chile from latitude 35°55 to 36°20 S. The forest grows in the transition zone between Mediterranean climate and humid temperate climate. Precipitation varies from 1000 to 700 mm/a and is concentrated in winter. According to geographers Humberto Fuenzalida and Edmundo Pisano the forest is one of mesophytes on the transition zone of temperate rain forests.

== Flora ==
The chief tree species is Nothofagus glauca. Other tree species include Nothofagus × leoni , Nothofagus alessandrii and Gomortega keule.

José San Martín and Claudio Donoso identify three forest subtypes:

- Nothofagus glauca forests
- Nothofagus antarctica forests
- Nothofagus alessandrii forest

Maulino forest stand out for its high degree of endemism.

== Fauna ==
Native birds include the Magellanic tapaculo (Scytalopus magellanicus), ochre-flanked tapaculo (Eugralla paradoxa), and Chestnut-throated huet-huet (Pteroptochos castaneus).

The southern pudu (Pudu puda) has been observed in the forest, including at Tregualemu in Pelluhue municipality.

== Fragmentation and degradation ==
Large swathes of former Maulino forest were cleared for agriculture. This led to significant soil erosion before the areas were planted with Eucalyptus globulus and Pinus radiata. Fragmentation by plantations have had limited or no apparent effect on the native fauna of understory birds (tapaculos) and epigeic beetles. It has been suggested the fragmentation by plantations do not have any major impact if the plantations contain an adequate understory. However, the diversity of small mammals has been reduced by fragmentation.

By unit area the tree species richness is greater in small Maulino forest fragments than in the larger fragment protected in Los Queules National Reserve. While fragmented Maulino forest have been to some degree invaded by exotic species these fragments are still valuable for their native species diversity. In view of this researchers Pablo I. Becerra and Javier A. Simonetti fragmentation is a lesser evil compared with the replacement of Maulino forest.

== Protected areas ==
Los Queules National Reserve protects 145 hectares of a 600-hectare fragment of native forest. The predominant canopy tree is hualo (Nothfagus glauca). Other native trees include queule (Gomortega keule), after which the reserve is named.

Los Ruiles National Reserve protects about 45 hectares of Maulino forest, which include ruil (Nothofagus alessandrii) after which the reserve is named.
