= Los Ruiles National Reserve =

Protected area in Maule Region of Chile

- IUCN category IV (habitat/species management area)
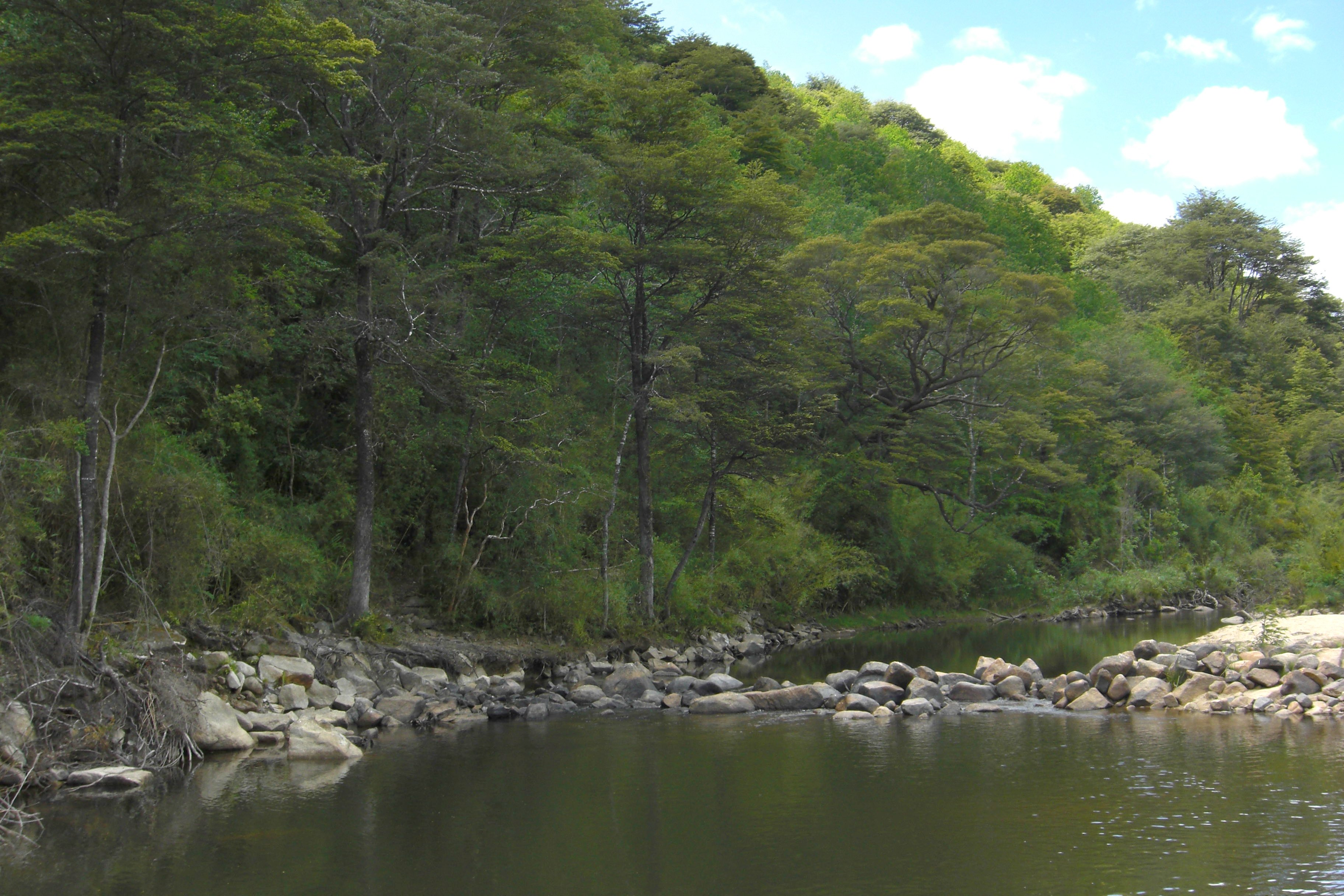
- Los Ruiles National Reserve
- Interactive map of Los Ruiles National Reserve
- Location: Maule Region, Chile
- Nearest city: Pelluhue
- Coordinates: 35°37′S 72°21′W
- Area: 0.45 km^{2} (0.17 sq mi)
- Designation: National Reserve
- Designated: 1982
- Administrator: Corporación Nacional Forestal (CONAF)

Los Ruiles National Reserve is a small nature reserve located in Cauquenes Province of Maule Region in central Chile. The reserve consists of two sections that protect enclaves of native forest, which are home to several threatened and endangered species.

== Location ==
Los Ruiles reserve lies in the foothills of the Chilean Coast Range (Cordillera de la Costa), and has an area of 45 hectares (110 acres). The reserve consists of two separate sections. The Los Ruiles section is 29 hectares (72 acres), in the valley of the Curanilahue River in Chanco municipality, on the boundary with Pelluhue municipality, near the road connecting Chanco and Cauquenes (72°30’30" W, 35°49’’30" S). The Los Ruiles section ranges from 200 to 400 meters elevation. The El Fin section lies to the northeast, in the valley of the Pino Talca River in Empedrado municipality (72°21’0"W, 35°37’30"S). Both rivers flow westwards through shallow valleys to empty into the Pacific. The Curanilahue River flows year-round, and the Pino Talca is mostly dry during the summer months.

== Flora and fauna ==
The reserve is mostly forested. The predominant forest type is Chilean Coast Range mountain forest, also known as Maulino forest (bosque caducifolio Maulino) or the Nothofagus glauca–Azara petiolaris association. Maulino forest is a forest community at the transition between the humid Valdivian temperate forests of south-central Chile and the Mediterranean-climate Chilean matorral of central Chile. The reserve is rich in woody plants, with about 80 reported tree and shrub species. Dominant trees include several winter-deciduous species of Nothofagus or southern beech, including Nothofagus dombeyi, N. glauca, N. × leoni, and N. alessandrii. Other dominant trees include Luma apiculata, Podocarpus salignus, Lithraea caustica, boldo (Peumus boldus), and Quillaja saponaria. The reserve is home to 72 species of mosses, including several Valdivian and Patagonian species at their northern distribution limit.

The reserve is the northern limit of some southern species, including the trees Weinmannia trichosperma and Embothrium coccineum. It is home to several threatened and endangered species, including ruil (Nothofagus alessandrii), after which the reserve is named, and Pitavia punctata, Nothofagus glauca, N. x leoni, and Citronella mucronata. Southern endemic mosses at or near their northern limit in the reserve include Achrophyllum magellanicum var. magellanicum, Ancistrodes genuflexa, Breutelia subplicata, Lembophyllum orbiculatum, Campylopus chilensis, Catagonium nitens subsp. nitens, Chrysoblastella chilensis, Cryphaea consimilis, Cryphaeophilum molle, Dendrocryphaea gorveana, Dendrocryphaea lechleri, Leptostomum menziesii, Lepyrodon patagonicus, Porothamnium panduraefolium, Symblepharis krausei, and Zygodon papillatus.

The reserve is home to one of the northernmost populations of monito del monte (Dromiciops gliroides), a small marsupial which dwells in the mature forests of southern Chile and Argentina.

The reserve is surrounded by plantations of radiata pine (Pinus radiata), an introduced species that has replaced most of the coastal forest.

== Facilities ==
There is a reception area, several picnic tables and two footpaths.
