= Zehra (beetle) =

Scientific classification
- Kingdom: Animalia
- Phylum: Arthropoda
- Class: Insecta
- Order: Coleoptera
- Suborder: Polyphaga
- Infraorder: Cucujiformia
- Family: Cerambycidae
- Subfamily: Cerambycinae
- Tribe: Bimiini
- Genus: Zehra; Özdikmen, 2008

Synonyms
- Sibylla Thomson, 1858

Genus of beetles

Zehra is a genus in the longhorn beetle family Cerambycidae. There are about five described species in Zehra, found in Chile and Argentina.

== Species ==
These five species belong to the genus Zehra:

- Zehra coemeterii (Thomson, 1856) (Chile, Argentina)
- Zehra flavosignata (Fairmaire & Germain, 1859) (Chile)
- Zehra integra (Fairmaire & Germain, 1859) (Chile, Argentina)
- Zehra krahmeri (Cerda, 1973) (Chile)
- Zehra livida (Germain, 1900) (Chile)
