= Carolina Villagrán =

Chilean biologist

- Known for: Quaternary biogeography.
- Scientific career
- Fields: Biology
- Institutions: University of Göttingen

Carolina Villagrán Moraga is a Chilean biologist known for her work on Quaternary biogeography. Her works include models for the past extent of different altitudinal zonations in Chile and on the origin of the Chilean flora. She is part of the Faculty of Science for the University of Chile. In 2022, she was the subject of a conference in her honor. She has published 69 papers, which have garnered almost 5,000 citations.

== See also ==
- Arid Diagonal
- Claudio Donoso
- Ricardo Villalba
- Edmundo Pisano
- Valdivian temperate rain forest

== Sources ==
- ACADÉMICOS DEPARTAMENTO DE BIOLOGíA
- Publications
