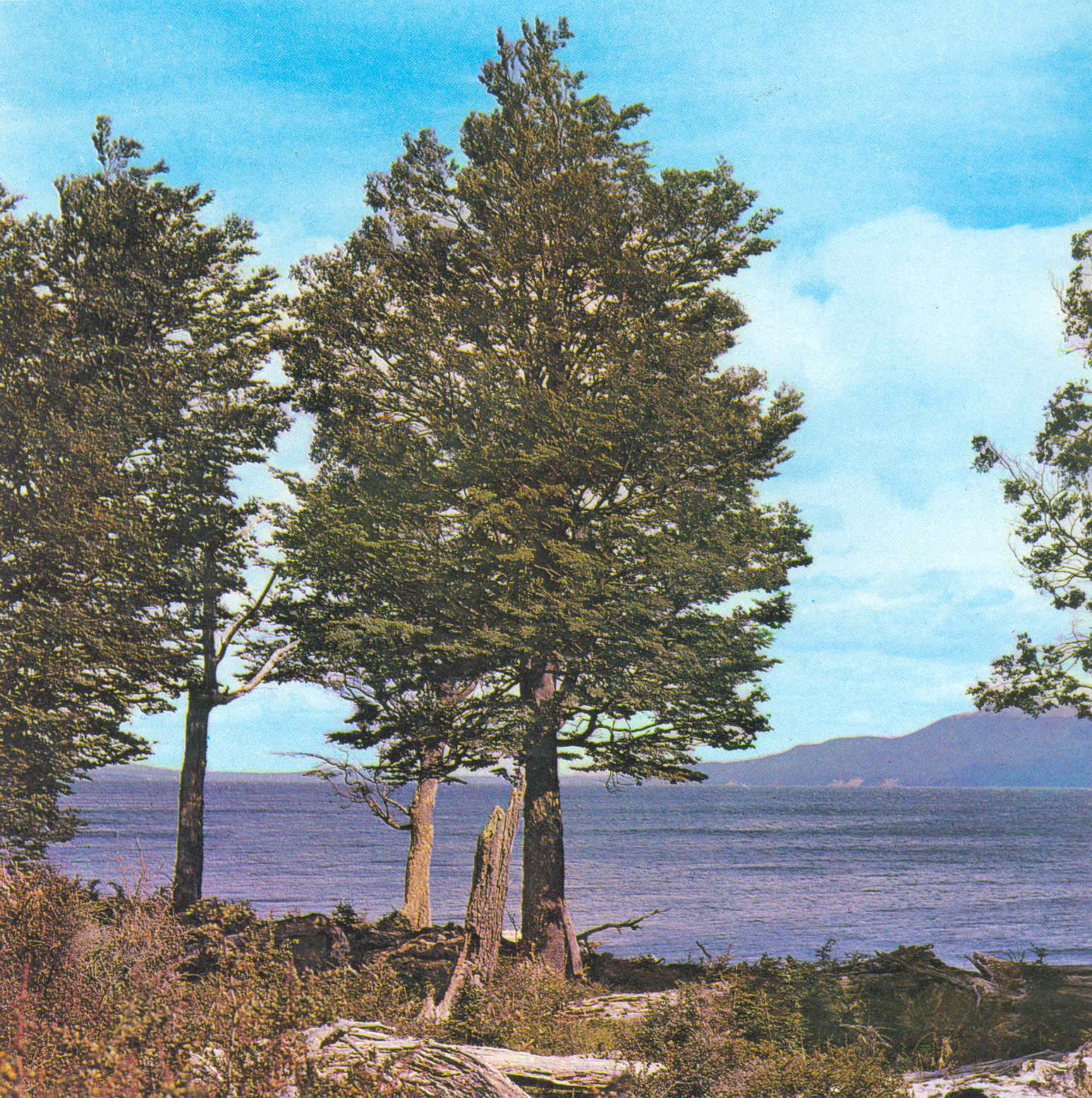

Conservation status
- Least Concern (IUCN 3.1)

Scientific classification
- Kingdom: Plantae
- Clade: Embryophytes
- Clade: Tracheophytes
- Clade: Spermatophytes
- Clade: Angiosperms
- Clade: Eudicots
- Clade: Rosids
- Order: Fagales
- Family: Nothofagaceae
- Genus: Nothofagus
- Subgenus: Nothofagus subg. Nothofagus
- Species: N. pumilio

Binomial name
- Nothofagus pumilio (Poepp. & Endl.) Krasser

Synonyms
- Fagus pumilio

= Nothofagus pumilio =

Species of plant

Nothofagus pumilio, the lenga beech (from the Mapuche language), is a deciduous tree or shrub in the Nothofagaceae family that is native to the southern Andes range, in the temperate forests of Chile and Argentina to Tierra del Fuego, from 35° to 56° South latitude. This tree is in the same genus as the coihue. It regenerates easily after fires. The wood is of good quality, moderate durability, and is easy to work with. It is used in furniture, shingles and construction and sometimes as a substitute for American black cherry in the manufacturing of cabinets.

== Description ==
The lenga beech can reach heights of up to 35 m (115 ft) and a trunk diameter of up to 1.7 m (5.6 ft). In southern Patagonia it grows to a height of up to 30 m (100 ft), and attains a trunk diameter of 1.5 m (4.9 ft). In more northern regions it grows only at heights above 1000 meters (3300 ft) in the form of a shrub. The leaves are dark green, elliptic toothed and 2–4 cm long, with irregularly lobed margins, and turn to yellow and reddish tones in autumn. The fruit is a small nut 4–7 mm long.

== Occurrence ==
The lenga beech can be found in the Torres del Paine National Park, Tierra del Fuego National Park, Los Alerces National Park and Nahuel Huapi National Park among other places. In its southerly range it occurs in dense stands as far south as Navarino Island. It grows in areas with low temperatures and abundant snow; therefore, in the north half of its distribution it is found only in the Andes Range and at sea level on its southernmost natural environment. It tolerates temperatures −30 °C (−22 °F) and lower, and frosts all seasons of the year.

== Gallery ==
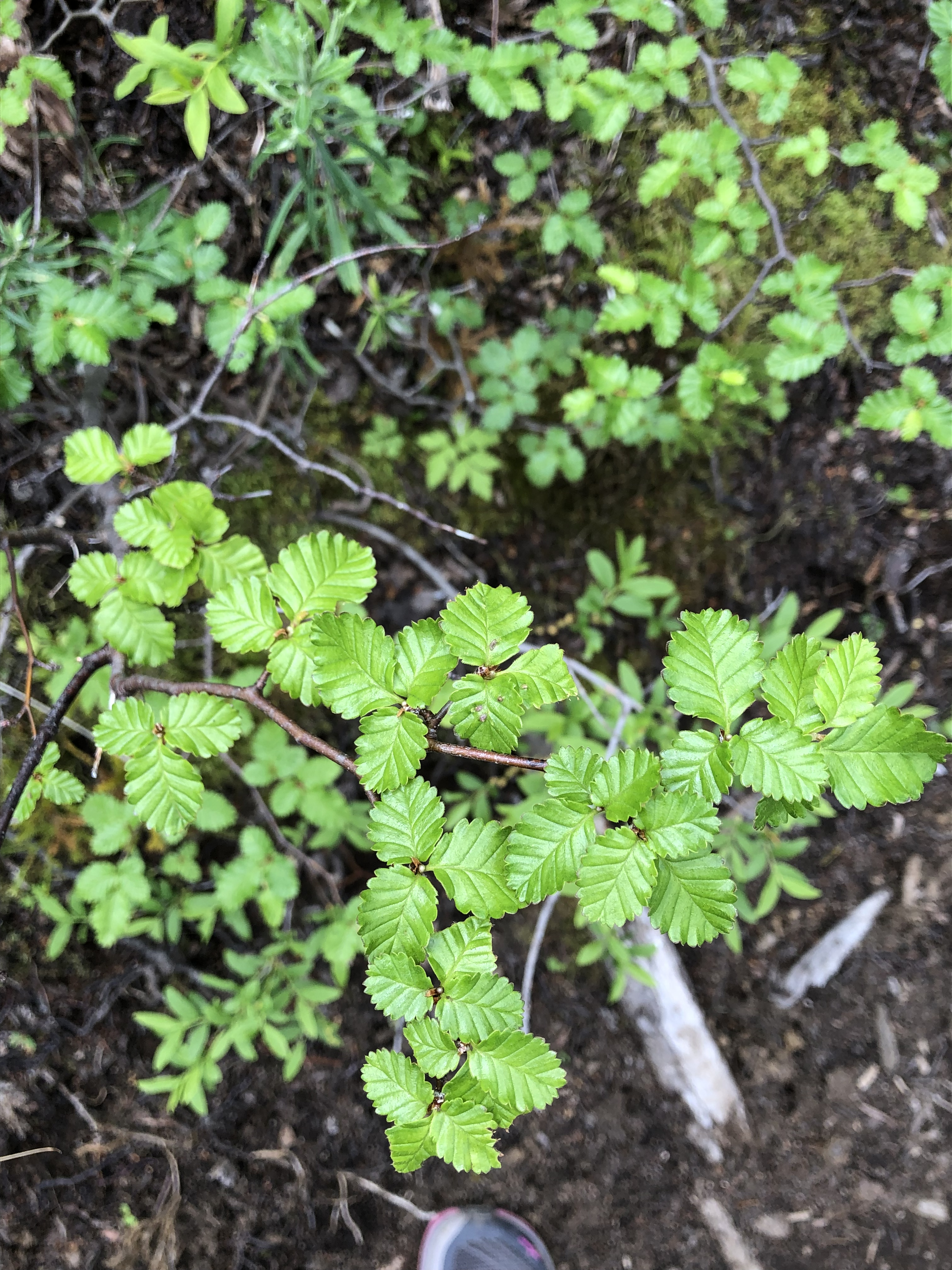
Summer leaves, Cerro Castillo reserve

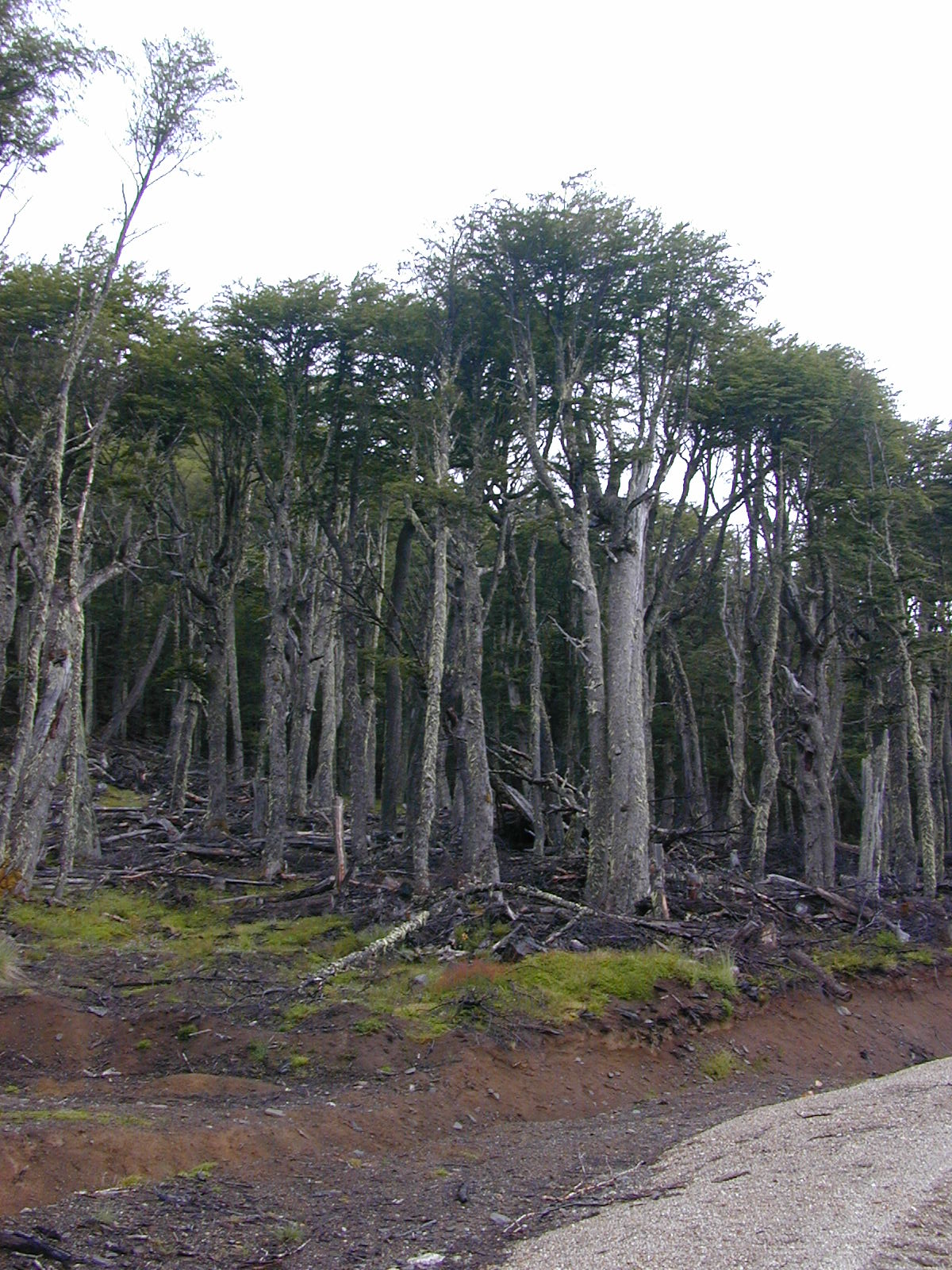
Lenga forest, Aysén Region, Chile

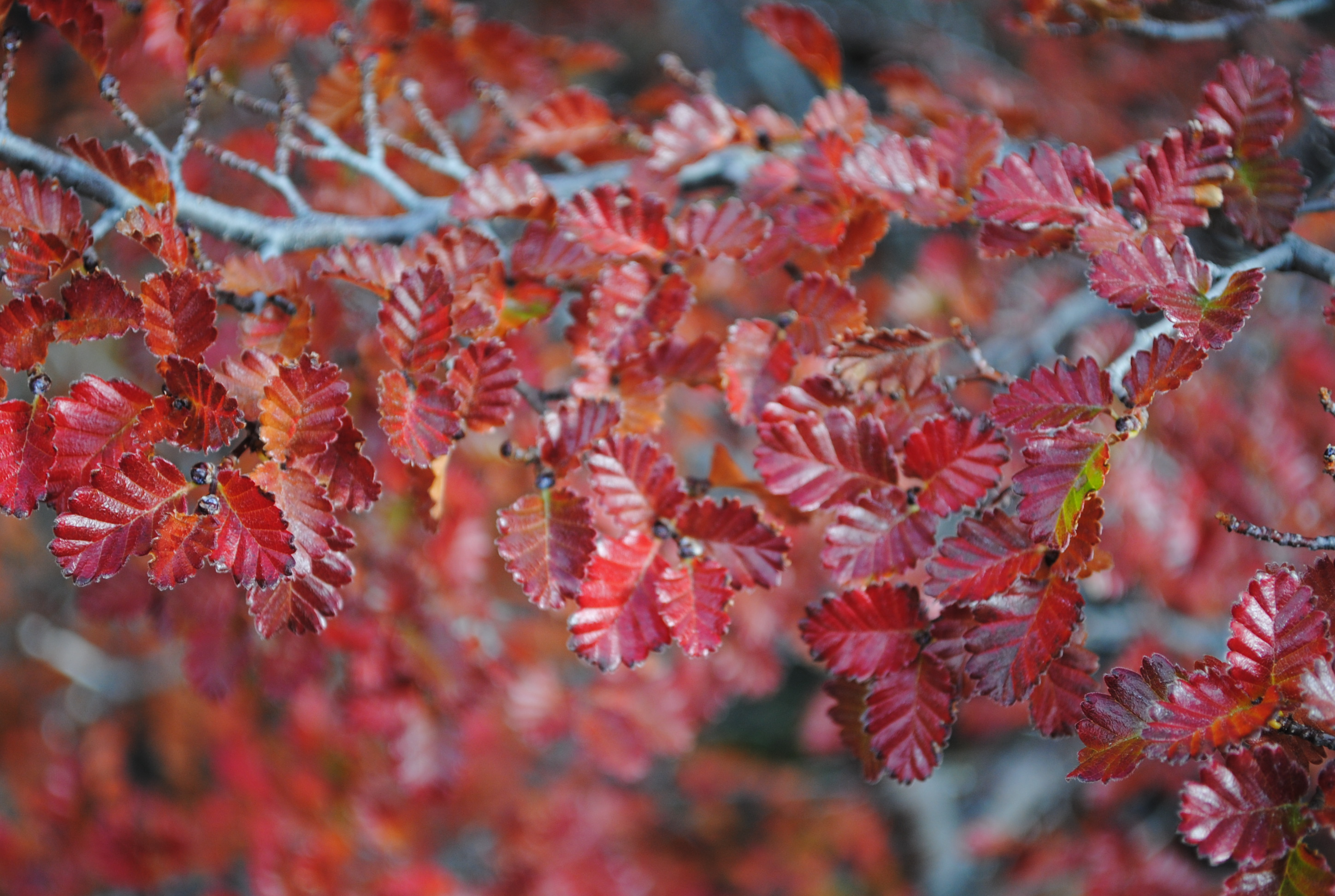
Fall lenga leaves, Cerro Catedral, Bariloche, Argentina

== Line notes ==
- C. Donoso. 2005. Árboles nativos de Chile. Guía de reconocimiento. Edición 4. Marisa Cuneo Ediciones, Valdivia, Chile. 136p.
- Adriana Hoffmann. 1998. Flora Silvestre de Chile, Zona Central. Edición 4. Fundación Claudio Gay, Santiago. 254p.
- C. Michael Hogan. 2008 Bahia Wulaia Dome Middens, Megalithic Portal, ed. Andy Burnham
- Rodríguez, R. & Quezada, M. 2003. Fagaceae. En C. Marticorena y R. Rodríguez [eds.], Flora de Chile Vol. 2(2), pp 64–76. Universidad de Concepción, Concepción.
- "Nothofagus pumilio". Chileflora.
- "Nothofagus pumilio". Enciclopedia de la Flora Chilena. Archived from the original on 2009-04-15.
