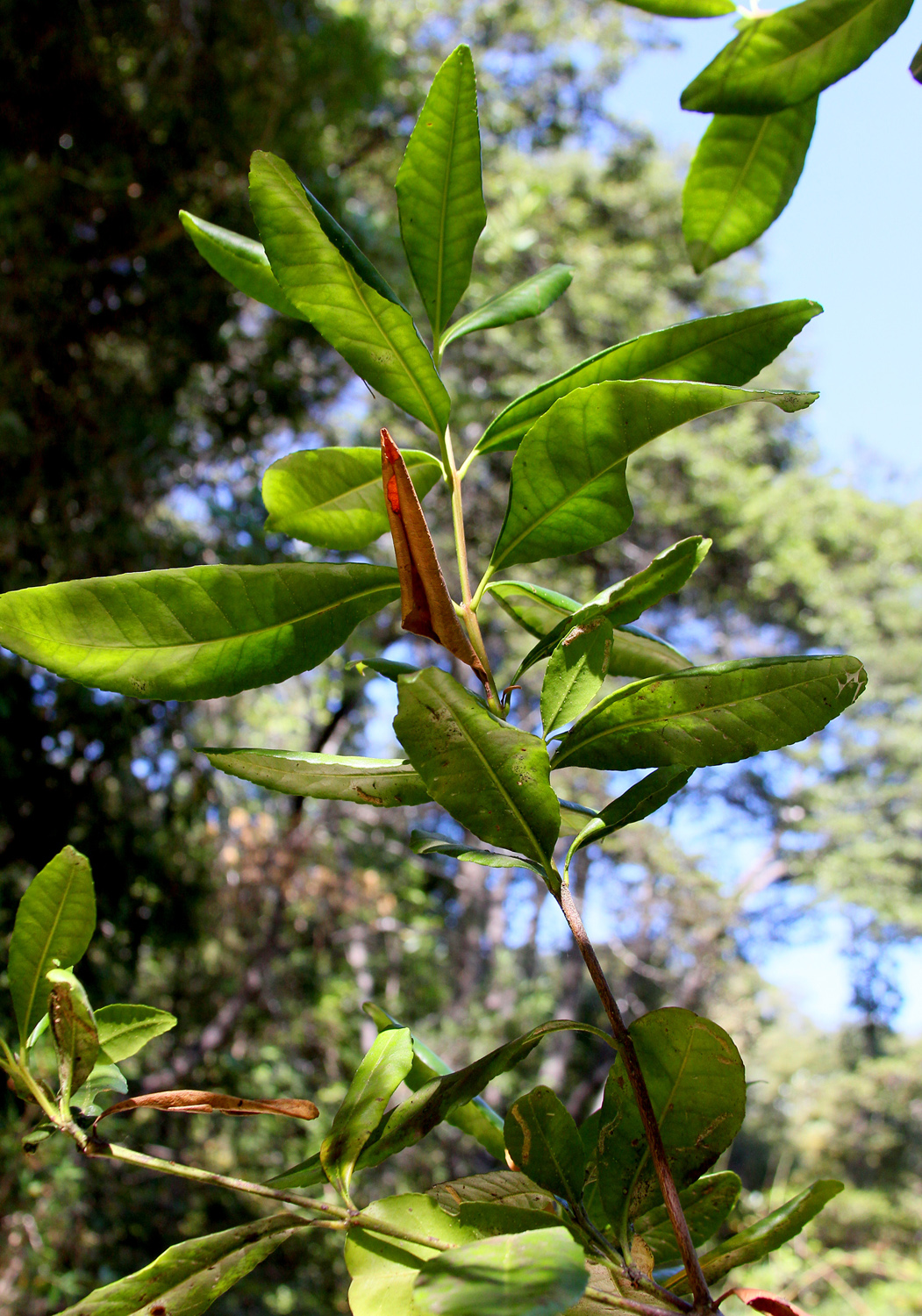
- Pitavia punctata

Scientific classification
- Kingdom: Plantae
- Clade: Tracheophytes
- Clade: Angiosperms
- Clade: Eudicots
- Clade: Rosids
- Order: Sapindales
- Family: Rutaceae
- Subfamily: Zanthoxyloideae
- Genus: Pitavia; Molina

= Pitavia =

Genus of plants

Pitavia is a genus of plants in the family Rutaceae. It contains the following species (but this list may be incomplete):

- Pitavia punctata (Ruiz & Pav.) Molina
