= Zehra integra =

Scientific classification
- Kingdom: Animalia
- Phylum: Arthropoda
- Class: Insecta
- Order: Coleoptera
- Suborder: Polyphaga
- Infraorder: Cucujiformia
- Family: Cerambycidae
- Subfamily: Cerambycinae
- Tribe: Bimiini
- Genus: Zehra
- Species: Z. integra

Binomial name
- Zehra integra (Fairmaire & Germain, 1859)

Synonyms
- Sybilla integra Fairmaire & Germain, 1859

Species of beetle

Zehra integra is a species in the longhorn beetle family Cerambycidae, found in Chile and Argentina.
