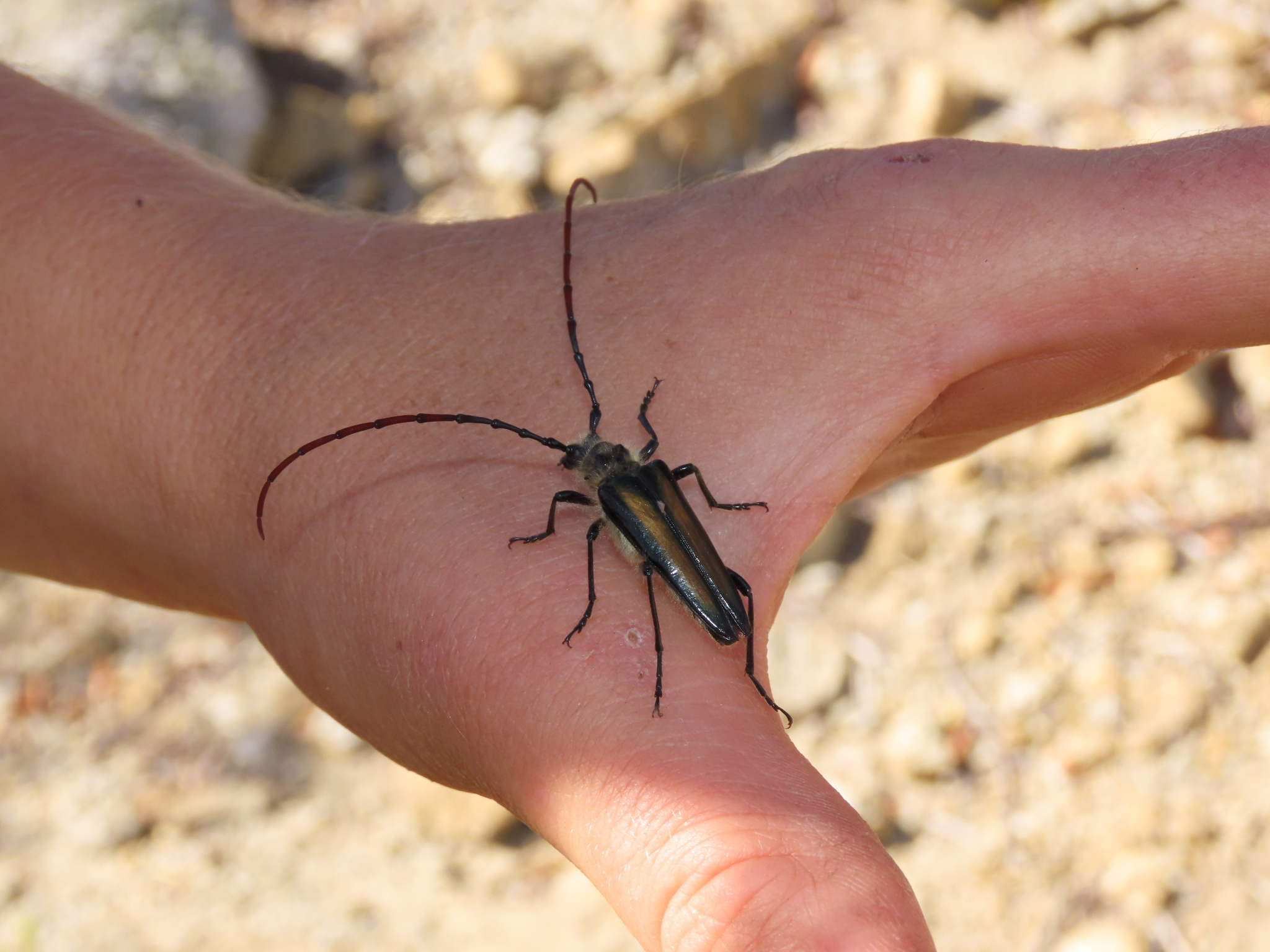
- Lautarus concinnus, Chile

Scientific classification
- Kingdom: Animalia
- Phylum: Arthropoda
- Class: Insecta
- Order: Coleoptera
- Suborder: Polyphaga
- Infraorder: Cucujiformia
- Family: Cerambycidae
- Tribe: Bimiini
- Genus: Lautarus; Germain, 1900
- Species: L. concinnus

Binomial name
- Lautarus concinnus (F. Philippi, 1859)

= Lautarus =

Genus of beetles

Lautarus is a genus in the longhorn beetle family Cerambycidae. This genus has a single species, Lautarus concinnus. It is known from southern Argentina and Chile.
