= Lola Hoffmann =

Chilean academic

Lola Hoffmann (also known as Helena Jacoby) (March 19, 1904 – April 30, 1988) was a German Jewish and Chilean physiologist and psychiatrist.

== Early life and education ==
Lola Hoffman was born Helena Jacoby in Riga, then part of the Russian Empire, to a well-off German-speaking Lutheran family of Jewish origin. Her father participated in the movement led by Alexander Kerenski. He was persecuted by the Bolsheviks, who occupied Latvia following the First World War. When Hoffmann was 15, her family moved to Freiburg in Breisgau, Germany. Hoffmann enrolled in the School of Medicine of Freiburg and stayed when her family decided to return to Riga.

== Career ==
=== Physiology ===
After finishing her thesis on the suprarenal glands of rats, Hoffmann left Freiburg and moved to Berlin, where she became an assistant of Paul Trendelenburg, who specialised in hormones. In 1931, she moved to Chile with her lover Franz Hoffman.

During her first year in Chile, she dedicated herself to learning Spanish and to immersing herself in Chilean culture. Hoffmann then worked at the Bacteriological Institute as her husband's assistant at the newly founded Institute of Physiology of the University of Chile. The couple researched, published papers, and travelled together. She would work at the Institute of Physiology from 1938 until her departure in 1951.

=== Psychiatry ===
After more than 20 years of experimental physiology study, Hoffmann began to lose interest in her profession and eventually developed depression. While traveling to Europe with her husband, she read the book The Psychology of C. G. Jung by Jolande Jacobi. After arriving in Zürich, she contacted Jacobi. Their talks, along with other experiences, led her to make the decision to abandon physiology and become a psychiatrist.

When Hoffmann returned to Chile, she began practicing psychoanalytic dream interpretation using her own dreams. Following this, she would go on to work at the Psychiatric Clinic of the University of Chile. In her explorative studies, she started practicing autogenic training, a method of self-hypnosis developed by the German neurologist, Johannes Heinrich Schultz. She also drew inspiration from the works of German psychiatrist, Ernst Kretschmer.

After 5 years working in the Psychiatric Clinic, Hoffman felt the need for more in-depth study. She applied for a fellowship in the Psychiatric Clinic of Tübingen, Germany. She remained in Tübingen for one year and then moved to Zurich for another year, where she attended the last conferences given by Jung. The ideas she picked up during these conferences would be key to her later work as a psychotherapist.

After returning to Chile in 1959, she rejoined the Psychiatric Clinic of the University of Chile, where she participated one of the first trials of group therapy and a controlled group experimentation with LSD and marijuana.

== Personal life ==
Lola Hoffmann, while conducting research, encountered Chilean doctor Franz Hoffmann, who was engaged in post-doctoral work in Physiology. Their collaboration blossomed into a romantic relationship, and in 1931, they relocated together to Chile. Lola's immediate family followed her to Chile in 1934.

In Chile, Hoffmann met Totila Albert, a Chilean sculptor and poet. Albert played a significant role in Hoffmann's transition into psychiatry, and they developed a close personal and romantic relationship that lasted for 17 years until Albert's death in 1967.

Throughout this period, Hoffmann remained married to Franz Hoffmann. She viewed Franz as her life partner but challenged the notion of exclusive pair relationships, considering them a hypocritical societal norm. Hoffmann believed that non-exclusive relationships were beneficial for the growth of individuals within a couple.

Lola and Franz Hoffmann continued to reside on the same family property on North Pedro de Valdivia Street in separate houses, maintaining regular communication and sharing meals.

Lola Hoffmann was an advocate for dismantling the patriarchal system, which she believed hindered the fulfillment of men and women. Influenced by Totila Albert, she held that the patriarchal structure impeded free and rewarding relationships between genders.

Totila Albert died in 1967. A few months later, Franz Hoffmann suffered a stroke, leading to paralysis on his right side and eventual total paralysis. Lola Hoffmann cared for him until his death 13 years later in 1981.

== Later years ==
Hoffman developed glaucoma when she was 60 years old. Her right eye was after numerous surgeries. Later, glaucoma developed in her previously healthy left eye, and she was soon almost blind, requiring a magnifying lens to read.

After 1964, Hoffmann became increasingly involved in Eastern meditation techniques and philosophy. She began practicing Hatha yoga, tai chi and psychodance. After reading Richard Wilhelm's German translation of the classic Chinese text, I Ching (The Book of Changes), she decided to write a Spanish translation of I Ching, which she completed in 1971.

She became gravely ill in 1983, five years before her death. During this time she had a religious experience which reaffirmed her faith in God.

Although Hoffmann believed in individual change, most of her life she avoided political action. However, she decided to join the Planetary Initiative for the World We Choose when it came to Chile in 1983. In fact, she was the main speaker at the first session held in Chile. During the final years of her life, she participated in several collective actions and she became a founding member of La Casa de la Paz in 1985.

Her last four years were spent in Peñalolén, a suburb of Santiago, on land belonging to her daughter, renowned botanist Adriana Hoffmann. They built a near-exact replica of her house on this property.

In her final years she frequently experienced altered states of consciousness. She continued seeing her patients, students, and friends up until the weeks before her death. Upon getting up one night, she fell and broke her hip. A few days later, at 84 years of age, she died in Santiago.
