= Phantazoderus =

Scientific classification
- Kingdom: Animalia
- Phylum: Arthropoda
- Class: Insecta
- Order: Coleoptera
- Suborder: Polyphaga
- Infraorder: Cucujiformia
- Family: Cerambycidae
- Subfamily: Cerambycinae
- Tribe: Bimiini
- Genus: Phantazoderus; Fairmaire & Fairmaire, 1864
- Species: P. frenatus

Binomial name
- Phantazoderus frenatus Fairmaire & Germain, 1864

Genus of beetles

Phantazoderus frenatus is a species of longhorn beetle in the Cerambycinae subfamily, and the only species in the genus Phantazoderus. The species was described by Léon Fairmaire and Jean-François Germain in 1864. It is known from Chile and southern Argentina. In flight, Phantazoderus frenatus is easily confused with species of Pyractomena, with which it shares coloration. Its rarity may be due to the density relationship with its model, as a remnant of Batesian mimicry.
