= Native Forest Law =

Chilean law

The Chilean Law on Native Forest Recovery and Forestry Development (Spanish: Ley de Recuperación del Bosque Nativo y Fomento Forestal) most often referred as the Native Forest Law (Ley de Bosque Nativo) is a law that regulates the use of native forests and is also aimed to promote sustainable forest management. The Native Forest Law is one of the Chilean laws that have been longest time in the parliament, from 1992 to 2007. It was promulgated in 2008.
