= Jurgen Rottmann =

Chilean ornithologist

Jürgen Rottmann
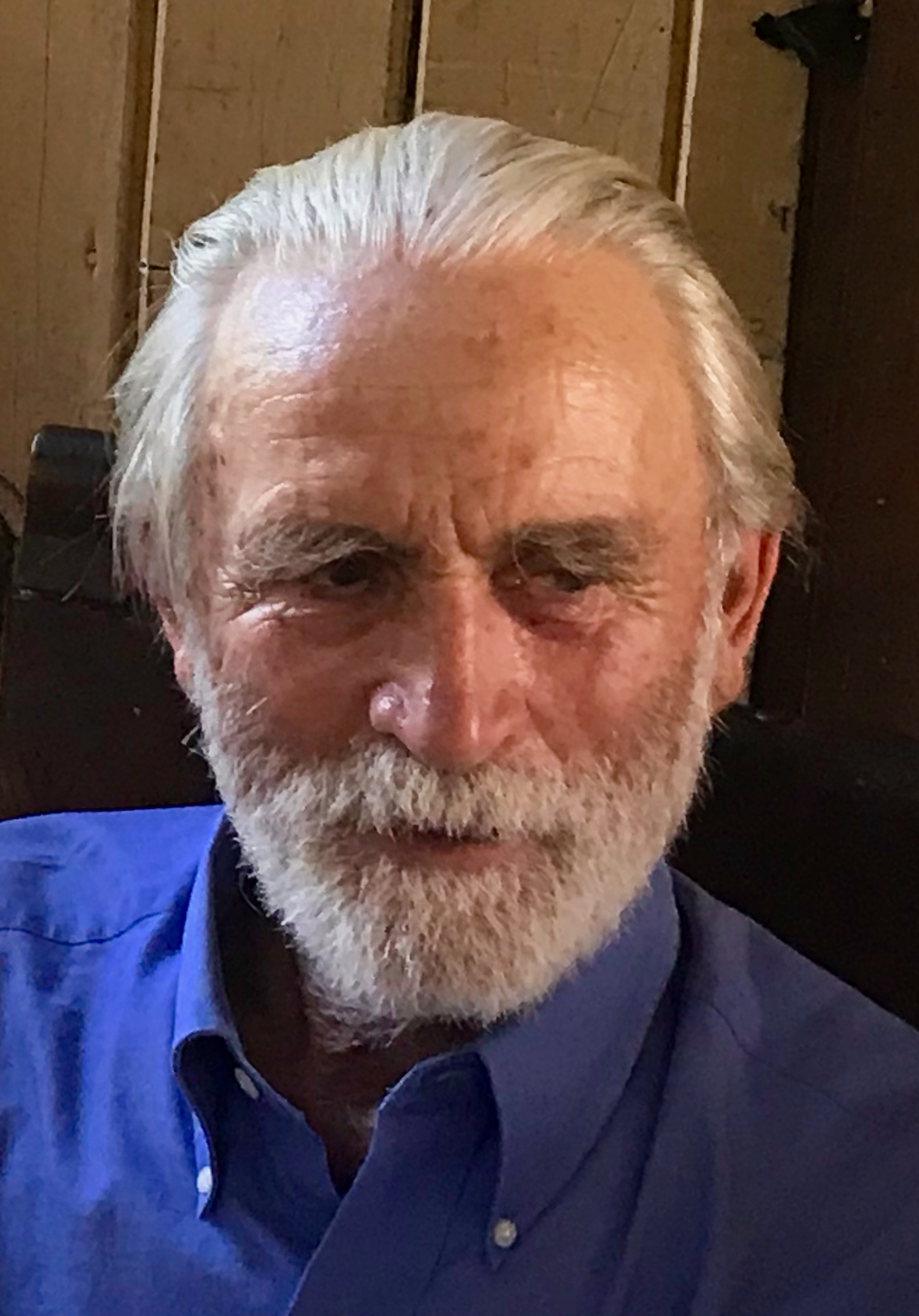
- Jürgen Rottmann in 2018
- Born: October 8, 1941 (age 84); Santiago, Chile
- Education: Universidad de Chile
- Title: Director: Chilean Union of ornithologist (UNORCH), Founder: Chilean Raptor rehabilitation Centre (CRAR) and Scientific Director: Gaviotin Chico Sustainability Foundation. Also known as "the David Attenborough of Chile"

Jürgen Rottmann (born October 8, 1941) is a Chilean ornithologist and conservationist. He is a founding member of the Chilean Committee for the Defence of Flora and Fauna and director of the Chilean Union of Ornithologists. He is the founder of the Raptor Rehabilitation Center located at his own farm in Talagante and scientific director of the Gaviotin Chico Sustainability Foundation.

== Early life and career ==
Born in Santiago in 1941, Jurgen Rottmann is the son of the German immigrants Kurt Rottmann and Greta Sylvester. The middle sibling of two sisters: Katarina and Veronica Rottmann, he grew up in Las Condes when it was a rural area, now a borough of Santiago close to the Cordillera de los Andes. Married to Rebeca Chavez, his lifelong partner, with whom he has two daughters and two sons. Jürgen Rottmann showed marked interest in nature from a young age and studied veterinary sciences at University of Chile as the only option open to him to become a naturalist in Chile in the 1960s. In 1972 he became the director of the National Forest Corporation. Soon after assuming the directorship, he published the first list of endangered birds in Chile. In 1978 he extended the list to mammals. The revised list used as a starting point the report he presented at the North American Wildlife and Natural Resources Conference in 1973.

== Author of wildlife books ==
Jürgen Rottmann is the author and collaboration of numerous wildlife publications including a 1986 book about Chilean birds titled "Aves de Chile", where he a collaborated with the photographer Thomas Daskam. He also authored a Chilean wildlife series published in 1995. In 1989, 300 copies of his book Bosques de Chile were donated to the Biblioteca Nacional de Chile. The book and its detailed description of the Chilean forest was the result of extensive travel to remote locations in Chile. His 1990 bilingual book The Chilean Altiplano in collaboration with the wildlife photographer Nicolás Piwonka, was also donated to the Chilean National Library. Earnings from sales of the book were donated to the World Wide Fund for Nature.

== Promotion of environmental awareness ==
Jürgen Rottmann was part of the team of the nature documentary La Tierra en que Vivimos , made in Chile by the Televisión Nacional de Chile shown in the 1980s. Also during the eighties, the Chilean newspaper El Mercurio published a popular Sunday column titled "Chile: cosas de mirar" with text by Jürgen Rottmann and photography by his friend Thomas Daskam. The National Geographic Magazine called Jürgen Rottmann "the David Attenborough of Chile" in a featured article about is conservation efforts as the Director of the Gaviotin Chico Sustainability Foundation. The foundation is dedicated to the preservation of the tiny desert bird called Gaviotin Chico or Peruvian Tern whose habitat is the coastline from northern Chile to Peru where the Atacama Desert meets the Humboldt Current at the Pacific Ocean. Jürgen Rottmann won the Premio Naturaleza Ladera Sur in 2023, an award given to people who have dedicated their lives to educate, raise awareness and promote the care of nature and the environment in Chile, the same year he participated in a nature conservation podcast series talking about his lifelong conservation efforts. and in an interview about the behaviour of urban birds. The environmental non-profit Fundación Frente de RIO awarded him a price for his lifelong conservation work in November 2025.
