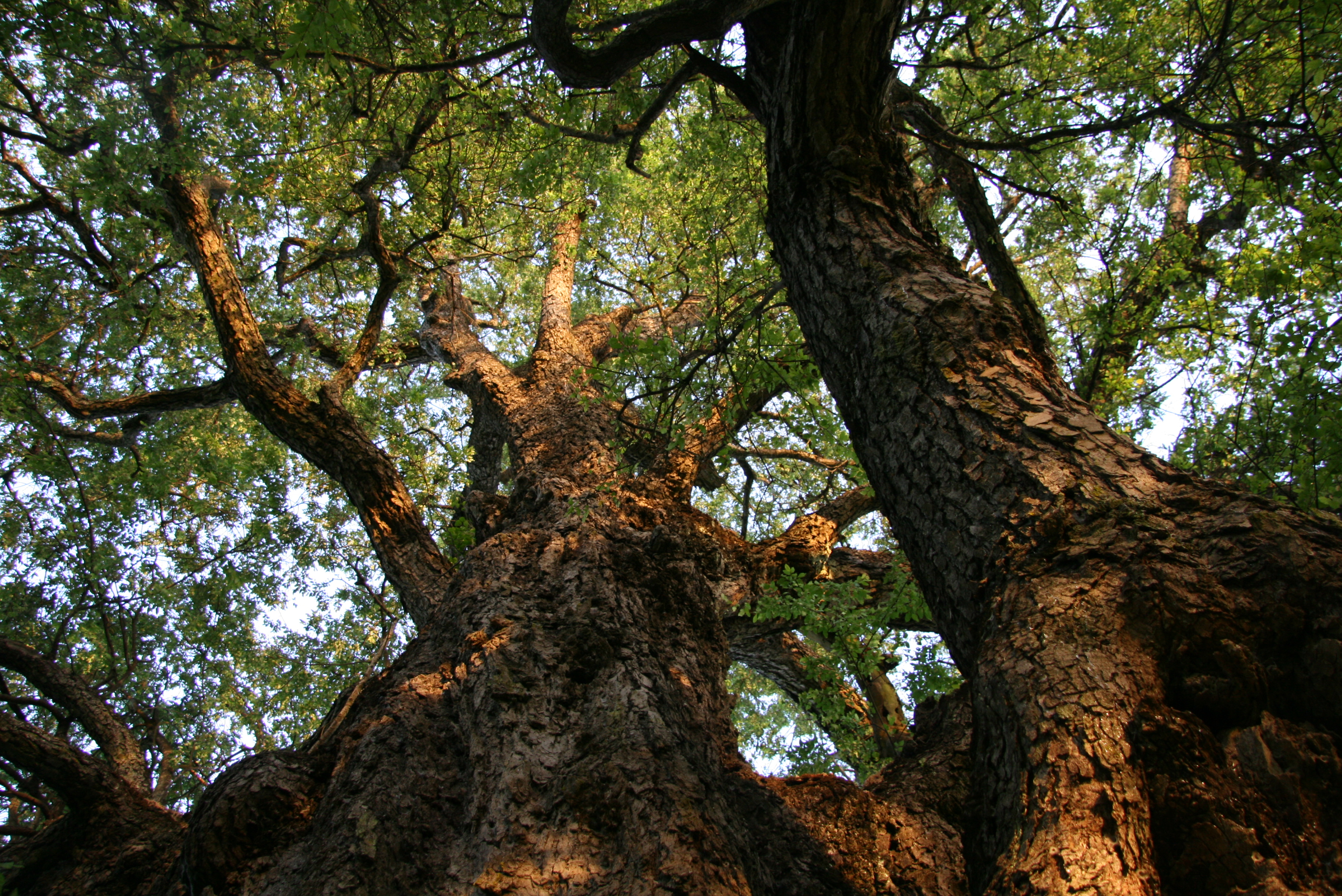

Conservation status
- Least Concern (IUCN 3.1)

Scientific classification
- Kingdom: Plantae
- Clade: Embryophytes
- Clade: Tracheophytes
- Clade: Spermatophytes
- Clade: Angiosperms
- Clade: Eudicots
- Clade: Rosids
- Order: Fagales
- Family: Nothofagaceae
- Genus: Nothofagus
- Subgenus: Nothofagus subg. Lophozonia
- Species: N. obliqua

Binomial name
- Nothofagus obliqua (Mirb.)Ørsted

Synonyms
- Lophozonia obliqua Fagus obliqua Lophozonia heterocarpa

= Nothofagus obliqua =

Species of plant

Nothofagus obliqua, commonly known as Patagonian oak, roble, pellín, roble pellín, and hualle in its early state of growth or roble beech, is a deciduous tree from Chile and Argentina. It grows from 33 to 43° south latitude. The northern extent of this tree's range in Chile is considered to be the Vizcachas Mountains and La Campana National Park. N. obliqua was proposed to be renamed Lophozonia obliqua in 2013.

== Description ==
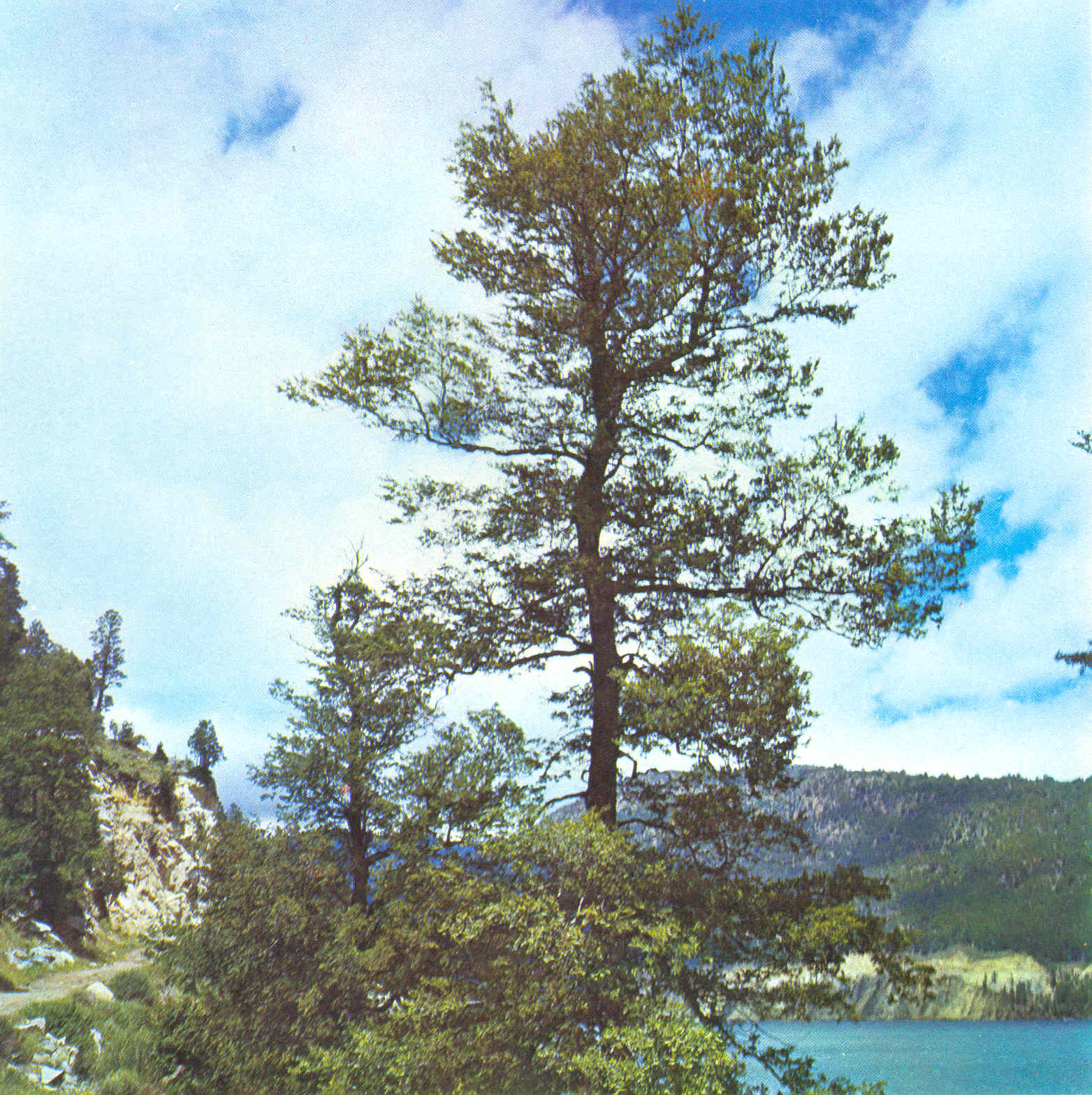
The Patagonian Oak is a montane species

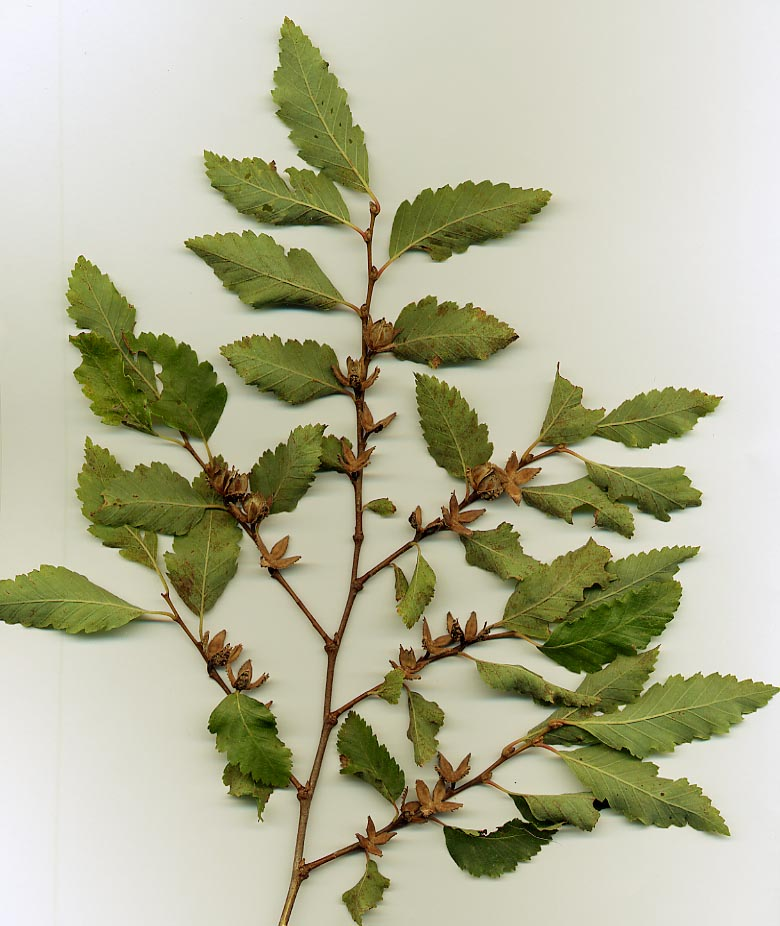
A shoot with leaves and cupules

Nothofagus obliqua reaches a height of 50 meters (175 ft) and 2 m (6.5 ft) diameter.

The trunk has greyish-brown to dark brown bark and is often forked. The leaves are alternate and somewhat curled between the veins and the serrated margin. The trees bear separate male and female flowers, both of which are small, surrounded by green bracts, and rather inconspicuous.

In Chile, young specimens (which have soft, yellowish wood) are known as roble hualle, while old trees, which have developed the reddish heartwood characteristic of mature specimens are known as roble pellín. The tree has a good shape and its timber is valued for its durability, being used for furniture-making and in construction.

== Cultivation and uses ==
The tree was introduced to the British Isles in 1849. Material with provenance from different places in its natural environment was tested in cultivation in Scotland. Trees cultivated from material collected from Ñuble, which is the provenance closest to the Equator, were the most damaged by frosts. Unfortunately seeds of that provenance were supplied to many commercial growers in the 1970s in the United Kingdom. Seeds sourced from Neuquen in Argentina proved the hardiest. A selection from Malleco, Chile, which is the provenance of the first trees planted in the British Isles also gave good hardiness results. It has also been planted on the North Pacific Coast of the United States.

Experimental plantations established in Wales suffered severe damage during the 1981–1982 cold wave that swept through Britain.

== Subspecies ==
There are two recognised subspecies of N. obliqua. These are:

- Nothofagus obliqua subsp. andina (F.M.Vazquez & R.A.Rodr.)
- Nothofagus obliqua subsp. valdiviana (Phil.) Heenan & Smissen.

Nothofagus macrocarpa was once also considered a subspecies, as Fagus obliqua var. macrocarpa.

== Hybrids ==
- Nothofagus obliqua hybridises with Nothofagus alpina to form the hybrid species Nothofagus × dodecaphleps., and with Nothofagus glauca to create the interspecific hybrid Nothofagus × leoni.
