= Zehra coemeterii =

Scientific classification
- Kingdom: Animalia
- Phylum: Arthropoda
- Class: Insecta
- Order: Coleoptera
- Suborder: Polyphaga
- Infraorder: Cucujiformia
- Family: Cerambycidae
- Genus: Zehra
- Species: Z. coemeterii

Binomial name
- Zehra coemeterii (Thomson, 1856)

Synonyms
- Sybilla coemeterii (Thomson, 1858)

Species of beetle

Zehra coemeterii is a species in the longhorn beetle family Cerambycidae, found in Chile and Argentina.
