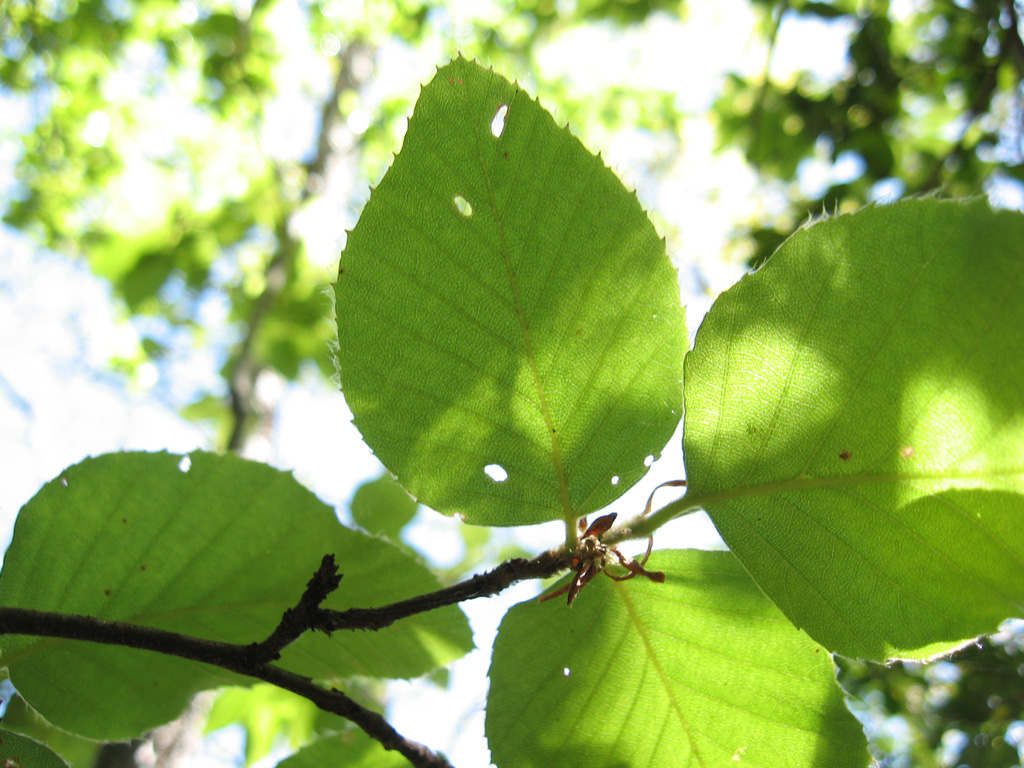

Conservation status
- Endangered (IUCN 3.1)

Scientific classification
- Kingdom: Plantae
- Clade: Embryophytes
- Clade: Tracheophytes
- Clade: Angiosperms
- Clade: Eudicots
- Clade: Rosids
- Order: Fagales
- Family: Nothofagaceae
- Genus: Nothofagus
- Subgenus: Nothofagus subg. Fuscospora
- Species: N. alessandrii

Binomial name
- Nothofagus alessandrii Espinosa (1926)

Synonyms
- Fuscospora alessandrii (Espinosa) Heenan & Smissen (2013)

= Nothofagus alessandrii =

Species of plant

Nothofagus alessandrii, commonly known as the ruil, is a species of plant in the family Nothofagaceae, it is also known as the southern beeches. It is endemic to Chile, occurring chiefly in the Chilean matorral ecoregion. It is threatened by habitat loss. The species is protected within Los Ruiles National Reserve.

== Description ==
This is a deciduous tree with a straight, gray trunk that can measure up to 30 metres tall. Its leaves are ovate, ovate-cordate or lanceolate in shape, with conspicuous primary veins and serrated edges. The greenish flowers are unisexual and inconspicuous.

== Range and habitat ==
The ruil grows between 37º 05' and 37º 50' south latitude, in the Chilean Coast Range (Cordillera de la Costa) in Talca and Cauquenes provinces of Maule Region. The species' estimated extent of occurrence (EOO) is 755 km^{2} (292 sq mi), and its area of occupancy (AOO) is 116 km^{2} (45 sq mi). It is a characteristic tree of the Maulino forest plant community, which is transitional between the Mediterranean-climate Chilean matorral of Central Chile and the mild temperate and humid Valdivian temperate forests of southern Chile. Present-day ruil forests grow in an area that is climatically homogeneous.

The ruil tend to form pure stands. The species grow often in the same places where hualo (Nothofagus glauca) can be found.

== Ecology ==
In its natural habitat N. alessandrii forms a symbiotic relationship with the ectomycorrhizal fungus Cenococcum geophilum, which helps the trees survive drought stress.

== Conservation ==
The current populations are considered remnants of what was once a larger and more continuous range. According to a 1988 study, the species is scattered in about 185 land-holdings, each of which have one or two hectares. These enclaves are surrounded by commercial plantations of Pinus radiata (an introduced species), and agricultural croplands and livestock for survival, hindering the expansion of its habitat.

The pine plantations are susceptible to wildfires, which can be worsened by the effects of climate change. Wildfire is considered the current greatest threat to the species. The 2017 Chile wildfires decreased the species' area of occupancy by 45%, and devastated the population at Piedra del Montaña.

Los Ruiles National Reserve, which consists of two separate areas totaling 45 ha, was created to protect one of the species' largest remaining forest habitats.

== Hybrids ==
- Ruil hybridises with the red beech tree (Nothofagus fusca) from New Zealand to form the hybrid species Nothofagus × eugenananus.

== Sources ==
- C. Michael Hogan & World Wildlife Fund. 2013. Chilean matorral. ed. M.McGinley. Encyclopedia of Earth. National Council for Science and the Environment. Washington DC
