= Nothofagus × leoni =

Scientific classification
- Kingdom: Plantae
- Clade: Tracheophytes
- Clade: Angiosperms
- Clade: Eudicots
- Clade: Rosids
- Order: Fagales
- Family: Nothofagaceae
- Genus: Nothofagus
- Subgenus: Nothofagus subg. Lophozonia
- Species: N. × leoni

Binomial name
- Nothofagus × leoni Espinosa (1926)

Synonyms
- Nothofagus leonii

Species of flowering plant

Nothofagus × leoni is a hybrid tree in the family Nothofagaceae. It is a naturally occurring interspecific hybrid of Nothofagus glauca and Nothofagus obliqua which is endemic to central Chile. It is a characteristic tree of the Maulino forest, a plant community of the Chilean Coast Range.
