= Edmundo Pisano =

Edmundo Pisano Valdés
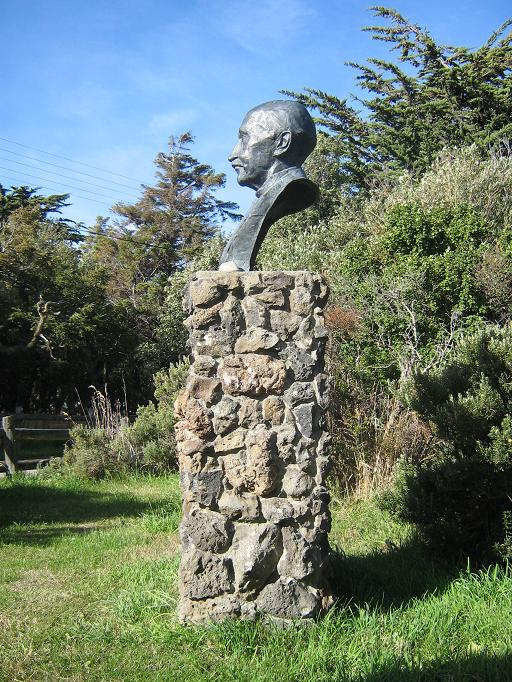
- Bust of Edmundo Pisano at University of Magallanes
- Born: 19 May 1919; Punta Arenas, Chile
- Died: 29 March 1997 (aged 77); Santiago, Chile
- Education: University of Chile
- Scientific career
- Fields: Plant ecology, botany, agronomy
- Workplaces: Instituto de la Patagonia
- Author abbrev. (botany): Pisano

Edmundo Pisano Valdés (19 May 1919 – 29 March 1997) was a Chilean plant ecologist, botanist and agronomist. Born in Punta Arenas in Chile's far south, Pisano studied agronomy at the University of Chile. In the late 1960s he returned to Punta Arenas. Initially he intended to work on in agriculture but eventually he ended up doing research at Instituto de la Patagonia which he founded together with Mateo Martinic and others.

The standard author abbreviation "Pisano" is used to indicate this person as the author when citing a botanical name.
