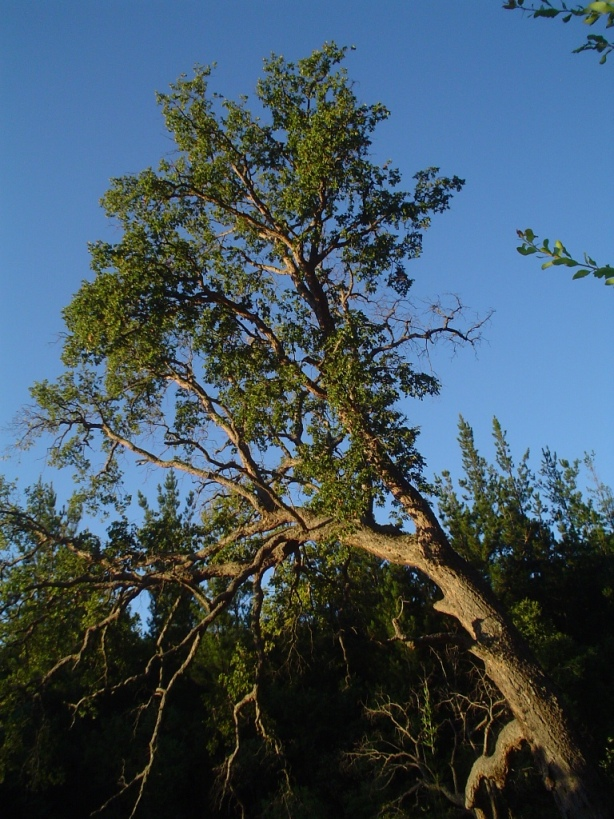

Conservation status
- Vulnerable (IUCN 3.1)

Scientific classification
- Kingdom: Plantae
- Clade: Embryophytes
- Clade: Tracheophytes
- Clade: Spermatophytes
- Clade: Angiosperms
- Clade: Eudicots
- Clade: Rosids
- Order: Fagales
- Family: Nothofagaceae
- Genus: Nothofagus
- Subgenus: Nothofagus subg. Lophozonia
- Species: N. glauca

Binomial name
- Nothofagus glauca (Phil.) Krasser (1896)

Synonyms
- Fagus glauca Phil. (1858); Lophozonia glauca (Phil.) Heenan & Smissen (2013); Nothofagus megalocarpa Reiche (1909)

= Nothofagus glauca =

Species of plant

Nothofagus glauca, commonly known as hualo or roble Maulino, is a species of plant in the family Nothofagaceae. It is a deciduous tree endemic to Chile. It grows from 34° to 37° South latitude. It is a typical tree of the maritime mediterranean-climate Maulino forest of Central Chile, its current range spanning over 330 km from north to south. The species grows on a variety of soils and is mostly found on gentle to steep slopes.

== Description ==
Nothofagus glauca grows up to 30 m (100 ft) height and 2 m (6.5 ft) diameter, with a straight and cylindrical trunk. The bark is gray-reddish and rough. It lives in places with long droughts. It is very useful for reforesting areas with very bent slopes and with long dry season in summer. It is threatened by habitat loss.

Leaves alternate, petioles 2–7 mm long, aovate, base subcordate, both faces with glands giving to them harsh texture, glaucous above, undulate margins, irregularly serrate. lamina twisted 5–9 cm, notorious pinate venation.

Flowers unisexual, small; male solitary, pedicels up to 1 cm, 50 stamens; female flowers in 3 in inflorescences. Fruit cupule with 4 narrow valves, with three yellowish nuts 12–20 mm long, pilose, the two lower triangular, tri-winged, and the internal flat and bi-winged.

== Taxonomy ==
Nothofagus glauca hybridizes with Nothofagus obliqua to create the naturally occurring interspecific hybrid Nothofagus × leoni.

N. glauca was proposed to be renamed Lophozonia glauca in 2013.
