= Claudio Donoso =

Chilean forester and academic (died 2021)

Claudio Donoso Zegers (died 22 March 2021) was a Chilean forester, teacher and professor emeritus at the Austral University of Chile in Valdivia. Donoso was among the first to define the different forest types of Chile when he released the book Tipos forestales de los bosques nativos de Chile in cooperation with CONAF in 1981. This typology became later official by its use in Chilean law. From 1980 to 1981 he was co-editor of Bosque, a forestry scientific journal published by the Austral University of Chile. He retired in 2000 becoming a professor emeritus.
