= List of southernmost items =

The most southerly geographical features of various types are listed here.

== Cities and settlements ==
Item	Place	Latitude/longitude
Capital (of an independent nation)	Wellington, New Zealand	41°17′20″S 174°46′38″E
Permanent settlement of any size	Amundsen–Scott South Pole Station, Antarctica	90°S 0°E
Settlement capable of housing more than 1,000 people	McMurdo Station, Antarctica	77°51′S 166°40′E
Hamlet (excluding research stations)	Puerto Toro, Chile	55°5′0″S 67°4′30″W
Town or city > 1,000 people	Puerto Williams, Chile	54°56′S 67°37′W
City > 50,000 people	Ushuaia, Argentina	54°48′S 68°18′W
City > 100,000 people	Punta Arenas, Chile	53°10′S 70°56′W
City > 150,000 people	Comodoro Rivadavia, Argentina	45°51′53″S 67°28′51″W
City > 250,000 people	Christchurch, New Zealand	43°31′48″S 172°37′13″E
City > 500,000 people	Mar del Plata, Argentina	38°00′S 57°33′W
Metropolitan area > 5,000,000 people	Melbourne, Australia	37°48′49″S 144°57′47″E
Metropolitan area > 15,000,000 people	Buenos Aires, Argentina	34°36′12″S 58°22′54″W
Metropolitan area > 20,000,000 people	São Paulo, Brazil	23°33′06″S 46°38′01″W

== Geography ==
Item	Place	Latitude/longitude
Body of water (navigable)	Bay of Whales, Ross Sea	78°30′S 164°20′W
Land (excluding Antarctica)	Thule Island, South Georgia and the South Sandwich Islands	59°31′50″S 27°23′50″W
Continental land (excluding Antarctica)	Cape Froward, Magallanes, Chile	53°56′S 71°20′W
Continental Australia	South Point, Wilsons Promontory, Victoria	39°08′11″S 146°22′29″E
Continental Africa/Old World	Cape Agulhas, Western Cape, South Africa	34°50′0″S 20°0′0″E
Continental Asia	Tanjung Piai, Malaysia	1°15′58″S 103°30′39″E

=== Islands ===
Item	Place	Latitude/longitude
Any island (above sea level)	Deverall Island	81°28′S 161°54′E
Any island (with bare rock, not ice-covered)	Ross Island	77°50′S 166°40′E
Any size excluding Antarctica	Thule Island	59°27′S 27°18′W
Island > 10,000 km^{2} excluding Antarctica	Isla Grande de Tierra del Fuego, Argentina/Chile	55°02′S 56°27′W
Island > 100,000 km^{2}	South Island, New Zealand	46°40′S 169°00′E
Coral atoll	Elizabeth Reef, Australia	29°57′S 159°04′E

The southernmost point of Berkner Island is further south than any of these, but its bedrock lies entirely below sea level, with only its ice covering rising above.

== Nature ==
=== Animals ===
Item	Place	Latitude/longitude
Bird: South polar skua (Stercorarius maccormicki)	seen at the South Pole	90°S 0°E
Amphibian: Gray four-eyed frog (Pleurodema bufoninum)	Southern tip of South America	53°54′S 71°18′W
Mammal: Weddell seal (Leptonychotes weddellii)	Southern Ocean	80th parallel south
Land mammal: Olive grass mouse (Abrothrix olivacea)	Hornos Island, Chile	55°56′38.68″S 67°17′21″W
Marsupial: Patagonian opossum (Lestodelphys halli)	Estancia La Madrugada, Argentina	47°06′00″S 66°29′01″W
Reptile: Liolaemus magellanicus	Isla Grande de Tierra del Fuego	52°22′57″S 68°24′36″W
Insect: Antarctic midge (Belgica antarctica)	Refuge Islands	68°21′S 67°10′W
Fish: Gymnoscopelus nicholsi, Gymnoscopelus braueri, Electrona antarctica	Ross Sea	75th parallel south

=== Plants ===
Item	Place	Latitude/longitude
Flowering plants (in greenhouses)	Amundsen–Scott South Pole Station, Antarctica	90°00′S 139°16′W
Ferns (Blechnum penna-marina, naturally occurring)	Hornos Island, Chile	55°56′38.68″S 67°16′51″W
Grass and flowering plants (naturally occurring)	Terra Firma Islands, Antarctica	68°42′S 67°32′W
Trees (Nothofagus betuloides, naturally occurring)	Hornos Island, Chile	55°58′S 67°15′W
Conifers (Pilgerodendron uviferum, naturally occurring)	Tierra del Fuego, Chile	54°20′S 70°7′W
Palms (nikau (Rhopalostylis sapida), naturally occurring)	Chatham Islands, New Zealand	44°02′S 176°26′W

== Agriculture ==
Item	Place	Latitude/longitude
Cattle farm	Estancia Moat, Tierra del Fuego Province, Argentina	54°58′32″S 66°44′41″W
Cherry orchard	Los Antiguos, Santa Cruz Province, Argentina	46°32′30″S 71°39′20″W
Potato farm	Centro Experimental Kampenaike, Magallanes Region, Chile	52°37′59″S 70°32′41″W
Rice field	San Nicolás, Ñuble Region, Chile	36°30′12″S 72°12′44″W
Vineyard	Chile Chico, Aysén Region, Chile	46°32′00″S 71°41′16″W

== Education ==
Item	Place	Latitude/longitude
International Baccalaureate school	John McGlashan College, Dunedin, New Zealand	45°51′17″S 170°29′55″E
University	National University of Tierra del Fuego, Ushuaia, Argentina	54°48′57″S 68°19′04″W
Kindergarten	Puerto Williams, Chile	54°55′59″S 67°37′00″W
Secondary school	Puerto Williams, Chile	54°55′59″S 67°37′00″W
Primary school	Escuela Nº 38 "Presidente Raúl Ricardo Alfonsín", Esperanza Base, Antarctica	63°24′S 57°00′W

== Science and technology ==
Item	Place	Latitude/longitude
Astronomical observatory	South Pole Telescope, Antarctica	90°S 0°E
Permanent scientific research station	Amundsen–Scott South Pole Station, Antarctica	90°S 0°E
Planetarium	Tūhura Otago Museum, Dunedin, New Zealand	45°51′56″S 170°30′38″E
Nuclear power plant	Atucha I, Argentina	33°58′S 59°12′W
Nuclear power plant	Atucha II, Argentina	33°58′S 59°12′W

== Historical sites and archaeological findings ==
Item	Place	Latitude/longitude
Prehistoric archaeological site	Yaghan people's Cape Horn hunting camp, Chile.	55°58′19″S 67°15′50″W
Polynesian settlement/trans-oceanic navigation	The Auckland Islands are the southernmost known point of the Polynesian Triangle, and Austronesian expansion, and represent the most southerly pre-European voyages outside South America, across hundreds of kilometres of open ocean. Sandy Bay on Enderby Island is the most southerly known Polynesian settlement, although there is evidence of pre-modern human activity further south within the same archipelago including Adams Island.	50°32′S 166°02′W

== Transportation ==
Item	Place	Latitude/longitude
Airfield (permanent, no scheduled flights)	Jack F. Paulus Skiway at Amundsen-Scott South Pole Station, Antarctica	89°59′22″S 1°00′00″W
Seaport/Harbour	Winter Quarters Bay, McMurdo Station, Antarctica	77°51′S 166°40′E
Narrow gauge railway	Dumont d'Urville Station, Antarctica The record was previously held by a 1963 installed line at the British Antarctic Survey base at Signy Island.	66°40′S 140°01′E
Airport (permanent, with scheduled flights)	Guardiamarina Zañartu Airport, Puerto Williams, Chile	54°56′S 67°37′W
International airport	Ushuaia – Malvinas Argentinas International Airport, Ushuaia, Argentina	54°50′S 68°17′W
Traffic light	Hipólito Yrigoyen/Constitución Fueguina, Ushuaia, Argentina	54°49′42″S 68°20′04″W
Suspension bridge	Bodie Creek Suspension Bridge, Falkland Islands	51°51′14″S 59°01′04″E
Railway	Southern Fuegian Railway (Ferrocarril Austral Fueguino) from Ushuaia to the Tierra del Fuego National Park in Argentina	54°48′S 68°18′W
Electrified railway	Wellington station, Wellington, New Zealand	41°16′43″S 174°46′51″E
Metro station	Anzac railway station, Melbourne, Australia	37°49′59″S 144°58′20″E
Tramway system	Christchurch Heritage Tram, Christchurch, New Zealand	43°32′07″S 172°38′28″E (southernmost point of route)
Tramway system (as part of mass transit, excluding heritage routes)	Melbourne, Australia	37°54′52″S 145°1′0″E (southernmost point of route)
Trolleybus	Valparaíso, Chile	33°2′46″S 71°36′16″W

== Recreation ==
=== Sport ===
Item	Place	Latitude/longitude
Bowling club	Stewart Island Bowling Club, Oban, New Zealand	46°53′57″S 168°07′43″E
Ski resort	Cerro Castor, Tierra del Fuego Province, Argentina	54°43′S 68°00′W
Golf club	Ushuaia Golf Club, Ushuaia, Argentina	54°49′52″S 68°25′02″W
Racing Circuit	Teretonga Park, Invercargill, New Zealand	46°26′26″S 168°15′39″E
Rugby club	Ushuaia Rugby Club]	54°50′S 68°00′W

== Religious buildings ==
Item	Place	Latitude/longitude
Church (ice-made)	Chapel of Our Lady of the Snows, Belgrano II Base, Antarctica	77°52′S 34°37′W
Church (regular)	Trinity Church, Antarctica (Russian Orthodox Church), King George Island, Antarctica	62°12′S 58°58′W
Mormon church	Puerto Williams, Chile	54°56′S 67°37′W
Cathedral	El Sagrado Corazón, Diocese of Punta Arenas, Punta Arenas, Chile	53°10′S 70°56′W
Hindu temple	Centro Cultural y Templo Hindu, Punta Arenas, Chile	53°10′S 70°56′W
Mosque	Southland Muslim Association, Invercargill, New Zealand	46°24′35″S 168°23′20″E
Synagogue	Dunedin Synagogue, Dunedin, New Zealand	45°52′S 170°30′E
Buddhist stupa	the Enlightenment Stupa at Portobello, Dunedin, New Zealand	45°51′S 170°39′E
Sikh Gurdwara	Dunedin Gurdwara Singh Sabha Trust, former Forbury Park Raceway, Dunedin, New Zealand	45°54′26.72″S 170°29′47.30″E

== Shops and service facilities ==
Item	Place	Latitude/longitude
Tourist office	Puerto Williams, Chile	54°55′59″S 67°37′00″W
Restaurant	Lodge Lakutaia, Puerto Williams, Chile	54°56′12″S 67°36′47″W
Cinema	Jubany Base, Antarctic Peninsula	62°14′S 58°40′W
Public post office	Port Lockroy, Goudier Island, Antarctica	64°49′S 63°30′W
Bar	Faraday Bar, Vernadsky Research Base, Antarctica	65°14′45″S 64°15′27″W
Automated teller machine	McMurdo Station, Antarctica	77°51′S 166°40′E

=== International brand names ===
Item	Place	Latitude/longitude
Mercedes-Benz retailer	Mario Bonetto Rodados y Servicios, Ushuaia, Argentina	54°48′05″S 68°17′06″W
Toyota retailer	Celentano Motors, Ushuaia, Argentina	54°47′30″S 68°14′12″W
Volkswagen retailer	Ushuaia, Argentina	54°47′27″S 68°14′25″W
Mobil petrol station	Invercargill, New Zealand	46°25′46″S 168°21′42″E
Tesla retailer	Wigram, Christchurch, New Zealand	43°32′44″S 172°33′34″E
H&M	Christchurch Central, Christchurch, New Zealand	43°32′00″S 172°38′16″E
Shell petrol station	Blackmans Bay, Tasmania, Australia	43°00′00″S 147°19′13″E
Aldi	Wonthaggi, Victoria, Australia	38°36′15″S 145°35′34″E
7-Eleven	Rosebud, Victoria, Australia	38°21′25″S 144°54′04″E
Apple Store	Westfield Fountain Gate, Narre Warren, Victoria, Australia	38°1′7″S 145°18′15″E
ECCO	Moorabbin, Melbourne, Australia	37°58′15″S 145°05′21″E
IKEA	Springvale, Melbourne, Australia	37°55′36″S 145°08′36″E
Zara	Chadstone Shopping Centre, Malvern East, Melbourne, Australia	37°53′05″S 145°05′00″E

==== Franchised food brands ====
Item	Place	Latitude/longitude
Hard Rock Cafe	Ushuaia, Argentina	54°48′25″S 68°18′23″W
Domino's Pizza	Punta Arenas, Chile	53°08′20″S 70°53′23″W
KFC	Punta Arenas, Chile	53°08′05″S 70°52′32″W
Wendy's	Punta Arenas, Chile	53°07′54″S 70°54′34″W
Pizza Hut	Invercargill, New Zealand	46°25′40″S 168°21′41″E
Subway	Invercargill, New Zealand	46°25′40″S 168°21′42″E
McDonald's	Invercargill, New Zealand	46°25′15″S 168°21′41″E
Burger King	Invercargill, New Zealand	46°24′48″S 168°21′42″E
Starbucks	Invercargill, New Zealand	46°24′43″S 168°20′57″E
Taco Bell	Dunedin North, Dunedin, New Zealand	45°51′39″S 170°30′45″E
Denny's	Christchurch Central, Christchurch, New Zealand	43°32′25″S 172°38′21″E
Baskin-Robbins	Camberwell, Melbourne, Australia	37°49′50″S 145°03′24″E

== Gardens/parks, zoos and aquaria ==
Item	Place	Latitude/longitude
National park	Cabo de Hornos National Park, Tierra del Fuego, Chile	55°49′58″S 67°25′58″W
Penguin reserve	Magdalena Island Penguin Reserve, Magdalena Island, Magallanes Region, Chile	52°55′10″S 70°34′34″W
Aviary	Queens Park Aviary, Invercargill, New Zealand	46°24′13″S 168°21′37″E
Botanical garden	Jardín Botánico de Ushuaia, Ushuaia, Argentina	54°47′07″S 68°16′56″W

== Other ==
Item	Place	Latitude/longitude
UNESCO world heritage site (natural)	French Austral Land and Seas	90°00′S 45°00′E (southernmost point)
UNESCO world heritage site (cultural)	Cueva de las Manos, Argentina	47°09′S 70°40′W
Skyscraper (>100 m)	Majestic Centre, Wellington, New Zealand	41°17′19″S 174°46′27″E
Skyscraper (>150 m)	Capitol Grand, South Yarra, Australia	37°50′21.3″S 144°59′42.7″E
Opera house	Oamaru Opera House, Oamaru, New Zealand	45°05′55″S 170°58′13″E
High-rise building	Cue Building, Invercargill, New Zealand	46°24′40″S 168°20′57″E
Mine	Invierno mine, Riesco Island, Chile	52°52′12″S 71°37′31″W
Brewery	Cerveza Artesanal Beagle, Ushuaia, Argentina	54°47′24″S 68°15′57″W
Lighthouse	Monumental Cabo de Hornos, Hornos Island, Chile	55°57′54″S 67°13′12″W
Bell tower	Tokomairiro Presbyterian Church, Milton, New Zealand	46°07′22″S 169°57′25″E
Place of birth of a human	Esperanza Base, Antarctica (Emilio Marcos Palma in 1978 and seven others)	63°24′S 57°00′W
Cemetery	Buromskiy Island, Antarctica	66°32′S 93°00′E

== See also ==
- List of northernmost items
- Extreme points of Earth
- Extreme points of the Antarctic
