= Herschel Island (Chile) =

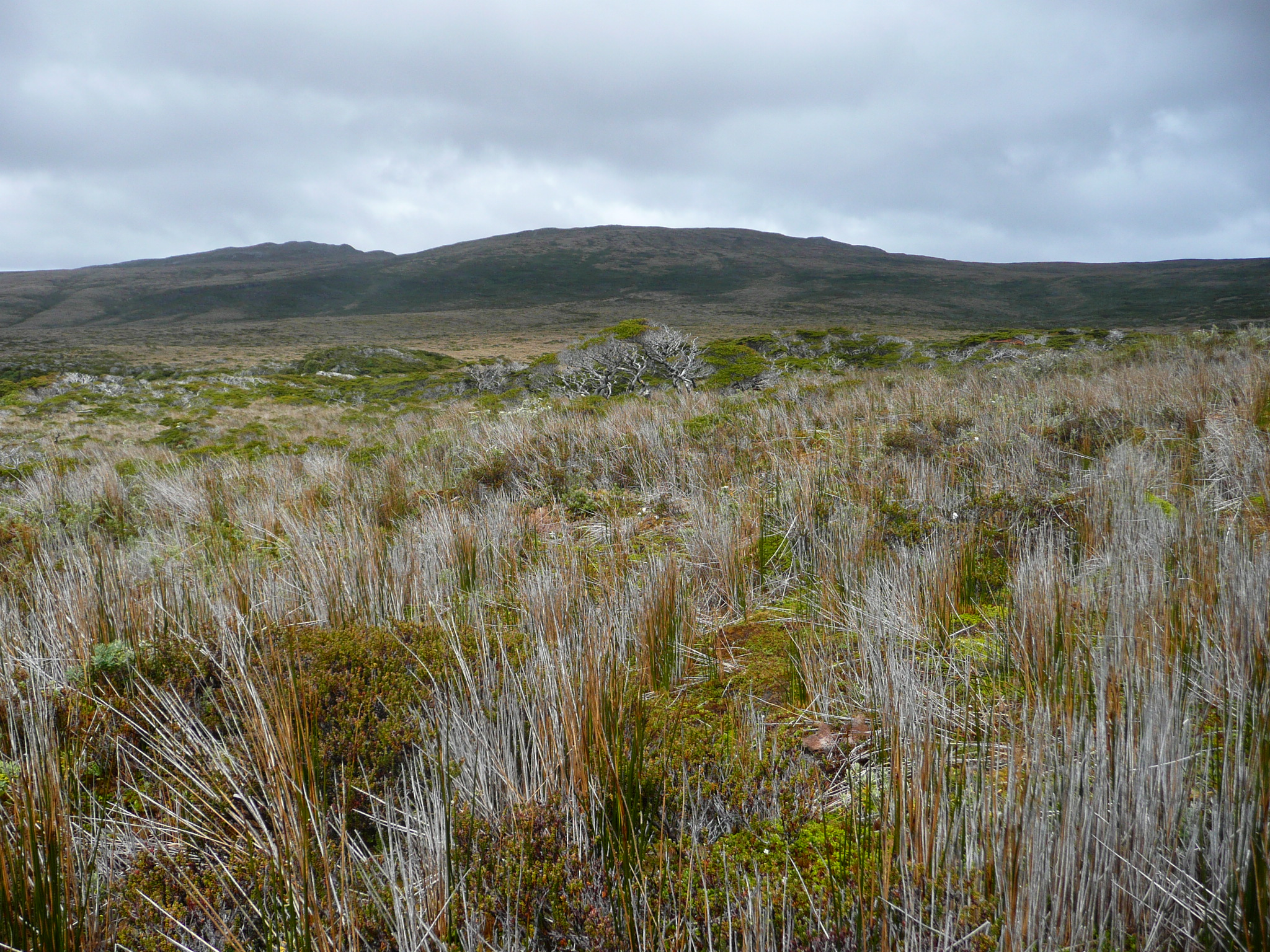
- Island landscape, the interior of the Cabo de Hornos National Park
- Interactive map of Herschel Island

Geography
- Location: Pacific Ocean, Atlantic Ocean
- Coordinates: 55.845°S 67.2953°W

Administration
- Chile

Herschel Island is an island belonging to Chile. The island is located just north of the Drake Passage and southeast of Tierra del Fuego. It is part of the Hermite Islands. The Franklin Channel on the north side of the island separates Herschel from the southernmost Wollaston Islands. Herschel Island is part of the Cabo de Hornos National Park.

It is one of the southernmost landforms in the Americas (Hornos Island is further south). The island was named in honor of the British astronomer John Herschel.
