= Herschel Island (disambiguation) =

Herschel Island may refer to:

- Herschel Island, an island in the Arctic's Beaufort Sea
- Herschel Island (Chile), a Chilean island near the Drake Passage
- Herschel Island (ship, 1956), see Boats of the Mackenzie River watershed
