= Horn Island =

Horn Island may refer to:

- Horn Island (Mississippi), United States
- Horn Island, Queensland, Australia

== See also ==
- Hoorn Islands, a group of two islands, Futuna and Alofi, in the Pacific Ocean, now part of Wallis and Futuna
- Hornos Island, in Antártica Chilena Province of Magallanes y Antártica Chilena Region, Chile
