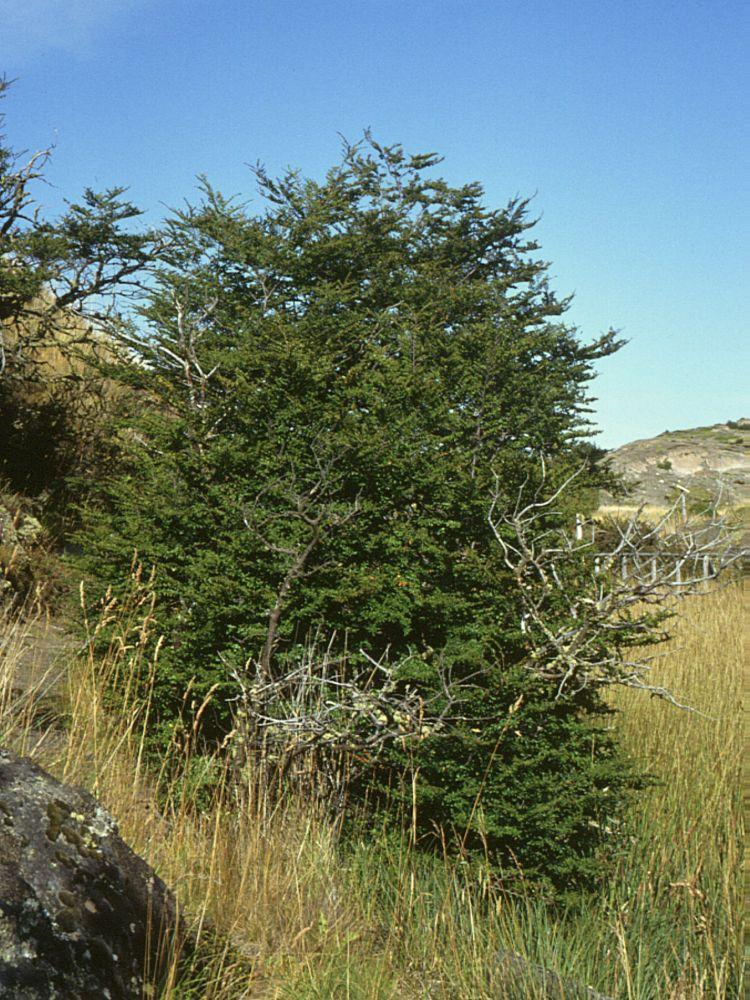
- Nothofagus antarctica in Torres del Paine National Park

Conservation status
- Least Concern (IUCN 3.1)

Scientific classification
- Kingdom: Plantae
- Clade: Embryophytes
- Clade: Tracheophytes
- Clade: Spermatophytes
- Clade: Angiosperms
- Clade: Eudicots
- Clade: Rosids
- Order: Fagales
- Family: Nothofagaceae
- Genus: Nothofagus
- Subgenus: Nothofagus subg. Nothofagus
- Species: N. antarctica

Binomial name
- Nothofagus antarctica (Forster) Oerst.

Synonyms
- Fagus antarctica

= Nothofagus antarctica =

Species of plant

Nothofagus antarctica (Antarctic beech; in Spanish Ñire or Ñirre) is a deciduous tree or shrub native to southern Chile and Argentina from about 36°S to Tierra del Fuego (56° S), where it grows mainly in the diminishing temperate rainforest.

Its occurrence on Hoste Island has previously earned it the distinction of being the southernmost tree on earth; however, in 2019 it was established that N. betuloides was found further south, on Hornos Island. N. antarctica is present on Hornos as well, but the southernmost individual is slightly further north (17 m) of the southernmost N. betuloides.

== Description ==
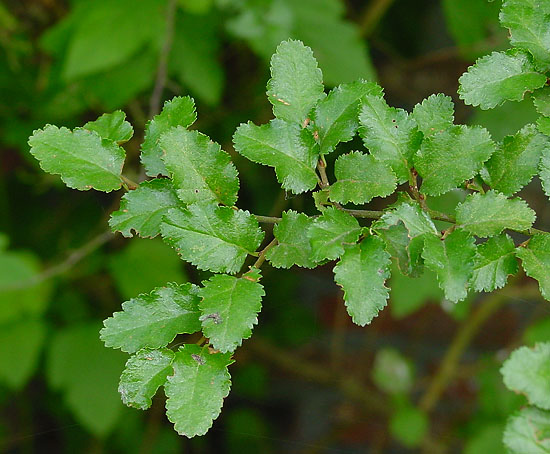
Foliage

Nothofagus antarctica typically grows 5–25 m (12–80 ft) tall and has a slender trunk with scaly bark. The leaves are simple and alternate, growing 2–4.5 cm long, and often viscid, with a sweetly scented wax. The leaf color is medium green, turning yellow to orange in the fall. The leaves are broadly ovate to triangular, crinkly, rounded at the tips, irregularly and minutely toothed.

The flowers are inconspicuous yellow-green catkins. The fruit is a 6 mm, very fragrant 4-valved capsule containing three small nuts.

== Cultivation ==
Nothofagus antarctica has been planted on the North Pacific Coast of the United States and in Great Britain where it thrives. Trees planted in the Faroes, which were imported directly from its southernmost distribution in Tierra del Fuego, have shown good hardiness.

NB: Lophozonia moorei, found in Australia, is also referred to as "Antarctic beech".
