= Hermite Islands =

Subantarctic islands of Chile

Native name: Islas Hermite or L'Hermite Samajani (Yahgan Language)
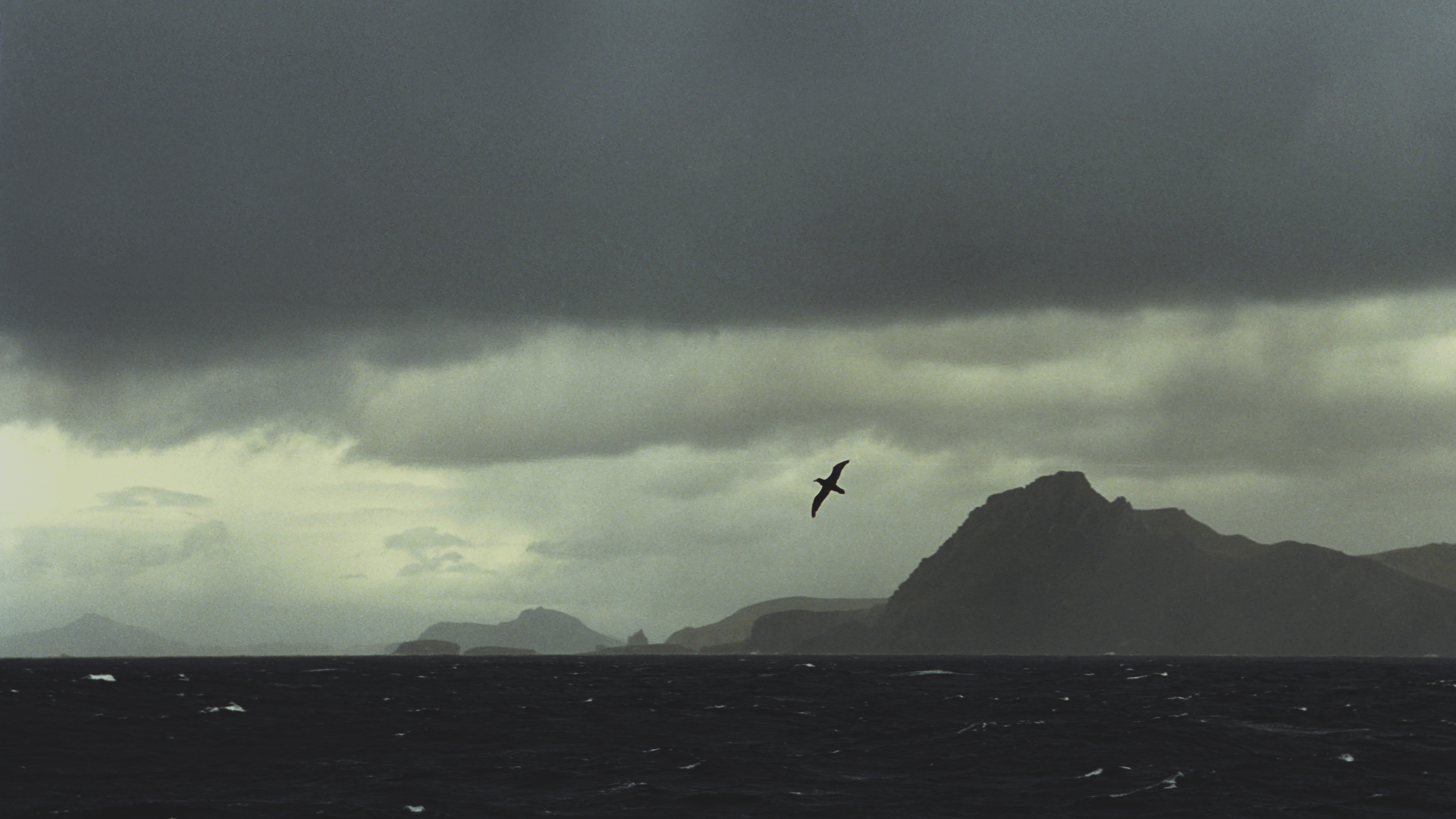
- The best known of the islands, Cape Horn

- Location within Southern Patagonia

Geography
- Coordinates: 55.8333°S 67.4167°W
- Archipelago: Tierra del Fuego
- Adjacent to: Pacific Ocean
- Major islands: Hermite, Herschel, Deceit and Hornos

Administration
- Chile
- Region: Magallanes
- Province: Antártica
- Commune: Cabo de Hornos

Additional information
- NGA UFI= -884095

The Hermite Islands (Spanish: Islas Hermite) are the islands Hermite, Herschel, Deceit and Hornos as well as the islets Maxwell, Jerdán, Arrecife, Chanticleer, Hall, Deceit, and Hasse at almost the southernmost end of South America. The smallest and southernmost of the major islands is Hornos Island, the location of Cape Horn. The islands are located south of the Wollaston Islands and separated from them by the Franklin Channel. The islets Terhalten, Sesambre, Evout and Barnevelt are located easterly and are not considered part of the Hermite islands.

The southernmost islands of the American continent are the Diego Ramírez Islands, southwest of Cape Horn. South of all these islands is the Drake Passage.

The southern tip of Deceit island extends southeastwards through a line of sharp-edged rocks known as Los dientes o garras de Deceit (the Teeth or Claws of Deceit) that end in a rough islet, Islote Deceit. The islands form part of the Cabo de Hornos National Park.

== History ==
They are named after the Dutch admiral Jacques l'Hermite (1582–1624). Hermite Islands were visited by Charles Darwin at the turn of 1832/1833. In 1979, the Argentine military junta known as the National Reorganization Process made a strategic feint towards the islands, called Operation Soberania, in an attempt to compel Chile into renegotiating their border with Argentina.

Wollaston and Hermite Islands

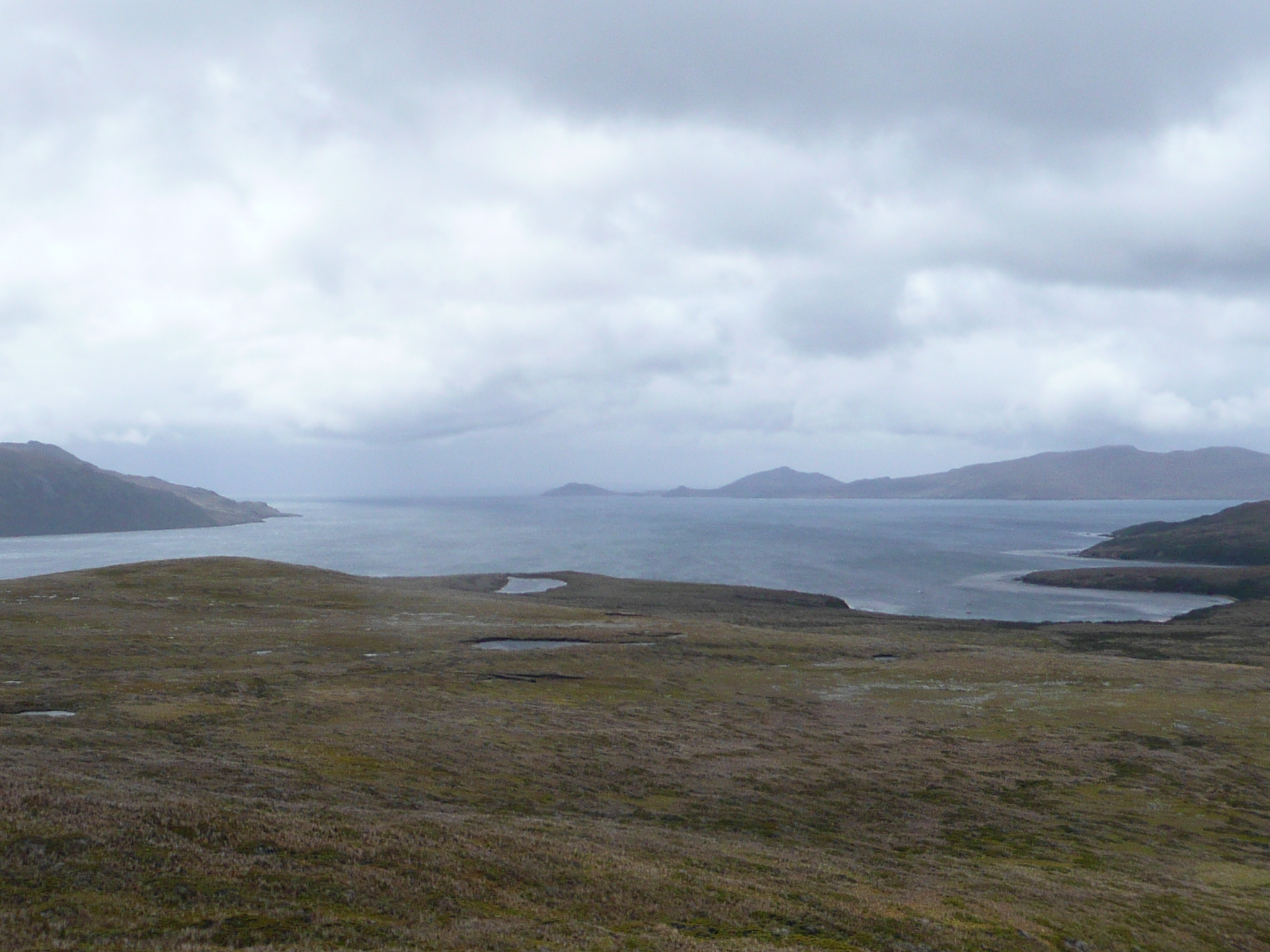
Landscape in the Hermite Islands

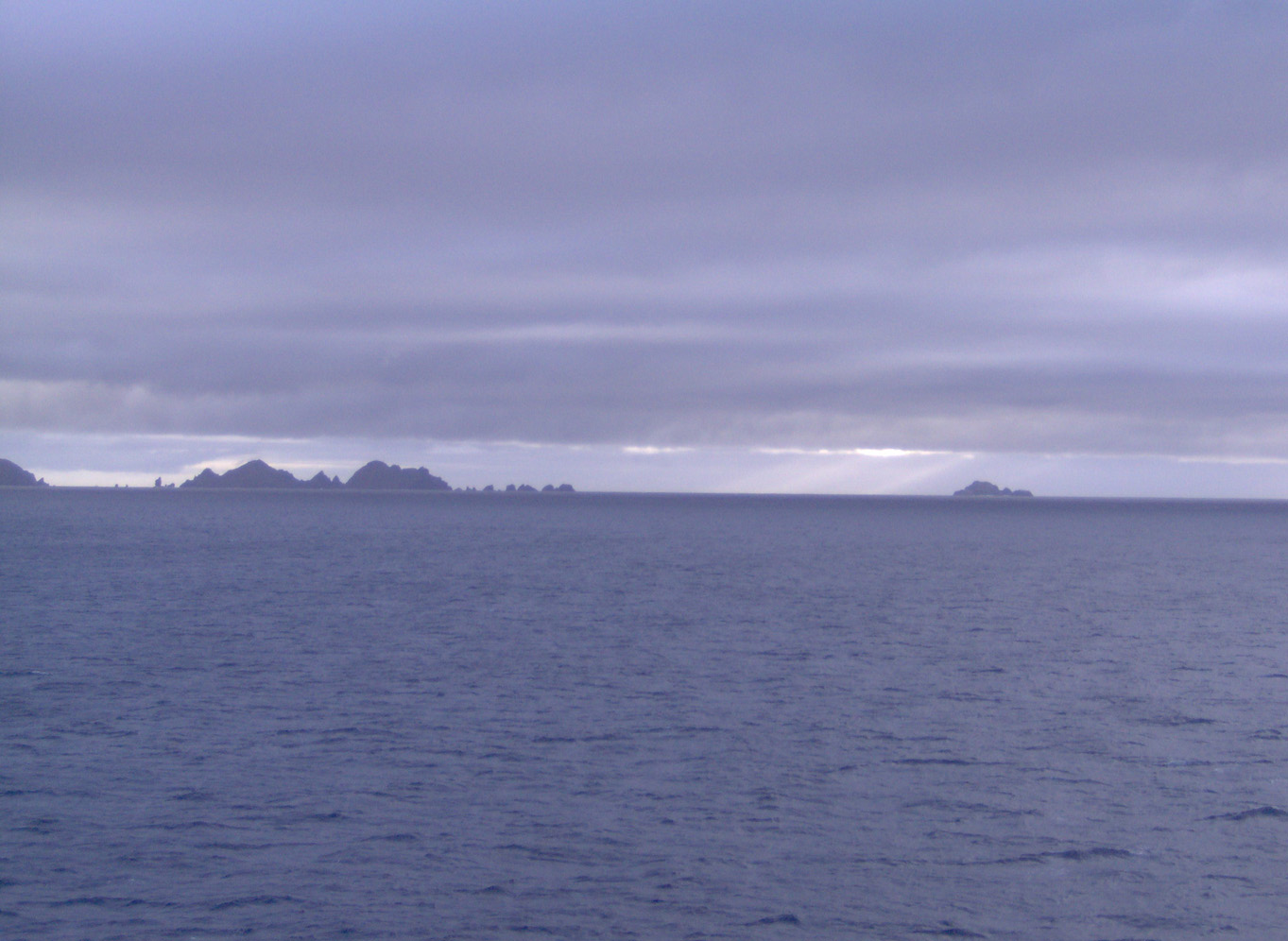
Teeth of Deceit

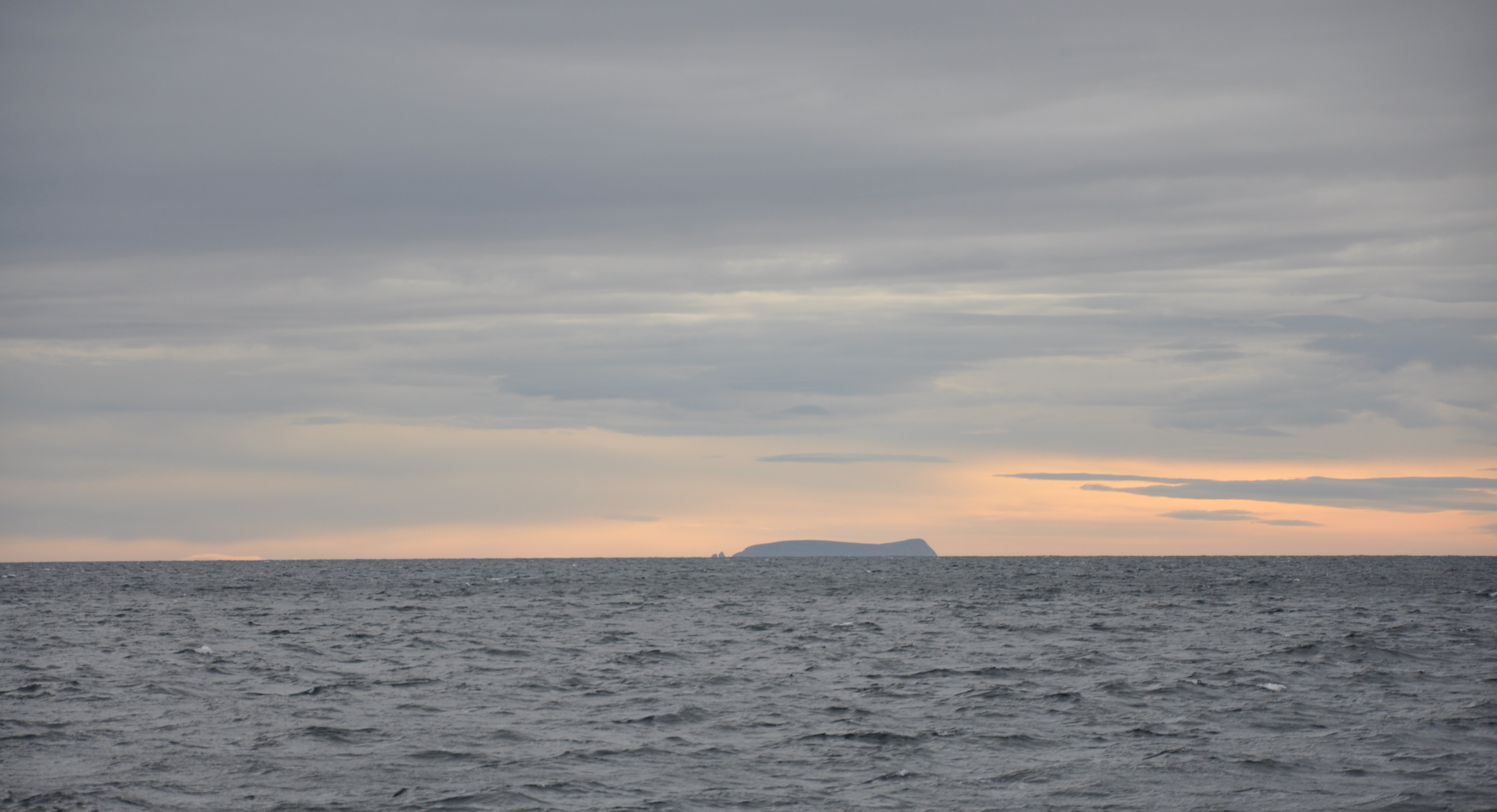
Barnevelt Island

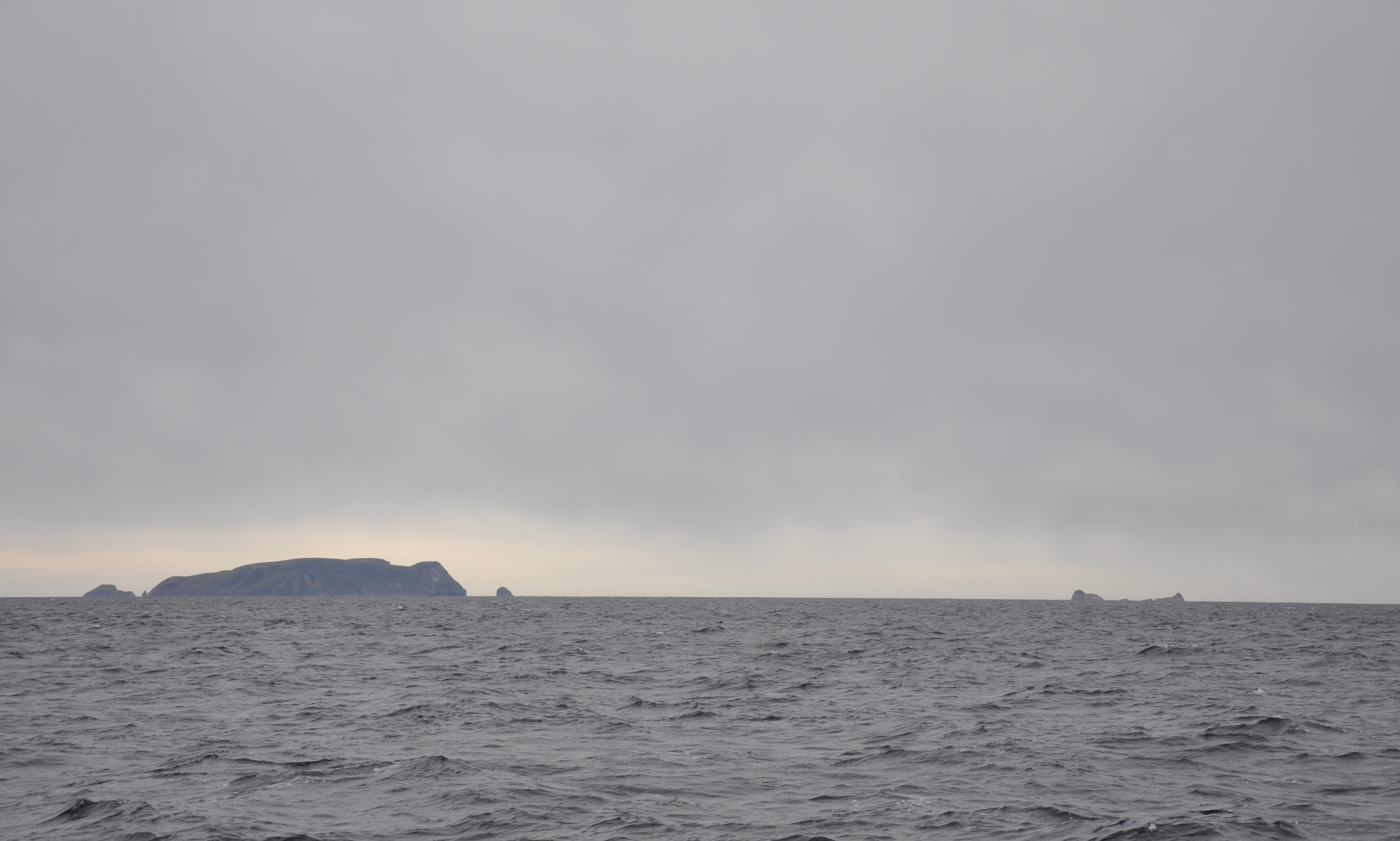
Evout Island

== See also ==
- List of islands of Chile
- Beagle conflict
- Media related to Hermite Islands at Wikimedia Commons
