= Wollaston Islands =

Southern Chilean islands

Native name: Islas Wollaston Nickname: Yachkusin (Yahgan language)
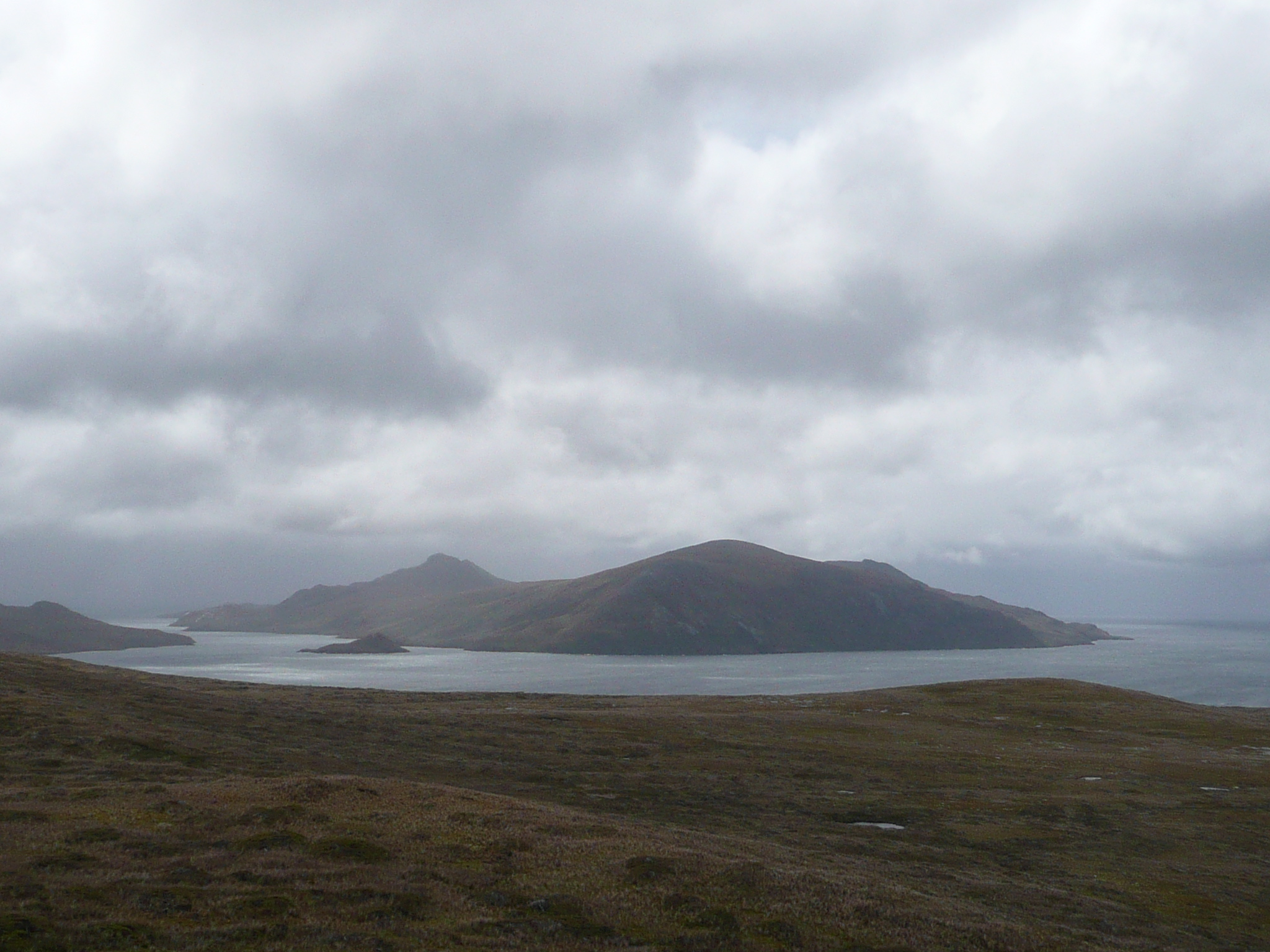
- Freycinet Island

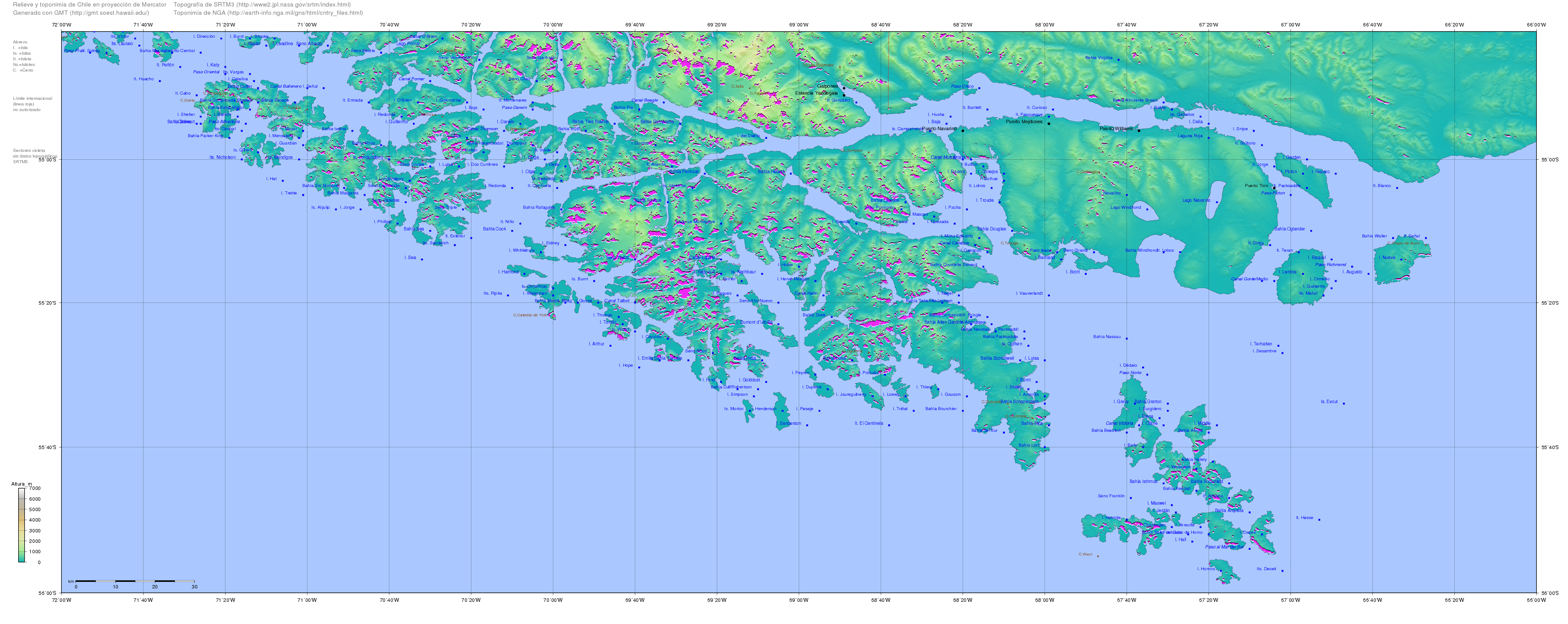
- Islands south of the Beagle Channel, except Diego Ramírez Islands

Geography
- Coordinates: 55°40′S 67°30′W
- Archipelago: Tierra del Fuego
- Adjacent to: Pacific Ocean
- Major islands: Grevy, Bayly, Wollaston and Freycinet

Administration
- Chile
- Region: Magallanes
- Province: Antártica
- Commune: Cabo de Hornos

Additional information
- NGA UFI=36923 (Deceit Island), -904864 (Wollaston Island), -904865 (Wollaston Islands), -882858 (Freycinet Island), -873377 (Bayly Island)

The Wollaston Islands (Spanish: Islas Wollaston) are a group of islands in Chile south of Navarino Island and north of Cape Horn and east of the Hoste Island. The islands are Grevy, Bayly, Wollaston and Freycinet, as well as the islets Dédalo, Surgidero, Diana, Otarie, Middle and Adriana. The islands are part of Cabo de Hornos National Park.

== Geography ==
The islands are located north of the Hermite Islands and separated from them by the Franklin Channel. The islets Terhalten, Sesambre, Evout and Barnevelt are located easterly and are not considered part of the Wollaston islands. North of the islands is Nassau Bay.

== History ==
The islands were named between 1829 and 1831 by the British naval officer Henry Foster, after the English scientist William Hyde Wollaston. The indigenous name in the Yahgan language was Yachkusin, "place of islands". The Yahgan lived throughout central Tierra del Fuego to Cape Horn. Numerous place names reflect British interests in the 19th century.

In the later 19th century, Wollaston was the site of an English South American Mission Society to the Yahgan. (See Martin Gusinde Anthropological Museum#Stirling Pavilion).

After Chile and Argentina achieved independence, they asserted their claims in this area. The Boundary Treaty of 1881 between Chile and Argentina ceded the islands south of the Beagle Channel to Chile, but in 1904 Argentina claimed the islands. In 1978 Argentina started the Operation Soberanía to occupy the islands around Cape Horn and then, in a second phase, either to stop or continue hostilities according to the Chilean reaction. The invasion was halted after a few hours. In 1982, after the invasion of the Falklands, the Argentine government planned also the invasion of the islands south of the Beagle Channel.

Grevy, Bayly, Wollaston and Freycinet Islands at the Cape Horn.

== See also ==
- List of islands of Chile
- Hermite Islands, the islands south of Wollaston
- Diego Ramírez Islands, the southernmost islands of the region
- Media related to Wollaston Islands at Wikimedia Commons
