= Centro Experimental Kampenaike =

Experimental farm in the Magallanes Region, Chile

Coordinates: 52°42′22.93″S 70°55′20.92″W

Centro Experimental Kampenaike (Kampenaike Experimental Center) is an experimental farm in Magallanes Region owned and operated by Instituto de Investigación Agropecuaria (INIA). It is located about 60 km northeast of Punta Arenas and hosts the southernmost certified potato farm in World. It is one of the two farms in operated by INIA Kampenaike, the local branch of INIA, the other is farm is a demonstrative unit in Puerto Natales.

The name Kampenaike means "place of sheep" in the indigenous Tehuelche language.
