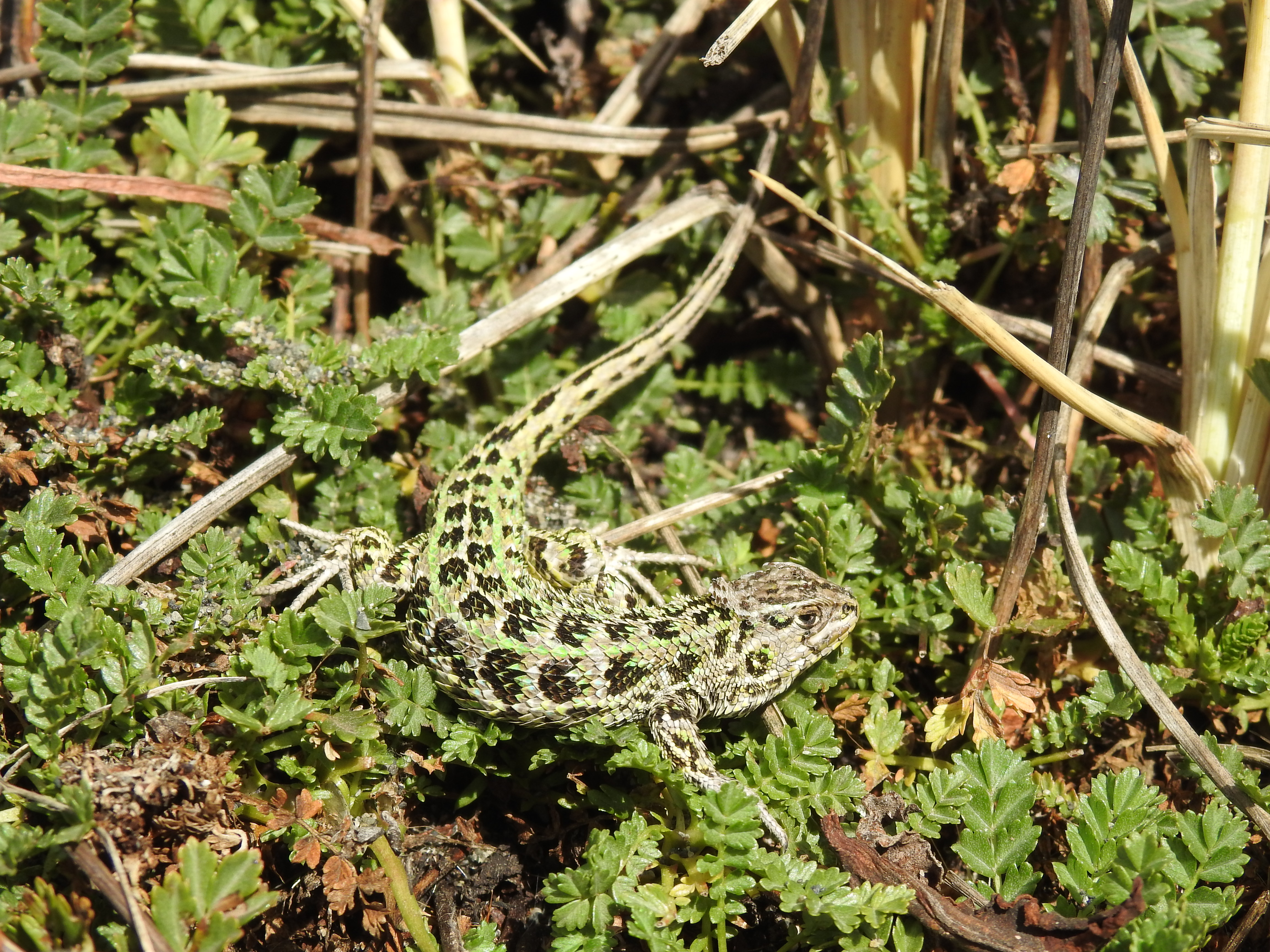

Conservation status
- Least Concern (IUCN 3.1)

Scientific classification
- Kingdom: Animalia
- Phylum: Chordata
- Class: Reptilia
- Order: Squamata
- Suborder: Iguania
- Family: Liolaemidae
- Genus: Liolaemus
- Species: L. magellanicus

Binomial name
- Liolaemus magellanicus (Hombron & Jacquinot, 1853)

Synonyms
- Proctotretus magellanicus Hombron & Jacquinot, 1853; Liolaemus proximus F. Werner, 1904; Saccodeira arenaria F. Werner, 1910

= Liolaemus magellanicus =

Species of lizard

Liolaemus magellanicus, also known commonly as Magellan's tree iguana, is a species of lizard in the family Liolaemidae. The species is native to southern South America. It is notable for being the southernmost lizard species in the world.

== Etymology ==
The specific name, magellanicus, refers to the Straits of Magellan.

== Geographic range ==
Liolaemus magellanicus is found in Patagonia and Isla Grande de Tierra del Fuego in Chile and Argentina.

== Habitat ==
The preferred natural habitat of Liolaemus magellanicus is areas of low vegetation such as grassland and shrubland, at elevations from sea level to 1,100 m (3,600 ft).

== Description ==
Liolaemus magellanicus may attain a snout-to-vent length (SVL) of 6.2 cm (2.4 in), with a tail length about equal to the SVL.

== Gallery ==
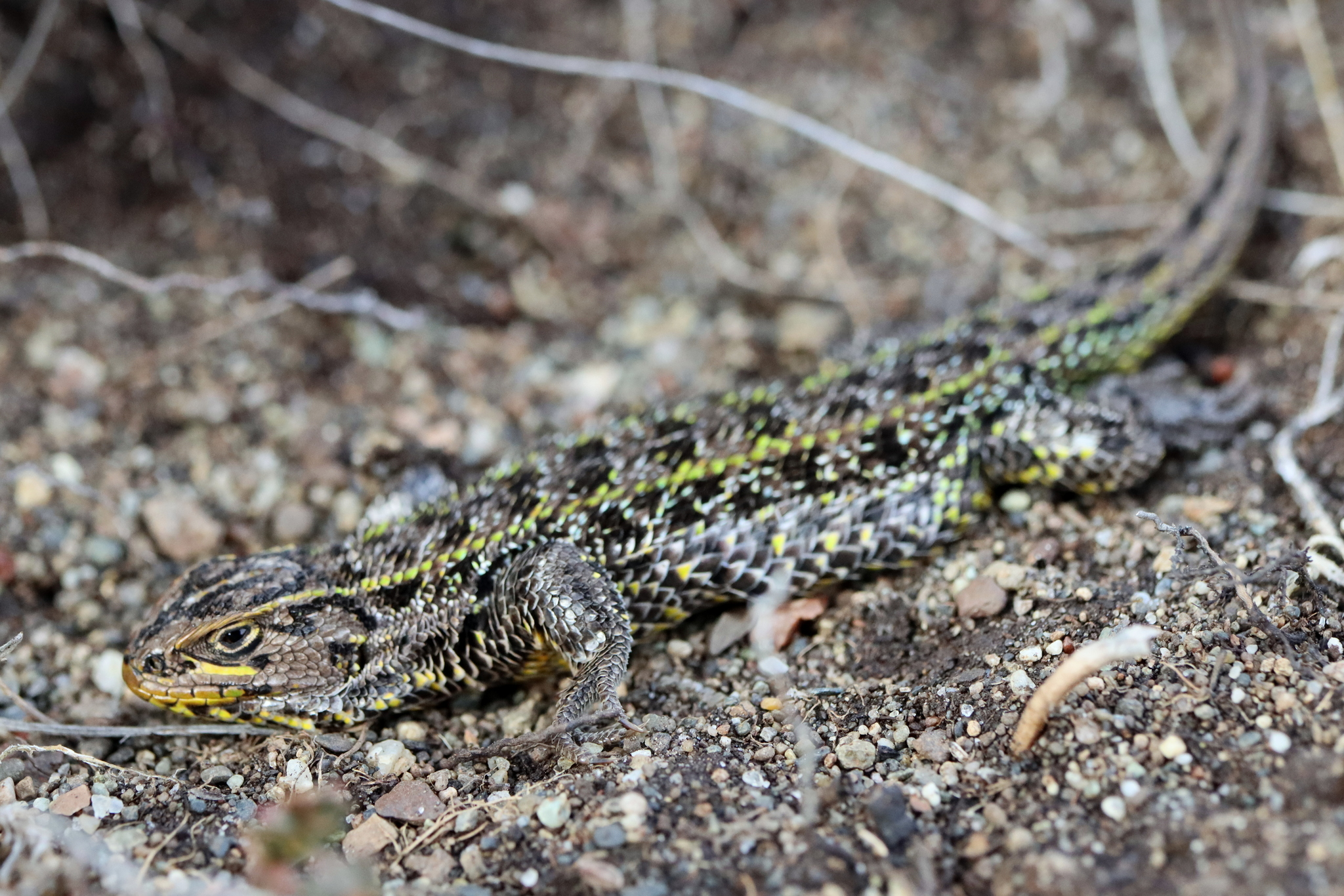

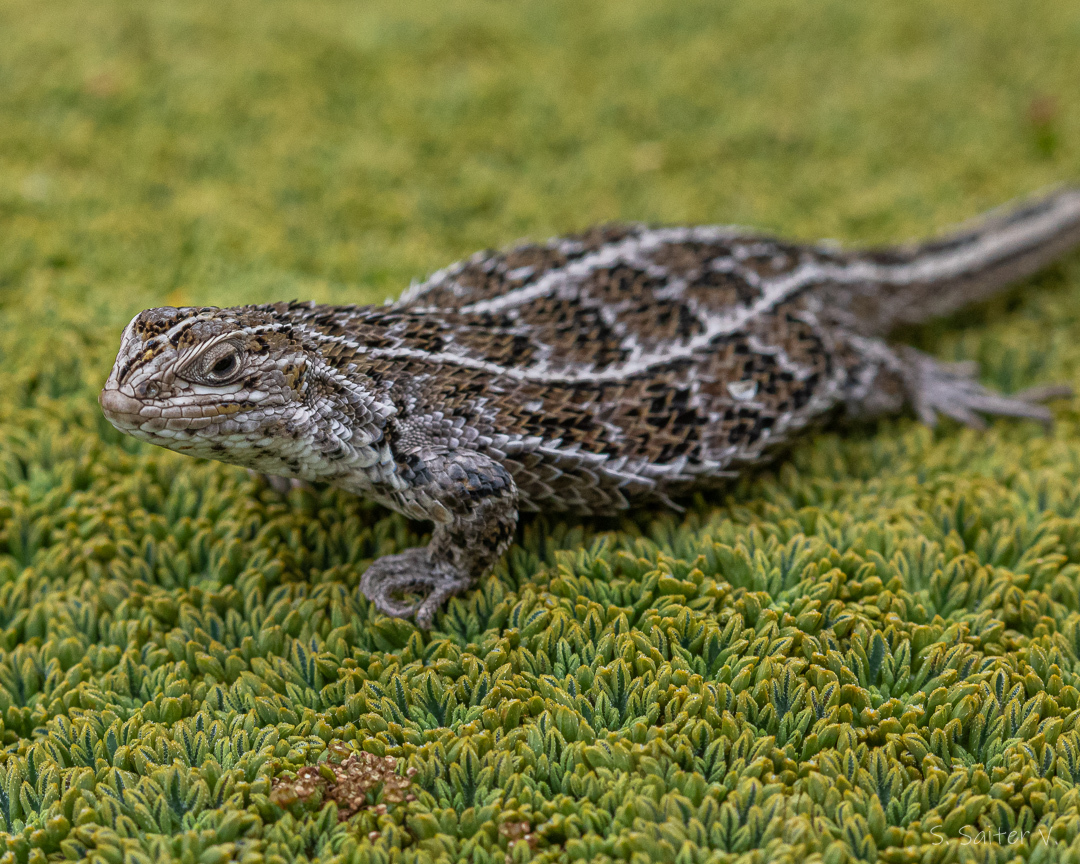

== Diet ==
Liolaemus magellanicus preys predominately upon insects, but also eats plant material.

== Reproduction ==
Liolaemus magellanicus is viviparous.
