= Hornos Island =

Subantarctic island of Chile, known for Cape Horn

Native name: Isla Hornos Nickname: The Horn
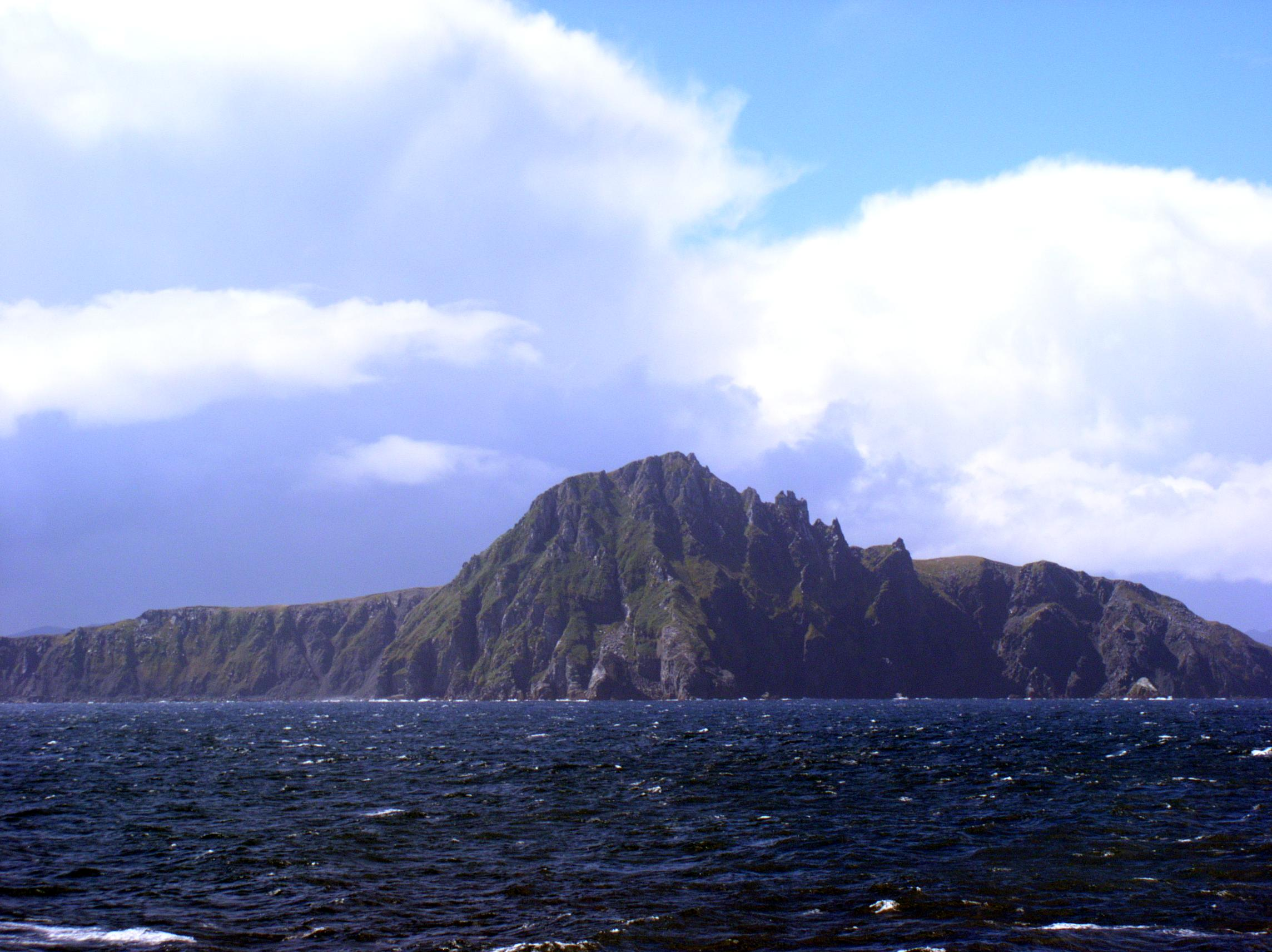
- The Hornos Island

- Location within Southern Patagonia

Geography
- Coordinates: 55.944078°S 67.280925°W
- Archipelago: Tierra del Fuego
- Adjacent to: Pacific Ocean / Atlantic Ocean
- Area: 25.1 km^{2} (9.7 sq mi)

Administration
- Chile
- Region: Magallanes
- Province: Antártica
- Commune: Cabo de Hornos

Demographics
- Population: 5 (2019)

Additional information
- NGA UFI= -884347

Hornos Island or Horn Island (Spanish: Isla Hornos) is a Chilean island at the southern tip of South America. The island is mostly known for being the location of Cape Horn, also known as "the Horn". It is generally considered South America's southernmost island, but the Diego Ramírez Islands are farther south. The island is one of the Hermite Islands, part of the Tierra del Fuego archipelago.

The Chilean Navy maintains a station on the island, consisting of a residence, utility building, chapel, and lighthouse. A short distance from the main station is a memorial, including a large sculpture featuring the silhouette of an albatross, in honour of the sailors who died while attempting to "round the Horn".

The island is within the Cabo de Hornos National Park.

== Ecology ==
The island is dominated by Magellanic moorlands. Exposed locations are dominated by bunch grasses and short shrubs, low to the ground to avoid wind. Short trees are found only in wind protected areas. The world's southernmost tree, a Nothofagus betuloides, is found on Hornos Island.

The island has extensive penguin colonies along the coast, with no land predators present.

The island's population of olive grass mice (Abrothrix olivacea) are the southernmost land mammals in the world.

== People ==
In 2019, the island had a population of five, consisting of the lighthouse keeper, his wife, and their three children.

The island is also the southernmost extension of pre-industrial humanity. The world's southernmost archaeological site, consisting of harpoon points, butchered bones, and a hearth or cooking camp, was found in 2019 by a National Geographic team led by Brian Buma.

== Geology ==
The composition of the island is mainly of Cretaceous granite with Jurassic volcanic rocks in the northwest. The lower areas of the island are filled with peat moss.

== Climate ==
Mean temperature: 5.3 °C (41.54 °F)
Maximum temperature: 20.5 °C (68.9 °F) (February 1996)
Minimum temperature: −14.5 °C (5.9 °F) (June 1992)
Mean relative humidity: 86.4%
Mean wind direction: 264°
Mean wind speed: 84 knots (156 km/h; 97 mph)
Maximum wind speed: 119 knots (220 km/h; 137 mph) (August 1995)
Rainfall (yearly mean): 697.5 millimetres (27.46 in)
Maximum rainfall: 1,263.2 millimetres (49.73 in) (1990)

== See also ==
- Cape of Good Hope
- Enderby Island, the most southerly known Polynesian archaeological site.
