= Cabo de Hornos National Park =

Protected area in southern Chile

- IUCN category II (national park)
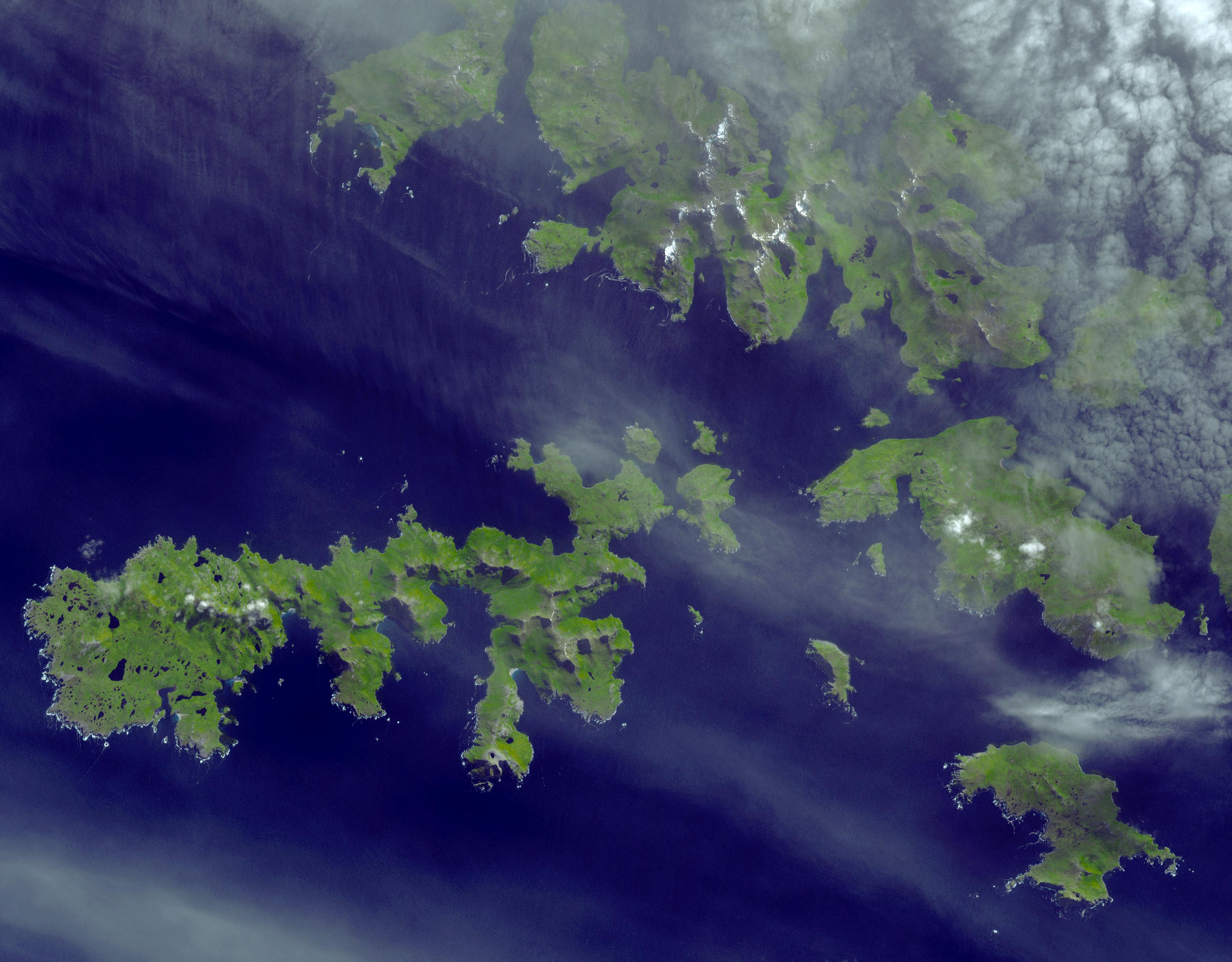
- Satellite image of Hermite Islands

- Location within Chile
- Location: Tierra del Fuego, Chile
- Nearest city: Puerto Williams
- Coordinates: 55.833°S 67.433°W
- Area: 63,093 ha (155,906 acres)
- Established: April 26, 1945
- Visitors: 10,407 (in 2016)
- Governing body: Corporación Nacional Forestal

Cabo de Hornos National Park is a protected area in southern Chile that was designated a Biosphere Reserve by UNESCO in 2005, along with Alberto de Agostini National Park. The world's southernmost national park, it is located 12 hours by boat from Puerto Williams in the Cape Horn Archipelago, which belongs to the Commune of Cabo de Hornos in the Antártica Chilena Province of Magallanes y Antártica Chilena Region.

The park was created in 1945 and includes the Wollaston Islands and the Hermite Islands. It covers 63,093 hectares (155,906 acres) and is run by the Corporacion Nacional Forestal (CONAF), the Chilean body that governs all national parks in Chile.

== History ==
The region of Cabo de Hornos (Cape Horn) was discovered by the Dutch merchant Isaac Le Maire on January 29, 1616, and was named Hoorn after the Dutch city where the expedition came from. The national park was created on April 26, 1945, by the Chilean Ministry of Agriculture.

== Geography ==
The park covers an area of 63,093 hectares (155,906 acres), at a general altitude of 220 meters, with the exception of two major peaks: Cerro Pirámide, which has an altitude of 406 meters, and Cerro Hyde, the highest point with an altitude of 670 meters. It comprises a series of the islands and islets that make up the archipelago, including the main landmasses of the Wollaston and Hermite Islands.The park is the southernmost piece of Chilean territory, except for the Chilean Antarctic Territory which is in dispute.

=== Climate ===
The climate in the park is generally cool, owing to the southern latitude. There are no clearly distinct weather stations, but a study in 1882–1883 found an annual rainfall of 1,357 millimetres (53.4 in), with an average annual temperature of 5.2 °C (41.4 °F). Winds were reported to average 30 kilometres per hour (8.33 m/s; 18.64 mph), (5 Bf), with squalls of over 100 kilometres per hour (27.78 m/s; 62.14 mph), (10 Bf) occurring in all seasons. There are 278 days of rainfall (70 days of snow) and 2000 mm of annual rainfall

Cloud coverage is generally extensive, with averages from 5.2 eighths in May and July to 6.4 eighths in December and January. Precipitation is high throughout the year: the weather station on the nearby Diego Ramirez Islands, 109 kilometres (68 miles) south-west in the Drake Passage, shows the greatest rainfall in March, averaging 137.4 millimetres (5.41 in); while October, which has the least rainfall, still averages 93.7 millimetres (3.69 in). Wind conditions are generally severe, particularly in winter. In summer, the wind at Cape Horn is gale force up to 5% of the time, with generally good visibility; however, in winter, gale-force winds occur up to 30% of the time, often with poor visibility.

=== Flora ===
The terrain is almost entirely treeless peat and its main characteristic is the presence of tuberous vegetable formations covered in low dense Poaceaes (Gramineae), lichen and mosses that are resistant to the low temperatures and harsh weather. In some parts, small wooded areas of Antarctic beech or nire, lenga, winter's bark or canelo, and Magellanic coigüe can be found.

=== Fauna ===
As with the flora, fauna in the park is scarce and many of the species are endangered. The fauna is dominated by birds and maritime mammals. Bird species found on the islands include: Magellanic penguin, southern giant petrel, kelp gull, red-legged cormorant, and southern royal albatross. The park has been designated an Important Bird Area (IBA) by BirdLife International because it supports significant populations of southern rockhopper and Magellanic penguins, sooty shearwaters, blackish cinclodes and striated caracaras.

Some of the birds species found in Cape Horn

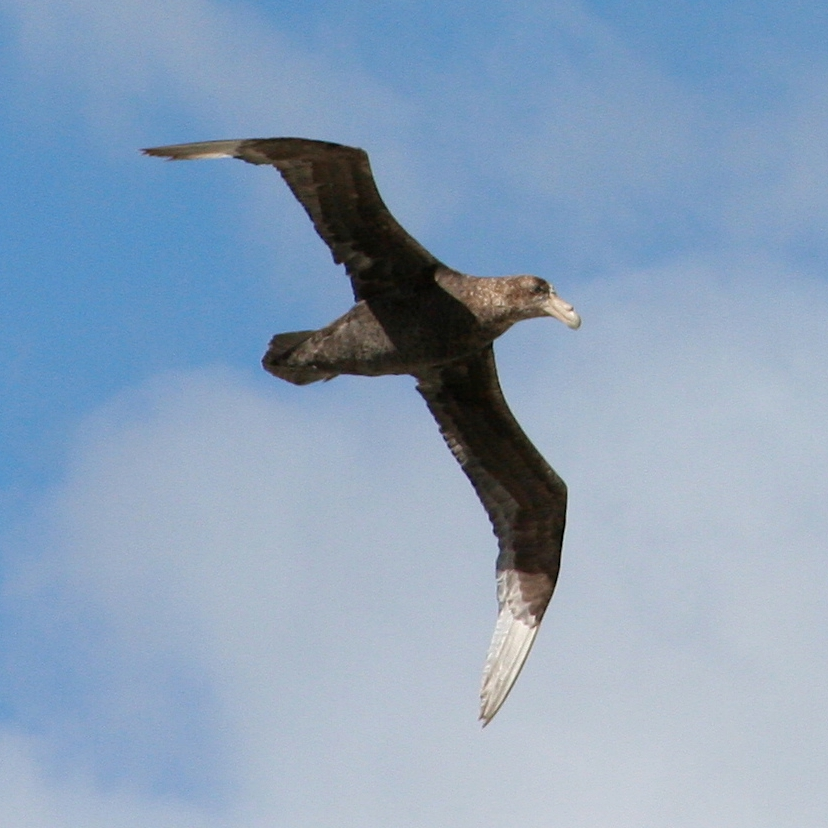
Southern giant petrel (Macronectes giganteus), also known as the Antarctic giant petrel, giant fulmar, stinker, and stinkpot.

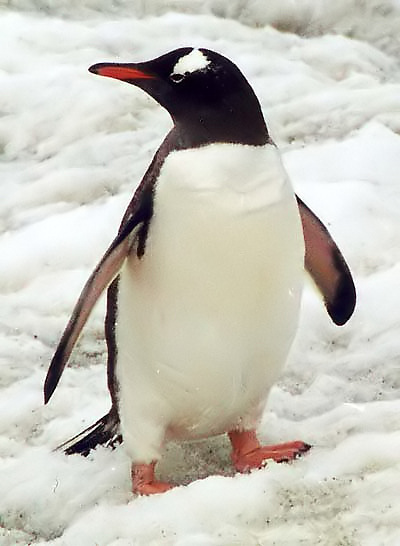
Antarctic penguin (Pygoscelis papua ellsworthi) also known as red peak penguin

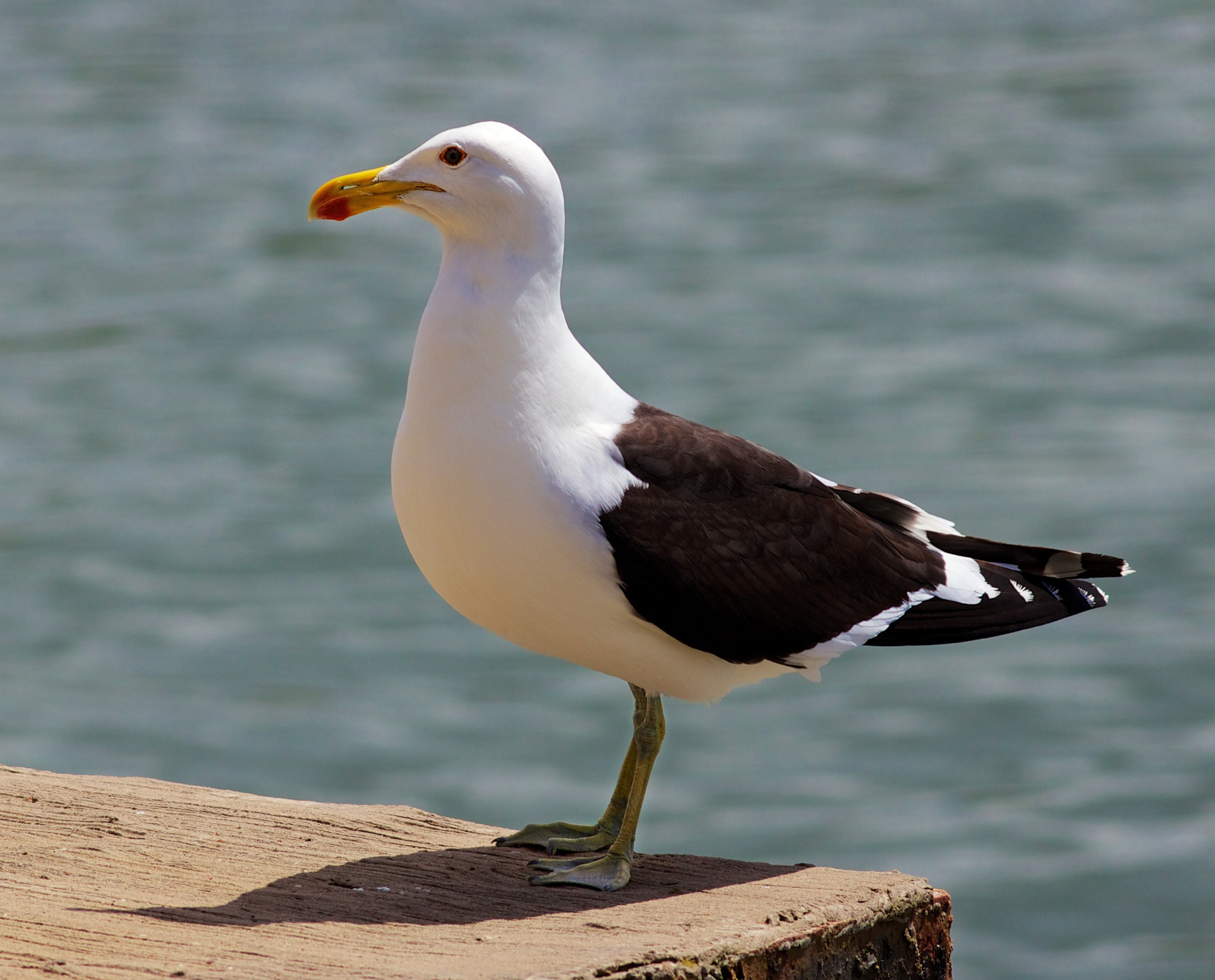
Kelp gull (Larus dominicanus), also known as the Dominican gull

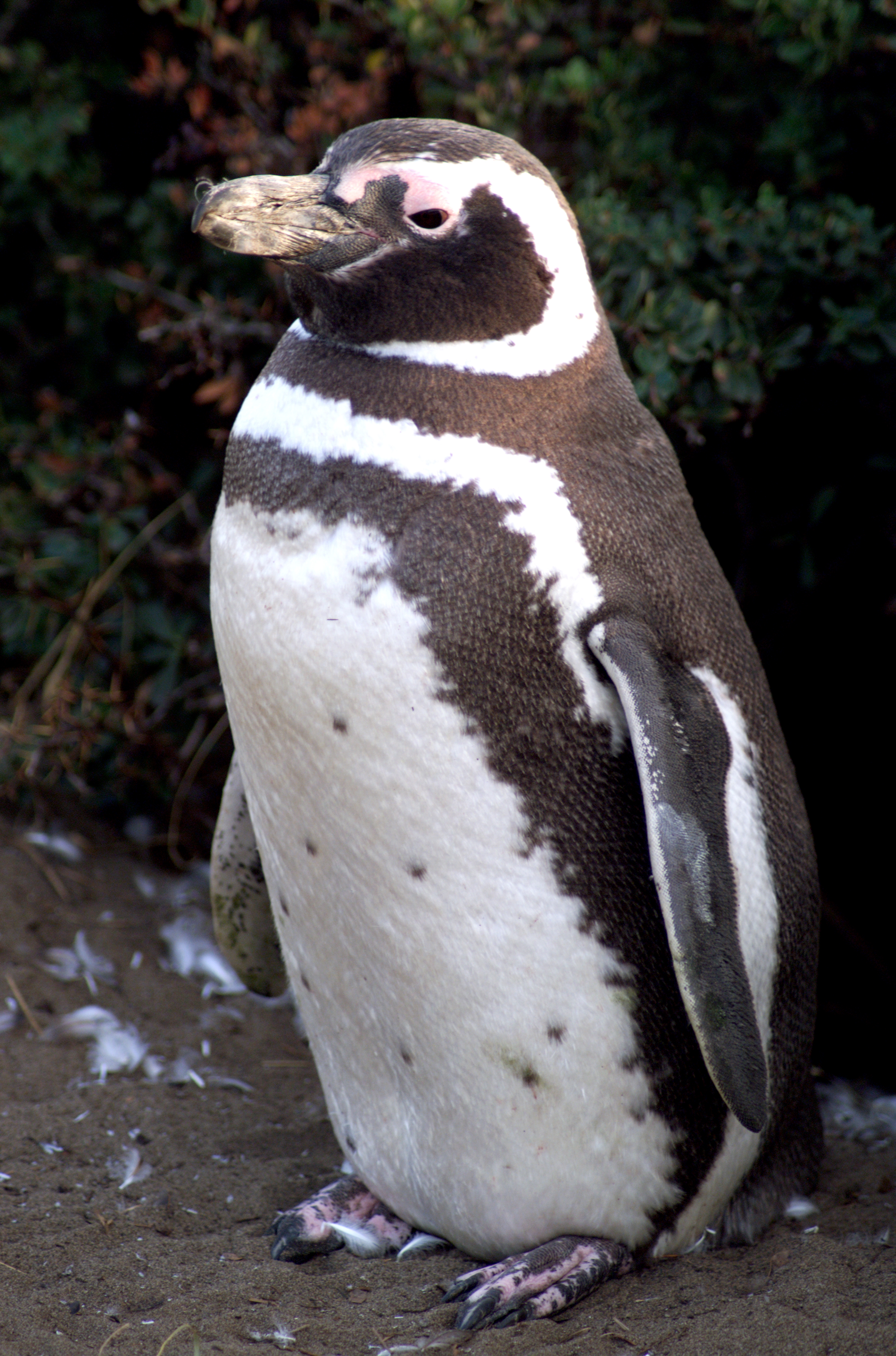
The Magellanic penguin (Spheniscus magellanicus)

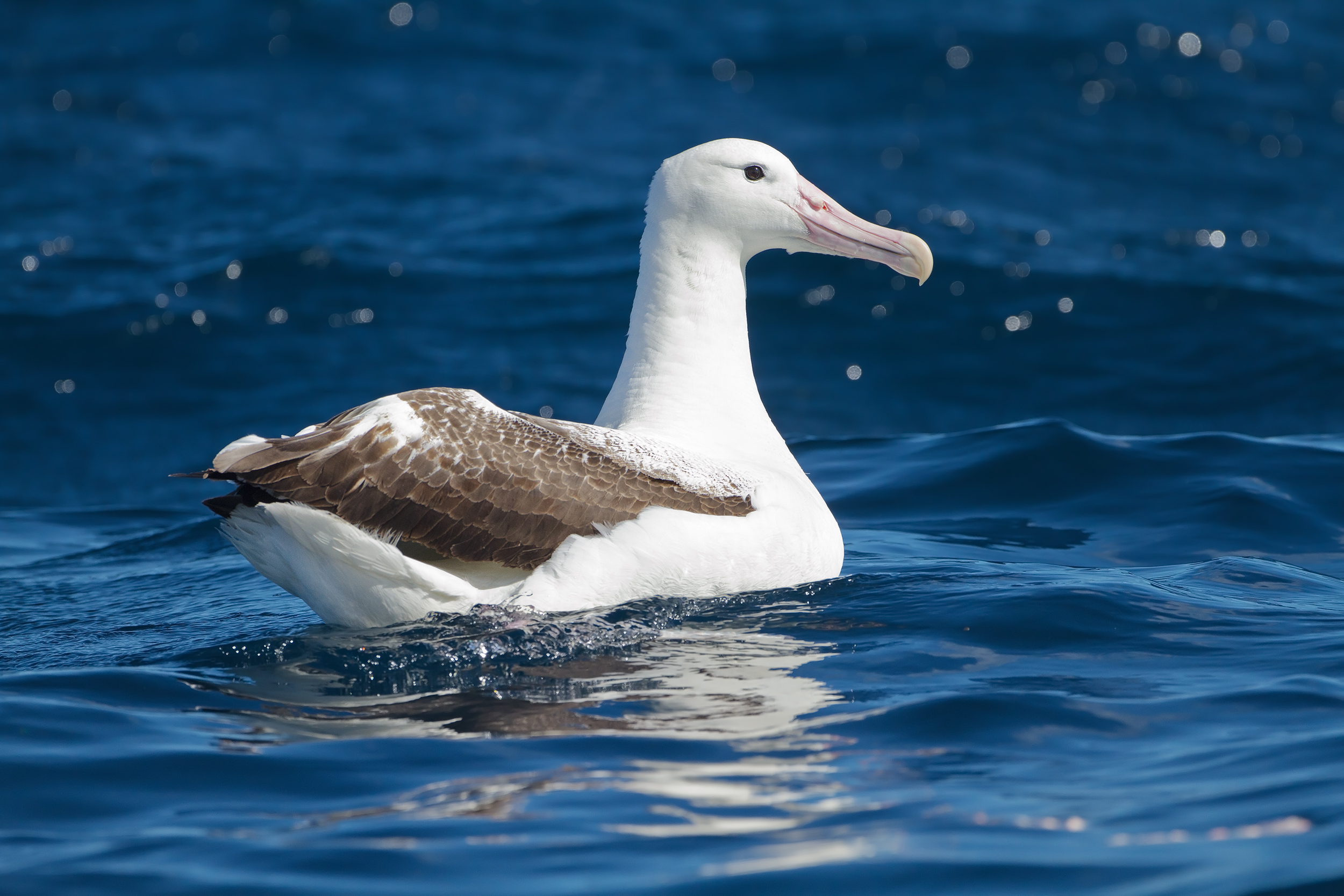
Southern royal albatross (Diomedea epomophora)

Mammal species found in the park include: marine otter (known locally as chungungo), leopard seal, Chilean dolphin (also known as the black dolphin or tonina), Burmeister's porpoise, Peale's dolphin and humpback whale.

Some of Cabo de Hornos mammals

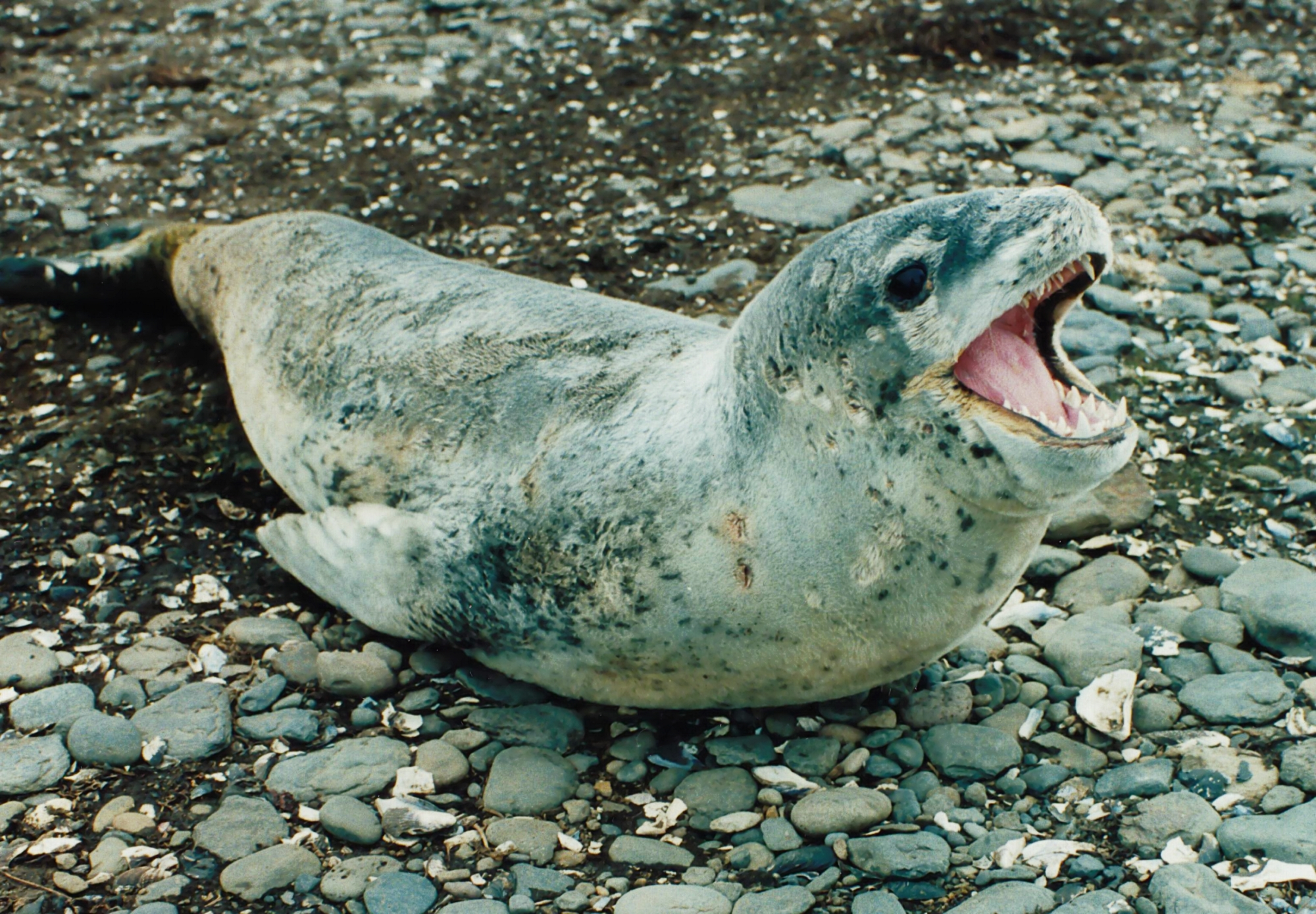
Leopard seal (Hydrurga leptonyx), also referred to as the sea leopard.

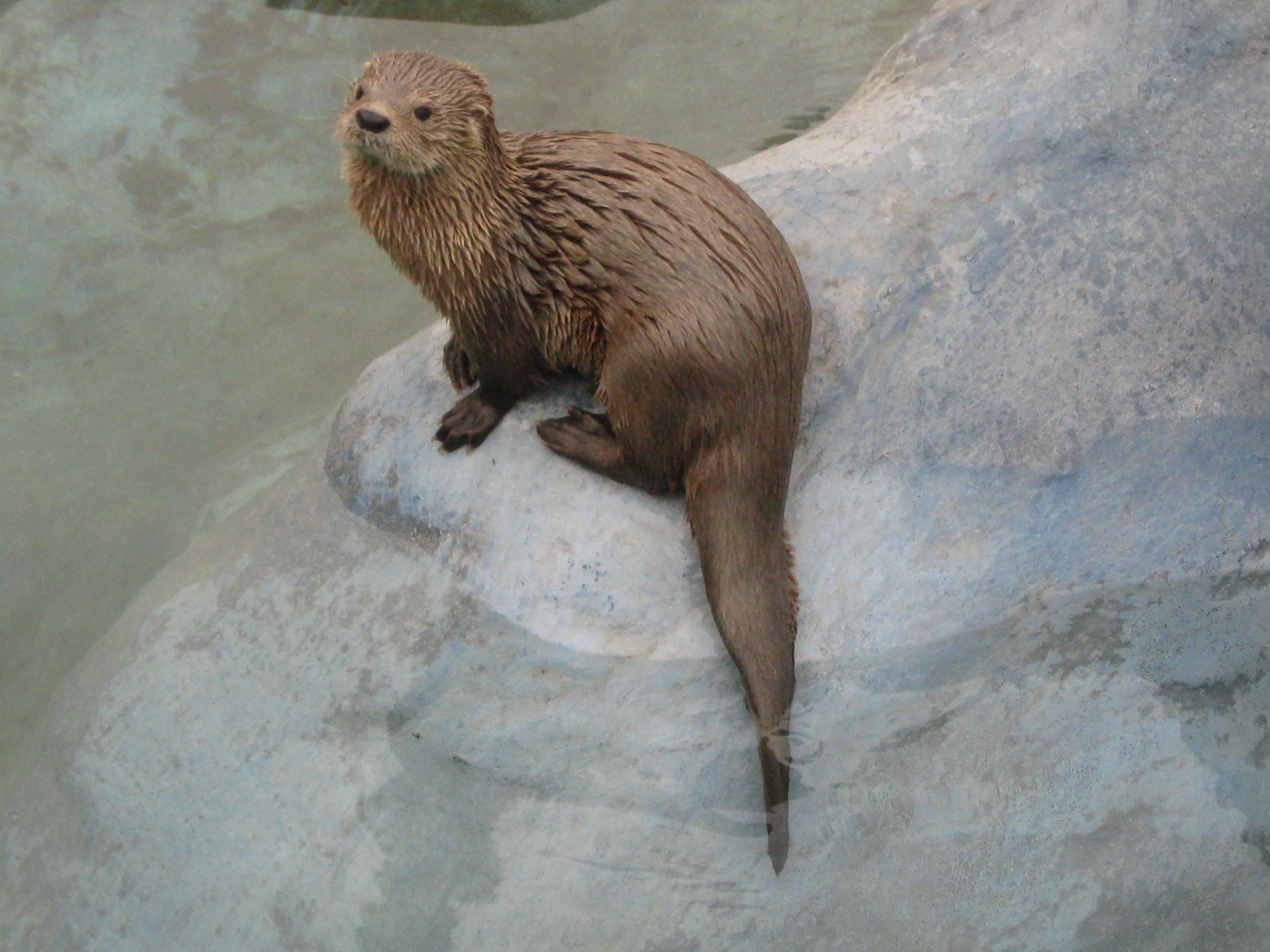
Marine otter or chungungo.

Chilean or black dolphin, also known as tonina

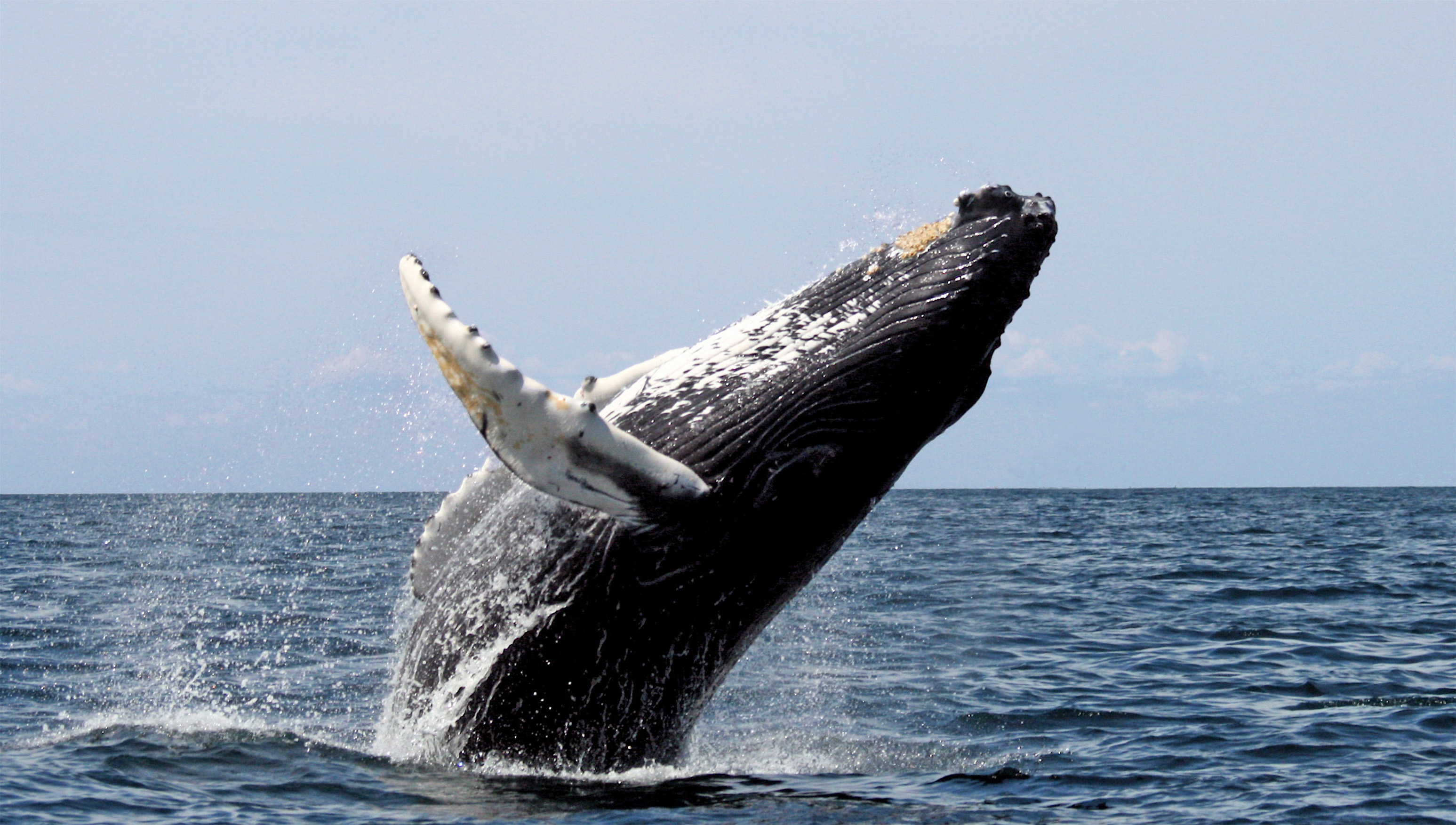
Humpback whale

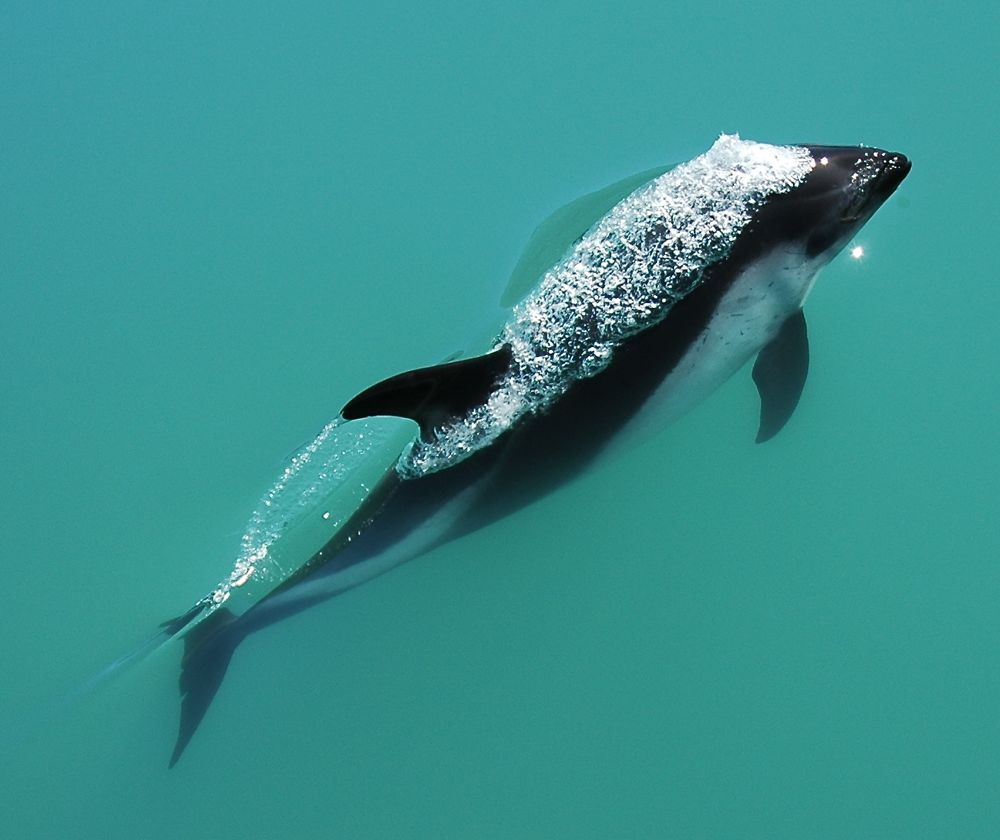
Peale's dolphin (Lagenorhynchus australis)

== See also ==
- Cape Horn Biosphere Reserve
- Cape Horn
