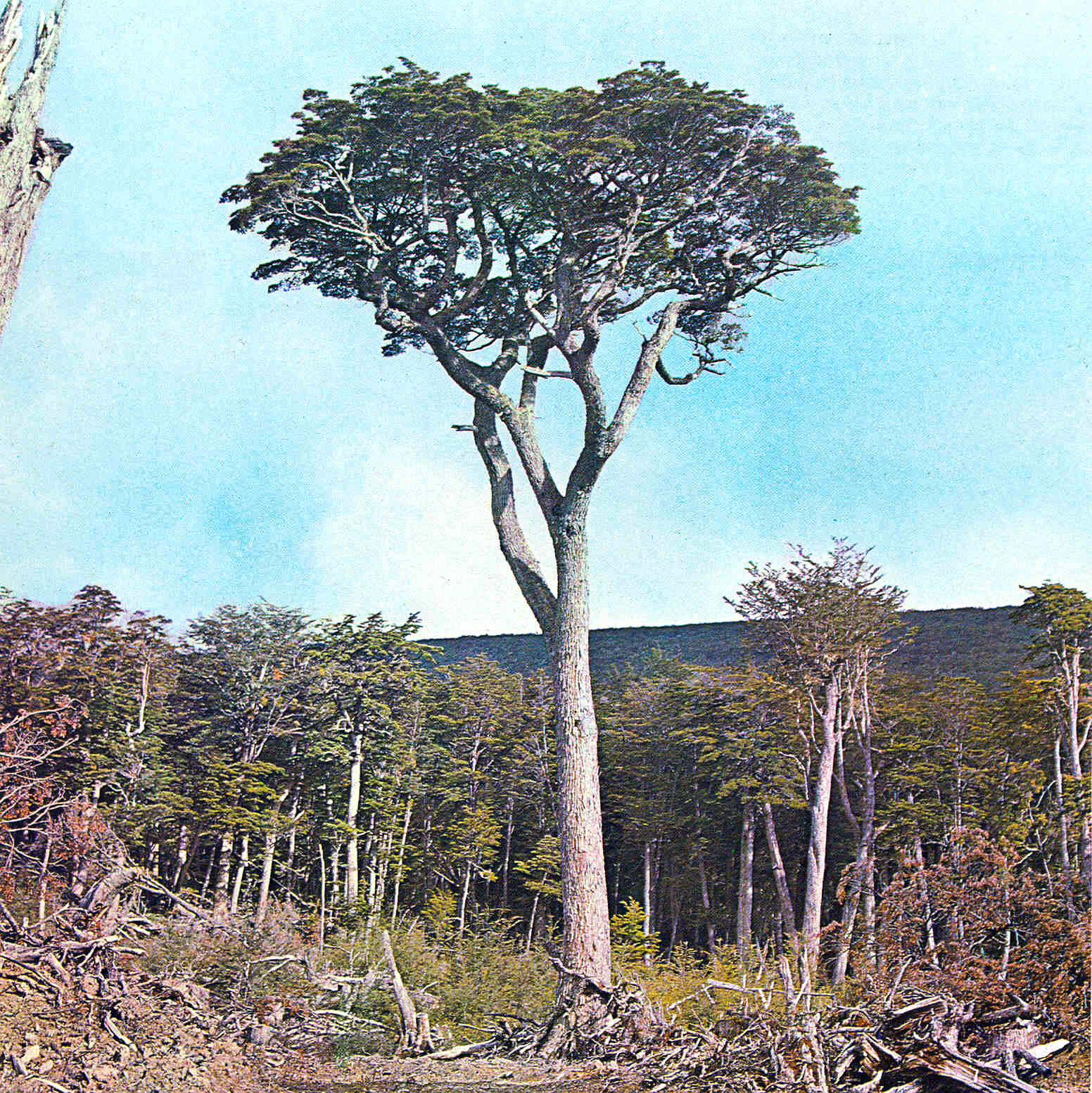

Conservation status
- Least Concern (IUCN 3.1)

Scientific classification
- Kingdom: Plantae
- Clade: Embryophytes
- Clade: Tracheophytes
- Clade: Spermatophytes
- Clade: Angiosperms
- Clade: Eudicots
- Clade: Rosids
- Order: Fagales
- Family: Nothofagaceae
- Genus: Nothofagus
- Subgenus: Nothofagus subg. Nothofagus
- Species: N. betuloides

Binomial name
- Nothofagus betuloides (Mirb.) Oerst.

Synonyms
- Betula antarctica G.Forst.; Calusparassus betuloides (Mirb.) Hombr. & Jacquinot ex Decne.; Calusparassus forsteri (Hook.) Hombr. & Jacquinot ex Decne.; Fagus betuloides Mirb.; Fagus dubia Mirb.; Fagus forsteri Hook.; Nothofagus betuloides (Mirb.) Blume; Nothofagus dubia (Mirb.) Oerst.; Nothofagus dubia (Mirb.) Blume; Nothofagus forsteri (Hook.) Krasser; Nothofagus patagonica Gand.

= Nothofagus betuloides =

Magellan's beech

Species of plant

Nothofagus betuloides, Magellan's beech or guindo, is a tree native to southern Patagonia.

In 1769, Sir Joseph Banks collected a specimen of the tree in Tierra del Fuego during Captain Cook's first voyage.

Its occurrence on Hornos Island earns it the distinction of being the southernmost tree on Earth.

== Distribution ==
Nothofagus betuloides grows from southern Chile and southern Argentina (40°S) to Tierra del Fuego (56°S). It is found from sea level to 500 m (1,600 ft) above mean sea level. One specimen growing near the southeastern corner of Hornos Island (Cape Horn) was identified in 2019 as the southernmost tree in the world.

== Description ==
It is an evergreen tree up to 30 m (98 ft) tall, with a branching reaching appearance. In its natural Patagonian environment, it tolerates cold winters and thrives in the absence of heat, but it is not tolerant of persistent freezing. In the exposed sites of its southerly coastal or Andean distribution, the species grows as a wind formed shrub.

Magellan's beech is very long-lived, with specimens reaching ages of 500 to 600 years.

== Cultivation ==
Nothofagus betuloides has been cultivated in Scotland and the Faroe Islands, and has grown well there. Trees planted in the Faroe Islands, which were imported directly from its southernmost distribution in Tierra del Fuego, have turned out to be very hardy.

The wood has a slight lustre and a fine texture with a straight grain. Growth rings are not clearly visible and the heartwood is light pink to reddish-brown in colour. It is used in furniture and construction.

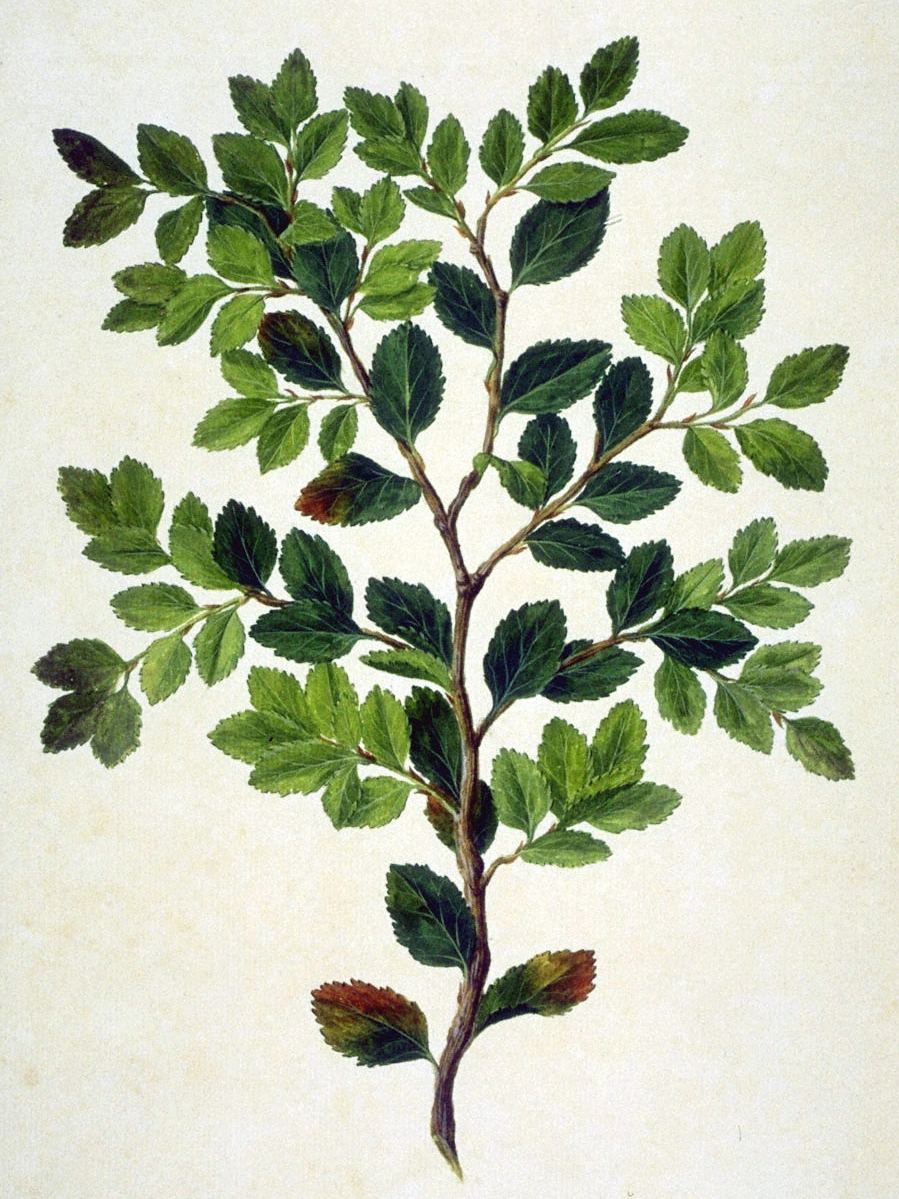
Illustration from specimens collected by the Endeavour, Tierra del Fuego, 1769

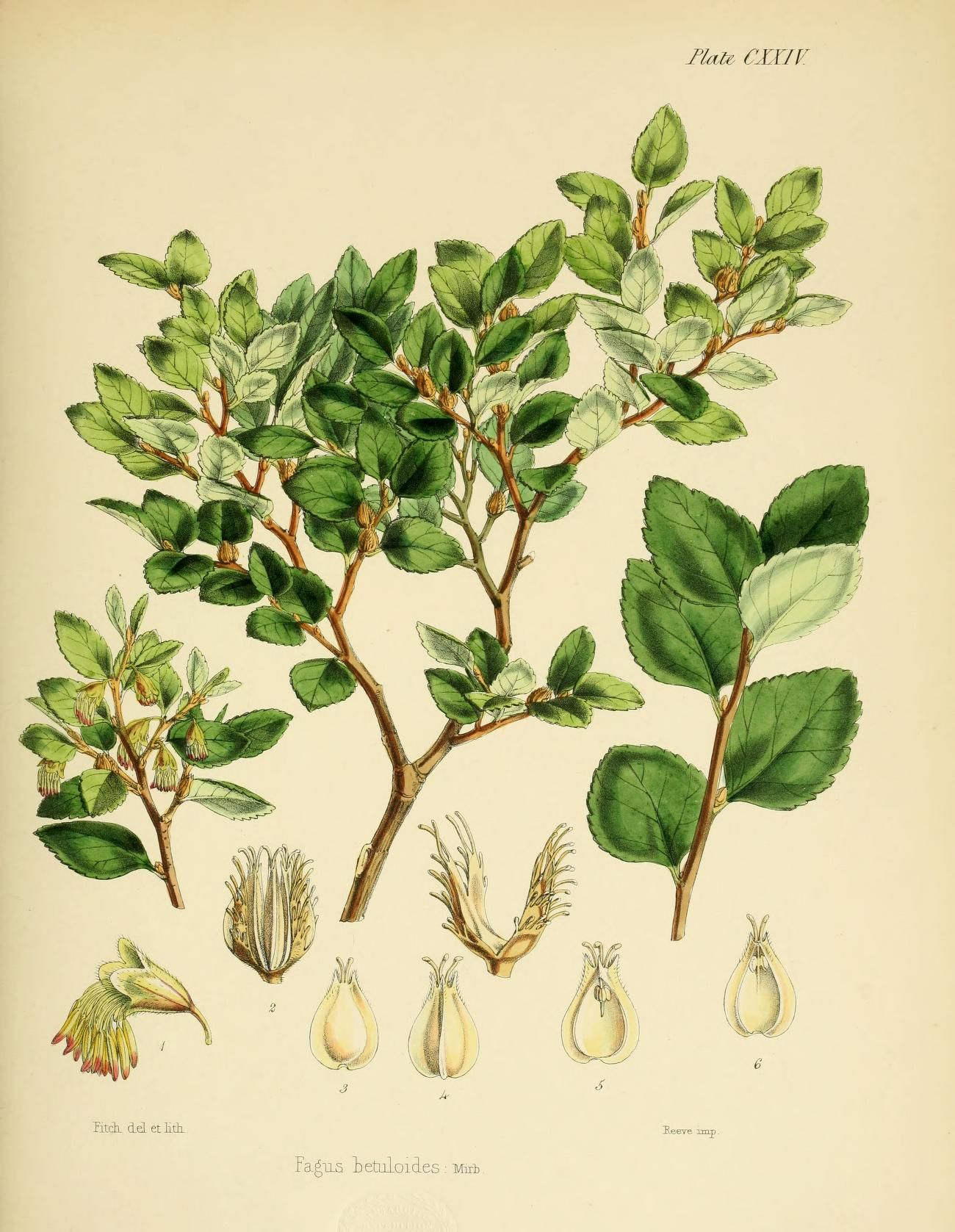
Fagus betuloides in Joseph Dalton Hooker's Flora Antarctica 1844–1846, from the Ross expedition of 1839–1843
