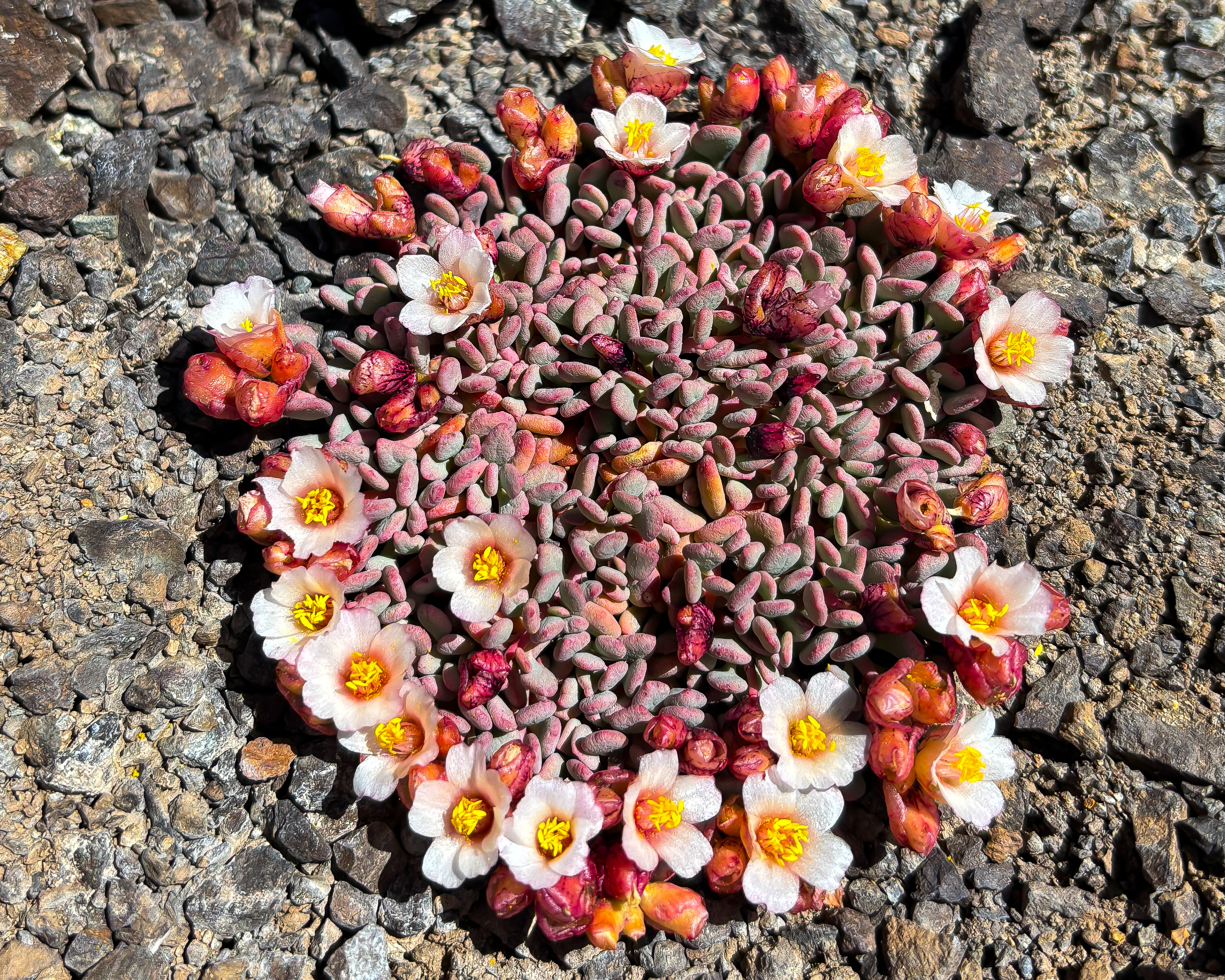
- Cistanthe frigida in Araucanía Region, Chile
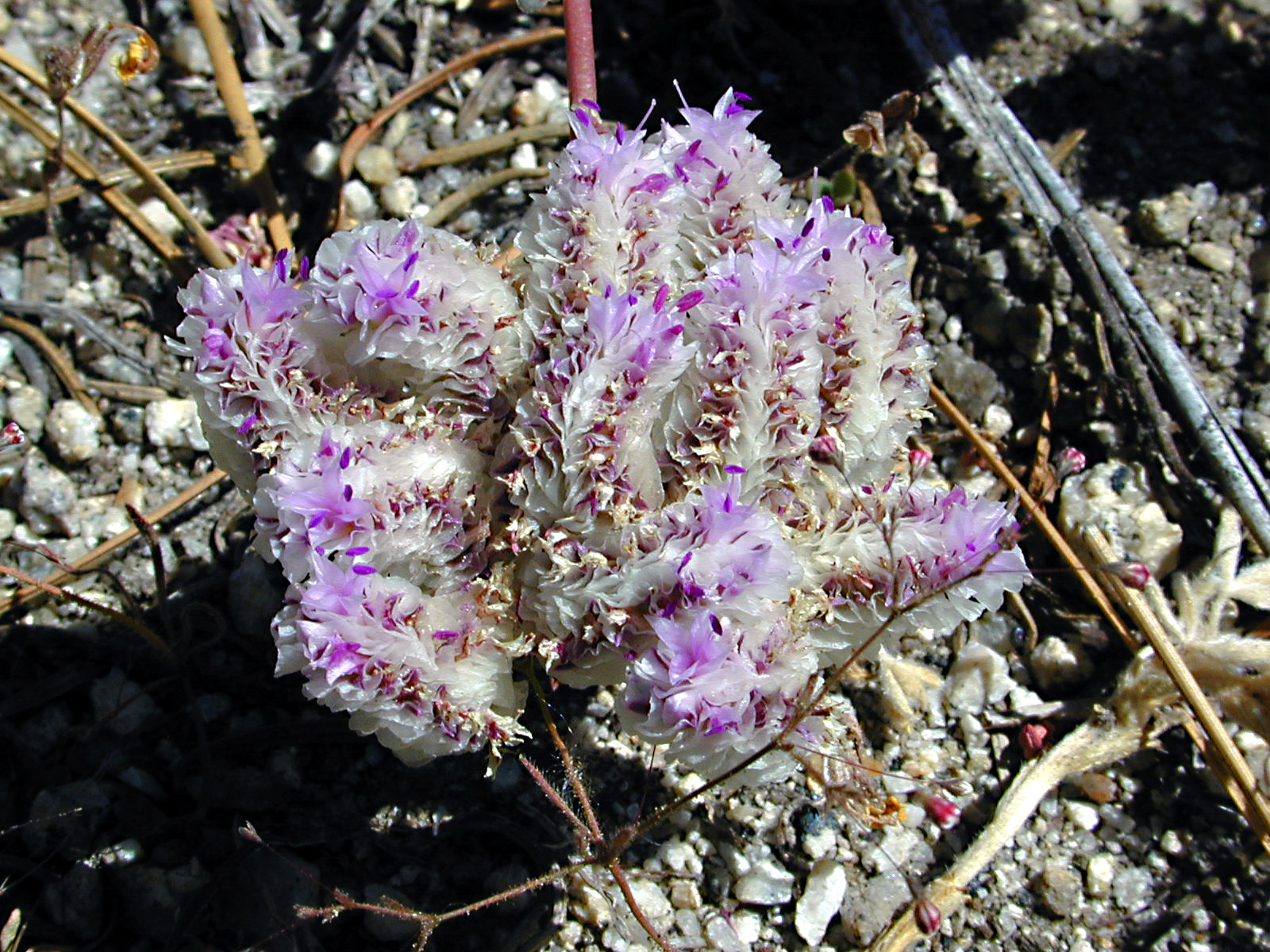
- Cistanthe sp. at Yosemite National Park

Scientific classification
- Kingdom: Plantae
- Clade: Tracheophytes
- Clade: Angiosperms
- Clade: Eudicots
- Order: Caryophyllales
- Family: Montiaceae
- Genus: Cistanthe; Spach (1836)

Species
- 45-50 - See text

Synonyms
- Philippiamra Kuntze (1891); Rhodopsis Lilja (1840); Tegneria Lilja (1839); Silvaea Phil. (1860)

= Cistanthe =

Genus of flowering plants

Cistanthe is a plant genus which includes most plants known as pussypaws. These are small, succulent flowering plants which often bear brightly colored flowers, though they vary quite a bit between species in appearance. Some species have flowers that are tightly packed into fluffy-looking inflorescences, the trait that gives them their common name.

The genus has a disjunct distribution, with species in California and northeastern Mexico, on the Mexican Pacific Islands, and western and southern South America from Peru to northern and central Chile to northwestern and southern Argentina.

Many are adapted to arid environments, with some able to withstand climates that almost completely lack rainfall. Cistanthe was a genus created to segregate several species previously classified in Calandrinia. Several species from other closely related genera have been moved into Cistanthe as well.

== Species ==
As of September 2025, Plants of the World Online accepts the following species:

- Cistanthe aegialitis (F.Phil. ex Phil.) Carolin ex Hershk.
- Cistanthe arenaria (Cham.) Carolin ex Hershk.
- Cistanthe cabrerae (D.A.Suárez) Peralta
- Cistanthe cachinalensis (Phil.) Peralta & D.I.Ford
- Cistanthe celedoniana J.M.Watson & A.R.Flores
- Cistanthe cephalophora (I.M.Johnst.) Carolin ex Hershk.
- Cistanthe chamissoi (Barnéoud) Carolin ex Hershk.
- Cistanthe chrysantha (I.M.Johnst.) Peralta & D.I.Ford
- Cistanthe coquimbensis (Barnéoud) Carolin ex Hershk.
- Cistanthe crassifolia (Phil.) Carolin ex Hershk.
- Cistanthe cymosa (Phil.) Hershk.
- Cistanthe fenzlii (Barnéoud) Carolin ex Hershk.
- Cistanthe floresiorum J.M.Watson
- Cistanthe frigida (Barnéoud) Peralta
- Cistanthe grandiflora (Lindl.) Schltdl.
- Cistanthe guadalupensis (M.G.Dudley) Carolin ex Hershk.
- Cistanthe humilis (Phil.) Peralta
- Cistanthe josetomasallendeana Hershk.
- Cistanthe lamprosperma (I.M.Johnst.) Peralta & D.I.Ford
- Cistanthe laxiflora (Phil.) Peralta & D.I.Ford
- Cistanthe lingulata (Ruiz & Pav.) Hershk.
- Cistanthe litoralis (Phil.) Carolin ex Hershk.
- Cistanthe longiscapa (Barnéoud) Carolin ex Hershk.
- Cistanthe maritima (Nutt.) Carolin ex Hershk. - seaside pussypaws
- Cistanthe mucronulata (Meyen) Carolin ex Hershk.
- Cistanthe neonominata J.M.Watson
- Cistanthe oblongifolia (Barnéoud) Carolin ex Hershk.
- Cistanthe paniculata (DC.) Carolin ex Hershk.
- Cistanthe philhershkovitziana Hershk.
- Cistanthe picta (Gillies ex Arn.) Carolin ex Hershk.
- Cistanthe sitiens (I.M.Johnst.) J.M.Watson & A.R.Flores
- Cistanthe stricta (Phil.) Peralta
- Cistanthe subspeciosa Hershk.
- Cistanthe subverticillata (Phil.) Carolin ex Hershk.
- Cistanthe thyrsoidea (Reiche) Peralta & D.I.Ford
- Cistanthe tovarii A.Galán
- Cistanthe trigona (Colla) Hershk.
- Cistanthe vicina (Phil.) Carolin ex Hershk.
- Cistanthe weberbaueri (Diels) Carolin ex Hershk.

=== Formerly placed here ===
- Calyptridium parryi - Parry's pussypaws (as Cistanthe parryi)
- Calyptridium pulchellum - Mariposa pussypaws (as Cistanthe pulchella)
- Calyptridium pygmaeum - pygmy pussypaws (as Cistanthe pygmaea)
- Calyptridium quadripetalum - fourpetal pussypaws (as Cistanthe quadripetala)
- Thingia ambigua - desert pussypaws (as Cistanthe ambigua (S.Watson) Carolin ex Hershk.)
