= Pussy paws =

Pussy paws or pussypaws is a common name of several genera of flowering plants in the family Montiaceae:

- Cistanthe, genus of small, succulent flowering plants
- Calyptridium
- Lewisiopsis, genus of flowering plant
