= C. roseum =

C. roseum may refer to:

- Calyptridium roseum, a synonym for Cistanthe rosea, a flowering plant species
- Catasetum roseum, a synonym for Catasetum lemosii, an orchid species
