= Calandrinia elegans =

Calandrinia elegans may refer to:

- Calandrinia elegans E.Vilm., a synonym of Cistanthe grandiflora (Lindl.) Schltdl. in genus Cistanthe
- Calandrinia elegans Spach, a synonym of Calandrinia ciliata (Ruiz & Pav.) DC.
- From alternative scientific name of a plant: This is a redirect from an alternative scientific name of a plant (or group of plants) to the accepted scientific name.
