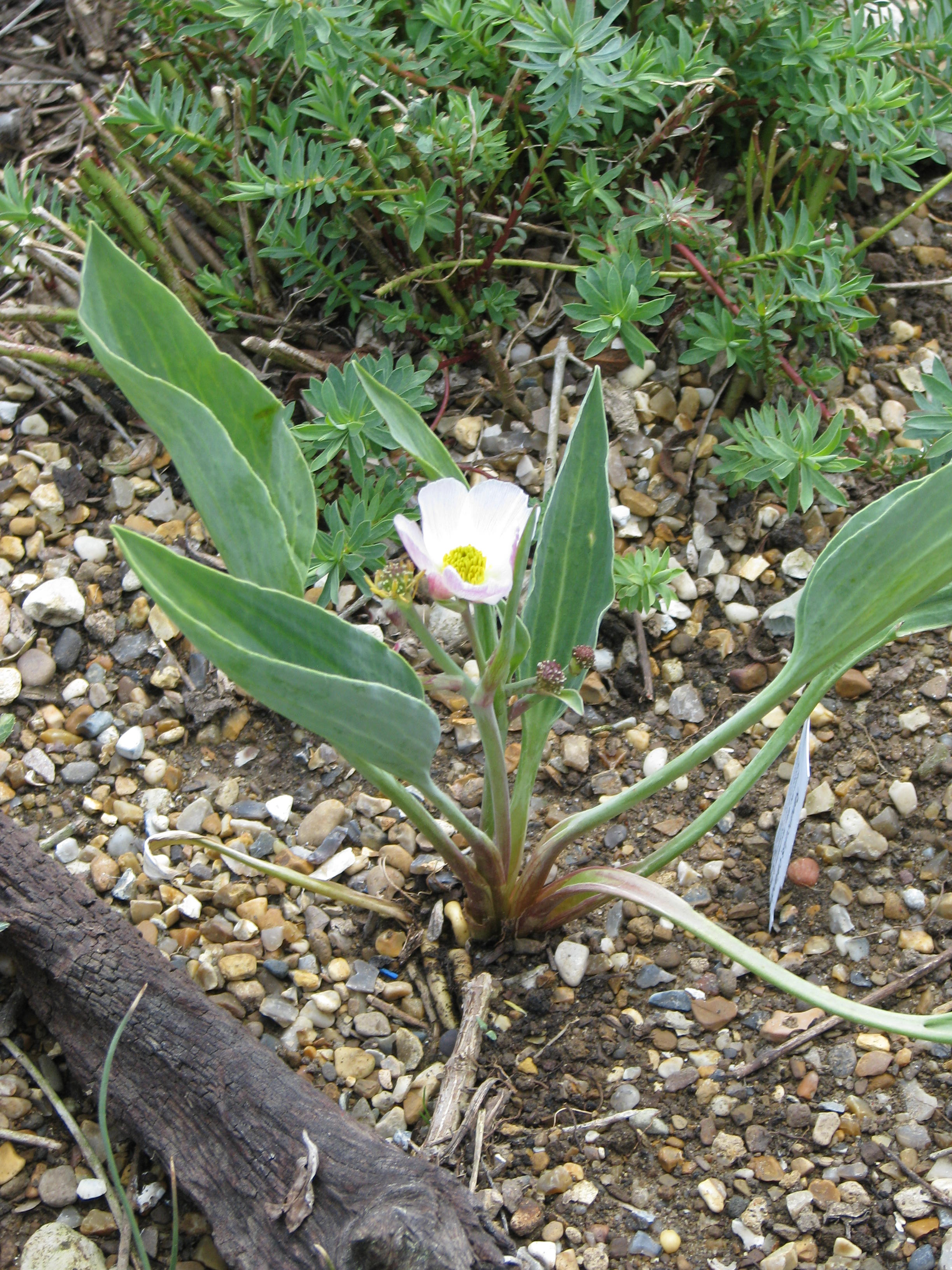

Scientific classification
- Kingdom: Plantae
- Clade: Tracheophytes
- Clade: Angiosperms
- Clade: Eudicots
- Order: Ranunculales
- Family: Ranunculaceae
- Genus: Ranunculus
- Species: R. calandrinioides

Binomial name
- Ranunculus calandrinioides Oliv.

= Ranunculus calandrinioides =

Species of flowering plant

Ranunculus calandrinioides, the high alpine buttercup, is a species of flowering plant in the family Ranunculaceae, native to the Atlas Mountains of North Africa. Growing to 20 cm (8 in) tall by 15 cm (6 in) broad, it is an herbaceous perennial with broad, grey-green leaves which die down in summer, and white flowers, often tinged with pink, in winter and spring. It is one of the earliest buttercups to flower.

The specific epithet calandrinioides likens the plant to the distantly related genus Calandrinia.

In cultivation it requires gritty soil and a dormant period in summer. It may be grown in an alpine house. The plant has gained the Royal Horticultural Society's Award of Garden Merit.
