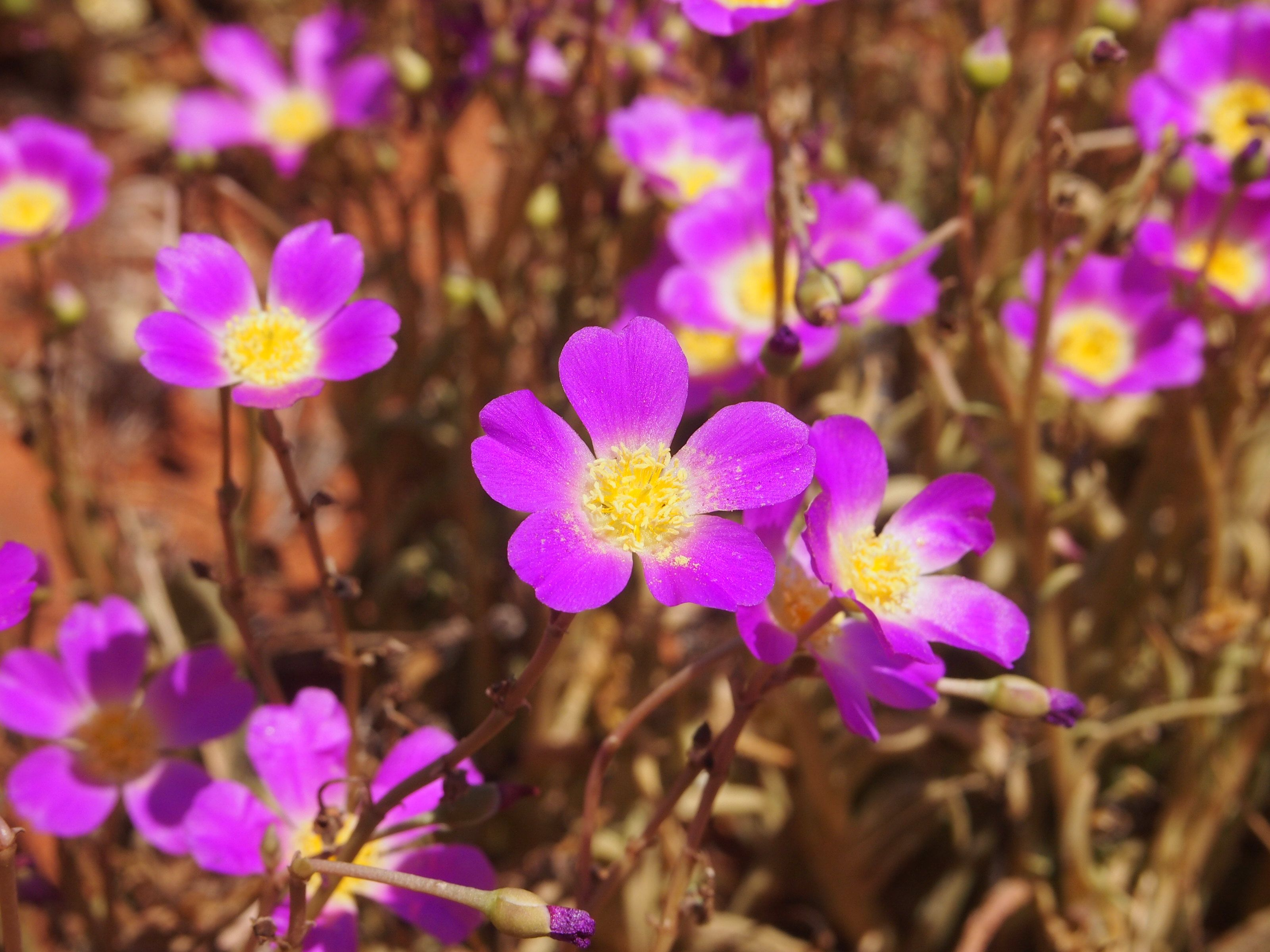
- Parakeelya balonensis

Scientific classification
- Kingdom: Plantae
- Clade: Tracheophytes
- Clade: Angiosperms
- Clade: Eudicots
- Order: Caryophyllales
- Family: Montiaceae
- Genus: Parakeelya; Hershk.

Type species
- Rumicastrum chamaecladum (Diels) Ulbr.

Species
- See text

Synonyms
- Rumicastrum Ulbr.

= Parakeelya =

Genus of plants

Parakeelya is a genus of plants in the family Montiaceae with species native to Australia and New Guinea. These species were formerly classed in genus Calandrinia, which was discovered to be paraphyletic.

== Species ==
The following species are accepted in the genus Parakeelya:

- Parakeelya arenicola (Syeda) Hershk.
- Parakeelya baccata (Obbens) Hershk.
- Parakeelya balonensis (Lindl.) Hershk.
- Parakeelya brevipedata (F.Muell.) Hershk.
- Parakeelya butcherensis (Obbens) Hershk.
- Parakeelya calyptrata (Hook.f.) Hershk.
- Parakeelya chamaeclada (Diels) Hershk.
- Parakeelya composita (Nees) Hershk.
- Parakeelya corrigioloides (F.Muell. ex Benth.) Hershk.
- Parakeelya creethiae (Tratman ex Morrison) Hershk.
- Parakeelya crispisepala (Obbens) Hershk.
- Parakeelya disperma (J.M.Black) Hershk.
- Parakeelya eremaea (Ewart) Hershk.
- Parakeelya flava (Obbens) Hershk.
- Parakeelya gracilis (Benth.) Hershk.
- Parakeelya granulifera (Benth.) Hershk.
- Parakeelya halophila (Albr. & J.G.West) Hershk.
- Parakeelya holtumii (Obbens & L.P.Hancock) Hershk.
- Parakeelya hortiorum (Obbens) Hershk.
- Parakeelya kalanniensis (Obbens) Hershk.
- Parakeelya lefroyensis (Obbens) Hershk.
- Parakeelya lehmannii (Endl.) Hershk.
- Parakeelya liniflora (Fenzl) Hershk.
- Parakeelya machiavelliana Hershk.
- Parakeelya mirabilis (Chinnock & J.G.West) Hershk.
- Parakeelya monosperma (Syeda ex Obbens) Hershk.
- Parakeelya oblonga (Syeda & Carolin) Hershk.
- Parakeelya operta (Obbens) Hershk.
- Parakeelya oraria (Obbens) Hershk.
- Parakeelya papillata (Syeda) Hershk.
- Parakeelya pentavalvis (Obbens) Hershk.
- Parakeelya petrophila (J.G.West & Albr.) Hershk.
- Parakeelya pickeringii (A.Gray) Hershk.
- Parakeelya pleiopetala (F.Muell.) Hershk.
- Parakeelya polyandra (Benth.) Hershk.
- Parakeelya polypetala (Fenzl) Hershk.
- Parakeelya porifera (Syeda) Hershk.
- Parakeelya primuliflora (Diels) Hershk.
- Parakeelya ptychosperma (F.Muell.) Hershk.
- Parakeelya pumila (Benth.) Hershk.
- Parakeelya quadrivalvis (F.Muell.) Hershk.
- Parakeelya quartzitica (Obbens) Hershk.
- Parakeelya remota (J.M.Black) Hershk.
- Parakeelya reticulata (Syeda) Hershk.
- Parakeelya rubrisabulosa (Obbens) Hershk.
- Parakeelya schistorhiza (Morrison) Hershk.
- Parakeelya sculpta (Obbens & J.G.West) Hershk.
- Parakeelya spergularina (F.Muell.) Hershk.
- Parakeelya sphaerophylla (J.M.Black) Hershk.
- Parakeelya stagnensis (J.M.Black) Hershk.
- Parakeelya stenogyna (Domin) Hershk.
- Parakeelya strophiolata (F.Muell.) Hershk.
- Parakeelya tepperiana (W.Fitzg.) Hershk.
- Parakeelya tholiformis (Obbens) Hershk.
- Parakeelya translucens (Obbens) Hershk.
- Parakeelya tumida (Syeda) Hershk.
- Parakeelya umbelliformis (Obbens) Hershk.
- Parakeelya uncinella (Obbens) Hershk.
- Parakeelya uniflora (F.Muell.) Hershk.
- Parakeelya vernicosa (Obbens) Hershk.
- Parakeelya volubilis (Benth.) Hershk.
- Parakeelya wilsonii (Obbens) Hershk.

== Uses ==
Parakeelya balonensis is recorded in the 1889 book The Useful Native Plants of Australia as being called "periculia" by Indigenous Australians and that the plant was eaten by Europeans with bread while Indigenous Australians used it as a food when mixed with baked bark. "The seed is used for making a kind of bread, after the manner of that of Portulaca oleracea. (Mueller, Fragm., x., 71.)."
