= C. rosea =

C. rosea may refer to:

- Canavalia rosea, the beach bean, bay bean, seaside bean, coastal jackbean or MacKenzie bean, a plant species
- Caragana rosea, a plant species in the genus Caragana
- Ceiba rosea, a plant species found in Colombia, Costa Rica and Panama
- Cistanthe rosea, a flowering plant species
- Clonostachys rosea f. rosea, a fungus species
- Coreopsis rosea, the tickseed, a plant species in the family Asteraceae
- Cylindropuntia rosea, the Hudson pear, a cactus species native to Arizona and Mexico

== Synonyms ==
- Clusia rosea, a synonym for Clusia major, a tree species
- Conchocelis rosea, a synonym for the Porphyra alga

== See also ==
- Rosea (disambiguation)
