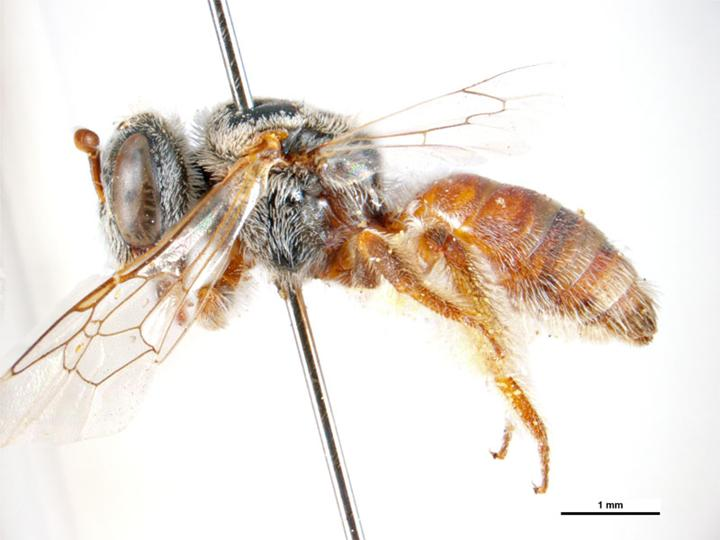
- Female

Scientific classification
- Kingdom: Animalia
- Phylum: Arthropoda
- Clade: Pancrustacea
- Class: Insecta
- Order: Hymenoptera
- Family: Colletidae
- Genus: Leioproctus
- Species: L. finkei

Binomial name
- Leioproctus finkei Michener, 1965: Leioproctus (Microcolletes) finkei Michener, 1965

= Leioproctus finkei =

Species of bee

Leioproctus finkei, or Leioproctus (Minycolletes) finkei, is a species of bee in the family Colletidae and subfamily Colletinae. It is endemic to Australia. It was described by American entomologist Charles Duncan Michener in 1965.

== Etymology ==
The specific epithet finkei refers to the type locality.

== Description ==
The female holotype body length is 6.5 mm, wing length nearly 4.5 mm. Integumental colouration is mainly black, red and brown; the hair is white to grey-brown.

== Distribution and habitat ==
The species occurs in central Australia. The type locality is the Finke River, in the south of the Northern Territory.

== Behaviour ==
The adults are flying mellivores. Flowering plants visited by the bees include Xerochrysum bracteatum and Parakeelya balonensis.

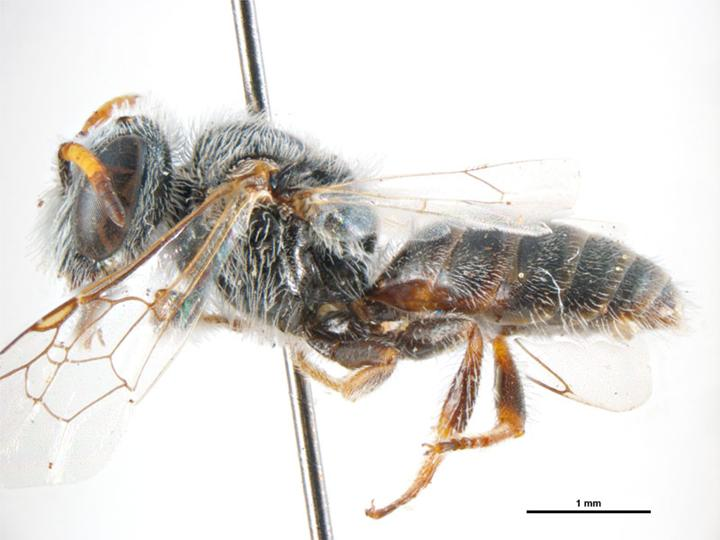
Male
