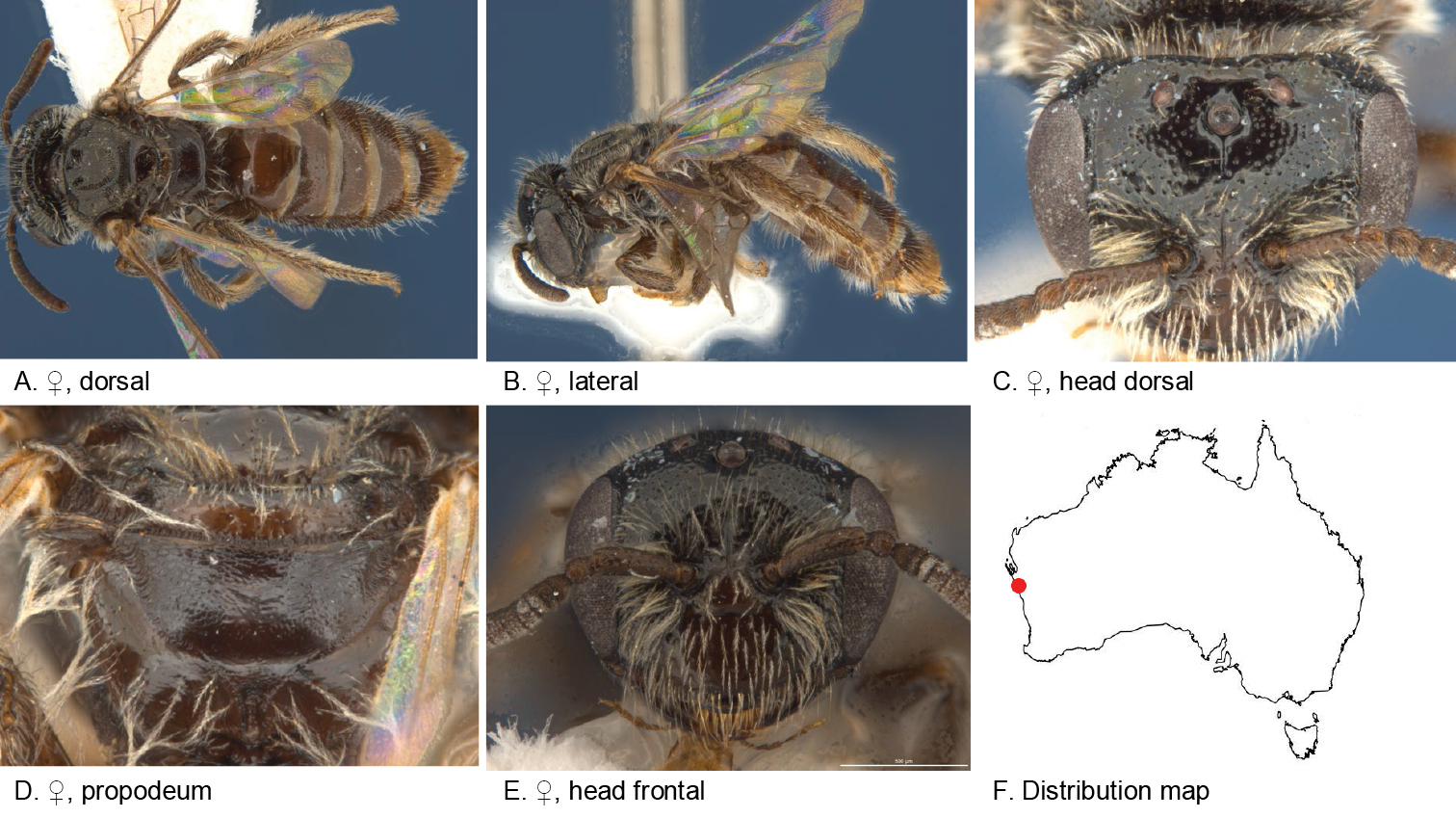
- Female holotype

Scientific classification
- Kingdom: Animalia
- Phylum: Arthropoda
- Clade: Pancrustacea
- Class: Insecta
- Order: Hymenoptera
- Family: Colletidae
- Genus: Leioproctus
- Species: L. nitidifuscus

Binomial name
- Leioproctus nitidifuscus Leijs 2018

= Leioproctus nitidifuscus =

Species of bee

Leioproctus nitidifuscus, or Leioproctus (Colletellus) nitidifuscus, is a species of bee in the family Colletidae and subfamily Colletinae. It is endemic to Australia. It was described by entomologist Remko Leijs in 2018.

== Etymology ==
The specific epithet nitidifuscus refers to the very smooth and brown integument of much of the body.

== Description ==
The female holotype body length is 4.8 mm, head width 1.5 mm. Integumental colouration is mainly black, orange and brown.

== Distribution and habitat ==
The species occurs in Western Australia. The type locality is Kalbarri National Park, in the Mid West region.

== Behaviour ==
The adults are flying mellivores. Flowering plants visited by the bees include Calandrinia species.
