= Talinum gracile =

Talinum gracile is a botanical synonym of two species of plant:

- Calandrinia pilosiuscula, synonym published in 1827 by Augustin Pyramus de Candolle
- Phemeranthus parviflorus, synonym published in 1911 by Robert William Kiger
