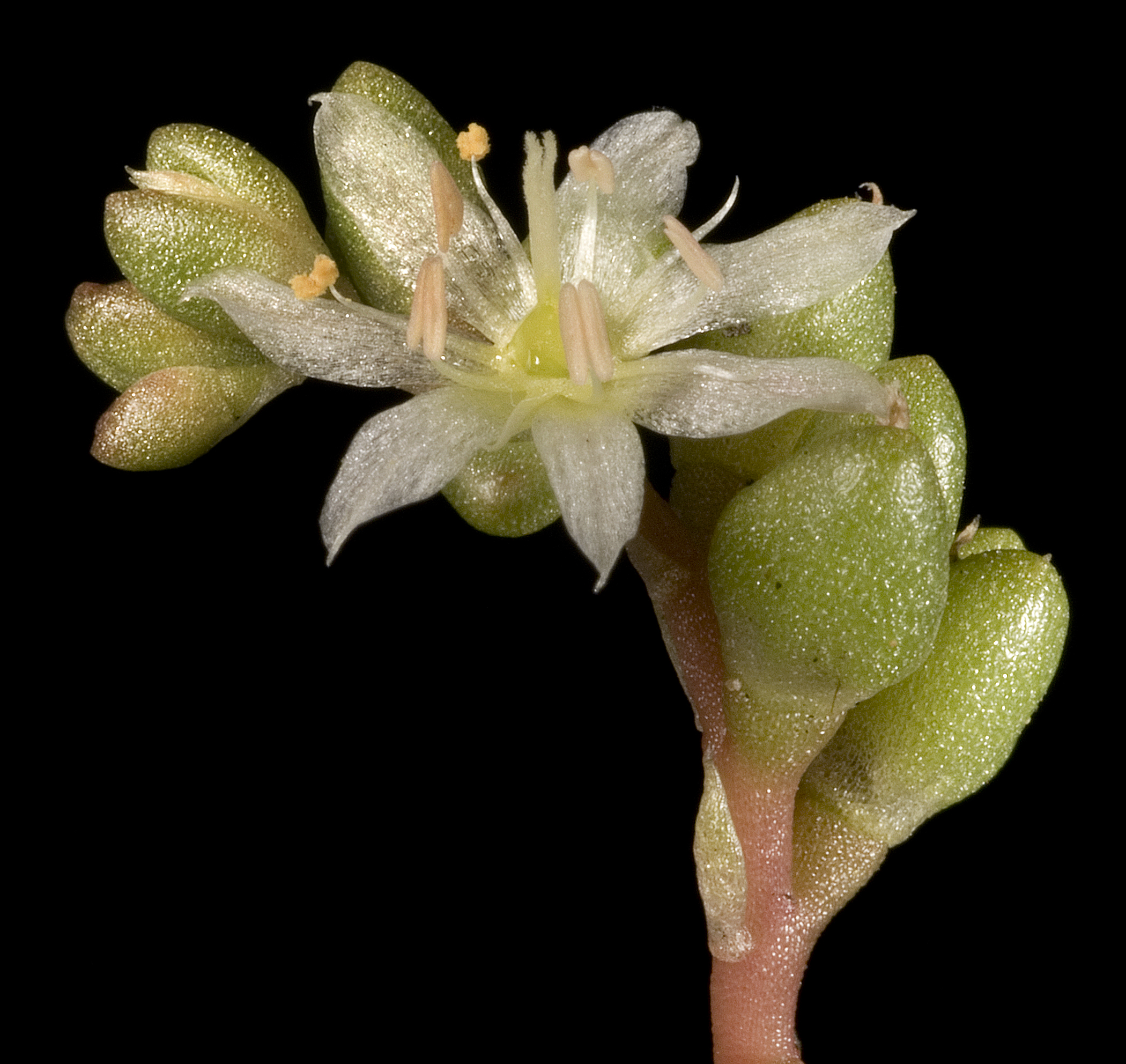

Scientific classification
- Kingdom: Plantae
- Clade: Tracheophytes
- Clade: Angiosperms
- Clade: Eudicots
- Order: Caryophyllales
- Family: Montiaceae
- Genus: Rumicastrum
- Species: R. granuliferum

Binomial name
- Rumicastrum granuliferum (Benth.) Carolin (2020)

Synonyms
- Calandrinia granulifera Benth. (1863); Calandrinia neesiana H.Eichler (1963); Calandrinia pygmaea F.Muell. (1859) nom. inval., nom. illeg., nom. nud.; Claytonia pygmaea (F.Muell.) F.Muell. in Native Pl. Victoria: 133 (1879); Claytonia granulifera (Benth.) F.Muell. (1882); Parakeelya granulifera (Benth.) Hershk. (1998 publ. 1999); Parakeelya nana (Nees) Hershk. (1998 publ. 1999); Talinum nanum Nees (1845)

= Rumicastrum granuliferum =

Species of plant

Rumicastrum granuliferum (synonym Calandrinia granulifera) is an annual herb in the family Montiaceae, and is native to New South Wales, Tasmania, Western Australia, South Australia, and Victoria.

== Description ==
It is a succulent, erect to decumbent herb, flowering from September to November with white-pink flowers. It grows on sandy and gravelly soils on granite outcrops and slopes. The flowers are on pedicels (stems) which are 0.5–2 mm long and erect when in fruit. The bracts are alternate. The sepals are deciduous and 1.5–3 mm long. There are 5-7 petals, 5-10 stamens and 3 stigmas. The black capsule is almost spherical with three short valves which open at the apex only. The numerous, red-brown, shiny seeds are about 0.5 mm long and 0.4 mm wide. For an illustration of the colliculate seeds, see PlantNet.

== Taxonomy ==
The species was first described as Calandrinia granulifera by George Bentham in 1863. The genus Calandrinia was discovered to be paraphyletic, and the Australasian species were moved to genus Rumicastrum in 2020.
