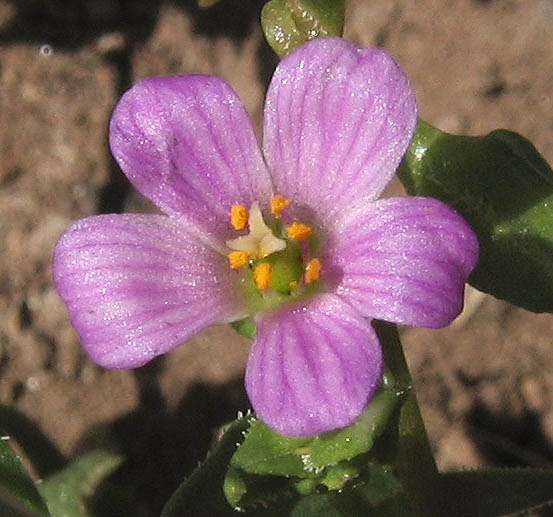

Conservation status
- Apparently Secure (NatureServe)

Scientific classification
- Kingdom: Plantae
- Clade: Tracheophytes
- Clade: Angiosperms
- Clade: Eudicots
- Order: Caryophyllales
- Family: Montiaceae
- Genus: Calandrinia
- Species: C. breweri

Binomial name
- Calandrinia breweri S.Wats.

= Calandrinia breweri =

Species of flowering plant

Calandrinia breweri is a species of flowering plant in the family Montiaceae known by the common name Brewer's redmaids.

It is native to the coastal mountains and canyons of California and Baja California, where it grows in several types of habitat, including recently burned and otherwise disturbed areas.

== Description ==
Calandrinia breweri is an annual herb producing thick, hairless stems up to 45 centimeters long which may grow upright or sprawl along the ground. The thick leaves are oval to spoon-shaped and up to 8 centimeters long. Flowers bloom March to May.

The inflorescence is a raceme of bright red to pink flowers, each on a long pedicel. Each flower has generally five petals which are under half a centimeter long.

The fruit is a capsule containing 10 to 15 seeds which are finely bumpy under magnification.
