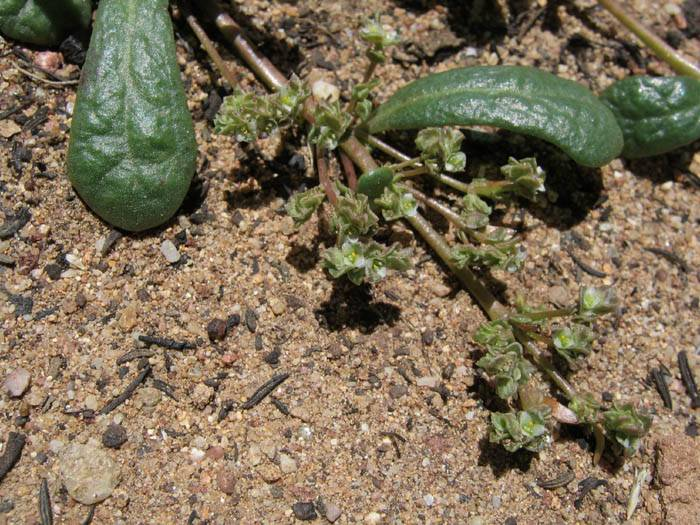

Conservation status
- Secure (NatureServe)

Scientific classification
- Kingdom: Plantae
- Clade: Tracheophytes
- Clade: Angiosperms
- Clade: Eudicots
- Order: Caryophyllales
- Family: Montiaceae
- Genus: Calyptridium
- Species: C. monandrum

Binomial name
- Calyptridium monandrum Nutt.

Synonyms
- Cistanthe monandra (Nutt.)Hershk.

= Calyptridium monandrum =

Species of flowering plant

Calyptridium monandrum, synonym Cistanthe monandra, is a species of flowering plant in the family Montiaceae known by the common name common pussypaws.

The plant is native to the Southwestern United States, Southern California, and adjacent Baja California, where it grows in sandy areas such as deserts and coastal and mountain scrub habitats.

== Description ==
Calyptridium monandrum is a fleshy, flat annual herb producing short stems which extend along the ground or spread upright from a small taproot. Thick, spoon-shaped leaves occur in a basal rosette at the base of the stem, reaching up to about 5 cm in length. There are smaller leaves along the stems.

Small inflorescences sprout from the stem bearing many flowers, each with fleshy, triangular sepals and three pink or red petals only a few millimeters long. The fruit is a translucent, oblong capsule up to six millimeters long containing several shiny, black seeds.
