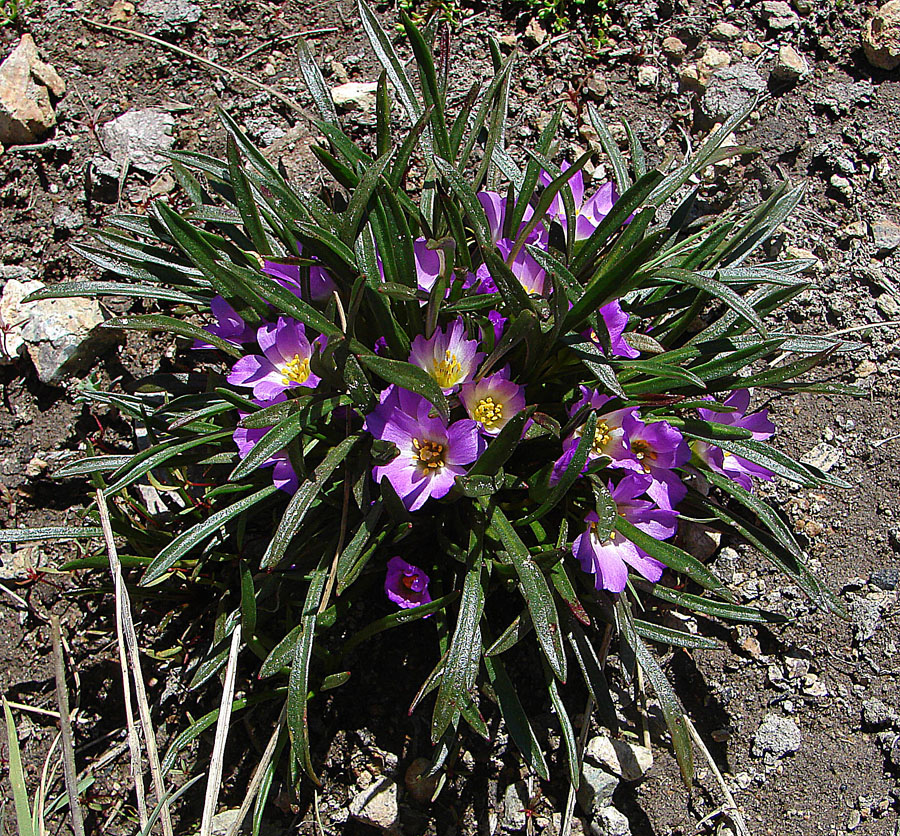
- Calandrinia colchaguensis

Scientific classification
- Kingdom: Plantae
- Clade: Tracheophytes
- Clade: Angiosperms
- Clade: Eudicots
- Order: Caryophyllales
- Family: Montiaceae
- Genus: Calandrinia; Kunth

Synonyms
- Baitaria Ruiz & Pav.; Cosmia Dombey ex Juss.; Diazia Phil.; Monocosmia Fenzl; Phacosperma Haw.

= Calandrinia =

Genus of flowering plants

Calandrinia is a genus of flowering plants known as purslanes and redmaids. It includes 37 species of annual and perennial herbs which bear colourful flowers in shades of red to purple and white. Species of this genus are native to the Americas, including western and southern South America, Central America, and western North America. Some species have been introduced to parts of Australia, New Zealand, southern Africa, Asia, and Europe. Over 60 species native to Australia and New Guinea that were formerly included in Calandrinia are now placed in a separate genus, Rumicastrum or Parakeelya. A single eastern Australian species named in 2022, Calandrinia petrophila, is still included in Calandrinia, but will be placed into the Australian genus when the name of the new genus is finally settled.

== Description ==
Species in the genus Calandrinia are annual or perennial herbaceous plants with a sprawling or erect habit. The leaves are mostly basal and may be either alternate or opposite in arrangement. Flowers are produced in cymes. Each flower produces between four and eleven petals, though often five. Flowers may be white, purple, pink, red, or yellow.

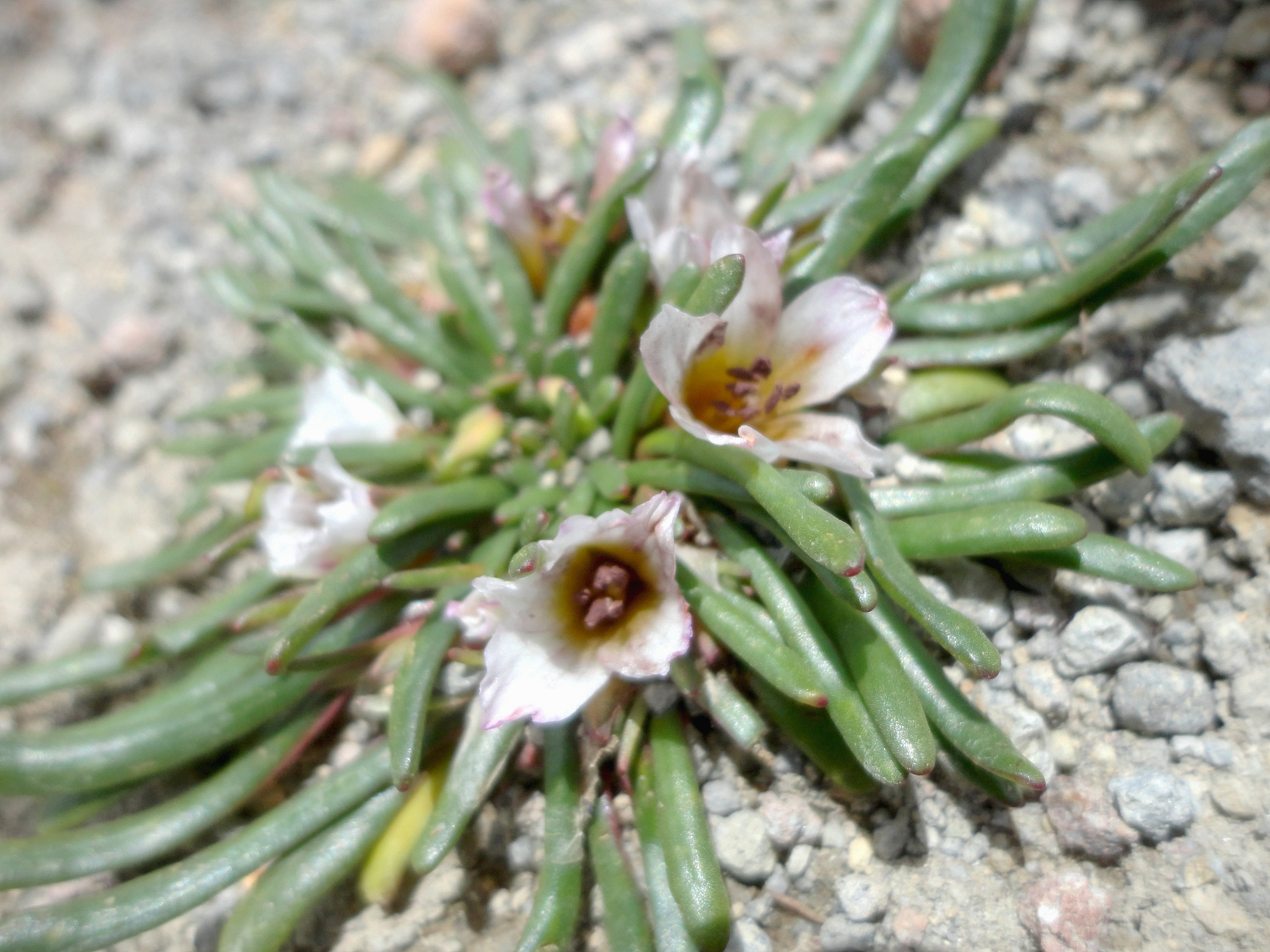
Calandrinia acaulis

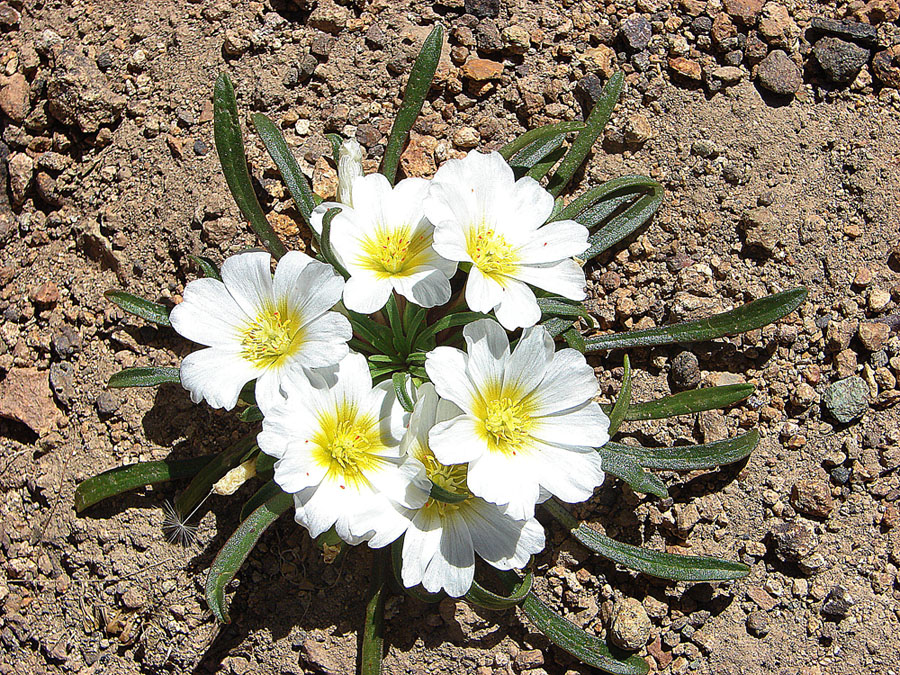
Calandrinia affinis

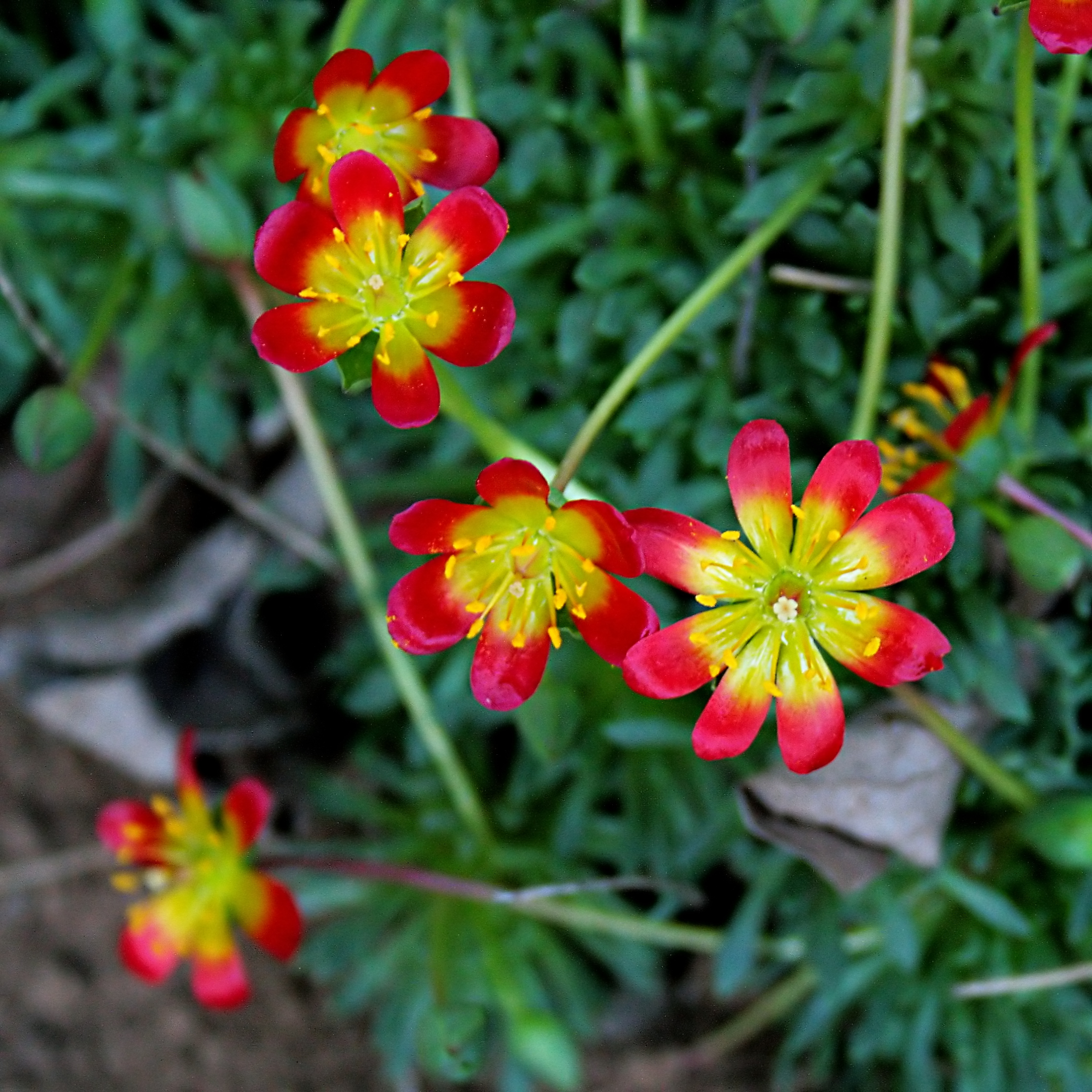
Calandrinia caespitosa

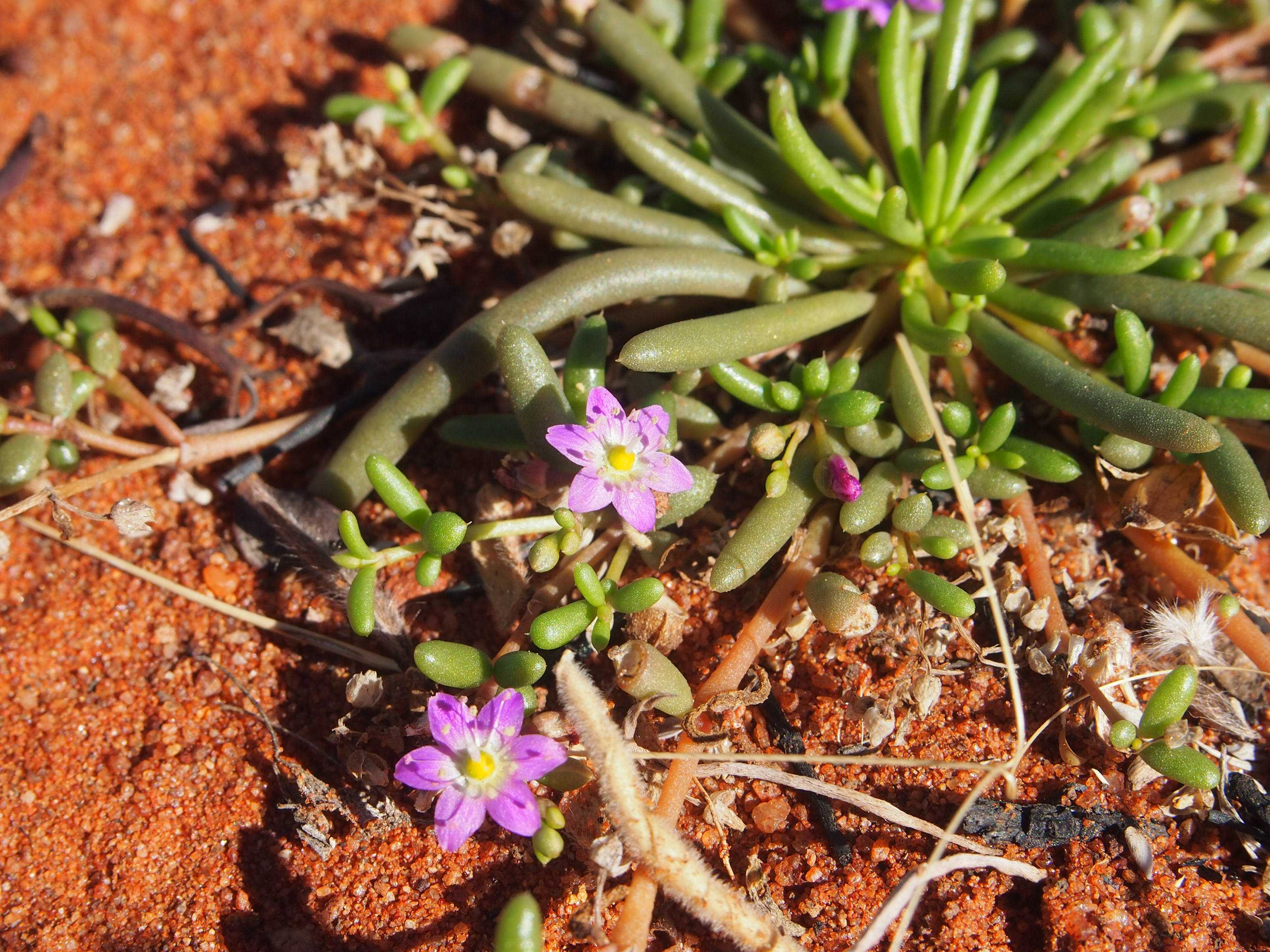
Calandrinia stagnensis

== Taxonomy ==
The genus Calandrinia was erected in 1823 by German botanist Carl Sigismund Kunth. It was named for Jean Louis Calandrini (1703–1758), a Genevan botanist.

Approximately 74 Calandrinia species are native to Australia. Along with the pigweeds (Portulaca species), Calandrinia are the most prominent succulent species in Australia. The Australian Calandrinia were traditionally considered to be monophyletic (share the same ancestry) with 14 Calandrinia species from the Americas, and are still classified as belonging to the same genus. However, in 1987 Australian taxonomist Roger Carolin proposed that the American and Australian Calandrinia are not closely related to each other based on morphological analyses. Follow-up studies also supported two different lineages, based in part on the absence of Calandrinia on islands along possible dispersal pathways between South America and Australia and in part on genomic data.

Despite this, the nomenclature has not been officially changed for all Australian Calandrinia, including C. balonensis. Although the need for a nomenclature change is widely agreed, a debate has arisen over the appropriate naming of the Australian Calandrinia. A proposal has been made to rename the genus as Parakeelya on the grounds that it is used as a common name for the whole genus, derives from South Australian and Central Desert Indigenous names, and is already accepted as a synonym for some Australian species. The competing view holds that the Australian genus should be named Rumicastrum according to established nomenclatural rules. Plants of the World Online accepts Rumicastrum. The proposal to rename Calandrinia as Parakeelya has not yet been decided.

The genus is classified in the family Montiaceae. It was previously placed in the purslane family, Portulacaceae.

== Species ==
As of December 2024, the following species are accepted in the genus Calandrinia:

- Calandrinia acaulis Kunth
- Calandrinia affinis Gillies ex Arn.
- Calandrinia alba (Ruiz & Pav.) DC.
- Calandrinia bracteosa Phil.
- Calandrinia breweri S.Watson – Brewer's redmaid; California and Baja California
- Calandrinia caespitosa Gillies ex Arn.
- Calandrinia carolinii Hershk. & D.I.Ford
- Calandrinia ciliata (Ruiz & Pav.) DC. – fringed redmaid
- Calandrinia colchaguensis Barnéoud
- Calandrinia compacta Barnéoud
- Calandrinia corymbosa Walp.
- Calandrini comepressa Phil.
- Calandrinia filifolia Rydb.
- Calandrinia fuegiana Gand.
- Calandrinia galapagosa H.St.John Galápagos Islands
- Calandrinia graminifolia Phil.
- Calandrinia heterophylla Rydb.
- Calandrinia involucrata Phil.
- Calandrinia jompomae Hershk.
- Calandrinia lancifolia Phil.
- Calandrinia leucopogon Phil.
- Calandrinia minutissima Barnéoud
- Calandrinia monandra (Ruiz & Pav.) DC.
- Calandrinia nana Phil.
- Calandrinia nitida (Ruiz & Pav.) DC.
- Calandrinia pauciflora Phil.
- Calandrinia pilosiuscula DC.
- Calandrinia poeppigiana Walp.
- Calandrinia polyclados Phil.
- Calandrinia ranunculina J.M.Watson, A.R.Flores & Elvebakk
- Calandrinia sanguinea Phil.
- Calandrinia skottsbergii Gand.
- Calandrinia solisi Phil.
- Calandrinia spicigera Phil.
- Calandrinia taltalensis I.M.Johnst.
- Calandrinia villaroelii Phil.

=== Formerly placed here ===
The following species were formerly placed in genus Calandrinia, including the Australasian species now placed in genus Rumicastrum.

- Anacampseros australiana J.M.Black (as C. pogonophora F.Muell.)
- Cistanthe arenaria (Cham.) Carolin ex Hershk. (as C. arenaria Cham. or C. glaucopurpurea Reiche)
- Cistanthe crassifolia (Phil.) Carolin ex Hershk. (as C. crassifolia Phil.)
- Cistanthe densiflora (Barnéoud) Hershk. (as C. densiflora Barnéoud or C. spicata Phil.)
- Cistanthe grandiflora (Lindl.) Schltdl. (as C. grandiflora Lindl. or C. spectabilis Otto & A.Dietr.)
- Cistanthe litoralis (Phil.) Carolin ex Hershk. (as C. litoralis Phil.)
- Cistanthe mucronulata (Meyen) Carolin ex Hershk. (as C. mucronata Meyen)
- Cistanthe picta (Gillies ex Arn.) Carolin ex Hershk. (as C. picta Gillies ex Arn. or C. villanuevae Phil.)
- Cistanthe sitiens (I.M.Johnst.) J.M.Watson & A.R.Flores (as C. sitiens I.M.Johnst.)
- Montiopsis andicola (Gillies) D.I.Ford (as C. andicola Gillies or C. tricolor Phil.)
- Montiopsis conferta (Gillies ex Arn.) Peralta (as C. conferta Gillies ex Arn., C. caesia F.Phil. ex Phil., or C. hirtella Phil.)
- Montiopsis gayana (Barnéoud) D.I.Ford (as C. calycotricha Phil.)
- Montiopsis gilliesii (Hook. & Arn.) D.I.Ford (as C. gilliesii Hook. & Arn. or C. leucotricha Phil.)
- Montiopsis potentilloides (Barnéoud) D.I.Ford (as C. potentilloides Barnéoud or C. setosa Phil.)
- Rumicastrum arenicolum (Syeda) Hershk. (as C. arenicola Syeda)
- Rumicastrum baccatum (Obbens) Hershk. (as C. baccata Obbens)
- Rumicastrum balonense (Lindl.) Carolin – broadleaf parakeelya (as C. balonensis Lindl.)
- Rumicastrum brevipedatum (F. Muell.) Carolin (as C. brevipedata F.Muell.)
- Rumicastrum butcherense (Obbens) Hershk. (as C. butcherense Obbens)
- Rumicastrum calyptratum (Hook. f.) Carolin – pink purslane (as C. calyptratum Hook.f.)
- Rumicastrum compositum (Nees) Carolin (as C. composita (Nees) Benth.)
- Rumicastrum corrigioloides (F. Muell. ex Benth.) Carolin – strap purslane (as C. corrigioloides F.Muell. ex Benth.)
- Rumicastrum creethae (Tratman ex Morrison) Carolin (as C. creethae Tratman ex Morrison)
- Rumicastrum crispisepalum (Obbens) Hershk. (as C. crispipetala Obbens)
- Rumicastrum cygnorum (Diels) Carolin (as C. cygnorum Diels)
- Rumicastrum cylindricum (Poelln.) Carolin (as C. cylindrica Poelln.)
- Rumicastrum dielsii (Poelln.) Carolin (as C. dielsii Poelln.)
- Rumicastrum dipetalum (J.M.Black) Carolin (as C. dipetala J.M.Black)
- Rumicastrum dispermum (J.M.Black) Carolin (as C. disperma J.M.Black)
- Rumicastrum eremaeum (Ewart) Carolin – twining purslane (as C. eremaea Ewart)
- Rumicastrum flavum (Obbens) Hershk. (as C. flava Obbens)
- Rumicastrum gracile (Benth.) Carolin (as C. gracilis Benth.)
- Rumicastrum granuliferum (Benth.) Carolin – pygmy purslane (as C. granulifera Benth.)
- Rumicastrum holtumii (Obbens & L.P.Hancock) Hershk. (as C. holtumii Obbens & L.P.Hancock)
- Rumicastrum hortiorum (Obbens) Hershk. (as C. hortiurum Obbens}
- Rumicastrum kalanniense (Obbens) Hershk. (as C. kalanniensis Obbens)
- Rumicastrum liniflorum (Fenzl) Carolin (as C. liniflora Fenzl)
- Rumicastrum maryonii (S. Moore) Carolin (as C. maryonii S.Moore)
- Rumicastrum mirabile (Chinnock & J.G.West) Hershk. (as C. mirabilis Chinnock & J.G.West)
- Rumicastrum monogynum (Poelln.) Carolin (as C. monogyne Poelln.)
- Rumicastrum monospermum (Syeda ex Obbens) Hershk. (as C. monosperma Syeda ex Obbens)
- Rumicastrum morrisae (Goy) Carolin (as C. morrisae Goy)
- Rumicastrum oblongum (Syeda & Carolin) Hershk. (as C. oblonga Syeda & Carolin)
- Rumicastrum opertum (Obbens)Hershk. (as C. operta Obbens)
- Rumicastrum orarium (Obbens) Hershk. (as C. oraria Obbens)
- Rumicastrum papillatum (Syeda) Carolin (as C. papillata Syeda)
- Rumicastrum pentavalvis (Obbens) Hershk. (as C.pentavalve Obbens)
- Rumicastrum pickeringii (A. Gray) Carolin (as C. pickeringii A.Gray
- Rumicastrum pleiopetalum (F.Muell.) Carolin (as C. pleiopetala F.Muell.)
- Rumicastrum polyandrum (Benth.) Carolin (as C. polyandra Benth.)
- Rumicastrum polypetalum (Fenzl) Carolin (as C. polypetala Fenzl)
- Rumicastrum poriferum (Syeda) Carolin (as C. porifera Syeda)
- Rumicastrum primuliflorum (Diels) Carolin (as C. primuliflora Diels)
- Rumicastrum ptychospermum (F. Muell.) Carolin (as C. ptychosperma F.Muell.)
- Rumicastrum pumilum (Benth.) Carolin (as C. pumila (Benth.) F.Muell.
- Rumicastrum quadrivalve (F.Muell.) Carolin (as C. quadrivalvis F.Muell.)
- Rumicastrum quartziticum (Obbens) Hershk. (as C. quartzitica Obbens)
- Rumicastrum remotum (J.M.Black) Carolin (as C. remota J.M.Black)
- Rumicastrum reticulatum (Syeda) Carolin (as C. reticulata Syeda)
- Rumicastrum rubrisabulosum (Obbens) Hershk. (as C. rubrisabulosa Obbens)
- Rumicastrum schistorhizum (Morrison) Carolin (as C. schistorhiza Morrison)
- Rumicastrum sculptum (Obbens) Hershk. (as C. sculpta Obbens & J.G.West)
- Rumicastrum spergularinum (F.Muell.) Carolin (as C. spergularina F.Muell.)
- Rumicastrum sphaerophyllum (J.M.Black) Carolin (as C. sphaerophylla J.M.Black)
- Rumicastrum stagnense (J.M.Black) Carolin (as C. stagnensis J.M.Black)
- Rumicastrum stenogynum (Domin) Carolin (as C. stenogyna Domin)
- Rumicastrum strophiolatum (F.Muell.) Carolin (as C. strophiolata (F.Muell.) F.Muell. ex B.D.Jacks.)
- Rumicastrum tepperianum (W.Fitzg.) Carolin (as C. tepperiana W.Fitzg.)
- Rumicastrum tholiforme (Obbens) Hershk. (as C. tholiformis Obbens)
- Rumicastrum translucens (Obbens) Hershk. (as C.translucens Obbens)
- Rumicastrum tumidum (Syeda) Hershk. (as C. tumida Syeda)
- Rumicastrum umbelliforme (Obbens) Hershk. (as C. umbelliformis Obbens)
- Rumicastrum uniflorum (F. Muell.) Carolin (as C. uniflore F.Muell.)
- Rumicastrum vernicosum (Obbens) Hershk. (as C. vernicosa Obbens)
- Rumicastrum volubile (Benth.) Carolin (as C. volubilis Benth.)
- Rumicastrum wilsonii (Obbens) Hershk. (as C. wilsonii Obbens)
