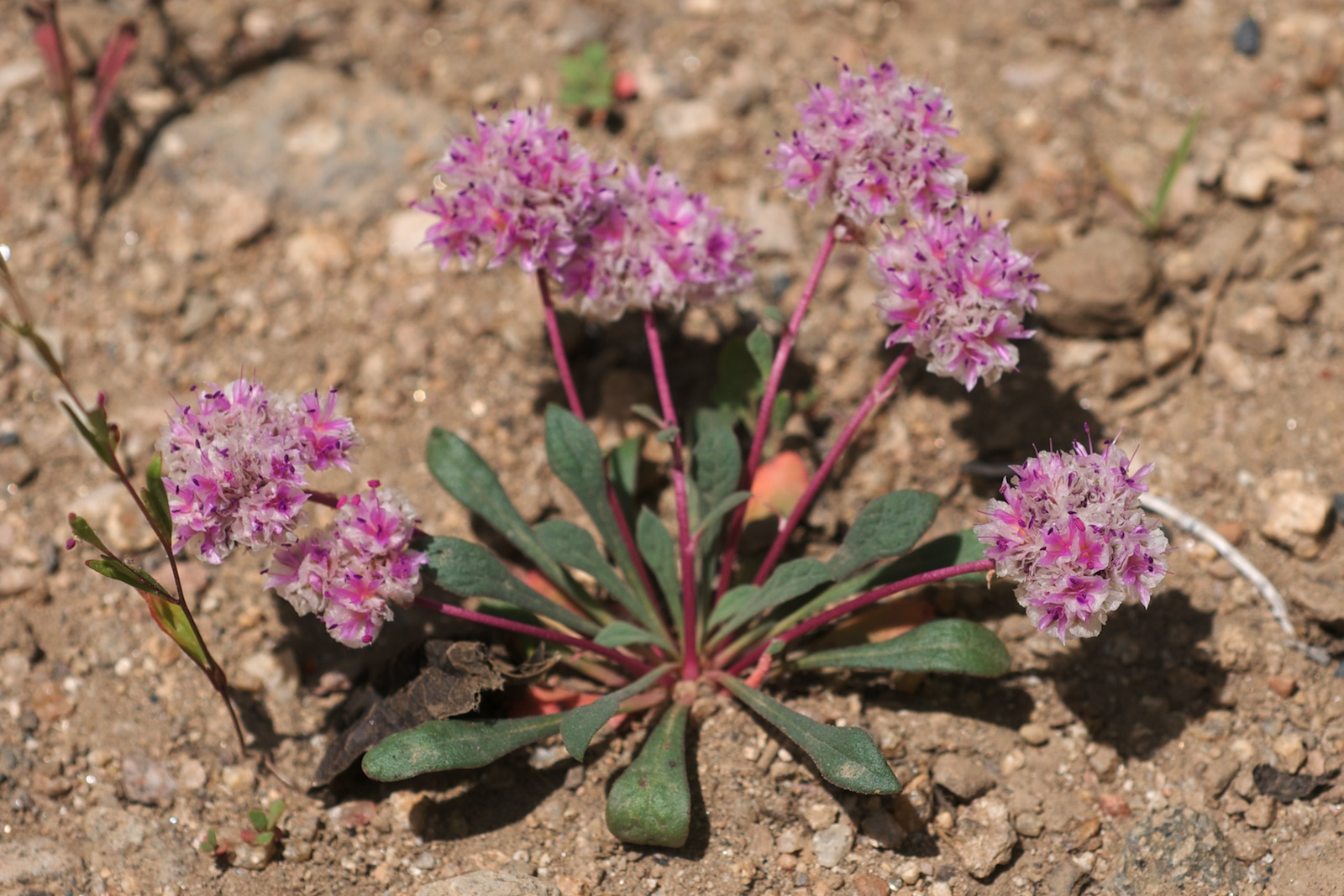

Scientific classification
- Kingdom: Plantae
- Clade: Tracheophytes
- Clade: Angiosperms
- Clade: Eudicots
- Order: Caryophyllales
- Family: Montiaceae
- Genus: Calyptridium
- Species: C. monospermum

Binomial name
- Calyptridium monospermum Greene

Synonyms
- Cistanthe monosperma (Greene) Hershk.

= Calyptridium monospermum =

Species of flowering plant

Calyptridium monospermum, synonym Cistanthe monosperma, is a perennial plant in the miner's lettuce family (Montiaceae), known by the common name one-seeded pussypaws. It was formerly classified in the purslane family (Portulacaceae).

== Range and habitat ==
It is native to western North America from Oregon to Baja California, where it grows in a number of habitat types, including forest and woodland.

== Growth pattern, leaves, and stems ==
It is a perennial herb growing from a thick caudex and a taproot. It grows somewhat upright, the plant approaching half a meter in maximum length. There is a basal rosette of thick, generally spoon-shaped leaves up to about 6 centimeters long, with a few smaller leaves along the stems.

C. monospermum usually has more than one inflorescence per basal rosette; the related C. umbellatum generally has only one.

== Inflorescence and fruit ==
The inflorescence is an erect umbel up to 10 centimeters wide. The four petals on each flower are white to pink, and are surrounded closely by round, frilly sepals. The fruit is a small, round capsule a few millimeters wide.

It blooms from April to September.
