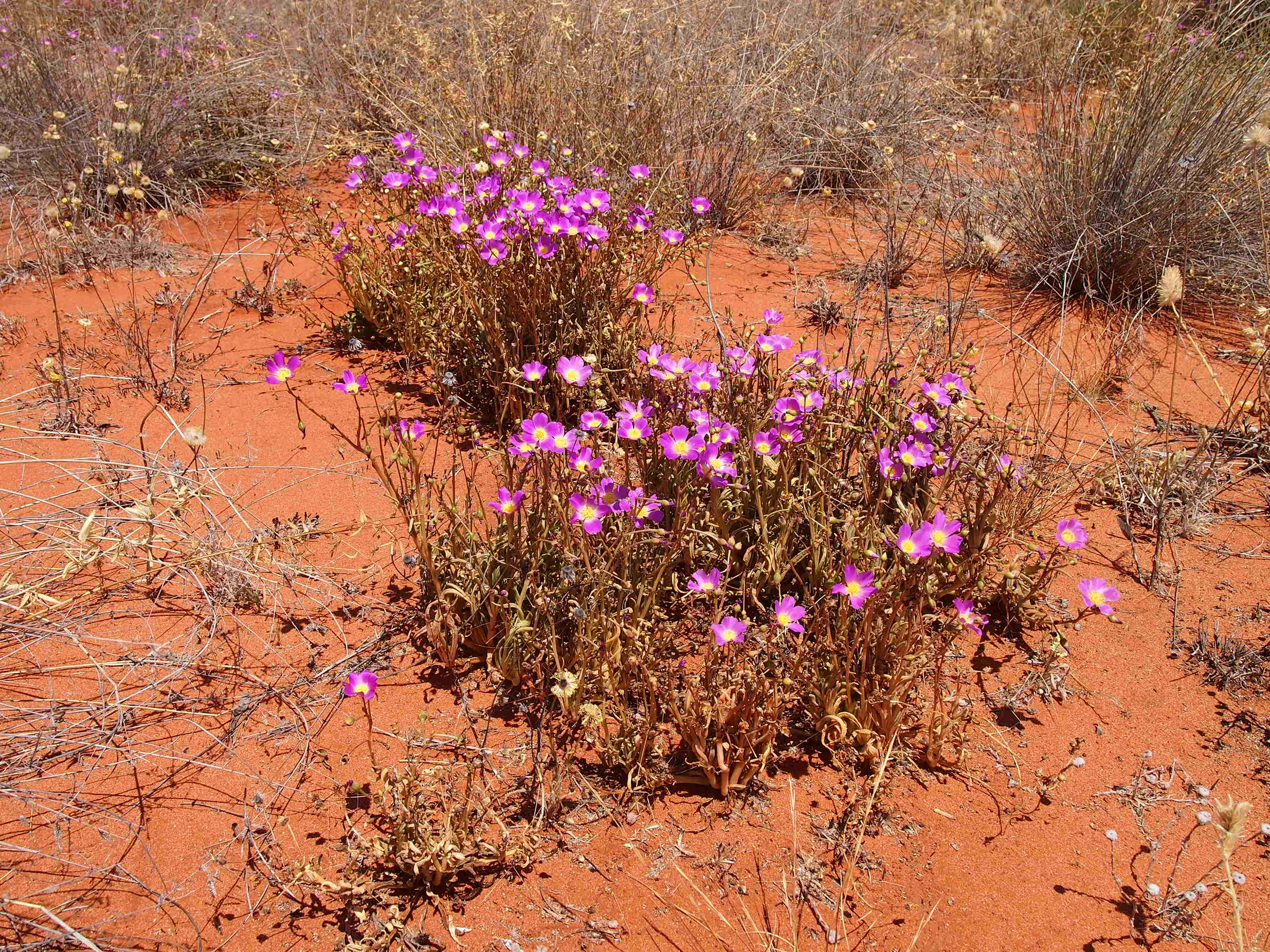

Scientific classification
- Kingdom: Plantae
- Clade: Tracheophytes
- Clade: Angiosperms
- Clade: Eudicots
- Order: Caryophyllales
- Family: Montiaceae
- Genus: Parakeelya
- Species: P. balonensis

Binomial name
- Parakeelya balonensis (Lindl.) Hershk.
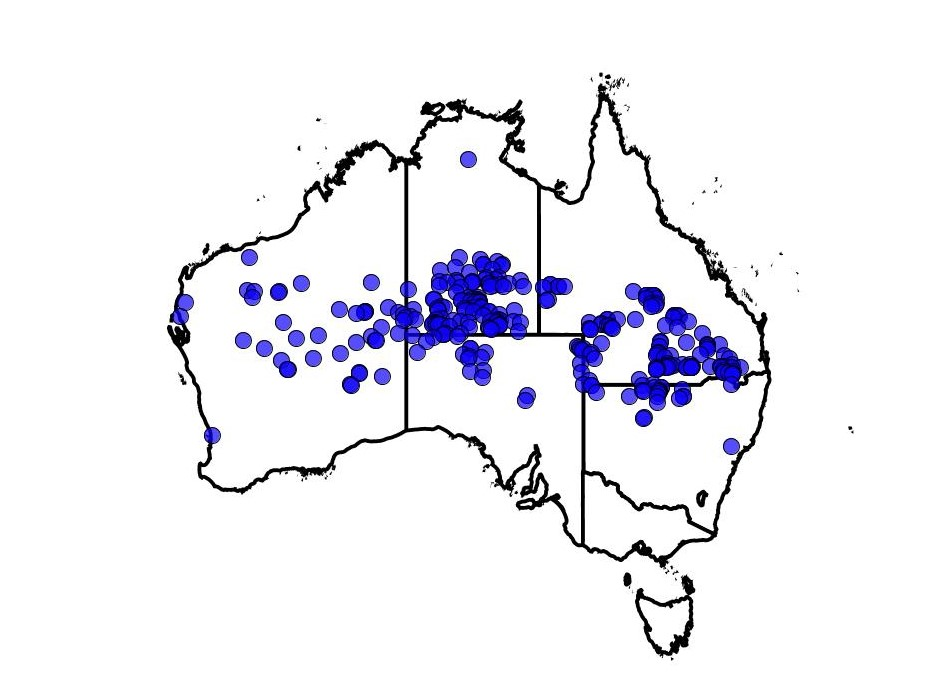
- Occurrence data from AVH

Synonyms
- Calandrinia balonensis Lindl.; Claytonia balonensis (Lindl.) Tate; Rumicastrum balonense (Lindl.) Carolin

= Parakeelya balonensis =

Species of plant

Parakeelya balonensis (synonym Calandrinia balonensis) is a species of succulent plant native to arid and semi-arid regions of Australia. Common names for the plant include parakeelya, broad-leaf parakeelya, broad-leaved parakeelya and Balonne parakeelya. Parakeelya derives from one of the many Aboriginal Australian names for the plant. The scientific name for the species comes from the Balonne River in Queensland, where the first specimen was found. Calandrinia, its former genus, is named for Jean Louis Calandrini, a 19th-century Genevan professor and botanical author, P. balonensis is marketed as a garden plant under the name Calandrinia ‘Mystique’.

== Description ==
P. balonensis is a succulent annual herb with bright green foliage that grows in a spreading form up to 60 cm across, with erect leafy flower-stems to 30 cm high. The leaves are fleshy, approximately 5 to 20 mm wide and 20 to 100 mm long, with a groove running lengthwise along the middle of the upper surface. Although leaves appear almost flat when viewed from above, if the leaf is turned over to display the underside, its succulence is apparent. Leaves form a rosette at the base of the plant and extend up the flower-stems.

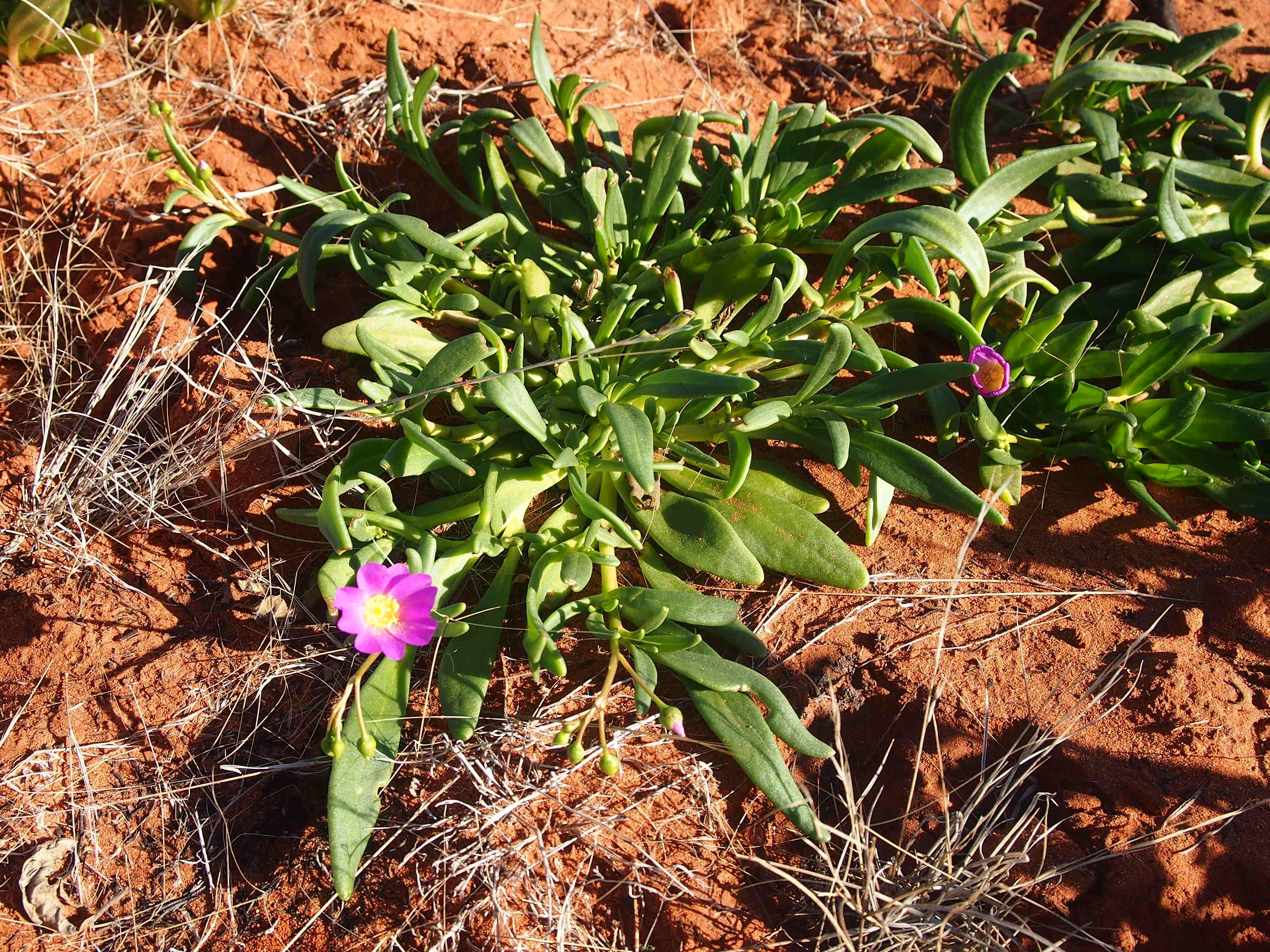
P. balonensis foliage

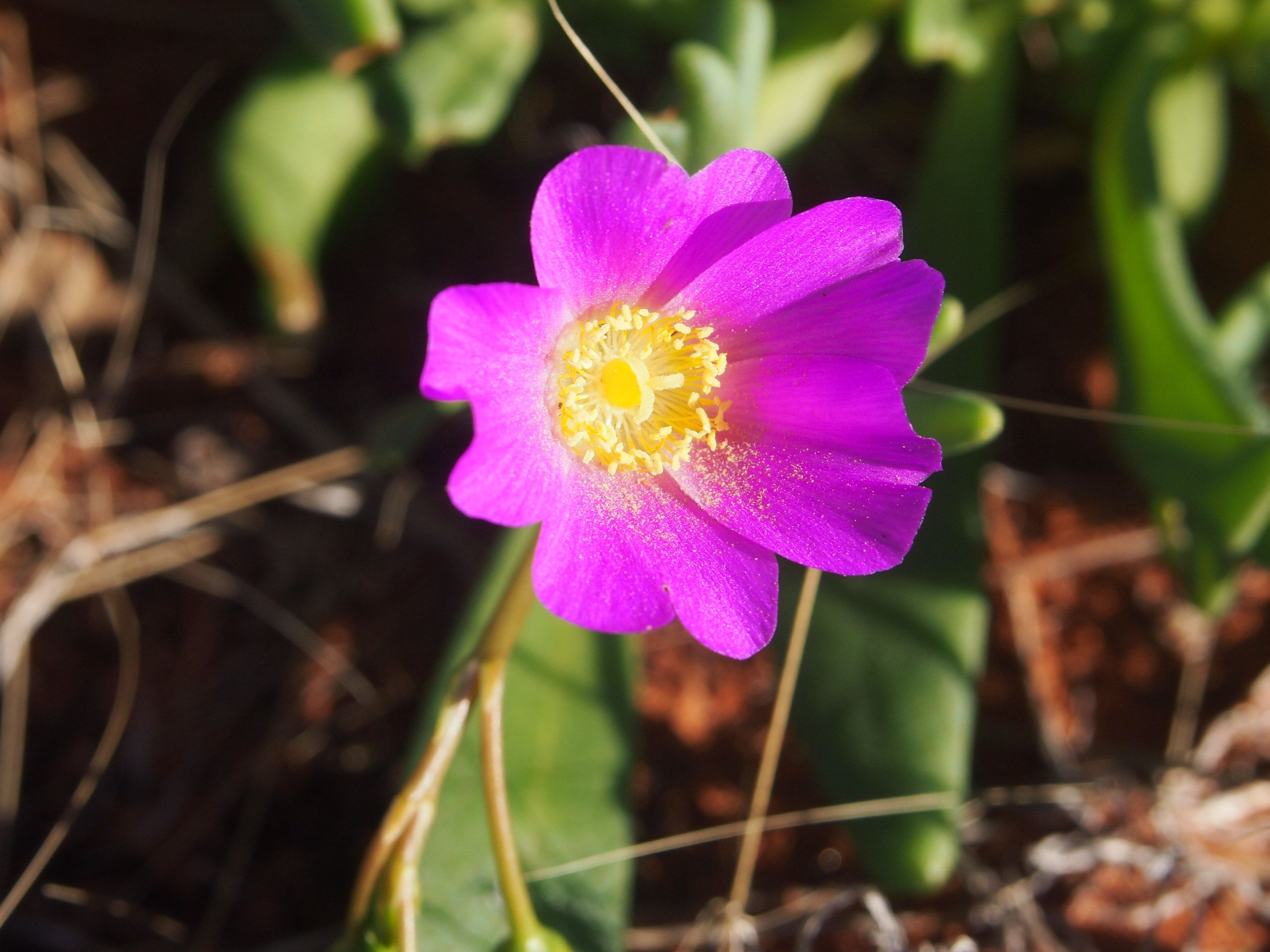
P. balonensis flower

There are three to four flowers at the top of each stem or on short leafy branches. Flowers are vivid dark pink or purple with five petals 11 to 15 mm long and bright yellow stamens in the center. The flowers open during the day and close just before sunset. The fruit is a small capsule that contains numerous dark-red seeds. The capsule is 5 to 9 mm long and 4 to 7 mm wide, and the seeds are at least 1 mm in diameter.

== Taxonomy ==
P. balonensis is one of 62 Parakeelya species, which are native to Australia, New Guinea, and Tasmania. Along with the pigweeds (Portulaca species), Parakeelya are the most prominent succulent species in Australia. The Rumicastrum species were formerly classified in genus Calandrinia and considered to be monophyletic (share the same ancestry) with the 14 Calandrinia species from the Americas. However, in 1987 Australian taxonomist Roger Carolin proposed that the American and Australian Calandrinia are not closely related to each other based on morphological analyses. Follow-up studies also supported two different lineages, based in part on the absence of Calandrinia on islands along possible dispersal pathways between South America and Australia and in part on genomic data.

Although the need for a nomenclature change was widely agreed, a debate arose over the appropriate naming of the Australasian Calandrinia, and the new genus name is not universally agreed to. A proposal was made to rename the genus as Parakeelya on the grounds that it is used as a common name for the whole genus, derives from South Australian and Central Desert Indigenous names, and is already accepted as a synonym for some Australian species. In 2020 Mark Hershkovitz, the author of Parakeelya, published a paper arguing that the Australasian species should be reclassified into genus Rumicastrum according to established nomenclatural rules. Plants of the World Online accepts Parakeelya. Other sources are undecided.

== Distribution and habitat ==
P. balonensis is widely distributed in the arid and semi-arid zones of New South Wales, the Northern Territory, Queensland, South Australia, and Western Australia. It is most common on sandplains, sand dunes and rises and along sandy intermittent watercourses. It is less frequently found on gravelly hills of neutral or acidic rocks. The plant occurs in association with mulga and poplar box woodlands and in spinifex communities.

== Ecology ==
The distinctive features and life history of P. balonensis reflect the requirements of its distribution in dry regions. The most noticeable of these features is succulence, an evolutionary strategy in which plants’ leaves or roots are thickened, fleshy, and engorged to retain water in arid climates or soil conditions. Although succulence is rare among Australian plants when compared to arid regions in the Americas and Africa, it is a defining characteristic of Parakeelya and Calandrinia. P. balonensis has “leaf succulence,” in which the majority of its water reserves are stored in the leaves. P. balonensis utilises crassulean acid metabolism (CAM) at a low level. In CAM photosynthesis, plants can obtain carbon dioxide by opening their stomata at night when water loss is reduced. Carbon dioxide absorbed at night is stored in dilute form in the succulent tissues until daylight, when photosynthesis is completed. Like other Parakeelya with CAM, P. balonensis obtains most of its carbon through daytime photosynthesis, unlike some other well-known succulents such as cacti that may obtain most or all required carbon at night.

P. balonensis has been classified as a “drought evader,” a short-lived plant that spends most of its life as a dormant seed or a small plant, until a large rainfall event triggers germination or growth, in contrast to “drought tolerators” which are perennial plants that can survive long periods without rainfall. In drier periods P. balonensis can grow as a small single rosette. After significant rainfall it rapidly develops from this single rosette to a large green mass of leaves and stems that can carpet the sandplains and dunes with massed, colourful displays. It tends to last longer than most arid or semi-arid zone annuals because of its ability to store water in its succulent leaves. P. balonensis may flower any month but is most commonly reported to do so in spring.

== Uses ==
P. balonensis was an important food for Aboriginal people in Central Australia. Pitjantjatjara people steam the leaves, roots and stems before eating, and would eat the succulent leaves raw for their moisture content in an emergency. The small black seeds can be ground into a paste that is rich in protein (14.6 percent) and fat (17 percent), but gathering the seeds in useful quantities is labour-intensive.

The widespread use of P. balonensis is reflected in numerous terms for it in Aboriginal languages:

- Alyawarr: alyemp-alyemp, lywemp-lywemp
- Anmatyerr: arrwelty-arrwelty, lywemp
- Eastern Arrernte: lyempe-lyempe, parrkelye
- Western Arrernte: ilkngwalye
- Pintupi: kumuḻ-kumuḻpa
- Pitjanjatjara: nurngi, parkilypa, tjuṉngi
- Warlpiri: parrkilyi, patanjarnngi

P. balonensis leaves were also a food source for European settlers and explorers. Alice Duncan-Kemp, an author and Indigenous culture recorder, described P. balonensis as palatable when cooked and dressed with seasoning or white sauce.

P. balonensis is considered a palatable and useful forage species for sheep and cattle. Some Parakeelya species have been reported to contain high levels of oxalic acid, but it is considered that none of the species, including P. balonensis, occur at such abundance as to cause problems for stock. P. balonensis has been classified as a preferred food source of feral camels in Central Australia.

== Cultivation ==
A selection of this species, cv 'Mystique', has been registered and propagated as a clone. Like other Rumicastrum species, it is self-incompatible, and therefore does not set seed unless grown with other clones. It can be propagated by cuttings and the resulting plants flower prolifically, but they may be difficult to maintain for more than one year. Wild-type plants also make attractive garden plants, and if several clones are grown together, they interpollinate and set abundant seed. The seed germinates only sparsely without some form of scarification of the seed coat, but ~80% germination has been reported when the coat of the tiny seed is nicked with a scalpel, using a dissecting microscope.
