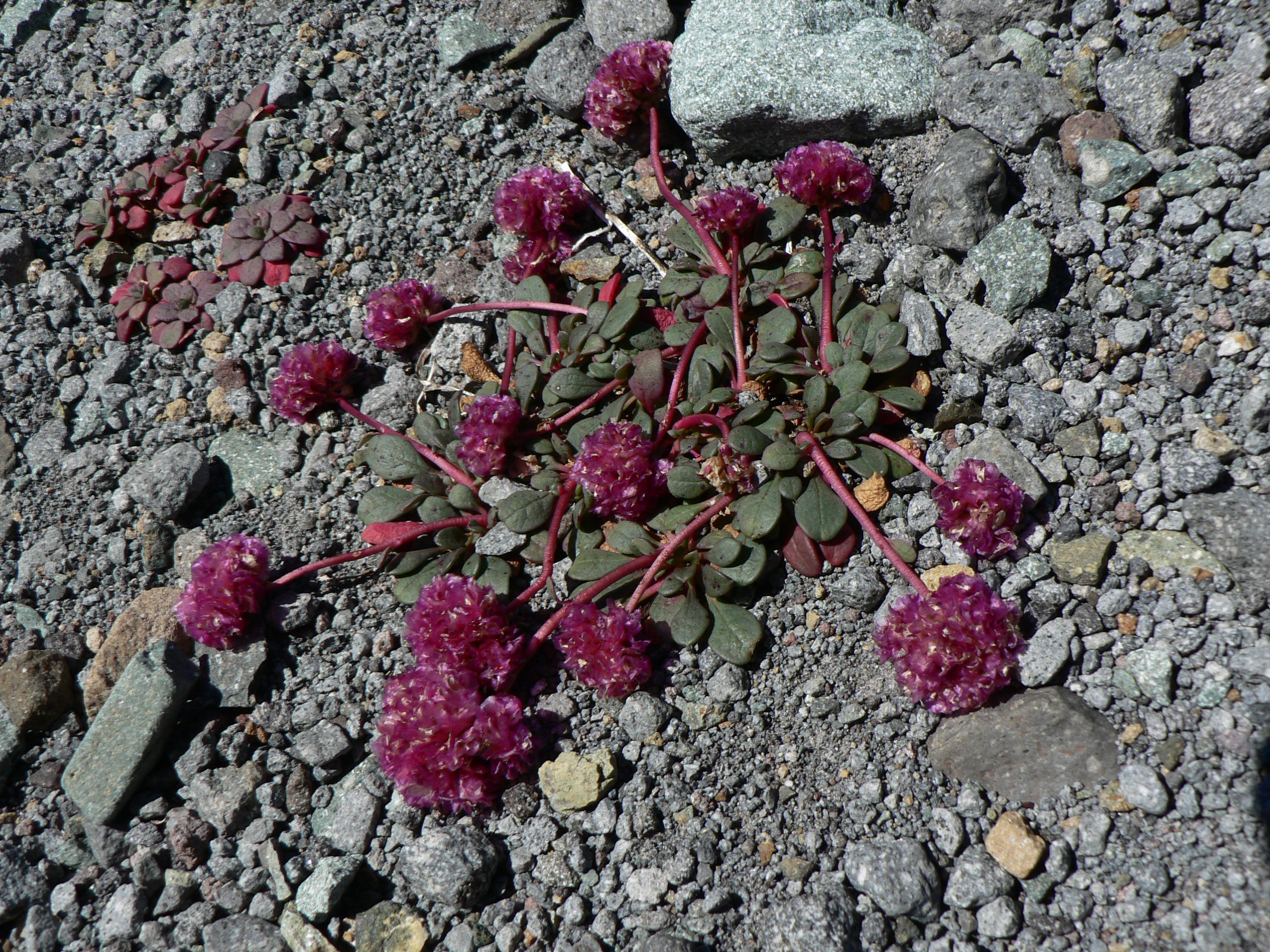

Conservation status
- Apparently Secure (NatureServe)

Scientific classification
- Kingdom: Plantae
- Clade: Tracheophytes
- Clade: Angiosperms
- Clade: Eudicots
- Order: Caryophyllales
- Family: Montiaceae
- Genus: Calyptridium
- Species: C. umbellatum

Binomial name
- Calyptridium umbellatum (Torr.) Greene

Synonyms
- List: Calyptridium nudum; Calyptridium paniculatum; Calyptridium umbellatum var. caudiciferum; Cistanthe umbellata; Cistanthe umbellata var. caudicifera; Spraguea candicifera; Spraguea montana; Spraguea multiceps; Spraguea nuda; Spraguea paniculata; Spraguea umbellata; Spraguea umbellata var. caudicifera; Spraguea umbellata var. montana

= Calyptridium umbellatum =

Mount Hood pussypaws

Plant species in the springbeauty family

Calyptridium umbellatum, synonym Cistanthe umbellata, is a species of flowering plant in the montia family known by the common name Mount Hood pussypaws or — especially outside the Pacific Northwest — simply pussy-paws.

== Range ==
Calyptridium umbellatum is native to western North America from British Columbia to California to Colorado, where it grows in a number of habitat types, including areas inhospitable to many other plant types, such as those with alpine climates.

A small subgroup of C. umbellatum are located in the Zayante Sandhills, a biological island in the Santa Cruz Mountains. These individuals reside on a singular hill in the entirety of the sandhills, and their frail petals and loose seeds allow for easy wind dispersal.

== Habit ==
Calyptridium umbellatum is a perennial herb forming generally two or more basal rosettes of thick, spoon-shaped leaves each a few centimeters long. The inflorescence arises from the rosette, a dense, spherical umbel of rounded sepals and four small petals.

It usually has only one inflorescence per basal rosette; the related C. monospermum generally has more than one.
