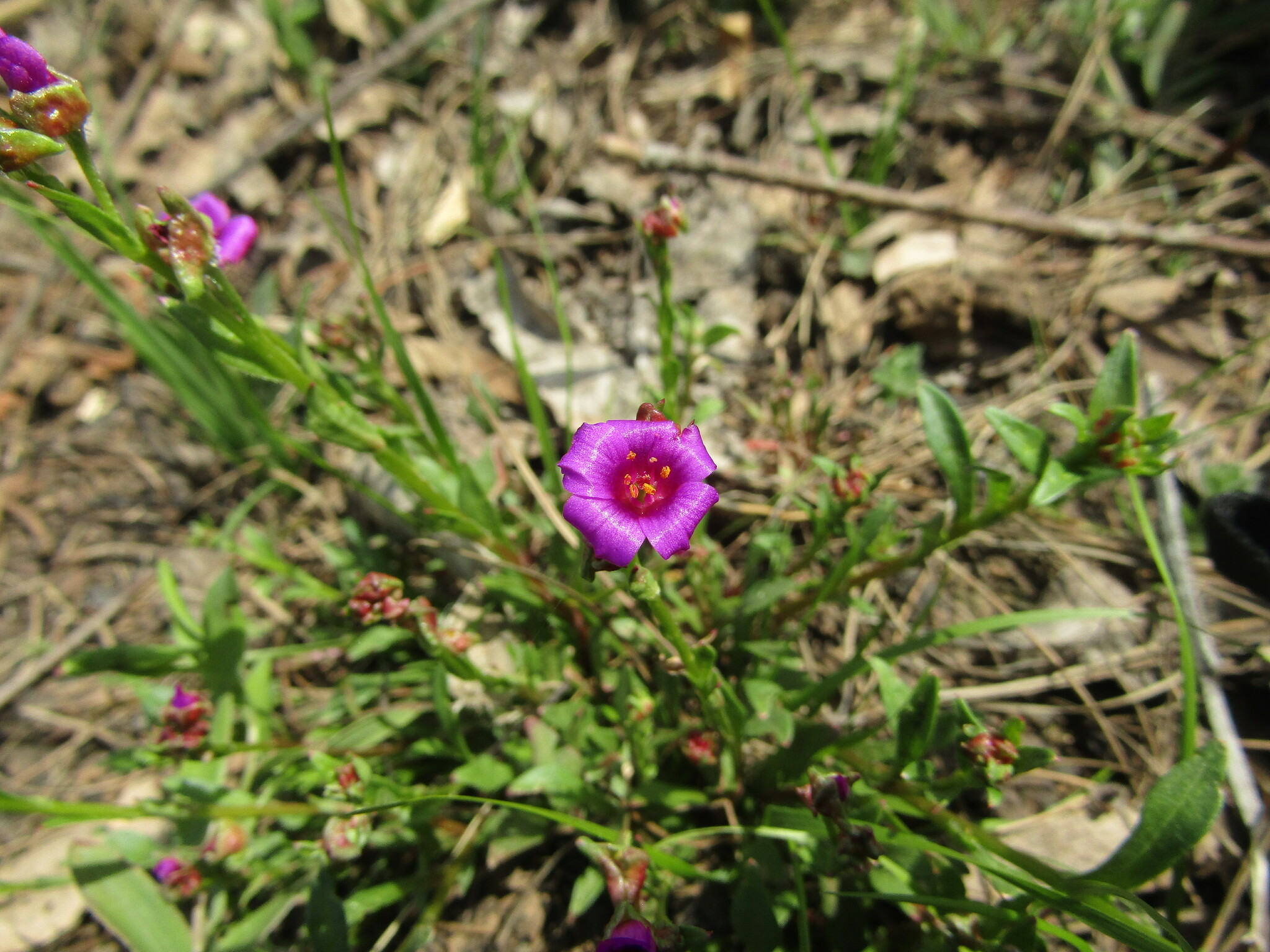

Scientific classification
- Kingdom: Plantae
- Clade: Embryophytes
- Clade: Tracheophytes
- Clade: Angiosperms
- Clade: Eudicots
- Order: Caryophyllales
- Family: Montiaceae
- Genus: Calandrinia
- Species: C. pilosiuscula

Binomial name
- Calandrinia pilosiuscula DC.

Synonyms
- List: Claytonia pilosiuscula (DC.) Kuntze; Talinum pilosiusculum (DC.) Colla; Calandrinia adscendens F.Phil.; Calandrinia angulata Fisch., C.A.Mey. & Avé-Lall.; Calandrinia compressa Schrad. ex DC.; Calandrinia compressa var. adscendens DC.; Calandrinia compressa var. macilenta (Barnéoud) Acevedo; Calandrinia curvifolia Schltdl.; Calandrinia gaudichaudii Barnéoud; Calandrinia glandulosa Steud.; Calandrinia lingulata Steud.; Calandrinia macilenta Barnéoud; Calandrinia parviflora Steud.; Calandrinia pilosiuscula var. tenella (Hook.) Hook. & Arn.; Calandrinia procumbens Moris; Calandrinia tenella Hook.; Calandrinia virgata Phil.; Claytonia compressa (Schrad. ex DC.) Kuntze; Claytonia gaudichaudii Kuntze; Claytonia linaria (Bertero ex Colla) Kuntze; Claytonia macilenta (Barnéoud) Kuntze; Claytonia procumbens (Moris) Kuntze; Claytonia tenuis (Bertero ex Colla) Kuntze; Claytonia virgata (Phil.) Kuntze; Talinum acaule Spreng.; Talinum adscendens DC.; Talinum ciliatum Hook.; Talinum gracile Bertero ex Colla; Talinum linaria Bertero ex Colla; Talinum lineare Hoffmanns.

= Calandrinia pilosiuscula =

Species of plant

Calandrinia pilosiuscula is a species of flowering plant endemic to Chile and introduced to New Zealand.

== Description ==
Leaves are linear-spatulate and covered with fine hairs. Its flowers are pink, each with an axillary pedicel, that form a cluster where they meet at the top of the stem. There are ten to fifteen stamens.
