= Calyptridium parryi =

Conservation status
- Vulnerable (NatureServe)

Scientific classification
- Kingdom: Plantae
- Clade: Tracheophytes
- Clade: Angiosperms
- Clade: Eudicots
- Order: Caryophyllales
- Family: Montiaceae
- Genus: Calyptridium
- Species: C. parryi

Binomial name
- Calyptridium parryi A.Gray

Synonyms
- Cistanthe parryi (A.Gray) Hershk.

Species of flowering plant

Calyptridium parryi, synonym Cistanthe parryi, is a species of flowering plant in the family Montiaceae. It is known by the common name Parry's pussypaws. It is native to the southwestern United States and Baja California. It is a small annual herb producing spreading stems up to about 11 centimeters long. There is a basal rosette of small, thick, spoon-shaped leaves no more than about 3 centimeters long, with many along the stems as well. The inflorescence is a cluster a few centimeters wide, with each bearing three white petals surrounded by a few thin sepals. The fruit is a capsule less than a centimeter wide.
