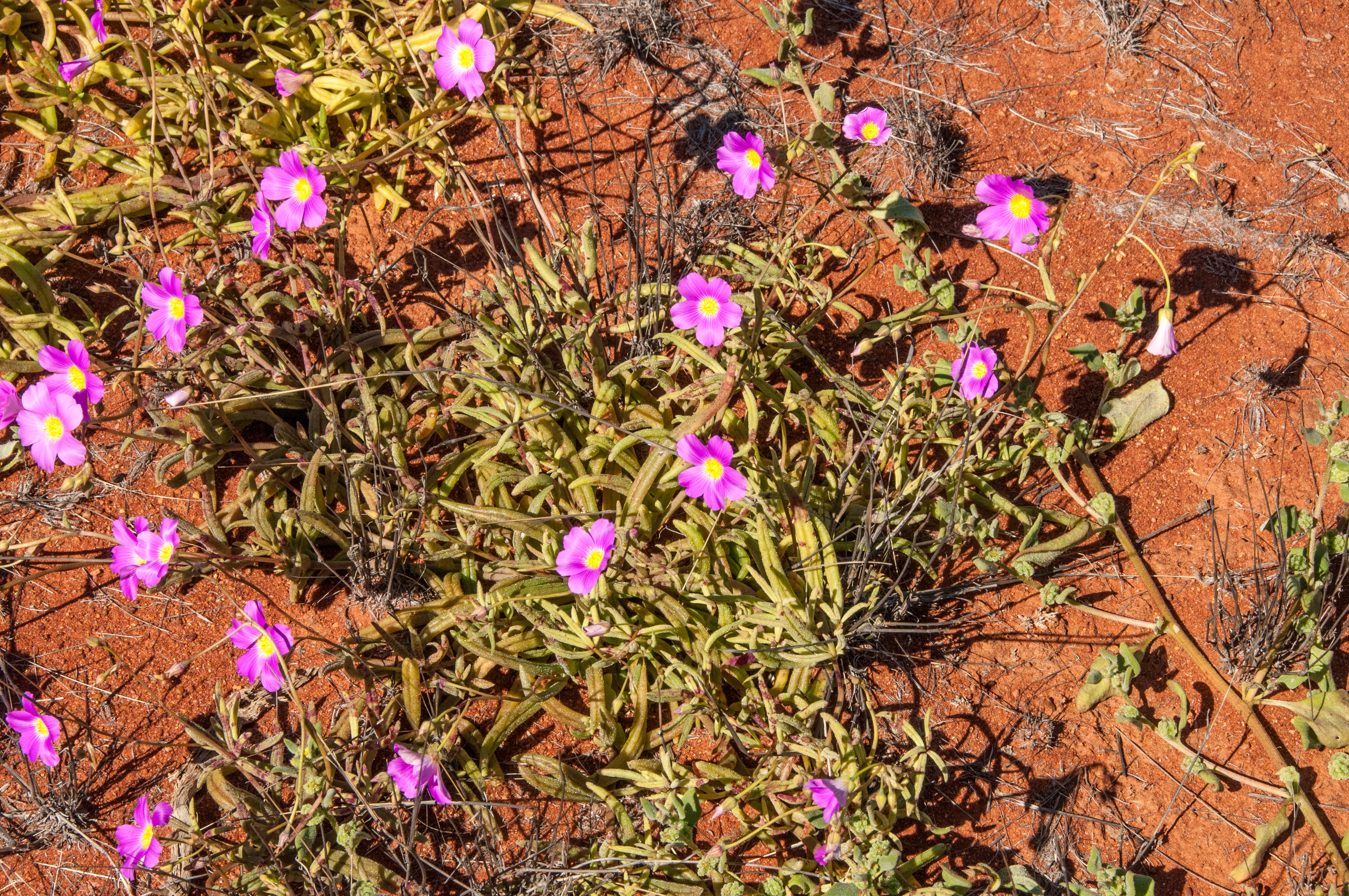
- Rumicastrum calyptratum, pink purslane, Upper Gascoyne, Western Australia

Scientific classification
- Kingdom: Plantae
- Clade: Tracheophytes
- Clade: Angiosperms
- Clade: Eudicots
- Order: Caryophyllales
- Family: Montiaceae
- Genus: Rumicastrum
- Species: R. calyptratum

Binomial name
- Rumicastrum calyptratum (Hook.f.) Carolin (2020)

Synonyms
- Calandrinia calyptrata Hook.f. (1840); Claytonia calyptrata (Hook.f.) F.Muell. (1862); Parakeelya calyptrata (Hook.f.) Hershk. (1998 publ. 1999)

= Rumicastrum calyptratum =

Pink purslane

Species of plant

Rumicastrum calyptratum (synonym Calandrinia calyptrata), the pink purslane or small-leaved parakeelya, is an annual plant in the family Montiaceae. It is endemic to Australia.

The species occurs in Western Australia, South Australia, Victoria, Queensland, Tasmania, and New South Wales.
