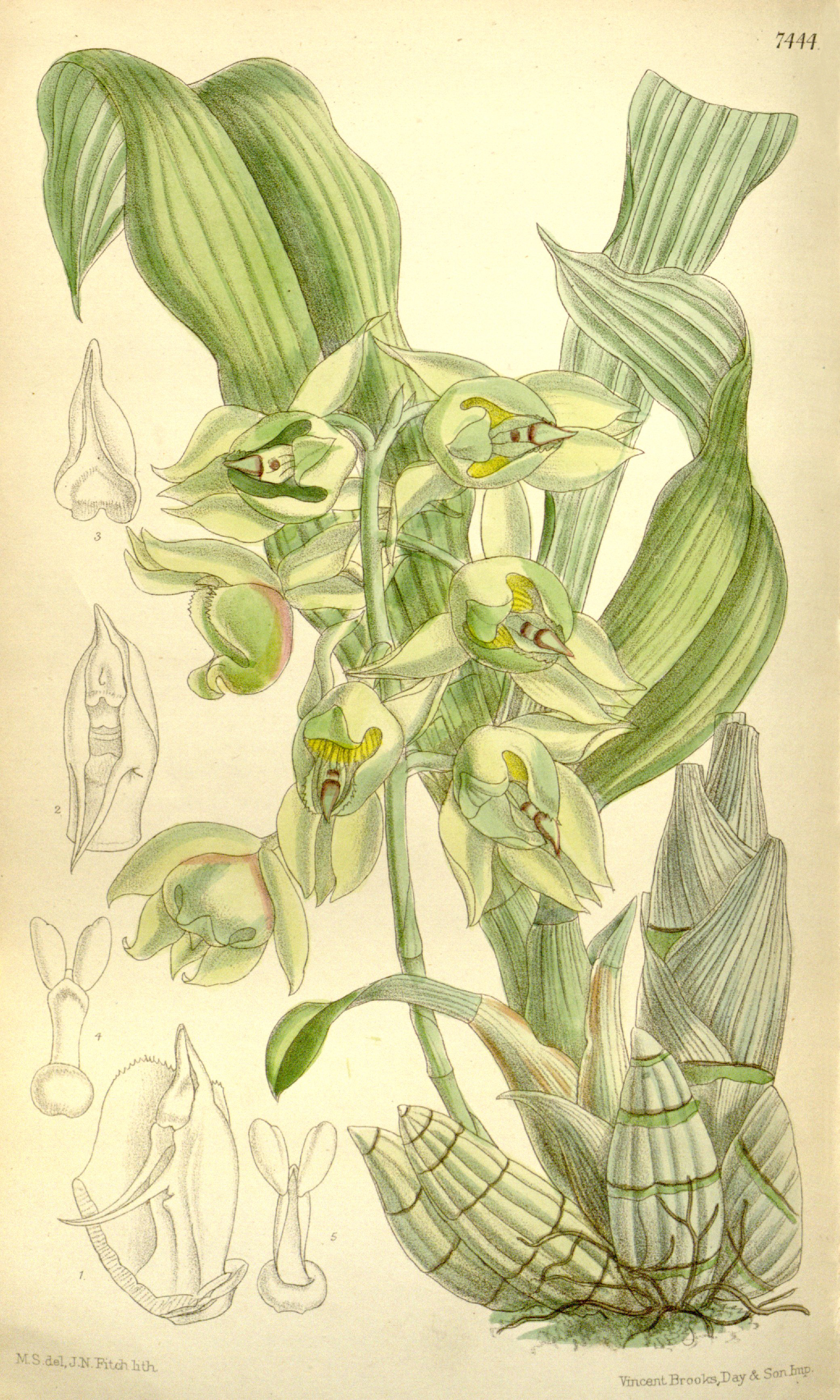

Scientific classification
- Kingdom: Plantae
- Clade: Tracheophytes
- Clade: Angiosperms
- Clade: Monocots
- Order: Asparagales
- Family: Orchidaceae
- Subfamily: Epidendroideae
- Genus: Catasetum
- Species: C. lemosii

Binomial name
- Catasetum lemosii Rolfe (1894)

Synonyms
- Catasetum roseum Barb.Rodr. (1877)

= Catasetum lemosii =

Species of orchid

Catasetum lemosii is a species of orchid found in northern Brazil, first formally described by Robert Allen Rolfe in 1894.
