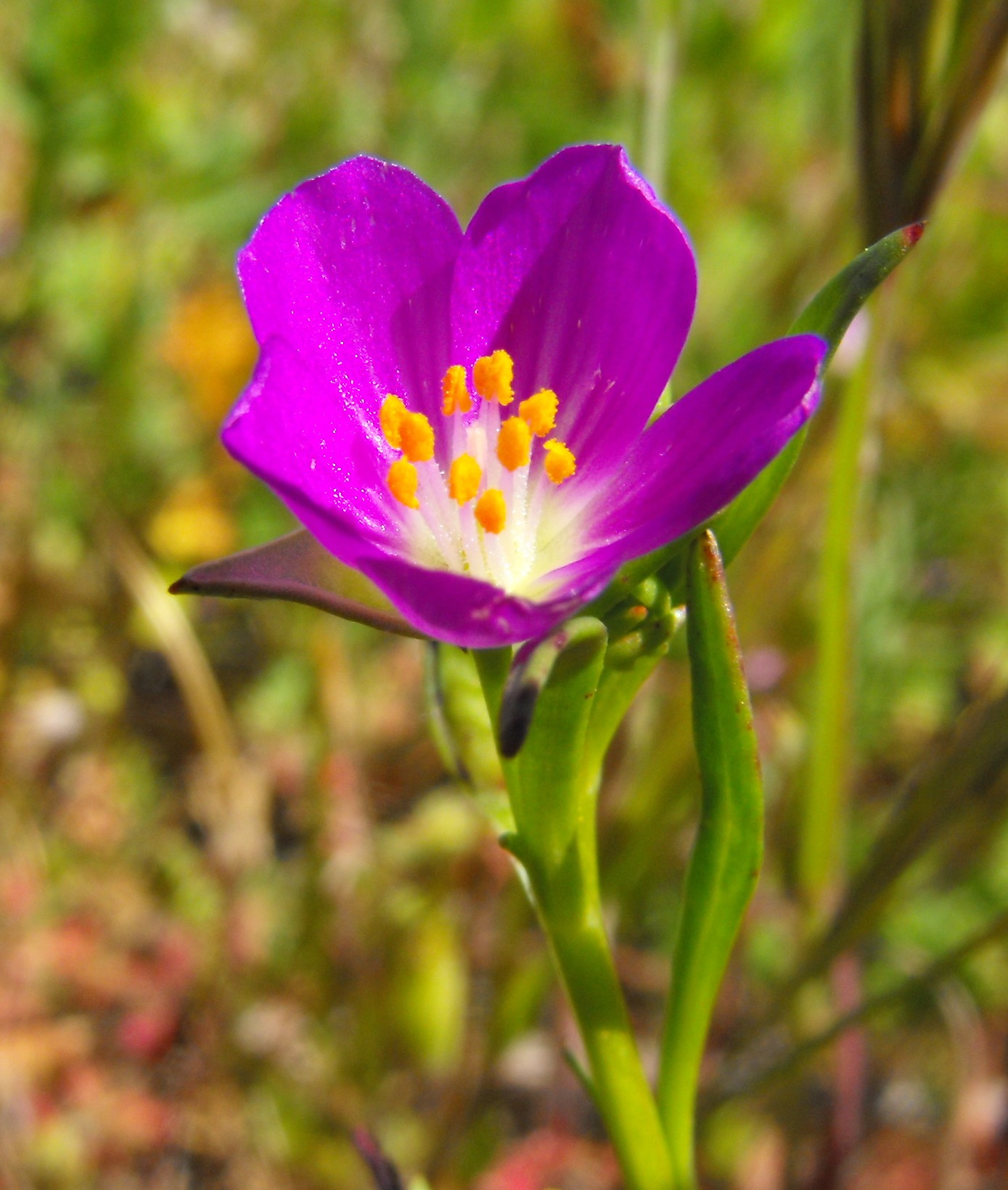

Conservation status
- Apparently Secure (NatureServe)

Scientific classification
- Kingdom: Plantae
- Clade: Tracheophytes
- Clade: Angiosperms
- Clade: Eudicots
- Order: Caryophyllales
- Family: Montiaceae
- Genus: Calandrinia
- Species: C. ciliata

Binomial name
- Calandrinia ciliata (Ruiz & Pav.) DC.

Synonyms
- Synonymy: Calandrinia arizonica Rydb. (1932); Calandrinia axilliflora var. foliosa Phil. (1894); Calandrinia axilliflora var. minor Barnéoud (1847); Calandrinia bonariensis Hauman (1925); Calandrinia caulescens Kunth (1823); Calandrinia caulescens Phil. (1894), nom. illeg.; Calandrinia caulescens subsp. menziesii (Hook.) Piper & Beattie (1915); Calandrinia caulescens var. menziesii (Hook.) A.Gray (1887); Calandrinia ciliata var. menziesii (Hook.) J.F.Macbr. (1931); Calandrinia elegans Spach (1836); Calandrinia feltonii Skottsb. (1913); Calandrinia menziesii (Hook.) Torr. & A.Gray (1838); Calandrinia menziesii var. alba Orcutt (1891); Calandrinia micrantha Schltdl. (1839); Calandrinia muricata Rydb. (1932); Calandrinia phacosperma DC. (1828), nom. superfl.; Calandrinia pulchella Lilja (1843); Calandrinia speciosa Lindl. (1833), nom. illeg.; Calandrinia stenophylla Rydb. (1931); Calandrinia tenella Rydb. (1931), nom. illeg.; Calyptridium depressum A.Nelson (1945); Claytonia alba var. caulescens (Kunth) Kuntze (1898); Claytonia caulescens (Kunth) Kuntze (1891); Claytonia ciliata (Ruiz & Pav.) Kuntze (1891); Claytonia menziesii (Hook.) Kuntze (1891); Claytonia peruviana (Haw.) Kuntze (1891); Claytonia triandria Sessé & Moc. (1894); Cosmia caulescens (Kunth) Dombey ex Britten (1900); Cosmia montana Dombey ex DC. (1828), not validly publ.; Phacosperma peruviana Haw. (1827); Talinum caulescens (Kunth) Spreng. (1825); Talinum ciliatum Ruiz & Pav. (1794); Talinum cosmia F.Dietr. (1838), nom. superfl.; Talinum menziesii Hook. (1832); Tetragonia peruviana Haw. (1827), not validly publ.

= Calandrinia ciliata =

Species of flowering plant

Calandrinia ciliata is a species of flowering plant known as fringed redmaids and red-maids. While formerly included in the Purslane family, it is now treated as a member of the family Montiaceae.

It is native to western North America from British Columbia to New Mexico and Guatemala, where it is widespread and common. It can also be found in western and southern South America, from Venezuela and Colombia through the Andean countries to southern Argentina and Chile.

== Description ==
Calandrinia ciliata is an annual herb which varies greatly in size from a small patch a few centimeters wide to an erect form approaching 40 cm (16 in) tall. The linear or lance-shaped leaves are 1 to 10 cm (0.39 to 3.94 in) long and slightly succulent in texture.

The inflorescence is a raceme bearing flowers on short pedicels. The flower has usually five deep pink to red petals, each up to 1.4 cm (0.55 in) in length. There are two sepals at the base beneath the petals.

This is a hardy plant well adapted to many habitats and climate types. Where it is an introduced species, it is known as a minor weed.
