= Calyptridium pygmaeum =

Pygmy pussypaws

Conservation status
- Critically Imperiled (NatureServe)

Scientific classification
- Kingdom: Plantae
- Clade: Tracheophytes
- Clade: Angiosperms
- Clade: Eudicots
- Order: Caryophyllales
- Family: Montiaceae
- Genus: Calyptridium
- Species: C. pygmaeum

Binomial name
- Calyptridium pygmaeum Parish ex Rydb.

Synonyms
- Cistanthe pygmaea (Parish ex Rydb.) Hershk.

Species of flowering plant

Calyptridium pygmaeum, common name pygmy pussypaws, is a plant species endemic to California. It has been reported from Riverside, San Bernardino, Inyo, Tulare and Fresno Counties, in pine and subalpine forests at elevations of 1900–3550 m.

Calyptridium pygmaeum is an annual herb. Stems are horizontal, spreading out in various directions from the rootstock, each up to 8 cm (3.1 in) long. Leaves are up to 15 mm (0.59 in) long. Flowers form dense clusters at the ends of each of the branches. Sepals are egg-shaped and fleshy. The 4 petals are white, each up to 3 mm (0.12 in) long, remaining attached to the fruit. Capsule is egg-shaped, about 5 mm (0.20 in) across. Seeds are black, round and shiny.
