= Calyptridium pulchellum =

Conservation status
- Critically Imperiled (NatureServe)

- Threatened (ESA)

Scientific classification
- Kingdom: Plantae
- Clade: Tracheophytes
- Clade: Angiosperms
- Clade: Eudicots
- Order: Caryophyllales
- Family: Montiaceae
- Genus: Calyptridium
- Species: C. pulchellum

Binomial name
- Calyptridium pulchellum (Eastw.) Hoover

Synonyms
- Cistanthe pulchella (Eastw.) Hershk.; Spraguea pulchella Eastw.

Species of flowering plant

Calyptridium pulchellum, synonym Cistanthe pulchella, is a rare species of flowering plant in the family Montiaceae. It is known by the common name Mariposa pussypaws. It is endemic to the Sierra Nevada foothills of central California, where it is known from only a few scattered occurrences. It grows on barren patches of granite gravel in woodland and grasslands. It is a federally listed threatened species.

== Description ==
It is a small red-green annual plant radiating spreading stems commonly 2 to 7 centimetres (0.79 to 2.76 in), up to 10 to 20 centimetres (3.9 to 7.9 in) long. There is a basal rosette of tiny, thick leaves. The inflorescence is a number of more or less spherical clusters of rose-colored petals and thin sepals. The fruit is a tiny translucent capsule containing one or two seeds.

== Conservation ==
In 2007, there were about 9 or 10 occurrences of the plant, with some occurrences made up of two or more small populations. The total population number varies year to year, generally because of the influence of local weather changes on the germination of seeds and the growth of seedlings. Past total population estimates varied from 1680 to nearly 3000 individuals. Some populations are located on private land and have not been surveyed in many years. Others are quite variable in size, increasing from 58 to 770 individuals, or decreasing from hundreds of plants to only 3.

A major threat to this species is habitat fragmentation; populations have been bisected by roads, dirtbike trails, and firebreaks. At least two populations are in the middle of residential subdivisions, or on the edges; these may be extirpated by now. Residential and commercial development continue to claim the habitat, as does the expansion of infrastructure to support the new development, including local services, utilities, and roads. Livestock are allowed to graze in some areas, but it is unknown if this affects the species. Since most of the populations are small, they are vulnerable to destruction from any one severe local event, such as drought or disease, and since the populations sometimes fall to very low numbers they are at risk for genetic bottlenecks and genetic drift.
