= Calyptridium quadripetalum =

Conservation status
- Apparently Secure (NatureServe)

Scientific classification
- Kingdom: Plantae
- Clade: Tracheophytes
- Clade: Angiosperms
- Clade: Eudicots
- Order: Caryophyllales
- Family: Montiaceae
- Genus: Calyptridium
- Species: C. quadripetalum

Binomial name
- Calyptridium quadripetalum S.Watson

Synonyms
- Cistanthe quadripetala (S.Watson) Hershk.

Species of flowering plant

Calyptridium quadripetalum, synonym Cistanthe quadripetala, is a species of flowering plant in the family Montiaceae. It is also commonly known as the four-petalled pussypaw. It is endemic to the North Coast Ranges of California, where it is an uncommon member of the serpentine soils flora on the slopes. It is a small annual plant spreading or erect stems each a few centimeters long. There is a basal rosette of small, thick leaves and a few along the stems. The inflorescence is a dense cluster of sepals and four white to pink round petals.
