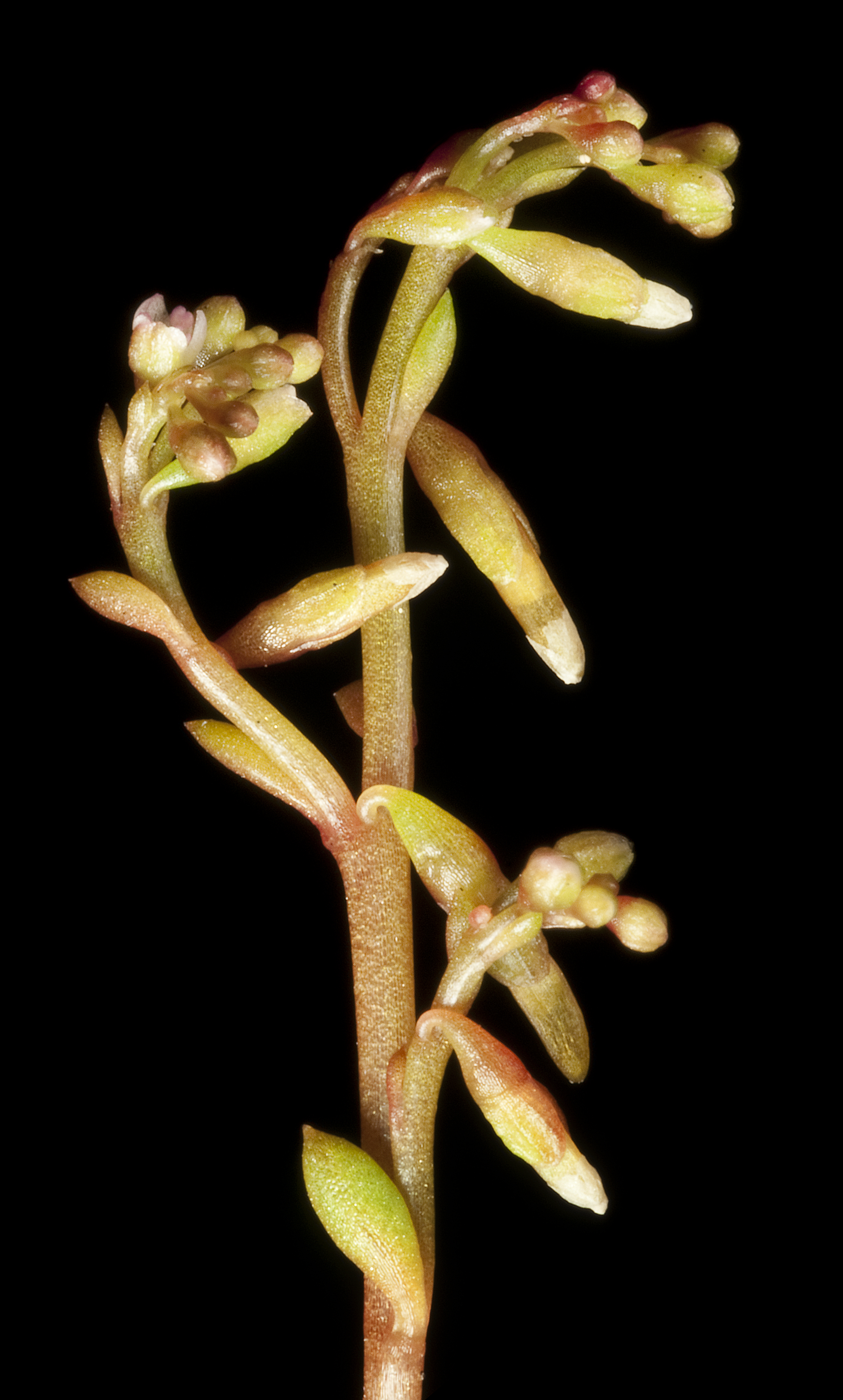

Scientific classification
- Kingdom: Plantae
- Clade: Tracheophytes
- Clade: Angiosperms
- Clade: Eudicots
- Order: Caryophyllales
- Family: Montiaceae
- Genus: Rumicastrum
- Species: R. corrigioloides

Binomial name
- Rumicastrum corrigioloides (F.Muell. ex Benth.) Carolin (2020)

Synonyms
- Calandrinia corrigioloides F.Muell. ex Benth. (1863); Claytonia corrigioloides (F.Muell. ex Benth.) F.Muell.; Parakeelya corrigioloides (F.Muell. ex Benth.) Hershk. (1998 publ. 1999)

= Rumicastrum corrigioloides =

Annual herb

Rumicastrum corrigioloides (synonym Calandrinia corrigioloides) is an annual herb in the family Montiaceae, and is native to Western Australia, South Australia, and Victoria.

== Description ==
It is a succulent, prostrate herb, with pink-white flowers. It flowers from August to November and grows on sandy soils in swampy depressions, flats, and sand dunes. The stems of the flowers (pedicels) are 0.5–2 mm long and spreading to reflexed in fruit. The bracts are leafy and alternate, the sepals are persistent and the 4 or 5 petals are white to pale-pink. There are 3 to 4 stamens and 3 stigmas 3 which are free to the base. The capsule is three valved and narrow-ovoid to elongate-cylindrical, and the seeds are black, shiny, and smooth and 0.7–1 mm in diameter.

== Taxonomy ==
The species was first described as Calandrinia corrigioloides by Ferdinand von Mueller in 1863. The genus Calandrinia was discovered to be paraphyletic, and the Australasian species were moved to genus Rumicastrum in 2020.
