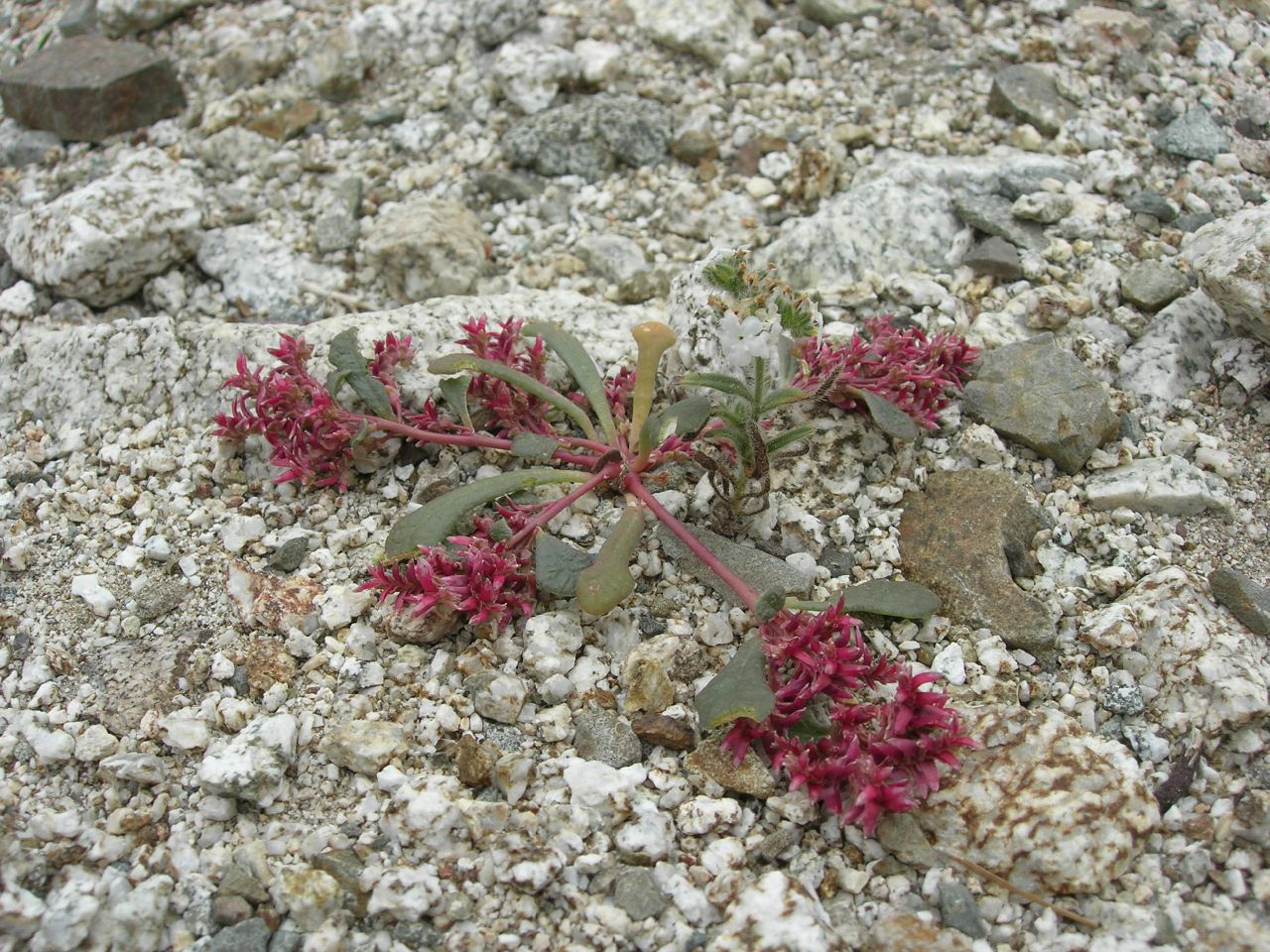
- Calyptridium monandrum

Scientific classification
- Kingdom: Plantae
- Clade: Tracheophytes
- Clade: Angiosperms
- Clade: Eudicots
- Order: Caryophyllales
- Family: Montiaceae
- Genus: Calyptridium; Nutt. (1838)

Synonyms
- Spraguea Torr. (1851)

= Calyptridium =

Genus of flowering plants

Calyptridium is a genus of flowering plants belonging to the family Montiaceae.

Its native range is Northern America, Southern South America.

Species:

- Calyptridium hesseae (J.H.Thomas) Hershk., syn. Calyptridium parryi var. hesseae J.H.Thomas
- Calyptridium martirense (Guilliams, M.G.Simpson & Rebman) Hershk.
- Calyptridium monandrum Nutt.
- Calyptridium monospermum Greene
- Calyptridium nevadense (J.T.Howell) Hershk.
- Calyptridium parryi A.Gray, including Calyptridium arizonicum (J.T.Howell) M.G.Simpson, M.Silveira & Guilliams, syn. Calyptridium parryi var. arizonicum
- Calyptridium pulchellum (Eastw.) Hoover
- Calyptridium pygmaeum Parish ex Rydb.
- Calyptridium quadripetalum S.Watson
- Calyptridium roseum S.Watson
- Calyptridium umbellatum (Torr.) Greene
