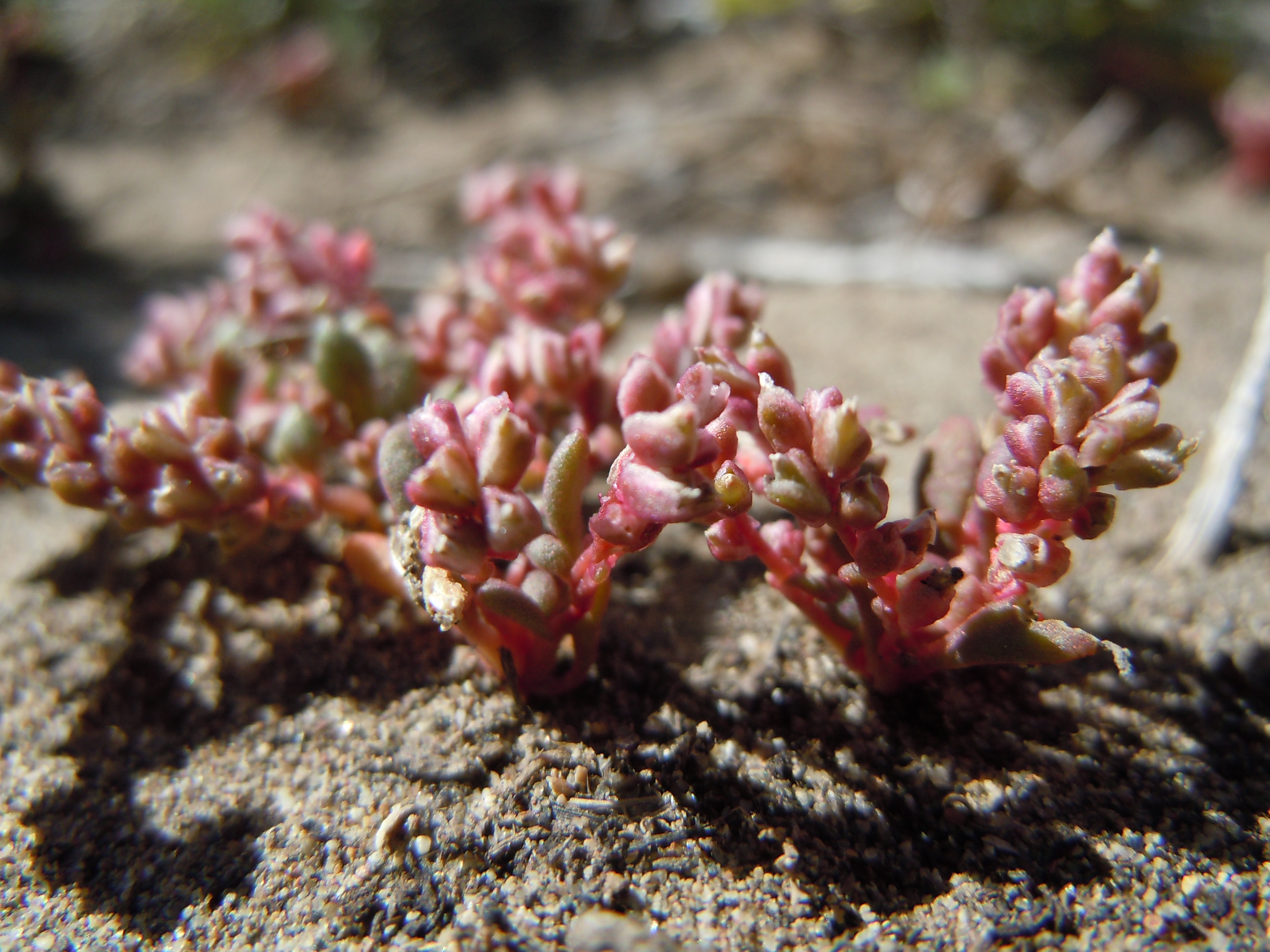

Scientific classification
- Kingdom: Plantae
- Clade: Tracheophytes
- Clade: Angiosperms
- Clade: Eudicots
- Order: Caryophyllales
- Family: Montiaceae
- Genus: Calyptridium
- Species: C. roseum

Binomial name
- Calyptridium roseum S.Watson

Synonyms
- Cistanthe rosea (S.Watson) Hershk.

= Calyptridium roseum =

Species of flowering plant

Calyptridium roseum, synonym Cistanthe rosea, is a species of flowering plant in the family Montiaceae commonly known as rosy pussypaws. It is native to the western United States from California to Wyoming, where it grows in forest and scrub. It is an annual herb, often reddish or pink in color, producing stems just a few centimeters long. The leaves are located in a rosette at the base and along the stems, and are up to 4 or 5 centimeters long. The inflorescence is a tiny cluster of white-edged thin sepals and two white petals, each no more than a millimeter long.
