= Mark Alan Hershkovitz =

American biochemist and taxonomist

Mark Alan Hershkovitz was an American plant taxonomist. The standard author abbreviation Hershk. is used to indicate this person as the author when citing a botanical name.

In 1981 he received his Bachelor of Science from University of Illinois, Urbana-Champaign. He received his Master of Science and PhD degrees from University of California, Davis, in 1986 and 1990; his focus in his doctoral program was botany. Afterwards, he worked for the Laboratory of Molecular Systematics at the Smithsonian Institution as a postdoctoral scientist, and c. 1996 he joined the National Center for Biotechnology Information as a fellow under the Postdoctoral Intramural Research Training Award. From 2000-2006 he was an assistant professor at the University of Chile.

Mark died on June 9, 2026 at the age of 67.

== Taxa (re)named by Hershkovitz ==
- Cistanthe amaranthoides (Phil.) Carolin ex Hershk.
- C. arenaria (Cham.) Carolin ex Hershk.
- C. calycina Carolin ex Hershk.
- C.celosioides (Phil.) Carolin ex Hershk.
- C.cephalophora (I.M.Johnston) Carolin ex Hershk.
- C.coquimbensis (Barneoud) Carolin ex Hershk.
- C.cymosa (Phil.) Hershk.
- C. densiflora (Barnéoud) Hershk.
- C. monandra (Nutt.) Hershk.
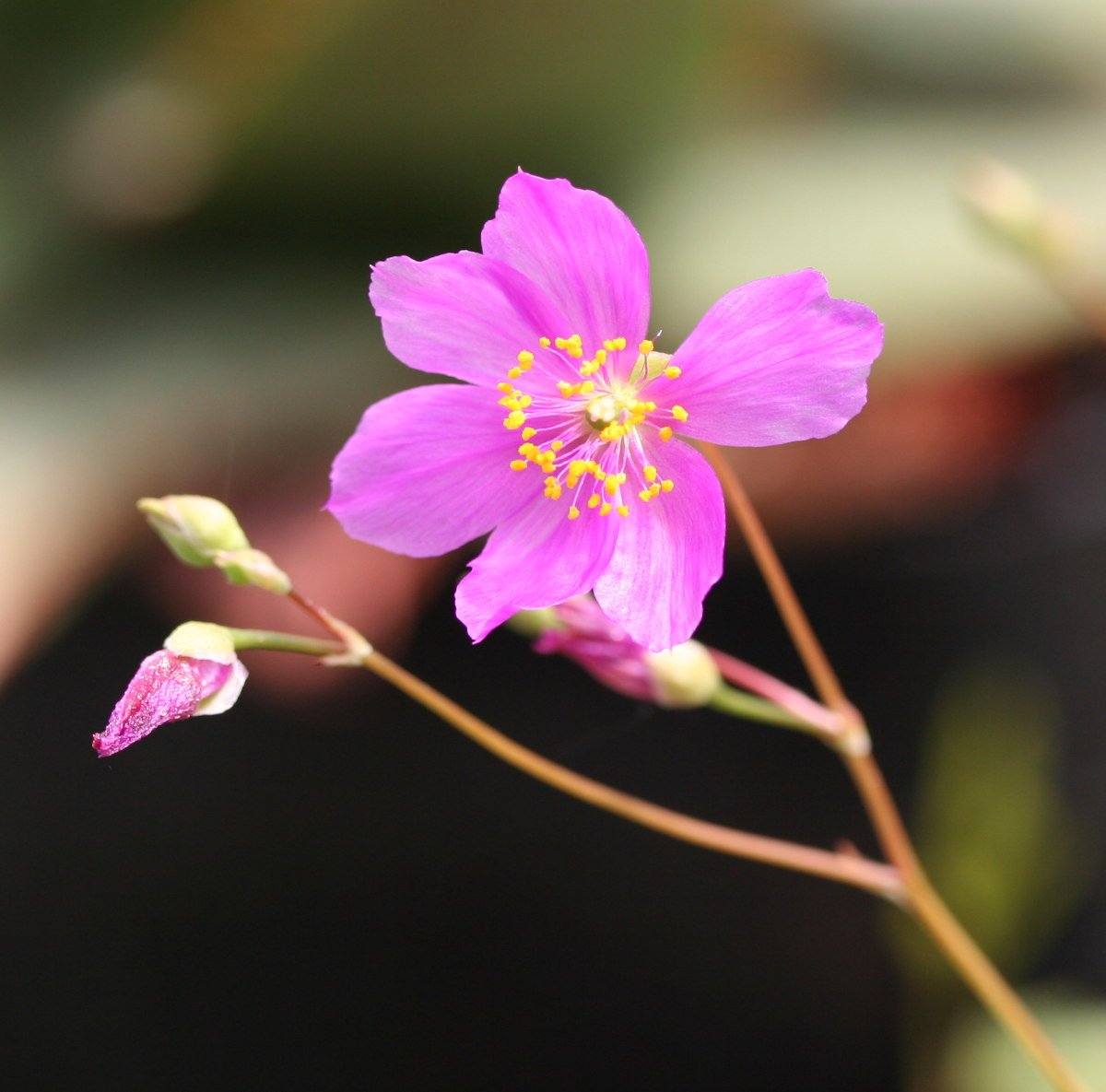
Phemeranthus spinescens

== Works ==
- Hershkovitz, M.A. & Zimmer, E.A. 2000. Ribosomal DNA evidence and disjunctions of western American Portulacaceae Mol. Phylogenetics and Evolution 15(3): 419–439.
- Hershkovitz M.A., Arroyo M.T.K, Bell C., and Hinojosa L.F 2006

Phylogeny of Chaetanthera (Asteraceae: Mutisieae) reveals both ancient and recent origins of the high elevation lineages Molecular Phylogenetics and Evolution 41: 594-605.

- Hershkovitz, M. A. (April–June 1992). "Leaf Morphology and Taxonomic Analysis of Cistanthe tweedyi (Nee Lewisia tweedyi; Portulacaceae)". Systematic Botany. 17 (2): 220–238. Bibcode:1992SysBo..17..220H. doi:10.2307/2419519. JSTOR 2419519.
- Hershkovitz, M. A. (November 1989). "Phylogenetic Studies in Centrospermae: A Brief Appraisal". Taxon. 38 (4). Wiley: 602–608. Bibcode:1989Taxon..38..602H. doi:10.2307/1222636. JSTOR 1222636.
