= Banner (disambiguation) =

A banner is a symbol-bearing flag.

Banner may also refer to:

== Places ==
=== United States ===
- Banner, California, San Diego County, an unincorporated community
- Banner, Illinois, a village
- Banner, Kentucky, an unincorporated community
- Banner, Missouri, an unincorporated community
- Banner, Mississippi, an unincorporated community
- Banner, Ohio, an unincorporated community
- Banner, Virginia, an unincorporated community
- Banner, Wisconsin, an unincorporated community
- Banner, Wyoming, an unincorporated community
- Banner County, Nebraska
- Banner Township (disambiguation)
- Banner Mountain, California
- Banner Peak, California

=== Elsewhere ===
- Banner (administrative division), found in Asia
- Banner (Inner Mongolia), administrative division
- Banner, a community in the township of Zorra, Ontario, Canada

== Surname ==
- Banner (surname), a list of people and fictional characters

== In publishing ==
- Banner (newspaper), a list of newspapers
- The Banner (magazine), published by the Christian Reformed Church of North America
- The Baltimore Banner, an American news website based in Baltimore, Maryland

== In arts and entertainment ==
- Banner Theatre, an English-based community theatre company
- Banner Records, a record label
- The Banner (band), an American metalcore band
- Banners (musician), English musician
- Banner (album), by Desperation Band, 2014
- "Banner", a song by Lights from Siberia, 2011

== Other ==
- USS Banner, two ships named after Banner County, Nebraska
- Banner (Australian rules football), supporters' banner
- Banner (playing card), used in Swiss-suited cards
- Banner page, a page inserted between documents by computerized printing in order to separate them
- Web banner, a form of online advertising
- Banner (Unix), a program for generating a large ASCII art version of input text
- Banner School District, El Reno, Oklahoma
- Banner (strawberry), a defunct strawberry variety
- Banner Health, a non-profit health system based in Phoenix, Arizona
- Banner Bank, a commercial bank headquartered in Walla Walla, Washington
- Banner (Mongols), a pole with circularly arranged horse or yak tail hairs of varying colors arranged at the top
- Banner (cavalry), the basic administrative unit of the Polish and Lithuanian cavalry from the 14th century
- Banner or Eublemma anachoresis, a moth of the family Erebidae

== See also ==
- Ban (disambiguation)
- Banna (disambiguation)
