= Banna =

Banna may refer to:

- Banna (Battagram), a town in Khyber Pakhtunkhwa, Pakistan
- Banna (Birdoswald), a Roman Birdoswald in Cumbria in England
- Banna, Bangladesh, a town in Barisal, Bangladesh
- Banna, Ilocos Norte, a municipality in the Philippines
- Banna people, an ethnic group from Ethiopia
- Banna Strand, a beach in Country Kerry, Ireland
- Ban Na district, a district in Nakhon Nayok Province, Thailand
- Om Banna, a shrine located in Pali district near Jodhpur, India
- Xishuangbanna Dai Autonomous Prefecture, commonly shorted to Banna, a prefecture in Yunnan, China

== See also ==
- al-Banna
- Banner (disambiguation)
