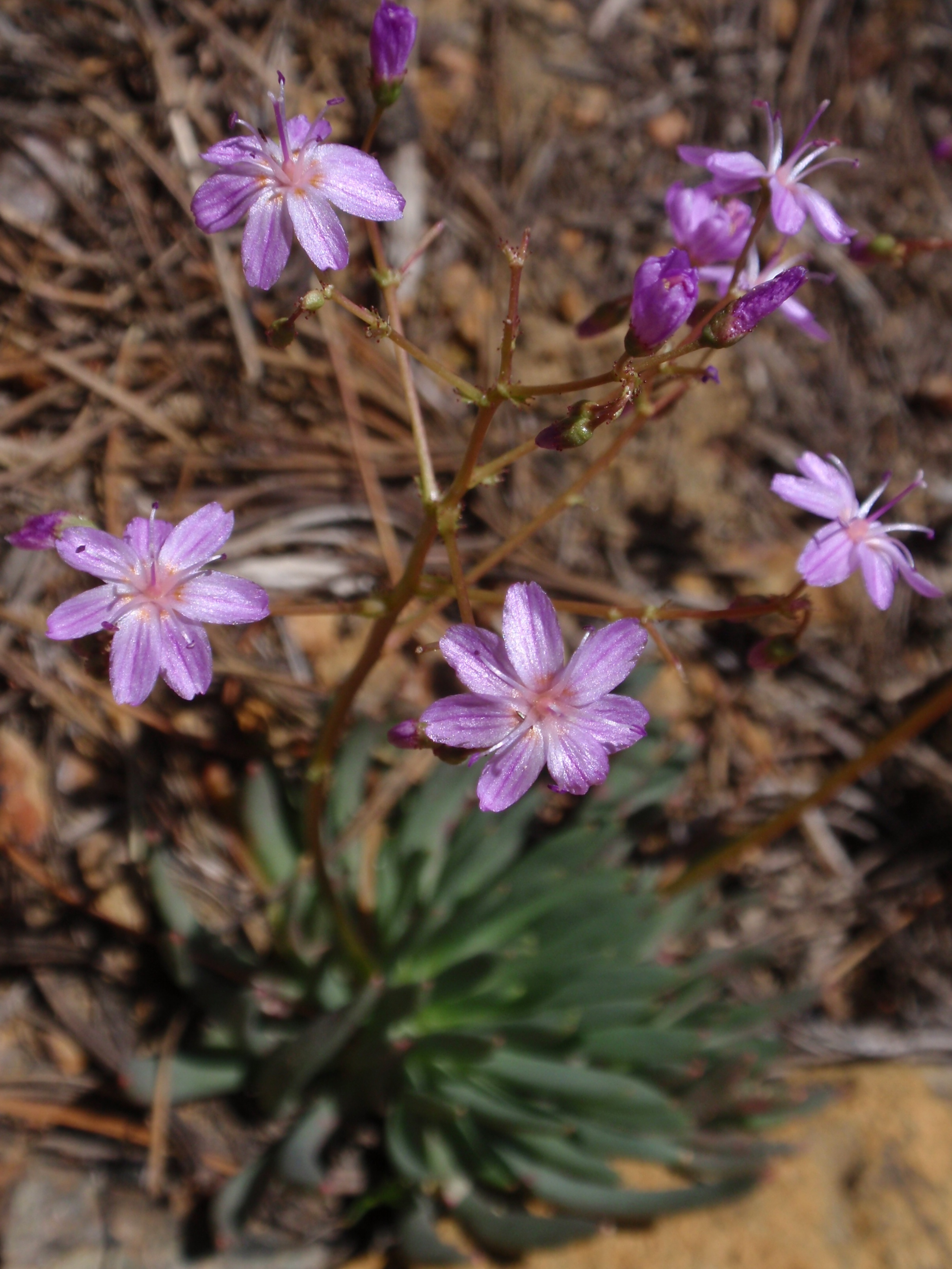

Scientific classification
- Kingdom: Plantae
- Clade: Tracheophytes
- Clade: Angiosperms
- Clade: Eudicots
- Order: Caryophyllales
- Family: Montiaceae
- Genus: Lewisia
- Species: L. leeana

Binomial name
- Lewisia leeana (Porter) B.L.Rob.

= Lewisia leeana =

Species of flowering plant

Lewisia leeana (orth. var. L. leana) is a species of flowering plant in the family Montiaceae known by the common name quill-leaf lewisia. It is native to California and Oregon, where it grows in the mountains of the Sierra Nevada and Klamath Ranges. This is a perennial herb growing from narrow, woody taproot connected to one or more caudices. It produces a basal rosette of many fleshy flat to cylindrical blunt-tipped leaves up to 4 centimeters (1.6 in) long. The inflorescence bears many flowers on erect, branching stems up to about 24 centimeters (9.4 in) tall. Each flower has 5 to 8 white, pink, or purplish petals each about half a centimeter long.

This plant is named for Lambert Wilmer Lee, who collected it in the Siskiyou Mountains just south of the Oregon border in 1876. It commonly hybridizes with Lewisia cotyledon in the wild, producing Lewisia x whiteae.
