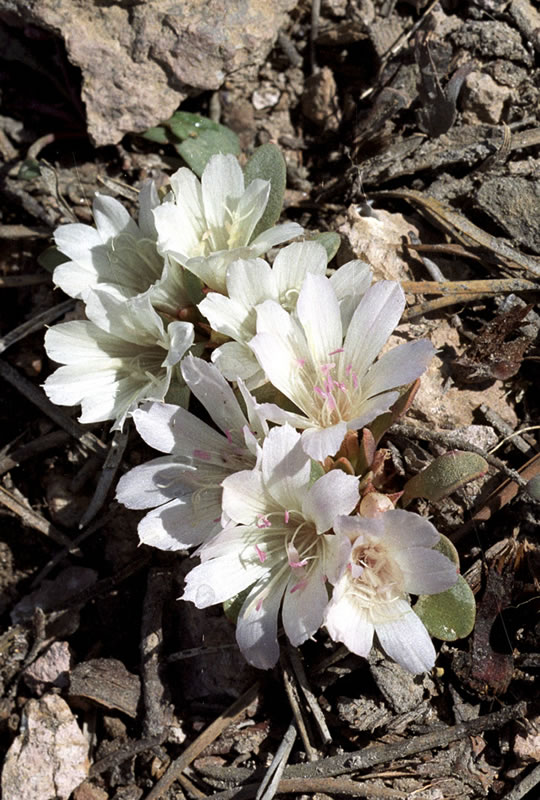

Scientific classification
- Kingdom: Plantae
- Clade: Tracheophytes
- Clade: Angiosperms
- Clade: Eudicots
- Order: Caryophyllales
- Family: Montiaceae
- Genus: Lewisia
- Species: L. kelloggii

Binomial name
- Lewisia kelloggii K.Brandegee

= Lewisia kelloggii =

Species of flowering plant

Lewisia kelloggii is a species of flowering plant in the family Montiaceae known by the common name Kellogg's lewisia. It is endemic to the Sierra Nevada of California, where it is known from several sites high in the mountains. It grows in rocky mountain habitat in granite and slate substrates. This is a perennial herb growing from a thick, short taproot and caudex unit. It produces a basal rosette of many thick, leathery, spoon-shaped leaves up to 9 centimeters (3.5 in) long. The inflorescence bears several flowers, each on a very short stalk. The flower has 5 to 13 shiny white or pinkish petals just over a centimeter long. Under the petals are two sepals and two similar bracts lined with spherical resin glands.

A population of Lewisia plants in the Sawtooth Range in Idaho were previously included in this species. Genetic analysis has shown that it is different enough to be considered a species of its own and has been named Lewisia sacajaweana, Sacajawea's bitterroot.
