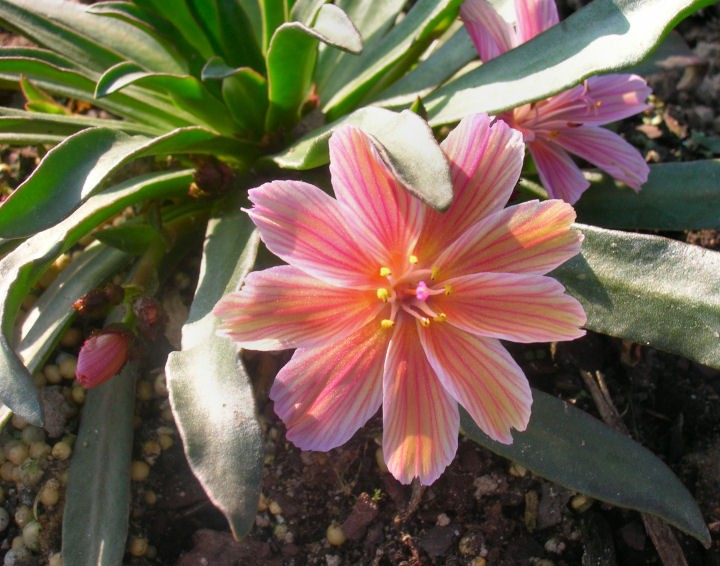
- Lewisia longipetala 'Little Plum'

Conservation status
- Imperiled (NatureServe)

Scientific classification
- Kingdom: Plantae
- Clade: Tracheophytes
- Clade: Angiosperms
- Clade: Eudicots
- Order: Caryophyllales
- Family: Montiaceae
- Genus: Lewisia
- Species: L. longipetala

Binomial name
- Lewisia longipetala (Piper) S.Clay

= Lewisia longipetala =

Species of flowering plant

Lewisia longipetala is a rare species of flowering plant in the family Montiaceae known by the common names long-petalled lewisia and Truckee lewisia. It is endemic to the Sierra Nevada of California, where it is known from less than 20 locations in areas not far from Lake Tahoe. It grows in subalpine and alpine climates in moist areas in rocky habitat, such as talus that retains patches of snow year-round. Most specimens grow on north-facing slopes with little surrounding vegetation. The plant thrives in the snow, growing largest and most densely in areas of high snowpack and becoming easily water-stressed when far away from areas with snow.

This is a perennial herb growing from a slender taproot and caudex unit. It produces a basal rosette of many thin but fleshy leaves 3 to 6 centimeters (1.2 to 2.4 in) long. The inflorescence is made up of several flowers on short stalks. Each flower has around 8 petals each between 1 and 2 centimeters (0.4 and 0.8 in) long, pinkish in color, and tipped with a resin gland similar to those on the edges of the bracts and two small sepals.

A number of hybrids of this species are popular garden plants in amenable climates, including several crosses with Lewisia cotyledon.
