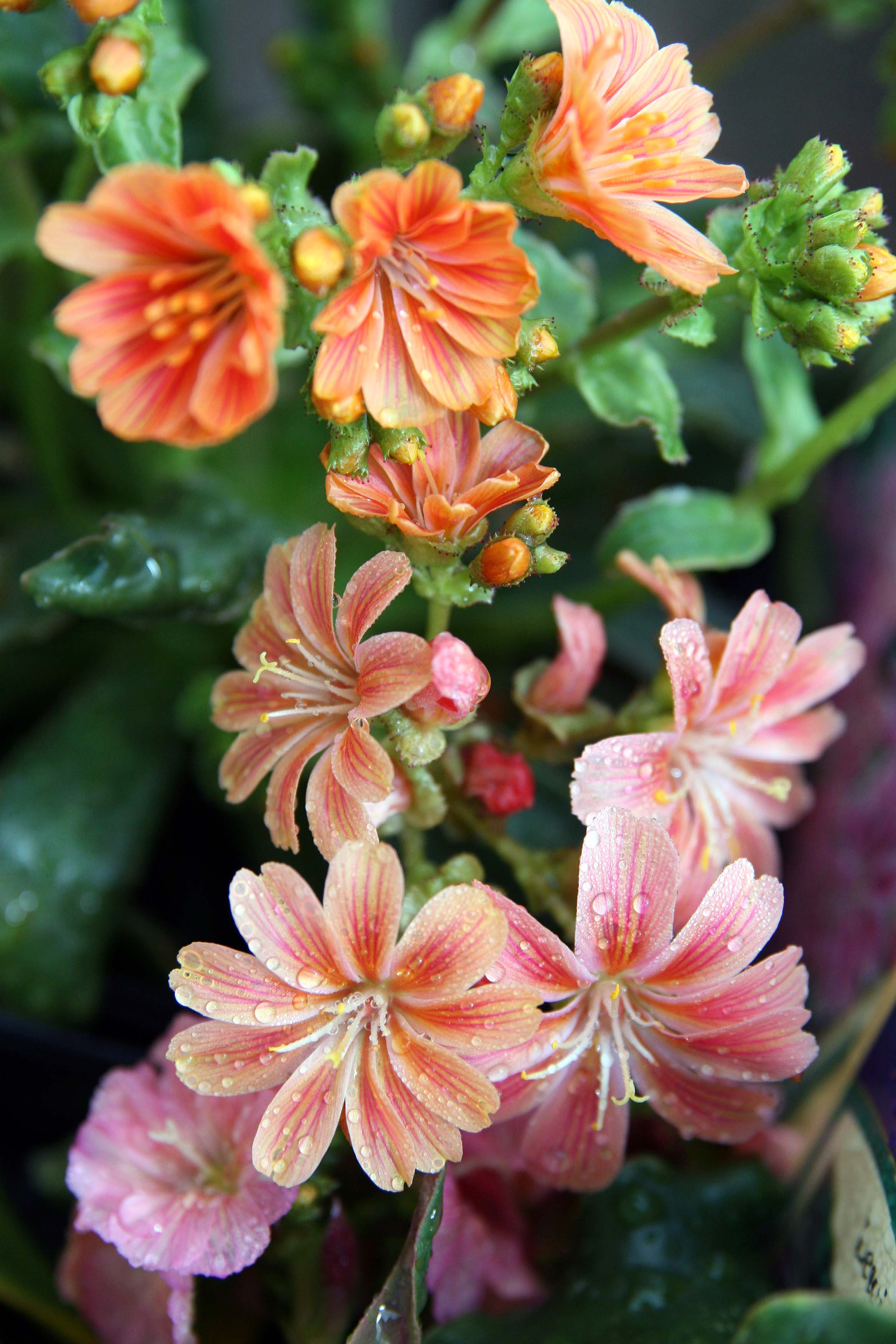
- Lewisia cotyledon 'Sunset Strain'

Scientific classification
- Kingdom: Plantae
- Clade: Embryophytes
- Clade: Tracheophytes
- Clade: Spermatophytes
- Clade: Angiosperms
- Clade: Eudicots
- Order: Caryophyllales
- Family: Montiaceae
- Genus: Lewisia; Pursh

Species
- see text

= Lewisia =

Genus of flowering plants

Lewisia is a plant genus, named for the American explorer Meriwether Lewis (1774–1809) who encountered the species in 1806. The native habitat of Lewisia species is rocky ground and cliffs in western North America. Native Americans ate the roots, which have also been used to treat sore throats.

== Characteristics ==
Lewisia are succulent perennial plants native to western North American habitats including rocky outcrops from the high elevation alpine to lower elevation chaparral, oak woodlands, and coniferous forests. They produce rosette-shaped flowers in a range of different colours.

About half of the species of Lewisia are deciduous, including the original Lewisia rediviva. Lewisia longipetala is the only semi-deciduous species. Some species, such as Lewisia cotyledon, are evergreen.

== Taxonomy ==
Meriwether Lewis, of Lewis and Clark fame, is credited with the first discovery by a European or American of Lewisia, which was known to the local Native Americans as bitterroot. Lewis discovered the specimen in 1806 at Lolo Creek, in the mountain range that became known as the Bitterroot Mountains. The plant was given its scientific name, Lewisia rediviva, by Frederick Traugott Pursh.

=== List of species ===
There are nineteen species and several varieties of Lewisia, including:

- Lewisia brachycalyx Engelm. ex A.Gray: United States (California, Arizona, Utah), Mexico (Baja California)
- Lewisia cantelovii J.T.Howell: US (California, Nevada)
- Lewisia columbiana (J.T.Howell ex A.Gray) B.L.Rob.
  - Lewisia columbiana var. columbiana: Canada (British Columbia), US (Washington, Oregon)
  - Lewisia columbiana var. rupicola (English) C.L.Hitchc.: Canada (British Columbia), US (Washington, Oregon)
  - Lewisia columbiana var. wallowensis C.L.Hitchc.: US (Idaho, Montana, Oregon)
- Lewisia congdonii (Rydb.) S.Clay: US (California)

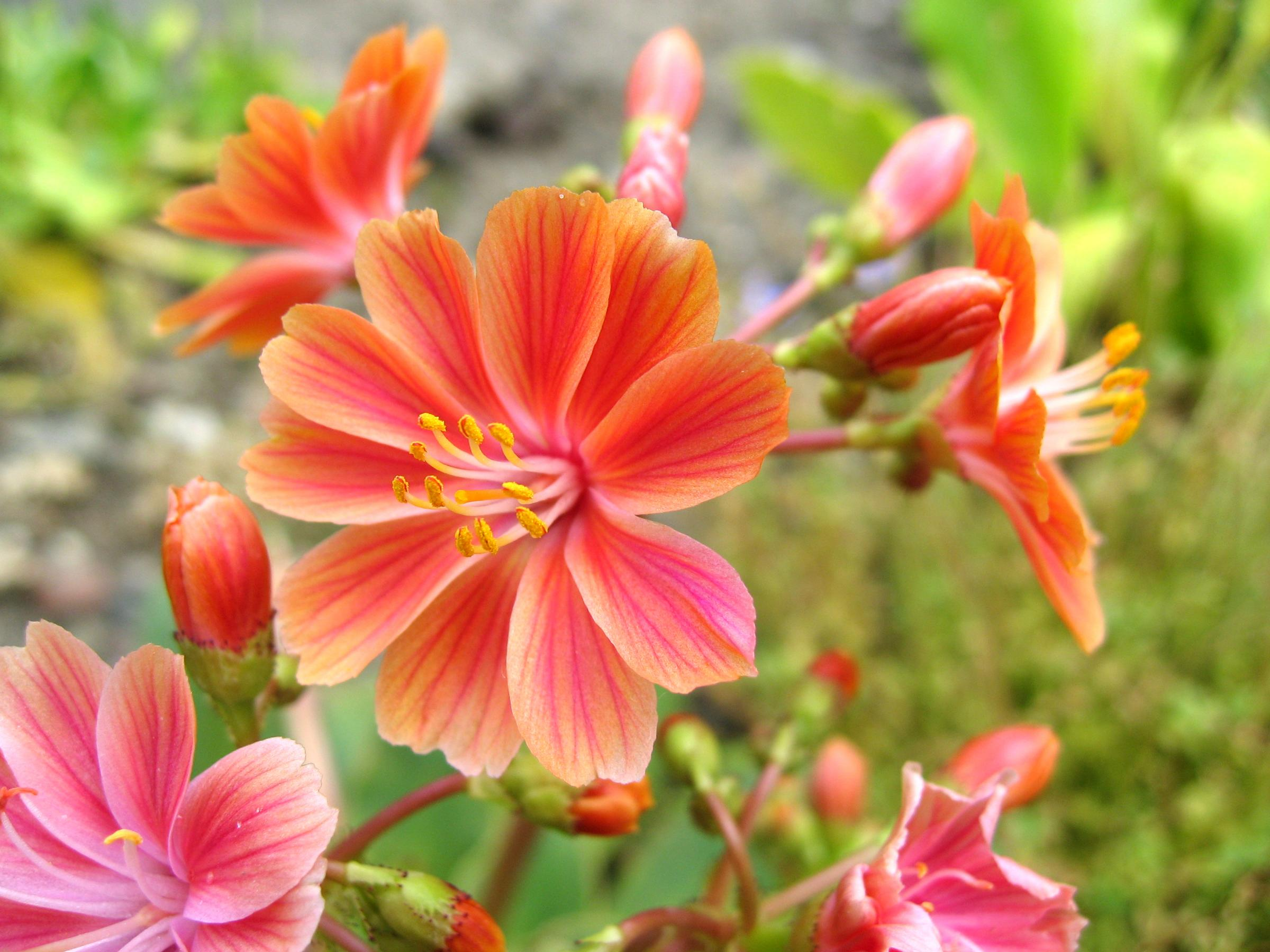
Lewisia cotyledon

- Lewisia cotyledon (S.Watson) B.L.Rob.
  - Lewisia cotyledon var. cotyledon: US (Oregon, California)
  - Lewisia cotyledon var. heckneri (C.V.Morton) Munz: US (California)
  - Lewisia cotyledon var. howellii (S.Watson) Jeps.: US (Oregon, California)
- Lewisia disepala Rydb.: US (California)
- Lewisia glandulosa (Rydb.) Dempster: US (California)
- Lewisia kelloggii K.Brandegee
  - Lewisia kelloggii var. hutchinsonii Dempster: US (California)
  - Lewisia kelloggii var. kelloggii: US (California, Idaho)
- Lewisia leeana (Porter) B.L.Rob.: US (California, Oregon)
- Lewisia longipetala (Piper) S.Clay: US (California)
- Lewisia maguirei A.H.Holmgren: US (Nevada)
- Lewisia nevadensis (A.Gray) B.L.Rob.: US (Washington, Oregon, California, Nevada, Utah, Colorado, New Mexico)
- Lewisia oppositifolia (S.Watson) B.L.Rob.: US (Oregon, California)
- Lewisia pygmaea (A.Gray) B.L.Rob.: Canada (Yukon Territory, British Columbia), US (Alaska, Washington, Oregon, Idaho, Nevada, Utah, Colorado, California, Arizona)

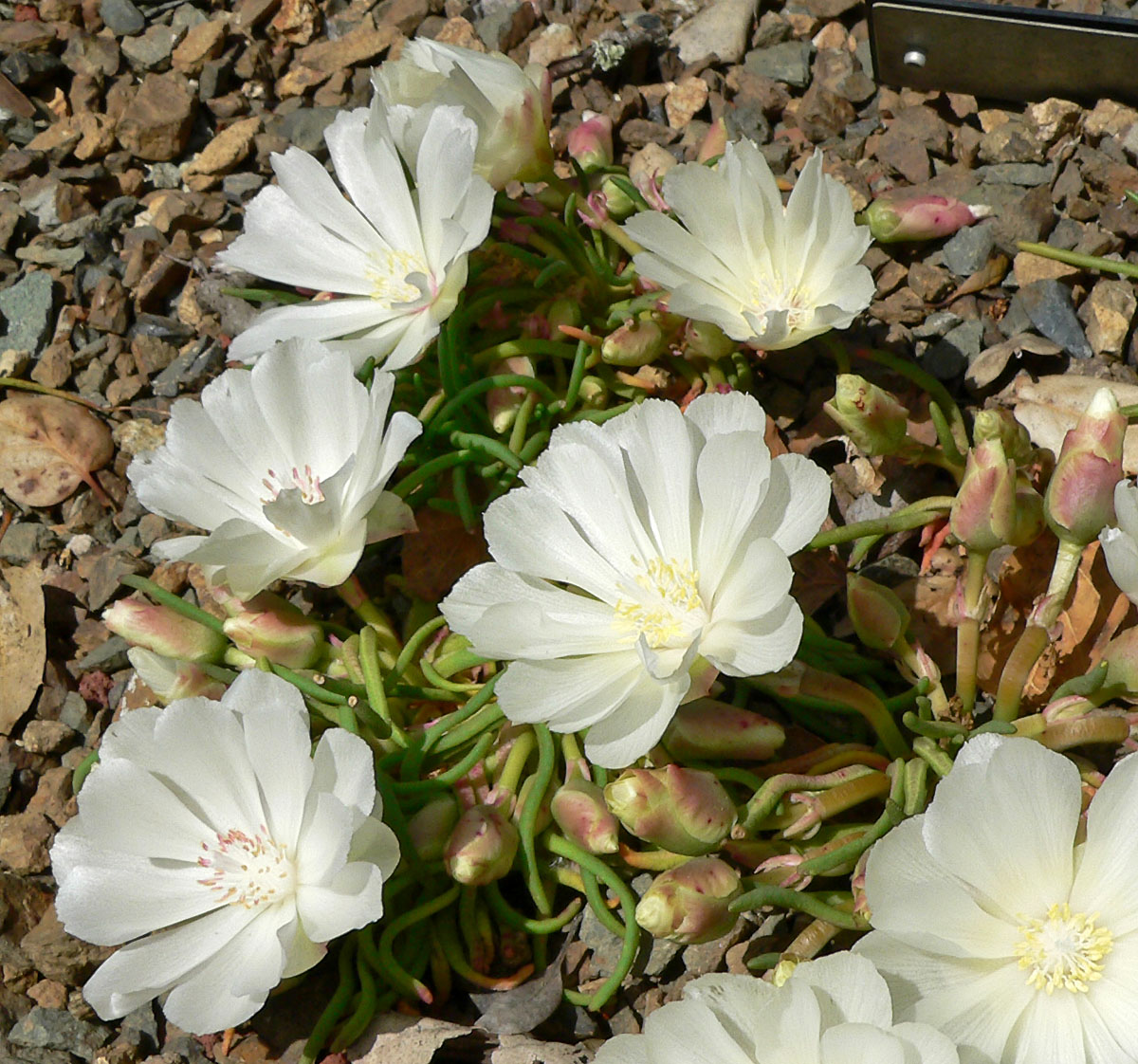
Lewisia rediviva

- Lewisia rediviva Pursh (Bitterroot; the state flower of Montana)
  - Lewisia rediviva var. minor (Rydb.) Munz: US (California, Nevada, Utah)
  - Lewisia rediviva var. rediviva: Canada (British Columbia), US (Montana, Washington, Oregon, Idaho, Wyoming, Nevada, Utah, Colorado, California, Arizona)
- Lewisia sacajaweana B.L.Wilson: US (Idaho)
- Lewisia serrata Heckard & Stebbins: US (California)
- Lewisia stebbinsii Gankin & W.R.Hildreth: US (California)
- Lewisia ×whiteae Purdy: US (Oregon) – hybrid of Lewisia leeana and Lewisia cotyledon

=== Formerly placed here ===
- Erocallis triphylla (S.Watson) Rydb. (as Lewisia triphylla (S.Watson) B.L.Rob.)

== Distribution and habitat ==
Lewisias are naturally found in western parts of North America. In their native habitat of north-facing cliffs, lewisias are subject to extremes in weather conditions.

== Uses ==
All species of Lewisia are edible. Lewisia rediviva has a large edible root and as a result became a food source for Native Americans. The root is peeled before boiling or steaming; cooking the root reduces its bitterness.

L. rediviva has also been used for medicinal purposes; chewing the root was used to relieve a sore throat and has also been used to promote milk flow during lactation.

For gardening, Lewisia species are usually planted in rockeries, because this mimics their natural habitat. Rockeries also provide the free drainage that lewisias need to prevent their roots rotting. They may also be planted in pots, though they need to be well drained and protected from sustained wet weather.
