= Lewisia maguirei =

Conservation status
- Critically Imperiled (NatureServe)

Scientific classification
- Kingdom: Plantae
- Clade: Tracheophytes
- Clade: Angiosperms
- Clade: Eudicots
- Order: Caryophyllales
- Family: Montiaceae
- Genus: Lewisia
- Species: L. maguirei

Binomial name
- Lewisia maguirei A.H.Holmgren

Species of flowering plant

Lewisia maguirei is a rare species of flowering plant in the family Montiaceae known by the common name Maguire's lewisia, or Maguire's bitterroot. It is endemic to Nevada in the United States, where it is known only from eastern Nye County.

== Description ==
This is a perennial herb growing at ground level, the stem no more than 2 centimeters (0.8 in) long. It grows from a taproot. The fleshy lance-shaped leaves are 1 to 2 centimeters (0.4 to 0.8 in) long but wither by flowering. The inflorescence contains 2 or 3 flowers. Each flower has 3 or 4 wide white or pinkish sepals and up to 9 white or pink-tinged petals each roughly a centimeter long. Blooming occurs in summer.

== Distribution and habitat ==
It grows on rocky clay and limestone slopes in open pinyon-juniper woodland at elevations around 2,240 to 2,525 meters (7,349 to 8,284 ft). Other plants in the habitat include desert green gentian (Frasera albomarginata), Torrey's milkvetch (Astragalus calycosus), stemless four-nerved daisy (Tetraneuris acaulis), Nevada onion (Allium nevadense), and rock goldenrod (Petradoria pumila).

== Conservation ==
There are only 8 known occurrences of this plant, all within an eight-kilometer radius. It is threatened by poaching, as it is attractive to collectors of alpine plants. Its rugged, high-elevation habitat helps to protect it from other threats.
