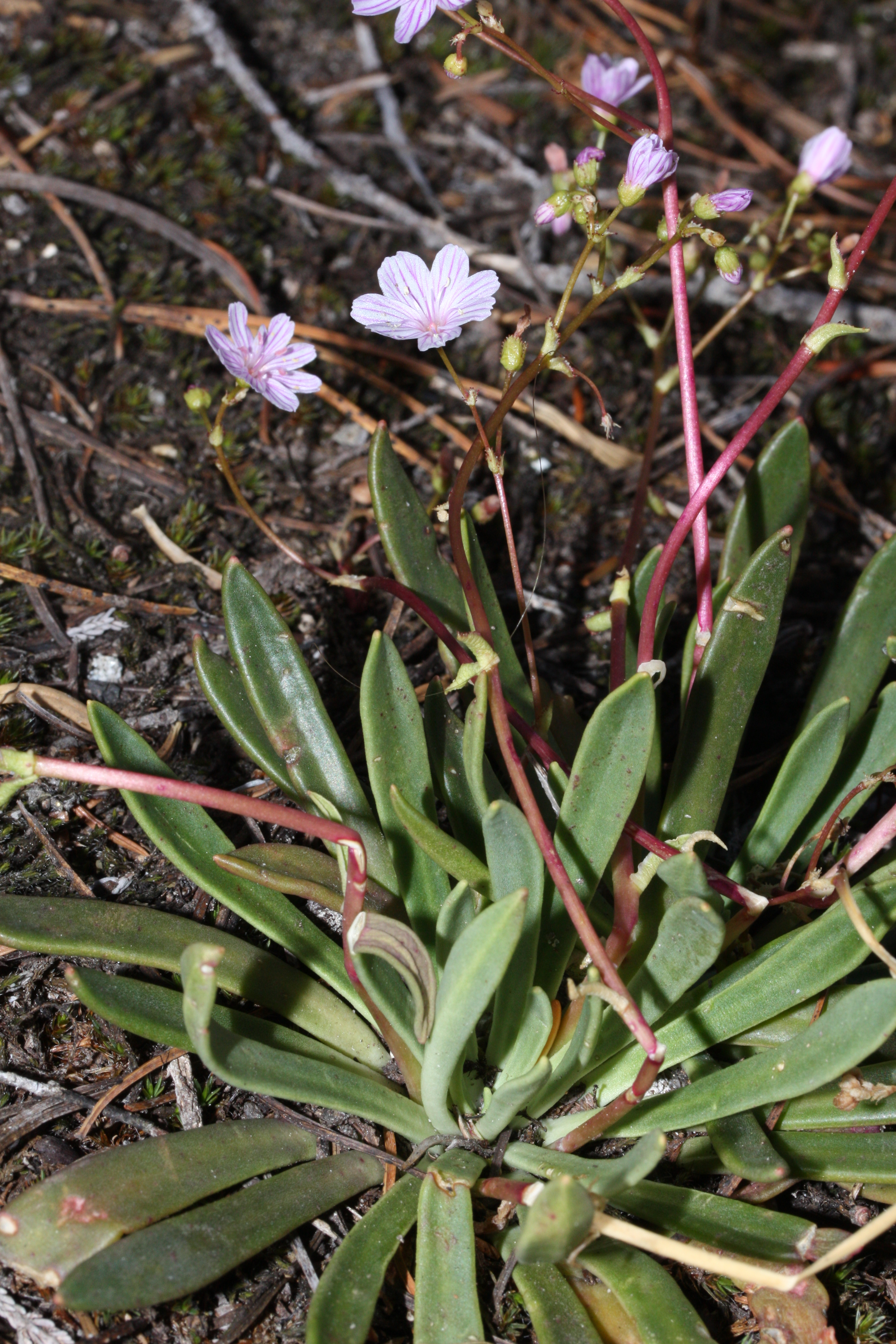
- var. columbiana

Scientific classification
- Kingdom: Plantae
- Clade: Tracheophytes
- Clade: Angiosperms
- Clade: Eudicots
- Order: Caryophyllales
- Family: Montiaceae
- Genus: Lewisia
- Species: L. columbiana

Binomial name
- Lewisia columbiana (J.T.Howell ex A.Gray) B.L.Rob.

= Lewisia columbiana =

Species of flowering plant

Lewisia columbiana, the Columbian lewisia, is a species of flowering plant in the family Montiaceae. It is native to the western United States and British Columbia, where it grows in rocky mountain habitats.

== Description ==
This herbaceous perennial grows from a short, thick taproot and caudex unit. It produces a basal rosette of many thick, fleshy, tapering, blunt-tipped or pointed leaves with smooth edges, each 2 to 10 centimeters (0.8 to 3.9 in) long. The inflorescence arises on several stems up to about 30 centimeters (12 in) tall, each stem bearing an array of up to 100 flowers each. Just under the flower are small, pointed bracts tipped with shiny spherical resin glands. The flower has 4 to 11 petals, each up to about a centimeter in length and oval in shape with a notched tip. The petals are white to pale pink, usually with sharp dark pink veining.

== Habitat ==
Lewisia columbiana grows on rocks or in gravel or rocky soil, usually in full sun. Though it grows on a variety of rock types, it is tolerant of serpentine rock.

== Gallery ==
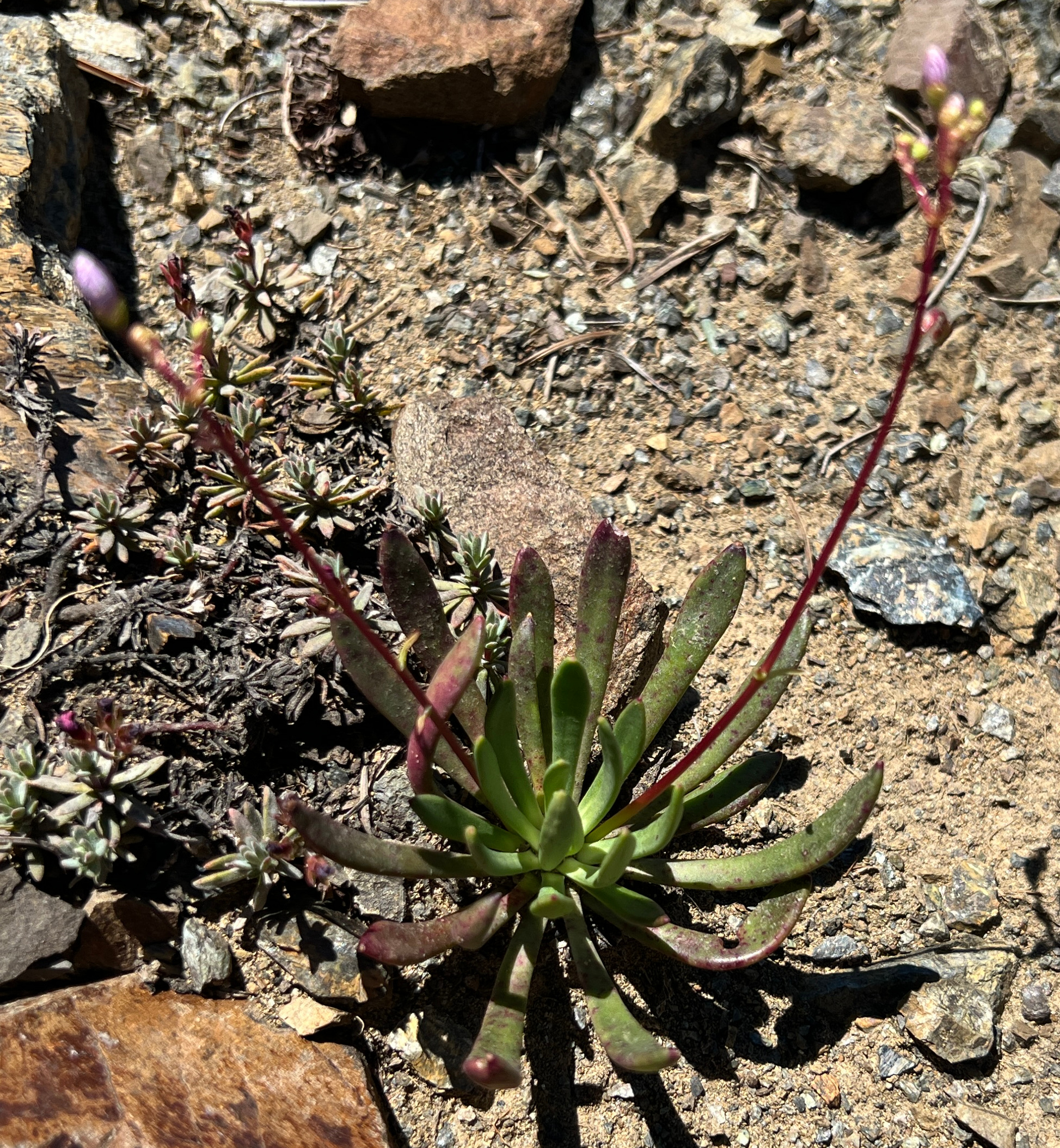
Lewisia columbiana on serpentine

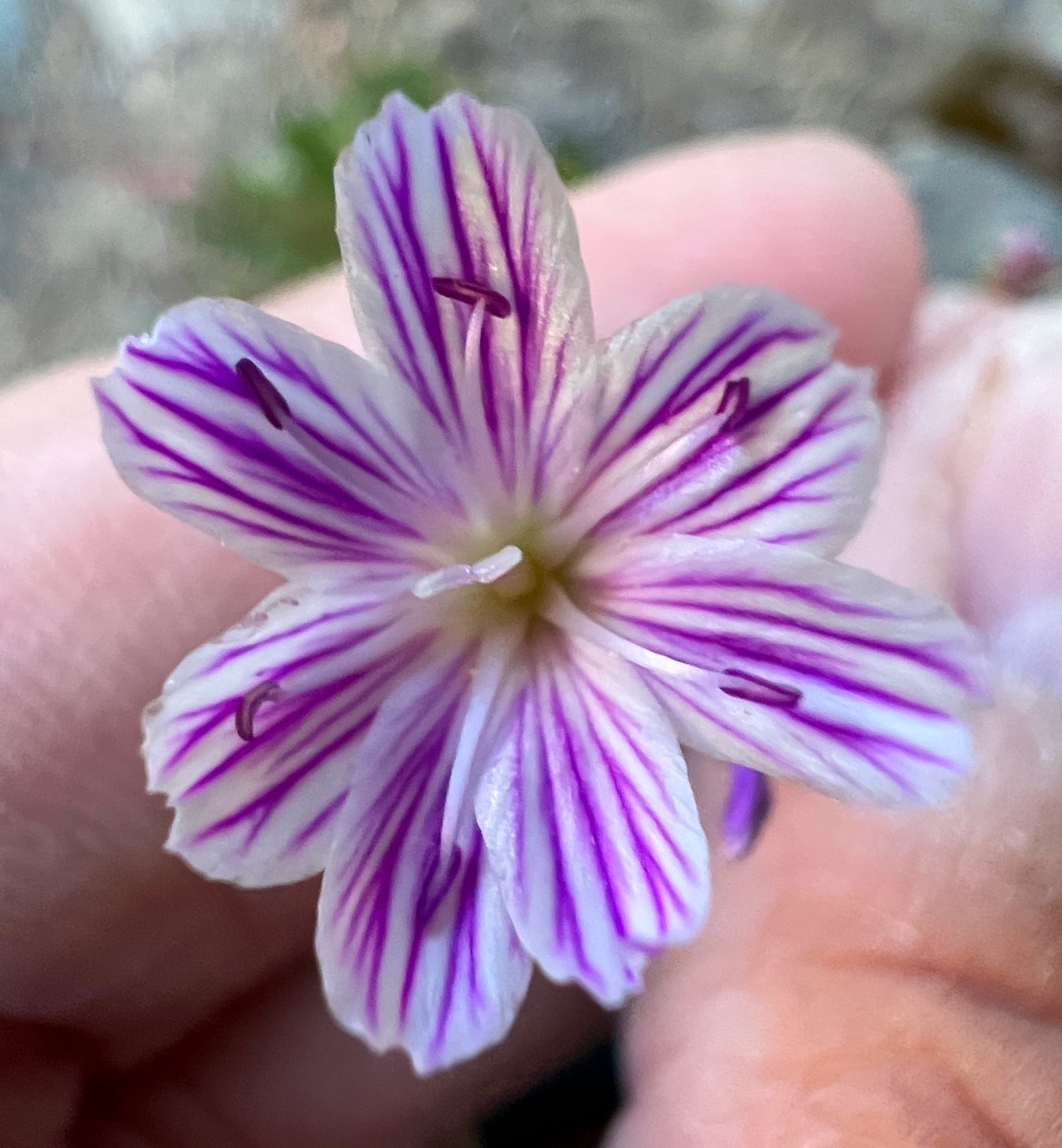
Flower closeup

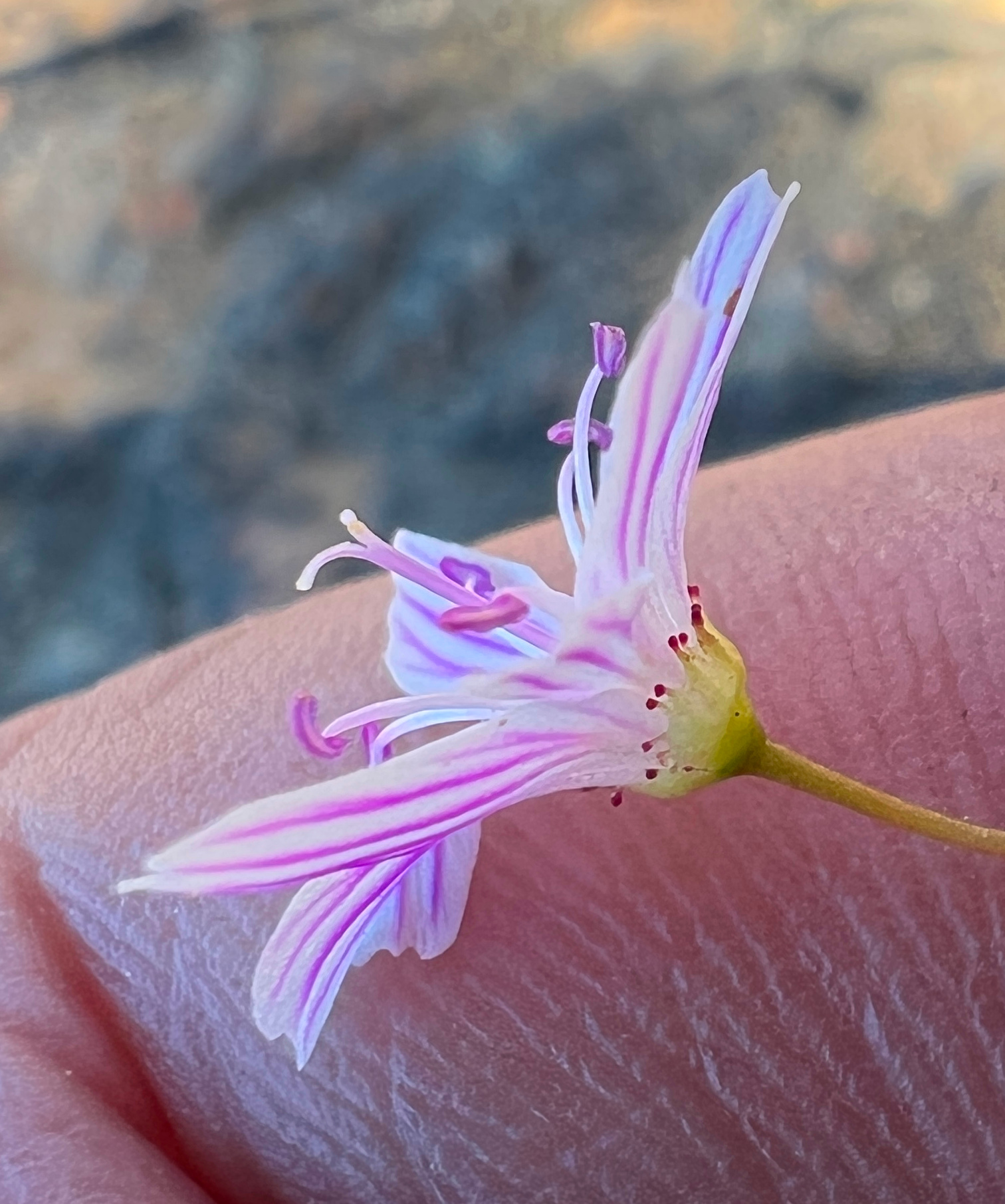
Flower bract with glands
