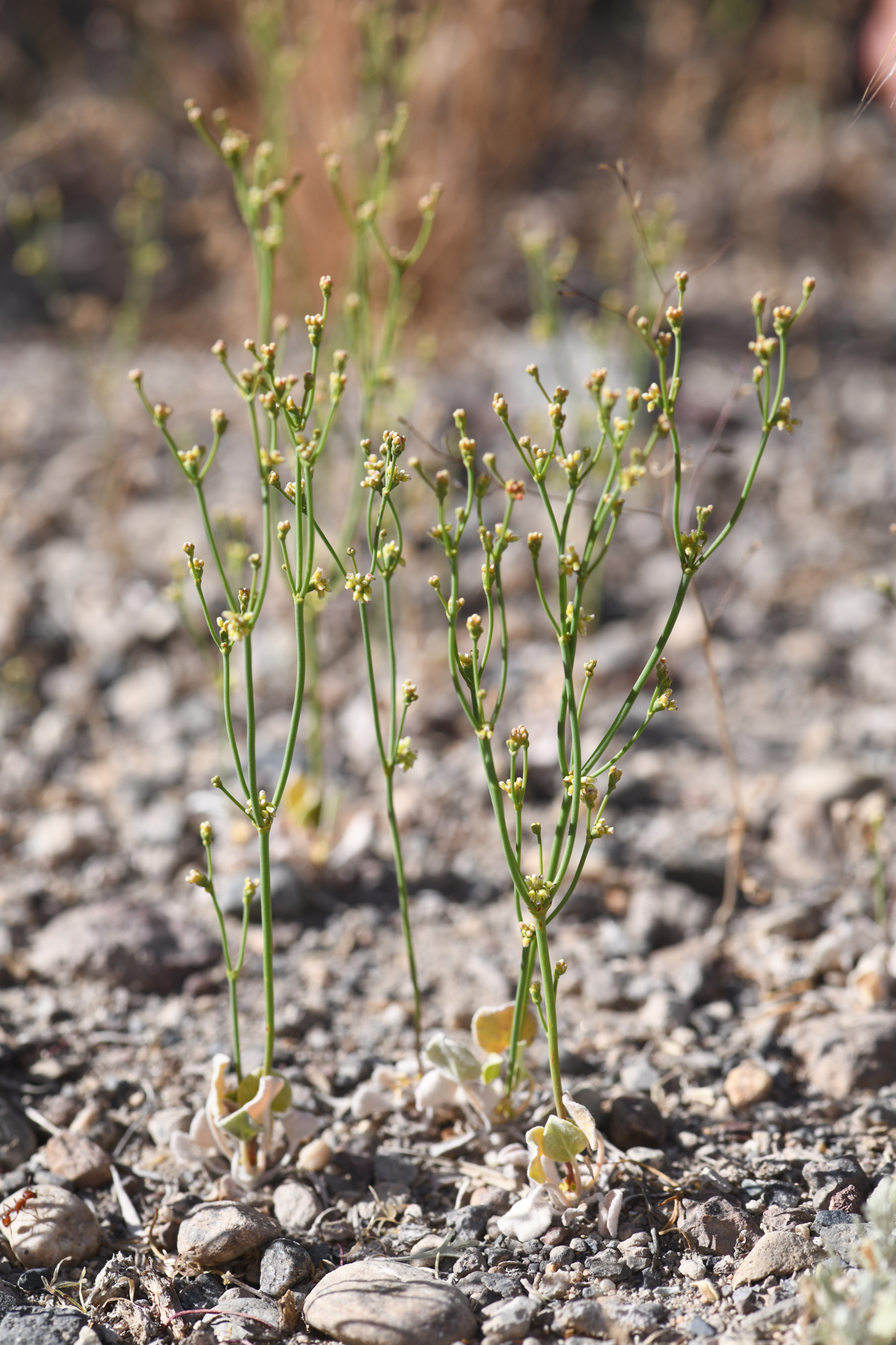

Conservation status
- Vulnerable (NatureServe)

Scientific classification
- Kingdom: Plantae
- Clade: Embryophytes
- Clade: Tracheophytes
- Clade: Angiosperms
- Clade: Eudicots
- Order: Caryophyllales
- Family: Polygonaceae
- Genus: Eriogonum
- Species: E. ampullaceum

Binomial name
- Eriogonum ampullaceum J.T.Howell

Synonyms
- Eriogonum mohavense subsp. ampullaceum

= Eriogonum ampullaceum =

Species of wild buckwheat

Eriogonum ampullaceum is a species of wild buckwheat known by the common name Mono buckwheat.

== Description ==
Eriogonum ampullaceum is an annual herb. The leaves are located about the base of the flowering stem. They are generally rounded, woolly in texture, and just a few centimeters wide.

It produces a yellow-green or reddish spindly, branching inflorescence up to 30 centimeters tall. The white flowers are less than 2 millimeters wide and appear in clusters.

== Taxonomy ==
Eriogonum ampullaceum was scientifically described in 1935 by John Thomas Howell as species in the Eriogonum genus. It was reclassified as a subspecies of Eriogonum mohavense by Susan Gabriella Stokes in 1936, but it is an accepted species according to Plants of the World Online. Together with its genus it is classified in the Polygonaceae family and has no other synonyms.

== Distribution and habitat ==
The plant is native to the western Great Basin region, on the lower eastern Sierra Nevada slopes, and eastwards along the border of California and Nevada.

It grows in Great Basin sagebrush scrub habitats, in sandy soils of high desert and plateau areas.
