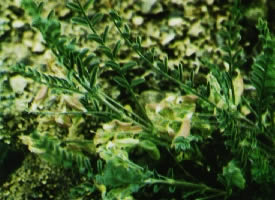

Conservation status
- Imperiled (NatureServe)

Scientific classification
- Kingdom: Plantae
- Clade: Tracheophytes
- Clade: Angiosperms
- Clade: Eudicots
- Clade: Rosids
- Order: Fabales
- Family: Fabaceae
- Subfamily: Faboideae
- Genus: Astragalus
- Species: A. johannis-howellii

Binomial name
- Astragalus johannis-howellii Barneby

= Astragalus johannis-howellii =

Species of legume

Astragalus johannis-howellii is a species of milkvetch known by the common name Long Valley milkvetch. It is native to eastern California, including Long Valley in Mono County, and its distribution extends over the border into Nevada. It is a plant of the Great Basin's scrub habitat.

This is a small perennial herb forming loose clumps of very thin branching stems up to 20 centimetres long. The leaves are a few centimetres long and are made up of many tiny folded oval-shaped leaflets. The inflorescence holds 6 to 12 off-white pale-striped flowers, each a few millimetres long. The fruit is a hanging legume pod up to a centimeter in length, thinly hairy and papery in texture. This species was named for the botanist John Thomas Howell.
