= Banna, Bangladesh =

Town in Barisal Division, Bangladesh

Coordinates: 22°48′0″N 90°13′0″E

Banna is a town in the Barisal Division of Bangladesh. It is located at 22°48'0N 90°13'0E and has an altitude of 1 metres (6 feet). Its average sunrise time is 1:30:56 and its average sunset time is 12:55:30. It is surrounded by the towns of Bankati, Chakhar Union, and Barapaika.
