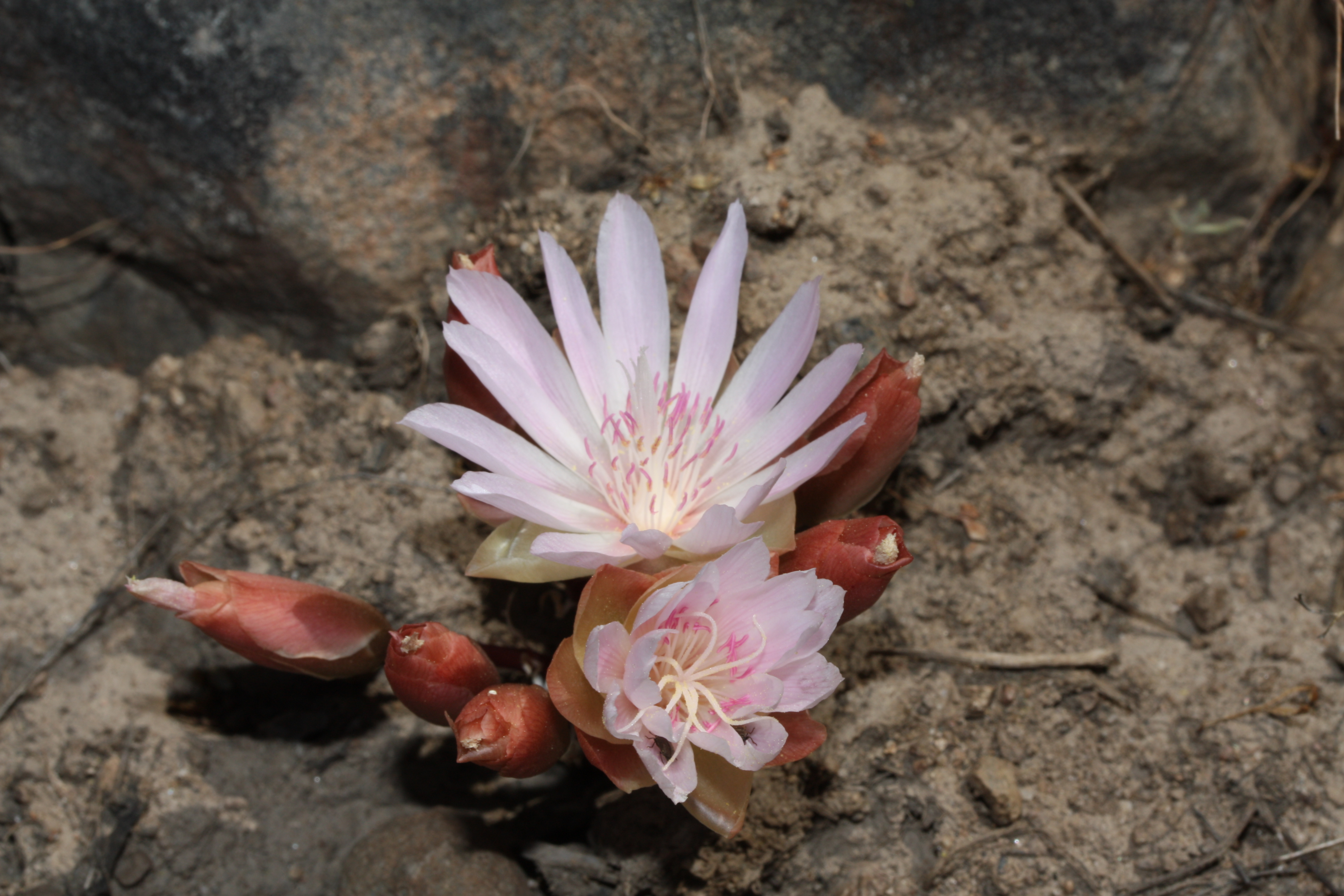
- Lewisia rediviva var. rediviva in Wenas Wildlife Area, Washington

Conservation status
- Secure (NatureServe)

Scientific classification
- Kingdom: Plantae
- Clade: Tracheophytes
- Clade: Angiosperms
- Clade: Eudicots
- Order: Caryophyllales
- Family: Montiaceae
- Genus: Lewisia
- Species: L. rediviva

Binomial name
- Lewisia rediviva Pursh

Varieties
- L. rediviva var. minor; L. rediviva var. rediviva

Synonyms
- List: Lewisia alba Kellogg; Lewisia minor Rydb.; Lewisia rediviva subsp. minor (Rydb.) A.H.Holmgren

= Bitterroot =

Plant species in the springbeauty family

Bitterroot (Lewisia rediviva) is a small perennial herb in the family Montiaceae. Its specific epithet rediviva ("revived, reborn") refers to its ability to regenerate from dry and seemingly dead roots.

The genus Lewisia was moved in 2009 from the purslane family (Portulacaceae) with adoption of the APG III system, to the family Montiaceae.

== Description ==
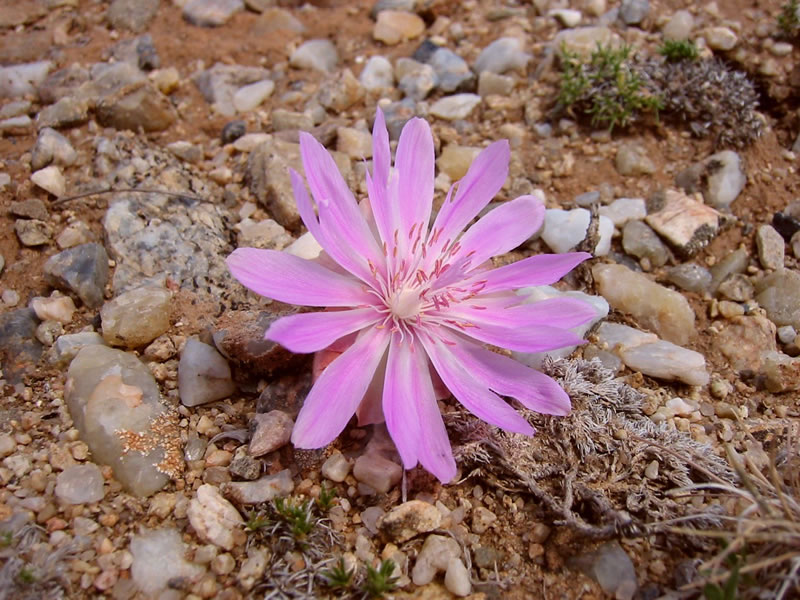
Bitterroot flower

Lewisia rediviva is a low-growing perennial plant with a fleshy taproot and a simple or branched base and a low rosette of thick fleshy linear leaves with blunt tips. The leaves are roughly circular in cross section, sometimes somewhat flattened on the adaxial (top) surface. The absence of an adaxial groove on the leaves distinguishes this from other Lewisia species with overlapping ranges. The leaves often wither before flowers open.

The very short flower stems are leafless, 1–3 centimetres (3/8–1 1/8 in) tall, bearing at the tip a whorl of 5–6 linear bracts which are 5–10 mm long. A single proportionally huge flower appears on each stem with 5–9 oval-shaped sepals and many petals. Each flower has between ten and nineteen petals that measure 15 to 35 millimetres (5/8 to 1 3/8 in) long. They range in color from whitish to deep pink or lavender. Flowering occurs from April through July. At maturity, the bitterroot produces egg-shaped capsules with 6–20 nearly round seeds.

== Distribution ==
The plant is native to western North America from low to moderate elevations on grassland, open bushland, forest in dry rocky or gravelly soils. Its range extends from southern British Columbia, through Washington and Oregon west of the Cascade Range to southern California, and east to western Montana, Idaho, Wyoming, northern Colorado and northern Arizona.

== Uses ==
The thick roots come into season in spring and can survive extremely dry conditions. If collected early enough in the season, they can be peeled, boiled, and made into a jelly-like food.

== History and culture ==
French trappers knew the plant as racine amère (bitter root). Native American names include spetlum/sp̓eƛ̓m̓ or spetlem ("hand-peeled"), nakamtcu (Ktunaxa: naqam¢u), and mo'ȯhtáeheséeo'ȯtse (Cheyenne, "black medicine").

The roots were consumed by tribes such as the Shoshone and the Flathead Indians as an infrequent delicacy. Traditionally, the Ktunaxa cooked bitterroot with grouse. For the Ktunaxa, bitterroot is eaten with sugar; other tribes prefer eating it with salt. The Lemhi Shoshone believed the small red core found in the upper taproot had special powers, notably being able to stop a bear attack. Plains Indians peeled and boiled the root prior to its consumption. Nlaka'pamux traditional knowledge holds that when saskatoonberry, chokecherry, and arrowleaf balsamroot start blooming, bitterroot is ready to be dug up and harvested.

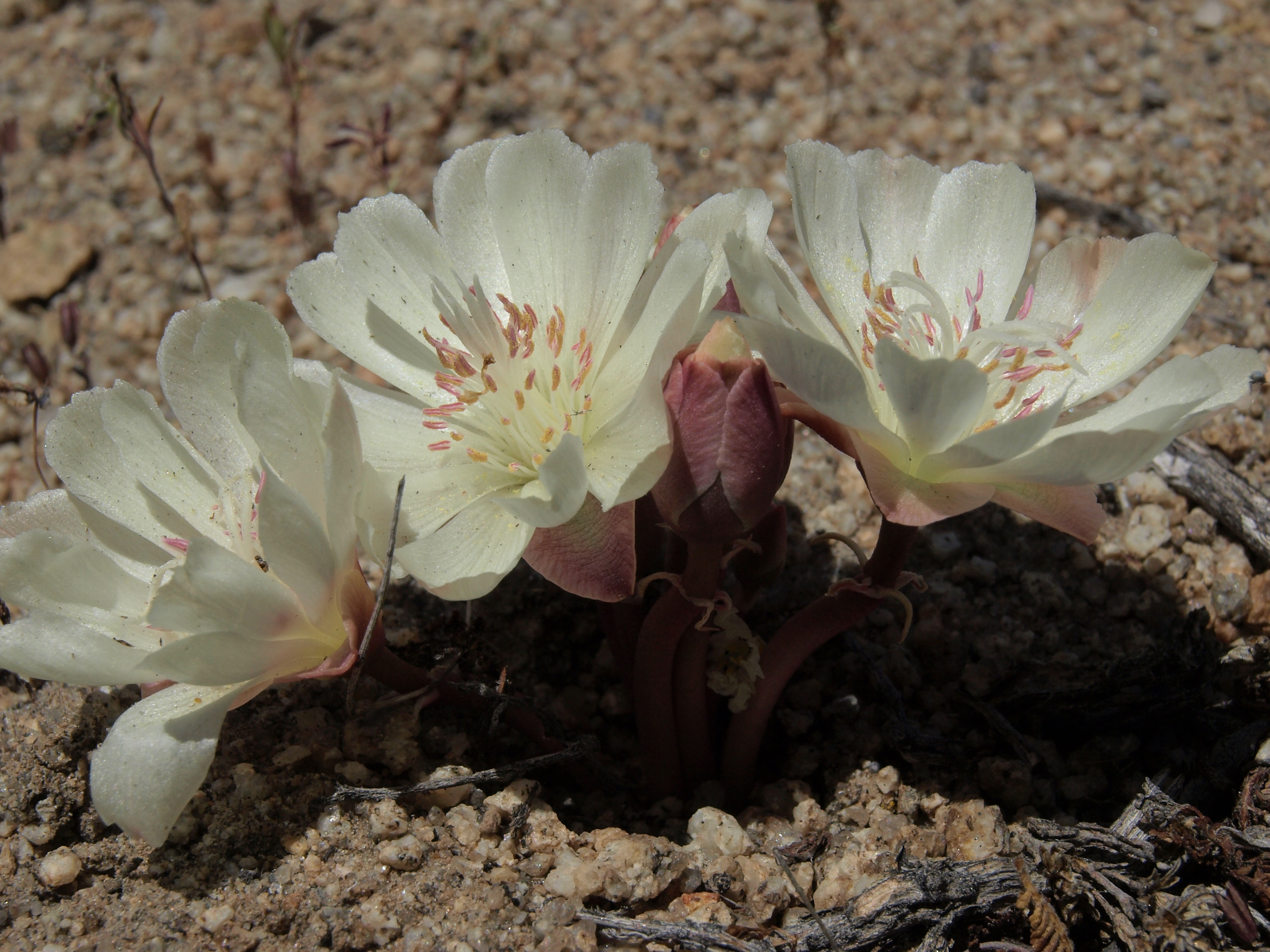
L. rediviva var. rediviva, Glass Mountain, Owens Valley, California

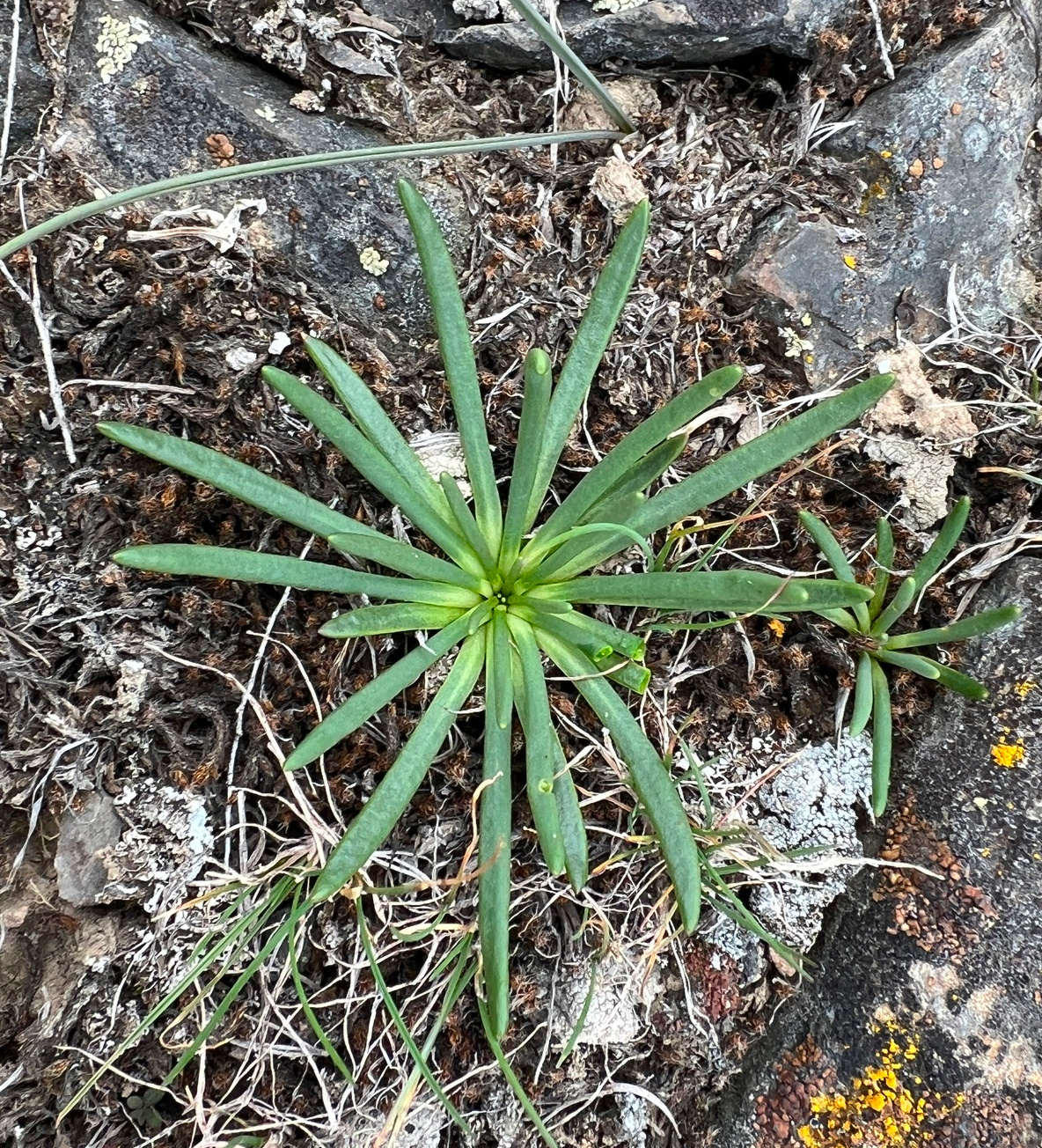
Before flowering

Meriwether Lewis ate bitterroot in 1805 and 1806 during the Lewis and Clark Expedition. The specimens he brought back were identified and given their scientific name, Lewisia rediviva, by a German-American botanist, Frederick Pursh. Based on Lewis and Clark's manuscript, Pursh labeled it "spatlum"; this apparently was actually a Salishan name for "tobacco".

The bitterroot was selected as the Montana state flower in 1895.

Three major geographic features – the Bitterroot Mountains (running north–south and forming the divide between Idaho and Montana), the Bitterroot Valley, and the Bitterroot River (which flows south–north, terminating in the Clark Fork river in the city of Missoula) – owe the origins of their names to this flower.
