= Wolf Creek (Nevada County, California) =

- Location within California

Location
- Country: United States
- State: California
- County: Nevada County

Physical characteristics
- Source: Banner Mountain
  - location: Sierra Nevada Mountains, California
  - elevation: 3,000 feet (910 m)
- Mouth: Bear River
  - coordinates: 39.03393°N 121.13092°W
  - elevation: 1,200 feet (370 m)
- Length: 25 mi (40 km)
- Basin size: 78 sq mi (200 km^{2})

Wolf Creek is a waterway in Nevada County, California, US. The creek is 25 miles (40 km) long. The watershed, approximately 78 square miles (200 km^{2}), is heavily mined. Most of the creek is situated in the lower montane zone. Its altitude ranges between 3,000 feet (910 m) (headwaters at Banner Mountain, also known as Banner Hill) to 1,200 feet (370 m) (confluence with the Bear River). Vegetation in the valley varies from alpine pines at higher elevations, to blue pines at mid elevations, and ponderosa pine mixed with evergreen forests at lower elevations. From 1850 to 1950 gold was mined in the rich formations of the Mother Lode in the heart of Banner Mountain.

== Geography ==
The creek's watershed area is 78 miles (125.53 km), which consists almost entirely of the lower montane zone where the incidence of snowfall precipitation is comparatively low. The elevation range is between 3,000 feet (910 m) at the headwaters to about 1,200 feet (370 m) at its confluence with the Bear River. The river course from the source to its confluence is about 25 miles (40 km) and the flow is in the north–south direction, which is helpful in the development of productive and diverse ecosystems. Wolf Creek, along with its tributaries, forms a major tributary of the Bear River. It is part of the upper region of the Bear River watershed. Bear River drains into the Feather River, which joins the Sacramento River, which finally debouches into San Francisco Bay.

The larger part of the Banner Mountain area in the southern part of its tract is drained by Wolf Creek. From Grass Valley, it runs south without larger tributaries. At Grass Valley, it forks into two creeks, which have a general east–west direction. The fall varies from 50 feet (15 m) to the mile in the Grass Valley basin to 130 feet (40 m) in the vicinity of the Omaha mine. The smaller tributaries to the creek flow with gentle grade over the undulating, plateau-like country, forming marshes at their sources, but on approaching the main stream they descend to it with a steep, torrential grade. East of Osborne Hill the drainage is toward Rattlesnake Creek, a tributary of Wolf Creek.

The watershed formed by Wolf Creek and the mountain range draining it exhibits moderate Mediterranean climate with marked variations between the seasons. The winters are wet and cold with temperature in the range of 36 °F (2 °C) to 55 °F (13 °C). The summers are dry and hot with temperature varying from 75 °F (24 °C) to 95 °F (35 °C). The annual precipitation reported is about 54 inches (1,400 mm). During winter, the snow precipitation on the mountain is heavy with several feet of snow.

== History ==
The creek's watershed has had a fair amount of human habitation of indigenous people who have always depended, for their economic survival, on the biodiversity of the valley. The Tsi Akim Maidu and the Nisenan were resident in the valley when the European settlers arrived here. They were the traditional hunter/gatherers who practiced proto-agriculture, which is considered as an effective practice with the least effect on the environment. The Wolf Creek watershed, in Grass Valley and Nevada City, became famous on account of its gold deposits which were discovered as Mother Lode formations in the heart of the Banner Mountain, one year after the Sutter's Mill discovery. Following this find, gold extraction started in 1850 with large number of hardrock mines, and lasted for 100 years until 1950. According to reports, this Wolf Creek watershed had the largest concentration of hard rock mines in California. Some of these include the Cedar Mine, the Badger Hill vein on the creek's south fork, and the Washington vein.

== Flora and fauna ==
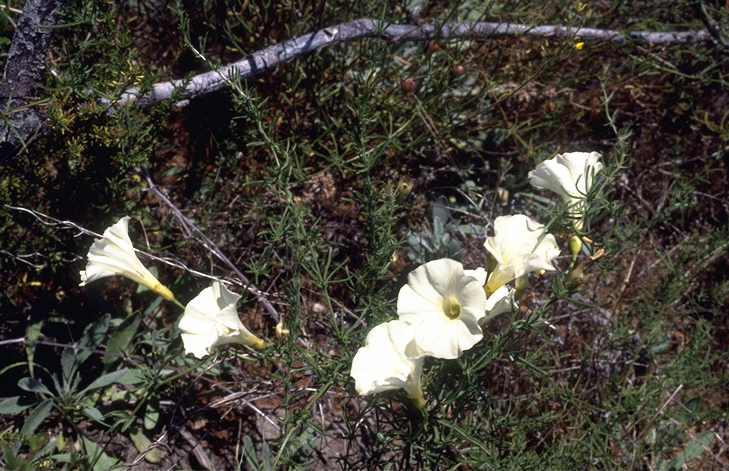
Stebbins' morning glory

The biodiversity of the narrow watershed of the creek is very rich in flora, with cold alpine species at higher elevations, changing to the blue oak and gray pine woodlands at middle elevations and then gradually transforming into the ponderosa pine mixed with evergreen forests in the lowland zones. Based on data reported by the California Natural Diversity Database (CNDDB), the floral species recorded in the watershed of the creek consist of Scadden flat checkerbloom (endangered), Brandegee’s clarkia, brownish beaked-rush, red-anthered rush, Red Hills soaproot, Stebbins' morning glory, Follett's monardella, Pine Hill flannelbush (endangered), Norris’s beard-moss, elongate copper-moss, Cantelow’s lewisia, Butte County fritillary and bog club-moss.

The faunal species reported from the watershed of the creek as reported in the California Natural Diversity Database are California spotted owl, California red-legged frog (threatened), coast horned lizard, elderberry beetle, foothill yellow-legged frog, great grey owl, northern goshawk, northwestern pond turtle and the Pacific fisher.
