= Johanneshowellia =

Scientific classification
- Kingdom: Plantae
- Clade: Tracheophytes
- Clade: Angiosperms
- Clade: Eudicots
- Order: Caryophyllales
- Family: Polygonaceae
- Genus: Johanneshowellia; Reveal

Genus of plants

Johanneshowellia is a genus of flowering plants belonging to the family Polygonaceae.

Its native range is south-western USA. It is found in the states of California, Nevada and Utah.

The genus name of Johanneshowellia is in honour of John Thomas Howell (1903–1994), an American botanist and taxonomist. It was first described and published in Brittonia Vol.56 on page 299 in 2004.

Known species, according to Kew:

- Johanneshowellia crateriorum Reveal
- Johanneshowellia puberula (S.Watson) Reveal
