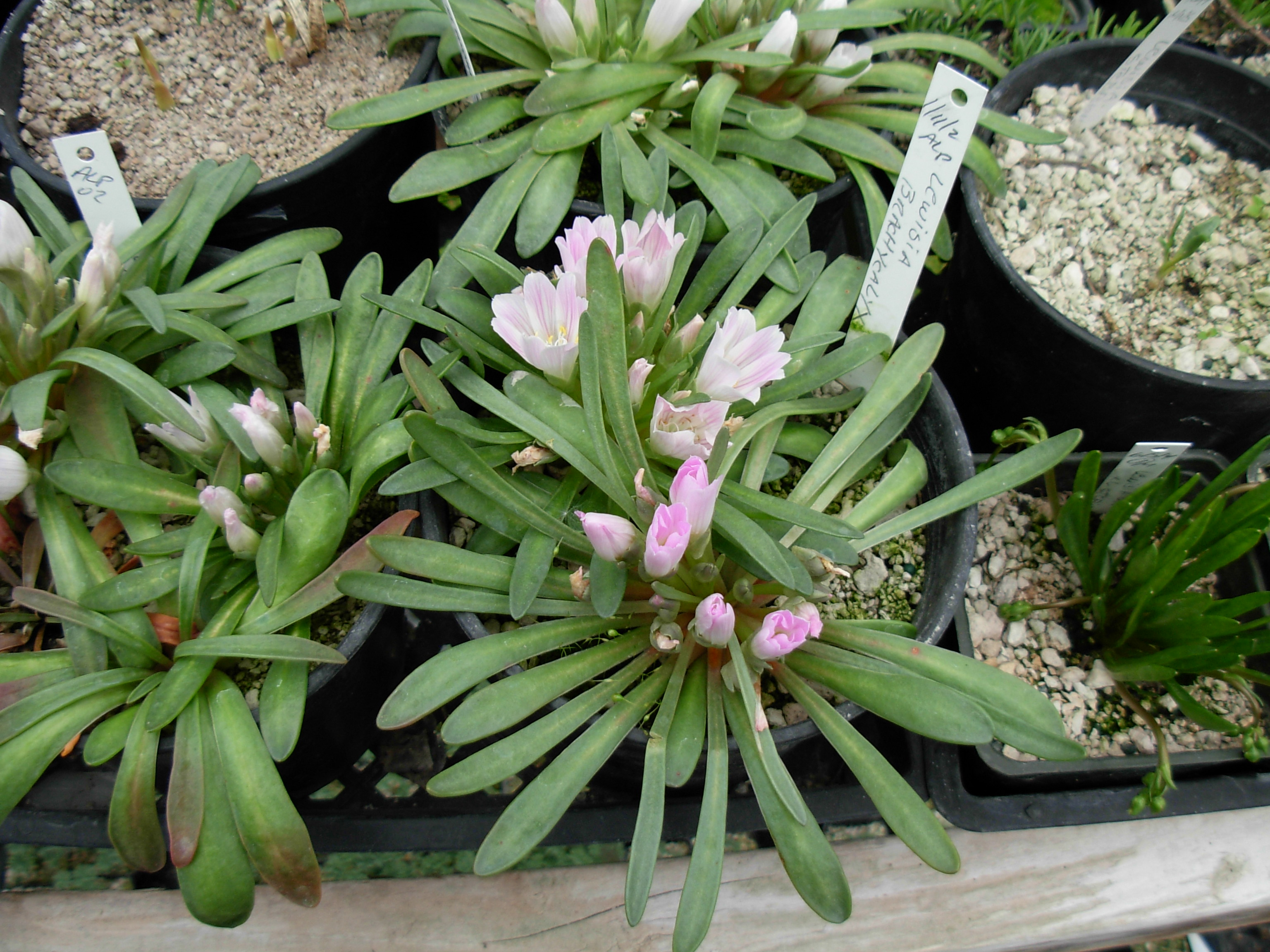

Scientific classification
- Kingdom: Plantae
- Clade: Tracheophytes
- Clade: Angiosperms
- Clade: Eudicots
- Order: Caryophyllales
- Family: Montiaceae
- Genus: Lewisia
- Species: L. brachycalyx

Binomial name
- Lewisia brachycalyx Engelm. ex A.Gray

= Lewisia brachycalyx =

Species of flowering plant

Lewisia brachycalyx is a species of flowering plant in the family Montiaceae, known by the common name short-sepal bitter-root or shortsepal lewisia. It is native to the mountains of the southwestern United States and Baja California, where it grows in moist habitat such as meadows.

== Description ==
Lewisia brachycalyx is a deciduous perennial growing from a short thick taproot and caudex unit. It produces a basal rosette of thick, fleshy, blunt-tipped narrow leaves up to 8 centimeters (3.1 in) long. The inflorescence is under 4 centimeters (1.6 in) tall, taking the form of a cluster of several flowers sitting atop the leaf rosette. Each flower has 5 to 9 shiny white or pink petals about 2 centimeters (0.8 in) long. At the center are many stamens and stigmas clumped together. The Latin specific epithet brachycalyx means "having a short calyx".

The genus Lewisia was moved in 2009 from the purslane family (Portulacaceae) with adoption of the APG III system, which established the family Montiaceae.

== Cultivation ==
This plant is hardy down to −10 °C (14 °F) but requires well-drained, acid to neutral pH soil in full sun. It becomes dormant after flowering in the summer. It is a suitable subject for an alpine garden where it can be given the conditions that best replicate its natural habitat. It has gained the Royal Horticultural Society's Award of Garden Merit.
