= Banner (surname) =

Banner is an English surname. Notable people with the surname include:

People:

- Arthur Banner (1918–1980), English footballer and manager
- Billy Banner (1878–1936), English footballer
- Bob Banner (1921–2011), American producer, writer and director
- Catherine Banner (born 1989), British author
- Charles Banner, Baron Banner (born 1980), British lawyer and politician
- David Banner (born 1974), American rapper, record producer and activist
- Fiona Banner (born 1966), British artist
- Harmood Banner (1783–1865), British accountant whose company was the origin of the accountancy firm Coopers & Lybrand
- Jérôme Le Banner (born 1972), French kickboxer
- Joe Banner (born 1953), former National Football League executive
- John Banner (1910–1973), Austrian actor who played Sgt. Schultz on the TV show Hogan's Heroes
- Lois Banner (born 1939), American feminist academic
- Michael Banner (born 1961), Dean and Fellow of Trinity College, Cambridge
- Mitch Banner (born 1990), former Australian Rules Football player
- Penny Banner (1934–2008), American wrestler
- Peter Banner (1749/50–1835), English-born architect and builder in the early 19th century
- Peter Banner (rugby league) (1948–2025), English rugby league player
- Zach Banner (born 1993), American football player

Fictional characters:

- Dr. Bruce Banner/Dr. David Bruce Banner, the alter ego of The Incredible Hulk
  - Bruce Banner (Marvel Cinematic Universe), the 21st-century film version of this superhero
- Betty Ross Banner, a Marvel Comics character whose alter ego is the Red She-Hulk
- Brian Banner, a Marvel Comics villain; abusive father of Bruce Banner
- Rex Banner, the Beer Baron in The Simpsons
- Lyman Banner, from the anime series Yu-Gi-Oh! GX
