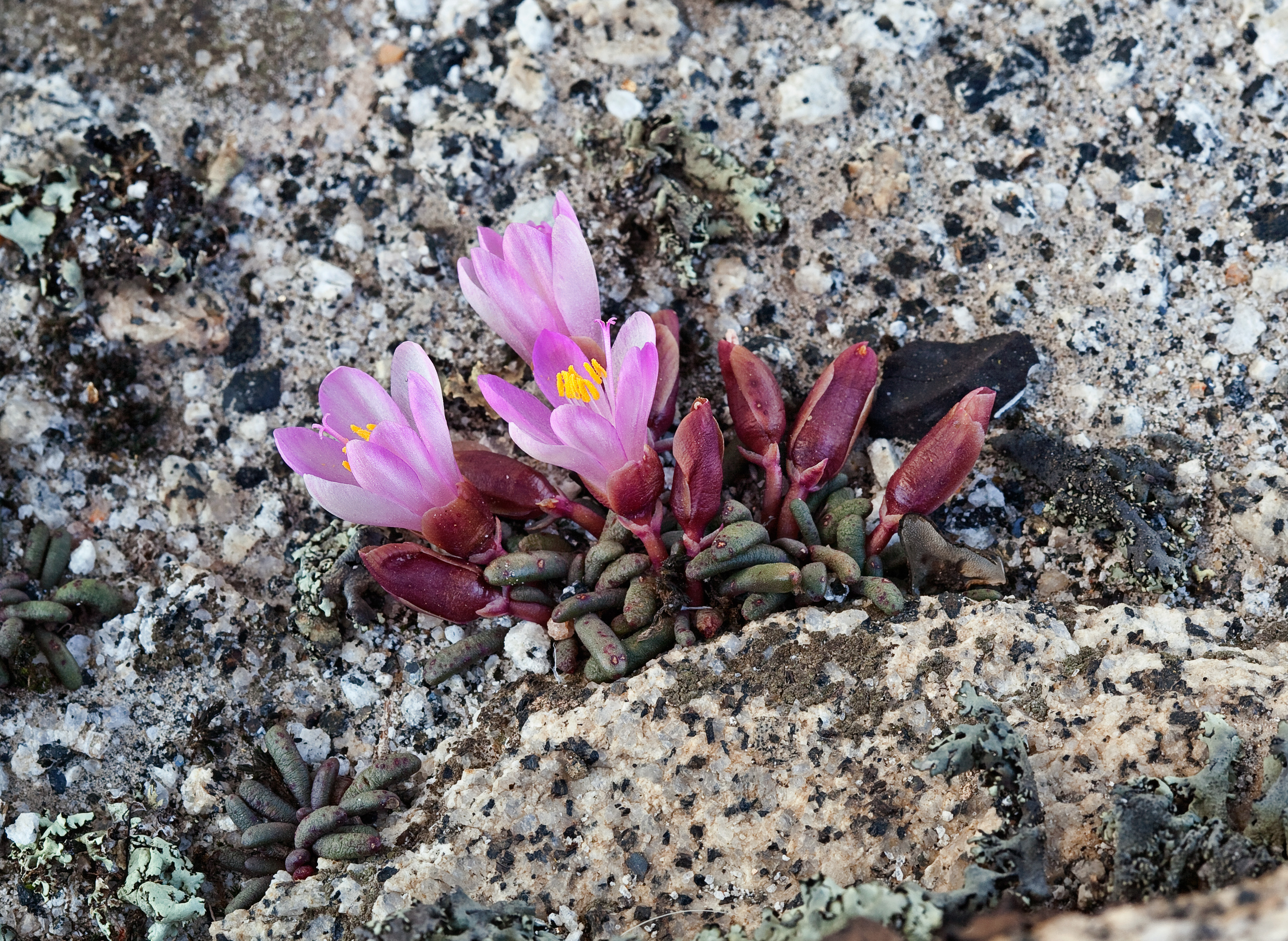

Conservation status
- Imperiled (NatureServe)

Scientific classification
- Kingdom: Plantae
- Clade: Tracheophytes
- Clade: Angiosperms
- Clade: Eudicots
- Order: Caryophyllales
- Family: Montiaceae
- Genus: Lewisia
- Species: L. disepala

Binomial name
- Lewisia disepala Rydb.

= Lewisia disepala =

Species of flowering plant

Lewisia disepala is a species of flowering plant in the family Montiaceae known by the common name Yosemite lewisia.

== Description ==
Lewisia disepala is a petite perennial herb growing from a thick branching taproot and short caudex unit. It produces a basal rosette of many small leaves no more than 1.5 centimeters (0.59 in) long. The leaves are thick, fleshy, hairless, deep shiny green, and club-shaped, knobby, or finger-like, clumped tightly together. The inflorescence has a stem so short that the flowers sit directly on the basal rosette of leaves, or among them. Each flower has 5 to 8 pale to bright pink oval petals and 15 protruding stamens.

== Distribution ==
Lewisia disepala is endemic to the Sierra Nevada of California, where it is known from several sites high in the mountains. It grows in rocky mountain habitat such as talus and open beds of bare gravel.
