= Banner (administrative division) =

Banner is a type of administrative division, and may more specifically refer to:

== Compilation from Qing Dynasty era ==
- The Eight Banners are former administrative divisions of China into which all Manchu households were placed, primarily for military purposes.
- Banner (Qosighun or khoshun) as former division of all Mongols under Qing rule (includes Inner/Outer Mongolia) grouped in aimag (league), sometimes transcribed by hoshuns or khoshuns, were the battalion level of administrative/military subdivision in the Mongol army.
- Banner (Inner Mongolia) as an administrative division of Inner Mongolia Autonomous Region in the People's Republic of China, equivalent to a Chinese county (縣|县[xiàn]) in the rest of China.
  - An Autonomous banner is an area associated with one or more ethnic minorities designated as autonomous within the People's Republic of China.
- Kozhuun, subdivisions of former Tannu Uriankhai and now Russian Tuva.

== Anatolia ==
- A Bandon (Byzantine Empire) was the lowest Byzantine administrative-cum-military unit. "Bandon" means "banner".
- Sanjak, literally "a banner, flag", was the original first level subdivision of the Ottoman Empire.

== Arab world ==
- Liwa, an Arabic term meaning "banner" is a type of administrative division. Used in conjunction with the Ottoman–era term sancağı, denoting a region or district.

== See also ==
- Banner (disambiguation)
