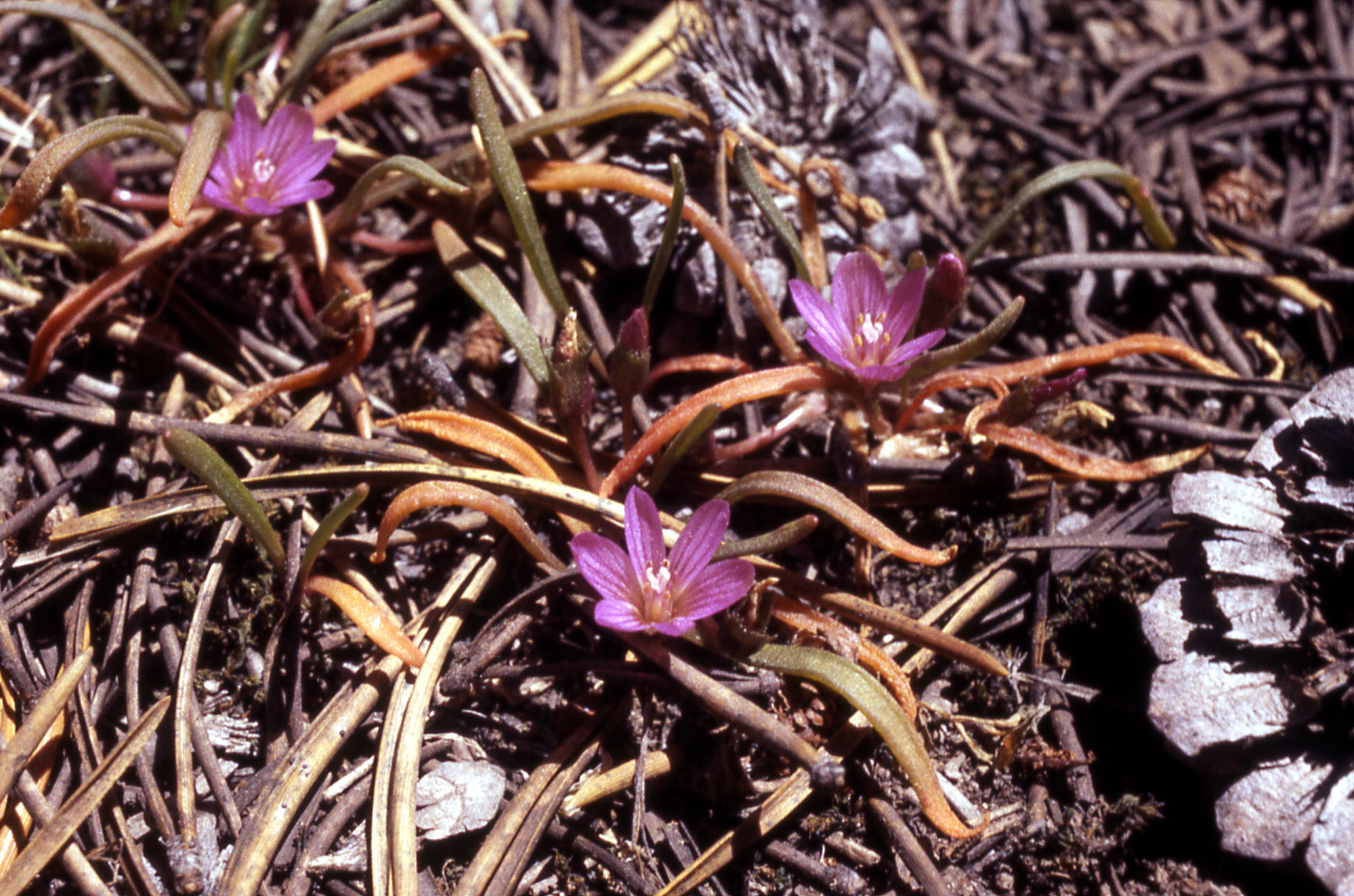

Conservation status
- Secure (NatureServe)

Scientific classification
- Kingdom: Plantae
- Clade: Embryophytes
- Clade: Tracheophytes
- Clade: Spermatophytes
- Clade: Angiosperms
- Clade: Eudicots
- Order: Caryophyllales
- Family: Montiaceae
- Genus: Lewisia
- Species: L. pygmaea

Binomial name
- Lewisia pygmaea (A.Gray) B.L.Rob.

Synonyms
- List: Calandrinia grayi Britton; Calandrinia pygmaea (A.Gray) A.Gray; Claytonia grayi F.Muell.; Claytonia parva Kuntze; Lewisia aridorum (A.Heller) S.Clay; Lewisia exarticulata H.St.John; Lewisia minima A.Nelson; Lewisia sierrae Ferris; Oreobroma aridorum A.Heller; Oreobroma exarticulatum (H.St.John) Rydb.; Oreobroma grayi (Britton) Rydb.; Oreobroma minimum A.Nelson; Oreobroma pygmaeum (A.Gray) Howell; Talinum pygmaeum A.Gray

= Lewisia pygmaea =

Plant species in the springbeauty family

Lewisia pygmaea is a species of flowering plant in the family Montiaceae known by the common name alpine lewisia and pygmy bitterroot. It is native to western North America from Alaska and Alberta to California and New Mexico, where it grows in many types of moist, rocky mountain habitat, such as gravel beds and sandy meadows.

== Description ==
Lewisia pygmaea is a highly variable species with a wide distribution, and it often hybridizes with other Lewisia species, making identification difficult. In general, this is a petite perennial herb growing from a taproot and caudex unit, and producing a basal rosette of several leaves 2 to 8 centimeters (0.8 to 3.1 in) long. The leaves are narrow but thick and fleshy, blunt-tipped, and linear to lance-shaped. The inflorescence is usually made up of a few very short stems each bearing one or more flowers which appear to be sitting on or within the basal leaf rosette. Each flower has 5 to 9 white, pink or red petals which may or may not have dark veining or striping. The petals are 0.4 to 1 centimeter (0.16 to 0.39 in) long.

== Habitat and Range ==
Lewisia pygmaea grows in open areas with short turf and in gravelly or rocky soils. It can be found naturally growing in Alberta, British Columbia, Yukon, Arizona, California, Colorado, Idaho, Montana, Nevada, New Mexico, Oregon, Utah, Washington, and Wyoming.
