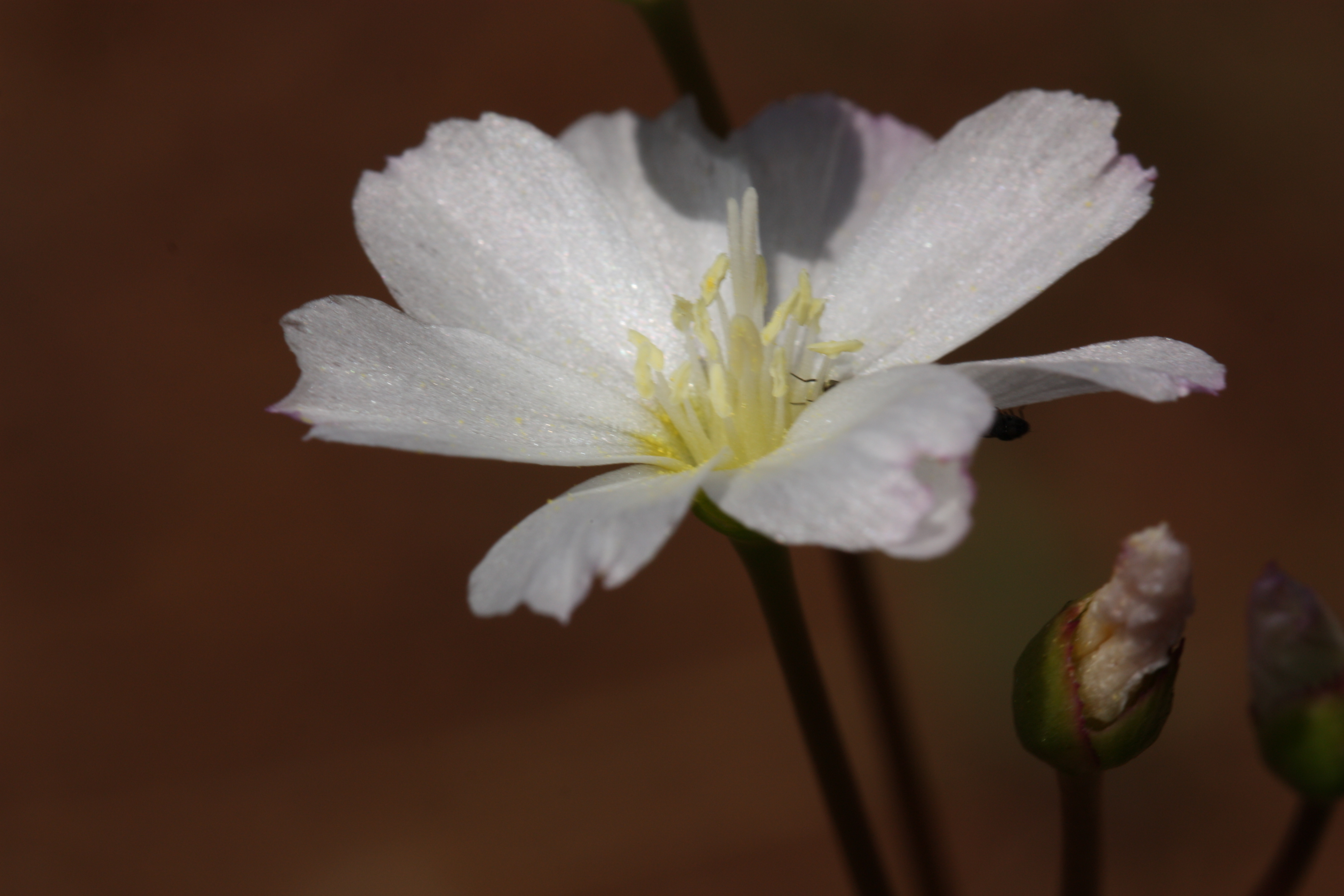

Scientific classification
- Kingdom: Plantae
- Clade: Tracheophytes
- Clade: Angiosperms
- Clade: Eudicots
- Order: Caryophyllales
- Family: Montiaceae
- Genus: Lewisia
- Species: L. oppositifolia

Binomial name
- Lewisia oppositifolia (S.Wats.) B.L.Rob

= Lewisia oppositifolia =

Species of flowering plant

Lewisia oppositifolia is a rare species of flowering plant in the family Montiaceae known by the common name opposite-leaf lewisia. It is native to the Klamath Mountains of Josephine County, Oregon, and Del Norte County, California, where it is a local serpentine endemic generally found in moist areas. This is a perennial herb growing from a small taproot and caudex unit. It produces a basal rosette of several lance-shaped, blunt-tipped fleshy leaves up to 11 centimeters (4.3 in) long. There are sometimes smaller leaves located on the lower stem. The inflorescence is made up of one or more erect stems up to about 20 centimeters (8 in) long, each bearing 1 to 6 flowers. The flower has 8 to 11 white to pale pink petals with blunt or jagged tips, each between 1 and 2 centimeters (0.4 and 0.8 in) long. At the center are several stamens with pale anthers. This plant has a limited distribution and it is threatened by human activity in the area, such as logging.
