= Banner (newspaper) =

Banner is the name of the following newspapers:

- Banner (Toronto newspaper) (1843–1844), Toronto, Ontario, Canada, founded by George Brown
- The Baltimore Banner, Baltimore, Maryland, on-line newspaper, launched in 2022
- Bay State Banner, Boston, Massachusetts, serving the African-American community since 1965
- Bennington Banner, Bennington, Vermont, established in 1841
- Duncan Banner, Duncan, Oklahoma
- Hillsboro Banner, Hillsboro, North Dakota, a weekly newspaper first published in 1879
- Logan Banner, Logan, West Virginia
- The Peel Banner, Brampton, Ontario, Canada, a 19th-century newspaper

== See also ==
- Cambridge Daily Banner, Cambridge, Maryland
- Cleveland Daily Banner, Cleveland, Tennessee
