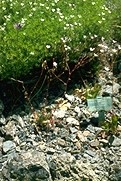

Conservation status
- Critically Imperiled (NatureServe)

Scientific classification
- Kingdom: Plantae
- Clade: Tracheophytes
- Clade: Angiosperms
- Clade: Eudicots
- Order: Caryophyllales
- Family: Montiaceae
- Genus: Lewisia
- Species: L. congdonii

Binomial name
- Lewisia congdonii (Rydb.) S.Clay

= Lewisia congdonii =

Species of flowering plant

Lewisia congdonii, known by the common name Congdon's lewisia, is a rare species of flowering plant in the family Montiaceae.

== Description ==
Lewisia congdonii is a perennial herb growing from a short, thick taproot and caudex unit. It produces a basal rosette of several thick, fleshy leaves with lance-shaped blades tapering down to a long petiole. The inflorescence arises on one or more stems 20 to 60 centimeters (8 to 24 in) tall, each stem bearing an array of up to 100 flowers each. Near the flowers are small, pointed bracts tipped with resin glands. The flower has 6 or 7 petals, each up to about a centimeter in length and lance-shaped with a toothed tip. The petals are pale pink with sharp dark pink veining. The throat is sometimes tinged with greenish yellow.

== Distribution ==
Lewisia congdonii is endemic to the Sierra Nevada of California, where it is known from only ten occurrences in the drainage canyons of the Kings and Merced Rivers.
