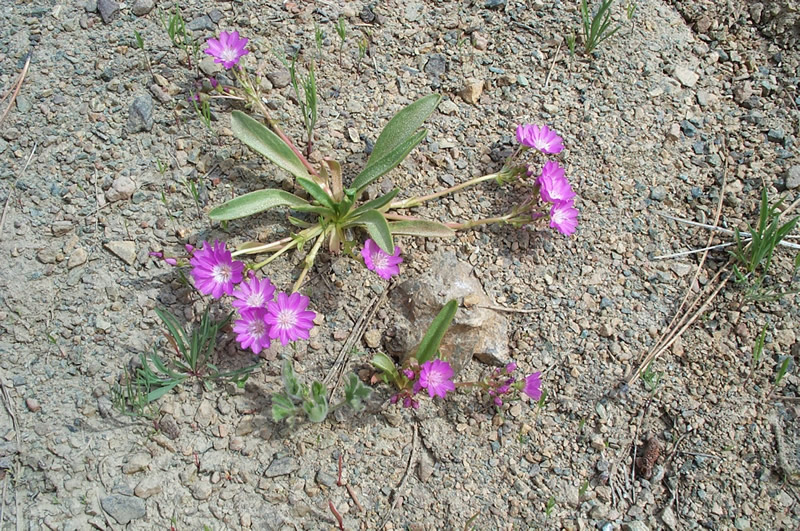

Conservation status
- Critically Imperiled (NatureServe)

Scientific classification
- Kingdom: Plantae
- Clade: Tracheophytes
- Clade: Angiosperms
- Clade: Eudicots
- Order: Caryophyllales
- Family: Montiaceae
- Genus: Lewisia
- Species: L. stebbinsii

Binomial name
- Lewisia stebbinsii Gankin & Hildreth

= Lewisia stebbinsii =

Species of flowering plant

Lewisia stebbinsii is a rare species of flowering plant in the family Montiaceae known by the common name Stebbins' lewisia. It is endemic to California, where it is known from less than fifteen sites in the Inner North Coast Ranges of Mendocino and Trinity Counties, mainly in Mendocino National Forest.

== Description ==
This is a perennial herb growing from a slender taproot and caudex unit. It produces a basal rosette of several fleshy, narrow leaves up to about 9 centimeters (3.5 in) long. The inflorescence is made up of several prostrate stems extending from the rosette, each bearing 3 or more flowers. The flower has 7 to 10 pink to red petals with blunt or jagged tips 1 to 1.5 centimeters (0.4 to 0.6 in) long.
