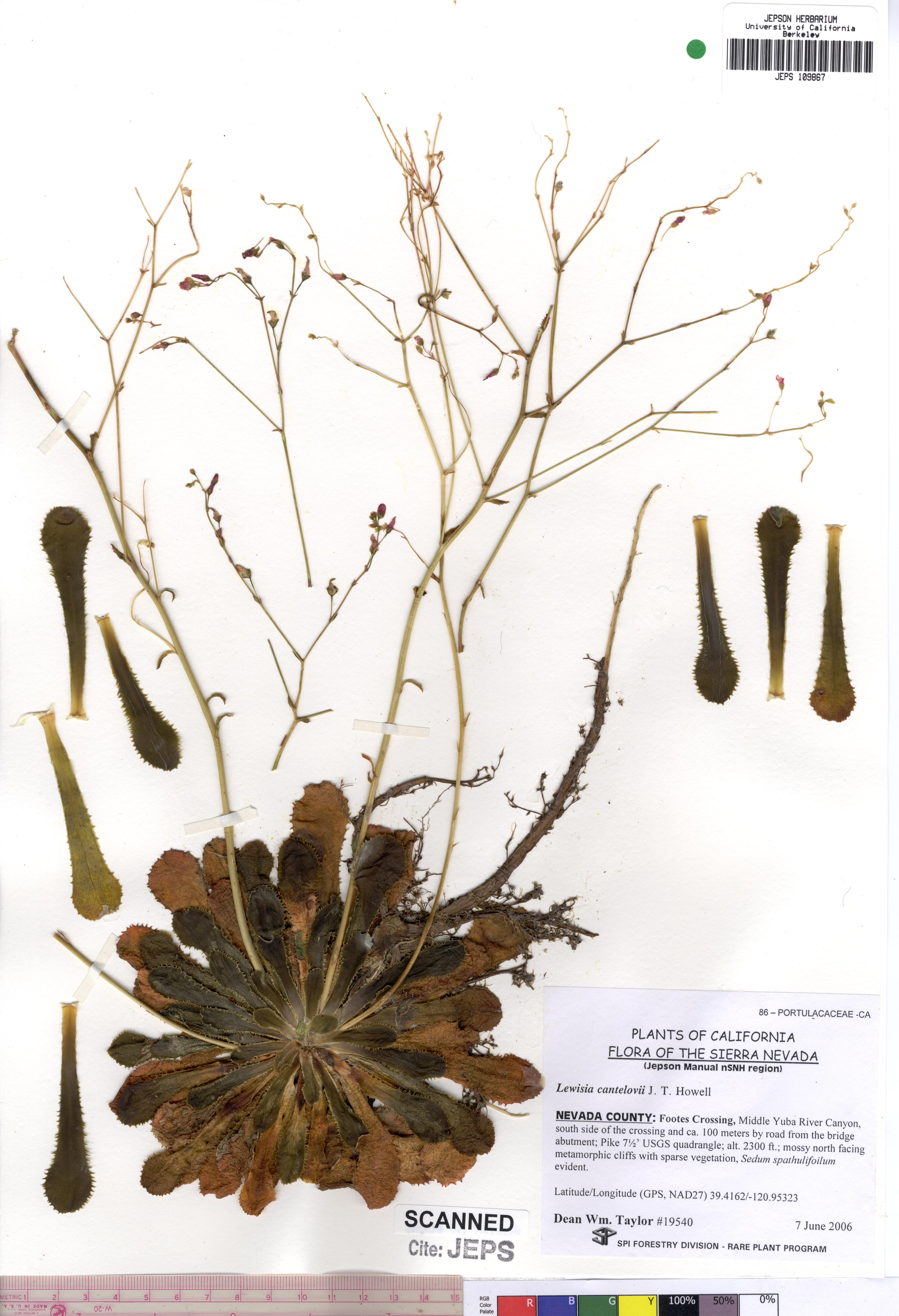

Conservation status
- Vulnerable (NatureServe)

Scientific classification
- Kingdom: Plantae
- Clade: Embryophytes
- Clade: Tracheophytes
- Clade: Spermatophytes
- Clade: Angiosperms
- Clade: Eudicots
- Order: Caryophyllales
- Family: Montiaceae
- Genus: Lewisia
- Species: L. cantelovii

Binomial name
- Lewisia cantelovii J.T.Howell

Synonyms
- Lewisia serrata

= Lewisia cantelovii =

Plant species in the spring beauty family

Lewisia cantelovii is an uncommon species of flowering plant in the spring beauty family known by the common name Cantelow's lewisia. It is native to just the state of California, where it is known from the northeastern mountain ranges from the Klamath Mountains and the northern Sierra Nevada. It grows in rocky, moist mountain habitat. This is a perennial herb growing from a short, thick taproot and caudex unit. It produces a basal rosette of thick, fleshy, blunt-tipped spoon-shaped leaves with serrated edges. The inflorescence is a very slender erect stem up to 45 centimeters (18 in) tall topped with a spreading panicle of flowers and glandular, toothed bracts. Each flower has 5 to 7 oval petals, each 0.5 to 1 centimeter (0.2 to 0.4 in) long. The petals are white or very pale pink with sharp dark pink veins. At the center of the flower are five stamens tipped with dark pink anthers.

== Taxonomy ==
Lewisia cantelovii was scientifically described and named by John Thomas Howell in 1942. He classified the species in the genus Lewisia which is part of the Montiaceae family. It has one heterotypic synonym, Lewisia serrata, which was described by Lawrence Ray Heckard and G. Ledyard Stebbins in 1974.

== Range and habitat ==
Cantelow's lewisia is endemic to the state of California. The Natural Resources Conservation Service (NRCS) records it in Shasta, Plumas, Butte, Sierra, and Nevada counties. It grows in Klamath Mountains and in the Sierra Nevada. In The Jepson Manual it is also listed as growing in the southern Sierra Nevada, but is not recorded in any of the southern California counties by the NRCS. It can be found at elevations of 400 to 1,300 meters (1,300–4,300 ft) and usually on the walls of rocky canyons and ravines that are moist and shady.
