= Howelliella =

Scientific classification
- Kingdom: Plantae
- Clade: Tracheophytes
- Clade: Angiosperms
- Clade: Eudicots
- Clade: Asterids
- Order: Lamiales
- Family: Plantaginaceae
- Genus: Howelliella; Rothm.
- Species: H. ovata

Binomial name
- Howelliella ovata (Eastw.) Rothm.

Synonyms
- Antirrhinum ovatum Eastw.

Genus of flowering plants

Howelliella is a monotypic genus of flowering plants belonging to the family Plantaginaceae. It only contains one species, Howelliella ovata.

It is native to California.

The genus name of Howelliella is in honour of John Thomas Howell (1903–1994), an American botanist and taxonomist, and the Latin specific epithet of ovata refers to ovate, from ovum meaning egg. Both genus and species were first described and published in 1954.
