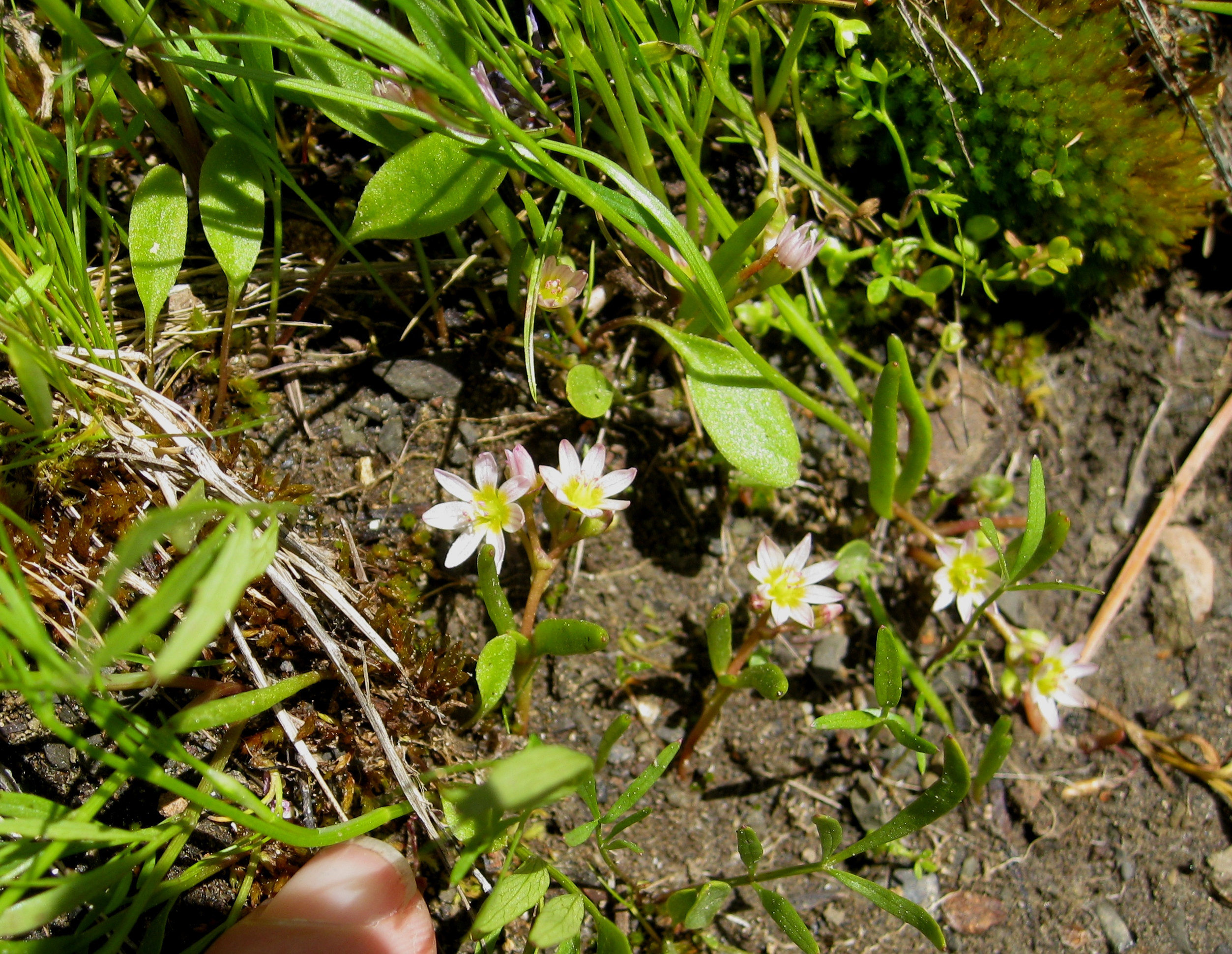

Conservation status
- Apparently Secure (NatureServe)

Scientific classification
- Kingdom: Plantae
- Clade: Embryophytes
- Clade: Tracheophytes
- Clade: Spermatophytes
- Clade: Angiosperms
- Clade: Eudicots
- Order: Caryophyllales
- Family: Montiaceae
- Genus: Erocallis
- Species: E. triphylla

Binomial name
- Erocallis triphylla (S.Watson) Rydb.

Synonyms
- Claytonia triphylla S.Watson; Lewisia triphylla (S.Watson) B.L.Rob.; Oreobroma triphyllum (S.Watson) Howell

= Erocallis =

Plant species in the family

Erocallis triphylla is a species of flowering plant in the family Montiaceae known by the common name threeleaf lewisia. It is the sole species in genus Erocallis.

It is native to western North America from British Columbia to California to Colorado. It grows in mountain and forest habitat, often in wet, rocky alpine areas where it may bloom through the snowmelt. This is a perennial herb growing from a fibrous taproot and corm unit. Instead of a basal rosette like many other Lewisia species it produces 2 to 5 short, slender, fleshy leaves from the lower part of the stem, which may be at or under the soil surface. The small stem bears an inflorescence of 1 to 25 flowers. The flower has 5 to 9 small white or pinkish petals often marked with darker veining or stripes.
