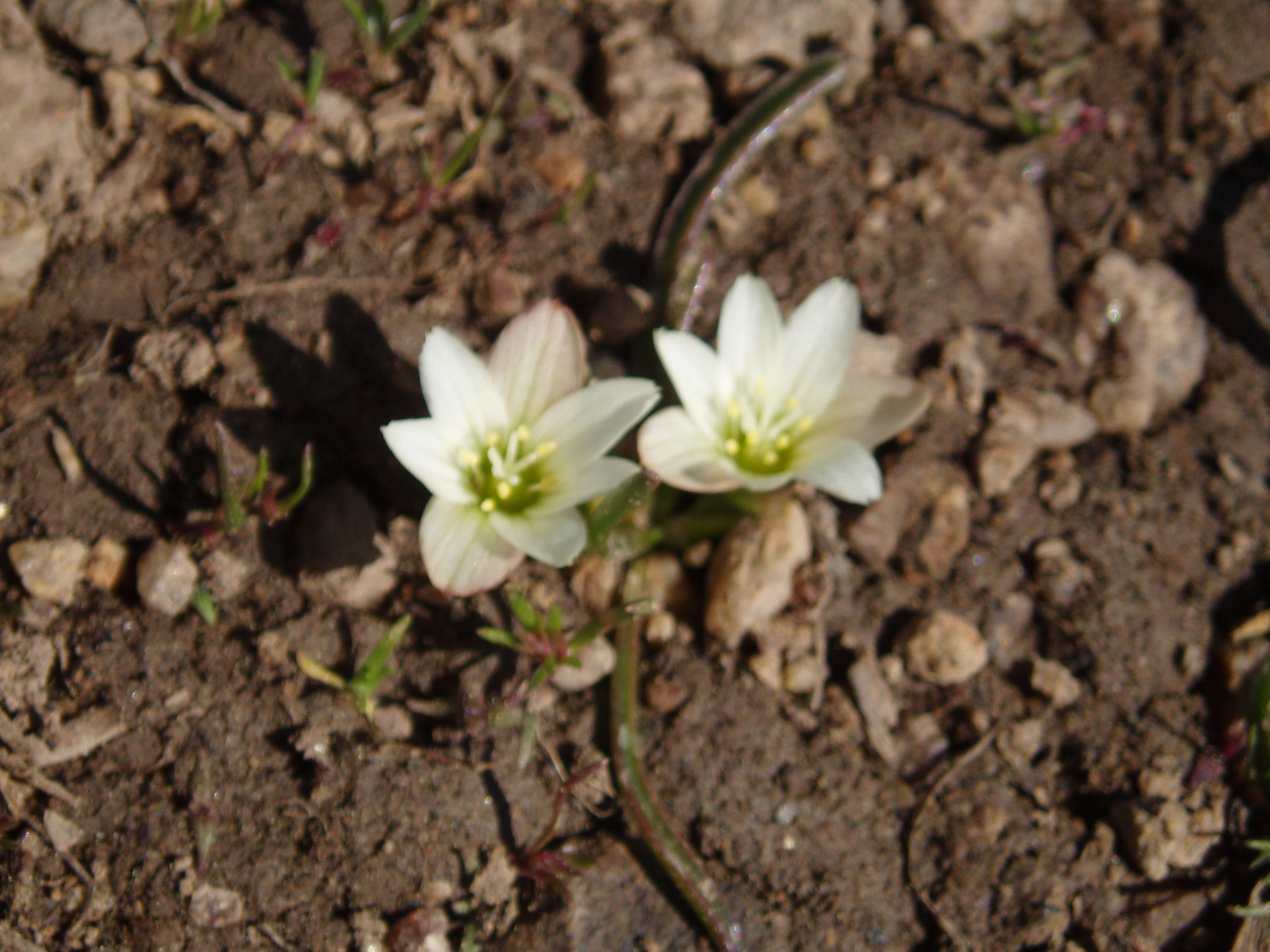

Conservation status
- Apparently Secure (NatureServe)

Scientific classification
- Kingdom: Plantae
- Clade: Tracheophytes
- Clade: Angiosperms
- Clade: Eudicots
- Order: Caryophyllales
- Family: Montiaceae
- Genus: Lewisia
- Species: L. nevadensis

Binomial name
- Lewisia nevadensis (A.Gray) B.L.Rob.

Synonyms
- List: Calandrinia nevadensis A.Gray; Claytonia grayana Kuntze; Lewisia bernardina Davidson; Lewisia pygmaea var. nevadensis (A.Gray) Fosberg; Oreobroma bernardinum (Davidson) Rydb.; Oreobroma nevadense (A.Gray) Howell

= Lewisia nevadensis =

Plant species in the springbeauty family

Lewisia nevadensis is a species of flowering plant in the family Montiaceae known by the common name Nevada lewisia. It is native to much of the western United States, where it grows in moist mountain habitat, such as meadows. This is a small perennial herb growing from a taproot and caudex unit. It produces a basal rosette of several narrow, fingerlike to threadlike fleshy leaves up to 13 centimeters (5.1 in) long. The inflorescence is a bundle of short stems a few centimeters tall each bearing a flower. The flower has 5 to 10 shiny white to pale pink petals each 1 to 2 centimeters (0.4 to 0.8 in) long, pointed or with blunt tips. At the center are many stamens. This is sometimes grown as an ornamental plant suitable for alpine and rock gardens.
