= Wenas Wildlife Area =

Protected area in Washington, United States of America

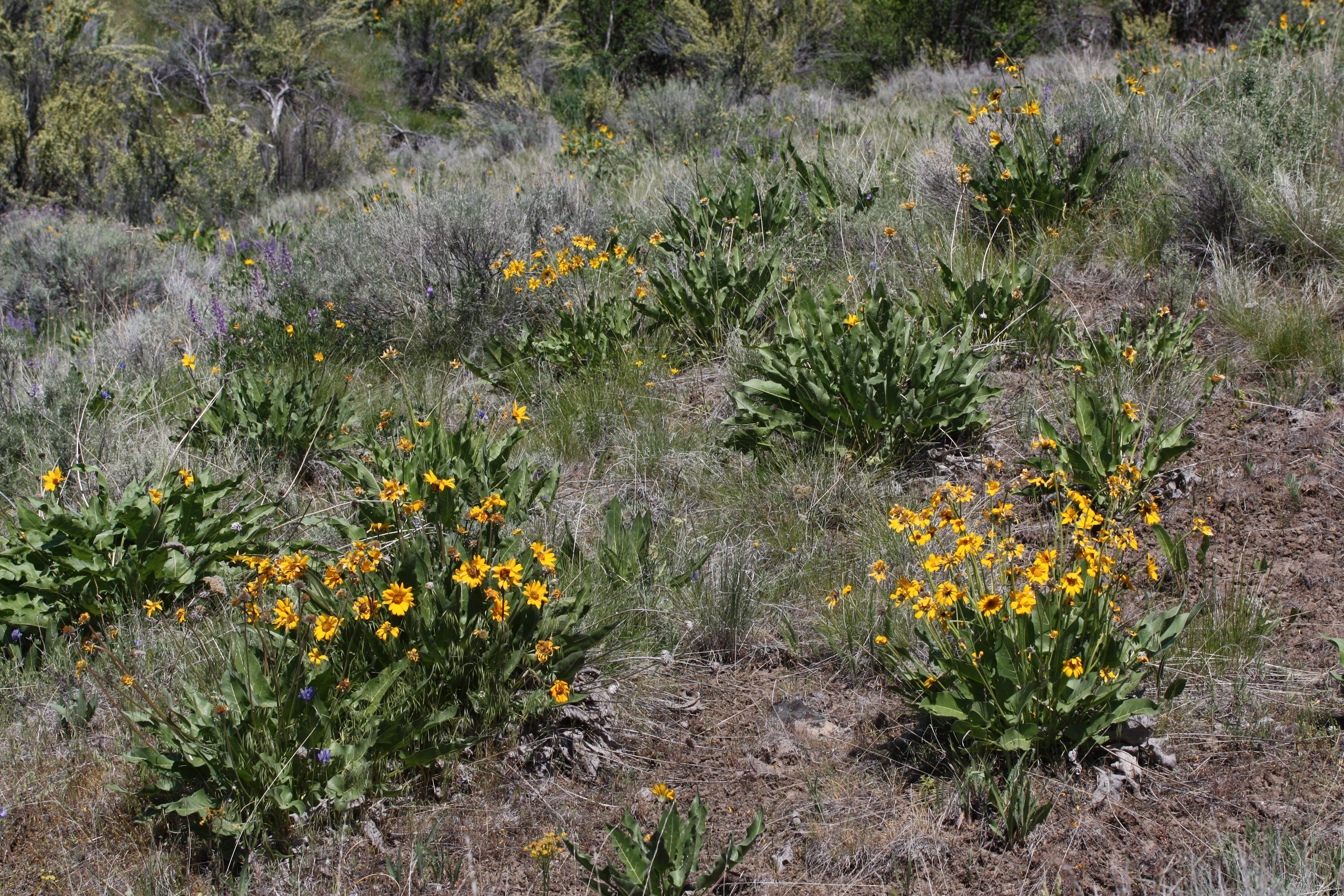
- Balsamorhiza sagittata is a common native wildflower in Wenas Wildlife Area

- Location within Washington (state)
- Coordinates: 46°50′N 120°40′W
- Area: 105,460 acres (426.8 km^{2})
- Max. elevation: 5,173 feet (1,577 m)
- Min. elevation: 1,157 feet (353 m)

Wenas Wildlife Area is a 105,460-acre (42,680 ha) protected area managed by the Washington Department of Fish and Wildlife located in Yakima and Kittitas counties. The property was acquired in the mid-1960s to provide wintering grounds for the Yakima elk herd and is managed with the chief purpose of providing healthy wildlife habitat.
