= Banner Mountain =

Mountain in California, United States

- Location within California

Highest point
- Elevation: 3,902 ft (1,189 m) NAVD 88
- Coordinates: 39°14′44″N 120°57′56″W

Geography
- Location: Nevada County, California, U.S.
- Topo map: USGS Chicago Park

Banner Mountain (also Banner Hill) is in Nevada County near Nevada City in the U.S. state of California. Located on a ridge, its summit is at 3,902 feet (1,189 m). The headwaters of Wolf Creek originate on Banner Mountain; the creek's watershed has been heavily mined.

== Geography ==
Banner Mountain is the headwater source of three main creeks. These are Little Deer Creek, Little Clipper Creek, and Wolf Creek. The terrain is formed of very steep slopes. The watershed formed by the mountain range exhibits a moderate Mediterranean climate with marked variations between the seasons. The winters are wet and cold with temperature in the range of 36–55 °F (2–13 °C). The summers are dry and hot with temperature varying from 75–95 °F (24–35 °C). The annual precipitation reported is about 54 inches (140 cm). During winter the snow precipitation on the mountains is heavy with several feet of snow. A new steel lookout tower of 60 feet (18 m) height replacing a wooden tower, was built on the Banner Mountain in 1926. A lookout house was added in 1931. Both structures have undergone several improvements over the years. in 1971, California's first "Women's Liberation" fire lookout crew was created here as fire watching crew of the U.S. Forest Service. Deer and coyotes are a common sight at this location.

== Geology ==
The watershed formed by the Banner Mountain has many geological formations. The rock types recorded are mafic rocks such as gabbro, serpentine rocks, an ultramafic rocks and granitic rocks consisting of quartz monzonite, and metavolcanic rocks. Consequently, the soil formations of the watershed exhibit soil types derived from gabbro and serpentine. These soils do not permit growth of most plants due to their chemical properties. Species that are tolerant to these conditions only have evolved which are sensitive and mostly endangered. It is a part of the mother lode area which is of historical importance.

== History ==
The mountain slopes of the Banner Mountain was the historical location once known as "The Republic of North California", which was only a farm land of 10 acres. It was situated between the early gold mining towns of Grass Valley and Nevada City. The purpose of this was to create awareness in the official circles of the rights of the people who lived here. It is the philosophy behind this endeavor that created awareness of the peoples; rights even under Free Democratic Republic of the U.S. and to protest "tyranny". The couple who created this awareness were even put behind bars. When they were released they pursued with their dogma and successfully lived in their farm which they had called a Republic. They lived there for 40 years and developed many agricultural practices which made them self-sufficient to sustain. They, Val and Lilly Belle, even got the honor in the Nevada County Fair's Hall of Fame, in 1990. A book title "California Characters, an Array of Amazing People" by Charles Hillinger published in 1994 includes their story.
