= The Peel Banner =

The Peel Banner is a newspaper that was published out of the village of Brampton, Ontario. Released on Thursdays, the paper was the local voice for the Reform movement. Its local competition was The Brampton Times, also Reform, and The Conservator, which would eventually take a conservative perspective.

Alexander Dick was the editor and publisher from at least 1878 to 1882.

According to Pettengill's newspaper directory and advertiser's handbook for 1878, the publication had circulation of 1,008, versus the Times′ 1,100.

As of 1881, the Banner was the largest publication, 8 pages compared to 4 pages from either competitor. Subscriptions were up to 1,056. As of 1882, subscriptions were $1 per month, fifty cents cheaper than the competitors. By 1885, the publication reached 1220 subscribers.
