= Billy Banner =

English footballer

Personal information
- Full name: William Henry Banner
- Date of birth: 1878
- Place of birth: Barnsley, England
- Date of death: 1936 (aged 57–58)
- Position: Centre half

Senior career*
Years	Team	Apps	(Gls)
1898–1899	Poolsbrook United		
1899–1900	Dronfield Town		
1900–1901	New Whittington Exchange		
1901–1903	Chesterfield Town	52	(4)
1903–1904	Queens Park Rangers		
1904–1908	Chesterfield Town	129	(8)
1908–1909	Hardwick Colliery		
1909–1910	Denaby United		
1910	Hardwick Colliery		
Total		181	(12)
- * Club domestic league appearances and goals

William Henry Banner (1878–1936) was an English footballer who played in the Football League for Chesterfield Town.
