= Banner (strawberry) =

Variety of fruit

Fragaria 'Banner'
- Marketing names: Sweet Briar
- Breeder: Thomas J. Loftus
- Origin: Redding, California

Banner (originally called Sweet Briar) was a variety of strawberry that grew in the northwestern United States in the early 1900s. The variety was originally named "Sweet Briar" by Thomas J. Loftus, who discovered the berry on his ranch just north of Redding, California.

The variety was later developed by J.E. "Ed" Reiter and Reiter's brother-in-law, R.F. "Dick" Driscoll, who marketed them under the Banner Berry Farm's Brand (later known as Driscoll's). The name "Banner" came from the way the strawberries were packaged and sold in the San Francisco market. They were packed in crates and wrapped in paper ribbon. This marketing strategy earned the strawberry variety the name "Banner" due to the large strawberry printed on the banner of each crate.

The Banner variety was infected by the spread of a viral infection after 20 years of production.

== See also ==
- List of strawberry cultivars
- List of strawberry topics
- Strawberry mild yellow-edge virus
