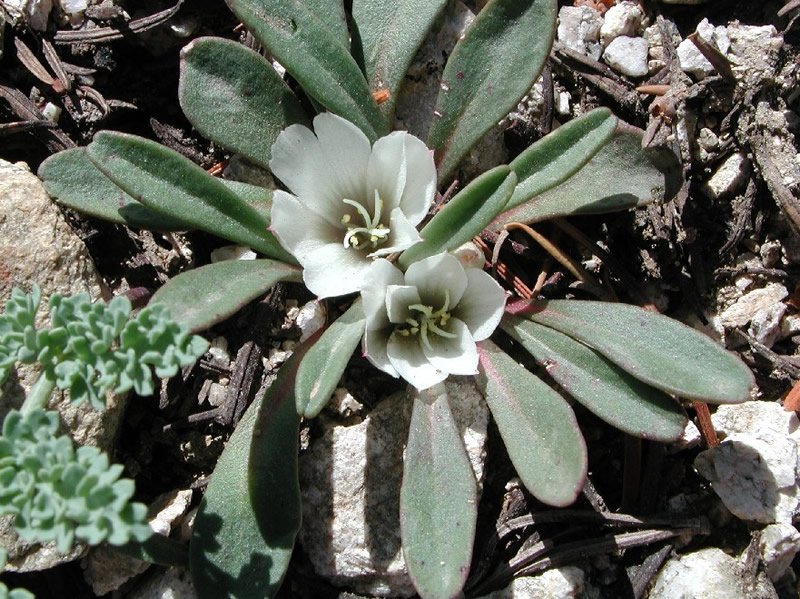

Conservation status
- Imperiled (NatureServe)

Scientific classification
- Kingdom: Plantae
- Clade: Tracheophytes
- Clade: Angiosperms
- Clade: Eudicots
- Order: Caryophyllales
- Family: Montiaceae
- Genus: Lewisia
- Species: L. sacajaweana

Binomial name
- Lewisia sacajaweana B.L.Wilson

= Lewisia sacajaweana =

Species of flowering plant

Lewisia sacajaweana is a species of flowering plant in the family Montiaceae known by the common name Sacajawea's bitterroot. It is endemic to Idaho, where it is known from approximately two dozen sites, with about 75 percent of them in Boise National Forest. It is usually found at elevations ranging from 5,000 feet (1,500 m) to 9,500 feet (2,900 m) above sea level and produces white flowers shortly after snowmelt.

The species is named in honor of Sacagawea, Native American guide to the Lewis and Clark Expedition. It is part of a genus named for Meriwether Lewis of the same expedition.
