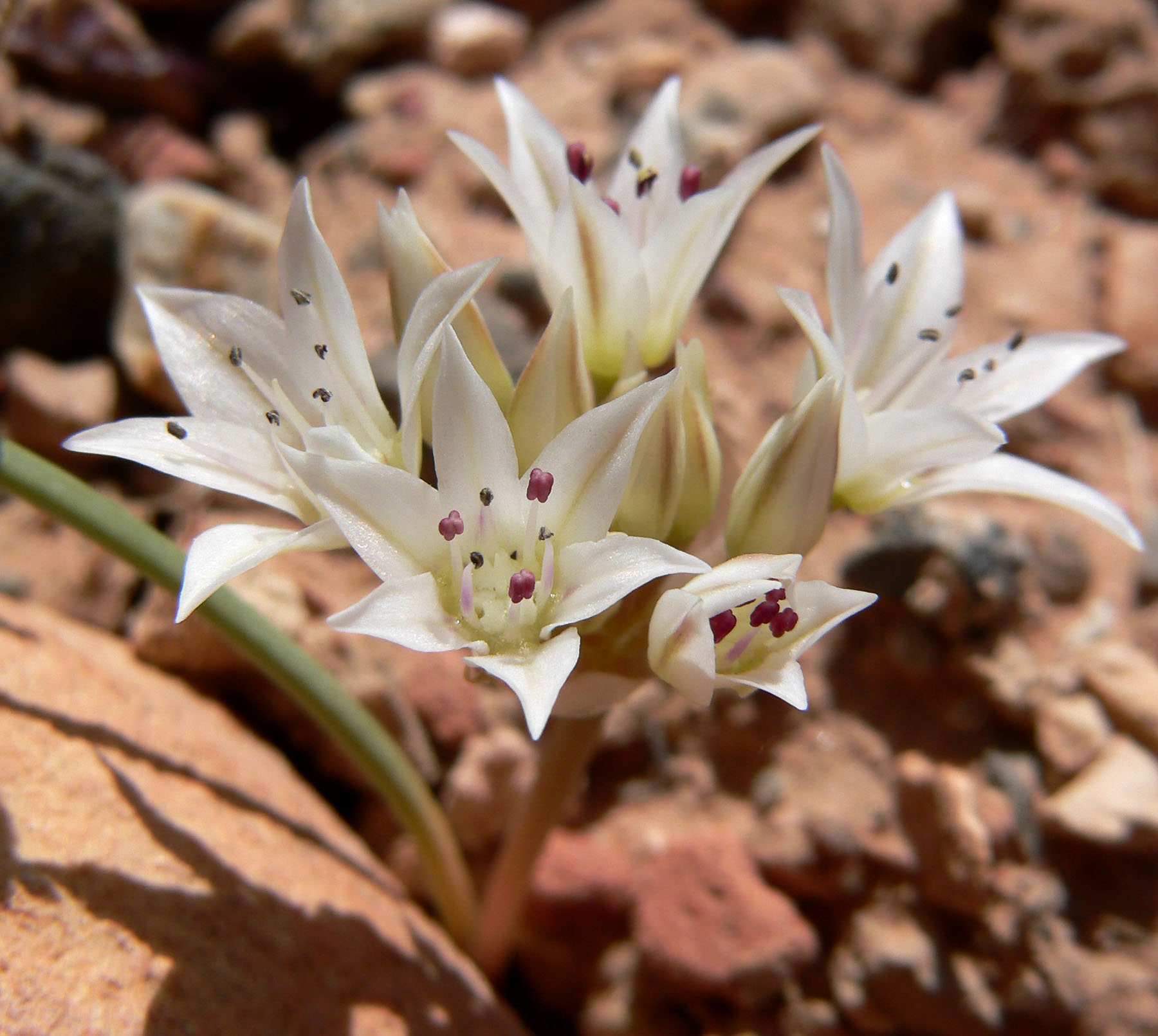

Conservation status
- Apparently Secure (NatureServe)

Scientific classification
- Kingdom: Plantae
- Clade: Tracheophytes
- Clade: Angiosperms
- Clade: Monocots
- Order: Asparagales
- Family: Amaryllidaceae
- Subfamily: Allioideae
- Genus: Allium
- Species: A. nevadense

Binomial name
- Allium nevadense S.Wats.

Synonyms
- Allium nevadense var. macropetalum M. Peck

= Allium nevadense =

Nevada onion

Species of flowering plant

Allium nevadense is a species of wild onion known by the common name Nevada onion. It is native to the western United States where it grows in sand and rocky soil at elevations of 1400–1700 m. The species is widespread in Utah, Nevada and southern Idaho, and has been reported also from southeastern California (Inyo and San Bernardino Counties), northwestern Arizona (Mohave and Cochise Counties), western and central Colorado (Moffat, Garfield, Mesa and Boulder Counties) and eastern Oregon (Harney and Malheur Counties).

The Nevada onion grows from a brown or gray bulb one to one and a half centimeters wide which may have one or two daughter bulblets associated with it. The stem may appear short if the bulb is more than a few inches below the surface of the ground. The stem is topped with an umbel of up to 25 flowers. The tepals may be white or pink-streaked with darker midveins; anthers purple; pollen yellow.
