= USS Banner =

Two ships of the United States Navy have been named Banner, after Banner County, Nebraska.

- USS Banner (APA-60)
- USS Banner (AKL-25)
