= Al-Banna =

al-Banna is an Arabic family name, it translates to “The Mason”:

- ibn al-Banna' al-Marrakushi, Arab mathematician and astronomer
- Mahmud Ali al-Banna (1926–1985), Egyptian Quran reciter
- Hassan al-Banna, founder of the Muslim Brotherhood
- Gamal al-Banna, liberal Islamic scholar, brother of Hassan al-Banna
- Abu Nidal, born Sabri Khalil al-Banna, Palestinian political leader, mercenary, and the founder of Fatah — the Revolutionary Council (Fatah al-Majles al-Thawry), more commonly known as the Abu Nidal Organization (ANO)
- Jamil el-Banna, Jordanian with refugee status in the UK who had been held in Guantanamo Bay
