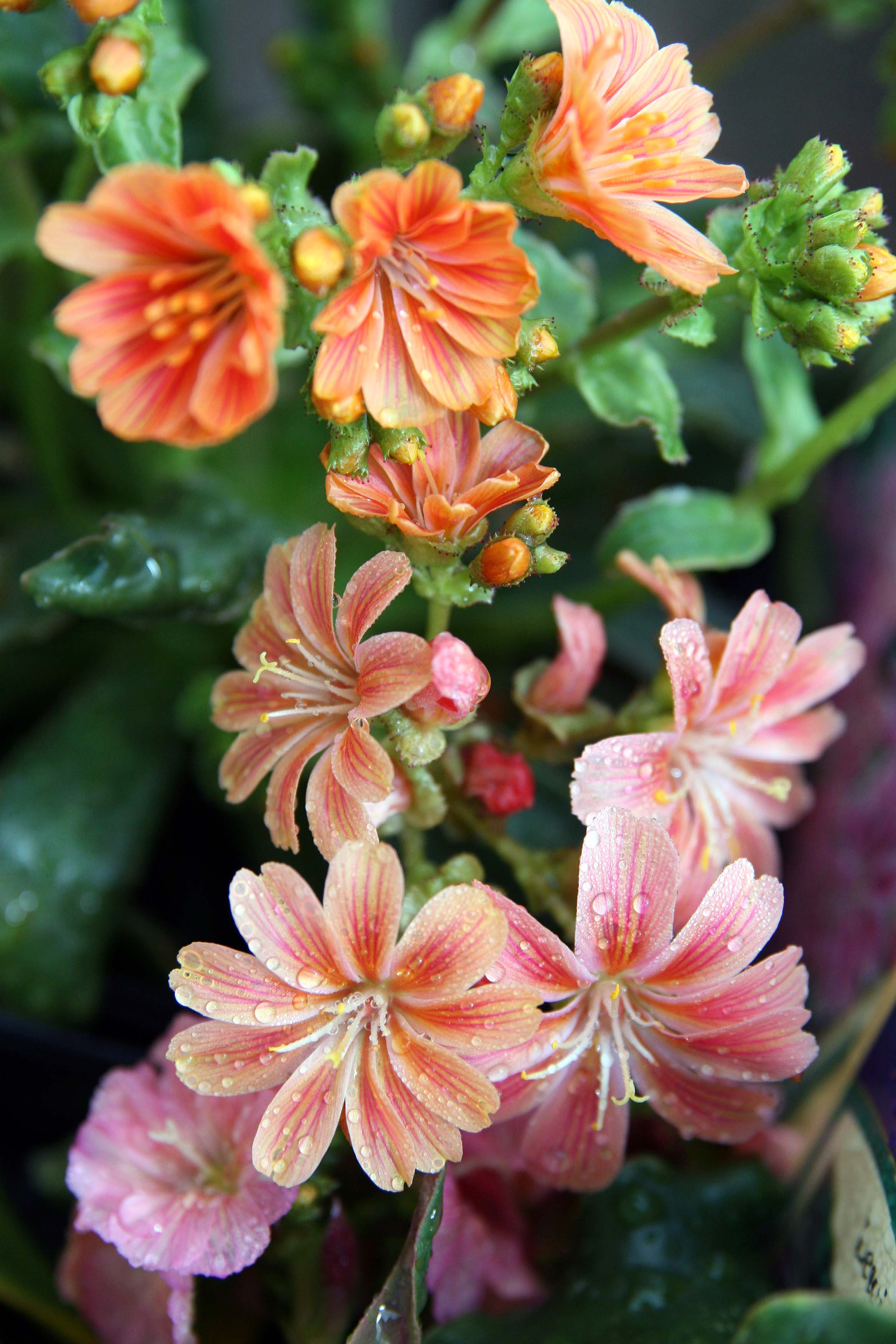
- Lewisia cotyledon 'Sunset Strain'

Scientific classification
- Kingdom: Plantae
- Clade: Tracheophytes
- Clade: Angiosperms
- Clade: Eudicots
- Order: Caryophyllales
- Family: Montiaceae
- Genus: Lewisia
- Species: L. cotyledon

Binomial name
- Lewisia cotyledon (S.Wats.) B.L.Rob.

= Lewisia cotyledon =

Species of flowering plant

Lewisia cotyledon is a species of flowering plant in the family Montiaceae known by the common names Siskiyou lewisia and cliff maids. It is native to southern Oregon and northern California, where it grows in rocky subalpine mountain habitat.

== Description ==
It is an evergreen perennial growing from a thick taproot and caudex unit. It produces a basal rosette of many thick, fleshy oval- or spoon-shaped leaves up to 9 cm (4 in) long.

The specific epithet cotyledon ("small cup") refers to the shape of the leaves.

Flowering from spring to summer, the inflorescence arises on one or more stems 10–30 cm (4–12 in) tall, each stem bearing an array of up to 50 flowers.

Near the flowers are small, pointed bracts tipped with resin glands. The flower has 7 to 13 petals, each about 1.5 centimeters long. The petals may be pale pink with darker veining, whitish with pinkish orange striping, or solid orange to yellow.

== Award ==
This plant and the Sunset group of cultivars have gained the Royal Horticultural Society's Award of Garden Merit. It is hardy down to −10 °C (14 °F), and prefers a shaded position in acidic or neutral soil.
