= John Thomas Howell =

American botanist (1903–1994)

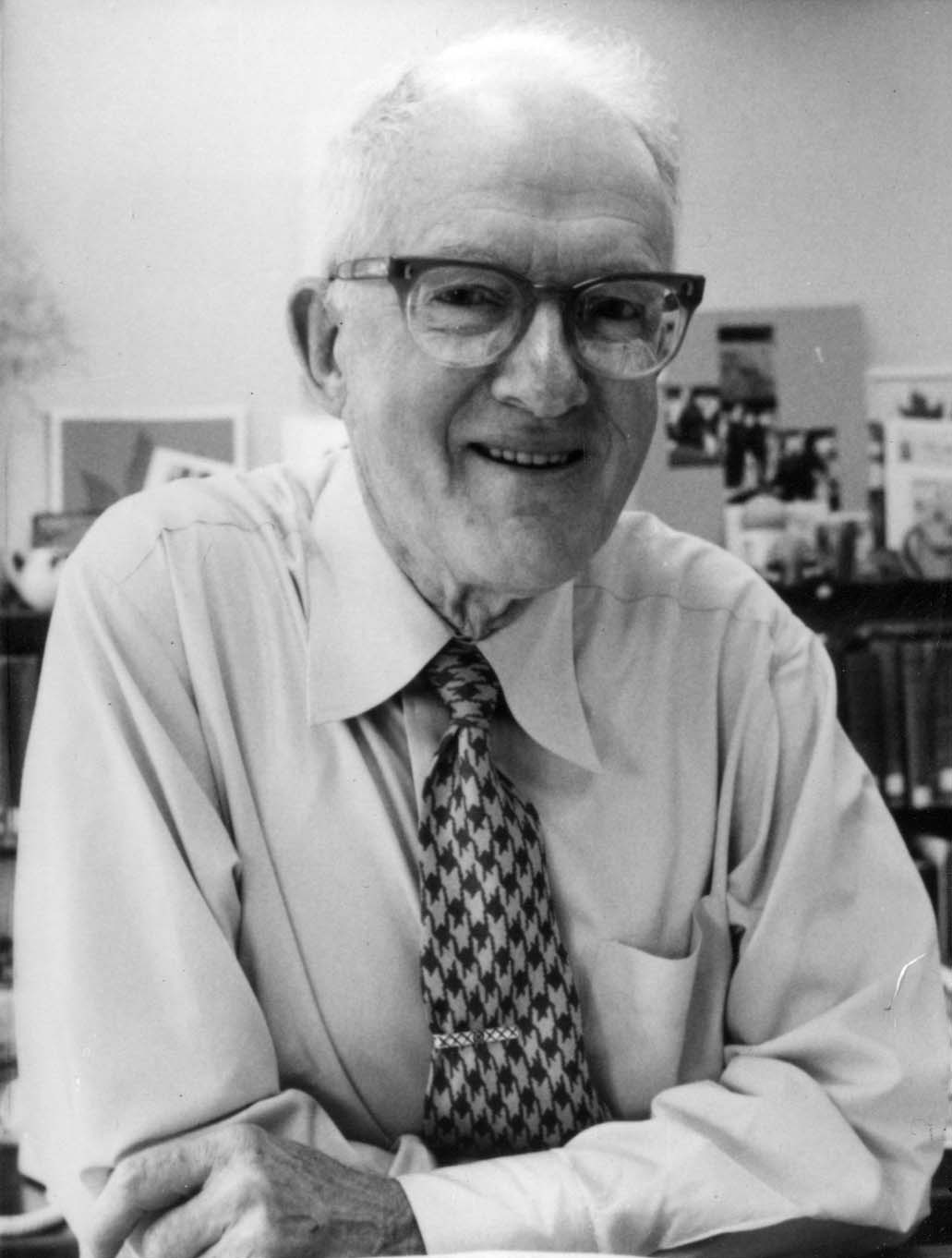
- Scientific career
- Fields: Botany
- Workplaces: California Academy of Sciences

John Thomas Howell (November 6, 1903 – May 7, 1994) was an American botanist and taxonomist. He became an expert of Eriogonum (buckwheat) species, which are widely represented in the native California flora.

He was the assistant of Alice Eastwood (1859−1953), the renowned botanist and botanical collection director at the California Academy of Sciences in San Francisco, California.

== Taxa named for Howell ==
The genera of Howelliella (in the family Plantaginaceae), Howellanthus (a synonym of Phacelia in the Boraginaceae family) and also Johanneshowellia (Howell's buckwheat) of the family Polygonaceae, are all named in his honor.

== See also ==
- List of California native plants
- Flora of California
