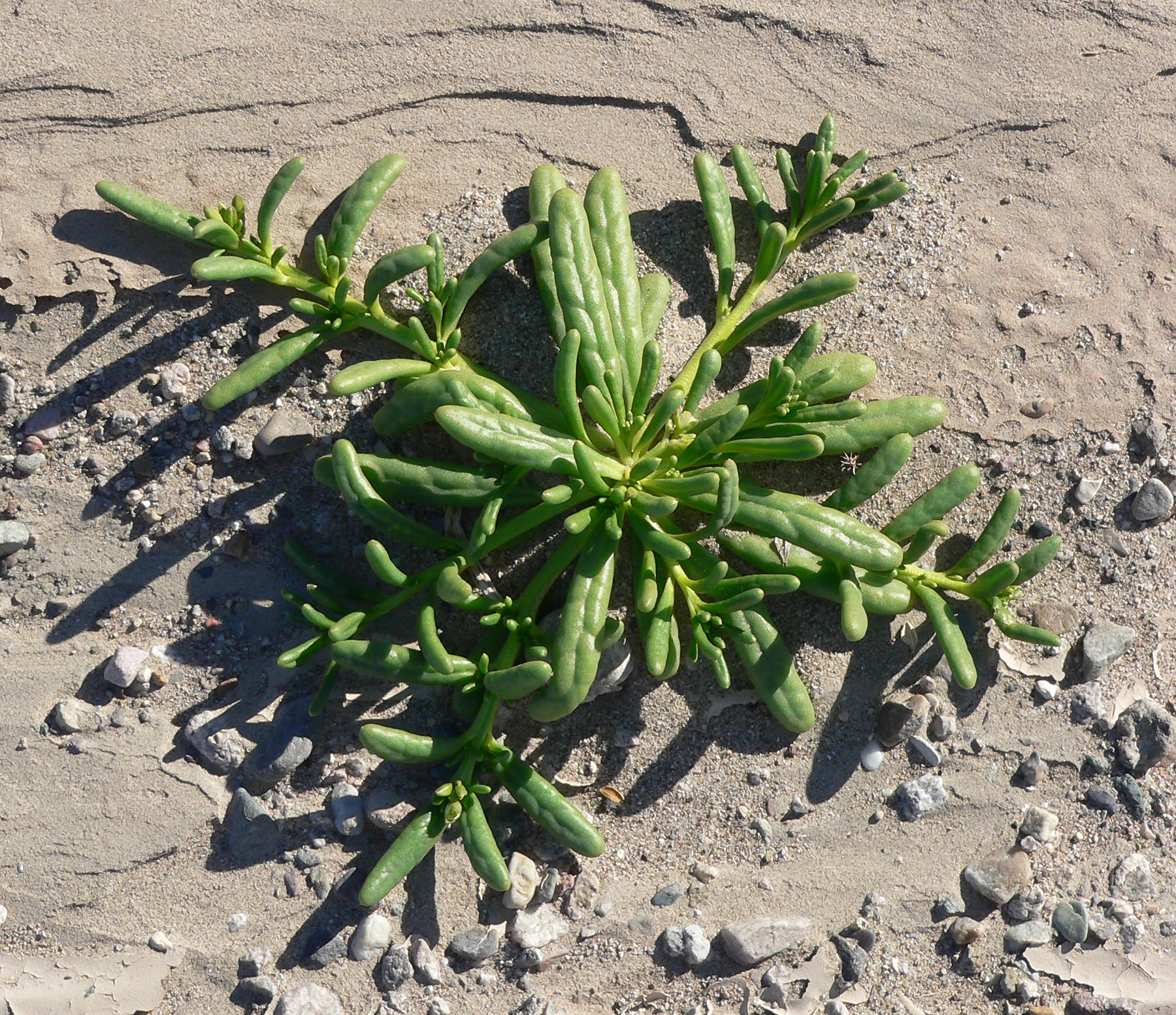

Scientific classification
- Kingdom: Plantae
- Clade: Tracheophytes
- Clade: Angiosperms
- Clade: Eudicots
- Order: Caryophyllales
- Family: Montiaceae
- Genus: Thingia; Hershk.
- Species: T. ambigua

Binomial name
- Thingia ambigua (S.Watson) Hershk.

Synonyms
- Species synonymy: Calandrinia ambigua (S.Watson) Howell; Cistanthe ambigua (S.Watson) Carolin ex Hershk.; Claytonia ambigua S.Watson; Calandrinia sesuvioides A.Gray

= Thingia =

Genus of flowering plants

Thingia is a monospecific genus of flowering plant in the family Montiaceae comprised only by the species Thingia ambigua, known as desert pussypaws. It is native to northwestern Mexico, California, and Arizona, and is found commonly on sandy or silty soil. The sole species of the genus has been housed under several genera before it was split into Thingia: Claytonia in 1882, Calandrinia in 1893, and Cistanthe in 1990. DNA evidence demonstrated that the relationship of Thingia ambigua, then Cistanthe ambigua, to the next closest relative in Cistanthe, C. tweedyi, was actually disjointed. It was found that the two species were most closely related to completely separate South American taxa.

== Description ==
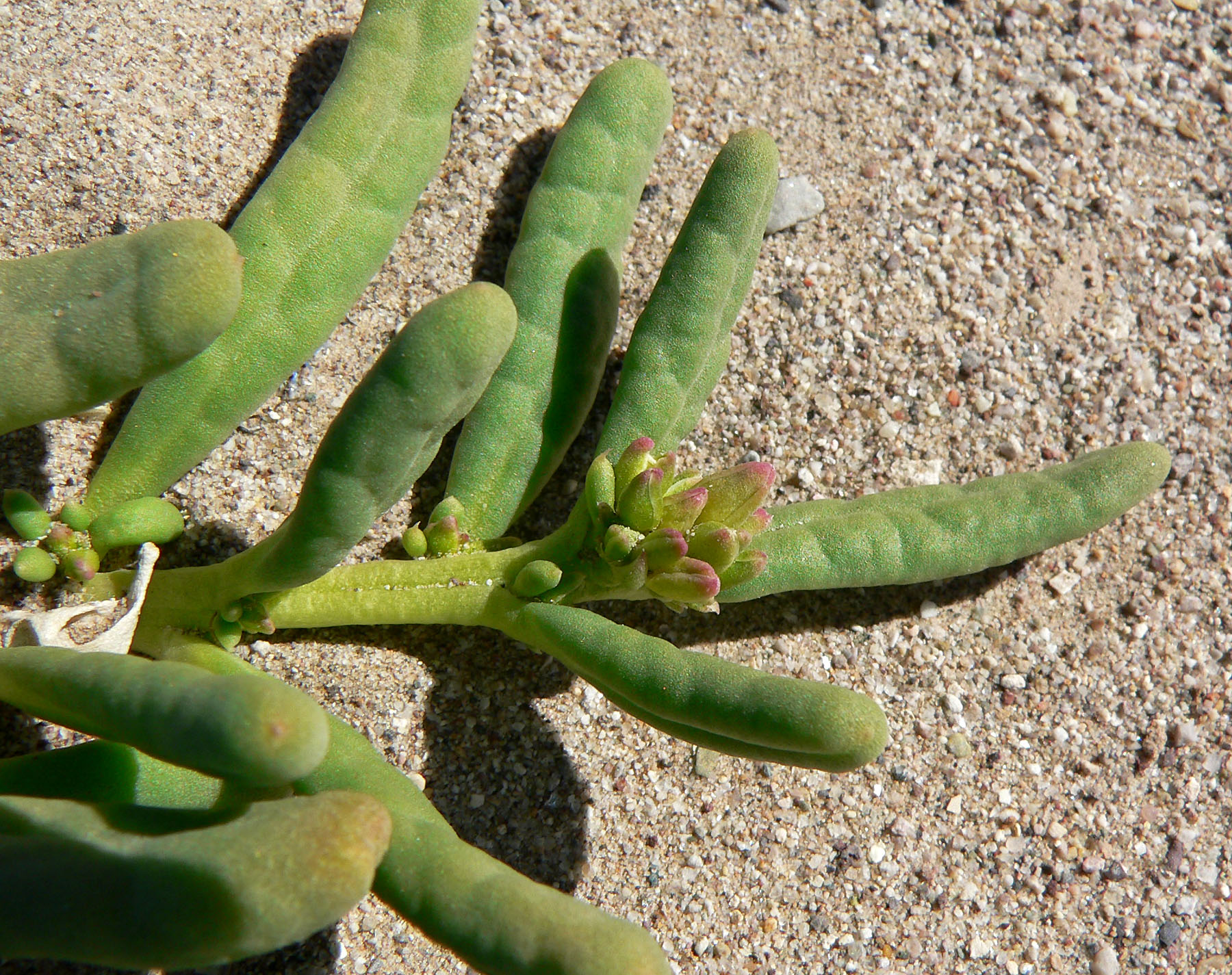
The budding inflorescence of T. ambigua

Thingia ambigua is an annual plant with fleshy roots. It has stems 3–18 centimetres (1.2–7.1 in) long that grow outwards and upright. Its leaves are narrow and clasp the stem at their base; each leaf blade is 1.5–6 centimetres (0.6–2.4 in) long. It has dense clusters of flowers, each with 3–5 white petals. They have 5–10 stamens with a yellow-colored anther and three stigmas with a pedicel that is 0.1–0.3 centimetres (0.04–0.12 in) long. The seeds are oval-shaped and black in color. The species flowers from November to February.

The genus has several distinctive characteristics that differentiate it from closely related taxa. It has three carpels, instead of the two possessed by species of Calyptridium and Philippiamra. While species of Lenzia also have three carpels, their foliage differs from that of Thingia. Plants of Thingia have leafy stems and complex flower structures, whereas those in Lenzia have almost no visible stems and only solitary flowers. Another difference is in the veins of the leaves: Thingia has a three-dimensional vein arrangement, where the veins of the other genera are arranged in a two-dimensional pattern.
