= Schreiteria =

Schreiteria is the scientific name of two genera of organisms and may refer to:

- Schreiteria (beetle), a genus of insects in the family Cerambycidae
- Schreiteria (plant), a genus of plants in the family Montiaceae
