= Silvaea =

Silvaea can refer to:

- Silvaea Hook. & Arn. ex Baill., a synonym of Trigonostemon Blume
- Silvaea Meisn., a synonym of Mezilaurus Kuntze ex Taub.
- Silvaea Phil., a synonym of Philippiamra Kuntze
