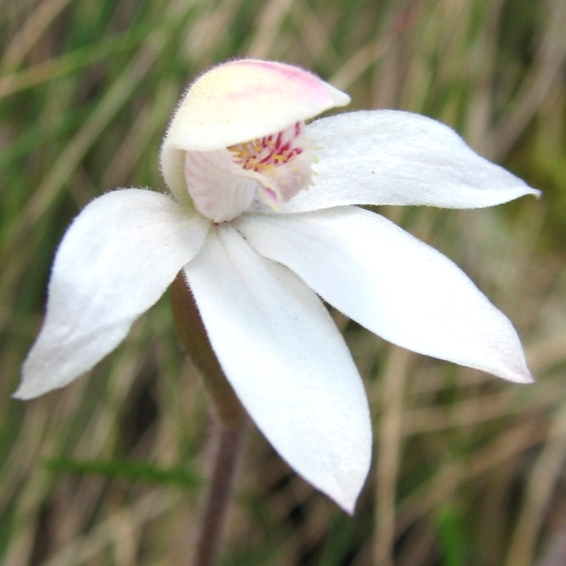
- In Mount Buffalo National Park

Scientific classification
- Kingdom: Plantae
- Clade: Tracheophytes
- Clade: Angiosperms
- Clade: Monocots
- Order: Asparagales
- Family: Orchidaceae
- Subfamily: Orchidoideae
- Tribe: Diurideae
- Genus: Caladenia
- Species: C. alpina

Binomial name
- Caladenia alpina R.S.Rogers

Synonyms
- Stegostyla alpina (R.S.Rogers) D.L.Jones & M.A.Clem.

= Caladenia alpina =

Mountain caladenia

Species of orchid

Caladenia alpina, commonly known as mountain caladenia, is a species of plant in the orchid family Orchidaceae and is native to subalpine areas of south-eastern Australia and to New Zealand. It has a single fleshy leaf and a thin wiry flowering spike bearing two white flowers with red bars on the labellum. In New Zealand this orchid is sometimes known as Caladenia lyallii.

== Description ==
Caladenia alpina is a terrestrial, perennial, deciduous, herb with an underground tuber and a single, sparsely hairy, lance-shaped leaf, 9–28 cm (4–10 in) long and 5–8 mm (0.2–0.3 in) wide. The leaf is thick and fleshy and green to dark reddish-green.

One to three flowers, usually two, are borne on a spike up to 30 cm (10 in) high and are about 40 mm (2 in) in diameter. The dorsal sepal is a broad egg shape 4–8 mm (0.2–0.3 in) wide and curves forward to form a hood over the column. The petals and lateral sepals are broad, 12–20 mm (0.5–0.8 in) long and are white and glabrous on the front and pinkish red to maroon with glandular hairs on the back. The labellum is about 9 mm (0.4 in) long when flattened, white with dark red to purple spots and lines with a wavy margin, a few short teeth and a pointed tip. There are four well-spaced rows of calli on the surface of the labellum. The calli are club-shaped, yellow or whitish becoming darker and shorter towards the tip of the labellum. The column is about 7 mm (0.3 in) long with broad wings and has red spots or streaks.

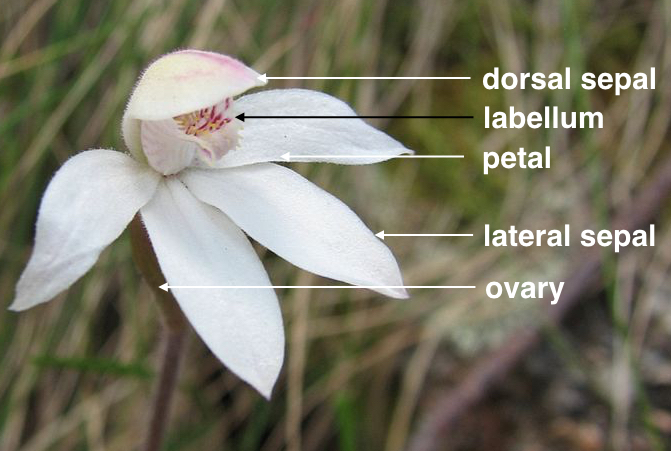
Caladenia alpina - labelled image

== Taxonomy and naming ==
Caladenia alpina was first formally described by Richard Sanders Rogers in 1927 and the description was published in Transactions and Proceedings of the Royal Society of South Australia. Rogers described the species from specimens collected on Mount Bogong and Mount Hotham in Victoria and from Mount Kosciuszko in New South Wales. The specific epithet (alpina) is a Latin word meaning "of high mountains".

In New Zealand the species is known as Caladenia lyallii although some orchidologists suggest that both C. lyallii and C. alpina occur in that country. The epithet (lyallii) honours the Scottish botanist David Lyall, who was a friend of Joseph Hooker. Caladenia alpina is regarded as a synonym of Caladenia lyallii by the Royal Botanic Gardens, Kew. Caladenia lyallii was first formally described by Joseph Dalton Hooker in Flora Novae-Zelandiae.

== Distribution and habitat ==
Mountain caladenia usually grows in subalpine zones above 1,000 m (3,000 ft) in forest, snow gum woodland and herbfields or near ponds and bogs. In New South Wales it occurs on the Southern Tablelands south of the Brindabella Range and in Victoria on the Great Dividing Range and Grampians. In New Zealand, Caladenia lyallii occurs on both the North and South Islands as well as on Stewart Island.
