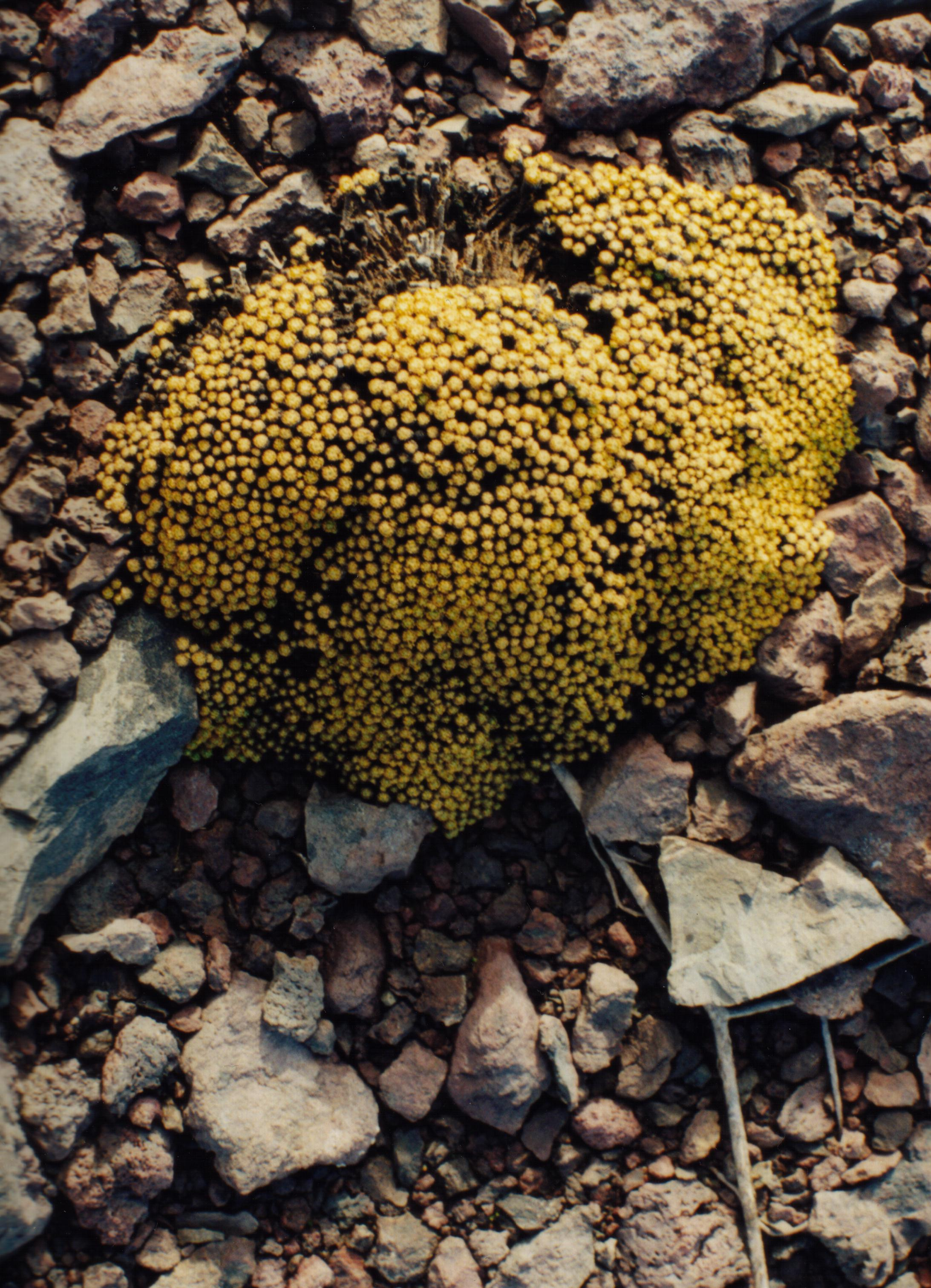
- Lyallia Cushion

Scientific classification
- Kingdom: Plantae
- Clade: Tracheophytes
- Clade: Angiosperms
- Clade: Eudicots
- Order: Caryophyllales
- Family: Montiaceae
- Genus: Lyallia; Hook.f.
- Species: L. kerguelensis

Binomial name
- Lyallia kerguelensis Hook.f.

= Lyallia =

Flowering plant genus in the montia family

Lyallia kerguelensis is a species of flowering cushion plant in the monotypic genus Lyallia of the family Montiaceae.

== Description ==
Lyallia kerguelensis is a perennial that forms round cushions, usually 20–40 centimeters across, but occasionally up to 1 meter in diameter. Individual cushions have a mean diameter of 12.79 cm and mean height of 6.06 cm. The plants have an extensive root system with a large main root and many fine branching roots. Plants can live for at least 16 years.

The flowers are tiny and mostly green. They are found are at the ends of the stems in the leaf axils, where the leaves attach to the stems, usually in clusters of two to four. Each flower has two somewhat green membrane-like sepals that fuse at the base. The four petals have a similar texture. Each flower has three stamens, but about one third of fully opened flowers only have two functional anthers.

Each translucent red-brown capsule has one or two kidney shaped black seeds. Unlike most plants endemic to the islands in the south Indian Ocean, its seeds are not highly viable.

== Taxonomy ==
Both the genus Lyallia and the species Lyallia kerguelensis were scientifically described and named by Joseph Dalton Hooker with priority dated to 1847. Lyallia is classified in the family Montiaceae, although it was formerly placed in the Portulacaceae and before that in Hectorellaceae.

Lyallia kerguelensis is the only accepted species in the genus, however one species was previously placed in it. Reicheella andicola was initially described as Lyallia andicola by Rodolfo Amando Philippi in 1891 but was reclassified in 1900. Additionally, it was proposed by B.L. Nyananyo and Vernon Heywood that Hectorella caespitosa be moved to the genus as Lyallia caespitosa in 1987. It is a similar cushion plant from alpine areas that is endemic of the South Island of New Zealand. Genetic research has confirmed that H. caespitosa is the closest relative to Lyallia, but the move to Lyallia has not been widely accepted in the field of botany.

=== Name ===
The generic name honors British botanist and naval officer David Lyall who collected specimens of the plant. Lyall served as assistant surgeon on HMS Terror on the Antarctic exploring expedition led by James Clark Ross from 1839 to 1843. Hooker also served as an assistant surgeon on the expedition, but aboard HMS Erebus.

== Range and habitat ==
The species is endemic to the Kerguelen Islands in the subantarctic, part of the French Southern and Antarctic Lands in the southern Indian Ocean. It grows in small populations on moraines and fellfields, from the sea shore to about 300 meters above sea level, at a mean elevation of 132.22 m. It is present, but rare on the main island of the group, but is more common on Long Island in the Gulf of Morbihan.

Both Lyallia kerguelensis and Pringlea antiscorbutica were definitely present on the Kerguelen Islands during the late glaciation of the early Holocene some 10,000 years ago. It is also probable that they are survivors from the richer group of plants that grew on the islands prior to the extensive glacial cover of the Pleistocene, prior to about 2.58 million years ago.
