= Lenzia =

Lenzia may refer to:

- Lenzia (plant), a genus of plants in the family Montiaceae
- Lenzia (brachiopod), a fossil genus of brachiopods in the family Delthyrididae
- Lenzia, a taxonomic synonym for the genus Calvolia, a genus of arachnids in the family Winterschmidtiidae
- Lenzia, a taxonomic synonym for the genus Phaenopsectra, a genus of flies
