= Caloptilia linearis =

Scientific classification
- Kingdom: Animalia
- Phylum: Arthropoda
- Clade: Pancrustacea
- Class: Insecta
- Order: Lepidoptera
- Family: Gracillariidae
- Genus: Caloptilia
- Species: C. linearis

Binomial name
- Caloptilia linearis (Butler, 1877)

Synonyms
- Gracilaria linearis Butler, 1877

Species of moth endemic to New Zealand

Caloptilia linearis is a moth of the family Gracillariidae. This species was first described by Arthur Gardiner Butler in 1877. It is endemic to New Zealand and is found throughout the country. This species inhabits native forest. The larvae mine and then roll the leaves of species in the genus Coriaria including Coriaria ruscifolia, Coriaria angustissima, and Coriaria arborea. Adults are on the wing most months of the year but is observed most commonly from October until February.

== Taxonomy ==
This species was first described by British entomologist Arthur Gardiner Butler in 1877 and originally named Gracilaria linearis. Edward Meyrick gave a description of the adults and larva of this species in 1889. The New Zealand entomologist George Hudson discussed and illustrated this species under this name in his 1928 book The butterflies and moths of New Zealand. In 1988 the New Zealand entomologist John S. Dugale placed this species in the genus Caloptilia. Dugdale also pointed out that the species illustrated in the plate attached to that first description depicts the female what is now known as Gracilaria elaeas. The female holotype, collected in either Canterbury or Otago by James Hector, is held at the Natural History Museum, London.

== Description ==
Illustration by Hudson.

Live C. linearis.

Meyrick described the adults of this species as follows:

♂♀. 13-14 mm. Head and thorax reddish-ochreous, sometimes with a brassy gloss. Palpi whitish, terminal joint dark reddish-fuscous. Antennae fuscous annulated with whitish. Abdomen ochreous-whitish or grey. Legs dark purplish-fuscous, banded with white, posterior tibiae white. Forewings elongate, very narrow, long-pointed ; more or less deep reddish-ochreous, with a brassy gloss ; a hardly perceptibly paler triangular patch on costa before middle ; some scattered irregular blackish dots, mostly on posterior 2/3 of fold, and in a longitudinal series in posterior half of disc : cilia light grey or ochreous-grey-whitish, round apex and on costa reddish-ochreous. Hindwings and cilia grey or ochreous-grey-whitish.
Var. a. Forewings suffused with dark purplish - fuscous, with a bright reddish-ochreous streak along inner margin.

Hudson stated that there is considerable variation in the appearance of this species. Some specimens have three, more or less distinct, large pale spots on the costa. In others the fore-wings are clouded with purplish-brown except a pale streak along the dorsum.

Meyrick described the larva of this species as follows:

Larva 14-legged, moderate, cylindrical, tapering at both ends ; dull grey-greenish or grey-yellowish ; dorsal darker ; subdorsal broad, grey, or obsolete ; head and plate on second segment dark fuscous.

== Distribution ==
This species is endemic to New Zealand and can be found throughout the country. It is regarded as being common.

== Habitat and hosts ==
C. linearis frequents native forest. The larvae mine and fold the leaves of species in the genus Coriaria including Coriaria ruscifolia, Coriaria angustissima, and Coriaria arborea. Dugdale hypothesised that C. linearis larvae are hosted on evergreen or arborescent Coriania species in comparison to its sister species C. elaeas whose larvae feed on summer-green Coriaria species.

== Life history and behaviour ==
Larvae are commonly seen in January. Adults are on the wing most months of the year but is observed most commonly from October until February.

== Gallery showing variation ==

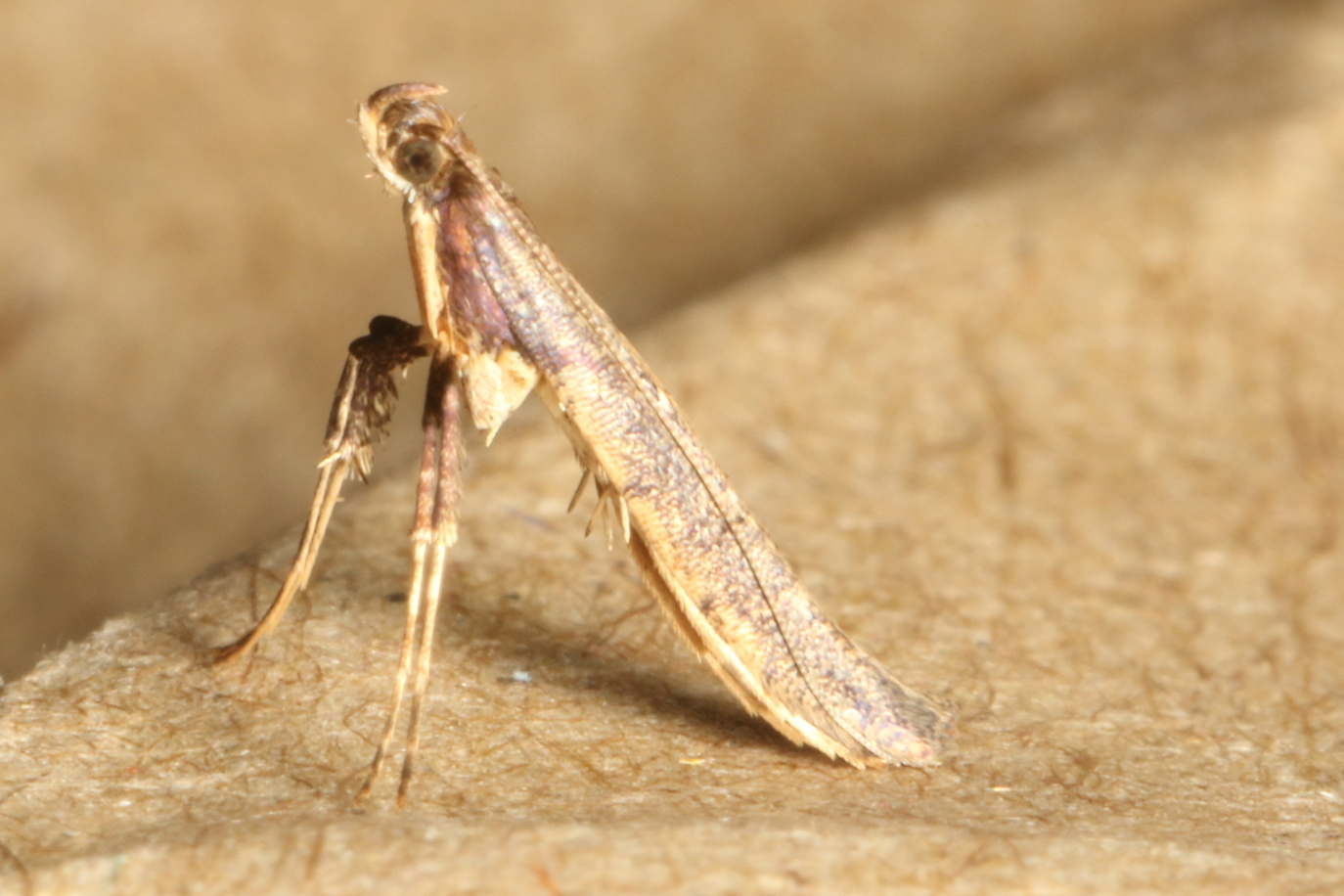
