= Ecology of the North Cascades =

Ecosystems of the mountain range on the Washington–British Columbia border

North Cascades
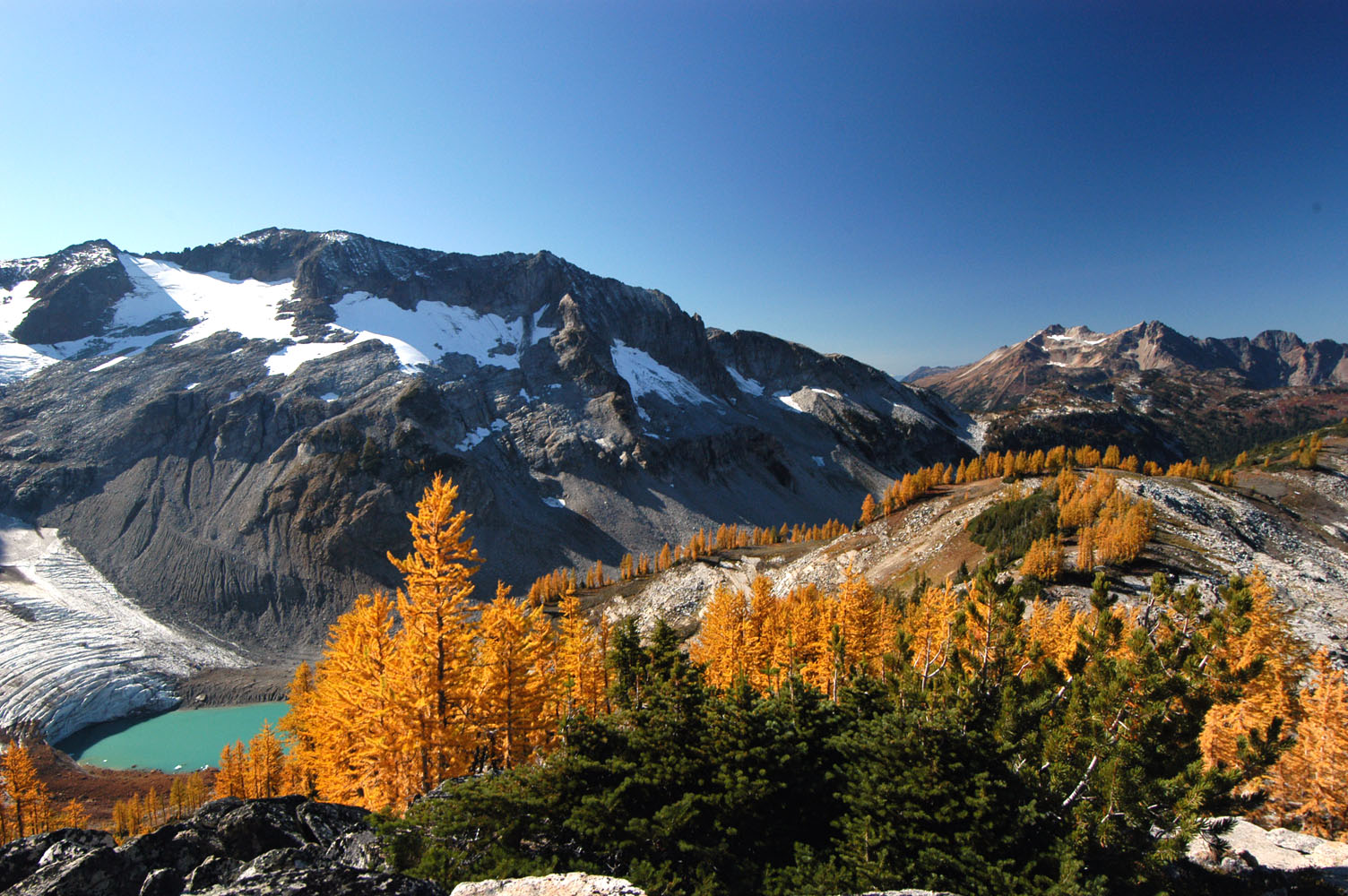
- The North Cascades are high and rugged with varied conifer species.

Ecology
- Realm: Nearctic

Geography
- Country: United States; Canada
- State: Washington; British Columbia

The Ecology of the North Cascades is heavily influenced by the high elevation and rain shadow effects of the mountain range. The North Cascades is a section of the Cascade Range from the South Fork of the Snoqualmie River in Washington, United States, to the confluence of the Thompson and Fraser Rivers in British Columbia, Canada, where the range is officially called the Cascade Mountains but is usually referred to as the Canadian Cascades. The North Cascades Ecoregion is a Level III ecoregion in the Commission for Environmental Cooperation's classification system.

The terrain of the North Cascades is composed of high, rugged mountains. It contains the greatest concentration of active alpine glaciers in the conterminous United States and has a variety of climatic zones. A dry continental climate occurs in the east and mild, maritime, rainforest conditions are found in the west. It is underlain by sedimentary and metamorphic rock in contrast to the adjoining Cascades which are composed of volcanics.

The North Cascades has a diversity of plant and animal species. It contains more than 1630 vascular plant species. The range has a number of top predators, including bald eagles, wolves, grizzly bears, mountain lions and black bears. The range is home to at least 75 species of mammals and 200 species of birds that either pass through or use the North Cascades for a breeding area. There are also 11 species of fish on the west side of the Cascades. Examples of amphibian species occurring in the North Cascades include the western toad (Bufo boreas) and the rough-skinned newt (Taricha granulosa).

The ecology of the area can be understood by following a west-to-east line at the southern end of the North Cascades, at approximately 47.5 degrees north. As the line passes through the Cascade range, it passes through a number of ecoregions, first getting higher and colder, then getting warmer, yet drier. Each of these component ecoregions can be described by either a tree indicator species, or by a lack of trees: western hemlock, Pacific silver fir, subalpine mountain hemlock, alpine, subalpine fir, and grand fir/Douglas fir.

== Western Hemlock Ecoregion ==
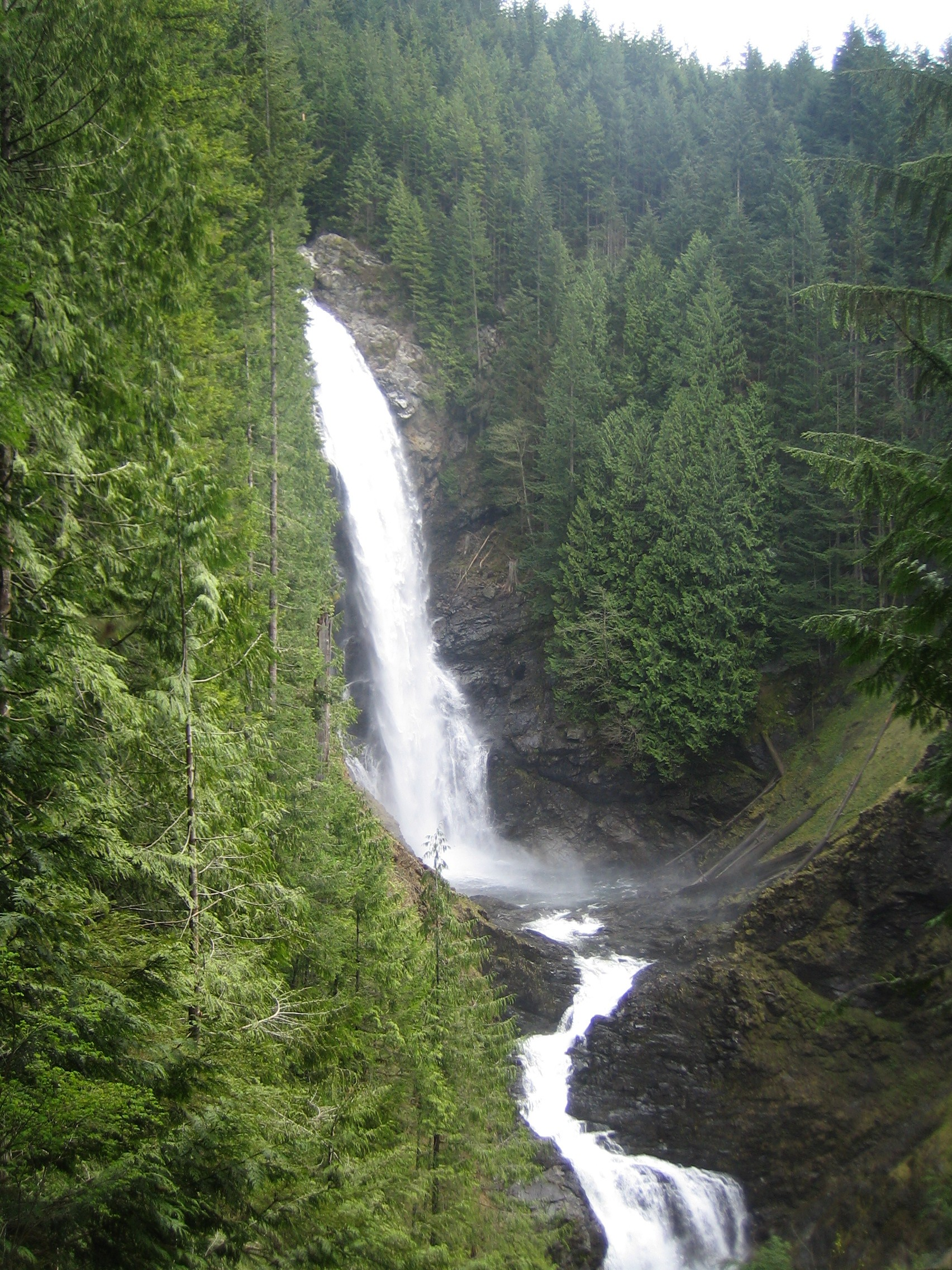
Wallace Falls and surrounding thick vegetation in the Wallace Falls State Park.

The Western Hemlock Ecoregion huddles in the lower west-side elevations of the North Cascades. Western hemlock is found from sea level up to 2,500 feet (800 m) in elevation. In the Alpine Lakes Wilderness this ecoregion can be found in the lower elevations around 1,000 to 2,000 feet (300 to 600 m) The average annual temperature is 47 °F (8 °C) and it gets between 70 and 300 centimetres (30 and 120 in) in precipitation per year. This ecoregion is evidenced by the dense stands of western hemlock, Douglas fir, western red cedar and red alder. The understory is primarily composed of salal, hazel, salmonberry, devil's club and Oregon grape. The western hemlock (Tsuga heterophylla) is an extremely shade tolerant tree and it is common to find its seedlings and saplings in the understories of the forest floors. It prefers moist temperate conditions. As conditions get drier and colder they don't fare as well. Western hemlocks can reach over 200 feet (60 m) in height with a diameter of 3 to 4 feet (0.9 to 1.2 m). They can be identified by their drooping leader at the top of the tree. It is not uncommon to find western hemlocks growing in a row on a nurse log. The Western Hemlock Ecoregion offers an abundance of life. Black-tailed deer graze in their understories. Fox, coyotes, cougars, and an assortment of herbivore mammals and birds can also be found in these low elevation forests.

== Silver Fir Ecoregion ==
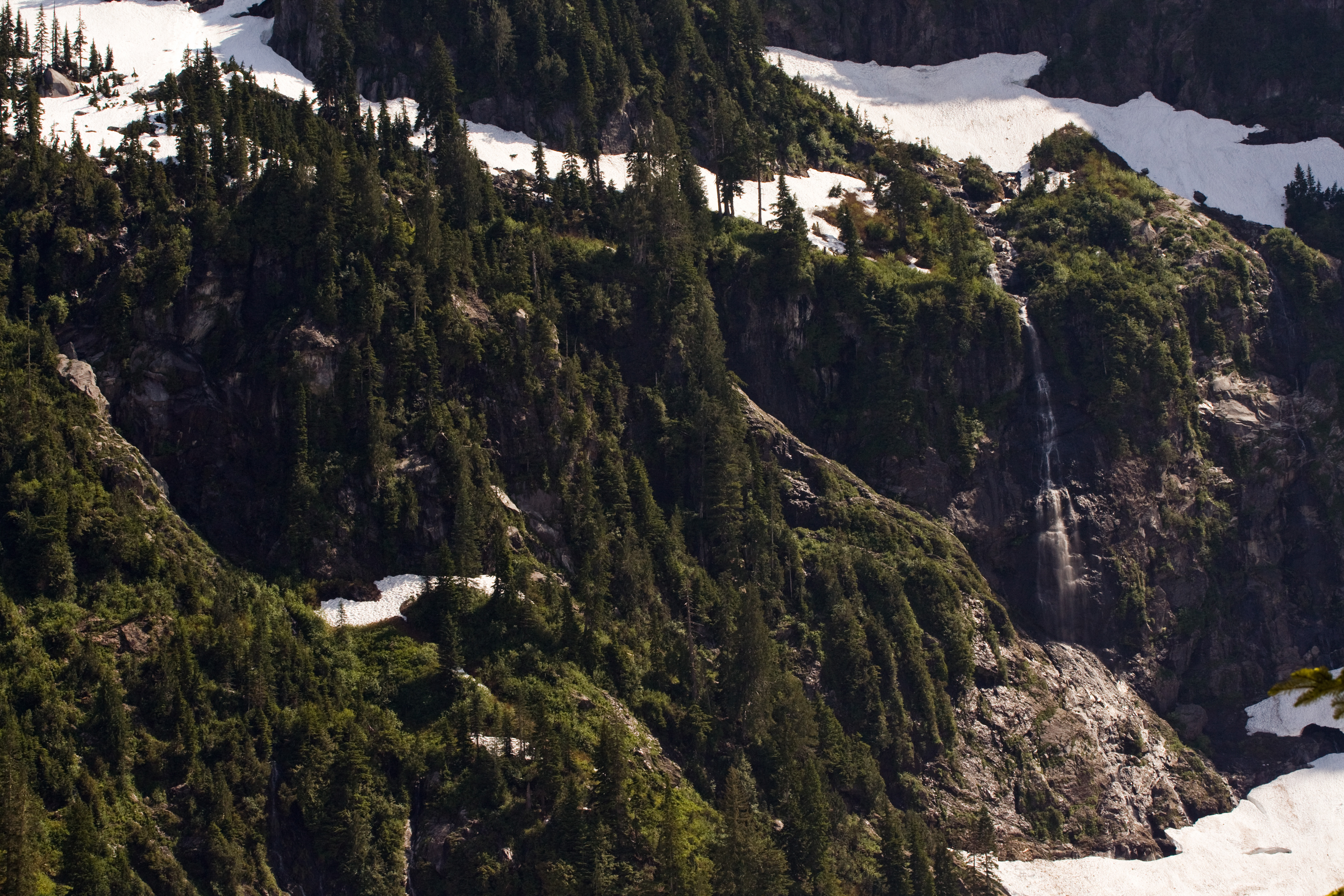
Lake Twenty-two cirque headwall at 2,400 feet (730 m).

The mid-elevation forests in the North Cascades with an elevation between 2,000 and 4,300 feet (600 and 1,300 m) is the Silver Fir Ecoregion. The Silver Fir Ecoregion makes up for much of the valleys in the Alpine Lakes area. The average annual temperature in this ecoregion is 42 °F (6 °C) and the average precipitation in centimeters is between 220 and 280 centimetres (87 and 110 in). Typical montane forests in this ecoregion is dominated by Pacific silver fir and also contains noble fir, Douglas fir, and Alaska yellow-cedar. Coarse woody debris is very characteristic of the Silver Fir Ecoregion, providing microsites for organisms. The Pacific silver fir zone is in some of the steepest parts of the topography and heavy snow often leads to avalanche gullies. In every major drainage basin along the western slopes of the Cascade Mountains there is evidence of avalanche tracks breaking up the forested vegetation with nonforested vegetation. These gullies provide sites of new successional growth as they move toward a coniferous forest again. Because of the dense forests of the Silver Fir Ecoregion, it was the preferred area for commercial logging prior to designation of areas as wilderness.

The Pacific silver fir (Abies amabilis) is extremely tolerant of shade and does not fare as well in drought or warmer temperatures. It can grow as high as 180 feet (55 m) and reach 3–5 feet (0.9–1.5 m) in diameter. The understory communities of the Pacific silver fir can vary depending on moisture availability. Common understory shrubs include the vine maple, salal, Cascade Oregon grape, blueberry, mountain huckleberry, devil's club, and fool's huckleberry. Common understory herbs are bear grass, twin flower, pipsissewa, dwarf dogwood or bunchberry, bead lily, trailing blackberry, low false Solomon's seal, foam flower, trillium, oak fern, and lady fern. The microclimate of the understory is moderated by the forest canopy causing the conditions to be cooler and moister in the summer and warmer in the winter. Pacific silver fir seedlings and saplings are often found growing under their own canopies or those of a mixed canopy forest. Along streams in this ecoregion, breaks in the forest are replaced by mountain alder, willow and vine maple and herbs such as saxifrage, yellow willow-herb, monkey flowers, and bluebells can be found. Mountain alder and vine maple can also be found around lake edges and in areas of flat or gentle slopes, bogs, or marsh habitat. Examples of Pacific silver fir forests can be found in the Commonwealth Basin and the Snow Lake areas of the Alpine Lakes Wilderness.

== Subalpine Mountain Hemlock Ecoregion ==
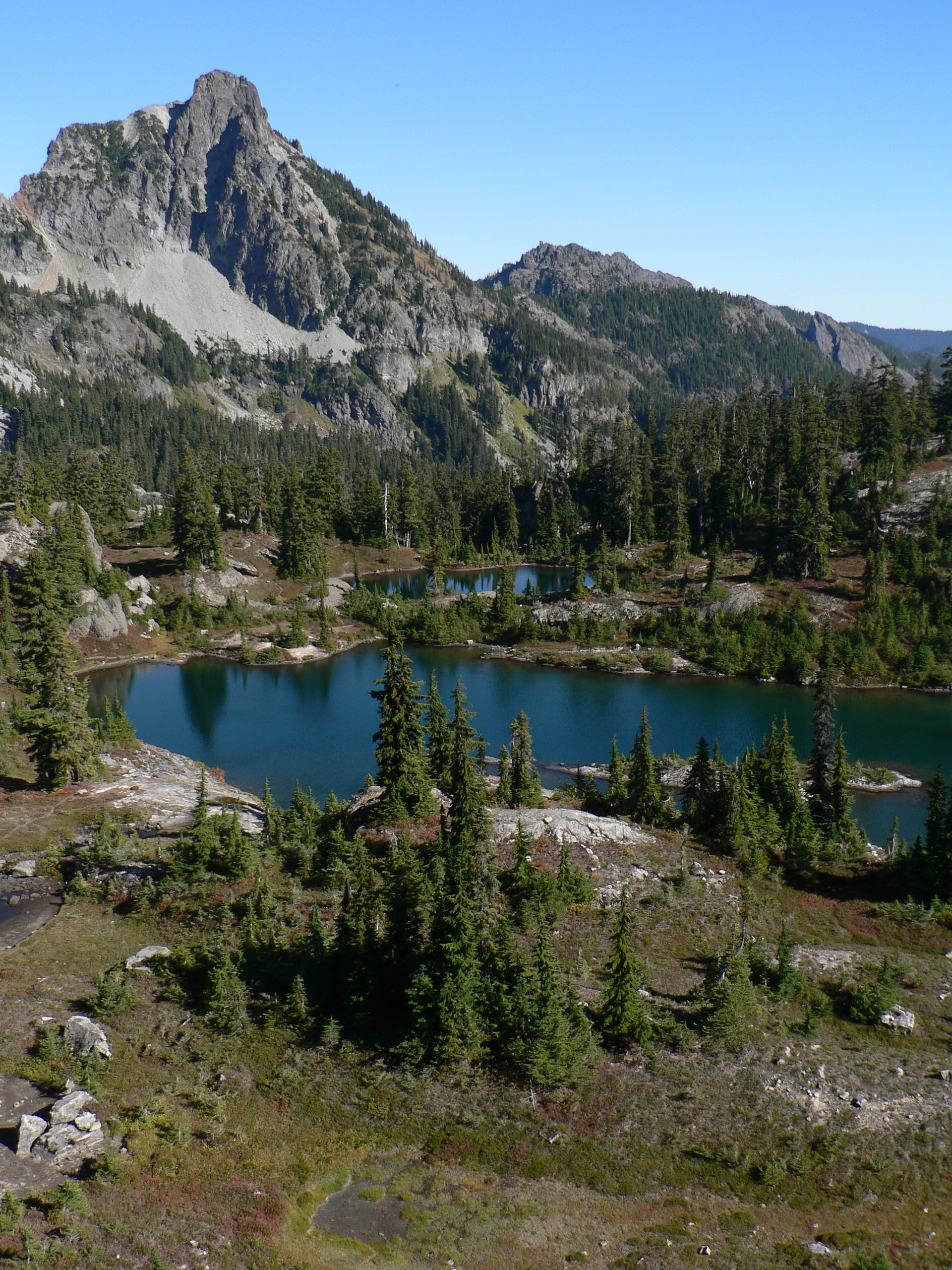
Mountain hemlock and subalpine fir forest around Lila Lake (elev. 5,197 feet / 1,584 m).

Moving up in elevation from the Silver Fir Ecoregion, between about 4,000 and 5,400 feet (1,200 and 1,600 m) on the west side of the Cascade Range, the ecoregion shifts to the Subalpine Mountain Hemlock Ecoregion. This ecoregion has a colder annual average temperature of 39 °F (4 °C) with average annual precipitation between 160 and 280 centimetres (60 and 110 in). This ecoregion consists of mountain hemlock forests, subalpine meadows, streams, lakes, wetlands and avalanche gullies creating distinct patterns of new succession. In the lower ends of this ecoregion there are continuous closed canopy forests while the higher reaches will see mosaics of meadows with patches of mountain hemlock forests. The mountain hemlock forests consist of mountain hemlock, subalpine fir, Alaska yellow-cedar, and Pacific silver fir. Washington's alpine and subalpine areas account for about 4.4% of its total land area.

Progressing upward from the gradient of Silver Fir and Mountain Hemlock ecoregions, the mountain hemlock (Tsuga mertensiana) tends to become the dominant conifer, although it may codominate with the Alaska cedar and Pacific silver fir. Mountain hemlock trees live as long as 1000 years: longer than the Pacific silver fir. Trees between 500 and 700 years may be 100 to 125 feet (30 to 40 m) tall. Hemlock cones are about 2–3 inches (5–8 cm) in length and develop at the ends of branches. These conifers are easy to distinguish amongst the others with their dense grayish-green needles. According to Franklin and Dyrness, the understory where the mountain hemlock and Pacific silver fir co-dominate is dominated by tall mountain huckleberry; where the Alaska cedar dominates, the understory is dominated by dense collage of rhododendron, huckleberry and mountain ash.

In the higher boundaries of subalpine ecosystem, where the abiotic conditions are more stressful, trees are clumped together in patchy islands. Trees in this area can be recognized by its krummholz form. Trees of this upper boundary will take on a flag appearance with branches extending from one side indicating the prevailing wind directions. The skirt height of the trees is indicative of the height of snow cover where branches tend not to grow. There are various reasons as to why these trees take this form. Strong winds combined with ice particles will cause abrasion scouring the waxy cuticle from one side of the tree creating damage that will prevent branch formation and growth. In addition, the wind will cause desiccation and evaporation in the needles causing branches to die on this side of the trees.

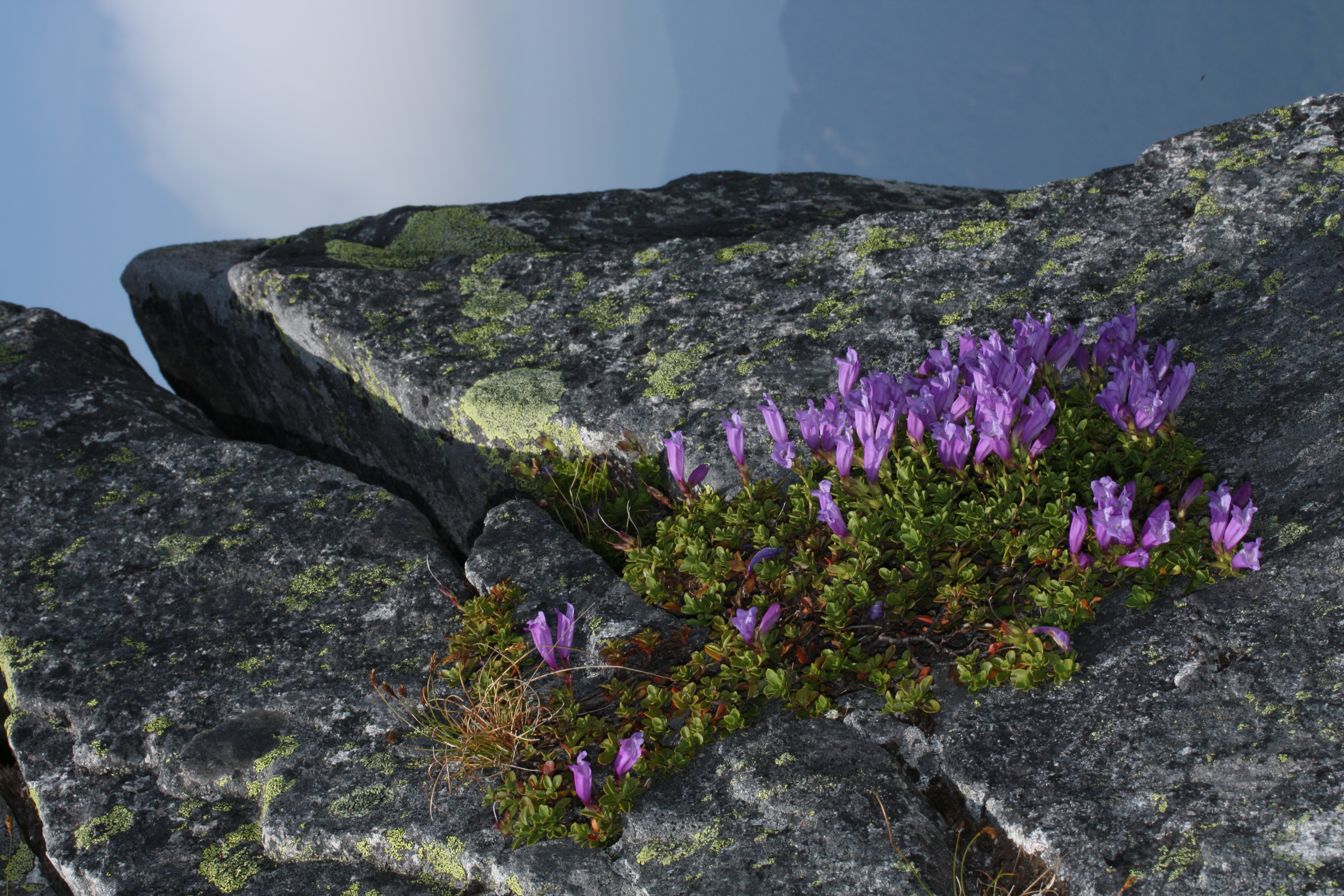
Penstemon davidsonii in Mount Pilchuck State Park at 5,300 feet (1,600 m).

Scattered amongst the island patches of trees in the upper boundaries are parkland areas with showy meadows. Events such as fire, avalanches, snow slumping and climate change make the boundaries of these areas and the balance of trees and meadows dynamic. The forest islands typically consist of mountain hemlock, subalpine fir, and Alaska cedar. Often there are invasions of trees into meadow areas and this reached a peak in the 1930s due to considerable warming. Invasions of meadows by trees can also occur with disturbances.

The beauty of meadows is very popular amongst hikers. Wildflowers that are found in this ecoregion are the tiger lily, glacier lily, bead lily, queen's cup, columbine, aster, trillium, pearly everlasting, valerian, skyrocket, shooting star, penstemon, lousewort, mountain bog gentian, monkey flower, monkshood, bluebell, bellflower, bleeding heart, Tweedy's lewisia, balsamroot, wild orchids and more. The wildflowers are at their peak in the meadows and along streams from mid-July to mid-August. The parklands of the Mountain Hemlock Ecoregion draw their distinct characteristics from the climate and topography.

The two dominant vegetation types of this mountain region, forests and meadows, have very distinct differences in their microclimates. The amount of solar radiation and UV exposure can vary substantially in our northern latitude largely based on the time of day, slope, season, cloud cover and vegetation. Temperatures adjust accordingly to this solar radiation and exposure. The parklands of this montane region have a much larger range of temperatures as compared to the hemlock forests. The range can be as much as 50 °F (28 °C) while the range in the forests rarely exceeds 20 °F (11 °C). This is due to the canopy of the trees, creating a much more protected environment as compared to the open meadows. In addition soil temperatures directly impact biological activity affecting soil organisms and root systems. Daily and season temperature changes greatly affect the soils' heat loss and gain. However, the snowpack acts as an insulating buffer against temperature change in soils. The mountain hemlock forests are the wettest and coldest of the Cascade forest zones.

In the richness of this region many animal species pass through this zone at least one season a year such as mountain goat, black-tailed deer, American black bear, elk, cougar, and many bird species. Only the whistling hoary marmot is restricted to alpine and subalpine areas. Besides the richness of mammals there is a richness of insects that are integral to the abundance of flowering plant species in this area. Another important pollinator in this area is the hummingbird. There is still much to be researched and discovered to better understand species interactions and reliance in both the alpine and subalpine ecosystems.

== Alpine Ecoregion ==
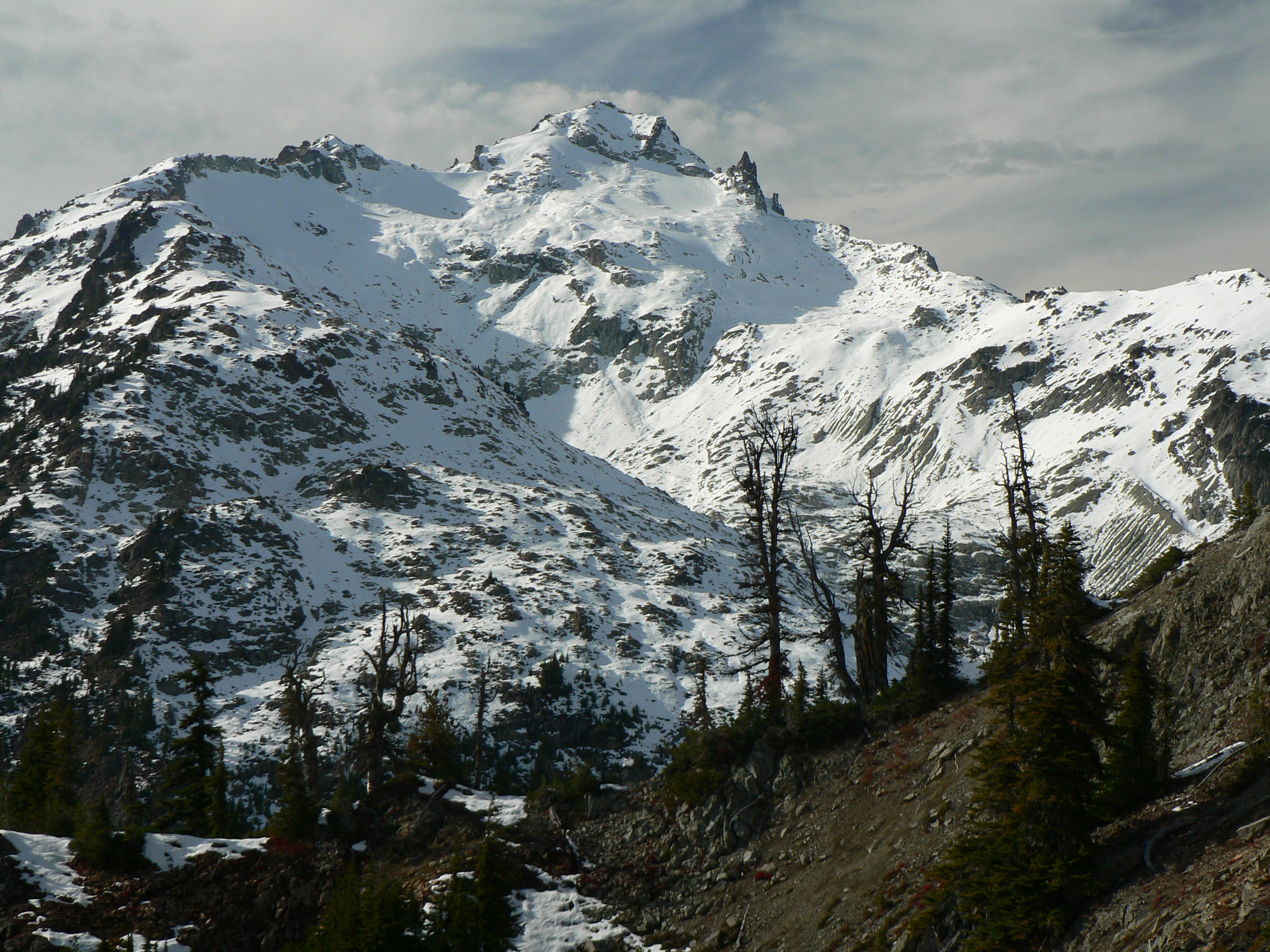
Mount Daniel, looking up from 6,100 feet (1,900 m).

The Alpine Ecoregion makes up much of the North Cascades. Alpine areas such as this are rugged with rocky ridges, snowfields, partially vegetated terrain, and are above the natural treeline. The timberline in the Alpine Lakes Wilderness is found at approximately 6,000 feet (1,800 m). The average annual temperature is 37.5 °F (3 °C) with only a mean annual precipitation of 46 centimetres (18 in). These conditions along with winds and blowing ice are not conducive for trees. Because of the extreme temperatures and low precipitation there are few plant species as compared to lower elevation ecosystems and they are simpler in structure. However, precipitation, or lack thereof, is a more important limiting factor than temperature. Both plant and animal species have adapted in many different ways to deal with this challenging environment.

This high elevation habitat of high winds, prolonged snow cover, steep terrain, high temperature variability, and intense UV radiation lead to special species adaptations. Alpine regions generally have hypoxic conditions that lead to additional energy expenses for organisms. Increased elevations usually lead to shorter breeding season in animals, as is the case in the alpine ecosystems in the North Cascades. In addition to the shorter breeding season, wildlife often requires seasonal movement to different elevations in order to find adequate food and habitat. However, species such as the white-tailed ptarmigan, hoary marmots, and pikas remain in high elevations of the Cascades year round left only to go to patchy and scattered alpine vegetation. The majority of species will move to lower elevations at some time throughout their life history. Adaptations such as torpor in hummingbirds, the ability of mountain goats and coyotes to camouflage in the landscape, animals developing extra fat deposits, and the raptor's ability to move efficiently in the strong winds illustrate just some of the ways species have been ability to cope with alpine conditions. The white-tailed ptarmigan has an adaption of changing its plumage from white in the winter to brown in the summer in order to camouflage. Many species in higher elevations produce fewer offspring than in lower elevations but spend more time nurturing their young.

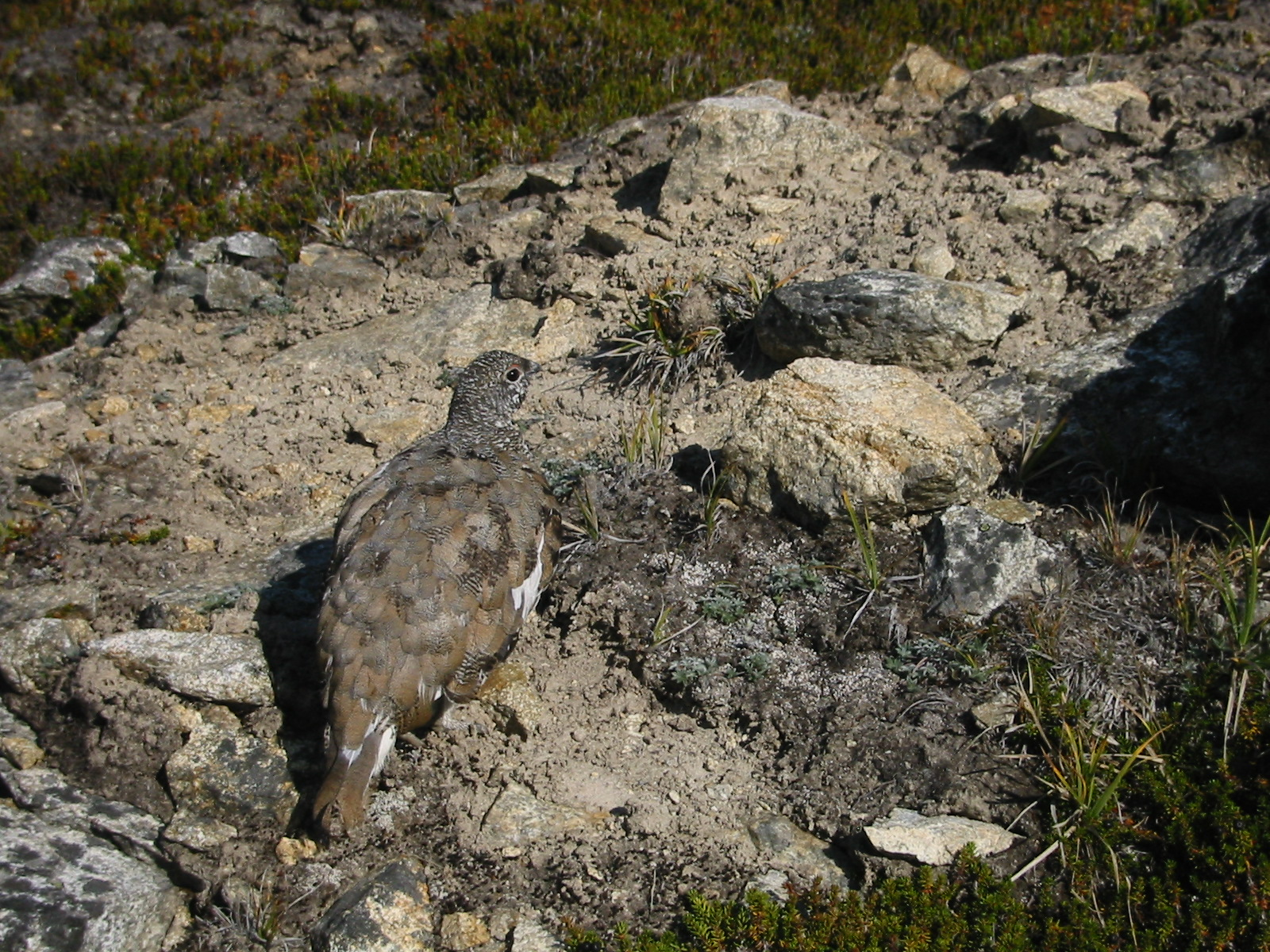
A white-tailed ptarmigan blends into the alpine tundra east of Glacier Peak.

While alpine ecosystems provide challenging abiotic conditions for species there are advantages to animal species to habituate these areas. In the winter while there is extensive snow pack there are also strong winds that will expose herbaceous stems and seeds for animals to forage on. Insects that are blown up from lower elevations will land on the snow beds in the spring offering much nutrition for birds and other mammals that breed in the alpine. When snowfields melt it creates a gradient of plant phenology which provides emerging vegetation over a period of time for herbivores to feed on and migrate along this line. Spring foraging is believed to be crucial in the breeding in a number of species such as the mountain goat. Leaf budding and fruiting in late summer past the edges of snowfields also offer food for the animals that depend on this area. Black bears, songbirds and marmots in the North Cascades and Alpine Lakes can find cover in lush vegetation in avalanche chutes adjacent to the subalpine forests. There seems to also be evidence that there is a lower rate of parasitism and disease in these high alpine elevations offering yet another advantage to alpine species. The alpine grouse is one example of an alpine animal that has few blood infections or intestinal parasites. Other animal species in the summer months will migrate into the higher alpine elevations to avoid insects and forage in the meadows.

== Subalpine Fir Ecoregion ==
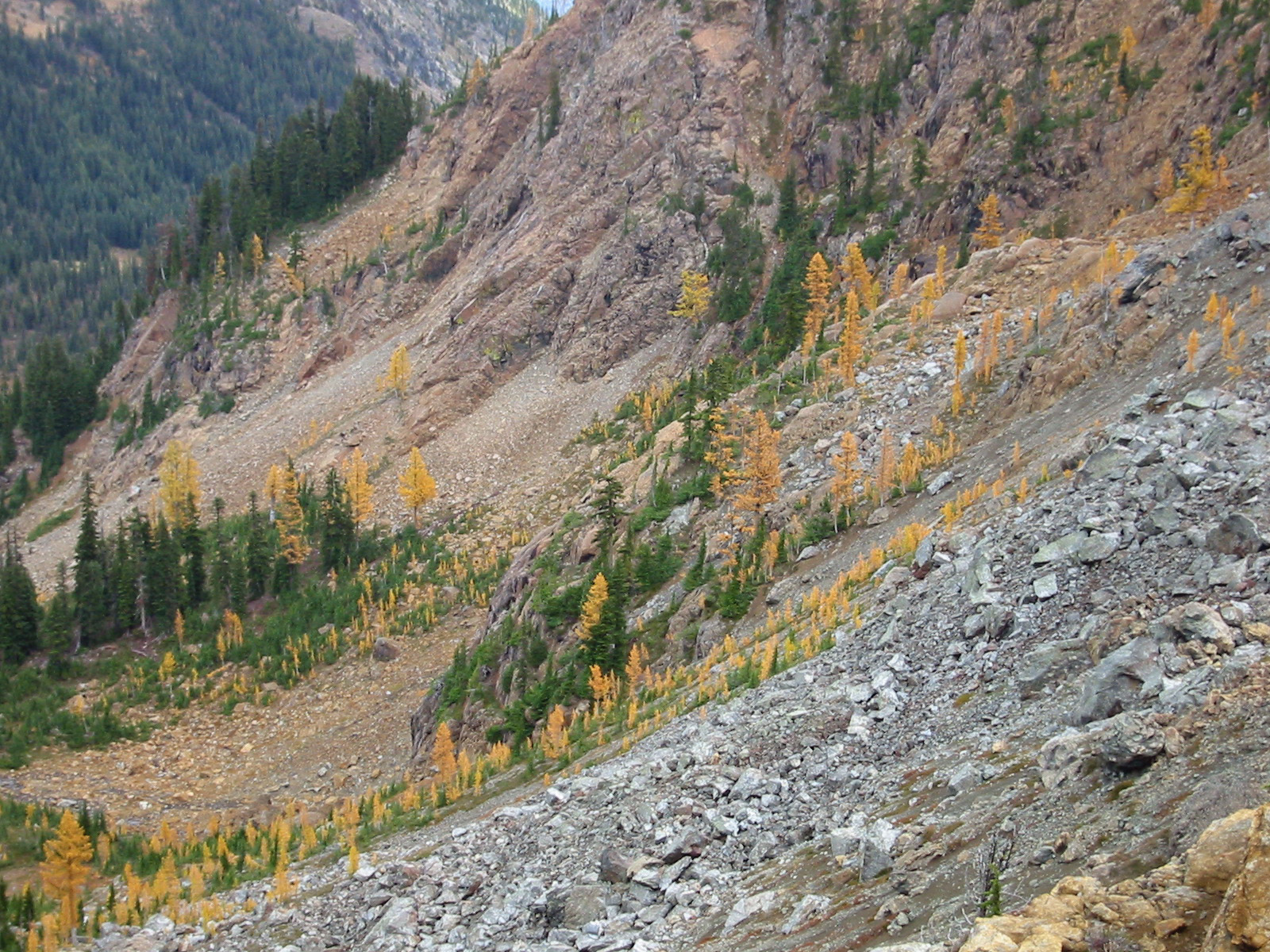
Patchy forest of subalpine fir, mountain hemlock, and subalpine larch at 6,200 feet (1,900 m) in the Wenatchee Mountains.

The Subalpine Fir Ecoregion, descending down the east-side of the Cascade Range, reaches elevations between 4,200 and 6,000 feet (1,300 and 1,800 m). This area has the same mean annual temperature of 39 °F (4 °C) as the Mountain Hemlock Ecoregion, but a drastically lower annual average precipitation of between 100 and 150 centimetres (40 and 60 in) with a much larger portion falling as snow rather than as rain. The ecosystems in this ecoregion are the subalpine fir forests, subalpine meadows, avalanche gullies, and freshwater wetlands, streams and lakes.

The subalpine fir forests in the North Cascades include Douglas fir, Engelmann spruce, subalpine larch, and whitebark pine. The Engelmann spruce and the subalpine fir are commonly found together. In the higher boundaries of this ecoregion the subalpine fir takes on the krummholz form. The Subalpine Fir Ecoregion is characterized by its patches of forest and meadows in its upper range similarly to the Mountain Hemlock Ecoregion.

== Grand Fir/Douglas Fir Ecoregion ==
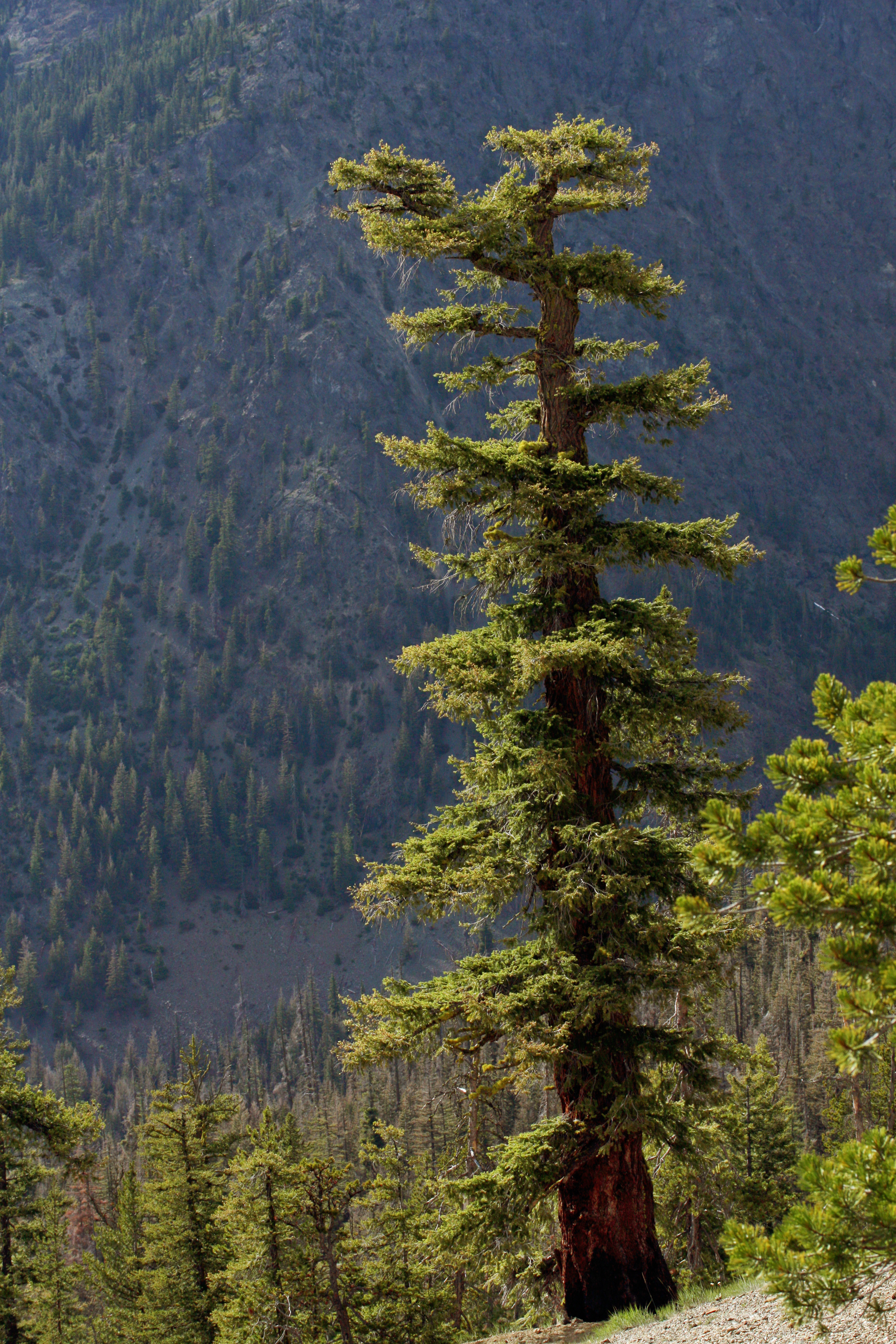
Douglas fir at 4,965 feet (1,513 m) in the Wenatchee Mountains.

Descending down the east side of the Cascade Range is the Grand Fir/Coast Douglas-fir Ecoregion with a very diverse forest. This forest has the most diverse trees of the forested ecoregions in Washington state which includes grand fir, Douglas fir, Engelmann spruce, subalpine fir, ponderosa pine, lodgepole pine, western white pine, whitebark pine, western larch, and subalpine larch. This ecoregion has an annual mean temperature of 46 °F (8 °C) and receives between 60 and 110 centimetres (24 and 43 in) of precipitation per year. The elevation range of this ecoregion is between 2,000 and 5,000 feet (600 and 1,500 m).

In the upper regions of this ecoregion, the dominant conifers are the mountain hemlock and subalpine fir and in the lower boundary the grand fir and Coast Douglas-fir dominate. There is a variety of understory vegetation in this ecoregion that includes pinegrass, elk sedge, sedges, low shrubs, vine maple, white alder, and huckleberry. This diverse landscape offers habitat to many species including grazers such as deer, elk, black bear, herbivores, and a variety of birds.

== Fauna ==
A variety of reptiles, amphibians, mammals, birds and arthropods are found in the North Cascades. A small number of grizzly bears (Ursus arctos horribilis) inhabit the far northern Cascades, near the Canada–United States border. A breeding pack of wolves was confirmed in Okanogan County in 2008, the first such pack in Washington state since the 1930s. Other predator species include mountain lions, black bears, fishers, and wolverines.

Over 75 species of mammals occur in the range, including the mountain goat that lives in the high alpine tundra. Bird species include the bald eagle, osprey, and harlequin duck. Examples of amphibians occurring in the North Cascades include the western toad, Bufo boreas, and the rough-skinned newt, Taricha granulosa. An unusual feature of the rough-skinned newt populations is that approximately ninety percent of the adult population is perennibranchiate.

== See also ==
- Alpine Lakes Wilderness
- Glacier Peak Wilderness
- Henry M. Jackson Wilderness
- North Cascades National Park
- Ecozones of Canada
- Biogeoclimatic zones of British Columbia
