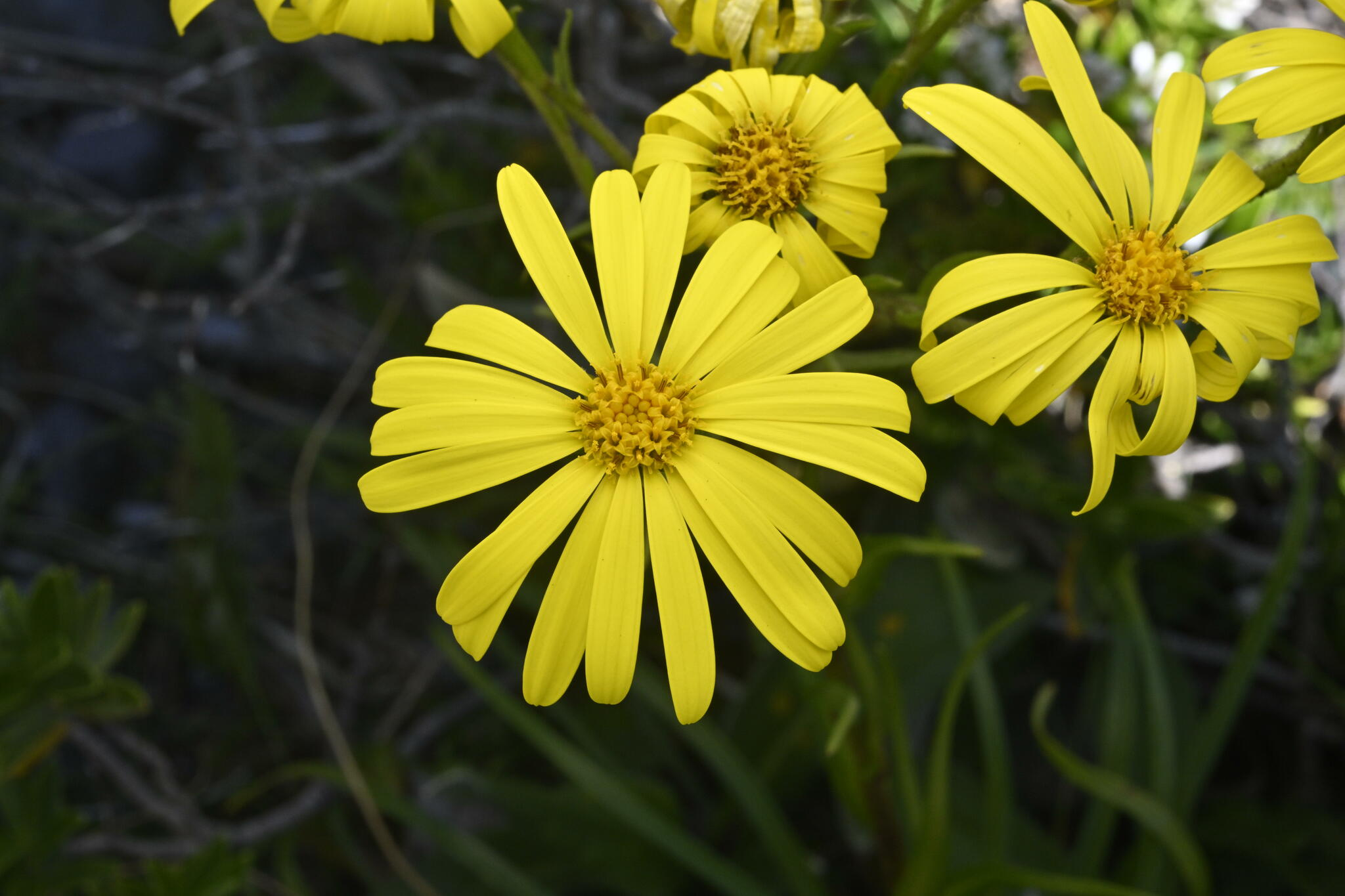
- Dolichoglottis lyalli in Milford Sound

Conservation status
- Not Threatened (NZ TCS)

Scientific classification
- Kingdom: Plantae
- Clade: Embryophytes
- Clade: Tracheophytes
- Clade: Angiosperms
- Clade: Eudicots
- Clade: Asterids
- Order: Asterales
- Family: Asteraceae
- Genus: Dolichoglottis
- Species: D. lyallii

Binomial name
- Dolichoglottis lyallii (Hook.f.) B.Nord.

= Dolichoglottis lyallii =

Species of flowering plant

Dolichoglottis lyallii, the yellow snow margueritte, is a species of flowering plant, endemic to New Zealand.

== Description ==
Dolichoglottis lyallii has yellow ligules, up to 2.5 cm (0.98 in) long, and the capitulum (or flower head) appears entirely yellow. It is a tall flower, growing up to 50 cm (20 in). The leaves are long and grass-like.

Dolichoglottis lyallii is a rhizomatous geophyte, and a perennial plant.

== Distribution and habitat ==
Dolichoglottis lyallii is native to the South Island and Stewart Island.

== Etymology ==
The specific epithet, lyallii is named for David Lyall.
