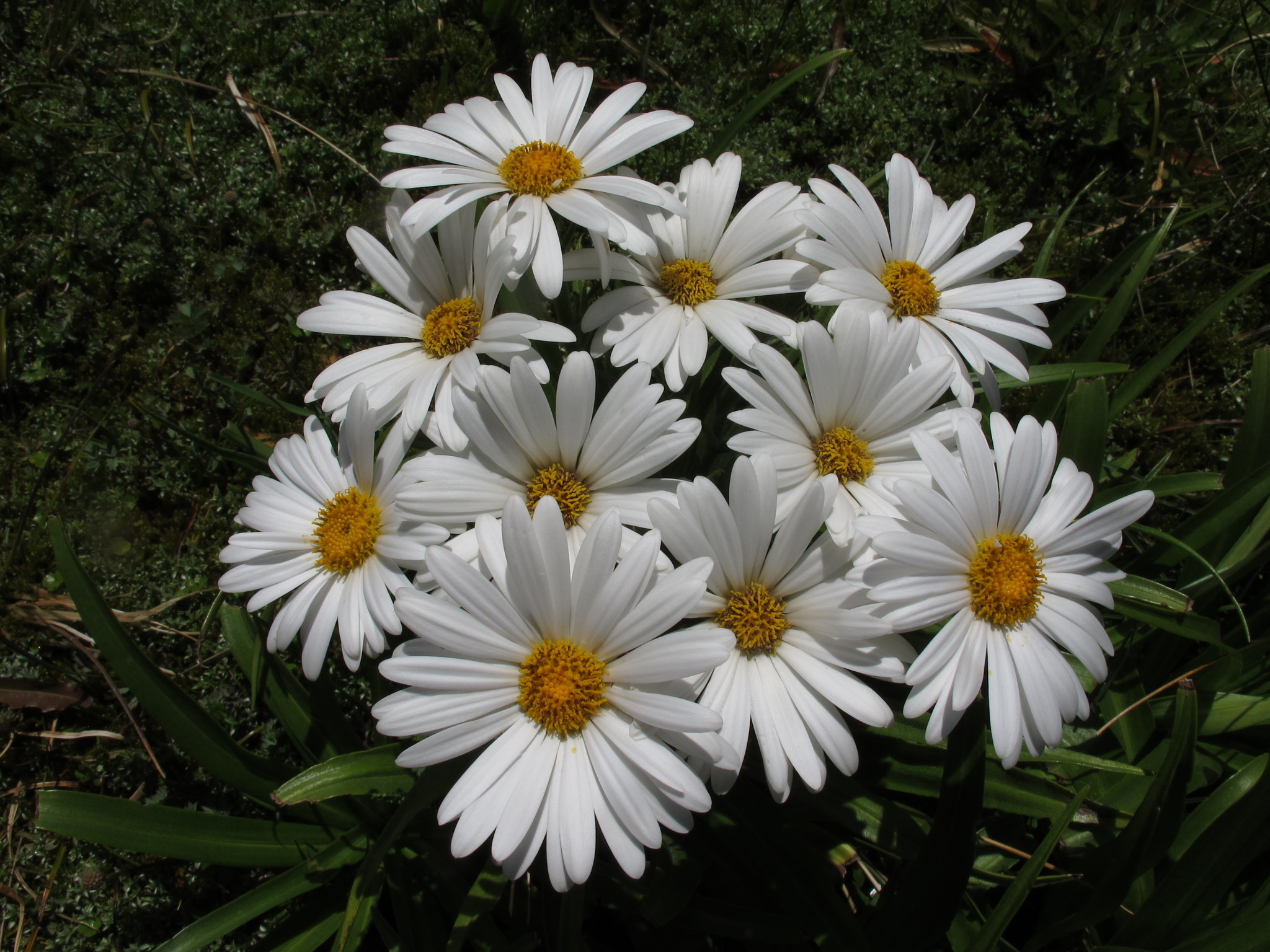
- Dolichoglottis scorzoneroides

Scientific classification
- Kingdom: Plantae
- Clade: Embryophytes
- Clade: Tracheophytes
- Clade: Angiosperms
- Clade: Eudicots
- Clade: Asterids
- Order: Asterales
- Family: Asteraceae
- Subfamily: Asteroideae
- Tribe: Senecioneae
- Genus: Dolichoglottis; B.Nord.

= Dolichoglottis =

Genus of flowering plants

Dolichoglottis is a genus of flowering plants in the daisy family, Asteraceae.

Species

- Dolichoglottis lyallii (Hook.f.) B.Nord. -New Zealand South Island
- Dolichoglottis scorzoneroides (Hook.f.) B.Nord. - New Zealand South Island
