= James Hector =

Scottish-New Zealand scientist (1834–1907)

Sir James Hector KCMG
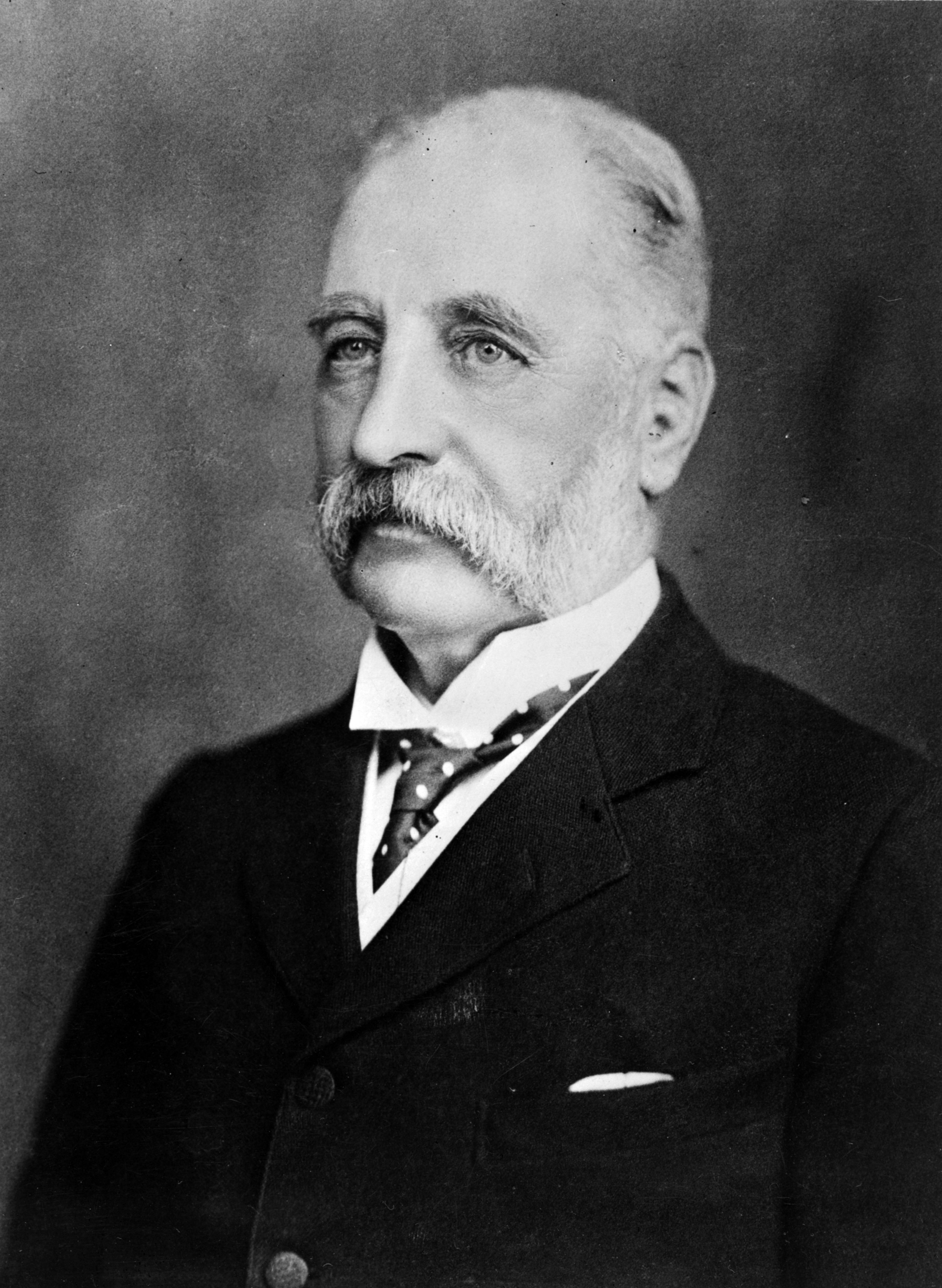
- Born: 16 March 1834; Edinburgh, Scotland
- Died: 6 November 1907 (aged 73); Lower Hutt, New Zealand
- Education: University of Edinburgh
- Occupations: Geologist, naturalist, surgeon
- Known for: Palliser's expedition, New Zealand Geological Survey
- Spouse: Maria Georgiana Monro
- Relatives: David Monro (father-in-law), Charles Monro (brother-in-law)
- Awards: Lyell Medal (1877); Clarke Medal (1887)
- Scientific career
- Workplaces: Geological Survey of New Zealand, University of New Zealand (Chancellor)
- Author abbrev. (zoology): Hector

Sir James Hector KCMG FRS FRSE (16 March 1834 – 6 November 1907) was a Scottish-New Zealand geologist, naturalist, and surgeon who accompanied the Palliser Expedition as a surgeon and geologist. He went on to have a lengthy career as a government employed man of science in New Zealand, and during this period he dominated the colony's scientific institutions in a way that no single person has since.

== Early life ==
He was born at 11 Danube Street in Stockbridge, Edinburgh the son of Alexander Hector WS and his wife, Margaret Macrostie.

He attended the Edinburgh Academy from 1844 to 1845. At 14, he began articles as an actuary at his father's office. He joined the University of Edinburgh as a medical student and received his medical degree in 1856 at the age of 22.

== Palliser expedition ==
Shortly after receiving his medical degree, upon the recommendation of Sir Roderick Murchison – director-general of the British Geological Survey – Hector was appointed geologist on the Palliser Expedition under the command of John Palliser. The goal of the Palliser expedition to British North America (now Canada) was to explore new railway routes for the Canadian Pacific Railway and to collect new species of plants.

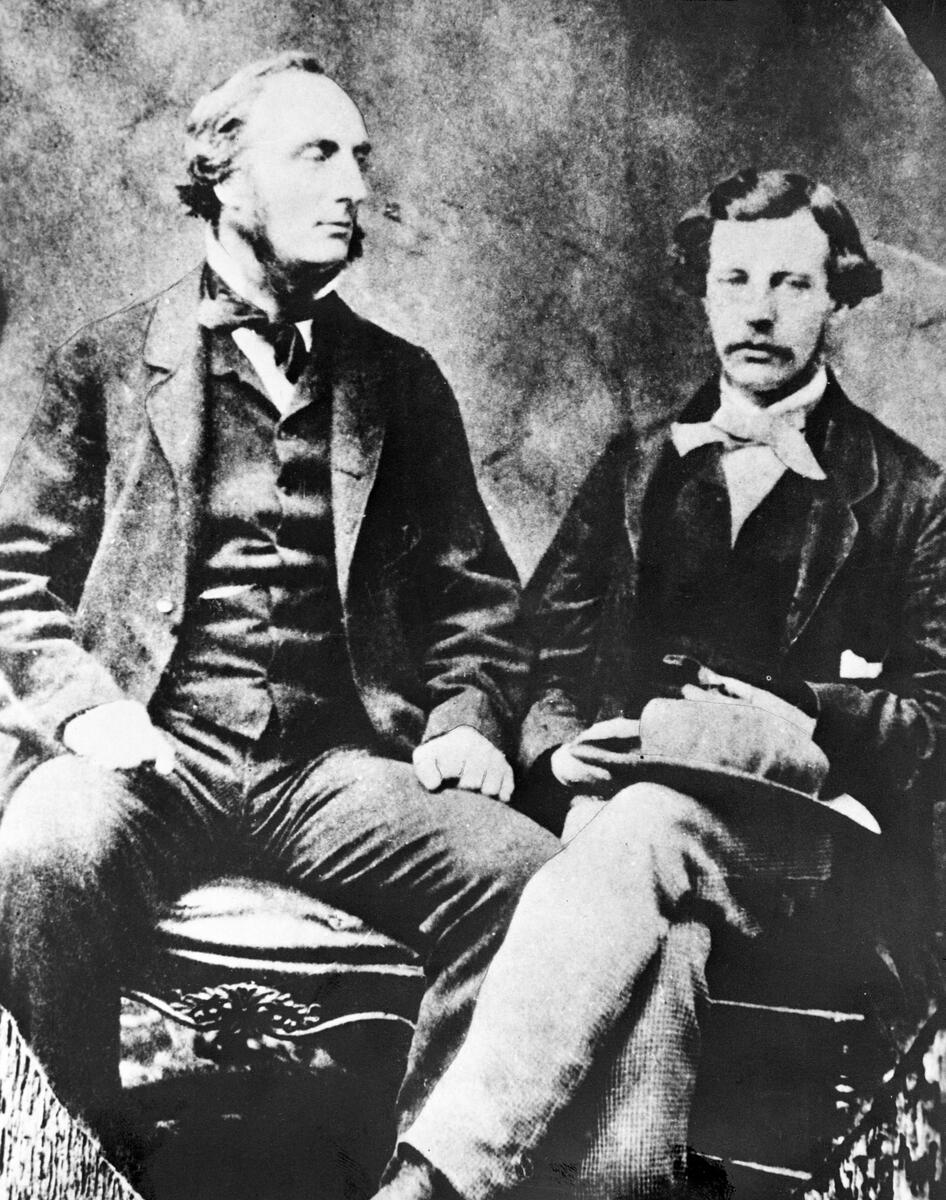
Captain John Palliser and James Hector

In 1858, when Palliser's expedition was exploring a mountain pass near the continental divide of the Canadian Rockies, one of Hector's packhorses fell into the river. As it was being pulled from the water, his own horse strayed and when chasing after it, Hector records, he was kicked in the chest and knocked unconscious. He wrote in his diary of the expedition: "In attempting to recatch my own horse, which had strayed off while we were engaged with the one in the water, he kicked me in the chest". His companions, thinking him dead, dug a grave for him and prepared to put him in. His premature burial was cancelled when he regained consciousness. The pass and nearby river have been known since as Kicking Horse Pass and Kicking Horse River.

The legend of the kicking horse is now firmly established in popular Canadian history. However, as politely noted by the Palliser scholar Irene Spry, it "embodies Hector's not always accurate reminiscences about the Expedition". The only member of the expedition who outlived Hector and who could verify what actually happened was the Métis Peter Erasmus, and his account does not support Hector's. According to Erasmus:

The doctor was knocked unconscious. We all leapt from our horses and rushed up to him, but all our attempts to help him recover his senses were of no avail. We then carried him to the shade of some big evergreens while we pitched camp. We were now in serious trouble, and unless Nimrod fetched in game our situation looked hopeless. One man stayed and watched the unconscious doctor. The rest of us took turns trying to catch trout that we could see in the clear mountain water of the river. Dr. Hector must have been unconscious for at least two hours when Sutherland yelled for us to come up; he was now conscious but in great pain. He asked for his kit and directed me to prepare some medicine that would ease the pain. I had him sign a document stating the facts of the accident in case his illness might prove serious. He readily agreed that it would be the proper thing to do.

In 1903 during a visit to Canada, Hector said of his mishap in Kicking Horse Pass, "When I regained consciousness, my grave was dug and they were preparing to put me in it. So that's how Kicking Horse got its name and how I came to have a grave in this part of the world."

== New Zealand ==
Following his return to Britain after the Palliser expedition, Hector again secured a paid scientific position with Roderick Murchison's and Joseph Hooker's help. In April 1862 he arrived in Dunedin in New Zealand to conduct a three-year geological survey of Otago, soon after the discovery of gold there. Hector travelled throughout the south of New Zealand's South Island to assess its potential for settlement and to record the location of useful minerals. He also assembled a staff of half a dozen men to assist with such tasks as fossil collecting, chemical analysis, and botanical and zoological taxonomy. Some of these men, such as William Skey (mineral analyst), Richard Gore (clerk), and John Buchanan (botanical artist and draftsman), stayed with him for many years. As part of the survey, a Geological Map of Otago was created, known as Hector's Map. In 1865 a "Sketch Map of the Geology of New Zealand" was produced, and in 1869 it was revised and published by the Government Printing Office in New Zealand; giving a synthesis of New Zealand geological research in the first geological map of the country.

=== Chief government scientist ===
The museum director's residence circa 1880, Colonial Museum on the left

In 1865 Hector was appointed to found the Geological Survey of New Zealand, and he moved to Wellington to supervise the construction of the Colonial Museum, which was to be the Survey's headquarters. As the chief government-employed scientist, Hector gave politicians advice on questions as diverse as exporting wool to Japan and improving fibre production from New Zealand flax. He was the first manager of the Wellington Botanic Gardens on their opening in 1869. He went on to develop the Gardens with the New Zealand Institute (now known as the Royal Society of New Zealand) for 22 years. His political influence was underlined by his marriage in 1868 to Maria Georgiana Monro, daughter of the speaker of the House of Representatives, David Monro.

Hector managed the colony's premier scientific society – the New Zealand Institute (now known as the Royal Society of New Zealand) – for thirty-five years. He was the first manager of the Wellington Botanic Gardens on their opening in 1869, developing the gardens with the New Zealand Institute for 22 years. From 1885 he was chancellor of the University of New Zealand. He controlled virtually every aspect of state-funded science. He had close and, at times, tense relationships with other men of science, in particular Julius von Haast in Christchurch; e.g. (1871–74) over the "Sumner Cave" relics in Christchurch, the Moa and whether the early Moa-hunters were Moriori as Haast maintained.

At the end of his career he was criticised for failing to acquire Māori artefacts for the Colonial Museum and in 1891 for not adequately defending his departments from the new Liberal Government's funding cuts. In 1891 the Liberals replaced the conservative Continuous Ministry with which he had been associated. In 1902, for example, the ethnographer Elsdon Best wrote to Augustus Hamilton, the future director of the Colonial Museum, to state that Hector should be forced from office and that they should put a live man in his place.

=== Retirement ===
Hector retired in 1903, after four decades at the centre of organised science in New Zealand. He was president of the Royal Society of New Zealand between 1906 and 1907; preceded by Frederick Hutton and followed by George Malcolm Thomson.

He died in Lower Hutt, New Zealand, in 1907, and was buried at Taitā Cemetery.

== Family ==
Hector married Maria Georgiana Monro at Nelson on 30 December 1868, three years after moving to Wellington. She was the daughter of politician David Monro, who was at the time the Speaker of the House of Representatives. Her brother was Charles John Monro, who first introduced Rugby to New Zealand.

James and Georgiana build a house Ratanui in 1882, on the Western Hutt hills overlooking Petone. They had nine children, six boys and three girls: Barclay (1869–1964), Charles Monro (1871–1935), Constance Margart (1873–1949), David Carmichael (1874–1875), Douglas (1877–1903), Philip Landale (1878–1879), Lyell (1882–1908), Georgina (1884–1979) and Marjory (1886–1948). In 1875 the first four children were left in Nelson while their parents visited Britain; David, the youngest died of pneumonia. Charles (like his father) studied medicine at Edinburgh University and became a Lower Hutt GP. Douglas died in Canada of appendicitis while on holiday there with his father. In 1906 Constance married Lionel Saxby and Georgina married Richard Barton.

Hector corresponded with the botanist Joseph Hooker in London, and looked after two of Hooker's sons (Willy and Brian) when they came to New Zealand.

In 1937, several members of Hector's family donated 16 medals awarded to him during his career to the Dominion Museum, later to become Museum of New Zealand Te Papa Tongarewa.

== Honours ==
After the Canadian expedition, Hector was elected a Fellow of the Royal Society in June 1866. In 1877, he was awarded the Lyell Medal by the Geological Society of London, being the second recipient of this prestigious medal. In 1878 the Royal Society of New South Wales awarded him the Clarke Medal awarded to Global scientific achievement.

In 1875, he was appointed a Companion of the Order of St Michael and St George and in 1887 was appointed a Knight Commander of the same order.

The Geoscience Society of New Zealand commemorates his birthday, 16 March, as Hector Day.

== Eponymy ==
A number of things have been named after Hector, including:

- The Hector Memorial Medal awarded annually by the Royal Society of New Zealand for outstanding work in chemical, physical or mathematical and information sciences to a researcher in New Zealand.
- The library of the Museum of New Zealand Te Papa Tongarewa was called the Hector Library until 2001; it is now called Te Aka Matua Library & Information Centre. It consists of the merged collections of the Dominion Museum, the National Art Gallery, the Royal Society of New Zealand, and the Wellington Branch of the Royal Society of New Zealand. A portrait of Hector hangs just inside the door.
- The Hector Observatory, located in the Wellington Botanic Garden and later renamed the Dominion Observatory
- The James Hector Pinetum and Memorial Lookout in the Wellington Botanic Garden
- Mount Hector located in the southern Tararua Range
- Mount Hector located in Banff National Park
- Hector, West Coast
- The lost fossil of a massive ichthyosaur (potentially a Shastasaurid), discovered in New Zealand by Richard Lydekker was given the nickname Hector's Ichthyosaur

A number of species and subspecies have been named after Hector, including:

- The buff weka, Gallirallus australis hectori
- Hector's beaked whale, Mesoplodon hectori
- Hector's dolphin, Cephalorhynchus hectori
- a New Zealand land snail, Huonodon hectori
- a New Zealand lamp shell, Pachymagas hectori
- a genus of flowering plants belonging to the family Montiaceae, Hectorella

== See also ==
- Fiddle Peak
- Category:Taxa named by James Hector

== Note ==
Awards and achievements
Preceded by Laurent-Guillaume de Koninck	Clarke Medal; 1887	Succeeded by Julian Tenison Woods
