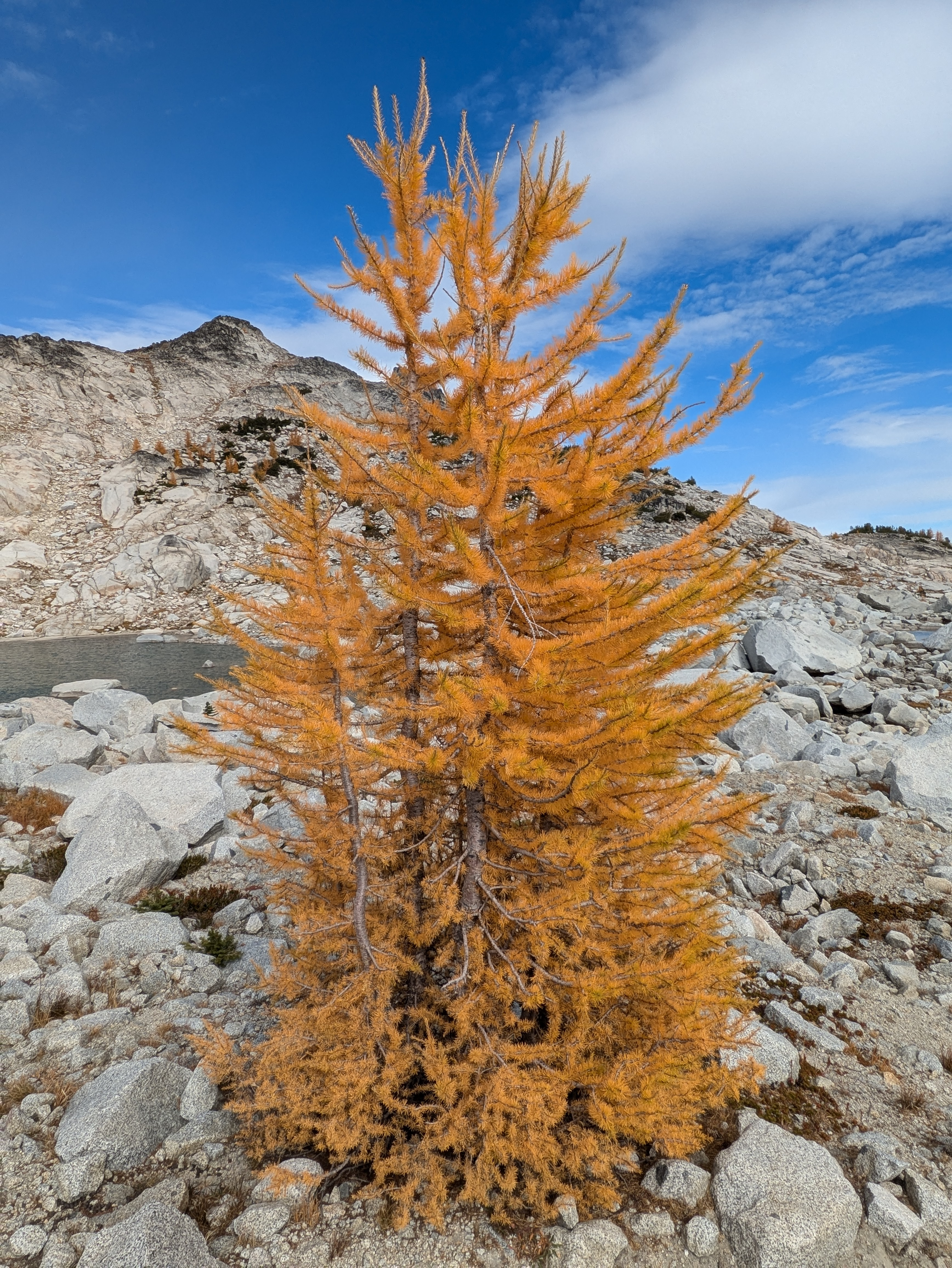

Conservation status
- Least Concern (IUCN 3.1)

- Secure (NatureServe)

Scientific classification
- Kingdom: Plantae
- Clade: Tracheophytes
- Clade: Gymnosperms
- Division: Pinophyta
- Class: Pinopsida
- Order: Pinales
- Family: Pinaceae
- Genus: Larix
- Species: L. lyallii

Binomial name
- Larix lyallii Parl.
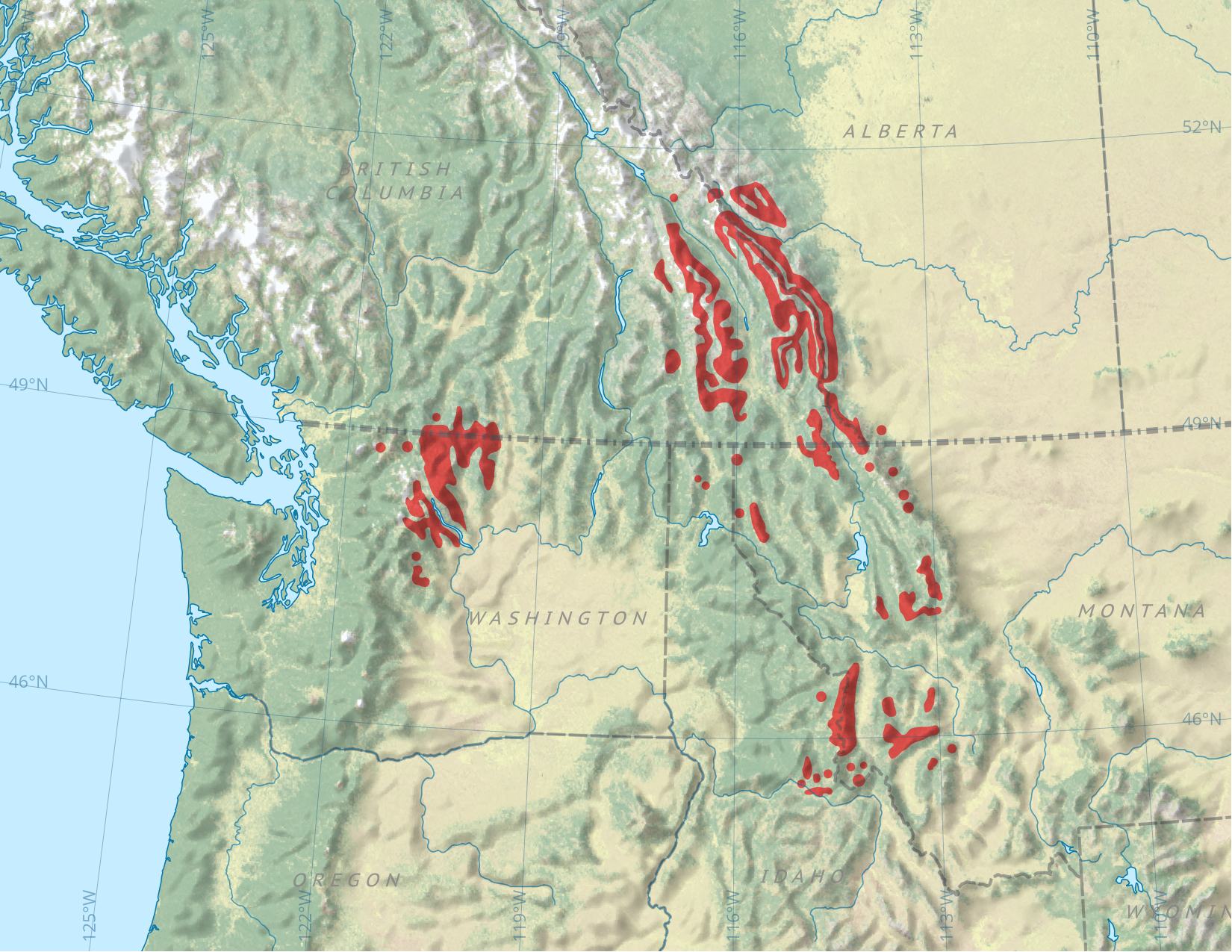
- Natural range of Larix lyallii

= Larix lyallii =

Plant species in the pine family

Larix lyallii, the subalpine larch or alpine larch, is a deciduous, coniferous tree native to northwestern North America. It lives at high elevations, from 1,500 to 2,900 meters (4,900 to 9,500 ft), in the Rocky Mountains of Idaho, Montana, British Columbia, and Alberta. There is a disjunct population in the Cascade Range of Washington.

Subalpine larch is hardy and can survive at low temperatures and on thin rocky soils, often being found near the tree line. It can grow in a variety of soils as long as the soil is moist but well drained. However, it is relatively shade intolerant.

David Lyall seems to have discovered the species between 1858 and 1861. John Bernhard Leiberg described it in 1900.

== Description ==
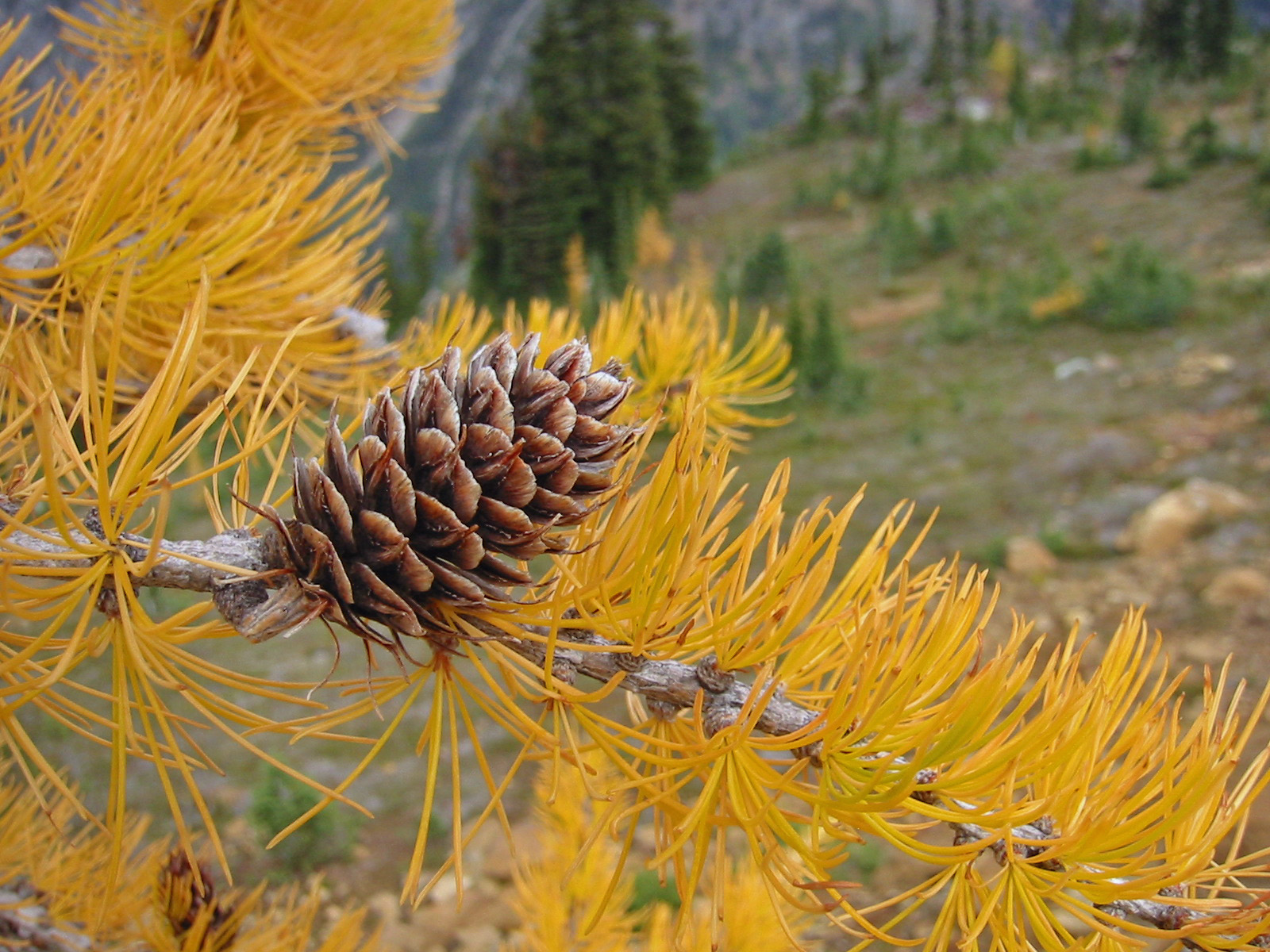
Fall foliage and cone

Larix lyallii is a small tree, growing from 10 to 25 meters (33 to 82 ft) tall and shorter at higher elevations. It has a straight trunk with a sparse and somewhat conical crown. The branches are horizontal, perpendicular to the trunk, irregularly spaced and twisted. The twigs are finely hairy. The needles are four-angled, 20 to 35 millimeters (3/4 to 1 1/2 in) long and crowded in groups of 30 to 40 on short spurs. They are pale blue-green and deciduous, turning golden yellow in autumn.

The seed cones, 2.5 to 4 centimeters (1 to 1 1/2 in) long, are red-purple when young but become dark brown with age. They have thin scales and narrow bracts that extend over the scales. The pollen and seed cones become active in early summer. The bark is about 2.5 cm thin and turns from yellow-gray to dark red-brown with age. It also becomes deeply furrowed into small, scaly plates.

== Uses ==
The bark contains tannin and the wood is strong, heavy, and durable.
