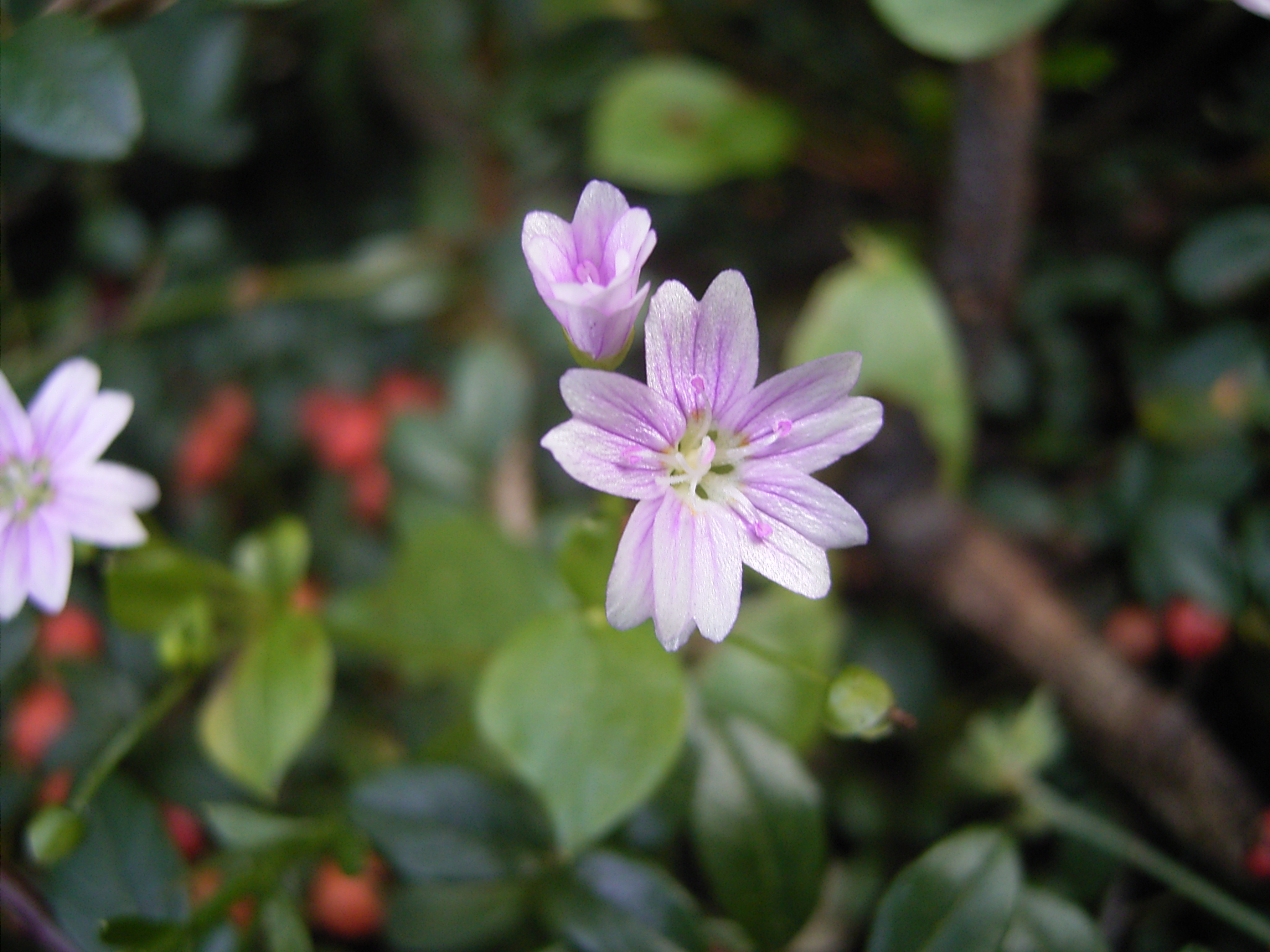
- Claytonia sibirica

Scientific classification
- Kingdom: Plantae
- Clade: Tracheophytes
- Clade: Angiosperms
- Clade: Eudicots
- Order: Caryophyllales
- Family: Montiaceae; Raf.

Genera
- See text

= Montiaceae =

Family of flowering plants

Montiaceae are a family of flowering plants, with about 17 genera and about 230 known species, ranging from small herbaceous plants to shrubs. The family has a cosmopolitan distribution.

The family Montiaceae was newly adopted in the APG III system and includes members of the Caryophyllales formerly listed in Portulacaceae. It is known by the common names of spring beauty family or the montia family.

== Genera ==
The following genera are accepted:

- Calandrinia Kunth
- Calyptridium Nutt.
- Cistanthe Spach
- Claytonia L.
- Erocallis Rydb.
- Hectorella Hook.f.
- Lenzia Phil.
- Lewisia Pursh
- Lewisiopsis Govaerts
- Lyallia Hook.f.
- Montia L.
- Montiopsis Kuntze
- Parakeelya Hershk.
- Phemeranthus Raf.
- Philippiamra Kuntze
- Schreiteria Carolin
- Thingia Hershk.
