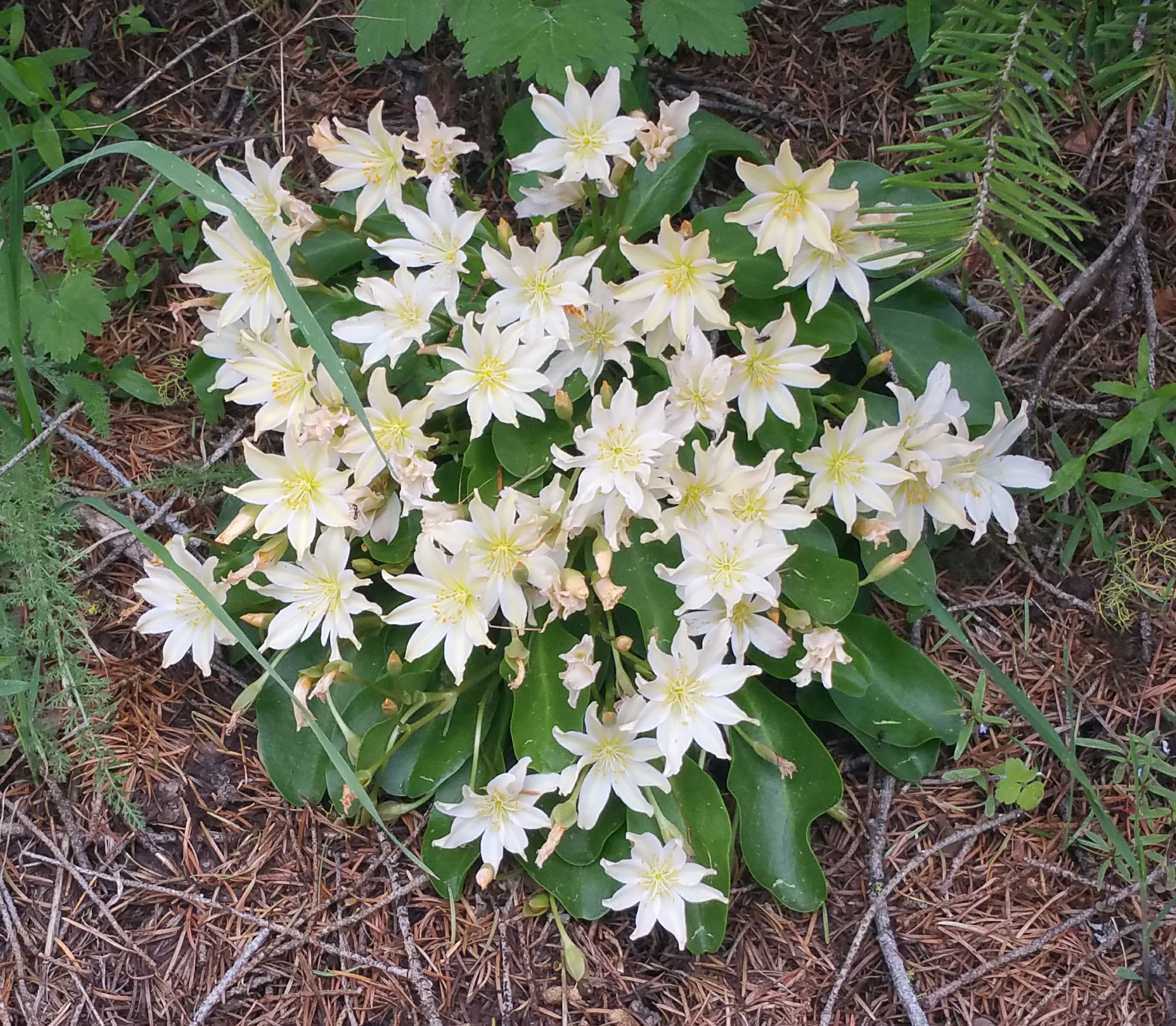

Scientific classification
- Kingdom: Plantae
- Clade: Tracheophytes
- Clade: Angiosperms
- Clade: Eudicots
- Order: Caryophyllales
- Family: Montiaceae
- Genus: Lewisiopsis; Govaerts
- Species: L. tweedyi

Binomial name
- Lewisiopsis tweedyi (A.Gray) Govaerts

Synonyms
- Lewisia tweedyi Cistanthe tweedyi Calandrinia tweedyi

= Lewisiopsis =

Lewisiopsis tweedyi

Genus of flowering plants

Lewisiopsis tweedyi is a flowering plant and sole species in genus Lewisiopsis. The species, formerly known as Cistanthe tweedyi and Lewisia tweedyi, is now classified in the family Montiaceae. The plant is known by the common names Tweedy's pussypaws, Tweedy's lewisia, or Tweedy's bitterroot. It is endemic to western North America in north-central Washington and adjacent British Columbia. It commonly grows on well-drained slopes often on rocky slopes or in rock crevices from low elevation ponderosa pine sites up to the drier part of the Grand Fir zone of the North Cascades. The flowers usually have a coral, apricot, or pink color.

== Etymology ==
The genus name of Lewisiopsis is in honour of Meriwether Lewis (1774–1809), who was an American explorer, soldier, politician, and public administrator, best known for his role as the leader of the Lewis and Clark Expedition.

The Latin specific epithet tweedyi honours Frank Tweedy, the 19th century American topographer.

The genus was circumscribed by Rafaël Herman Anna Govaerts in World Checkl. Seed Pl. vol.3 (Edition 1) on page 21 in 1999.

== Morphology ==
The root of Lewisiopsis is reddish, fleshy, and extremely thick. The root can grow to be two to three feet long although some are much shorter.

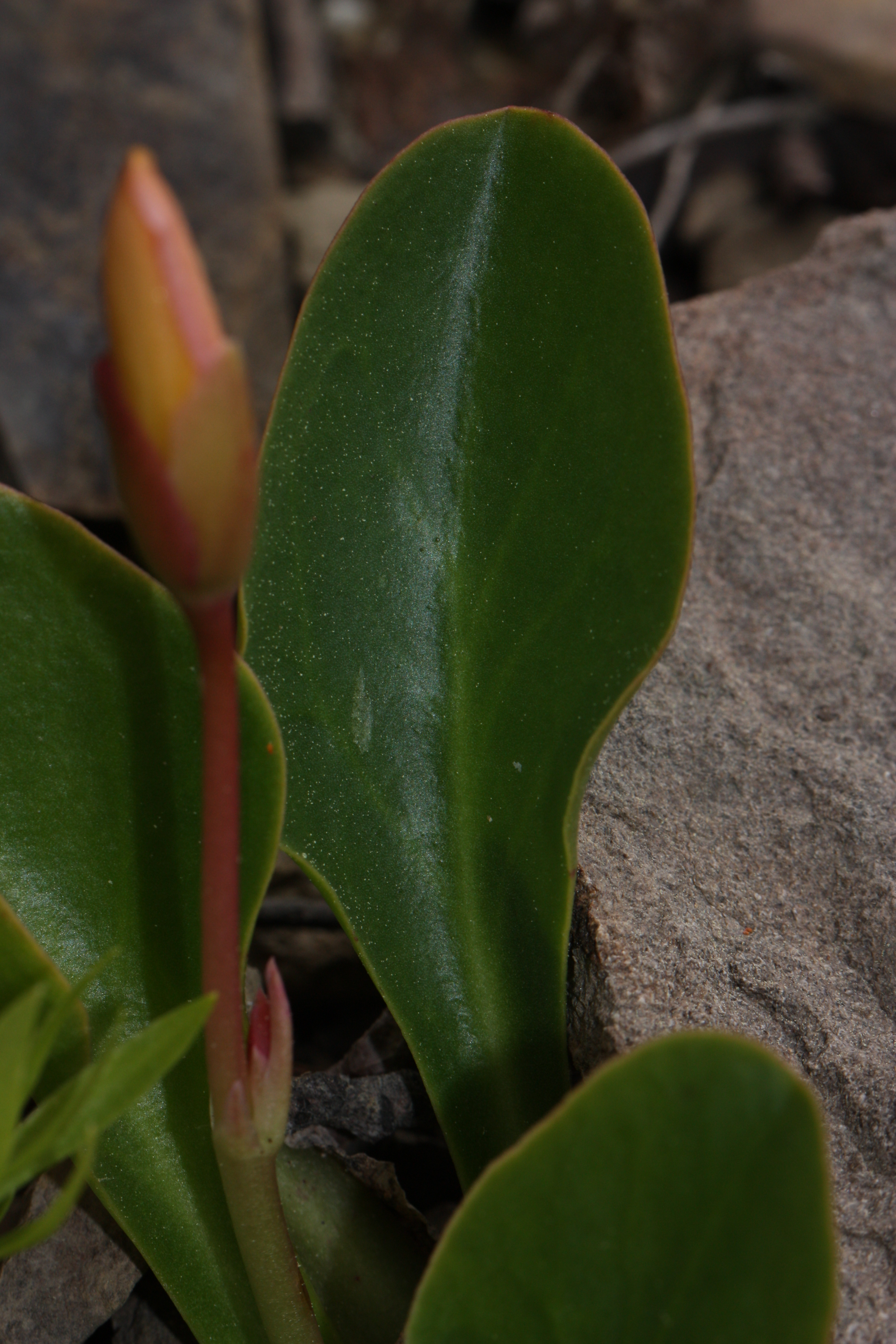
Basal leaves are entire, leathery and broadly ovate. One or two bract-like cauline leaves (not shown) may be present, also.

There are numerous, evergreen, smooth, succulent and light green leaves. The margins on the leaves are up to 1 foot (30 cm) long including the stems. The blades of the leaves are sometimes shallowly notched at the apex and are up to 2 inches (5 cm) wide and are ovate. The petioles are 3/8 inch (10 mm) wide and are as long as the blades. The petioles appear flattened and the edges are turned upward forming a shallow groove at the base. The underside of the stem is ridged at the base. A mature plant is typically 8 inches (20 cm) in diameter.

== Flowers and fruit ==
The inflorescence is an open, terminal raceme with small bracts. Each flower has two sepals and eight to twelve broad petals, a cup-shaped blossom, up to 3 inches (7.6 cm) across. Petals are cream becoming apricot or pink near the tips. As they age, they close and cling together being replaced by the lower petals. The 12 to 25 stamens are about half as long as the petals. The single style terminates in a three to eight-parted stigma. The fruit is a small egg-shaped one-celled capsule that contains up to 12 to 20 seeds.

Lewisiopsis flowers in May, June, and July, depending on elevation.

== Distribution ==
Lewisiopsis is endemic to the Wenatchee Mountains and Methow Valley of Washington State, and in Manning Park of British Columbia. Populations may be found near Mount Stuart, Tumwater Canyon, Chumstick Creek, as well as at the top of high ridges. It is one of the regions showiest herbaceous plants. It has a limited geographic range but is quite common within that area.

== Habitat and ecology ==
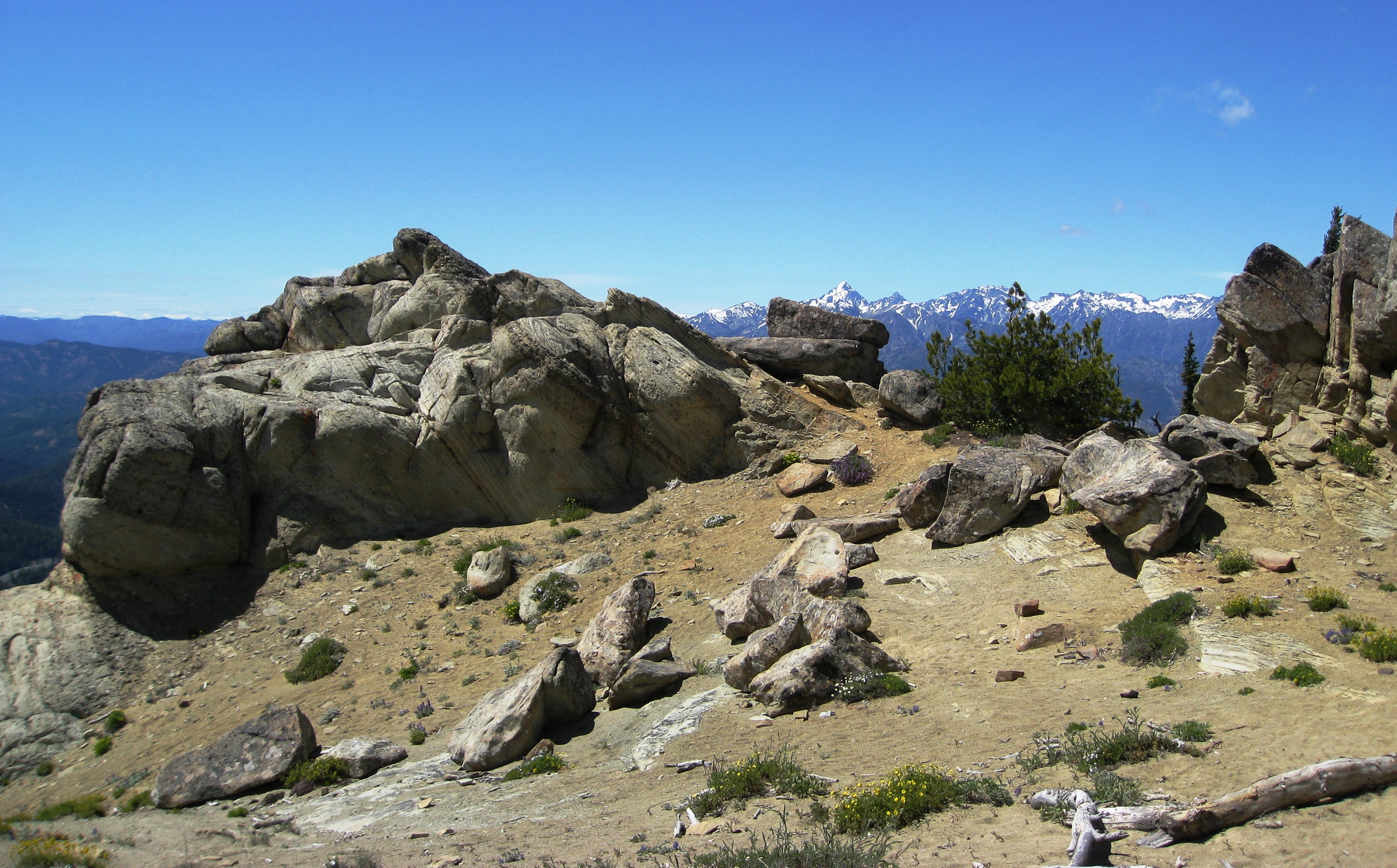
The open habitat of higher elevation occurrences of Lewisiopsis

Lewisiopsis is perennial. It is typically found at elevation of 1,500 to 4,500 feet (460 to 1,370 m). It hides from the sun at low elevations and is found in the shade. As the elevations increase, the plant reveals itself to the sun. It can live up to temperatures of 100 °F (38 °C) in the summer time. In its native environment, Lewisiopsis can handle temperature below 30 °F (−1 °C) degrees, although the flowers may die.

== Cultivation ==
The nursery trade has taken some interest in cultivating Lewisiopsis because it is perennial, has showy blooms and it is drought tolerant. In wet climates, if the root crown of the plant gets wet, it will die causing the death of the entire plant. If cultured, perfect drainage is required for survival. The use of broken or crushed rock mixed with humus will keep the plant alive. Placing a small rock under the crowns can prevent the crown from getting wet. The plant will not die of thirst because the leathery leaves and roots will store enough water.

This plant has gained the Royal Horticultural Society's Award of Garden Merit.
