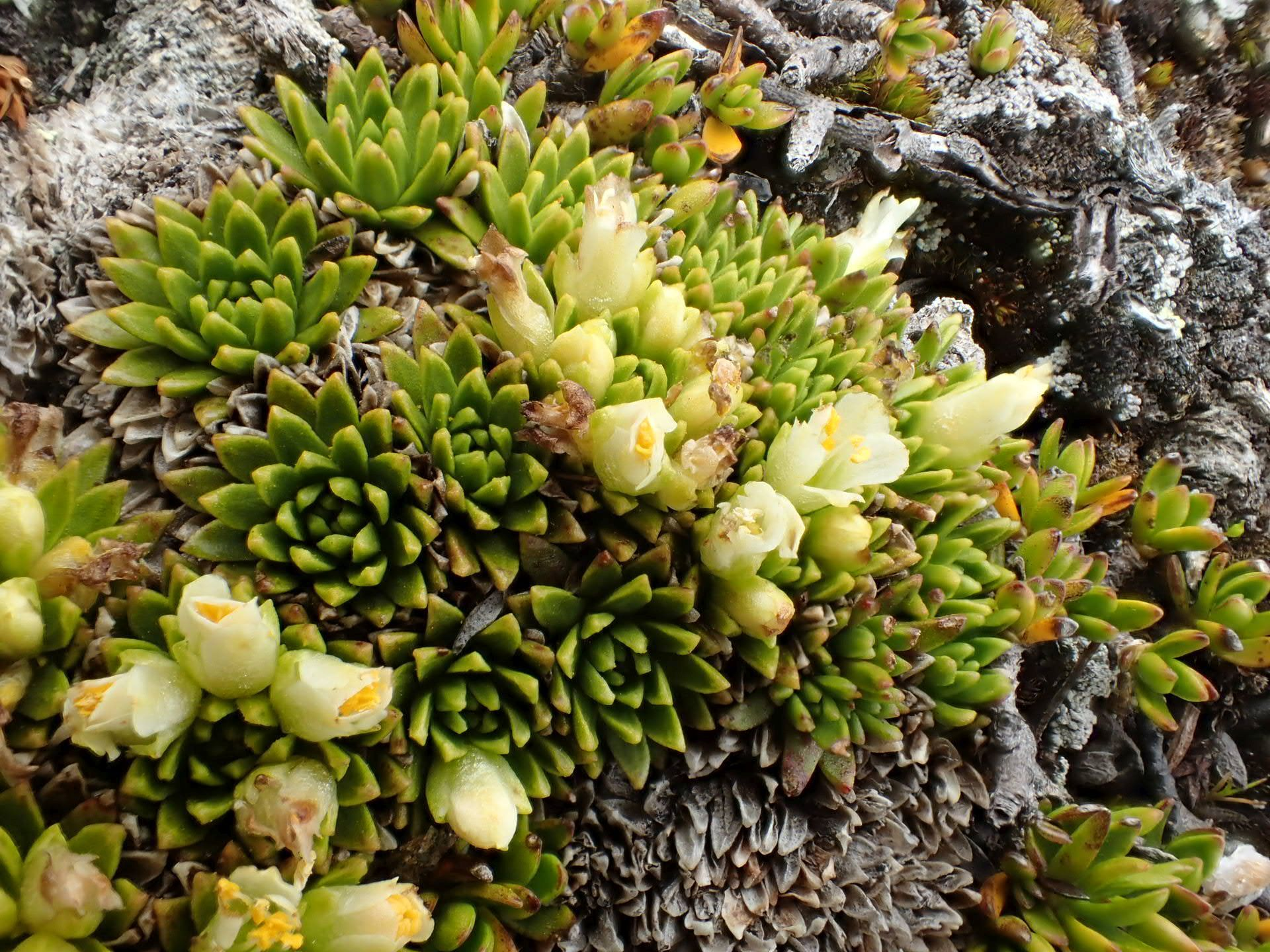

Scientific classification
- Kingdom: Plantae
- Clade: Tracheophytes
- Clade: Angiosperms
- Clade: Eudicots
- Order: Caryophyllales
- Family: Montiaceae
- Genus: Hectorella; Hook.f.
- Species: H. caespitosa

Binomial name
- Hectorella caespitosa Hook.f.

Synonyms
- Hectorella elongata Buchanan; Lyallia caespitosa (Hook.f.) Nyananyo & Heywood

= Hectorella =

Hectorella caespitosa

Genus of plants

Hectorella is a genus of flowering plants belonging to the family Montiaceae. It is monotypic, being represented by the single species Hectorella caespitosa. It is native to New Zealand.

The genus name of Hectorella is in honour of James Hector (1834–1907), a Scottish-New Zealand geologist, naturalist and surgeon. The Latin specific epithet of caespitosa refers to caespitose meaning tufted or turf-like, from caespes or Cf. caespititius. Hectorella caespitosa was first described and published in Handb. N. Zeal. Fl. Vol.1 on page 27 in 1864.
