= Schreiteria macrocarpa =

Scientific classification
- Kingdom: Plantae
- Clade: Tracheophytes
- Clade: Angiosperms
- Clade: Eudicots
- Order: Caryophyllales
- Family: Montiaceae
- Genus: Schreiteria; Carolin (1985)
- Species: S. macrocarpa

Binomial name
- Schreiteria macrocarpa (Speg.) Carolin (1985)

Synonyms
- Calandrinia macrocarpa Speg. (1899)

Species of flowering plant

Schreiteria is a monotypic genus of flowering plants belonging to the family Montiaceae. It is represented by the single species of Schreiteria macrocarpa (Speg.) Carolin. It is native to north-western Argentina.

== Description ==
It is a perennial herb with tuberous roots. The flowers are in cymes. The bracts and sepals are persistent (remaining to the maturity of fruit) but the bracts are deciduous. The pollen is polyrugate (meaning that the pollen has more than one furrow,). The seed capsule is up to 40 mm (2 in) long and 3 valved. The seeds are compressed and irregularly papillate (covered in papilla). It has an embryo that almost encircles the perisperm.

== Taxonomy ==
The genus name of Schreiteria is in honour of Carlos Rodolfo Schreiter (1877–1942), a German-Argentinian botanist and student of Miguel Lillo. The Latin specific epithet of macrocarpa meaning with large fruit, from Greek 'makros' meaning large and 'karpos' meaning fruit. Both the genus and the sole species were first described and published in Parodiana Vol.3 on page 330 in 1985.

The genus is recognized by the United States Department of Agriculture and the Agricultural Research Service, but they do not list any known species.
