= Philippiamra =

Scientific classification
- Kingdom: Plantae
- Clade: Tracheophytes
- Clade: Angiosperms
- Clade: Eudicots
- Clade: Superasterids
- Order: Caryophyllales
- Family: Montiaceae
- Genus: Philippiamra; Kuntze

Synonyms
- Silvaea Phil. nom. illeg.

Genus of plant

Philippiamra is a genus of flowering plants in the spring beauty family Montiaceae. Its species are found in Peru, Chile, and Argentina. Originally described in 1891, it was resurrected during a 2025 taxonomic revision of the Montiaceae.

== Species ==
The following species are accepted:

- Philippiamra amarantoides (Phil.) Kuntze
- Philippiamra arancioana (Peralta) Hershk.
- Philippiamra calycina (Phil.) Hershk.
- Philippiamra celosioides (Phil.) Kuntze
- Philippiamra corrigioloides (Phil.) Kuntze
- Philippiamra densiflora (Barnéoud) Hershk.
- Philippiamra minuscula (Añon) Hershk.
- Philippiamra salsoloides (Barnéoud) Hershk.
