= Lenzia chamaepitys =

Scientific classification
- Kingdom: Plantae
- Clade: Tracheophytes
- Clade: Angiosperms
- Clade: Eudicots
- Order: Caryophyllales
- Family: Montiaceae
- Genus: Lenzia; Phil.
- Species: L. chamaepitys

Binomial name
- Lenzia chamaepitys Phil.

Synonyms
- Lenzia vernonioides Sch.Bip. ex Phil.

Species of plant

Lenzia is a monotypic genus of flowering plants belonging to the family Montiaceae. It only contains one known species, Lenzia chamaepitys.

Its native range is southern South America and it is found in Argentina and Chile.

The genus name of Lenzia is in honour of Harald Othmar Lenz (1798–1870), a German teacher and naturalist in Thuringia and also historian of science, as well as a specialist in fungi and sponges. The Latin specific epithet of chamaepitys refers the Ancient Greek words χαμαί khamaí latinized into chamae meaning "on the ground, to the ground/earth", and also πιτυς pitys meaning "pine", from resemblance of the foliage to that of pine trees. Both genus and species were first described and published in Linnaea Vol.33 on page 222 in 1864.
