= David Lyall =

Scottish botanist

David Lyall (1817–1895) MD, RN, FLS, was a Scottish botanist who explored Antarctica, New Zealand, the Arctic and North America and was a lifelong friend of Sir Joseph Hooker. He was born in Auchenblae, Kincardineshire, Scotland on 1 June 1817.

He graduated in medicine from Aberdeen, having previously been admitted a Licentiate of the Royal College of Surgeons of Edinburgh. Lyall entered the Royal Navy in 1839 and was immediately appointed, on 6 June, as assistant surgeon on HMS Terror, under Captain Francis Crozier (1796–1848), one of the two ships forming Sir James Clark Ross's Expedition to the Antarctic. The ships were the first to penetrate the Antarctic pack ice and to confirm the existence of the great southern continent. Hooker and Lyall made good use of their time botanizing on Kerguelen Island. Lyall had the rare distinction of having a whole genus, Lyallia, named after him, by Hooker.

Hooker noted in his Flora Antarctica:

Among his many important botanical discoveries in this survey was that of the monarch of all buttercups, the gigantic white-flowered Ranunculus lyallii, the only known species with peltate leaves, the 'water-lily' of the New Zealand shepherds.--Joseph Dalton Hooker (1895) 33 Journal of Botany, p. 209.

== See also ==
- European and American voyages of scientific exploration

== Sources ==
Lyall, Andrew; "David Lyall (1817–1895): Botanical explorer of Antarctica, New Zealand, the Arctic and North America" (2010) 26:2 The Linnean pp. 23–48, Linnean Society of London (July 2010).
