= Butterweed =

Butterweed is a common name for several plants and may refer to:

- Conyza, a genus native to eastern Asia and North America
- Packera glabella, a species native to central and southeastern North America
- Packera layneae, a species native to California
- Packera werneriifolia, a species native to the western United States
- Senecio ampullaceus, a species native to Texas
- Senecio flaccidus, a species native to central and southwest North America
- Senecio mohavensis, a specie native to the southwestern United States and northwestern Mexico
- Senecio triangularis, a species native to temperate regions of North America
