= Pine Hill Ecological Reserve =

California nature reserve

- IUCN category Ia (strict nature reserve)
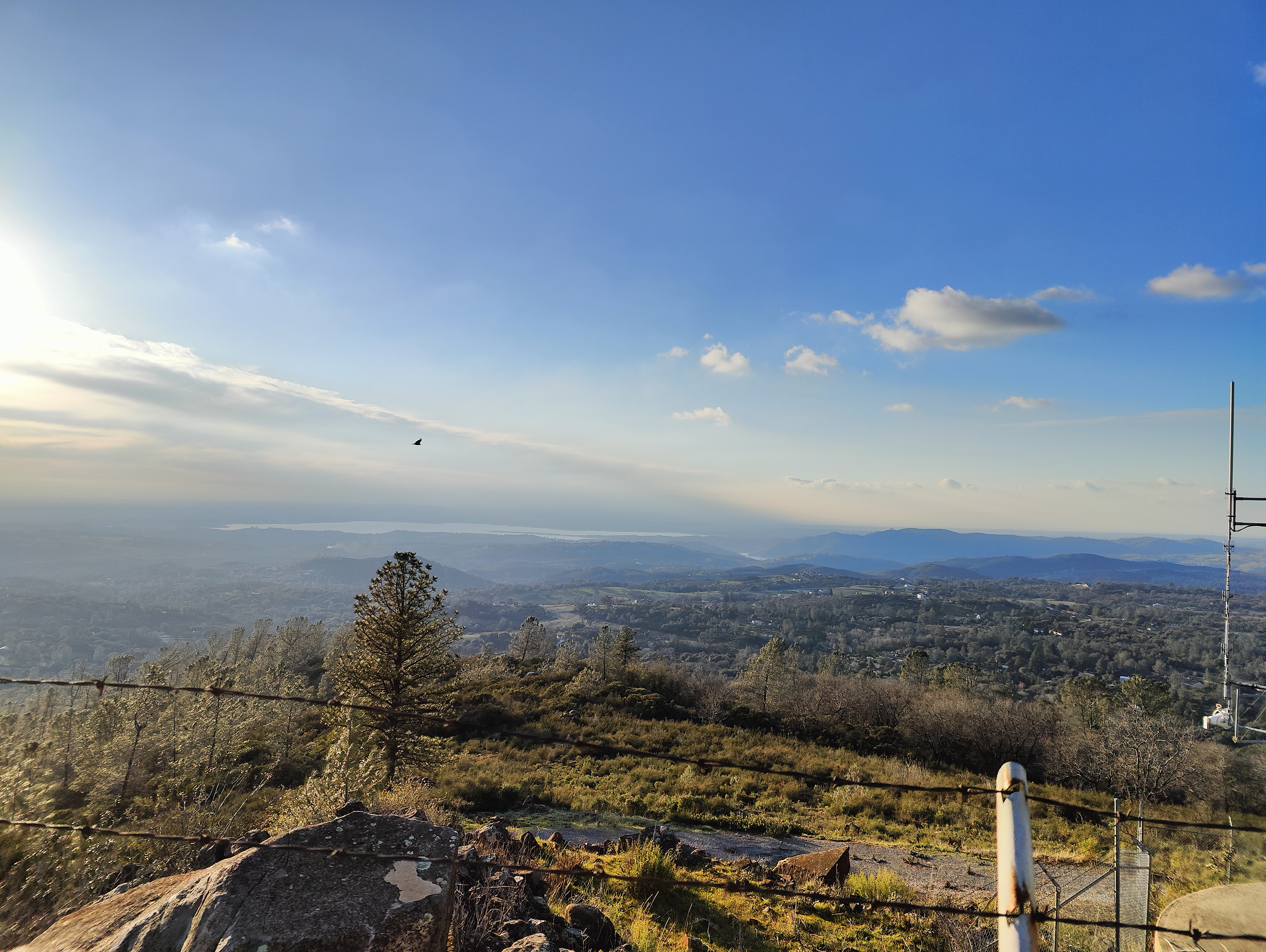
- View from the Summit of Pine Hill
- Interactive map of Pine Hill Ecological Reserve
- Location: El Dorado County, California
- Nearest city: Cameron Park, California
- Coordinates: 38°43′10″N 120°59′26″W
- Area: 403 acres (163 ha)
- Established: 1979
- Governing body: California Department of Fish and Wildlife

Pine Hill Ecological Reserve is a nature reserve of 403 acres (1.63 km^{2}) located due east of Folsom Lake in the Sierra Nevada foothills, in El Dorado County, California. The reserve was established in 1979, and is managed by the Bureau of Land Management.

The Pine Hill Ecological Reserve is one unit of the much larger Pine Hill Preserve system that consists of five separate units of varying size that total more than 4,000 acres (16 km^{2}) and protects eight rare plants and their gabbro soil habitat. It is jointly managed by several local, state and federal agencies through a Cooperative Management Agreement.

== Geography ==
The Preserve is formed by five non-contiguous units (of which the ecological reserve is the centrally located, state-owned unit), that stretch over a 30,000-acre (120 km^{2}) area of gabbro soil. The gabbro soil dates from 175 million years ago during the late Jurassic Period. The dominant soils are classified as sandy loams of the Rescue Soil Series. These soils are well drained, with a high iron and magnesium content and a characteristic red color. The other units in the Preserve are: Cameron Park, Martel Creek, Penny Lane and Salmon Falls.

Access is restricted to guided tours because of the rarity of the plants, and that the reserve is almost completely surrounded by private property. The reserve highlights the plant community that grow on soil derived from gabbro bedrock. Naturalist-led tours are offered by the Bureau of Land Management and are limited to 30 people.

The landscape of the reserve unit includes the summit of Pine Hill (2,031 feet or 619 metres) with prominent ridgelines heading northeast, west, and south. The summit has a fire lookout operated by the California Department of Forestry (CDF). A gated, closed road leads to the summit.

Waterways in the general area include a portion of the South Fork American River, along with perennial and intermittent tributary streams such as Weber, Martel and Sweetwater Creeks.

== History ==
Preservation efforts started in 1977, when surplus lands managed by the California Department of Forestry were to be disposed of in the Pine Hill area. Environmental groups joined to urge the state to set aside significant natural areas from development and by 1979, the summit of Pine Hill became a state-owned ecological reserve of 320 acres (1.3 km^{2}). In 1991, 40 acres (160,000 m^{2}) were added by the Bureau of Land Management (BLM), and in 2002 and 2004, BLM and the county of El Dorado added another 43 acres (170,000 m^{2}).

Botanists believed the rare plants were safe on the state-owned property until the state bulldozed a firebreak across the summit in the mid-1970s. Stands of Pine Hill flannelbush and the El Dorado bedstraw were damaged.

Beginning in 1977, the California Native Plant Society became aware of CDF's intention to dispose of the 300-acre (1.2 km^{2}) property surrounding the fire lookout station. Correspondence from CDF to the state's Department of General Services listed properties, including Pine Hill, as surplus. The surplus parcels list then went through the legislative process where it was determined that the properties were indeed surplus to the state's needs. The Society united with other environmental groups to encourage the state government to begin a coordinated effort to preserve significant natural areas. From 1978 to 1979, a multi-constituent committee, including the California Native Plant Society, Audubon Society, and California Resources Agency, met to set up a significant natural area for Pine Hill.

In May 1979, the California Fish and Game Commission accepted the property and a transfer was made from the Department of Forestry to the Department of Fish and Game.

=== County actions ===
The California Native Plant Society together with the Department of Fish and Game provided El Dorado County with information about the various species and the need for protection in 1989. Housing construction and the ensuing habitat fragmentation, road construction and maintenance, herbicide spraying, change in fire frequency, off-road vehicle use, illegal dumping, horse overgrazing, competition from invasive non-native vegetation, and mining activities imperil these species. The county Board of Supervisors approved funding of a field survey and study by the private company, EIP Associates in early 1991. The final report, titled Preserve Sites and Preservation Strategies for Rare Plant Species in Western El Dorado County was completed in November 1991.

In 1992, The Board of Supervisors had an advisory committee formed, with members from the development community, county, state and federal agencies, and environmental groups, including the American River Conservancy. The goal of the El Dorado County Rare Plant Advisory Committee was to identify feasible preserve sites, funding mechanisms, and management strategies for these future preserves using information from the EIP report and other sources. The Committee presented the final report to the County in February, 1993. The report recommended setting aside more than 3,000 acres (12 km^{2}) in five separate areas and two small, satellite areas. The preserve sites were identified because they would protect more than one population of each species, protect against catastrophic loss at any one site, maintain genetic diversity within the rare plant species, and preserve a representation of the geographic range, diversity of plant associations, and other potentially important site-specific conditions associated with the rare plants. The Board of Supervisors approved, in concept, four of the preserves and directed that the Salmon Falls, Martell Creek, Pine Hill and Penny Lane preserve units be included in the General Plan update. The Board did not approve the Cameron Park southern preserve site at that time. The El Dorado County General Plan was adopted by the Board in January, 1996 and amended (Resolution 57–98) in March, 1998 to include the Cameron Park unit.

=== Cooperative Management Agreement ===
In 2001, a Cooperative Management Agreement (CMA) for the Pine Hill Preserve was signed by three federal agencies (Bureau of Land Management, US Fish and Wildlife Service, and US Bureau of Reclamation), two state agencies (California Department of Fish and Game and California Department of Forestry and Fire Protection), El Dorado County, El Dorado Irrigation District, and the American River Conservancy. A separate agreement between El Dorado County and the Bureau of Land Management created funding for a preserve manager. The Cooperative Management Agreement sets the amount of participation for each agency. El Dorado County is tasked with several actions, one of which is to create and implement an INRMP-Integrated Natural Resources Management Plan. The American River Conservancy's participation includes maintaining property acquisition summary records on behalf of all the member agencies.

== Flora ==
There are three main vegetation types—grassland, woodland, and chaparral. The chaparral type is known as Northern Mixed Chaparral (NMC) or gabbroic NMC, of the California interior chaparral and woodlands ecoregion, and is the most common occurring vegetation within the Preserve. Plant species of the chaparral type include chamise (Adenostoma fasciculatum), white leaf Manzanita (Arctostaphylos viscida), toyon (Heteromeles arbutifolia), California redbud (Cercis occidentalis), poison oak (Toxicodendron diversilobum), different species of Ceanothus, and California coffeeberry (Frangula californica) (syn: Rhamnus californica).

The western portion of El Dorado County has almost 10% (740 species) of California's native plants growing here, making the site nationally significant for species diversity.

Four rare plants are endemic and known to exist only in the Pine Hill area and nowhere else. Five species, described below, are listed as threatened species or endangered species under both the state and federal endangered species acts.

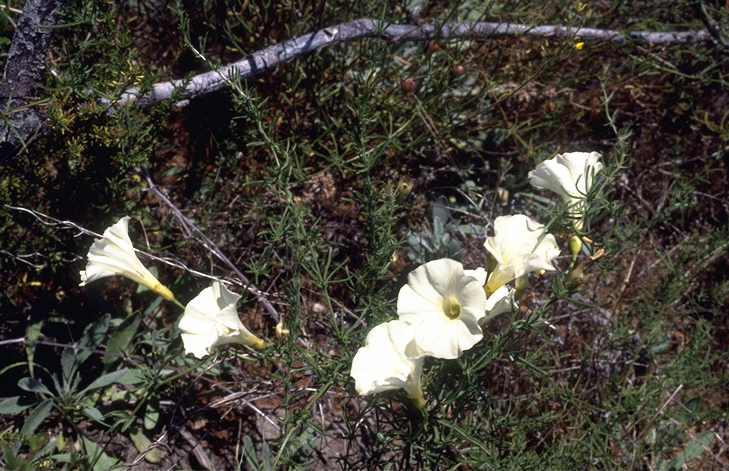
Stebbins' morning glory

=== Stebbins' morning glory ===
Stebbins' morning glory (Calystegia stebbinsii) is State listed as endangered since 1981 and federally listed as endangered since 1996. There are four unique observations in Nevada County and fifteen in El Dorado County. The plant is a leafy perennial herb of the morning glory family (Convolvulaceae). Stebbins' morning glory looks similar to the common morning glory, the difference is the leaf shape. Flowers are white and bloom in spring. Named after G. Ledyard Stebbins, who collected a type specimen in 1970.

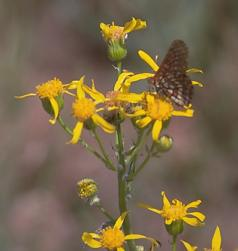
Layne's butterweed

=== Layne's butterweed ===
Layne's butterweed (Packera layneae) (syn: Senecio layneae, Layne's ragweed) has been State listed as rare since 1979 and federally listed as threatened since 1996. A perennial herb of the aster family (Asteraceae), it has yellow flowers and blooms from April to August. Besides El Dorado County, it can also be found in Yuba, Tuolumne and Butte counties. It is found in all the units of the Preserve in rocky, open interior chaparral and woodland areas.

It was first collected under the name Senecio layneae by Kate Layne-Curran near Sweetwater Creek of El Dorado County in May 1883. It is now believed that the Sweetwater Creek population has been extirpated by the inundation of Folsom Lake.

=== Pine Hill flannelbush ===
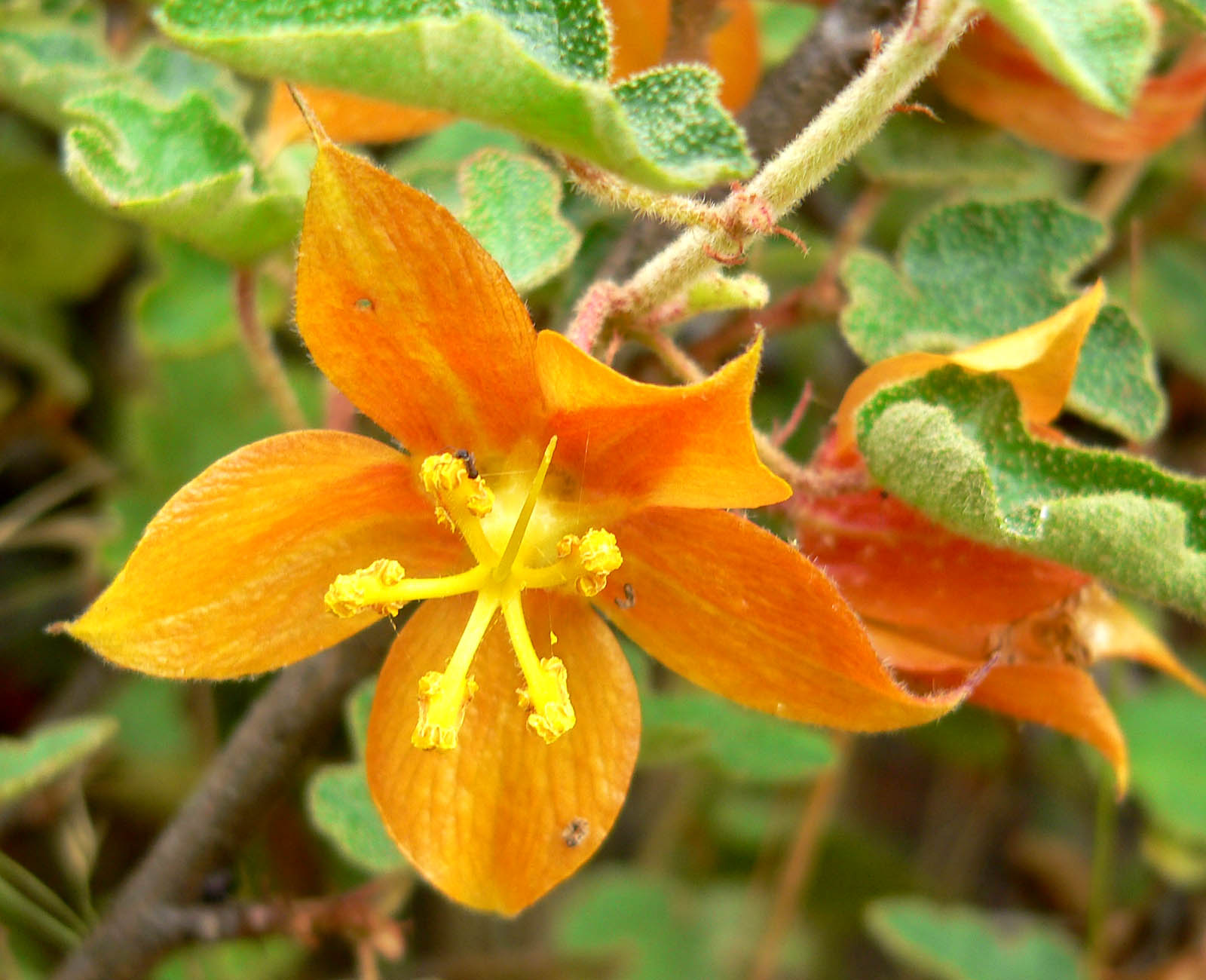
Flower of Pine Hill flannelbush (Fremontodendron decumbens)

Pine Hill flannelbush (Fremontodendron decumbens), formerly Fremontodendron californicum ssp. decumbens, has been State listed as rare since 1979 and federally listed as endangered since 1996. It is a low-growing shrub of the cacao family (Sterculiaceae), with red-orange flowers that bloom April through July. It is possibly a close relative to the dwarf flannelbush species found in Butte, Nevada, and Yuba Counties in the Sierras, but ongoing studies have yet to determine to what degree. The species was first collected by Beecher Crampton in 1956.

The Pine Hill flannelbush is endemic (grows nowhere else) to Pine Hill area. Total species population is estimated at 2,000, which makes the flannelbush one of the rarest plants in California.

=== El Dorado bedstraw ===
El Dorado bedstraw (Galium californicum ssp. sierrae) has been State listed as rare since 1979 and federally listed as endangered since 1996. Endemic to El Dorado County, it is low-growing perennial herb of the coffee family (Rubiaceae) with pale-yellow flowers blooming in May and June. It is distinguished from other Galium subspecies by the very narrow leaf shape. The species was first described by Dempster and Stebbins in 1968.

=== Pine Hill ceanothus (Ceanothus roderickii) ===
Pine Hill ceanothus (Ceanothus roderickii) has been State listed as rare since 1982, federally listed as endangered since 1996.

A low-growing shrub of the buckthorn family (Rhamnaceae) that is endemic to the Pine Hill area. Flowers are small, white clusters with a faint blue or pink tint, blooming period is April to June. Fruit is a small capsule that is globe-shaped and horned. The species is named for Wayne Roderick, who first realized its horticultural value as an endemic shrub.

=== Other rare plants ===
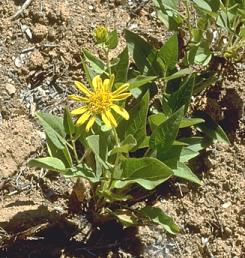
El Dorado mule ears (Wyethia reticulata)

El Dorado mule ears (Wyethia reticulata), Red Hills soaproot (Chlorogalum grandiflorum) and the Bisbee Peak rush-rose (Helianthemum suffrutescens) are not on the state or federal lists, but are a "species of concern" (or "sensitive"), which is a species that may not meet the Endangered Species Act criteria for listing, but have issues such as locally rare, newly discovered, or not enough information about the plant.

- El Dorado mule ears (Wyethia reticulata) is native to the Pine Hill area and spreads by underground root sprouts (clonal). Some parent plants may be several hundred years old.
- Red Hills soaproot (Chlorogalum grandiflorum) is also found in the Red Hills area of Tuolumne County, is a perennial herb and blooms in June with flowers opening at dusk and closing at morning. It grows in chaparral on serpentine and gabbro soils, and also in ponderosa pine woodland.
- Bisbee Peak rush-rose (Helianthemum suffrutescens) is a low-growing evergreen shrub with yellow flowers, and flat leaves covered with soft, very dense white hairs. Besides El Dorado County, it is found in Amador, Calaveras, Tuolumne, Mariposa, and Sacramento counties and looks very similar to the common rush-rose (Helianthemum scoparium). It is a species of concern because more information is needed about this plant.

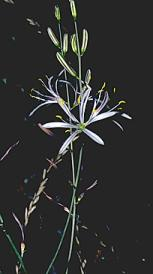
Red Hills soaproot

== Fauna ==
Wildlife in the area include coyote, black-tailed jackrabbit, black-tailed deer, mountain lion, California ground squirrel, and American black bear. Bird species include red-winged blackbird, great egret, red-tailed hawk, and valley quail. Some of the reptiles in the Pine Hill Preserve are western rattlesnake, California whipsnake, and the California horned lizard.

== See also ==
- List of plants of the Sierra Nevada (U.S.)
- List of California native plants
- Flora of the Sierra Nevada (United States)
- California Native Plant Society
- Nature reserves in California
