= Red Hills (Tuolumne County) =

Mountain range in California, United States

- Location within California

Highest point
- Elevation: 1,750 ft (530 m)

Geography
- Country: United States
- State: California
- County: Tuolumne
- Range coordinates: 37°50′25.740″N 120°27′28.707″W
- Topo map: USGS Chinese Camp

The Red Hills are a mountain range in Tuolumne County, California. Elevations within the Red Hills vary between 750 and 1,750 feet (230 and 530 m) above sea level. Slopes of the hills themselves vary from about 30% to 75%.

In 1937 Paramount filmed on location at the Red Hills area the motion picture North of the Rio Grande (1937) starring William Boyd as 'Hopalong Cassidy'. The studio sent a Hetch Hetchy railroad locomotive No.30 to roll through the Red Hills scenic landscape.

== Red Hills Area of Critical Environmental Concern ==
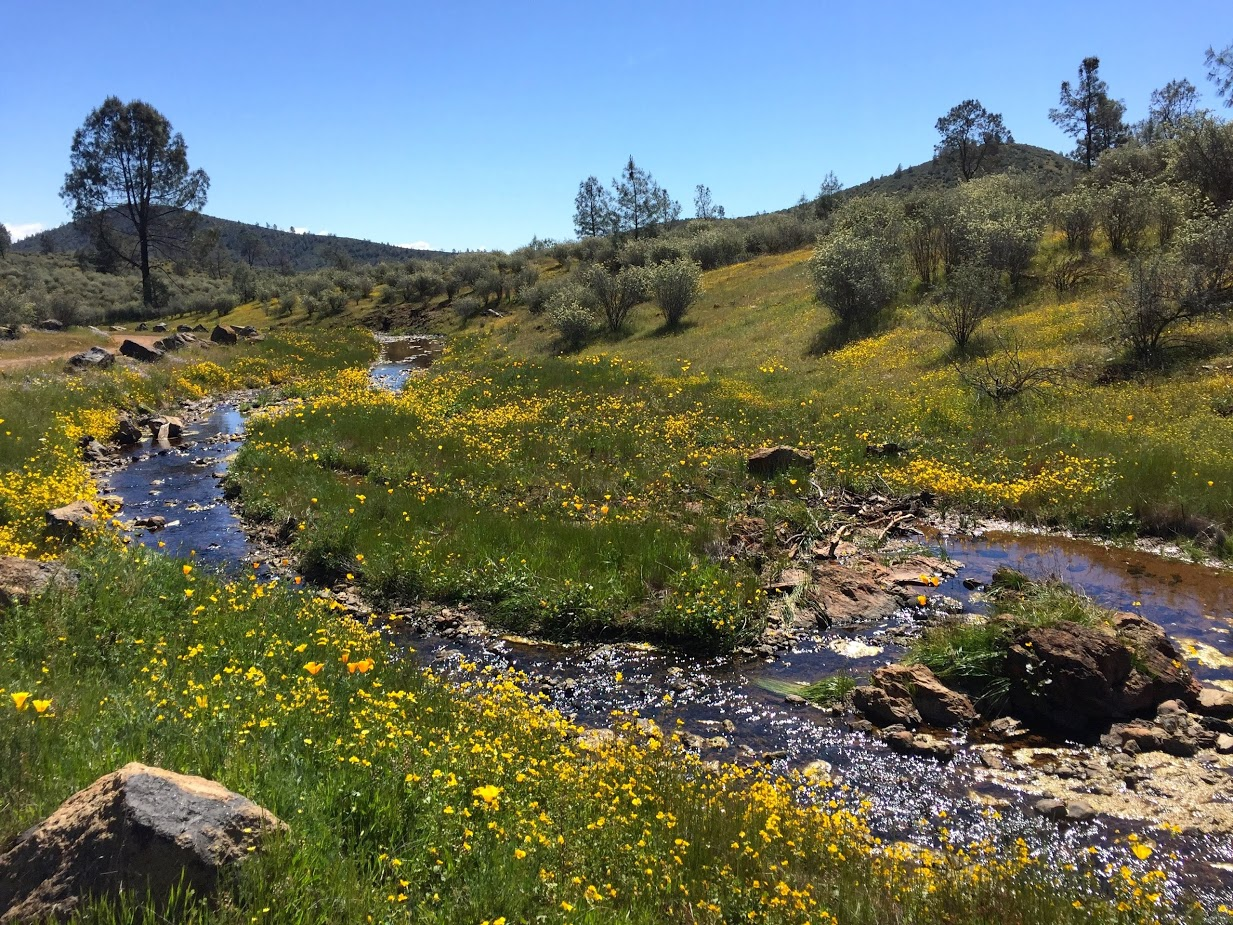
The Red Hills provides a unique ecosystem in the area

The Red Hills contain The Red Hills of Tuolumne County Area of Critical Environmental Concern, managed by the Bureau of Land Management as an Area of Critical Environmental Concern. The Red Hills Management Area consists of 7,100 acres or 2,900 hectares (slightly more than 11 square miles or 28 square kilometres) of public land located near the intersection of California State Route 49 and California State Route 120, just south of the historic town of Chinese Camp, California in Tuolumne County.

The entire Red Hills Management Area has been designated as an Area of Critical Environmental Concern. The purpose of the designation is to protect the rare plant species found there, the unusual serpentine soils that provide habitat for unique flora of the area, habitat for the rare minnow known as the Red Hills roach and to protect bald eagle wintering habitat.

== Geology ==
The Red Hills Management Area is located within the western tectonic block of the Sierra Nevada metamorphic belt. Within this block are Upper Jurassic volcanic and sedimentary rocks of island arc derivation which were highly deformed and weakly metamorphosed during the Nevada orogeny. These rocks were then intruded by plutons associated with the emplacement of the Sierra Nevada batholith, east of the metamorphic belt.

The Management Area includes much of the Tuolumne ultramafic complex, one of the largest exposures of serpentine rocks in the Sierra Nevada metamorphic belt. Nearly the entire area is underlain by dunite, a variety of peridotite consisting of dark green olivine and minor chromite, which has been partly or entirely serpentinized to antigorite magnesite-magnetite. The dunite intruded into andesite pillow breccias and flows of the Peñon Blanco volcanic formation, which crops out near the northeast and southern boundaries of the Management Area. The intrusion of ultramafic material occurred along crustal weaknesses associated with the Bear Mountain fault, a northwestward trending thrust fault that dips steeply to the northeast, and has over 10,000 feet (3,000 m) of vertical displacement. The fault zone is on the southwestern boundary of the Management Area, and is believed to have once penetrated the Earth's crust down to the mantle, a probable source of the peridotite.

Other geologic features of the area include northeastward trending dikes that consists of massive, dark brown, hornblende-plagioclase diorite which intruded into the dunite bedrock. A swarm of several dikes occurs in the southeast portion of the Management Area. Some of the dikes exceed one mile in length. Amphibolite and chert tectonic blocks also occur in the dunite near the area's southern and western boundaries.

Tertiary and Pleistocene alluvium consisting of sand, gravel, pebbles, and cobbles has accumulated in Six Bit and Poor Man's Gulches in the northern and eastern portions of the Management Area.

== Flora ==
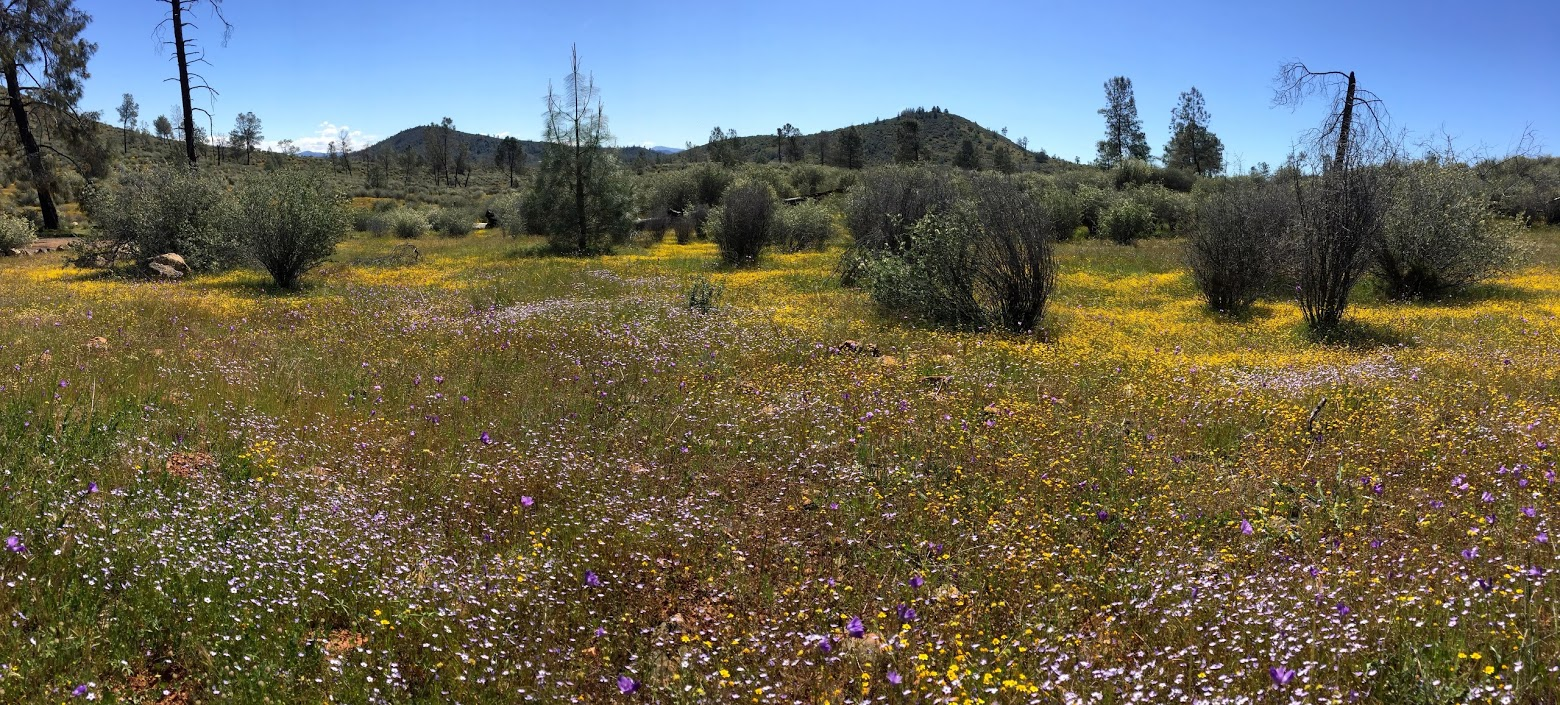
The Red Hills area is host to shrubs, perennial grasses, and wildflowers

The Red Hills are vegetated mostly by a foothill pine-buckbrush chaparral/woodland. Virtually the only tree species in the Red Hills is foothill pine (Pinus sabiniana), which is found throughout the Red Hills in low densities. Buckbrush (Ceanothus cuneatus) comprises a majority of the shrub cover. Other shrubs include toyon (Heteromeles arbutifolia), coffee berry (Rhamnus californica tomentella), chamise (Adenostoma fasciculatum), hollyleaf redberry (Rhamnus crocea ilicifolia), California yerba santa (Eriodictyon californicum), and manzanitas (Arctostaphylos spp.).

Native perennials constitute a large percentage of the grass cover in the Red Hills. This is in contrast to similar elevations in the foothills, without serpentine substrates, where native perennials have been mostly replaced by exotic annuals. Important native perennial species include California oniongrass (Melica californica), big squirreltail grass (Sitanion jubatum) and pine bluegrass (Poa secunda). Disturbed areas, including burned areas, have a typical array of Mediterranean annual grasses.

Herbaceous plants provide a spectacular wildflower bloom in the spring that attracts tourists, amateur naturalists, and classes from educational institutions. Although most of the species comprising the display are widespread on and off serpentine, some (in addition to the rare species discussed below) are strict serpentine endemics (e.g., Streptanthus polygaloides).

=== Sensitive plants ===
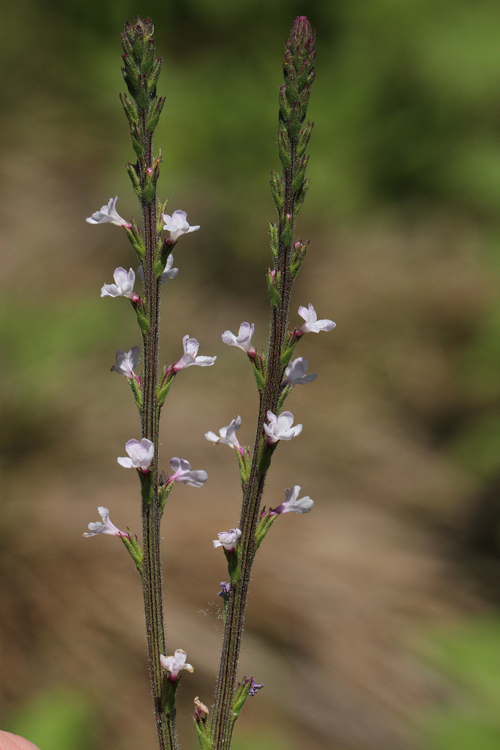
California verbena is endemic to the Red Hills

Five plants which occur on the public lands of the Red Hills are considered sensitive species by BLM due to their rarity. Two of the plants have been proposed for listing under the Endangered Species Act indicating that the United States Fish and Wildlife Service feels it has accumulated sufficient evidence to list these species. These plants are the California verbena (Verbena californica), Rawhide Hill onion (Allium tuolumnense). A third plant species, Layne's butterweed (Senecio layneae), has already been listed as a threatened species.

- California verbena is a Red Hills endemic, meaning it is found nowhere else in the world. Its distribution in the Red Hills is confined to the short stream reaches that remain moist year round because of ground water seepage.
- The Rawhide Hill onion has many, mostly small, colonies in the Red Hills. Rawhide Hill onion is confined to areas with sparse vegetation, south facing slopes with shallow soils, and intermittent drainages.
- Layne's butterweed is the only federally listed plant species in the Red Hills at this time. There are only a few very small occurrences of this member of the sunflower family in the Red Hills. Here as elsewhere, this species is often associated with disturbances like roadcuts. Senecio layneae is also found in El Dorado County on serpentine and gabbro.

Two plants that had been designated as federal candidate category 2 species were eliminated from the list of candidate species when the U.S. Fish and Wildlife Service changed its rules for the inclusion of species as candidates in 1996. Congdon's lomatium (Lomatium congdonii) and the Red Hills soaproot (Chlorogalum grandiflorum) are locally common throughout the Red Hills favoring north slopes and ridgetops respectively. Congdon's lomatium is only known from the Red Hills and the Peoria Valley area. Red Hills soaproot is also found in El Dorado County, California on serpentine and gabbro.

An additional species proposed for federal listing occurs on private lands just west of Chinese Camp and within a mile of the public land. Chinese Camp brodiaea (Brodiaea pallida) grows near a low gradient drainage in soils that remain wet late into the growing season. This species has not been located on the public lands of the Red Hills.

Another plant, Hoover's butterweed (Senecio clevelandii var. heterophyllus) has been included on the California Native Plant Society's Watch List. It grows with the California verbena in riparian zones. It may be recognized as a separate taxon that is endemic to the Red Hills, or it may be included as a single taxon with plants found in the Coast Ranges.

== Fauna ==
In the Red Hills buckbrush and other shrubs provide browse and seeds for small populations of mammals, including mule deer, jackrabbits, rodents. Coyotes, bobcats and fox can also be found in the Red Hills.

88 bird species have been observed in the Red Hills. Some common species include mourning dove, acorn woodpecker, ash-throated flycatcher, scrub jay, wrentit, plain titmouse, bushtit, Bewick's wren, and house finch. Valley quail and mourning doves are the major game birds in the Red Hills. An abundant insect population supports insectivorous birds including western kingbirds, ash- throated flycatcher, tree swallows, barn swallows, black phoebes, and others. Raptors include the red-tailed hawk, Cooper's hawk, prairie falcon, and great horned owl. Fish-eating birds seen in the Red Hills include the belted kingfisher and great blue heron. Roadrunners can also be found.

Reptiles and amphibians are rarely observed in the Red Hills but two rare species are represented (see below).

Fish in the Red Hills, found in Six Bit Gulch and Poor Man's Creek, include the green sunfish, large-mouth bass, Sacramento sucker, and the mosquito fish. These fish are predators or competitors with the Red Hills roach, a rare taxon of minnow (discussed below). The presence of these mostly introduced species may limit the roach population.

Rare fauna: Four sensitive species of animals are known from the Red Hills. Wintering bald eagles roost along the shores of Don Pedro Reservoir and have been observed where Six Bit Gulch enters the lake. As many as 20 bald eagles have been sighted during the winter on the shores of Don Pedro Reservoir, roosting in stands of foothill pines.

Although the Red Hills has no perennial streams, it has a number of intermittent streams that have spring-fed reaches and pools. Two sensitive riparian animal species are associated with these areas, Hesperoleucus symmetricus subsp. serpentinus (a minnow; the distinctive Red Hills population or subspecies of California roach called the Red Hills roach) and Rana boylii (foothill yellow legged frog).

The Red Hills roach is found in abundance in several pools of permanent water located along the intermittent streams which drain into Six Bit Gulch and Poor Man's Gulch. It is thought that the permanent pools are spring-fed. During the dry part of the year the fish are confined to these permanent pools surviving in warm shallow water until spring when they move upstream to spawn. A recent study by ichthyologists at the University of California, Davis, and the California Department of Fish and Game has indicated that the Red Hills variety of California roach has unique morphologic characteristics, which make them noticeably different from other roach populations, notably a chisel lip. The chisel lip is used to scrape algae, a major food source, off submerged rocks.

The foothill yellow-legged frog has been found in the western portion of the Red Hills in the Andrews Creek drainage. The western pond turtle has been found in the eastern portion of the Red Hills in Poor Man's Gulch. Both are rare species, formerly candidates for federal listing.

== Gold ==
Placer gold occurs in stream channel deposits within the natural area, primarily Six Bit Gulch and Poor Man's Gulch, mostly washed in from the north..

The placer gold produced from this district was recovered by ground sluicing and hydraulic mining in earlier years, and by dragline dredging in the 1930s and 1940s. In the 1850s, during the great California Gold Rush, Chinese laborers, with their legendary patience and thoroughness, mined much of the placer gold within Six Bit Gulch, a major drainage channel that courses through the natural area. The dredging of Six Bit Gulch and Poor Man's Gulch produced over $100,000 worth of gold.

== See also ==
- California interior chaparral and woodlands
- List of plants of the Sierra Nevada (U.S.)
- Category: Endemic flora of California
- Category: Bureau of Land Management areas in California
