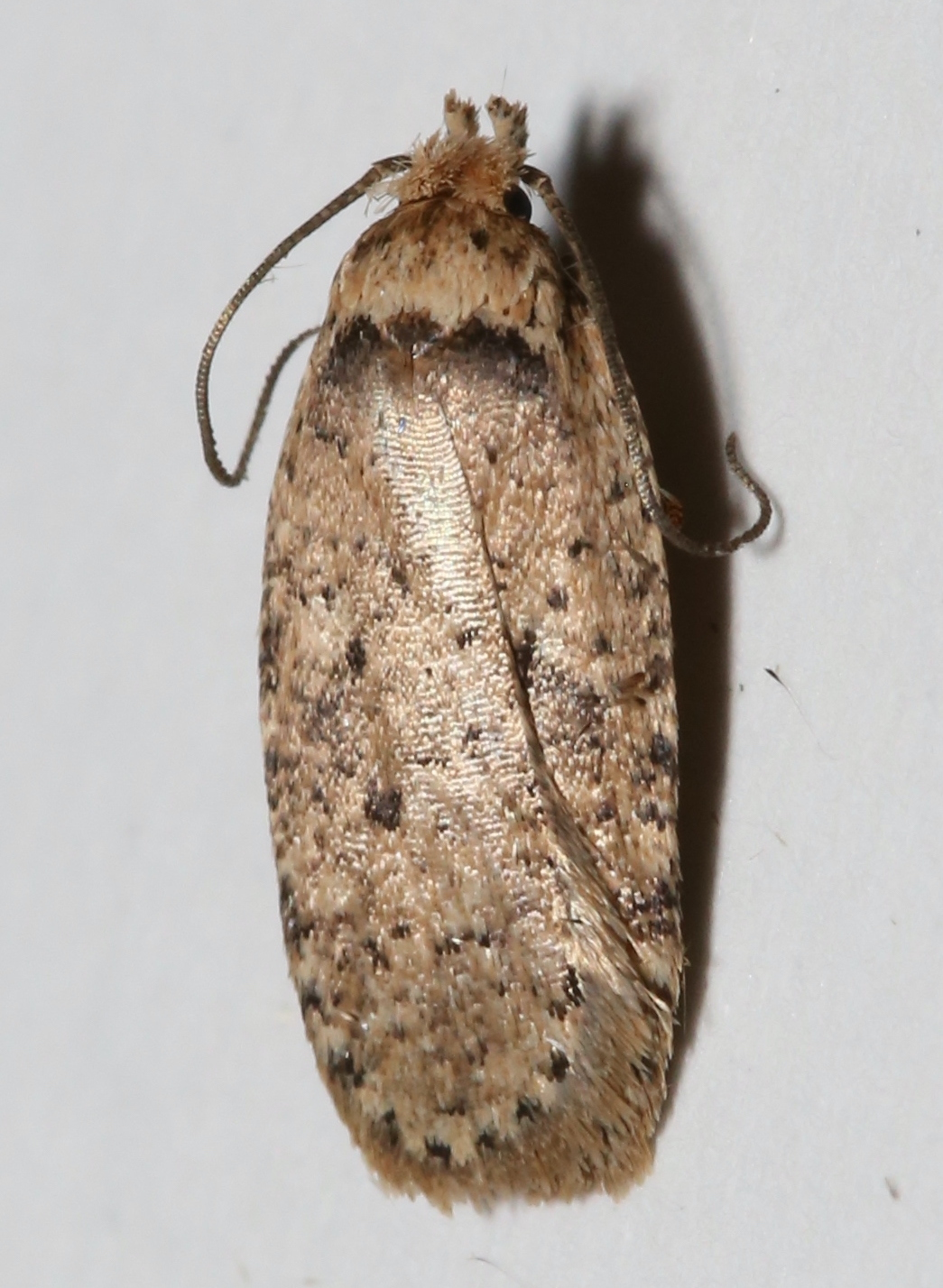

Scientific classification
- Kingdom: Animalia
- Phylum: Arthropoda
- Clade: Pancrustacea
- Class: Insecta
- Order: Lepidoptera
- Family: Depressariidae
- Genus: Agonopterix
- Species: A. canadensis

Binomial name
- Agonopterix canadensis (Busck, 1902)

Synonyms
- Depressaria canadensis Busck, 1902; Depressaria pallidella Busck, 1904; Agonopteryx terinella Barnes & Busck, 1920; Depressaria sciadopa Meyrick, 1920; Agonopteryx serrae Clarke, 1933

= Agonopterix canadensis =

Species of moth

Agonopterix canadensis, the Canadian agonopterix, is a moth of the family Depressariidae. It is found from the north-eastern United States and southern Canada, south through the Rocky Mountains to Colorado, the Basin Range and the mountains of central California and Nevada.

The length of the forewings is 8.5-10.5 mm.

The larvae feed on Senecio species, including Senecio serra.
