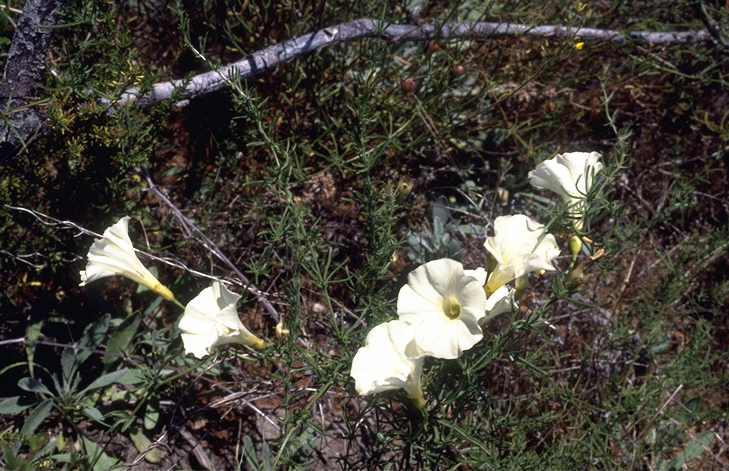

Conservation status
- Critically Imperiled (NatureServe)

- Endangered (ESA)

Scientific classification
- Kingdom: Plantae
- Clade: Tracheophytes
- Clade: Angiosperms
- Clade: Eudicots
- Clade: Asterids
- Order: Solanales
- Family: Convolvulaceae
- Genus: Convolvulus
- Species: C. stebbinsii

Binomial name
- Convolvulus stebbinsii (Brummitt) S.C.Nepom. & Buril

Synonyms
- Calystegia stebbinsii Brummitt

= Convolvulus stebbinsii =

Species of morning glory

Convolvulus stebbinsii is a rare species of morning glory known by the common name Stebbins' false bindweed. It is endemic to the Sierra Nevada foothills of California, where it is known from only two spots in El Dorado and Nevada Counties. It grows in unique habitat in chaparral on gabbro soils. It is a federally listed endangered species.

== Description ==
Convolvulus stebbinsii is a perennial herb producing climbing, white haired, vine-like stems approaching a meter in maximum length. The leaves are up to about 5 centimeters long and palmate in shape with 7 to 9 long, narrow lobes; the distinctive shape of the leaves make the plant easy to identify among the morning glories native to the region.

The inflorescence bears flowers atop long peduncles, each flower about 3 centimeters wide and white or cream-yellow in color, sometimes tinted with pink. They are pollinated by bees and other insects. Like many other chaparral plants, this species has seeds which are stimulated to germinate by exposure to wildfire. It also reproduces via rhizome.

== Conservation ==
The plant's type specimen was collected by G. Ledyard Stebbins in 1970 outside of Placerville, California. The species was described to science and named for him in 1974. The plant is known from only two locations, each containing a scattering of occurrences. Both locations are on the Pine Hill intrusion, a section of gabbro-based rock that oozed as magma into the surrounding rock and then solidified there, eventually becoming exposed as the softer rock around them eroded away. This gabbro intrusion yields red-colored soil that is rich in heavy metals, and some plants are adapted to this kind of substrate. C. stebbinsii grows on the gabbro soil as well as the similar serpentine soil that can also be found in the intrusion. Other species are completely limited to the gabbro sections. The Pine Hill Ecological Reserve was established to protect these unique and often rare plant species.

At the time it was placed on the endangered species list, at least one third of the known occurrences of the plant had been destroyed, mostly by development of its habitat. Most of the sites that still existed were in danger of destruction. With destruction and fragmentation of the habitat come associated activity such as road construction, trash dumping, off-road vehicle use, and herbicides.

The plant does not tolerate shade, and when the brush around it grows too high and shades it out, it does not survive. This suggests it requires disturbance, such as wildfire, to clear the overgrowth. Fire suppression is detrimental. Protected and managed areas of the habitat undergo controlled burns.
