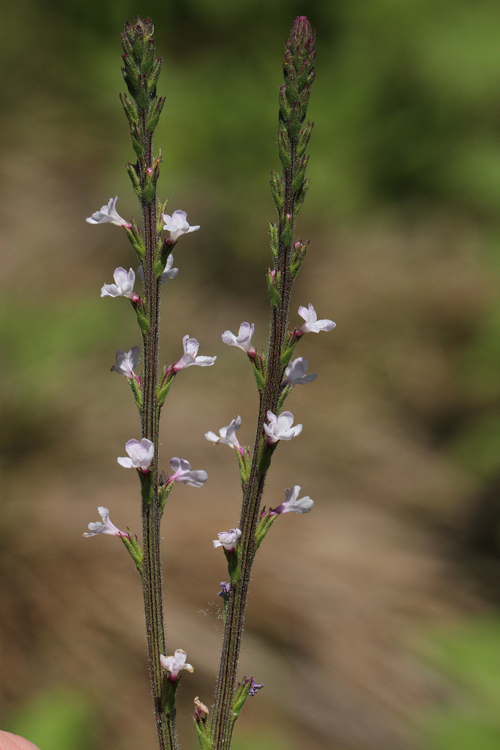

Conservation status
- Imperiled (NatureServe)

- Threatened (ESA)

Scientific classification
- Kingdom: Plantae
- Clade: Tracheophytes
- Clade: Angiosperms
- Clade: Eudicots
- Clade: Asterids
- Order: Lamiales
- Family: Verbenaceae
- Genus: Verbena
- Species: V. californica

Binomial name
- Verbena californica Moldenke

= Verbena californica =

Species of flowering plant

Verbena californica is a rare species of verbena known by the common names California vervain and Red Hills vervain. This flower is endemic to Tuolumne County, California, where it is known from ten or eleven occurrences in the Red Hills, a section of the Sierra Nevada foothills near Chinese Camp. It grows in moist woodland habitat, often on serpentine soils. It is a federally listed threatened species of the United States.

This is a green herb about half a meter in height with a fuzzy stem and long, grasslike leaves. It bears spike inflorescences of tiny purple flowers.

This rare plant is threatened by a number of factors, including cattle grazing, trash dumping, gold mining, off-road vehicles, and development in its habitat. The plant reproduces asexually by sprouting from its underground bulb; this may be a factor in its limited distribution.
