= Melanotrichus boydi =

Scientific classification
- Domain: Eukaryota
- Kingdom: Animalia
- Phylum: Arthropoda
- Class: Insecta
- Order: Hemiptera
- Suborder: Heteroptera
- Family: Miridae
- Genus: Melanotrichus
- Species: M. boydi

Binomial name
- Melanotrichus boydi Schwartz & Wall, 2001

Plant bug species which feeds on a nickel hyperaccumalator plant

Melanotrichus boydi (syn. Orthotylus boydi) is a species of plant bug in the family Miridae. It is notable as the only insect that is known to feed exclusively on a plant which hyperaccumulates nickel, specifically the milkwort jewelflower Streptanthus polygaloides. In turn nickel accumulates in the cell tissues of M. boydi offering it partial protection from predators in its environment.

== Nickel effects in the M. boydi food chain ==
S. polygaloides hyperaccumulates nickel in its leaves as an adaptation to living on serpentine soils which are high in nickel content (high concentrations of nickel typically impairs the growth of plants). This excess metal is of some benefit to the plant as it makes it toxic to many generalist insect herbivores as well as various pathogens. However M. boydi not only tolerates the high nickel concentration in the leaves of S. polygaloides but feeds exclusively on this plant at both larval and adult stages.

As a result, the body tissues of Melanotrichus boydi are nearly 0.8% nickel by dry weight, exceeding the concentration found in low-grade nickel ore.

Researchers have wondered if this high tissue concentration was of any benefit to M. boydi itself. Subsequent lab experiments found that a diet of M. boydi was toxic to Misumena vatia (a spider common in this habitat), while other local predators such as Pholcus phalangioides, Stagmomantis californica, and Chrysoperla carnea were unaffected. Thus it was concluded the high nickel concentration accumulated in the tissues of M. boydi were of some adaptive benefit to this insect.
