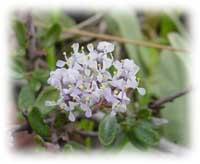

Conservation status
- Endangered (ESA)

Scientific classification
- Kingdom: Plantae
- Clade: Embryophytes
- Clade: Tracheophytes
- Clade: Angiosperms
- Clade: Eudicots
- Clade: Rosids
- Order: Rosales
- Family: Rhamnaceae
- Genus: Ceanothus
- Species: C. roderickii

Binomial name
- Ceanothus roderickii Knight

= Ceanothus roderickii =

Species of flowering plant

Ceanothus roderickii is a rare species of shrub in the family Rhamnaceae known by the common name Pine Hill ceanothus. It is endemic to western El Dorado County, California, where it grows in the chaparral and woodlands of the Sierra Nevada foothills, such as the Pine Hill Ecological Reserve. It is named after 20th century California flora explorer, botanist, and arboretum director Wayne Roderick.

== Description ==
This rare shrub is up to about 3 meters wide and flat, forming low brambles or mats. The grayish brown stems root at nodes as they grow horizontally along the ground. The tiny evergreen leaves are oppositely arranged. Each is only about a centimeter long, widely lance-shaped and smooth along the edges or sometimes toothed near the tip. The top surface is green and hairless and the underside is somewhat woolly. The inflorescence is a small cluster of white to pale blue flowers. The fruit is a capsule about half a centimeter long, sometimes bearing small horns on top.

== Habitat ==
Ceanothus roderickii is found almost exclusively on soils of gabbro origin in the Pine Hill Geological Formation. It is a federally listed endangered species.

== Conservation ==
This endangered plant was first collected in 1956 near Shingle Springs. It is threatened by several factors, including suppression of the wildfire it requires for reproduction, off-road vehicles, road maintenance and construction, and development. There are ten to twenty remaining occurrences.
