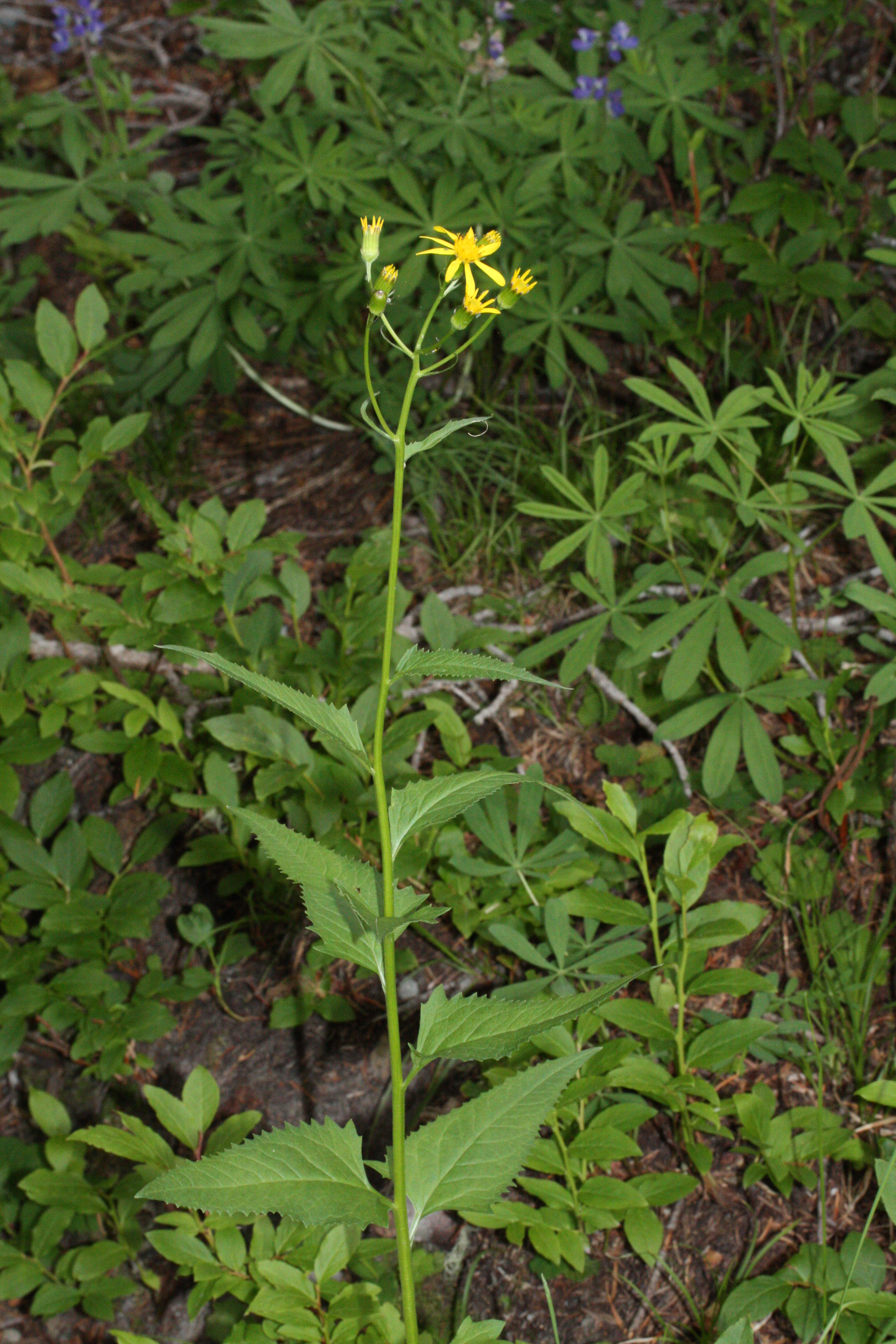
- Senecio triangularis in Mount Rainier National Park

Conservation status
- Secure (NatureServe)

Scientific classification
- Kingdom: Plantae
- Clade: Tracheophytes
- Clade: Angiosperms
- Clade: Eudicots
- Clade: Asterids
- Order: Asterales
- Family: Asteraceae
- Genus: Senecio
- Species: S. triangularis

Binomial name
- Senecio triangularis Hooker

Synonyms
- Senecio gibbonsii Greene; Senecio saliens Rydberg; Source: IPNI, FNA.

= Senecio triangularis =

Species of flowering plant

Senecio triangularis, known as arrowleaf ragwort, arrowleaf groundsel and arrowleaf butterweed, is a species of the genus Senecio and family Asteraceae.

== Description ==
It is similar in form to Senecio serra, both being four feet tall, have narrow and serrated leaves, and are topped with many small, yellow sunflowers. but S. triangularis is more common. S. triangularis has single erect stems, reaching up to 10–120 cm (4–47 in) tall. The stems have evenly distributed leaves. The leaves are up to 20 cm (8 in) long and triangular with tapered ends, hence the name.

The green involucral bracts have black tips with hairy tufts. On display from June to September, the yellow flower heads are up to 4 cm (1 1/2 in) wide, with about 8 rays around a disk.

As some plants are diploid, meaning having two sets of chromosomes; this can be used to identify hybrids and classification of groupings. It has been counted as 2n = 40, 80.

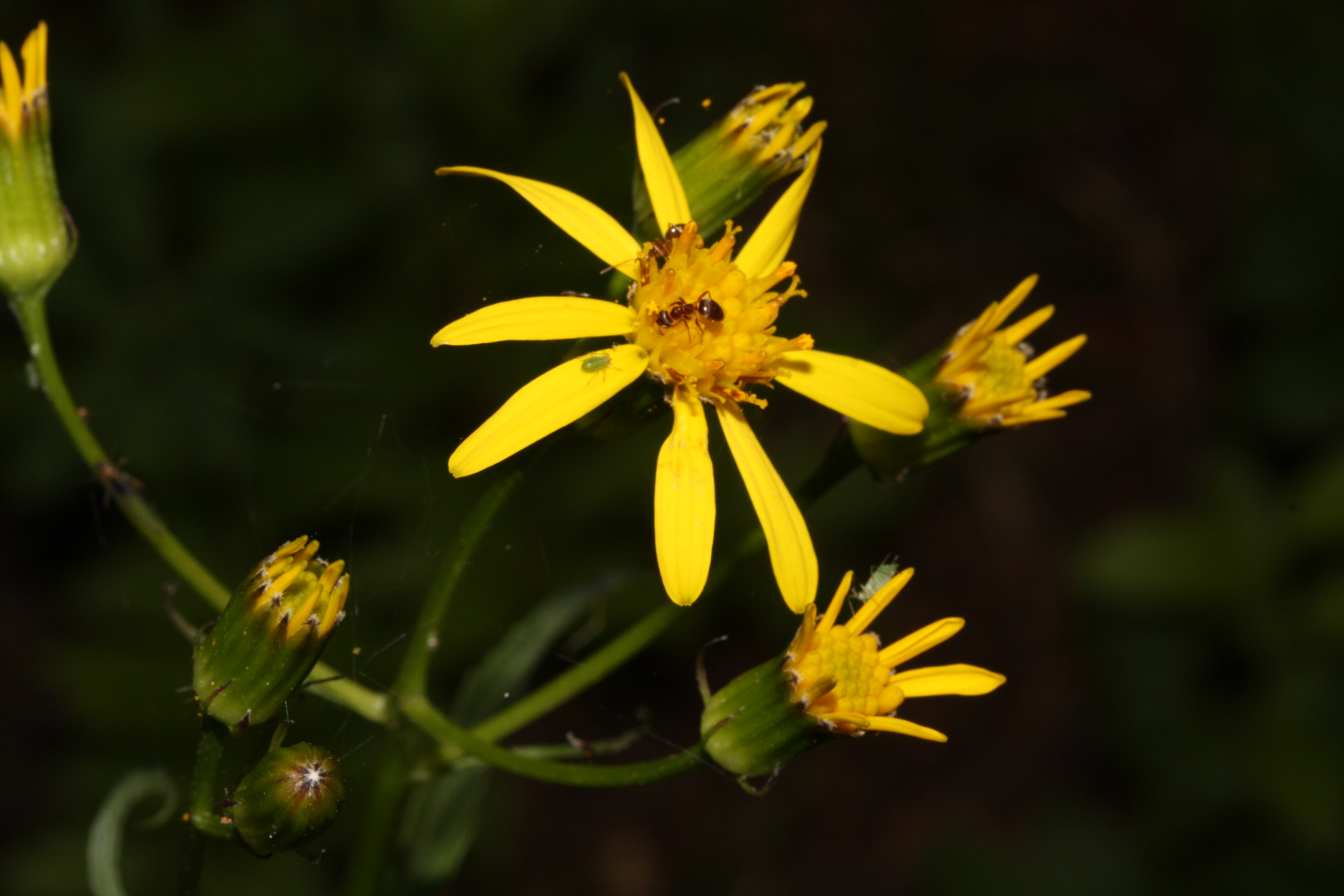
Flower close-up

== Taxonomy ==
It has the common names of arrowleaf ragwort, arrowleaf groundsel, and arrowleaf butterweed.

In the early 1830s, Scottish botanist Thomas Drummond collected this plant, probably on his second trip to the United States. The plant was named by Drummond's mentor, William Jackson Hooker, who first published and described it in 1834.

== Distribution and habitat ==
It is native to temperate regions of America:

Nearctic:

Subarctic America: Northwest Territory, Yukon Territory, Alaska
Western Canada: Alberta, British Columbia
Northwestern United States: Colorado, Idaho, Montana, Oregon, Washington, Wyoming
Southwestern United States: Arizona, California, Nevada, Utah, New Mexico

It grows in open woodlands, (mainly coniferous forests) and on rocky stream sides. They can grow at altitudes of between 100 and 3,500 m (330 and 11,480 ft).

== Ecology ==
It is reportedly poisonous to animals.
