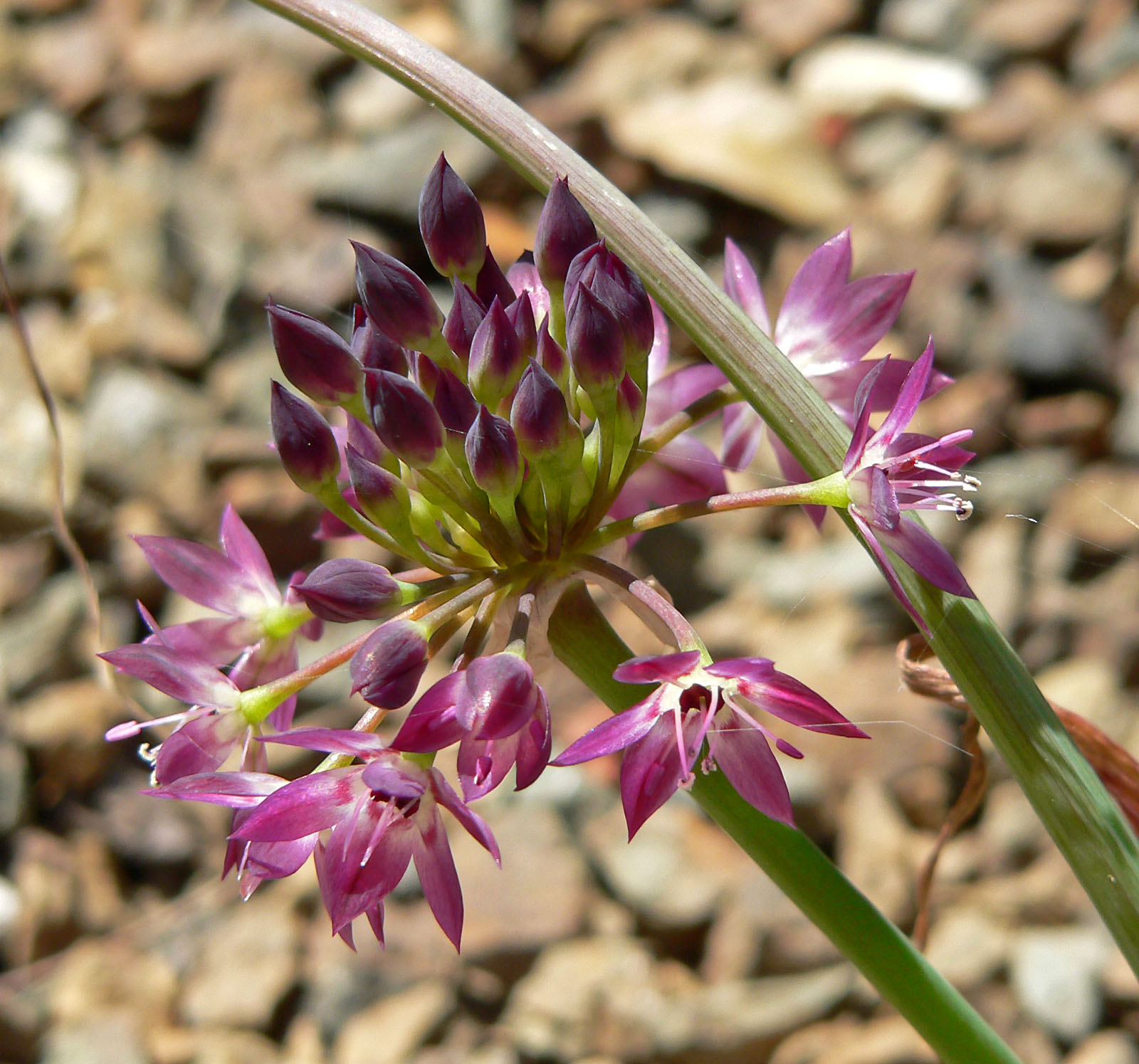

Conservation status
- Imperiled (NatureServe)

Scientific classification
- Kingdom: Plantae
- Clade: Tracheophytes
- Clade: Angiosperms
- Clade: Monocots
- Order: Asparagales
- Family: Amaryllidaceae
- Subfamily: Allioideae
- Genus: Allium
- Species: A. tuolumnense

Binomial name
- Allium tuolumnense (Ownbey & Aase ex Traub) S. Denison & McNeal

Synonyms
- Allium sanbornii var. tuolumnense Ownbey & Aase ex Traub

= Allium tuolumnense =

Species of flowering plant

Allium tuolumnense is a rare species of wild onion, known by the common name Rawhide Hill onion.

It is endemic to Tuolumne County, California, where it is known only from a small section of the Sierra Nevada foothills at Rawhide Hill and the Red Hills. It is a plant of serpentine soils.

== Description ==
This onion, Allium tuolumnense, grows from a reddish-brown bulb one to two centimeters long, producing a slender erect stem up to 50 centimetres (20 in) tall and usually a single leaf approximately the same length.

The stem is topped with a hemispheric inflorescence holding 20 to 60 flowers, each on a pedicel one or two centimeters long. Each flower is just under a centimeter wide when fully open, with six white or pink oval-shaped tepals. There are six stamens and the ovary has six pointed crests.

== See also ==
- Serpentine soils
- Red Hills (Tuolumne County)
