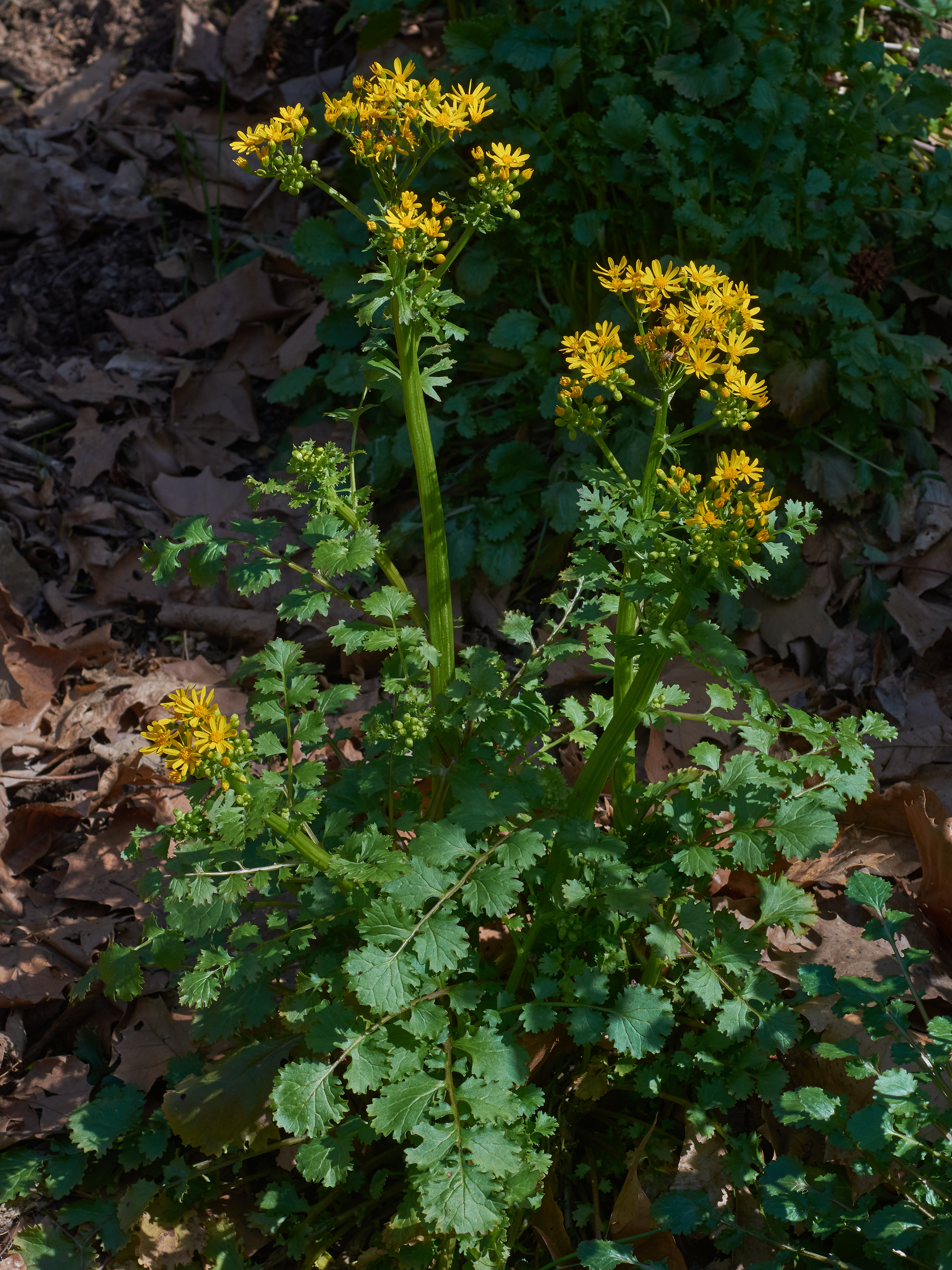
- Butterweed

Conservation status
- Secure (NatureServe)

Scientific classification
- Kingdom: Plantae
- Clade: Embryophytes
- Clade: Tracheophytes
- Clade: Angiosperms
- Clade: Eudicots
- Clade: Asterids
- Order: Asterales
- Family: Asteraceae
- Genus: Packera
- Species: P. glabella

Binomial name
- Packera glabella (Poir.) C.Jeffrey

Synonyms
- Senecio glabellus Pior.; Senecio lobatus Pers.; Senecio carolinianus Spreng.; Senecio densiflorus Mart.; Senecio lobatus Pers.; Senecio lyratus Michx.; Senecio mississipianus DC.

= Packera glabella =

Species of plant native to the United States

Packera glabella (formerly Senecio glabellus) is one of several plants with the common name butterweed. P. glabella has also been called cressleaf groundsel and yellowtop. It is native to central and southeastern North America but spreads so aggressively, overtaking other native plants, that it is considered a noxious weed in Ohio (a designation primarily for agriculture), although the Ohio Invasive Plants does not list the plant on its invasive species list. A 2020 blog post by the Ohio Natural Areas & Preserves Association describes butterweed as "a new invasive species" in Ohio's forested wetlands, noting its rapid spread and impact on native plant communities.

== Taxonomy and nomenclature ==
Packera glabella is a flowering plant in the Asteraceae (Composite) family. It was previously classified under the genus Senecio in older writings on the topic. The reclassification to Packera was made on the basis of genetic and morphological evidence separating North American species from the Senecio group.

== Description ==
As it is a winter annual weed, P. glabella starts off as a rosette in the fall, overwinters as a rosette, flowers in the spring, and produces seeds in the summer. Their bolting stems are hollow and often grow to 3 feet (0.91 m), with inflorescences typically having six to twelve yellow ray flowers. The basal rosette leaves can reach 10 inches (25 cm), and on the margins they have deeply lobed pinnate serrations. As the stem continues to elongate, it becomes hairless and grooved, with red or purple color variations. The individual flower head themselves have an inner disk and outer ray of five to 15 florets. The seed is dispersed by wind via a white, feathery pappus.

== Habitat, distribution, and invasiveness ==
P. glabella is native to the United States, with a native range from Texas to Florida, and from Florida along the coast to Virginia and as west as Nebraska. Records show that the organism was collected in Illinois as early as 1932. The organism thrives in moist, low-lying areas and can bloom in either sun or shade as long as the location remains wet.

Though P. glabella is native it shows high invasiveness, particularly in disturbed or agricultural based habitats. The life cycle of P. glabella allows it to exploit disturbances in the natural soil environment. The plant germinates and produces rosettes in the fall, and produces seeds early in the spring before many native competitors have emerged from winter dormancy. With their seasonal advantage, and their intense seed dispersal, P. glabella can dominate in no-till crop field and pastures.

The species' expansion has been linked to changes in agricultural land management. No-till and reduced-tillage practices create favorable conditions for its germination and overwintering, enabling P. glabella to establish and flower earlier than many competing species. These characteristics, combined with its preference for disturbed soils, have contributed to its increasing abundance in cropland edges, pastures, and unmanaged fields throughout the Midwest. As a result, researchers and field specialists have identified P. glabella as an example of a 'native invasive", a species that expands aggressively under human-modified environmental conditions.

Recent field surveys also show that P. glabella forms seedbanks capable of persisting for multiple years, which increases its ability to rapidly re-establish after disturbance or herbicide treatments. Seed longevity, combined with its early rosette development, allows it to exploit gaps in canopy cover during late winter when competing species are still dormant. Climate factors may also amplify invasibility because wetter springs create ideal germination and bolting conditions, and flood events frequently deposit bare, nutrient-rich silt where seedlings establish easily. These traits reflect a broader ecological pattern documented in disturbance-responsive species, where early spring emergence and flexible germination requirements strongly predict invasive behavior. Its ability to fill entire fields or ditches with dense stands of yellow flowers demonstrates invasive potential even within its native range.

== Toxicity and ecological impact ==
The leaves, flowers, and seeds of P. glabella contain toxic compounds called pyrrolizidine alkaloids, which are known to cause liver damage, such as seneciosis, in livestock. Chronic exposure to this compound may lead to loss of appetite, sluggish behavior and in severe cases, aim walking or neurological impairment. These alkaloids act as natural biocides deterring herbivore animals from consuming them. Beyond toxicity to livestock, pyrrolizidine alkaloids can leach into surrounding soil and water during heavy infestations, which may influence soil invertebrate communities and microbial activity.

P. glabella is toxic to humans if ingested, causing liver damage, but documented cases are rare and most concern livestock.

P. glabella stands have been observed to reduce early-season floral diversity by shading small forbs and grasses before they fully leaf out, creating temporarily simplified plant communities. This early dominance alters both pollinator visitation patterns and the timing of nectar availability because dense P. glabella blooms can crowd out early-spring natives relied on by pollinators. In wetland margins and low-lying agricultural ditches, thick infestations can also impede surface water flow, trap sediment, and shift moisture distribution in ways that favor the plant's own persistence over time.

Dense and intense infestations of P. glabella can also displace the native grasses and forbs which reduced the plant diversity and altering biological compositions in pastures and disturbed land. Due to P. glabella thriving in moist, disturbed soils, it often multiplies in no-till crop systems, roadside ditches, and floodplains, all of these being locations where competition is low.

== Management and control ==
Control of P. glabella focuses on targeting the rosette stage prior to bolting. Infestations in pastures can be managed using 2,4-D or a combination of 2,4-D and dicamba to be applied to the rosettes in the fall or early spring. However, these herbicides will end up also eliminating desirable broadleaf plants like legumes. Research at the University of Illinois in no-till agronomic fields demonstrated that application of 2,4-at one quart per acre to rosettes that are 2-8 inches in diameter achieved 94% or better control of the field.

Other strategies for controlling P. glabella infestations address managing the invasibility of the field such as maintaining vegetative cover, minimizing soil disturbance, and preventing seed production.

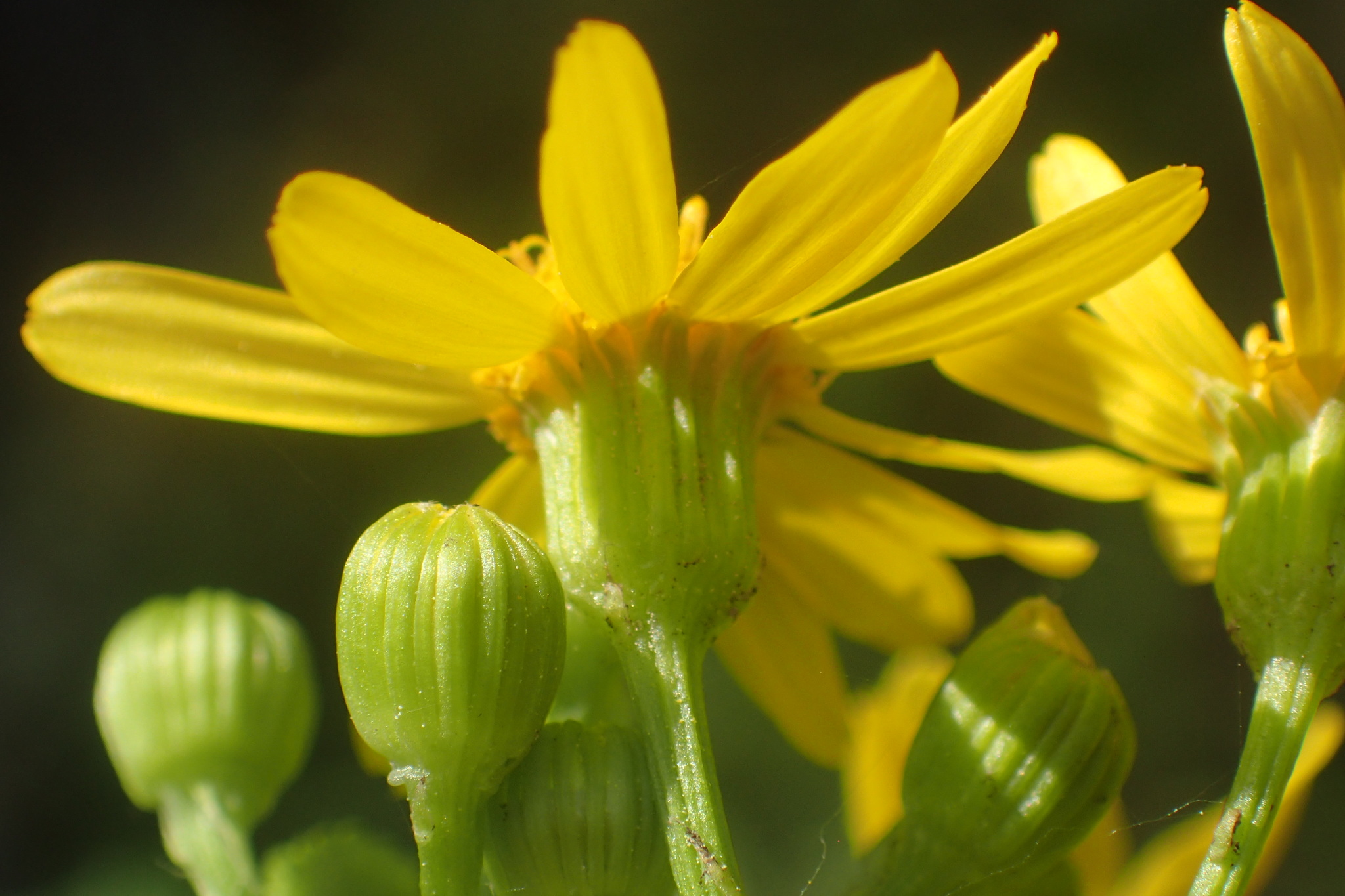
Packera glabella involucres

== Conservation ==
NatureServe lists P. glabella as Secure (G5) worldwide and Critically Imperiled (S1) in Nebraska, Imperiled (S2) in Kansas, and Vulnerable (S3) in North Carolina.
