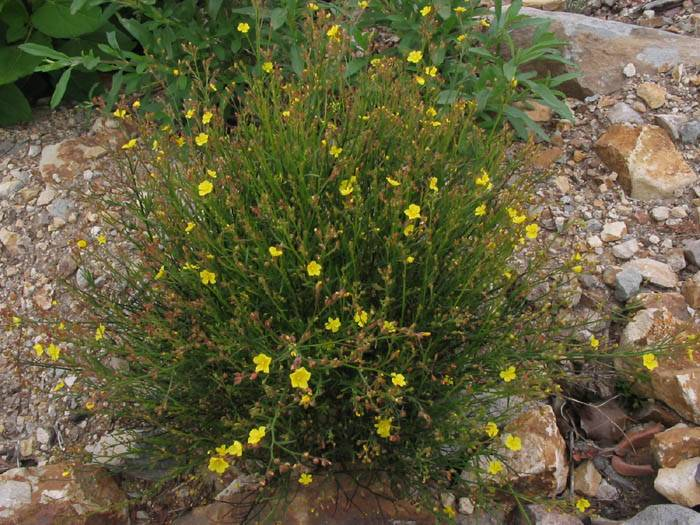

Scientific classification
- Kingdom: Plantae
- Clade: Embryophytes
- Clade: Tracheophytes
- Clade: Spermatophytes
- Clade: Angiosperms
- Clade: Eudicots
- Clade: Rosids
- Order: Malvales
- Family: Cistaceae
- Genus: Crocanthemum
- Species: C. scoparium

Binomial name
- Crocanthemum scoparium (Nutt.) Millsp.

Synonyms
- Helianthemum scoparium Nutt.; Helianthemum suffrutescens

= Crocanthemum scoparium =

Species of flowering plant

Crocanthemum scoparium is a species of rockrose which is endemic to California. Its common names include peak rockrose and peak rushrose. One variety is known as Bisbee Peak rushrose.

It is found in dry, sandy areas in hills and low mountains.

== Description ==
Crocanthemum scoparium is a small perennial shrub bearing long, smooth stems and small flowers each with five bright yellow petals.
