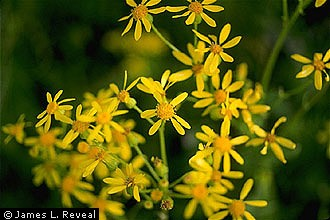
- Texas ragwort

Conservation status
- Apparently Secure (NatureServe)

Scientific classification
- Kingdom: Plantae
- Clade: Tracheophytes
- Clade: Angiosperms
- Clade: Eudicots
- Clade: Asterids
- Order: Asterales
- Family: Asteraceae
- Genus: Senecio
- Species: S. ampullaceus

Binomial name
- Senecio ampullaceus Hook.
- Current range of S. ampullaceus.

= Senecio ampullaceus =

Species of plant

Senecio ampullaceus, also known as Texas ragwort, Texas squaw-weed, Texas groundsel, and Texas butterweed, is a species of Senecio in the family Asteraceae, receiving its Latin name ampullaceus from its flask-shaped flower-head. It is recommended for landscape use in its native Texas.

== Description ==
The seedlings of S. ampullaceus often have a purplish color on the undersides of their leaves in the winter, especially along their midrib. Flowering in early–mid spring, Texas ragwort is a tall annual, growing from 20 centimeters (7.9 in) to 80 centimeters (31 in) tall and similar to S. quaylei.

Stems and leaves: The leaves with broadly winged leaf stalks grow from single stems; the nodes between leaves getting shorter and shorter higher on the stem. Ovate leaves with pointed tips 3 centimeters (1.2 in) to 10 centimeters (3.9 in) long by 1.5 centimeters (0.59 in) to 4 centimeters (1.6 in) wide with tapered bases. Leaves at the lower portion of the plant have more teeth on their edges than the leaves at the upper portion of the mature plant.

Stems and leaves are covered loosely and unevenly with a mat of fine hairs, though occasionally they have no hairs.

Flowers: Flowering stalks have 10 to 30 flower heads which as a group make a flat top to the whole plant. Each flower head is surrounded by 2 to 8 bractlets or mini-leaves, each 1 millimeter (0.039 in) to more than 2 millimeters (0.079 in). Approximately 13 green to grayish bracts, 7 millimeters (0.28 in) to 10 millimeters (0.39 in) long, surround 8 ray florets and an 8 millimeters (0.31 in) to 10 millimeters (0.39 in) corolla.

Fruits: One-seeded fruits with rigid pappus.

Roots: Roots are relatively thin and branching.

== Distribution ==
S. ampullaceus prefers altitudes of 100 meters (330 ft) to 800 meters (2,600 ft) in open sandy or disturbed sites.

Native:

Nearctic:

North-central United States: Missouri
Southeastern United States: Arkansas
South-central United States: Texas

or

Southeastern United States: Arkansas
South central United States: Texas

Current:

Nearctic:

North-central United States: Missouri, Oklahoma
Southeastern United States: Arkansas
South-central United States: Texas

== Varieties or subspecies which are synonyms ==
- Senecio ampullaceus var. floccosus Engelm. & A. Gray
- Senecio ampullaceus var. glaberrimus Engelm. & A. Gray
