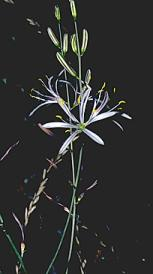

Conservation status
- Vulnerable (NatureServe)

Scientific classification
- Kingdom: Plantae
- Clade: Tracheophytes
- Clade: Angiosperms
- Clade: Monocots
- Order: Asparagales
- Family: Asparagaceae
- Subfamily: Agavoideae
- Genus: Chlorogalum
- Species: C. grandiflorum

Binomial name
- Chlorogalum grandiflorum Hoover

= Chlorogalum grandiflorum =

Species of flowering plant

Chlorogalum grandiflorum is a species of flowering plant known by the common name Red Hills soap plant. It is endemic to the Sierra Nevada foothills, such as the Red Hills (Tuolumne County), of California, where it grows in chaparral, woodland, and forest.

== Description ==
This uncommon perennial wildflower grows from a red or brown-coated bulb up to 7 centimeters wide. The basal leaves have very wavy edges. The inflorescence may be a meter long and is composed of many flowers, each with six tepals which are white with a purple midvein. The tepals are narrow, up to 3 centimeters long, and curl back as they spread open. Each ephemeral flower opens in the evening and closes by the following morning. There are six stamens tipped with yellow anthers. The fruit is a capsule just over half a centimeter long.
