= Streptanthus polygaloides =

Scientific classification
- Kingdom: Plantae
- Clade: Tracheophytes
- Clade: Angiosperms
- Clade: Eudicots
- Clade: Rosids
- Order: Brassicales
- Family: Brassicaceae
- Genus: Streptanthus
- Species: S. polygaloides

Binomial name
- Streptanthus polygaloides A.Gray

Species of flowering plant

Streptanthus polygaloides is a species of flowering plant in the mustard family known by the common name milkwort jewelflower. It is endemic to serpentine soils of the Sierra Nevada foothills of California, where it found in chaparral, grassland, and clearings in oak woodland. It is noteworthy for its ability to hyperaccumlate toxic nickel as an adaptation to living on serpentine soil, while in turn being host plant to the leaf bug Melanotrichus boydi.

== Description ==
The flowers of S. polygaloides don't resemble other crucifers, instead having the appearance of Polygala (milkworts), hence the species and common name. Taking into account the many morphological and ecological differences between S. polygaloides and other members of its genus, the evolutionary history of this plant is far from clear, causing Kruckeberg to exclaim "The origin of this bizarre species is an 'abominable mystery'."

S. polygaloides is an annual herb producing a hairless, sometimes waxy-textured stem under ten centimeters to nearly one meter tall. The ephemeral basal leaves have blades divided into narrow segments and borne on petioles. Leaves higher on the stem have simple, linear blades up to ten centimeters long which lack petioles. Flowers occur at intervals along the upper stem. Each has a folded, hooded, calyx of deeply keeled sepals in shades of greenish yellow to purple. Brown-veined white petals emerge from the tip. The fruit is a smooth, straight, flat or four-angled silique up to five centimeters in length.

== Hyperaccumulator of nickel ==
The Streptanthus polygaloides plant is a hyperaccumulator of nickel, with hyperaccumulation defined as the presence of at least 1,000 μg nickel per gram of dry mass. This species averages 2,430 to 18,600 μg/g. This trait helps protect the plant against many types of pathogens, including the powdery mildew Erysiphe polygoni, the bacterium Xanthomonas campestris, and the fungus Alternaria brassicola. It also helps defend the plant from leaf-chewing insects such as the red-legged grasshopper (Melanoplus femurrubrum) and the moth Evergestis rimosalis, and root-feeding insects like the cabbage maggot (Delia radicum). The high nickel levels in the plant have also been shown to protect it against the diamondback moth (Plutella xylostella). On the other hand, they do not affect all herbivorous insects that attack the plant, perhaps because some insects eat parts of the plant low in nickel, or can tolerate high-nickel diets, or include other, less toxic plant matter in their diets. In fact, one insect thrives on a high-nickel diet, the mirid bug Melanotrichus boydi, which specializes on this plant.

=== Phytoremediation ===
The plant's ability to draw relatively large amounts of nickel from the soil make it of interest as an agent of phytoremediation in soils polluted with heavy metals.
