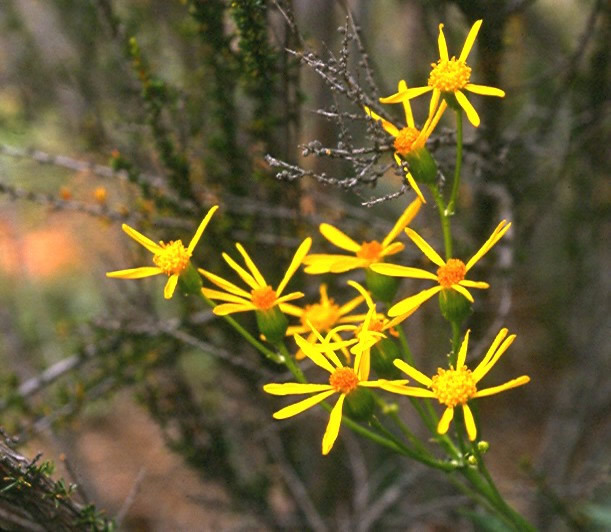

Conservation status
- Imperiled (NatureServe)

- Threatened (ESA)

Scientific classification
- Kingdom: Plantae
- Clade: Tracheophytes
- Clade: Angiosperms
- Clade: Eudicots
- Clade: Asterids
- Order: Asterales
- Family: Asteraceae
- Genus: Packera
- Species: P. layneae

Binomial name
- Packera layneae (Greene) W.A.Weber & Á.Löve

Synonyms
- Senecio layneae

= Packera layneae =

Species of flowering plant

Packera layneae, known by the common name Layne's ragwort and Layne's butterweed, is a rare species of flowering plant in the aster family.

== Distribution ==
The plant is endemic to California, where it is only known from the western slopes of the northern Sierra Nevada foothills. Small populations are found in Yuba, Tuolumne, and Butte Counties, and in the Pine Hill Ecological Reserve in El Dorado County.

== Description ==
Packera layneae is a perennial herb producing an upright stem or a small cluster of stems up to 70 centimeters tall. The thick leaves have wide lance-shaped blades a few centimeters long which are borne on long petioles; smaller leaves occur higher up the stems.

The inflorescence bears several flower heads containing many yellow disc florets and several narrow yellow ray florets each up to 1.6 centimeters long.

== Habitat ==
Packera layneae grows in cismontane chaparral and oak woodlands habitats of the California Interior chaparral and woodlands ecoregion, often on serpentine soils and weathered gabbro.

=== Conservation ===
The plant faces several threats and was federally listed as a threatened species in 1996.

The plant grows in chaparral and woodlands habitats that are dependent on a fire ecology of periodic wildfires. Fire suppression efforts alter available sunlight for germination and ongoing growth, and delay the natural 'biomass maintenance' of all plants in this ecosystem. Other threats include development, mining, off-road vehicle use, grazing, and the increasing presence of invasive plants.

== See also ==
- List of plants of the Sierra Nevada (U.S.)
- Flora of the Sierra Nevada (United States)
- Natural history of the California chaparral and woodlands
