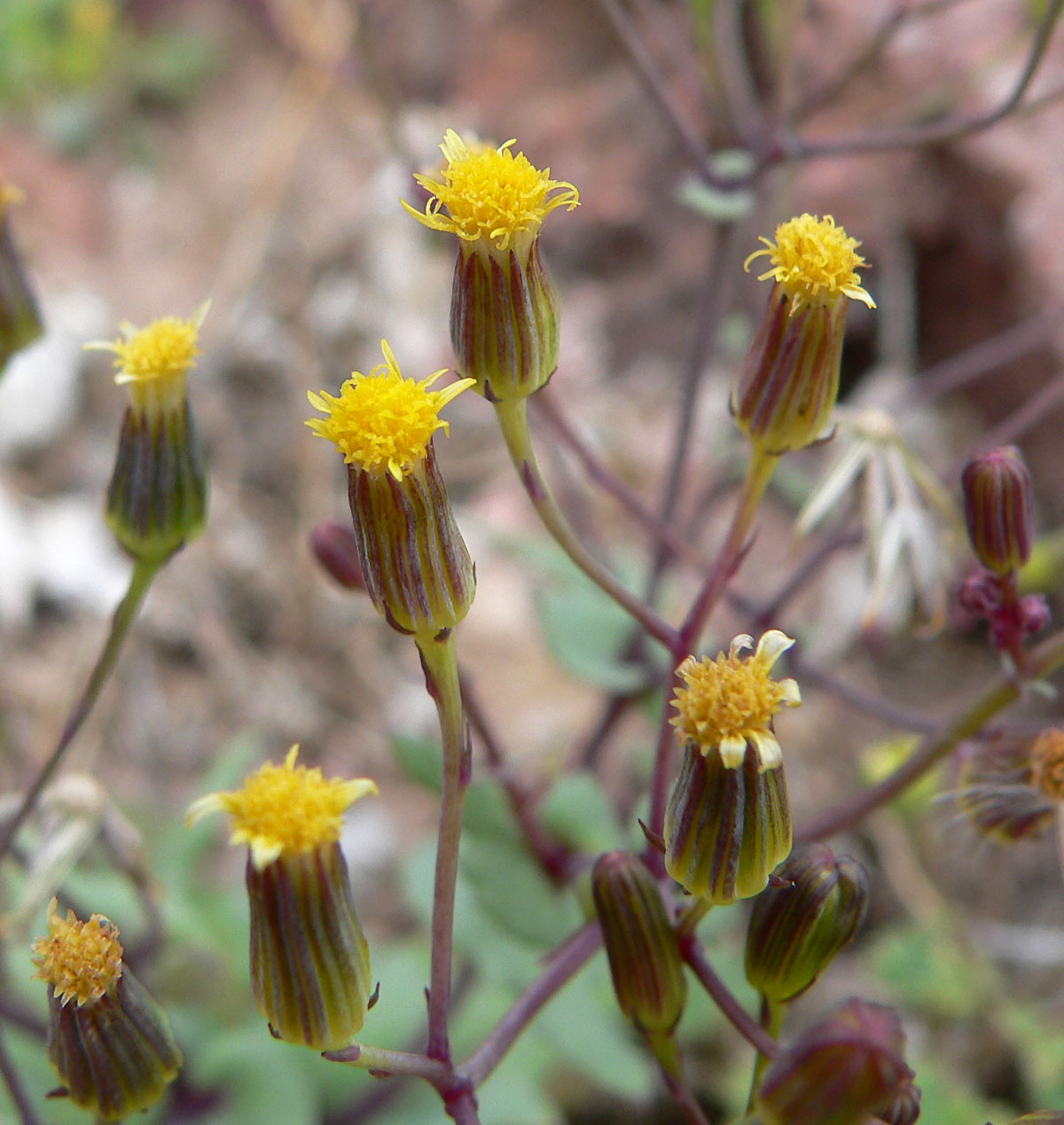

Scientific classification
- Kingdom: Plantae
- Clade: Tracheophytes
- Clade: Angiosperms
- Clade: Eudicots
- Clade: Asterids
- Order: Asterales
- Family: Asteraceae
- Genus: Senecio
- Species: S. mohavensis

Binomial name
- Senecio mohavensis A.Gray

= Senecio mohavensis =

Species of flowering plant

Senecio mohavensis, known by the common name Mojave ragwort, is a species of flowering plant in the aster family.

== Distribution and habitat ==
The annual herb is native to the Mojave Desert in California, northwestern Arizona, and southwestern Nevada (southwestern United States); and to the Sonoran Desert in California and Arizona, and Baja California and Sonora (northwestern Mexico).

It grows in sandy and rocky habitats, often in Creosote bush scrub.

== Description ==
Senecio mohavensis produces a single branching erect stem up to 30 or 40 centimeters in maximum height from a twisted taproot. It is mostly hairless and green to purple in color.

The leaves have lobed or toothed blades a few centimeters long, the lower on short petioles and those higher on the plant with wide bases that clasp the stem.

The inflorescence is a spreading array of several flower heads filled with yellow disc florets, typically numbering between 15 and 30. Some heads have tiny ray florets that may be tucked out of view within the phyllaries. The phyllaries are typically green, hairless, mostly fused, and measure about a third of an inch. The bloom period is March to May, and the plant's toxicity is Minor Dermatitis.
