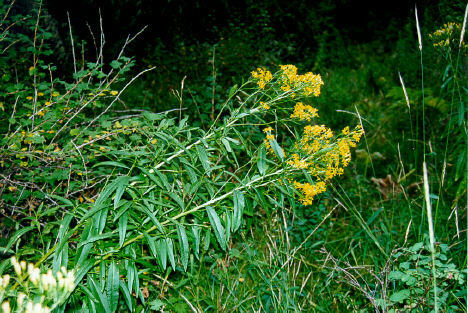

Conservation status
- Secure (NatureServe)

Scientific classification
- Kingdom: Plantae
- Clade: Tracheophytes
- Clade: Angiosperms
- Clade: Eudicots
- Clade: Asterids
- Order: Asterales
- Family: Asteraceae
- Genus: Senecio
- Species: S. serra

Binomial name
- Senecio serra Hook.

= Senecio serra =

Species of flowering plant

Senecio serra is a species of flowering plant in the aster family known by the common names tall ragwort and sawtooth groundsel. It is native to the western United States, where it can be found in several types of habitat, including sagebrush and woodlands. It is a perennial herb producing a single erect stem or a cluster of stems from a branched, woody caudex. The plant can exceed two meters in height. It is hairless in texture, with young plants sometimes appearing fuzzy, and green to red-tinged in color. The leaves have lance-shaped blades up to 20 centimeters long borne on short petioles, the leaves occurring evenly all along the stems. The inflorescence is a spreading array of many flower heads, each lined with green- or black-tipped phyllaries. The heads contain yellow disc florets and 5 to 8 yellow ray florets each under a centimeter long.
