= California interior chaparral and woodlands =

Forests, woodlands, and scrub ecoregion in California, United States

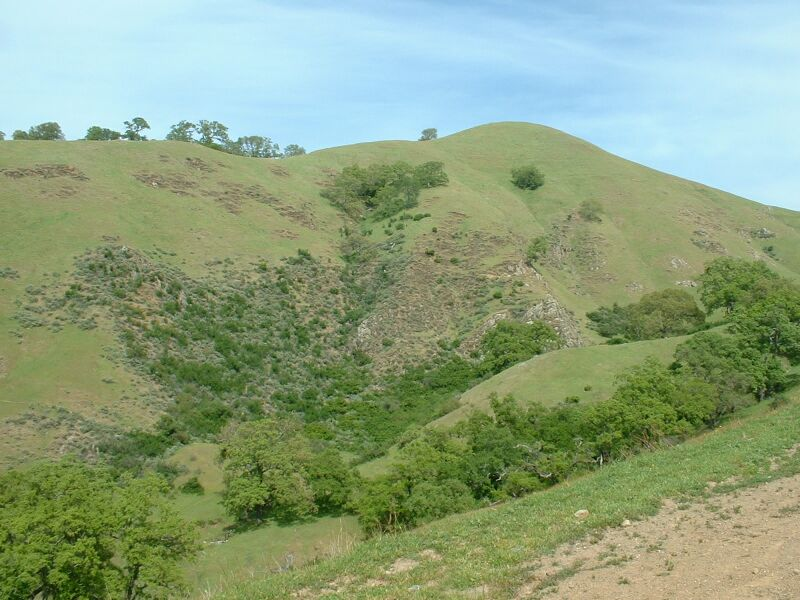
- Hillside in Sunol Regional Wilderness, April 2004

Ecology
- Realm: Nearctic
- Biome: Mediterranean forests, woodlands, and scrub
- Borders: List: California Central Valley grasslands; California montane chaparral and woodlands; Klamath-Siskiyou forests; Northern California coastal forests; Sierra Nevada forests
- Bird species: 231
- Mammal species: 78

Geography
- Area: 64,600 km^{2} (24,900 mi^{2})
- Country: United States
- State: California
- Climate type: Mediterranean (Csa and Csb)

Conservation
- Conservation status: Vulnerable
- Global 200: Yes
- Habitat loss: 12.915%
- Protected: 18.35%

The California interior chaparral and woodlands ecoregion covers 64,000 square kilometres (24,900 mi^{2}) in an elliptical ring around the California Central Valley. It is part of the Mediterranean forests, woodlands, and scrub biome, with cool, wet winters and hot, dry summers. Temperatures within the coast can range from 53° to 65 °F and 32° to 60 °F within the mountains. Many plant and animal species in this ecoregion are adapted to periodic fire.

== Geography ==
The California interior chaparral and woodlands ecoregion extends from as far north as Shasta Lake in Northern California to as far south as the Santa Barbara Channel in Southern California.

Despite being termed as "inland", this ecoregion features extensive coastline between the Central Coast towns of Goleta and San Simeon, as well as within the Monterey and San Francisco Bay areas. These coastal regions are broken up by isolated patches of Northern California coastal forests and California montane chaparral and woodlands, which inhabit the higher elevation Santa Cruz and Santa Lucia Mountains, respectively. At its peak, the chaparral and woodlands rise up to 1,500 metres (5,000 ft) above sea level.

Major urban centers located within this ecoregion include Santa Maria, San Luis Obispo, Salinas, Santa Cruz, San José, San Francisco, Oakland, Santa Rosa, Redding, and Oroville.

It is part of the Mediterranean forests, woodlands, and scrub biome, with cool, wet winters and hot, dry summers. Temperatures can range from 53° to 65 °F and 32° to 60 °F within the mountains.

== Flora ==
These woodlands are varied and rich in plant life. The ecoregion contains areas of grass, chaparral shrublands, savanna dotted with oak, oak woodlands, serpentine soil communities, closed-cone pine forest with small patches of mountain conifers, wetland, marsh, salt marshes, and riverside forest.

Chaparral and oak woodlands are the most widespread plant communities in this ecoregion. The chaparral is composed of diverse shrubs and herbs. These include chamise and several species of manzanita and ceanothus. Gray pine often emerges from the shrubs. Furthermore, when wildfires take place, the Chaparral shrubs reestablish in different ways. Some species mainly produce new plants from seeds. They remain in the soil until conditions favor germination. In contrast, some species regenerate from living tissues that survive through the fire. Also, there is another group which could recover through both seedling and resprouting. These differences in recovery have an impact on the composition of vegetation after fires, especially when fires occur repeatedly before plants could fully recover. These fire recovery strategies are common among chaparral shrubs. However, other types of vegetation in this region may respond to wildfires in different ways. Meanwhile, buckeye is extensive and Blue oak is one of the most extensive of the many varieties of oak in the woodlands: scrub oak, coast live oak, canyon live oak, valley oak, California black oak, and interior live oak. This kind of vegetation relies on the incessant fires for germination as it clears the land and allows for shrubby growth. California sycamore grows in this area as well, important for nesting owls.

The pine and cypress communities on the areas of serpentine soil within this ecoregion harbor many endemic species such as milkwort jewelflower. The main trees of this habitat are Sargent's cypress, MacNab cypress, Monterey pine, Knobcone pine and Bishop pine with California scrub oak.

Small patches of coniferous forest are dominated by Ponderosa pine, Jeffrey pine, sugar pine, Coulter pine, coast Douglas-fir, incense-cedar, white fir and western juniper.

Shrubby and herbaceous plants, including many endemic species, inhabit this ecoregion. It is estimated to contain 2,036 plant species.

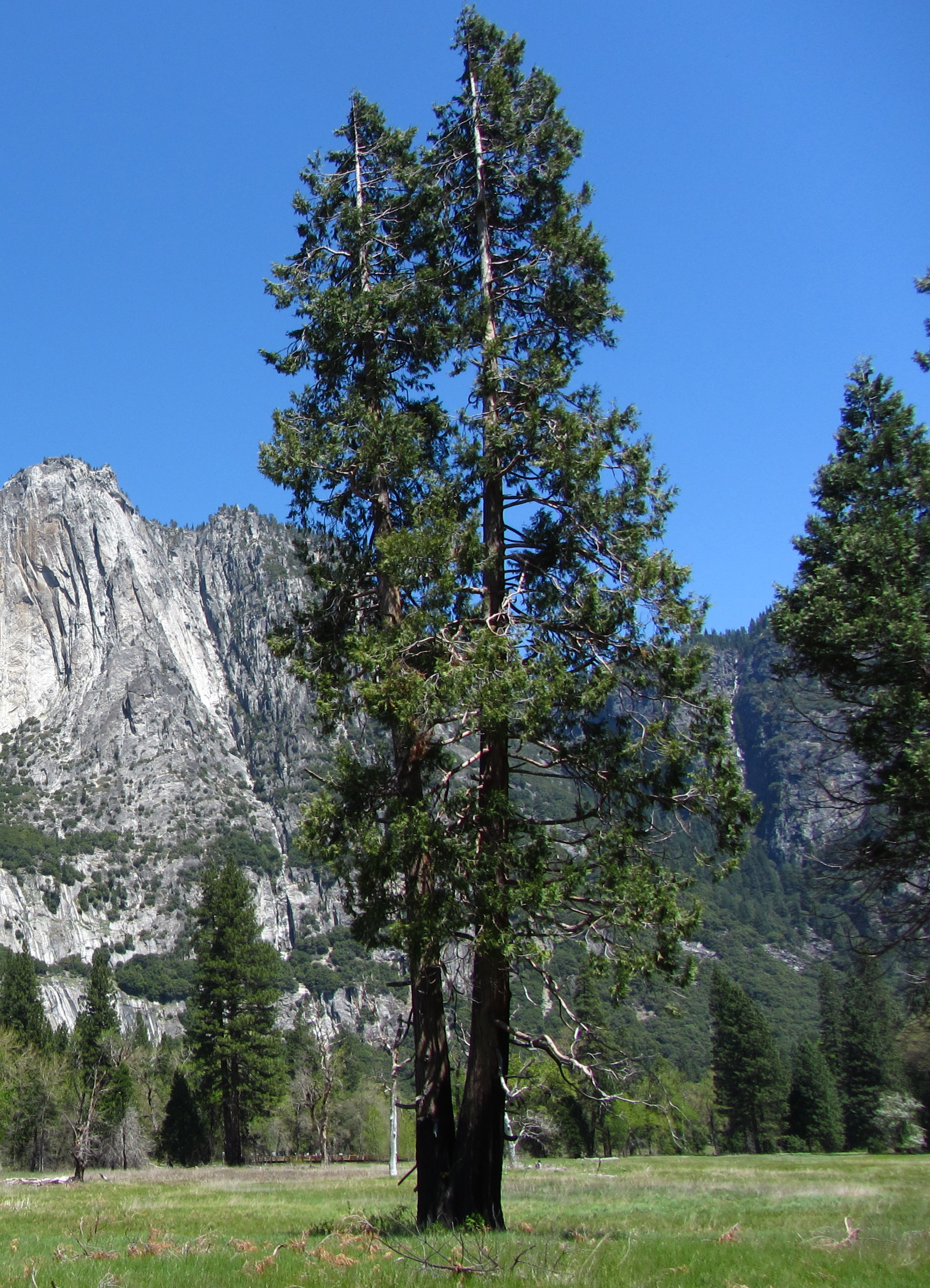
Calocedrus decurrens

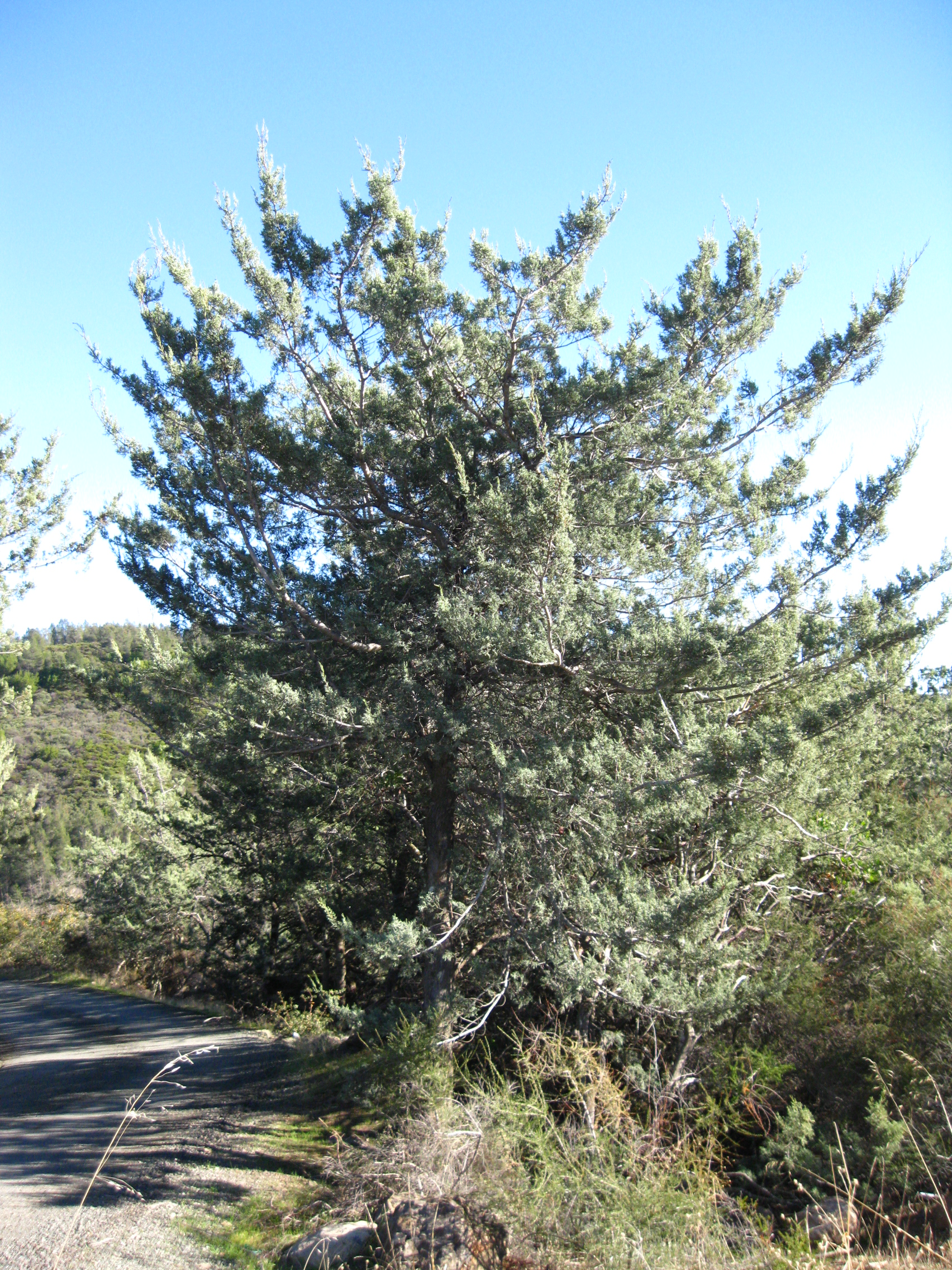
Cupressus macnabiana

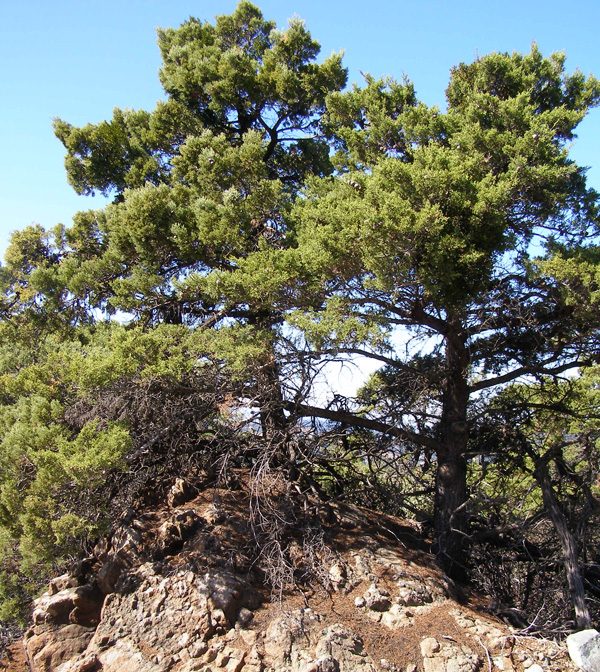
Cupressus sargentii

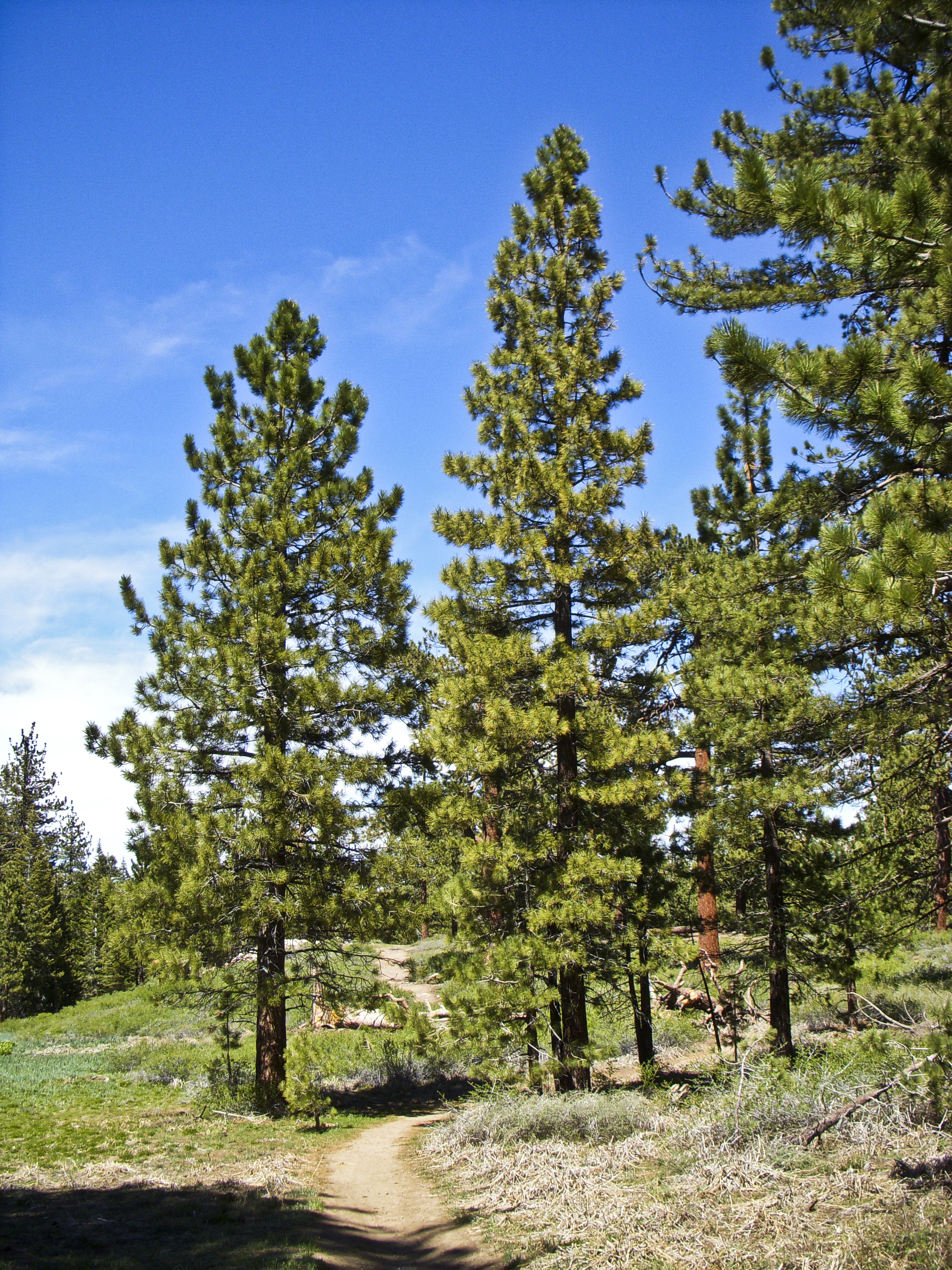
Pinus jeffreyi

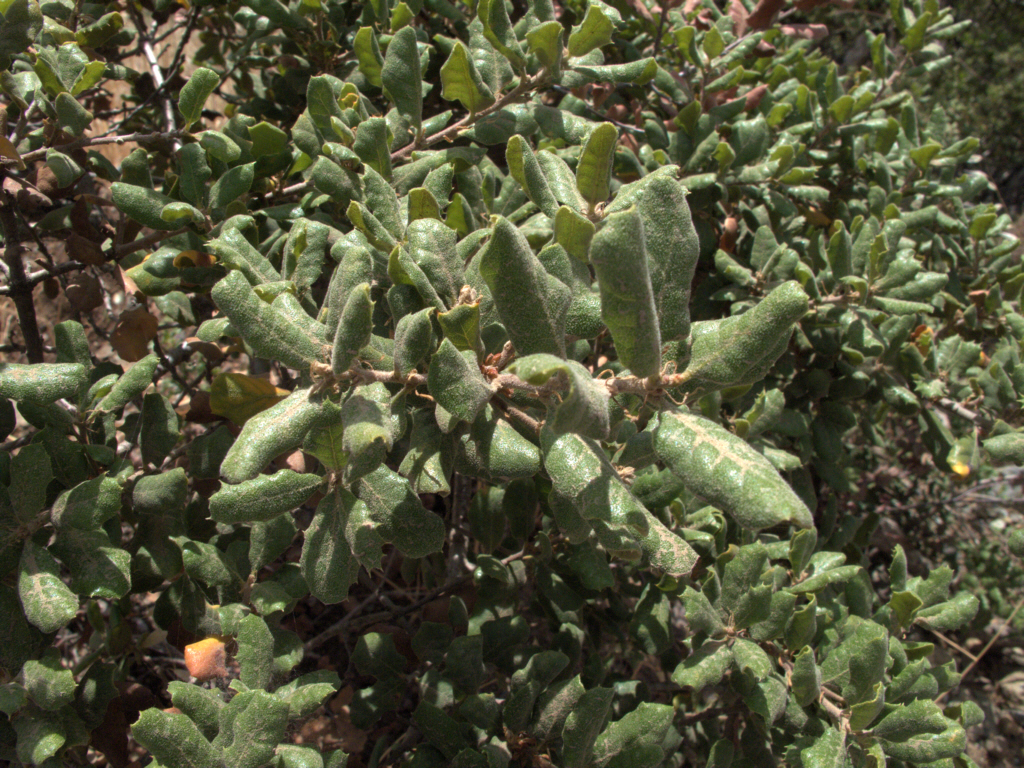
Quercus durata

== Fauna ==
Over 70 species of mammals occur in this rich ecoregion. The endemic mammals include three species of kangaroo rat: the giant kangaroo rat (Dipodomys ingens), Heermann's kangaroo rat (Dipodomys heermani), and narrow-faced kangaroo rat (Dipodomys venustus). The salt marsh harvest mouse (Reithrodontomys raviventris) is also included, which is the most populated endemic mammal species in U.S. and Canadian habitats. Some hundred species of birds occur here. Indicator species are scrub jays, acorn woodpeckers, and wrentits. Unusual invertebrate species, such as army ants (Neivamyrmex spp.), primitive bristletails, and land snails, also exist here.

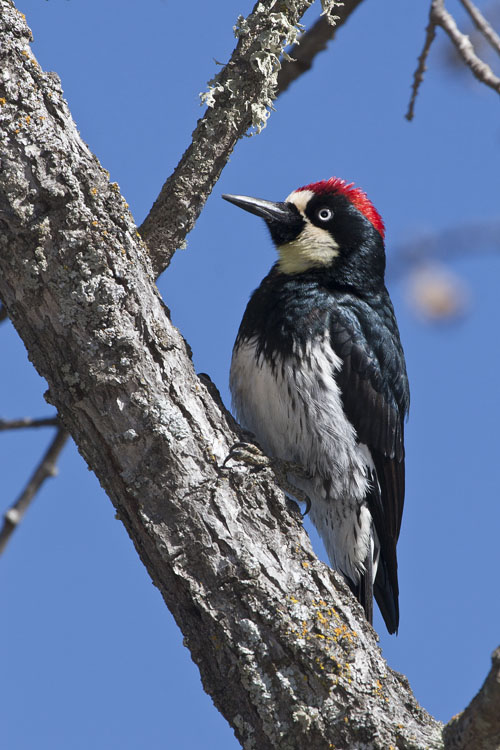
Melanerpes formicivorus

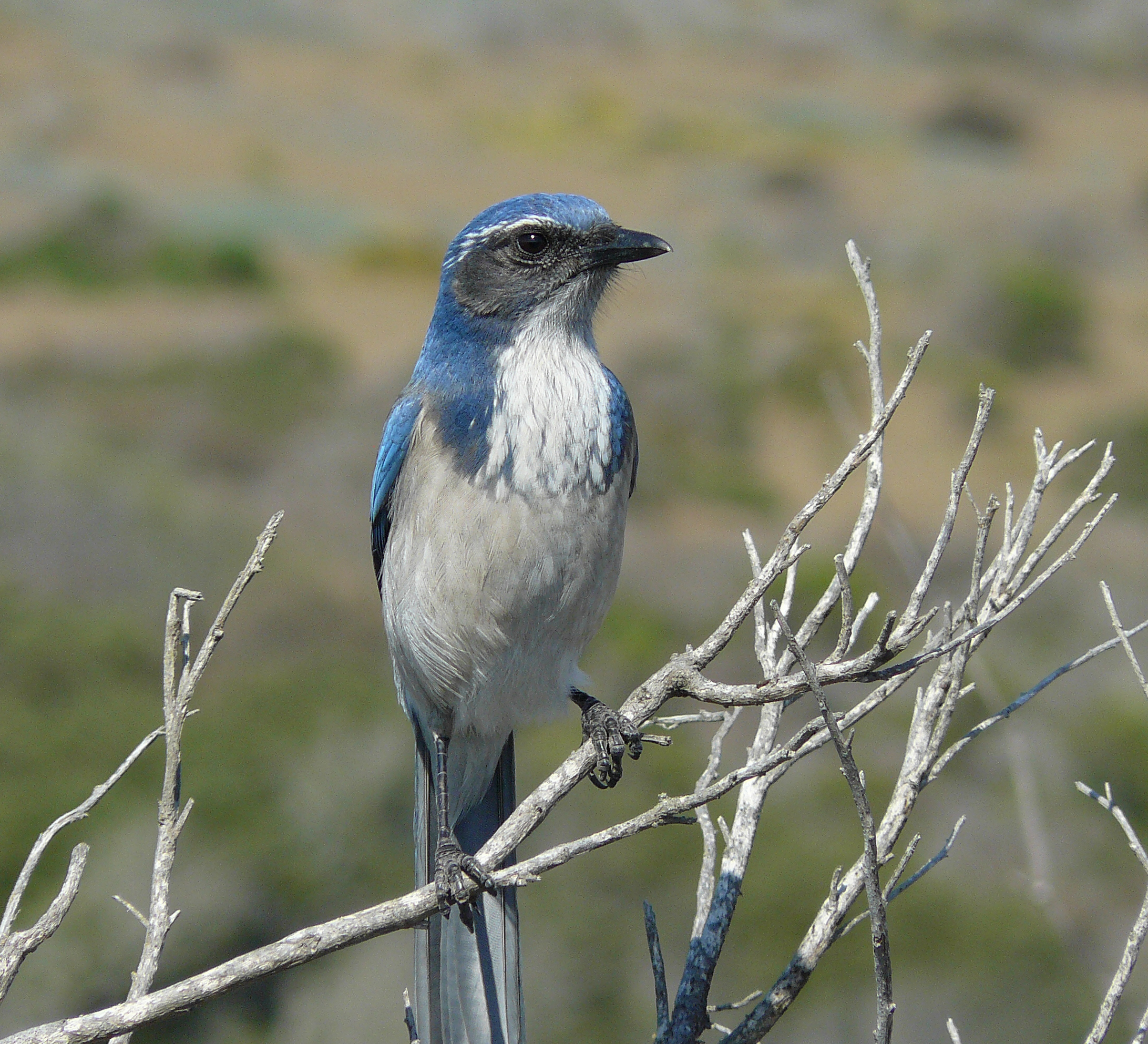
Aphelocoma californica

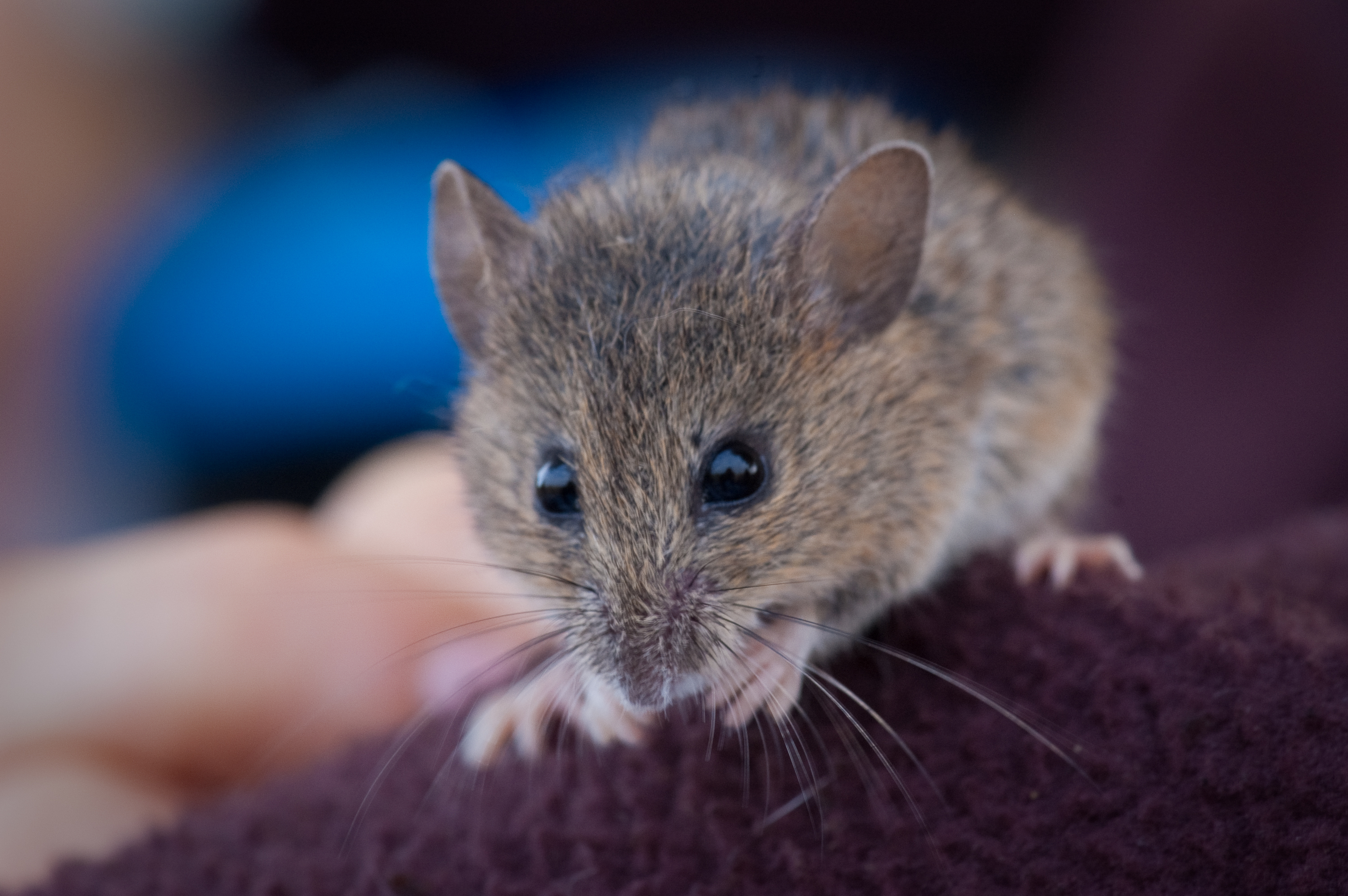
Reithrodontomys raviventris

== Threats and conservation ==
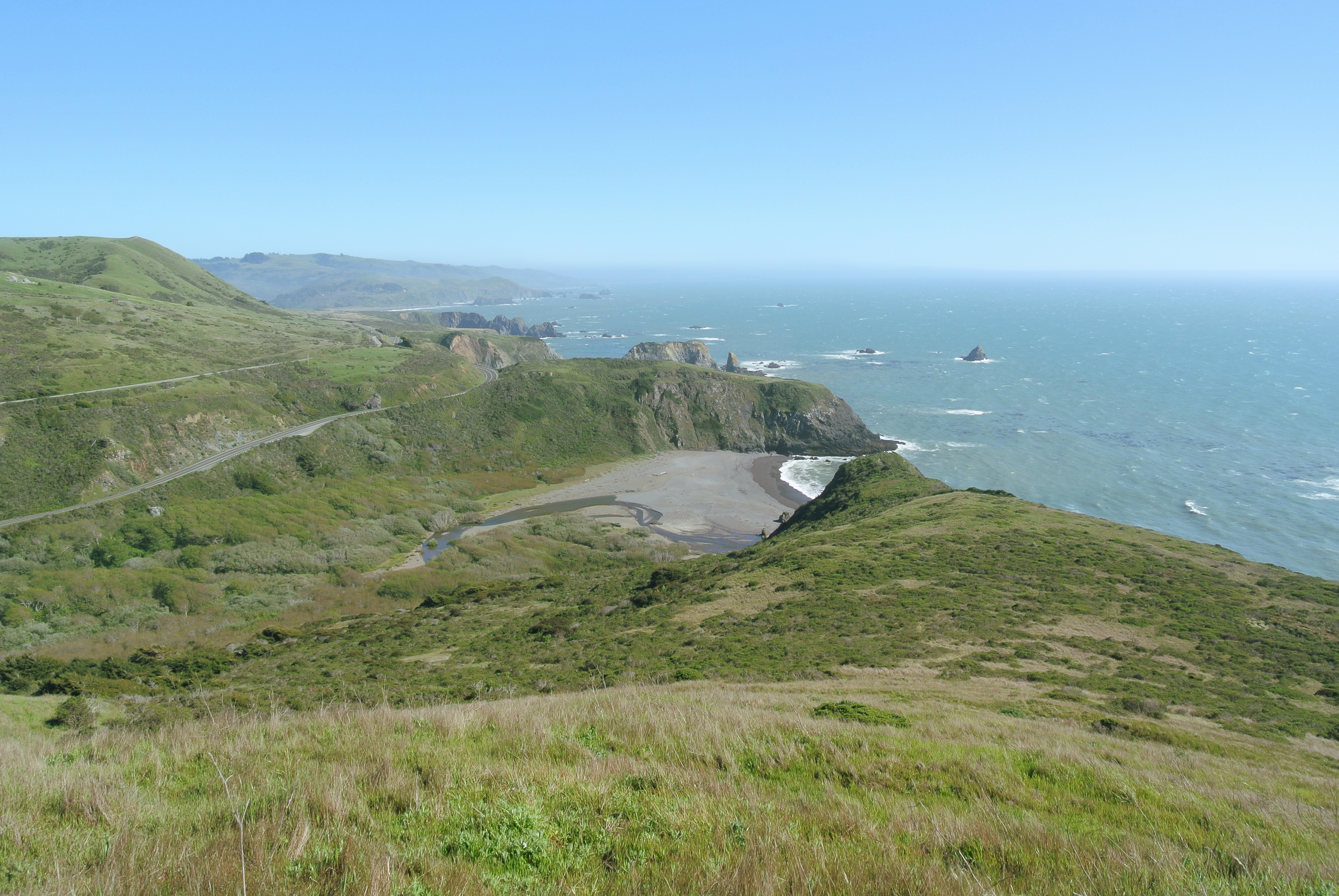
California coastal prairie in Sonoma County

About one third of the original habitat remains, especially at higher elevations. Adapted to periodic fires, many species and communities in the ecoregion are highly fire resilient and there are many species which regenerate by fires. The trees of Closed-cone pine forest burned in every 25–50 years, and a few species including the knobcone pine (Pinus attenuata) are adapted to open the cones and release seeds for new growth following the heat of forest fires. However, as fire regulation and suppression becomes more effective these communities cannot renew themselves.

Although the chaparral is widely considered "fire-dependent", this is a misconception. Varying factors including the species present, angle and direction of the slope on which the chaparral grows, and local climate conditions affect how well the environment is able to respond to fire, along with the frequency, intensity, and seasonality of the fire. One common factor among chaparral, however, is that a minimum of 10 years is needed between fires for the chaparral to mature and set enough seed in the soil to create a fire resilient environment. The effects of fire frequency on chaparral recovery depend on previous fire history and local environmental conditions. A satellite-based study in Southern California found that short intervals between two fires did not always lead to reduced shrub recovery. Nevertheless, sites that experienced three fires within 25 years had lower recovery.Another study, where they used historical aerial photographs, found that frequent fires had an association with the gradual replacement of native shrubs by grasses and other herbaceous plants. In addition, soil moisture and topography has an impact on the extent of these changes. Similarly, a research in Northern California's Interior Coast Range found that areas burned with higher frequency had lower rates of native shrub regeneration and lower plant diversity. Therefore, the studies show that short-term recovery after fires have different processes from long-term changes in vegetation composition. As a result, instead of following one recovery threshold, the effects of repeated fires vary among the chaparral communities. As human activity increases the frequency of fires, the chaparral's ability to renew itself decreases, leading to elimination and degradation. Moreover, non-native grasses will invade burned areas, making it increasingly difficult for healthy chaparral to grow.

A new leadership intent to protect chaparral has been established by the United States Forest Service to combat the increased rate of fires in the chaparral. California state policy has also recognized the need to protect the chaparral vegetation threatened by the fires.

Other threats to the ecoregion include development, overgrazing, conversion to annual grasses, and invasive species. Invasive grasses often appear as the result of fires or human development in chaparral.

Protected areas of the ecoregion include: American River Parkway, Berryessa Snow Mountain National Monument, Point Reyes National Seashore, Mount Tamalpais State Park, Mount Diablo State Park, Henry W. Coe State Park, Pinnacles National Park, Folsom Lake State Recreation Area and Carrizo Plain National Monument.

== See also ==
- List of ecoregions in the United States (WWF)
