= Tutu (plant) =

New Zealand plants in the genus Coriaria

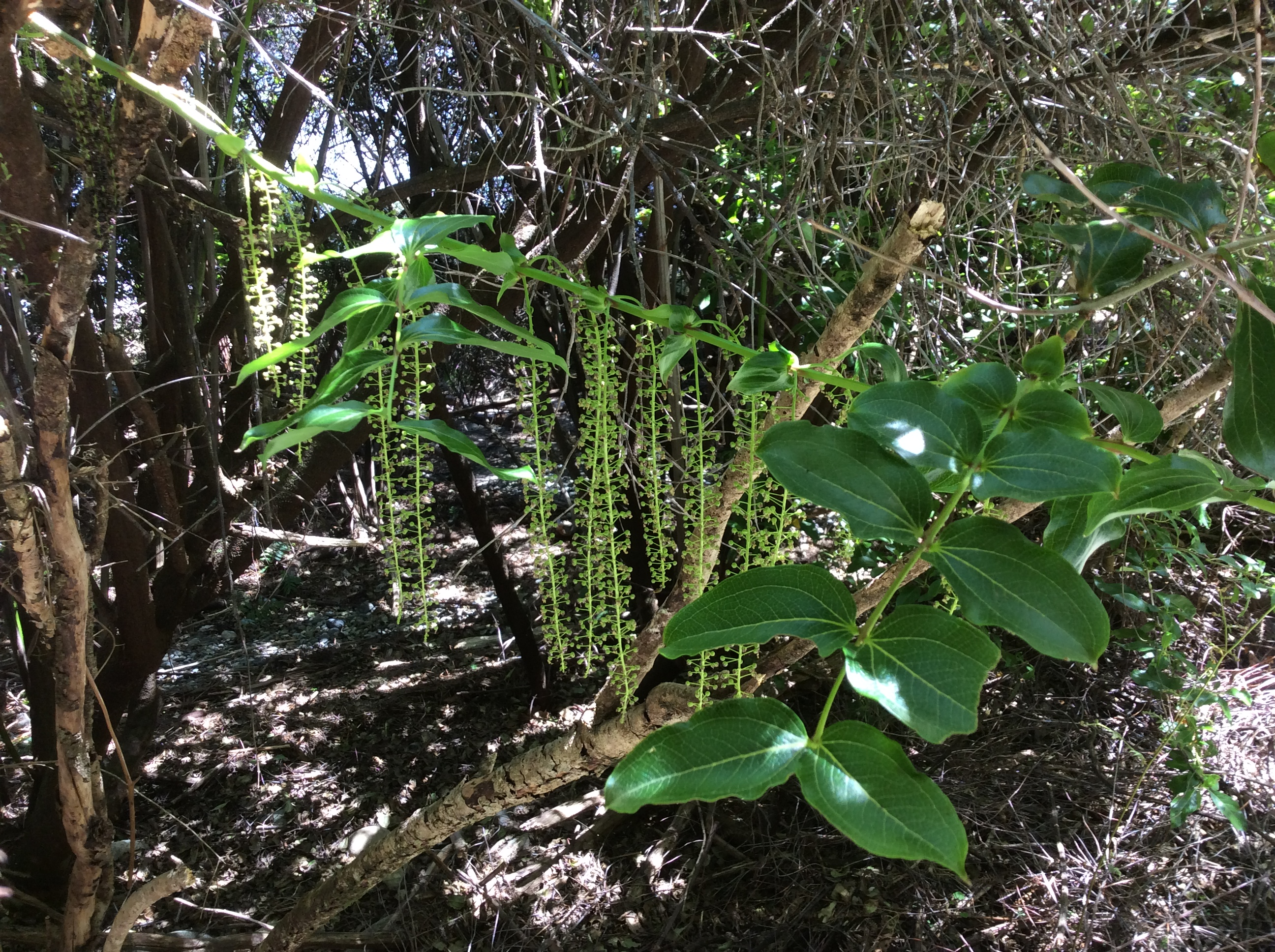
A Coriaria arborea tree (tutu)

Tutu is a common name of Māori origin for plants in the genus Coriaria found in New Zealand.

== Name ==
The Māori language name tutu has cognates found in other Eastern Polynesian languages such as Tahitian and Cook Islands Māori which use the word to describe Colubrina asiatica, a plant that has visual similarity to Coriaria. Tutu is also colloquially known as toot in New Zealand.

== Taxonomy ==
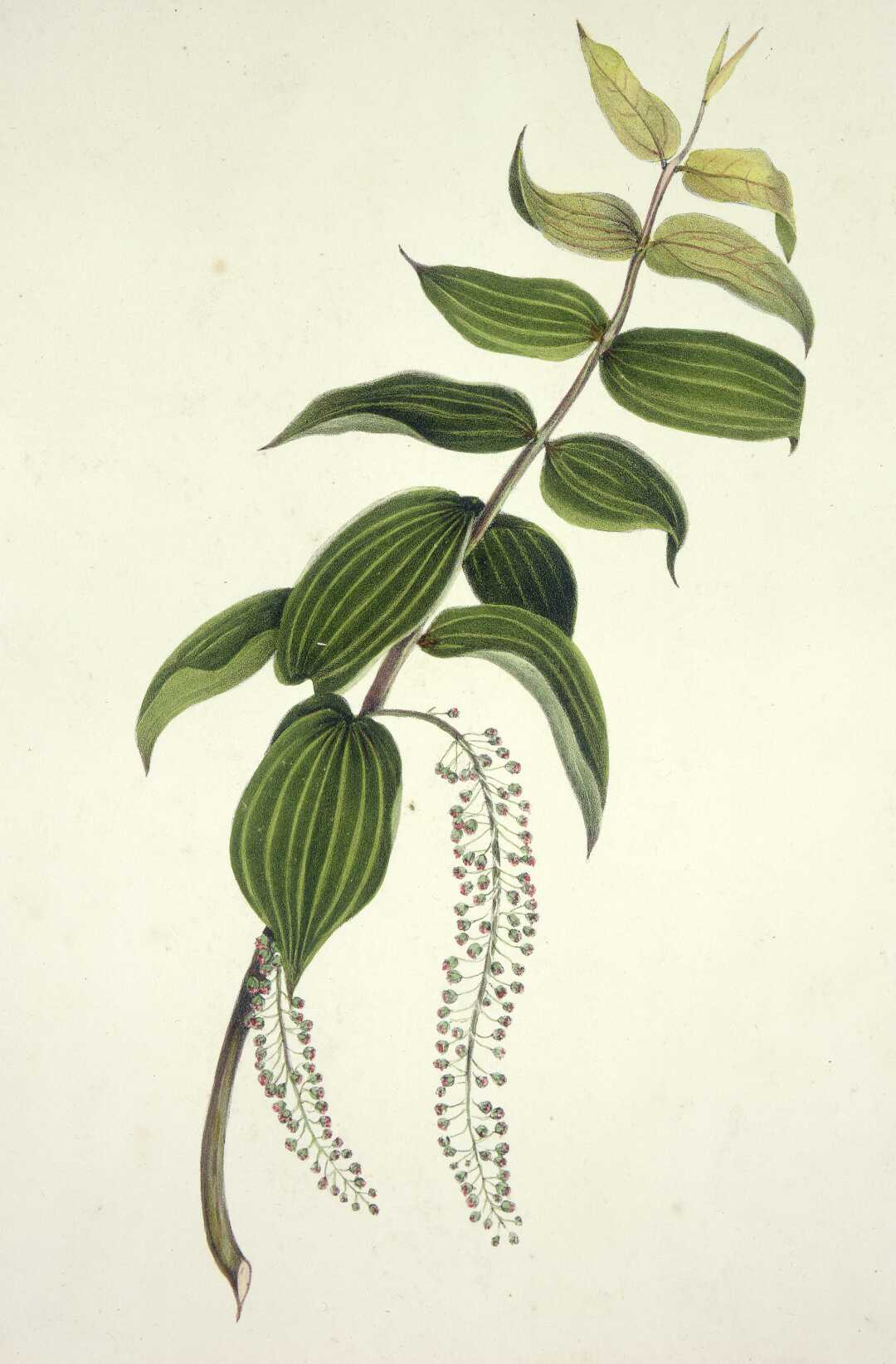
1842 botanical drawing of Coriaria arborea by Martha King

Eight New Zealand native species are known by the name:

- Coriaria angustissima
- Coriaria arborea
- Coriaria kingiana
- Coriaria lurida
- Coriaria plumosa
- Coriaria pottsiana
- Coriaria pteridoides
- Coriaria sarmentosa

== Description ==
They are shrubs or trees; some are endemic to New Zealand. Most of the plant parts are poisonous, containing the neurotoxin tutin and its derivative hyenanchin.

== Toxicity ==
The widespread species Coriaria arborea is most often linked to cases of poisoning. Most of the plant except for the flesh of the fruit is toxic, including the seeds found within the fruit. Ingesting tutu berries was linked with many deaths of children during the early European settlement of New Zealand, as well as livestock deaths.

Honey containing tutin can be produced by honey bees feeding on honeydew produced by sap-sucking vine hopper insects (genus Scolypopa) feeding on tutu. The last recorded deaths from eating honey containing tutin were in the 1890s, although sporadic outbreaks of toxic honey poisoning continue to occur. Poisoning symptoms include delirium, vomiting, and coma.

== Food, medical and musical uses ==
Tutu has a variety of food, medical and musical uses in traditional Māori culture. The berries were carefully filtered to remove the seeds to create waitutu, one of the few pre-European beverages in New Zealand. After European contact, tutu wine became a drink popular with many missionaries.

In rongoā Māori traditional medicinal practices, the filtered juice was used as a laxative.

Wood from large tutu trees was on occasion used to make kōauau flutes. Playing these instruments would cause the player to be mildly poisoned. This application of the poison may have been an intentional effect to create a spiritual or heightened experience.
