= Caloptilia elaeas =

Scientific classification
- Kingdom: Animalia
- Phylum: Arthropoda
- Clade: Pancrustacea
- Class: Insecta
- Order: Lepidoptera
- Family: Gracillariidae
- Genus: Caloptilia
- Species: C. elaeas

Binomial name
- Caloptilia elaeas (Meyrick, 1911)

Synonyms
- Gracilaria elaeas Meyrick, 1911

Species of moth endemic to New Zealand

Caloptilia elaeas is a moth of the family Gracillariidae. This species was first described by Edward Meyrick in 1911. It is endemic to New Zealand and is found in both the North and South Islands. This species inhabits open or scrubby terrain where its larval host is found. It has also been observed in subalpine terrain up to 3,500 feet (1,100 m). Larvae feed on Coriaria species, first mining the leaves and then rolling leaves in which the larvae pupate. Adults are on the wing from October until May.

== Taxonomy ==
Arthur Gardiner Butler illustrated the female of this species in 1877 believing it to C. linearis. This species was first formally described by Edward Meyrick using 12 specimens he bred from larvae collected at Castle Hill in January and that matured in February. Meyrick originally named the species Gracilaria elaeas. George Hudson discussed and illustrated this species under this name in his 1928 book The butterflies and moths of New Zealand. In 1988 John S. Dugdale placed this species in the genus Caloptilia. The male lectotype is held at the Natural History Museum, London.

== Description ==
Male lectotype.

Meyrick described the adults of species as follows:

♂♀. 12-14 mm. Head and thorax light-brownish, more or less mixed or suffused with whitish. Palpi rather stout, whitish, terminal joint suffused externally with dark grey. Antennae whitish ringed with dark fuscous. Abdomen grey. Forewings very narrow, elongate-lanceolate ; brownish-ochreous with a strong brassy-yellowish gloss ; in one specimen the wing is suffused with deep purple, except a moderate dorsal streak and costal edge ; more or less numerous variable deep purple-fuscous dots arranged along fold, and in an irregular longitudinal series above middle ; some dark purple-fuscous irroration towards apex : cilia brownish-ochreous, on an apical bar sprinkled with dark fuscous. Hindwings and cilia grey.

Meyrick originally thought this species was identical to C. linearis but recognised that it was a distinct species in 1911 as C. elaeas has grey hindwings.

Hudson described the larva of this species as follows:

... the larva has fourteen legs, is moderately stout, cylindrical, tapering at both ends; dull grey-greenish or grey-yellowish; the dorsal line is darker; the sub-dorsal line broad grey or obsolete and the head and plate on second segment dark brown.

== Distribution ==
This species is endemic to New Zealand. It has been observed in both the North and the South Islands.

== Habitat and hosts ==
C. elaeas frequents in open or scrubby habitat where is host plants are found. It has also been collected at altitudes of up to 3,500 feet (1,100 m) in mountainous habitat. The larvae of this species feed on Coriaria plumosa, mining and folding the leaves. The larvae pupate in the rolled leaf. It is likely that larvae of this species also feed on other small leaved Coriaria species.

Meyrick stated that the larvae he collected to bred the specimens he used to describe the species were collected from Coriaria ruscifolia and Coriaria angustissima. Other probable hosts include Coriaria arborea, Coriaria lurida and Coriaria sarmentosa. Species in the genus Coriaria are highly toxic. Dugdale hypothesised that C. elaeas feed on summer-green Coriaria species.

== Behaviour ==
C. elaeas at rest.

Adults are most commonly observed on the wing from November until February. However the species has been observed from October until May. When at rest, adults adopt a raised head posture.
