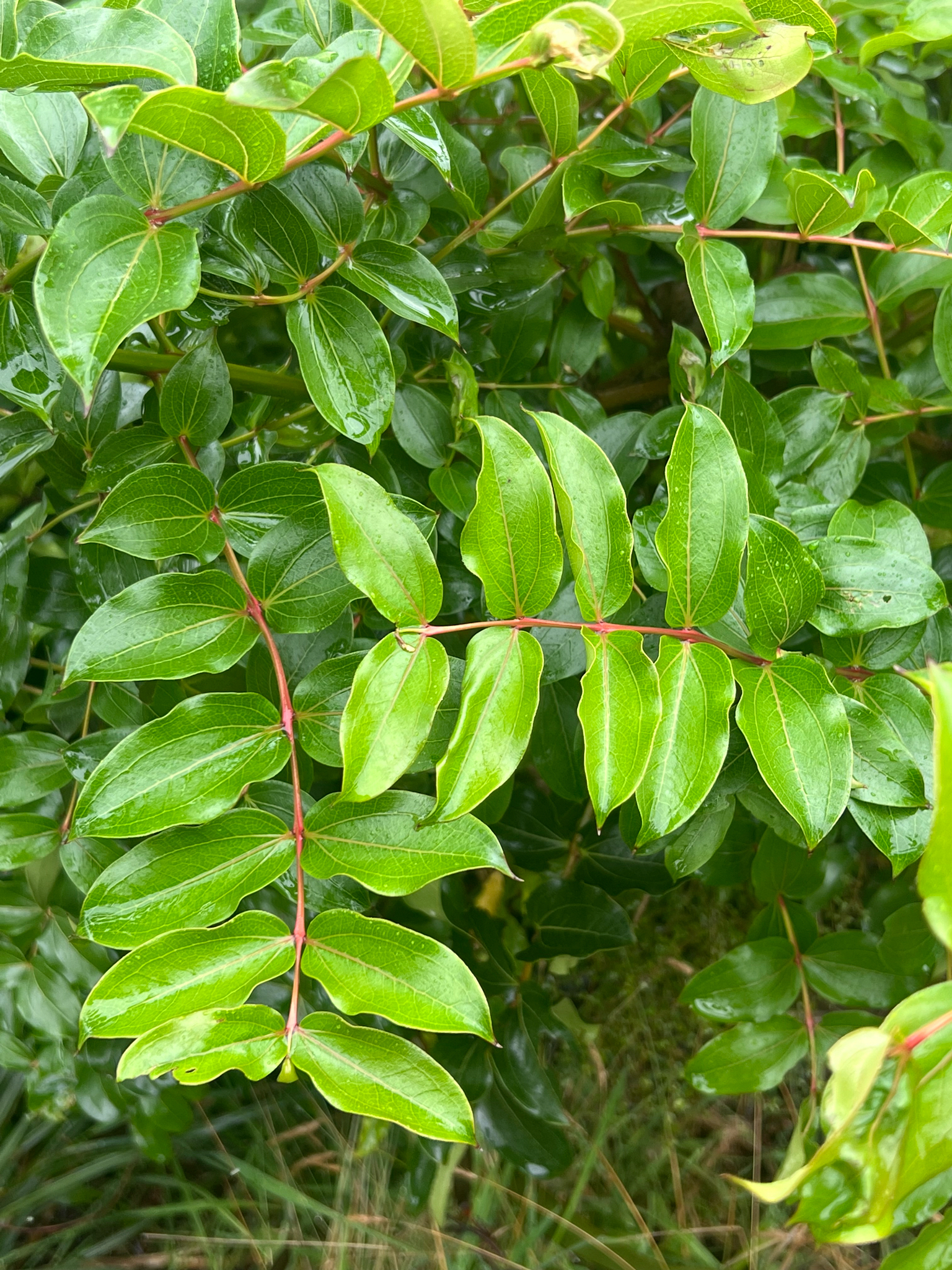
- Foliage of Coriaria arborea

Conservation status
- Not Threatened (NZ TCS)

Scientific classification
- Kingdom: Plantae
- Clade: Tracheophytes
- Clade: Angiosperms
- Clade: Eudicots
- Clade: Rosids
- Order: Cucurbitales
- Family: Coriariaceae
- Genus: Coriaria
- Species: C. arborea

Binomial name
- Coriaria arborea Linds.

= Coriaria arborea =

Species of flowering plant

Coriaria arborea, commonly known as tutu and tree tutu, is a species of shrub or small tree in the family Coriariaceae. It is endemic to New Zealand. Every part of C. arborea, except the juice of the fruits, contains the toxin tutin, which is highly poisonous to humans and livestock. Poisonings can result in brain paralysis, convulsions, exhaustion, memory loss, or even death. C. arborea is a bushy shrub which can grow to a height of 7 metres (23 feet). C. arborea is able to colonise new areas of moist ground, and can be found on debris fans, glacial moraine, and stream banks.

The plant was first described in 1868 by Scottish botanist William Lauder Lindsay. There are seven New Zealand members of the Coriaria genus. C. arborea's pollination strategy is uncertain, although a 2025 source argured it is pollinated by the wind. Its seeds are dispersed by fruit-eating animals (frugivores), such as birds and lizards. A nitrogen-fixating plant, C. arborea helps enrich soil quality. The indigenous Māori were able to juice the fruits, filtering them through toetoe (Austroderia sp.) to remove the toxic seeds. C. arborea's 2023 assessment in the New Zealand Threat Classification System was "Not Threatened".

== Description ==
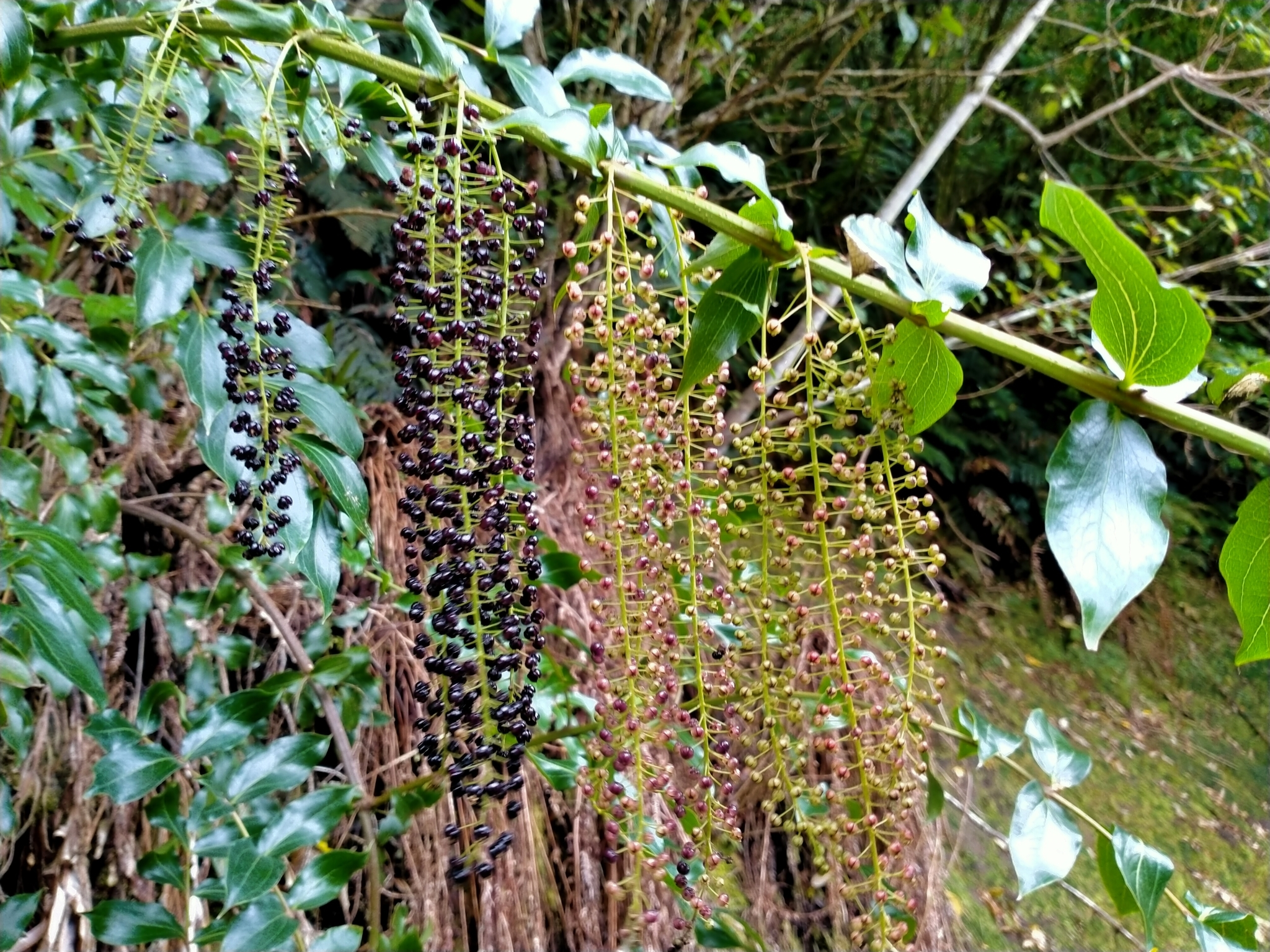
Hanging fruit clusters of C. arborea

Coriaria arborea is a shrub or small tree in the family Coriariaceae. It is a bushy with spreading branches which usually grows to a height of 3–4 metres (10–10 feet), although it can grow to a height of up to 7 m (23 ft) with a cylindrical and erect trunk up to 3 m (10 ft), which has a diameter of 30 cm (10 in). The trunk and branches have greyish to dark brown coloured bark. In spring, C. arborea produces long unbranched shoots which will later develop leafy lateral branchlets (small newly grown branches). These shoots are comparable to asparagus, but they are much larger.

Leaves are mostly arranged oppositely in two rows along the branchlets. They are smooth, slightly coriaceous (leather-like) texture, and are dark green in colour. The upper surface is glossy, while the underside is paler. The laminae (leaf blades) are egg-shaped with pointed tips, and the leaves have a slightly wavy margins.

Flowering occurs from October to March. The flowers are arranged along hanging, unbranched inflorescences (flower clusters) which grow to up to 20–30 cm (7.9–11.8 in) long. Each individual flower is small, greenish-yellow in colour, and only about 2–3 mm in diameter. There are five sepals and petals on each flower. Fruiting occurs from November to April, the fruits ripen to a somewhat purple-black colour. They are fleshy, spherical in shape, and approximately 4 mm long. C. arborea has a diploid chromosome count of 40.

== Taxonomy ==
- - - - C. terminalis (Central Asia)
      - C. myrtifolia (Mediterranean)
    - C. nepalensis (Central Asia)
  - - C. japonica (Japan)
    - C. intermedia (Taiwan, Philippines)
  - - C. microphylla (Central America)
    - - - C. papuana (Papua New Guinea)
        - Coriaria sp.
      - - C. arborea (New Zealand)
        - - C. ruscifolia (South America)
          - - - C. sarmentosa (New Zealand)
              - C. lurida (New Zealand)

Phylogenetic tree of Coriaria based on rbcL and matK data from Yokoyama et al. (2000).
Group 1 of Coriaria (Eurasia)
Group 2 of Coriaria (Pacific islands and Americas)

The species was first described by Scottish botanist William Lauder Lindsay in 1868. Coriaria has one of the most disjunct distribution areas in the world, which makes it one of the most unusual genera among flowering plants. There are seven New Zealand members of the Coriaria genus. This genus is sparingly found in four main distribution areas in the world, and occurs in the Mediterranean Basin, East Asia, Papua New Guinea, New Zealand, and some parts in the Americas. Good (1930) identified three groups within Coriaria, A, B, and C, based on geographic distribution and other morphological characteristics.

The phylogenetic relationships of twelve Coriaria species were studied by a phylogenetic analysis published in 2000 using combined rbcL and matK gene data. The study retained Good's group C, but they instead renamed it to group 2. This group contains C. arborea. They also renamed group A and B to group 1. The phylogenetic tree they produced shows that species from Chile, Papua New Guinea, New Zealand, and the Pacific islands form a sister group with species from Central and northern South America, while the Eurasian species diverged earlier than the others. They estimated the divergence time of the Eurasian group was about 59 or 63 million years ago, although pollen grains of Coriaria first appeared about 82 million years ago.

=== Varieties ===
There are two recognised varieties of Coriaria arborea:

- Coriaria arborea var. arborea — endemic to mainland New Zealand
- Coriaria arborea var. kermadecensis — endemic to the Kermadec Islands

=== Etymology ===
The etymology (word origin) of C. arborea's genus name, Coriaria, derives from the Latin corium meaning 'hide', possibly originating from the use of this genus in leather tanning. The specific epithet (second part of the scientific name), arborea, comes from the Latin arbor, and means 'tree-like'. The species is commonly known as tree tutu, tutu, tree toot, or toot. The Māori language name 'tutu' has cognates (words with shared origin) found in other Eastern Polynesian languages such as Tahitian and Cook Islands Māori which use the word to describe the unrelated Colubrina asiatica, a plant that has visual similarity to Coriaria. The word 'tutu' has been used colloquially as a verb; for example, livestock may be said to have been "tutu'd", meaning poisoned by the tutu plant.

== Ecology ==
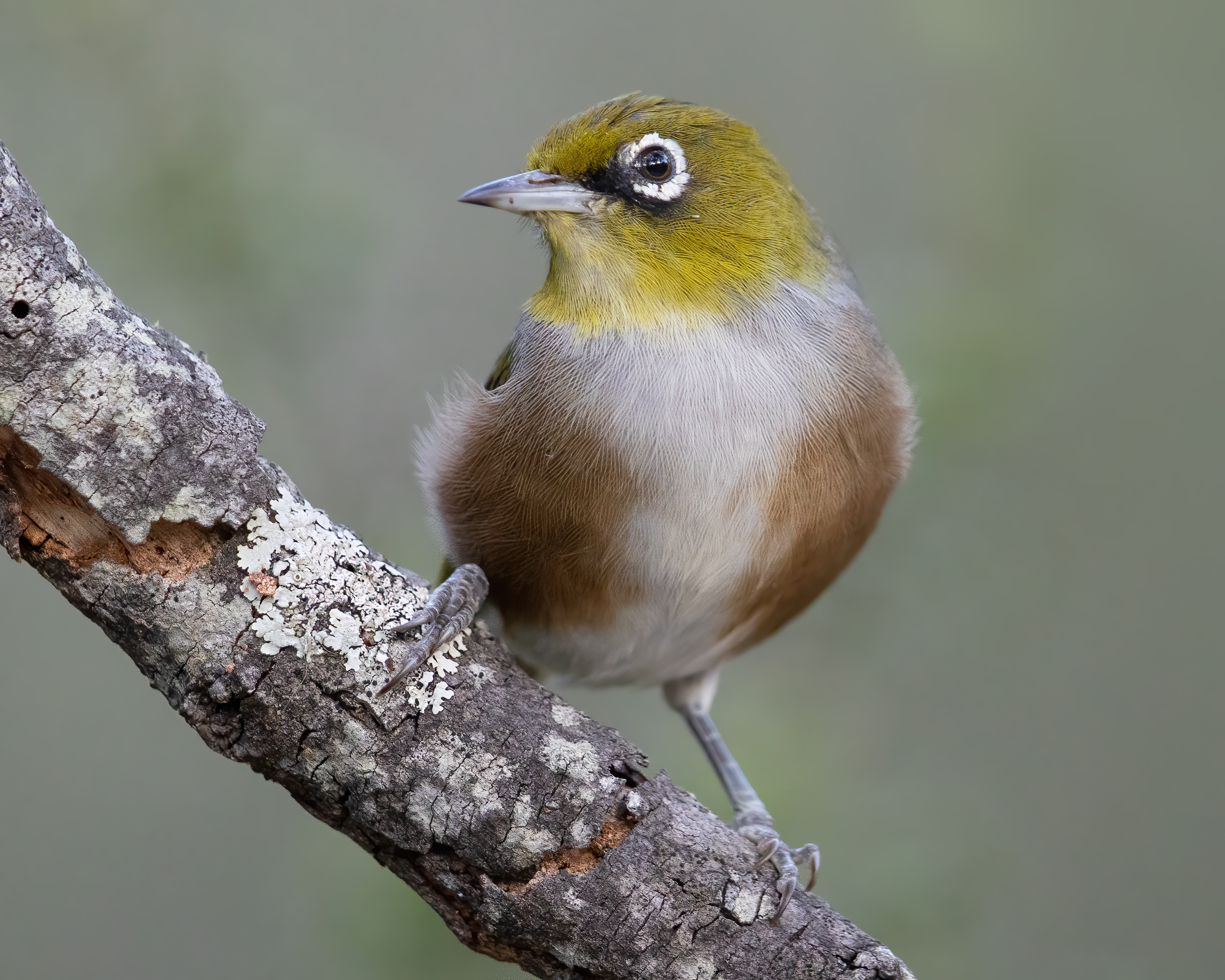
The native silvereye bird consumes the fruits of C. arborea.

Coriaria arborea's seeds are dispersed by fruit-eating animals (frugivores), such as birds and lizards. A 1995 study noted the introduced blackbird (Turdus merula) and the native silvereye (Zosterops lateralis) ate the fruits of C. arborea. Other birds which are known to consume the fruits of C. arborea include the kererū (Hemiphaga novaeseelandiae) and New Zealand bellbirds (Anthornis melanura). The British botanist Thomas Potts recorded that the now possibly extinct South Island kōkako (Callaeas cinereus) fed on the fruits of Coriaria. German-born New Zealand explorer Julius von Haast recorded that the kākāpō (Strigops habroptilus), a large flightless parrot, also fed on Coriaria fruits.

New Zealand Coriaria species are either andromonoecious or polygamo-monoecious, meaning they have male, female, and bisexual flowers on the same plant. The pollination strategy of Coriaria is uncertain. Burrows (1995) claimed the flowers are pollinated by birds and insects. Lloyd & Webb (1986) and Thomphson & Gornal (1995) claimed that C. arborea is wind-pollinated, although it is known that bees visit the plant to collect pollen and honeydew. Garnock-Jones (2025) claimed the plant is pollinated by the wind.

Coriaria arborea plays host to numerous insects, including, Hierodoris illita, Scolypopa australis, Pentatoma rufipes, Tatosoma lestevata, Oemona hirta, and various species from the Caloptilia genus. A nitrogen-fixating plant, C. arborea's nodules (specialised root structures) can improve soil quality. These nodules are found on their roots, and they have a relationship with Frankia bacteria. C. arborea can be semideciduous, meaning they partially lose their leaves in winter.

=== Toxins ===
The seeds and leaves of New Zealand Coriaria have the highest concentration of toxins. The primary toxin responsible for C. arborea's toxicity is called tutin. C. arborea is one of New Zealand's deadliest plants. Every part of C. arborea, except the juice from the fruits, contains the toxin, which is highly poisonous to humans and livestock. Ingesting the fruits was linked with many deaths of children during the early European settlement of New Zealand. Poisoning symptoms can include brain paralysis, convulsions, exhaustion, memory loss, or even death. Human poisoning from C. arborea has been rare since 1900, although there was one fatal poisoning recorded in 1989. Vennell (2019) notes that, since 1889, four deaths have been linked to consuming honey contaminated with tutin.

== Distribution ==
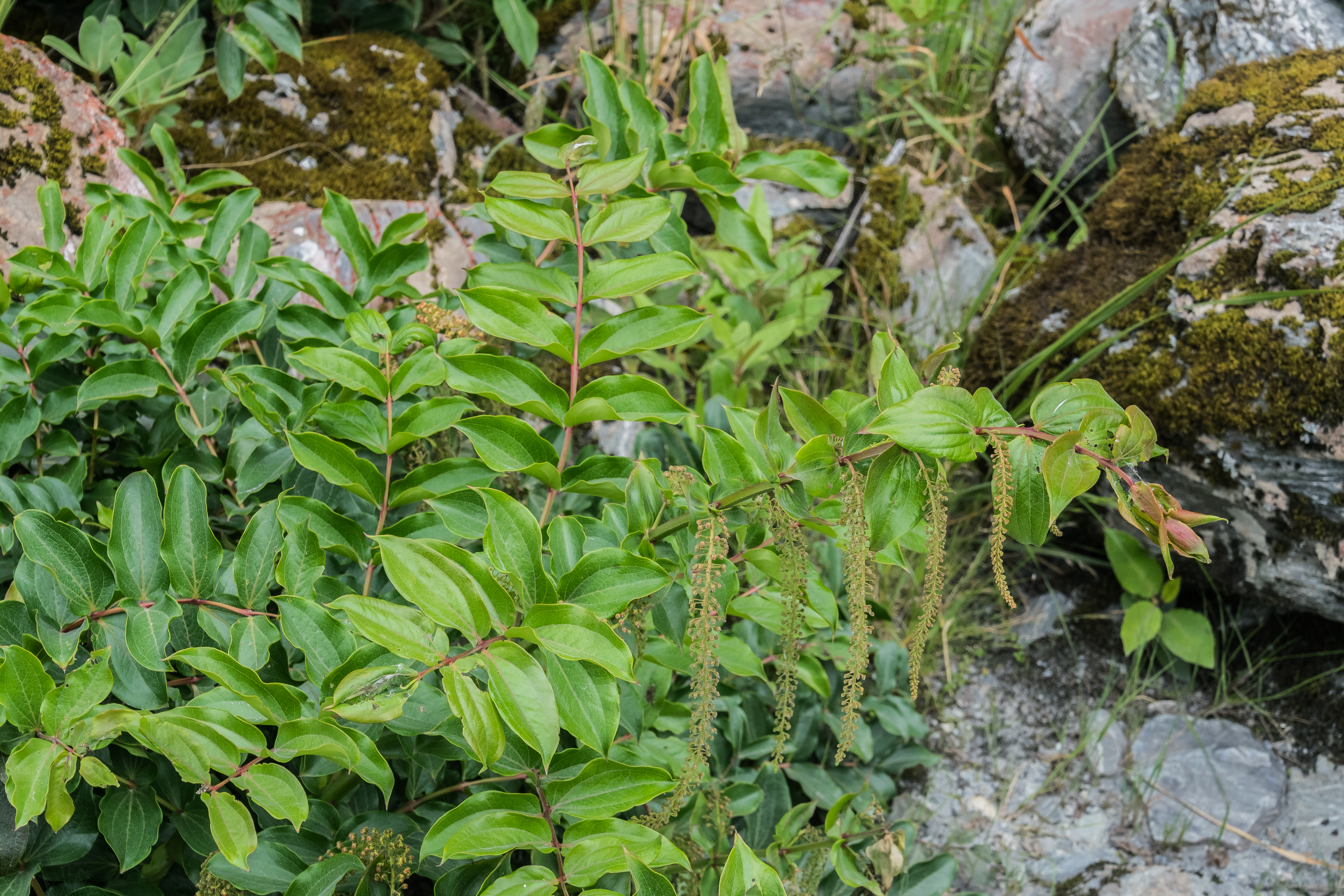
Coriaria arborea in the South Island's Westland Tai Poutini National Park

New Zealand has the highest concentration of Coriaria species. C. arborea is the most common species in New Zealand. C. arborea var. arborea is found throughout the North, South, Stewart, and Chatham Islands. C. arborea var. kermadecensis is endemic to Raoul Island, which is part of the Kermadec Islands chain. C. arborea var. arborea's 2023 conservation status in the New Zealand Threat Classification System was "Not Threatened". Its 2018 asessement in the IUCN Red List was "Least Concern" and its population trend was evaluated as "Stable".

=== Habitat ===
Coriaria species typically occur on sandy soils. C. arborea, a common early successor on moist ground, can be found on alluvial terraces, cliffs, debris fans, glacial moraine, and stream banks. C. arborea can be commonly associated with inanga (Dracophyllum sp.), mountain holly (Olearia macrodonta), putaputawētā (Carpodetus serratus) and wineberry (Aristotelia serrata). C. arborea grows up to 1,000 m (3,300 ft) above sea level. C. arborea prefers moist, well-drained soils. It tolerates frost reasonably well, and is very fast-growing.

== Uses ==
[...] the fruit can only be used by expressing the juice and carefully separating all the seeds. It is the native wine, and when boiled with Rimu, a sea weed, forms a jelly which is very palatable; when fermented, it makes a sort of wine, and it contains so much colouring matter, that it may be used as a dye.

— Richard Taylor, 1847

Coriaria arborea has several recorded Māori names, including tutu, tāweku, tūpākihi, tāwehu, pūhou, pukou, puho, and tuturakau. C. arborea has a variety of food, medicinal and musical uses in traditional Māori culture. Despite the toxicity from most of the plant, indigenous Māori were able to juice the petals after removing the poisonous seeds by filtering them through the flower heads of toetoe (Austroderia sp.). This beverage was called waitutu and was consumed in large quantitues, which was also used as a laxative. This beverage was also fermented into a wine, which was also popular with European settlers.

The leaves and young shoots were used to treat wounds and could be prepared as lotions. They were a valuable medicinal resource, with leaf infusions applied to sprains, strains, and even broken bones. The stems of larger plants were crafted into flutes, and the juice was painted on warriors' faces before battles.

== Works cited ==
Books

- Crowe, Andrew (2009). Which Native Forest Plant?. Auckland, New Zealand: Penguin Books. ISBN 978-0-14-300901-6.
- Dawson, John; Lucas, Rob; Connor, Jane; Brownsey, P. J. (2011). New Zealand's Native Trees. Nelson, New Zealand: Potton & Burton. ISBN 978-1-877517-01-3.
- Garnock-Jones, Philip (2025). He Puāwai. Auckland, New Zealand: Auckland University Press. ISBN 978-1-77671-168-0.
- Vennell, Robert (2019). The Meaning of Trees. Auckland, New Zealand: HarperCollins. ISBN 978-1-77554-130-1.
- Wardle, J. (2011). Wardle's Native Plants of New Zealand and Their Story. Bateson Publishing Limited. ISBN 9781877520068.

Journals

- Belcher, SF; Morton, TR (2013). "Tutu toxicity: three case reports of Coriaria arborea ingestion, review of literature and recommendations for management". The New Zealand Medical Journal. 126 (1370). New Zealand Medical Journal. ISSN 1175-8716.
- Burrows, C. J. (1995). "Germination behaviour of the seeds of four New Zealand species of Coriaria (Coriariaceae)". New Zealand Journal of Botany. 33 (2): 265–275. doi:10.1080/0028825X.1995.10410489. ISSN 0028-825X.
- Butz Huryn, Vivian M. (1995). "Use of native New Zealand plants by honey bees (Apis mellifera L.): A review". New Zealand Journal of Botany. 33 (4): 497–512. doi:10.1080/0028825X.1995.10410621. ISSN 0028-825X.
- Dimsey, Heath W.; Perkins, Inger; Maher, Cooper; Stratemeier, Julian; Bode, Michael (2026). "Inferring the extinction status of the South Island Kōkako from sighting records". Emu - Austral Ornithology. 126 (1): 57–64. doi:10.1080/01584197.2025.2598306. ISSN 0158-4197.
- Good, R. D'O. (1930). "The Geography of the Genus Coriaria". The New Phytologist. 29 (3). New Phytologist Trust: 170–198. ISSN 0028-646X. JSTOR 2428353.
- Lindsay, W Lauder (1868). "On the Properties and Products of the Toot Plant of New Zealand". The British and Foreign Medico-Chirurgical Review. 42 (84). PMID 30163132.
- O'Donnell, Colin F.J.; Dilks, Peter J. (1994). "Foods and Foraging of Forest Birds in Temperate Rainforest, South Westland, New Zealand". New Zealand Journal of Ecology. 18 (2). New Zealand Ecological Society: 87–107. ISSN 0110-6465. JSTOR 24066768.
- Lloyd, David G.; Webb, C. J. (1986). "The avoidance of interference between the presentation of pollen and stigmas in angiosperms I. Dichogamy". New Zealand Journal of Botany. 24 (1): 135–162. doi:10.1080/0028825X.1986.10409725. ISSN 0028-825X.
- McGlone, Matt S.; Dungan, Roger J.; Hall, Graeme M.J.; Allen, Robert B. (2004). "Winter leaf loss in the New Zealand woody flora". New Zealand Journal of Botany. 42 (1): 1–19. doi:10.1080/0028825X.2004.9512887. ISSN 0028-825X.
- Renner, Susanne S.; Barreda, Viviana D.; Tellería, María Cristina; Palazzesi, Luis; Schuster, Tanja M. (2020). "Early evolution of Coriariaceae (Cucurbitales) in light of a new early Campanian (ca. 82 Mya) pollen record from Antarctica". Taxon. 69 (1): 87–99. doi:10.1002/tax.12203. ISSN 0040-0262.
- Sopow, Stephanie L.; Bain, John (2017). "A checklist of New Zealand Cerambycidae (Insecta: Coleoptera), excluding Lamiinae". New Zealand Entomologist. 40 (2): 55–71. Bibcode:2017NZEnt..40...55S. doi:10.1080/00779962.2017.1357423. ISSN 0077-9962.
- Thompson, Peter N.; Gornall, Richard J. (1995). "Breeding systems in Coriaria (Coriariaceae)". Botanical Journal of the Linnean Society. 117 (4): 293–304. doi:10.1111/j.1095-8339.1995.tb02592.x.
- Yokoyama, Jun; Suzuki, Mitsuo; Iwatsuki, Kunio; Hasebe, Mitsuyasu (2000). "Molecular Phylogeny of Coriaria, with Special Emphasis on the Disjunct Distribution". Molecular Phylogenetics and Evolution. 14 (1). Elsevier BV: 11–19. doi:10.1006/mpev.1999.0672. ISSN 1055-7903.

Websites

- De Lange, Peter (2026). "Coriaria arborea var. arborea". New Zealand Plant Conservation Network. Archived from the original on 13 February 2026.
- Wassilieff, Maggy (1 March 2009). "Poisonous plants and fungi – Poisonous native plants". Te Ara: The Encyclopedia of New Zealand.
- "Coriaria arborea". IUCN Red List of Threatened Species. 2018 e.T135793736A135793738. 2018. doi:10.2305/IUCN.UK.2018-2.RLTS.T135793736A135793738.en.
- "Coriaria arborea Linds". Plants of the World Online. Archived from the original on 8 July 2025 – via Royal Botanic Gardens, Kew.
- "Ngā Rauropi Whakaoranga — Coriaria arborea. C. sarmentosa. Tutu". Manaaki Whenua – Landcare Research. 2023. Archived from the original on 22 February 2025.
