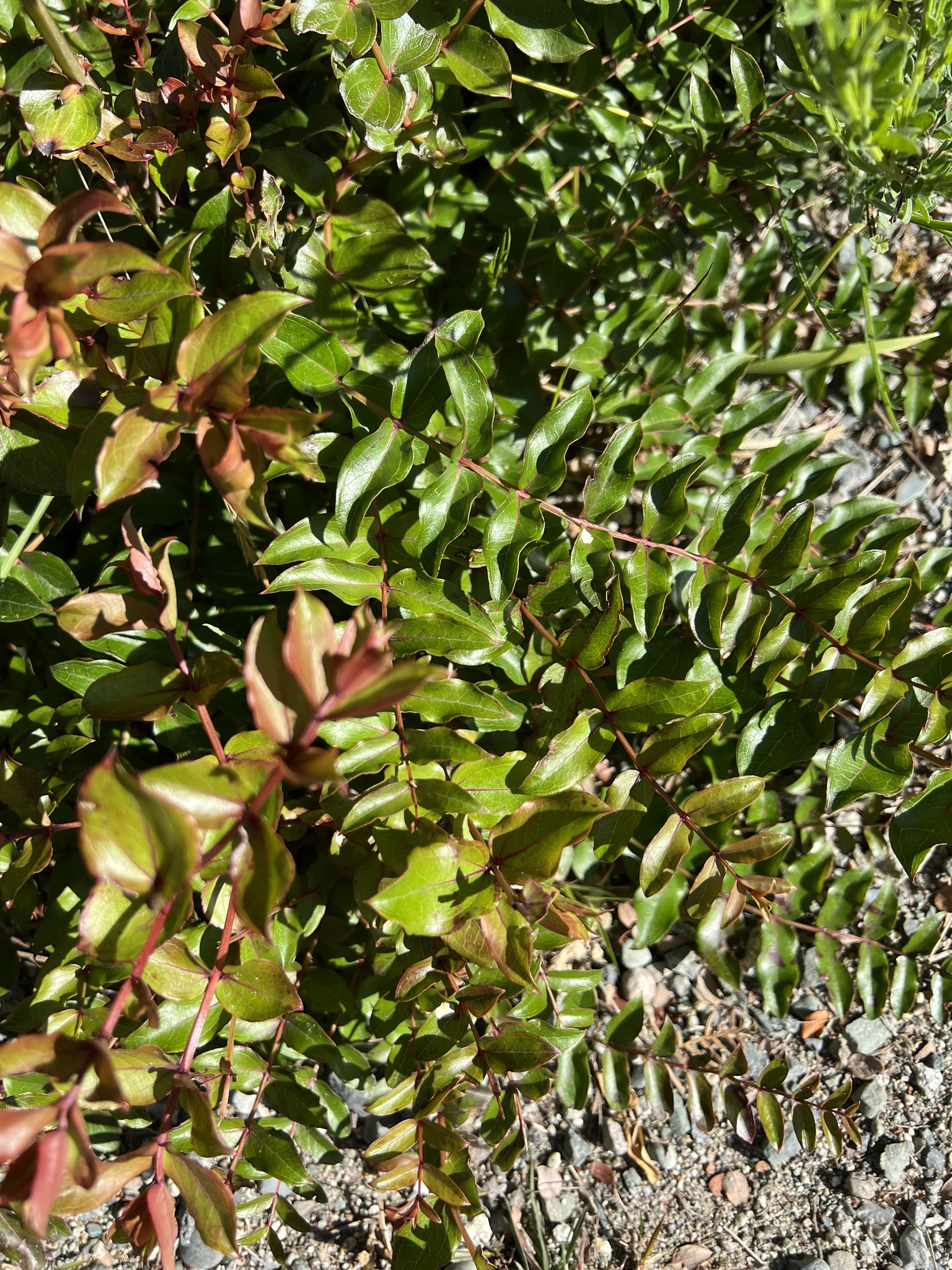
- Foliage of C. sarmentosa

Conservation status
- Not Threatened (NZ TCS)

Scientific classification
- Kingdom: Plantae
- Clade: Tracheophytes
- Clade: Angiosperms
- Clade: Eudicots
- Clade: Rosids
- Order: Cucurbitales
- Family: Coriariaceae
- Genus: Coriaria
- Species: C. sarmentosa

Binomial name
- Coriaria sarmentosa G.Forst.

= Coriaria sarmentosa =

Species of flowering plant

Coriaria sarmentosa, commonly known as tutu, grassland tutu, and ground tutu, is a species of shrub in the family Coriariaceae. It is endemic to New Zealand. This species is common in grasslands and shrublands. It was first described by the German botanist Georg Forster in 1786. This species, and all Coriaria species, are poisonous, especially the seeds. C. sarmentosa's 2023 assessment in the New Zealand Threat Classification System was "Not Threatened"

== Description ==
Coriaria sarmentosa is a robust shrub in the family Coriariaceae. It usually reaches a height of 1 metre (3 feet 3 inches), and consists of many erect or spreading branches, and it reaches a diameter of 4 m (13 ft) long. It has glossy green pointed leaves, which are 40–50 mm long. The flowers are arranged in a spike which is about 8 cm (3.1 in) in length. Fruit is dark purple in colour. This species, and all Coriaria species, are poisonous, especially the seeds. C. sarmentosa has a diploid chromosome count of 80.

== Taxonomy ==
- - - - C. terminalis (Central Asia)
      - C. myrtifolia (Mediterranean)
    - C. nepalensis (Central Asia)
  - - C. japonica (Japan)
    - C. intermedia (Taiwan, Philippines)
  - - C. microphylla (Central America)
    - - - C. papuana (Papua New Guinea)
        - Coriaria sp.
      - - C. arborea (New Zealand)
        - - C. ruscifolia (South America)
          - - - C. sarmentosa (New Zealand)
              - C. lurida (New Zealand)

Phylogenetic tree of Coriaria based on rbcL and matK data from Yokoyama et al. (2000).
Group 1 of Coriaria (Eurasia)
Group 2 of Coriaria (Pacific islands and Americas)

Coriaria sarmentosa was first described by the German botanist Georg Forster in 1786. Coriaria has one of the most disjunct distribution areas in the world, which makes it one of the most unusual genera among flowering plants. There are seven New Zealand members of the Coriaria genus. This genus is sparingly found in four main distribution areas in the world, and occurs in the Mediterranean Basin, East Asia, Papua New Guinea, New Zealand, and some parts in the Americas. Good (1930) identified three groups within Coriaria, A, B, and C, based on geographic distribution and other morphological characteristics.

The phylogenetic relationships of twelve Coriaria species were studied by Yokoyama et al. (2000) using combined rbcL and matK gene data. The study retained Good's group C, but they instead renamed it to group 2. This group contains C. sarmentosa.

=== Etymology ===
The etymology (word origin) of C. sarmentosa's genus name, Coriaria, derives from the Latin corium meaning 'hide', possibly originating from the use of this genus in leather tanning. The specific epithet (second part of the scientific name), sarmentosa, comes from the Latin sarmentosus, meaning 'full of twigs'. The species is commonly known as tutu, grassland tutu, or ground tutu. The Māori language name 'tutu' has cognates found in other Eastern Polynesian languages such as Tahitian and Cook Islands Māori which use the word to describe the unrelated Colubrina asiatica, a plant that has visual similarity to Coriaria. The word 'tutu' has been used colloquially as a verb.

== Distribution ==
New Zealand has the highest concentration of Coriaria species. C. sarmentosa is found in the North, South, and Stewart Islands. In the North Island, the species is present on Wellington's coast. C. sarmentosa 's 2023 conservation status in the New Zealand Threat Classification System was "Not Threatened".

=== Habitat ===
Coriaria sarmentosa's habitat ranges from sea level to mountainous environments. It can be found on debris slopes and along streams. Daly (1967) notes that the species is found grasslands and shrublands.

== Ecology ==
Coriaria sarmentosa's seeds are dispersed by fruit-eating animals (frugivores). German-born New Zealand explorer Julius von Haast recorded that the kākāpō (Strigops habroptilus), a large flightless parrot, fed on C. sarmentosa's fruits and favoured them. The pollination strategy of Coriaria is uncertain. Burrows (1995) claimed the flowers are pollinated by birds and insects. Thomphson & Gornal (1995) claimed that Coriaria is wind-pollinated.

== Works cited ==
Books

- Allan, H.H (1961). Flora of New Zealand. Vol. 1. P D Hasselberg Government Printer Publications. ISBN 9780477010566.
- Eagle, Audrey (2006). Eagle's Complete Trees and Shrubs of New Zealand. Vol. 1. Wellington, New Zealand: Te Papa Press. ISBN 0-909010-08-0.
- Vennell, Robert (2019). The Meaning of Trees. Auckland, New Zealand: HarperCollins. ISBN 978-1-77554-130-1.

Journals

- Burrows, C. J. (1995). "Germination behaviour of the seeds of four New Zealand species of Coriaria (Coriariaceae)". New Zealand Journal of Botany. 33 (2): 265–275. doi:10.1080/0028825X.1995.10410489. ISSN 0028-825X.
- Daly, T.G. (1967). "Non-leguminous nitrogen-fixers in New Zealand". Canterbury Chamber of Commerce Agricultural Bulletin (449).
- Good, R. D'O. (1930). "The Geography of the Genus Coriaria". The New Phytologist. 29 (3). New Phytologist Trust: 170–198. ISSN 0028-646X. JSTOR 2428353.
- Lindsay, W Lauder (1868). "On the Properties and Products of the Toot Plant of New Zealand". The British and Foreign Medico-Chirurgical Review. 42 (84). PMID 30163132.
- Thompson, Peter N.; Gornall, Richard J. (1995). "Breeding systems in Coriaria (Coriariaceae)". Botanical Journal of the Linnean Society. 117 (4): 293–304. doi:10.1111/j.1095-8339.1995.tb02592.x.
- Yokoyama, Jun; Suzuki, Mitsuo; Iwatsuki, Kunio; Hasebe, Mitsuyasu (2000). "Molecular Phylogeny of Coriaria, with Special Emphasis on the Disjunct Distribution". Molecular Phylogenetics and Evolution. 14 (1). Elsevier BV: 11–19. doi:10.1006/mpev.1999.0672. ISSN 1055-7903.

Websites

- De Lange, Peter (2026). "Coriaria sarmentosa". New Zealand Plant Conservation Network. Archived from the original on 10 December 2025.
- "Coriaria sarmentosa G.Forst". Plants of the World Online. Archived from the original on 13 February 2025 – via Royal Botanic Gardens, Kew.
