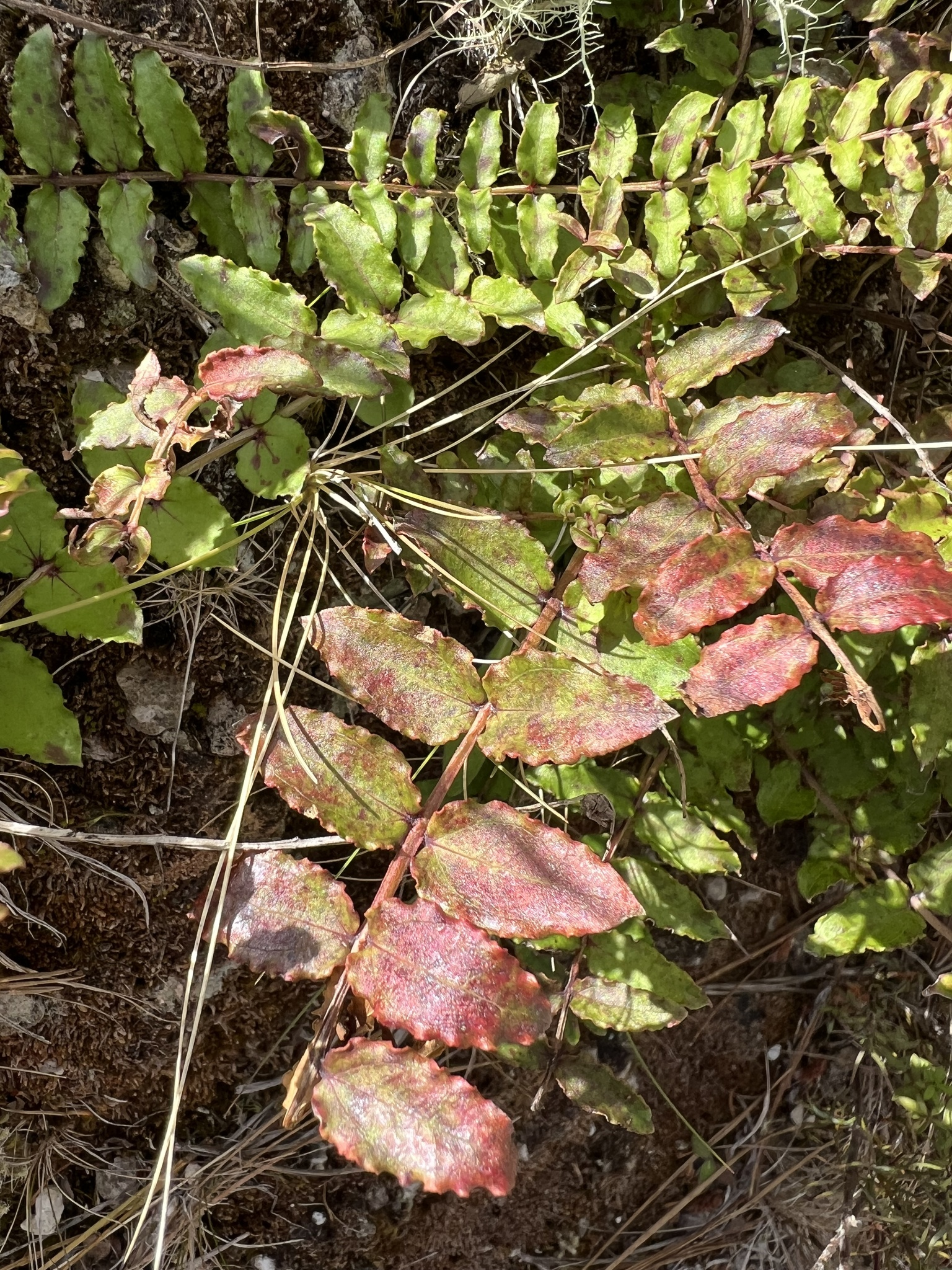
- Foliage of Coriaria kingiana

Conservation status
- Not Threatened (NZ TCS)

Scientific classification
- Kingdom: Plantae
- Clade: Embryophytes
- Clade: Tracheophytes
- Clade: Spermatophytes
- Clade: Angiosperms
- Clade: Eudicots
- Clade: Rosids
- Order: Cucurbitales
- Family: Coriariaceae
- Genus: Coriaria
- Species: C. kingiana

Binomial name
- Coriaria kingiana Colenso

Synonyms
- Coriaria thymifolia var. undulata Petrie; Coriaria lurida var. undulata (Petrie) Allan

= Coriaria kingiana =

Species of flowering plant

Coriaria kingiana, commonly known as tutu and small-leaved tutu, is a species of shrub in the family Coriariaceae. It is endemic to New Zealand. This species is common in grasslands and shrublands. It was first described by the British botanist William Colenso in 1844. C. kingiana was originally believed to be only found in the North Island, but has since been reported in the South Island. This species, and all Coriaria species, are poisonous, especially the seeds. C. kingiana's 2023 assessment in the New Zealand Threat Classification System was "Not Threatened".

== Description ==
Coriaria kingiana is a bushy shrub in the family Coriariaceae. It usually reaches a height of 1 metre (3 feet 3 inches), and consists of many erect or spreading branches, and it reaches a diameter of 4 m (13 ft) long. It has dark-green pointed wavy leaves, which are 12–15 mm long and 5–10 mm wide. Leaves can be red to purplish on new growth. Leaves are broader toward the base, with a distinct pair of lateral veins. The petioles are about 1 mm long. The flowers are arranged in a spike that is about 5–7 cm (2.0–2.8 in) in length. Fruit is black in colour. This species, and all Coriaria species, are poisonous, especially the seeds. C. kingiana has a diploid chromosome count of 70.

== Taxonomy ==
Coriaria kingiana was first described by the British botanist William Colenso in 1844. There are two recognised synonyms of the species: Coriaria thymifolia var. undulata described in 1921 by Donald Petrie and Coriaria thymifolia var. undulata described in 1931 by Harry Allan. Coriaria has one of the most disjunct distribution areas in the world, which makes it one of the most unusual genera among flowering plants. There are seven New Zealand members of the Coriaria genus. This genus is sparingly found in four main distribution areas in the world, and occurs in the Mediterranean Basin, East Asia, Papua New Guinea, New Zealand, and some parts in the Americas. Good (1930) identified three groups within Coriaria, A, B, and C, based on geographic distribution and other morphological characteristics.

=== Etymology ===
The etymology (word origin) of C. kingiana's genus name, Coriaria, derives from the Latin corium meaning 'hide', possibly originating from the use of this genus in leather tanning. The specific epithet (second part of the scientific name), kingiana, is named in honour of the naval officer Phillip Parker King. The species is commonly known as tutu, small-leaved tutu, or tutu-papa. The Māori language name 'tutu' has cognates found in other Eastern Polynesian languages such as Tahitian and Cook Islands Māori which use the word to describe the unrelated Colubrina asiatica, a plant that has visual similarity to Coriaria. The word 'tutu' has been used colloquially as a verb.

== Distribution ==
New Zealand has the highest concentration of Coriaria species. C. kingiana is found in the North and South Islands. It was originally believed that the species was found only in the central North Island, but Eagle (2006) notes this species is also found in the Marlborough Region in the South Island, "especially in the Clarence catchment". C. kingiana's 2023 conservation status in the New Zealand Threat Classification System was "Not Threatened".

=== Habitat ===
Coriaria arborea is typically found in lowland to montane environments. It is common in grasslands and shrublands. Daly (1967) noted that C. kingiana is often found on infertile soils and is commonly associated with bracken fern (Pteridium esculentum).

== Ecology ==
Coriaria kingiana's seeds are dispersed by fruit-eating animals (frugivores). The pollination strategy of Coriaria is uncertain. Burrows (1995) claimed the flowers are pollinated by birds and insects. Thomphson & Gornal (1995) claimed that Coriaria is wind-pollinated.

== Works cited ==
Books

- Allan, H.H (1961). Flora of New Zealand. Vol. 1. P D Hasselberg Government Printer Publications. ISBN 9780477010566.
- Eagle, Audrey (2006). Eagle's Complete Trees and Shrubs of New Zealand. Vol. 1. Wellington, New Zealand: Te Papa Press. ISBN 0-909010-08-0.
- Vennell, Robert (2019). The Meaning of Trees. Auckland, New Zealand: HarperCollins. ISBN 978-1-77554-130-1.

Journals

- Burrows, C. J. (1995). "Germination behaviour of the seeds of four New Zealand species of Coriaria (Coriariaceae)". New Zealand Journal of Botany. 33 (2): 265–275. doi:10.1080/0028825X.1995.10410489. ISSN 0028-825X.
- Daly, T.G. (1967). "Non-leguminous nitrogen-fixers in New Zealand". Canterbury Chamber of Commerce Agricultural Bulletin (449).
- Good, R. D'O. (1930). "The Geography of the Genus Coriaria". The New Phytologist. 29 (3). New Phytologist Trust: 170–198. ISSN 0028-646X. JSTOR 2428353.
- Thompson, Peter N.; Gornall, Richard J. (1995). "Breeding systems in Coriaria (Coriariaceae)". Botanical Journal of the Linnean Society. 117 (4): 293–304. doi:10.1111/j.1095-8339.1995.tb02592.x.
- Yokoyama, Jun; Suzuki, Mitsuo; Iwatsuki, Kunio; Hasebe, Mitsuyasu (2000). "Molecular Phylogeny of Coriaria, with Special Emphasis on the Disjunct Distribution". Molecular Phylogenetics and Evolution. 14 (1). Elsevier BV: 11–19. doi:10.1006/mpev.1999.0672. ISSN 1055-7903.

Websites

- De Lange, Peter (2026). "Coriaria kingiana". New Zealand Plant Conservation Network. Archived from the original on 16 November 2025.
- "Coriaria kingiana Colenso". Plants of the World Online. Archived from the original on 12 February 2025 – via Royal Botanic Gardens, Kew.
