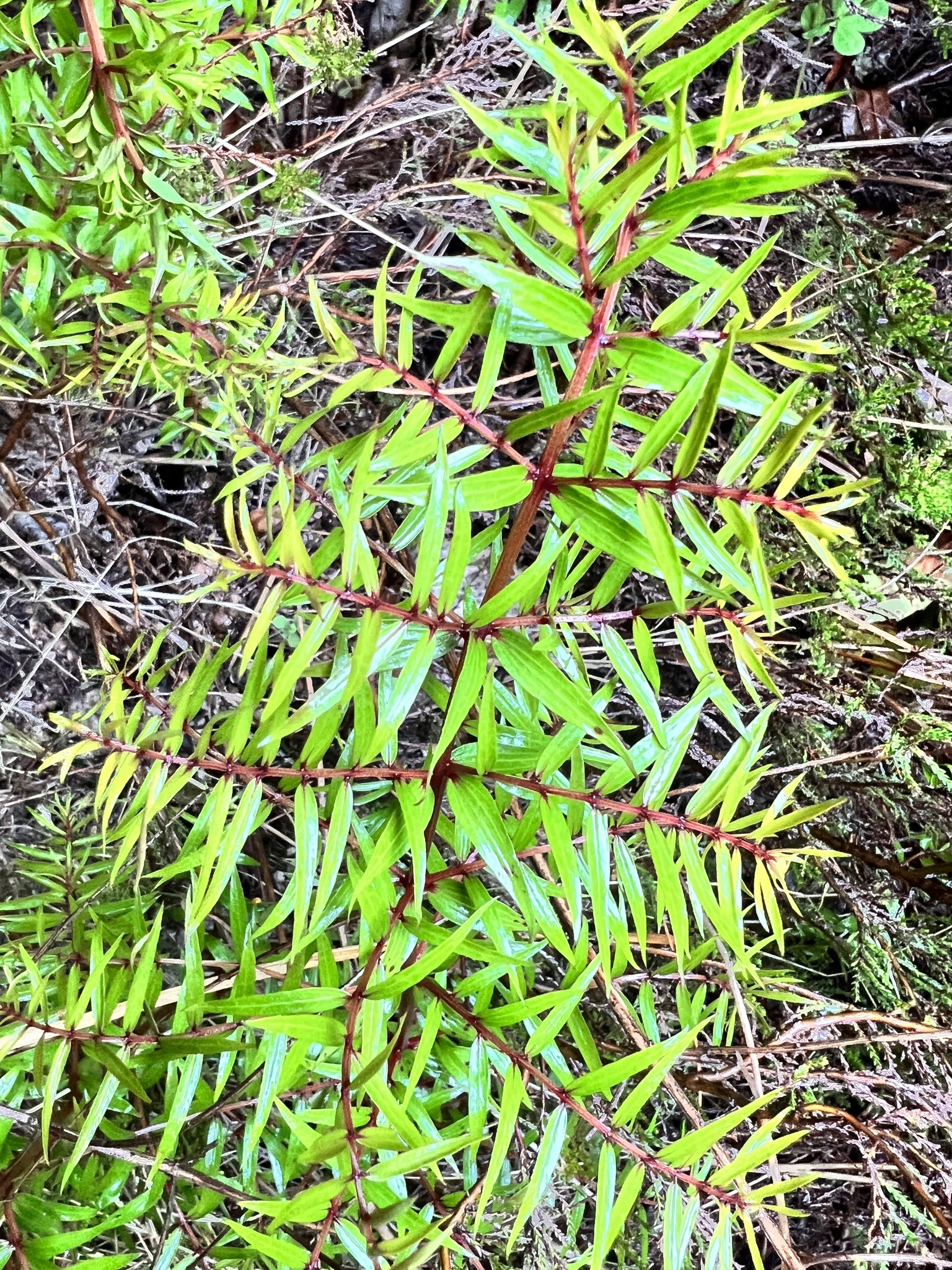
- Foliage of Coriaria pteridoides

Conservation status
- Not Threatened (NZ TCS)

Scientific classification
- Kingdom: Plantae
- Clade: Tracheophytes
- Clade: Angiosperms
- Clade: Eudicots
- Clade: Rosids
- Order: Cucurbitales
- Family: Coriariaceae
- Genus: Coriaria
- Species: C. pteridoides

Binomial name
- Coriaria pteridoides W.R.B.Oliv.

Synonyms
- Coriaria lurida var. acuminata Cockayne & Allan

= Coriaria pteridoides =

Species of flowering plant

Coriaria pteridoides, commonly known as tutu and small-leaved tutu, is a species of shrub in the family Coriariaceae. It is endemic to New Zealand's North Island. This species is common along streams and gravel slopes. It was first described by the New Zealand botanist Walter Oliver in 1942. C. pteridoides's range only covers Mount Taranaki, the North Island Volcanic Plateau, and the Ruahine Ranges. This species, and all Coriaria species, are poisonous, especially the seeds. C. pteridoides's 2023 assessment in the New Zealand Threat Classification System was "Not Threatened".

== Description ==
Coriaria pteridoides is a bushy shrub in the family Coriariaceae. It usually reaches a height of 1 metre (3 feet 3 inches), and consists of many erect branches. It has long, dark-green, narrow, and pointed leaves, which are 5–25 mm long by 2–4 mm wide. The pedicels are up to 5 mm long. Fruit is reddish-black in colour. This species, and all Coriaria species, are poisonous, especially the seeds. C. pteridoides has a diploid chromosome count of 80.

== Taxonomy ==
Coriaria pteridoides was first described by the New Zealand botanist Walter Oliver in 1942. There is one recognised heterotypic synonym of the species: Coriaria lurida var. acuminata described in 1926 by Leonard Cockayne and Harry Allan. Coriaria has one of the most disjunct distribution areas in the world, which makes it one of the most unusual genera among flowering plants. There are seven New Zealand members of the Coriaria genus. This genus is sparingly found in four main distribution areas in the world, and occurs in the Mediterranean Basin, East Asia, Papua New Guinea, New Zealand, and some parts in the Americas. Good (1930) identified three groups within Coriaria, A, B, and C, based on geographic distribution and other morphological characteristics.

=== Etymology ===
The etymology (word origin) of C. pteridoides's genus name, Coriaria, derives from the Latin corium meaning 'hide', possibly originating from the use of this genus in leather tanning. The specific epithet (second part of the scientific name), pteridoides, means 'fern-like', it comes from the Greek pteris, meaning fern, and -oides meaning resembling. The species is commonly known as tutu or small-leaved tutu. The Māori language name 'tutu' has cognates found in other Eastern Polynesian languages such as Tahitian and Cook Islands Māori which use the word to describe the unrelated Colubrina asiatica, a plant that has visual similarity to Coriaria. The word 'tutu' has been used colloquially as a verb.

== Distribution ==
New Zealand has the highest concentration of Coriaria species. C. pteridoides is endemic to New Zealand's North Island. It is only found on the slopes of Mount Taranaki, the North Island Volcanic Plateau, and the Ruahine Ranges. C. pteridoides's 2023 conservation status in the New Zealand Threat Classification System was "Not Threatened".

=== Habitat ===
Coriaria pteridoides is found in mountainous environments. It can be found on gravel slopes and along streams. Daly (1967) notes that the species is found in rugged, native grasslands and shrublands, and is commonly found on pumiceous soils.

== Ecology ==
Coriaria pteridoides's seeds are dispersed by fruit-eating animals (frugivores). The pollination strategy of Coriaria is uncertain. Burrows (1995) claimed the flowers are pollinated by birds and insects. Thomphson & Gornal (1995) claimed that Coriaria is wind-pollinated.

== Works cited ==
Books

- Allan, H.H (1961). Flora of New Zealand. Vol. 1. P D Hasselberg Government Printer Publications. ISBN 9780477010566.
- Eagle, Audrey (2006). Eagle's Complete Trees and Shrubs of New Zealand. Vol. 1. Wellington, New Zealand: Te Papa Press. ISBN 0-909010-08-0.
- Vennell, Robert (2019). The Meaning of Trees. Auckland, New Zealand: HarperCollins. ISBN 978-1-77554-130-1.

Journals

- Burrows, C. J. (1995). "Germination behaviour of the seeds of four New Zealand species of Coriaria (Coriariaceae)". New Zealand Journal of Botany. 33 (2): 265–275. doi:10.1080/0028825X.1995.10410489. ISSN 0028-825X.
- Daly, T.G. (1967). "Non-leguminous nitrogen-fixers in New Zealand". Canterbury Chamber of Commerce Agricultural Bulletin (449).
- Good, R. D'O. (1930). "The Geography of the Genus Coriaria". The New Phytologist. 29 (3). New Phytologist Trust: 170–198. ISSN 0028-646X. JSTOR 2428353.
- Thompson, Peter N.; Gornall, Richard J. (1995). "Breeding systems in Coriaria (Coriariaceae)". Botanical Journal of the Linnean Society. 117 (4): 293–304. doi:10.1111/j.1095-8339.1995.tb02592.x.
- Yokoyama, Jun; Suzuki, Mitsuo; Iwatsuki, Kunio; Hasebe, Mitsuyasu (2000). "Molecular Phylogeny of Coriaria, with Special Emphasis on the Disjunct Distribution". Molecular Phylogenetics and Evolution. 14 (1). Elsevier BV: 11–19. doi:10.1006/mpev.1999.0672. ISSN 1055-7903.

Websites

- De Lange, Peter (2026). "Coriaria pteridoides". New Zealand Plant Conservation Network. Archived from the original on 5 October 2025.
- "Coriaria pteridoides W.R.B.Oliv". Plants of the World Online. Archived from the original on 13 February 2025 – via Royal Botanic Gardens, Kew.
