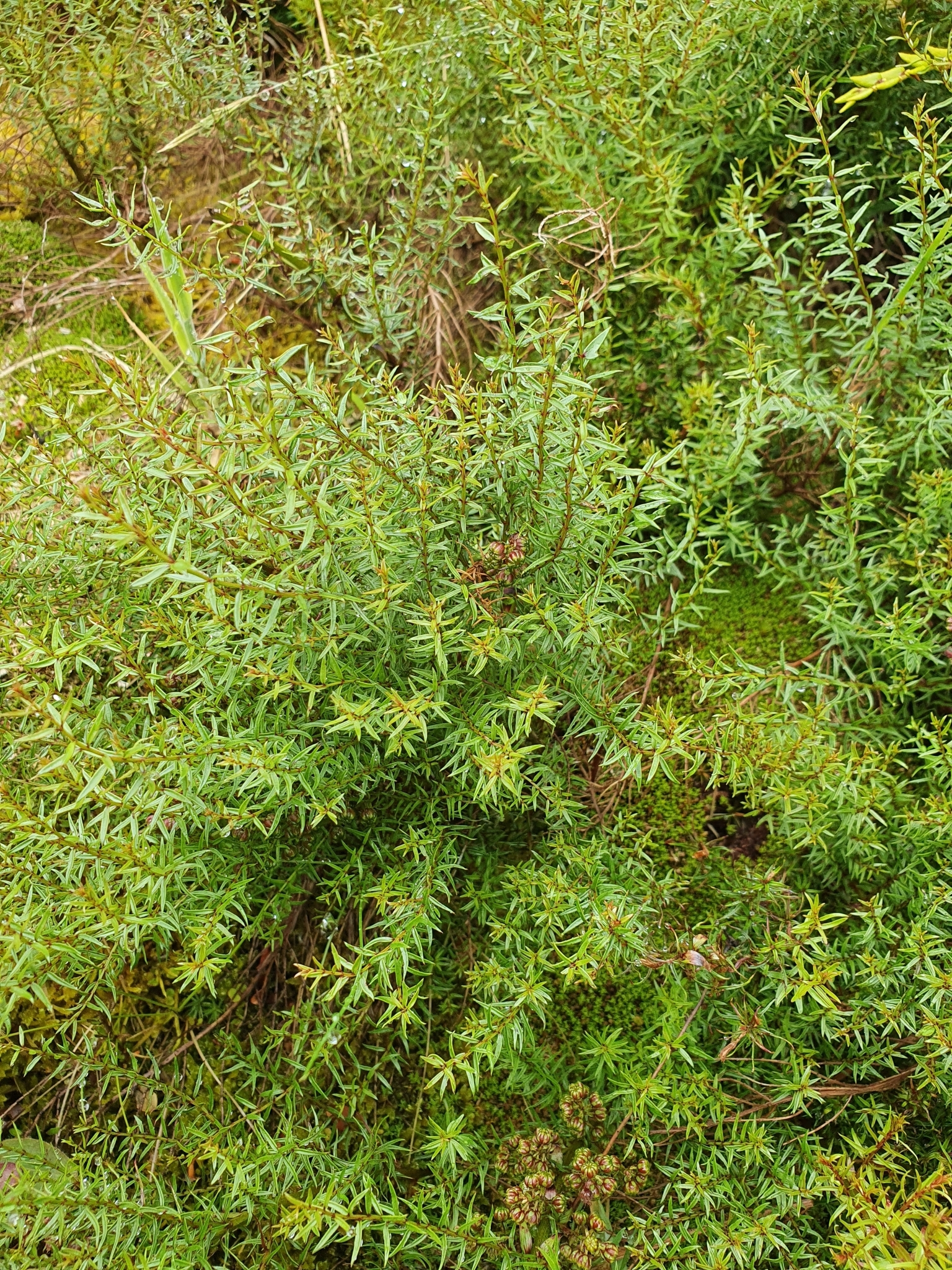
- Foliage of Coriaria angustissima

Conservation status
- Not Threatened (NZ TCS)

Scientific classification
- Kingdom: Plantae
- Clade: Tracheophytes
- Clade: Angiosperms
- Clade: Eudicots
- Clade: Rosids
- Order: Cucurbitales
- Family: Coriariaceae
- Genus: Coriaria
- Species: C. angustissima

Binomial name
- Coriaria angustissima Hook.f

= Coriaria angustissima =

Species of flowering plant

Coriaria angustissima, commonly known as tutu and small-leaved tutu, is a species of shrub in the family Coriariaceae. It is endemic to New Zealand's South and Stewart Islands. This species is found in rocky or gravelly areas and along streams. It was first described by the British botanist Joseph Dalton Hooker in 1864. This species, and all Coriaria species, are poisonous, especially the seeds. C. angustissima's 2023 assessment in the New Zealand Threat Classification System was "Not Threatened".

== Description ==
Coriaria angustissima is a bushy shrub in the family Coriariaceae. It has dark-green, narrow, and pointed leaves, which are 7–10 mm long by 1–2 mm wide. Fruits are reddish-black in colour and they are arranged in spikes. This species, and all Coriaria species, are poisonous, especially the seeds.

== Taxonomy ==
Coriaria angustissima was first described by the British botanist Joseph Dalton Hooker in 1864. Coriaria has one of the most disjunct distribution areas in the world, which makes it one of the most unusual genera among flowering plants. There are seven New Zealand members of the Coriaria genus. This genus is sparingly found in four main distribution areas in the world, and occurs in the Mediterranean Basin, East Asia, Papua New Guinea, New Zealand, and some parts in the Americas. Good (1930) identified three groups within Coriaria, A, B, and C, based on geographic distribution and other morphological characteristics.

=== Etymology ===
The etymology (word origin) of C. angustissima's genus name, Coriaria, derives from the Latin corium meaning 'hide', possibly originating from the use of this genus in leather tanning. The specific epithet (second part of the scientific name), angustissima, means 'verry narrow', it comes from the Latin angustus, meaning 'narrow'. The species is commonly known as tutu and small-leaved tutu. The Māori language name 'tutu' has cognates found in other Eastern Polynesian languages such as Tahitian and Cook Islands Māori which use the word to describe the unrelated Colubrina asiatica, a plant that has visual similarity to Coriaria. The word 'tutu' has been used colloquially as a verb.

== Distribution ==
New Zealand has the highest concentration of Coriaria species. C. angustissima is endemic to New Zealand's South and Stewart Islands. C. angustissima's 2023 conservation status in the New Zealand Threat Classification System was "Not Threatened".

=== Habitat ===
Coriaria angustissima is found in mountainous and subalpine environments, and is present in rocky or gravelly areas and along streams.

== Ecology ==
Coriaria angustissima's seeds are dispersed by fruit-eating animals (frugivores). The pollination strategy of Coriaria is uncertain. Burrows (1995) claimed the flowers are pollinated by birds and insects. Thomphson & Gornal (1995) claimed that Coriaria is wind-pollinated.

== Works cited ==
Books

- Allan, H.H (1961). Flora of New Zealand. Vol. 1. P D Hasselberg Government Printer Publications. ISBN 9780477010566.
- Vennell, Robert (2019). The Meaning of Trees. Auckland, New Zealand: HarperCollins. ISBN 978-1-77554-130-1.

Journals

- Burrows, C. J. (1995). "Germination behaviour of the seeds of four New Zealand species of Coriaria (Coriariaceae)". New Zealand Journal of Botany. 33 (2): 265–275. doi:10.1080/0028825X.1995.10410489. ISSN 0028-825X.
- Daly, T.G. (1967). "Non-leguminous nitrogen-fixers in New Zealand". Canterbury Chamber of Commerce Agricultural Bulletin (449).
- Good, R. D'O. (1930). "The Geography of the Genus Coriaria". The New Phytologist. 29 (3). New Phytologist Trust: 170–198. ISSN 0028-646X. JSTOR 2428353.
- Thompson, Peter N.; Gornall, Richard J. (1995). "Breeding systems in Coriaria (Coriariaceae)". Botanical Journal of the Linnean Society. 117 (4): 293–304. doi:10.1111/j.1095-8339.1995.tb02592.x.
- Yokoyama, Jun; Suzuki, Mitsuo; Iwatsuki, Kunio; Hasebe, Mitsuyasu (2000). "Molecular Phylogeny of Coriaria, with Special Emphasis on the Disjunct Distribution". Molecular Phylogenetics and Evolution. 14 (1). Elsevier BV: 11–19. doi:10.1006/mpev.1999.0672. ISSN 1055-7903.

Websites

- De Lange, Peter (2026). "Coriaria angustissima". New Zealand Plant Conservation Network. Archived from the original on 24 January 2026.
- "Coriaria angustissima Hook.f." Plants of the World Online. Archived from the original on 13 February 2025 – via Royal Botanic Gardens, Kew.
