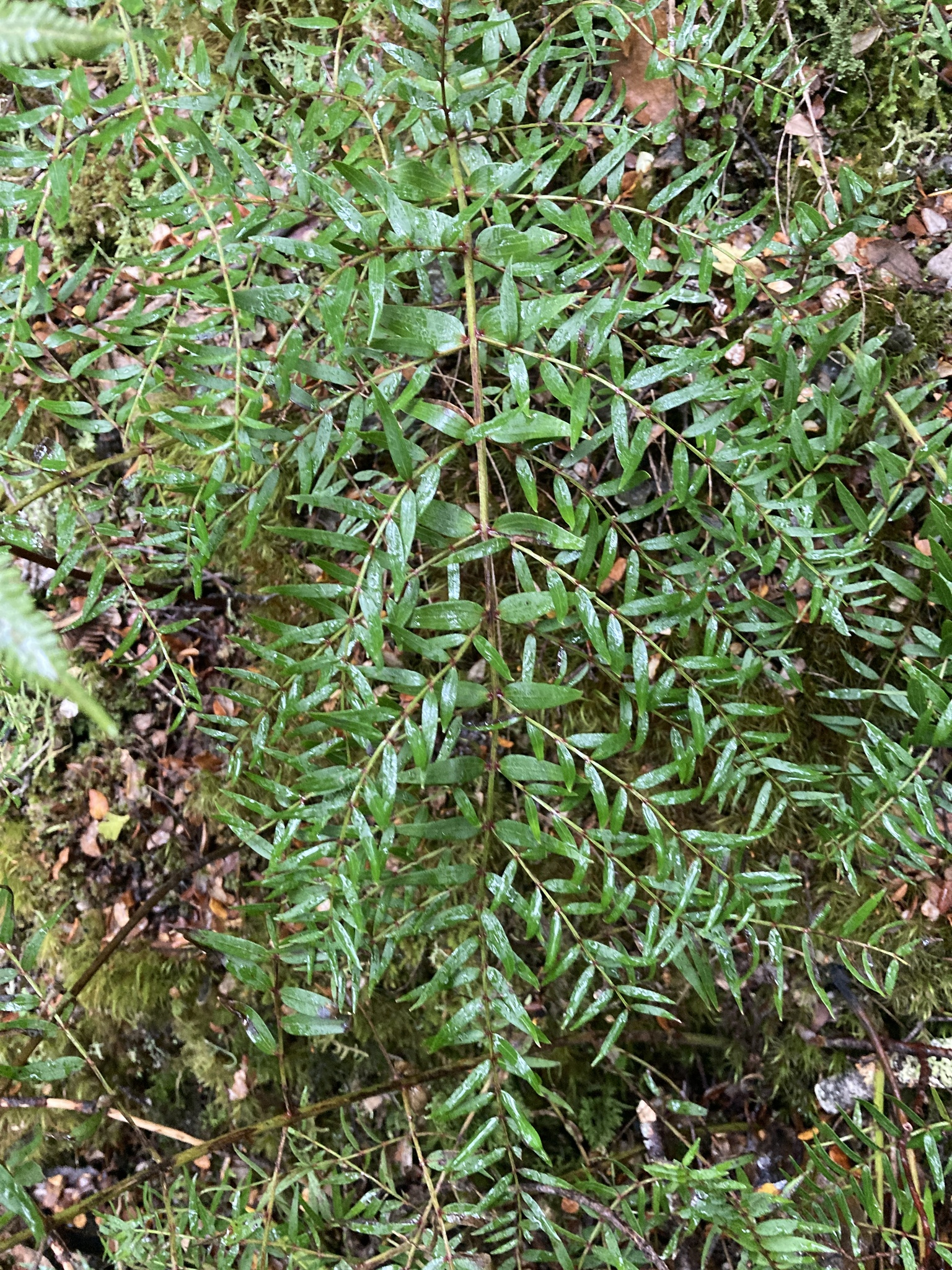
- Foliage of Coriaria plumosa

Conservation status
- Not Threatened (NZ TCS)

Scientific classification
- Kingdom: Plantae
- Clade: Tracheophytes
- Clade: Angiosperms
- Clade: Eudicots
- Clade: Rosids
- Order: Cucurbitales
- Family: Coriariaceae
- Genus: Coriaria
- Species: C. plumosa

Binomial name
- Coriaria plumosa W.R.B.Oliv.

Synonyms
- Coriaria lurida var. parviflora Cockayne & Allan

= Coriaria plumosa =

Species of flowering plant

Coriaria plumosa, commonly known as feathery tutu, mountain tutu, and small-leaved tutu, is a species of shrub in the family Coriariaceae. It is endemic to New Zealand. Its range covers the North, South, and Stewart Islands. It is found in mountainous areas. It was first described by the New Zealand botanist Walter Oliver in 1942. This species, and all Coriaria species, are poisonous, especially the seeds. C. plumosa's 2023 assessment in the New Zealand Threat Classification System was "Not Threatened".

== Description ==
Coriaria plumosa is a bushy shrub in the family Coriariaceae. It usually reaches a height of 40 centimetres (16 inches) and consists of many erect branches. It has long, dark-green, narrow, and pointed leaves, which are 6–8 mm long by 1.5–3 mm wide. The pedicels are 1 mm long. Fruit is black in colour. This species, and all Coriaria species, are poisonous, especially the seeds.

== Taxonomy ==
Coriaria plumosa was first described by the New Zealand botanist Walter Oliver in 1942. There is one recognised heterotypic synonym of the species: Coriaria lurida var. parviflora described in 1926 by Leonard Cockayne and Harry Allan. Coriaria has one of the most disjunct distribution areas in the world, which makes it one of the most unusual genera among flowering plants. There are seven New Zealand members of the Coriaria genus. This genus is sparingly found in four main distribution areas in the world, and occurs in the Mediterranean Basin, East Asia, Papua New Guinea, New Zealand, and some parts in the Americas. Good (1930) identified three groups within Coriaria, A, B, and C, based on geographic distribution and other morphological characteristics.

=== Etymology ===
The etymology (word origin) of C. plumosa's genus name, Coriaria, derives from the Latin corium meaning 'hide', possibly originating from the use of this genus in leather tanning. The specific epithet (second part of the scientific name), plumosa, means 'feathered', it comes from the Latin pluma, meaning 'feathers'. The species is commonly known as feathery tutu, mountain tutu, and small-leaved tutu. The Māori language name 'tutu' has cognates found in other Eastern Polynesian languages such as Tahitian and Cook Islands Māori which use the word to describe the unrelated Colubrina asiatica, a plant that has visual similarity to Coriaria. The word 'tutu' has been used colloquially as a verb.

== Distribution ==
New Zealand has the highest concentration of Coriaria species. C. plumosa is endemic to New Zealand. Its range covers the North, South, and Stewart Islands. It only occurs south of Mount Taranaki and the Raukūmara Range. C. plumosa's 2023 conservation status in the New Zealand Threat Classification System was "Not Threatened".

=== Habitat ===
Coriaria plumosa is found in mountainous and subalpine environments. It can be found on gravel slopes and along streams.

== Ecology ==
Coriaria plumosa's seeds are dispersed by fruit-eating animals (frugivores). The pollination strategy of Coriaria is uncertain. Burrows (1995) claimed the flowers are pollinated by birds and insects. Thomphson & Gornal (1995) claimed that Coriaria is wind-pollinated.

== Works cited ==
Books

- Allan, H.H (1961). Flora of New Zealand. Vol. 1. P D Hasselberg Government Printer Publications. ISBN 9780477010566.
- Eagle, Audrey (2006). Eagle's Complete Trees and Shrubs of New Zealand. Vol. 1. Wellington, New Zealand: Te Papa Press. ISBN 0-909010-08-0.
- Vennell, Robert (2019). The Meaning of Trees. Auckland, New Zealand: HarperCollins. ISBN 978-1-77554-130-1.

Journals

- Burrows, C. J. (1995). "Germination behaviour of the seeds of four New Zealand species of Coriaria (Coriariaceae)". New Zealand Journal of Botany. 33 (2): 265–275. doi:10.1080/0028825X.1995.10410489. ISSN 0028-825X.
- Good, R. D'O. (1930). "The Geography of the Genus Coriaria". The New Phytologist. 29 (3). New Phytologist Trust: 170–198. ISSN 0028-646X. JSTOR 2428353.
- Thompson, Peter N.; Gornall, Richard J. (1995). "Breeding systems in Coriaria (Coriariaceae)". Botanical Journal of the Linnean Society. 117 (4): 293–304. doi:10.1111/j.1095-8339.1995.tb02592.x.
- Yokoyama, Jun; Suzuki, Mitsuo; Iwatsuki, Kunio; Hasebe, Mitsuyasu (2000). "Molecular Phylogeny of Coriaria, with Special Emphasis on the Disjunct Distribution". Molecular Phylogenetics and Evolution. 14 (1). Elsevier BV: 11–19. doi:10.1006/mpev.1999.0672. ISSN 1055-7903.

Websites

- De Lange, Peter (2026). "Coriaria plumosa". New Zealand Plant Conservation Network. Archived from the original on 29 November 2025.
- "Coriaria plumosa W.R.B.Oliv". Plants of the World Online. Archived from the original on 12 February 2025 – via Royal Botanic Gardens, Kew.
