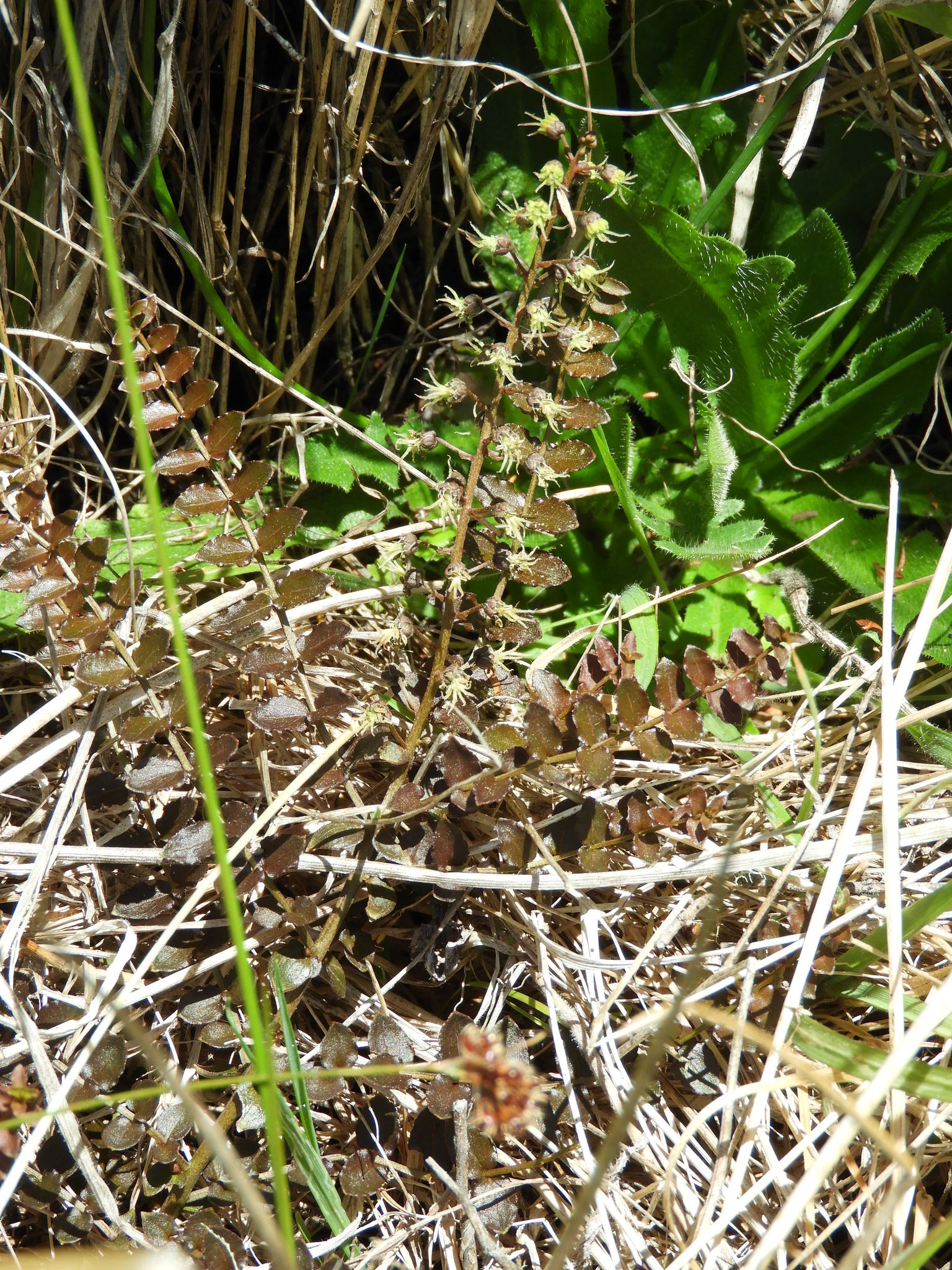
- Foliage of Coriaria pottsiana

Conservation status
- Nationally Critical (NZ TCS)

Scientific classification
- Kingdom: Plantae
- Clade: Embryophytes
- Clade: Tracheophytes
- Clade: Spermatophytes
- Clade: Angiosperms
- Clade: Eudicots
- Clade: Rosids
- Order: Cucurbitales
- Family: Coriariaceae
- Genus: Coriaria
- Species: C. pottsiana

Binomial name
- Coriaria pottsiana W.R.B.Oliv.

= Coriaria pottsiana =

Species of flowering plant

Coriaria pottsiana is a species of shrub in the family Coriariaceae. It is endemic to New Zealand's North Island. This species is found on shingle slips. It was first described by the New Zealand botanist Walter Oliver in 1942. C. pottsiana's range only covers Mount Hikurangi and Mount Parikanapa in the Raukūmara Range. This species, and all Coriaria species, are poisonous, especially the seeds. C. pottsiana's 2023 assessment in the New Zealand Threat Classification System was "Threatened – Nationally Critical".

== Description ==
Coriaria pottsiana is a bushy shrub in the family Coriariaceae. Leaves are bronze, and 6–8 mm long by 5–6 mm wide. They are rounded and wavy in character. Flowers are found in spikes, which can be 4–14 cm (1.6–5.5 in) long. Fruit is black in colour. This species, and all Coriaria species, are poisonous, especially the seeds. C. pottsiana has a diploid chromosome count of 60.

== Taxonomy ==
Coriaria pottsiana was first described by the New Zealand botanist Walter Oliver in 1942. Coriaria has one of the most disjunct distribution areas in the world, which makes it one of the most unusual genera among flowering plants. There are seven New Zealand members of the Coriaria genus. This genus is sparingly found in four main distribution areas in the world, and occurs in the Mediterranean Basin, East Asia, Papua New Guinea, New Zealand, and some parts in the Americas. Good (1930) identified three groups within Coriaria, A, B, and C, based on geographic distribution and other morphological characteristics.

=== Etymology ===
The etymology (word origin) of C. pottsiana's genus name, Coriaria, derives from the Latin corium meaning 'hide', possibly originating from the use of this genus in leather tanning. The specific epithet (second part of the scientific name), pottsiana, is named after the botanist Nelson Potts.

== Distribution ==
New Zealand has the highest concentration of Coriaria species. C. pottsiana is endemic to New Zealand's North Island. C. pottsiana's range only covers Mount Hikurangi and Mount Parikanapa in the Raukūmara Range. C. pottsiana's 2023 conservation status in the New Zealand Threat Classification System was "Threatened – Nationally Critical".

=== Habitat ===
C. pottsiana is found on shingle slips, from about 1,200–1,400 m (3,900–4,600 ft) above sea level.

== Ecology ==
Coriaria pottsiana's seeds are dispersed by fruit-eating animals (frugivores). The pollination strategy of Coriaria is uncertain. Burrows (1995) claimed the flowers are pollinated by birds and insects. Thomphson & Gornal (1995) claimed that Coriaria is wind-pollinated.

== Works cited ==
Books

- Allan, H.H (1961). Flora of New Zealand. Vol. 1. P D Hasselberg Government Printer Publications. ISBN 9780477010566.
- Eagle, Audrey (2006). Eagle's Complete Trees and Shrubs of New Zealand. Vol. 1. Wellington, New Zealand: Te Papa Press. ISBN 0-909010-08-0.
- Vennell, Robert (2019). The Meaning of Trees. Auckland, New Zealand: HarperCollins. ISBN 978-1-77554-130-1.

Journals

- Burrows, C. J. (1995). "Germination behaviour of the seeds of four New Zealand species of Coriaria (Coriariaceae)". New Zealand Journal of Botany. 33 (2): 265–275. doi:10.1080/0028825X.1995.10410489. ISSN 0028-825X.
- Good, R. D'O. (1930). "The Geography of the Genus Coriaria". The New Phytologist. 29 (3). New Phytologist Trust: 170–198. ISSN 0028-646X. JSTOR 2428353.
- Heginbotham, M. (1974). "The Hukutaia Domain, Opotiki Museum of the New Zealand Flora". Wellington Botanical Society. 38: 34–37.
- Thompson, Peter N.; Gornall, Richard J. (1995). "Breeding systems in Coriaria (Coriariaceae)". Botanical Journal of the Linnean Society. 117 (4): 293–304. doi:10.1111/j.1095-8339.1995.tb02592.x.
- Yokoyama, Jun; Suzuki, Mitsuo; Iwatsuki, Kunio; Hasebe, Mitsuyasu (2000). "Molecular Phylogeny of Coriaria, with Special Emphasis on the Disjunct Distribution". Molecular Phylogenetics and Evolution. 14 (1). Elsevier BV: 11–19. doi:10.1006/mpev.1999.0672. ISSN 1055-7903.

Websites

- De Lange, Peter (2026). "Coriaria pottsiana". New Zealand Plant Conservation Network. Archived from the original on 24 November 2025.
- "Coriaria pottsiana W.R.B.Oliv". Plants of the World Online. Archived from the original on 12 February 2025 – via Royal Botanic Gardens, Kew.
