= C. asiatica =

C. asiatica may refer to:

- Centella asiatica, a small herbaceous annual plant species native to Asia
- Colubrina asiatica, the latherleaf, Asian nakedwood or Asian snakewood, a shrub species native to Africa, India, Southeast Asia, tropical Australia and the Pacific Islands

== See also ==
- List of Latin and Greek words commonly used in systematic names#Asiatica
