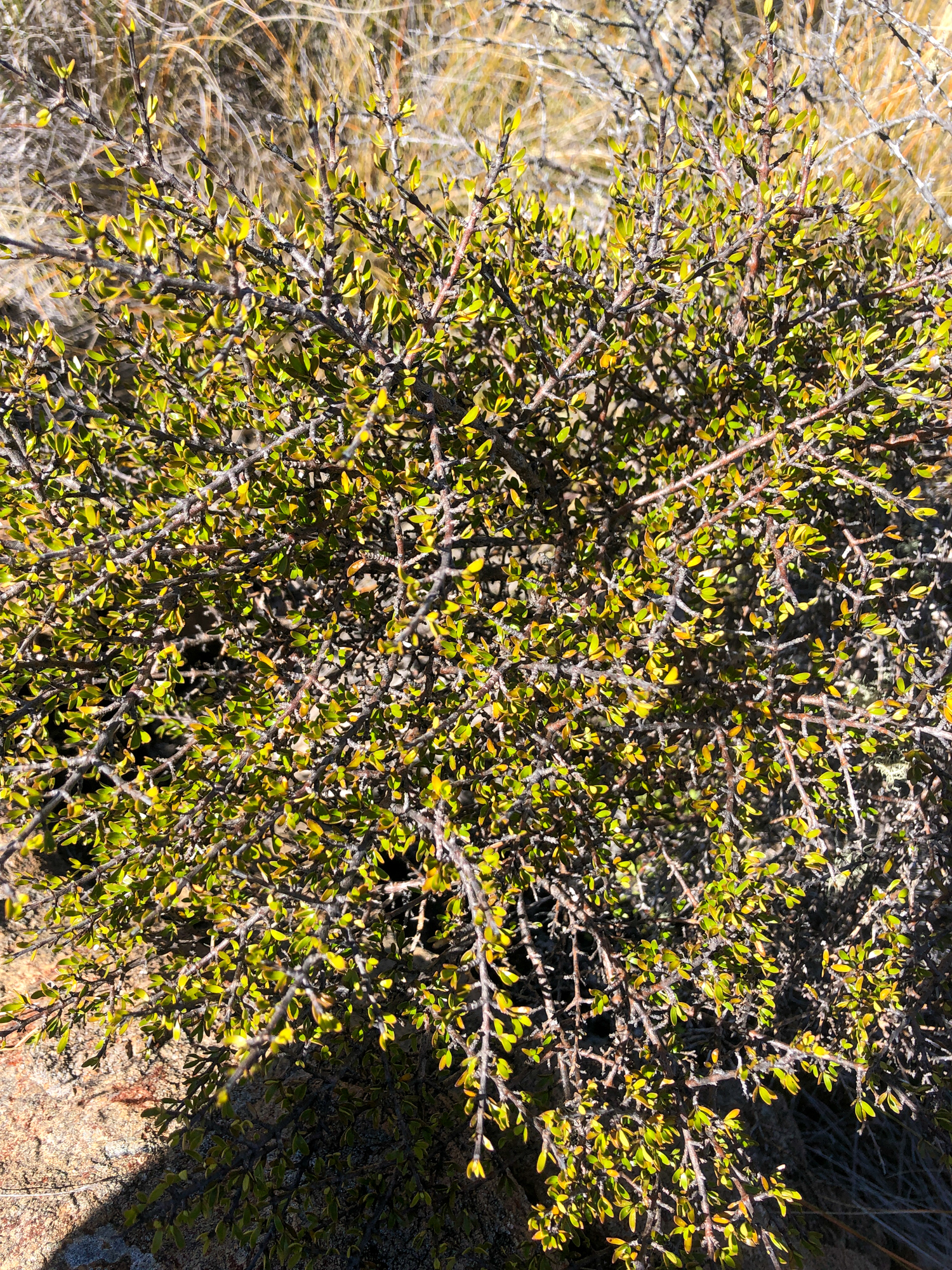
- A Coprosma cheesemanii from Nelson Lakes National Park

Conservation status
- Not Threatened (NZ TCS)

Scientific classification
- Kingdom: Plantae
- Clade: Tracheophytes
- Clade: Angiosperms
- Clade: Eudicots
- Clade: Asterids
- Order: Gentianales
- Family: Rubiaceae
- Genus: Coprosma
- Species: C. cheesemanii

Binomial name
- Coprosma cheesemanii W.R.B.Oliv., 1934

= Coprosma cheesemanii =

Species of flowering plant

Coprosma cheesemanii is a species of Coprosma from New Zealand. It is a low shrub with green flowers and small leaves.

== Description ==
The description the New Zealand Plant Conservation Network provides is:

Low growing, very small leaved shrub with branches bearing perpendicular short leafy branches giving a flattened appearance inhabiting upland areas. Twigs fuzzy. Leaves glossy, narrow, 8-11mm long, tip pointed, in clusters of pairs, with a line of small hairs between the leaf bases. Fruit orange or reddish.

== Range ==
North and South Islands, from Mt. Hikurangi south.

== Habitat ==
Montane to subalpine, but not limited entirely to hillsides, as it can also be found in wet flat areas like bogs or swamps.

== Etymology ==
This plant was named after Thomas Cheeseman.
