= Coriamyrtin =

Convulsant toxin

Names
- IUPAC name (1S,2R,3S,5R,6R,7R,9S,12R)-2-Hydroxy-7-methyl-12-prop-1-en-2-ylspiro[4,10-dioxatetracyclo[7.2.1.02,7.03,5]dodecane-6,2'-oxirane]-11-one
- Other names Coriamyrtine

Identifiers
3D model (JSmol)	Interactive image
PubChem CID	442189
CompTox Dashboard (EPA)	DTXSID50948589
- InChI: InChI=1S/C15H18O5/c1-6(2)8-7-4-13(3)14(5-18-14)10-11(20-10)15(13,17)9(8)12(16)19-7/h7-11,17H,1,4-5H2,2-3H3/t7-,8+,9+,10+,11-,13-,14+,15-/m0/s1 Key: BWWDLKVKPVKBGJ-TWMZOSGRSA-N
- SMILES: CC(=C)C1C2CC3(C4(CO4)C5C(C3(C1C(=O)O2)O)O5)C

Properties
Chemical formula	C_{15}H_{18}O_{5}
Molar mass	278.304 g·mol^{−1}
- Except where otherwise noted, data are given for materials in their standard state (at 25 °C [77 °F], 100 kPa). Infobox references

Coriamyrtin is a toxic γ-lactone naturally present in a multitude of plants.

== Natural occurrence ==
Coriamyrtin can be found in Scurrula parasitica, Coriaria microphylla, Coriaria nepalensis, and certain other plants.

== Toxicity ==
Coriamyrtin is a convulsant. It appears to act via antagonism of GABA_{A} receptors. Poisoning is usually from ingestion of parts of the plants containing it. A case of poisoning was able to be treated with repeated administration of diazepam, an anticonvulsant.
