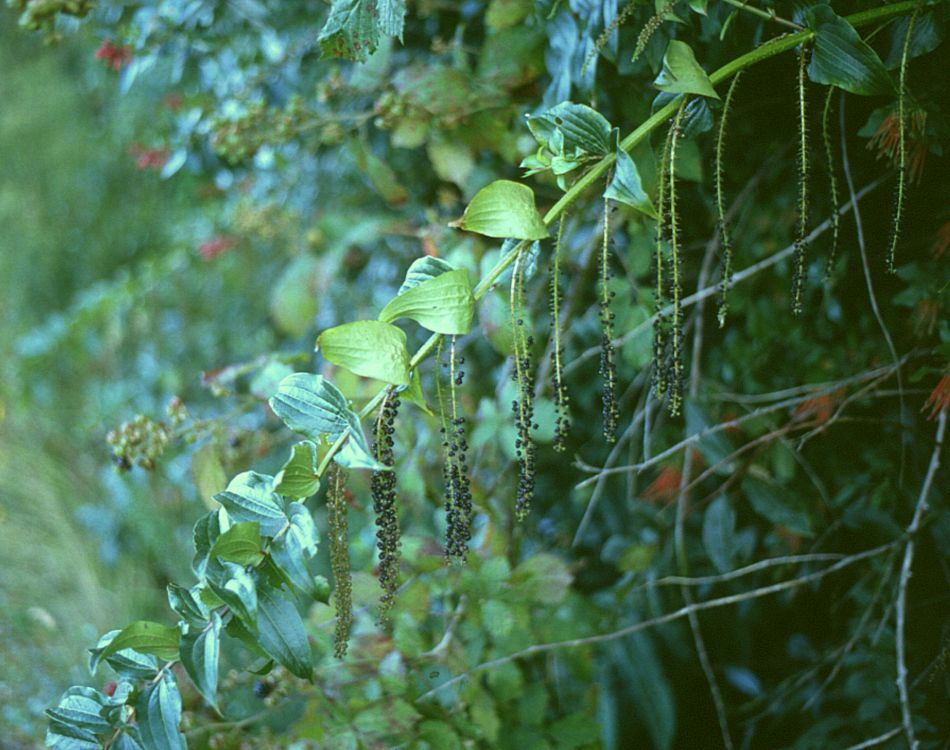
- Coriaria ruscifolia

Scientific classification
- Kingdom: Plantae
- Clade: Tracheophytes
- Clade: Angiosperms
- Clade: Eudicots
- Clade: Rosids
- Order: Cucurbitales
- Family: Coriariaceae; Mirb.
- Genus: Coriaria; L. 1753

Type species
- Coriaria myrtifolia L.

Species
- 14; see text.
- Coriaria distribution

Synonyms
- Heterocladus Turcz.; Heterophylleia Turcz.

= Coriaria =

Genus of flowering plants

Coriaria is the sole genus in the family Coriariaceae, which was described by Linnaeus in 1753. It includes 14 species of small trees, shrubs and subshrubs, with a widespread but disjunct distribution across warm temperate regions of the world, occurring as far apart as the Mediterranean region, southern and eastern Asia, New Zealand (where some are alpine species), the Pacific Ocean islands, and Central and South America.

The leaves are opposite or in whorls, simple, 2–9 centimetres (0.79–3.54 inches) long, without stipules. The flowers are borne in racemes 2–30 cm long, each flower small, greenish, with five small petals. The fruit is a small and shiny black (occasionally yellow or red) berry-like swollen corolla, highly poisonous in several species, though those of C. terminalis are edible. At least a few members of this genus are non-legume nitrogen fixers.

The Mediterranean species C. myrtifolia is known as redoul, and the several New Zealand species are known by the Māori name of tutu.

The South American species C. ruscifolia is an evergreen climber known as deu or huique, and is used in southern Chile to make rat poison.

== Species ==
Coriaria comprises the following species:

- Coriaria angustissima Hook.f. - New Zealand (South I + Stewart I)
- Coriaria arborea Linds. - New Zealand (South I, North I, Chatham Is, Kermadec Is)
- Coriaria duthiei D.K.Singh & Pusalkar - W Himalayas (N Pakistan + Kashmir, N India)
- Coriaria japonica A.Gray - Japan, Taiwan
  - subsp. intermedia (Matsum.) T.C.Huang
  - subsp. japonica A.Gray
- Coriaria kingiana Colenso - New Zealand (North I)
- Coriaria kweichovensis Hu - S China, Himalayas
- Coriaria lurida Kirk - New Zealand (South I, North I)
- Coriaria myrtifolia L. - Spain, France, Italy, Algeria, Morocco, Greece, Tunisia
- Coriaria nepalensis Wall. - Himalayas
- Coriaria plumosa W.R.B.Oliv. - New Zealand (South I, North I)
- Coriaria pottsiana W.R.B.Oliv. - New Zealand (North I)
- Coriaria pteridoides W.R.B.Oliv. - New Zealand (North I)
- Coriaria ruscifolia L. - Latin America from C Mexico to S Argentina + S Chile; New Guinea.
  - subsp. microphylla (Poir.) J.E.Skog
  - subsp. ruscifolia L.
- Coriaria sarmentosa G.Forst. - New Zealand
- Coriaria terminalis Hemsl. - Sichuan, Tibet, Nepal, Sikkim, Bhutan

== Hybrids ==
The following hybrids have been described:

- Coriaria × sarlurida Cockayne & Allan - New Zealand
- Coriaria × sarmangusta Allan - New Zealand

== Fossil record ==
Coriariaceae fossils as pollen and seeds, are known from the Miocene of Europe. The discovery of pollen grains from Early Campanian (ca. 82 Mya) deposits in Antarctica, which were described as Coriaripites goodii, expand the family’s fossil record and represent the so far oldest fossil of the order Cucurbitales.
