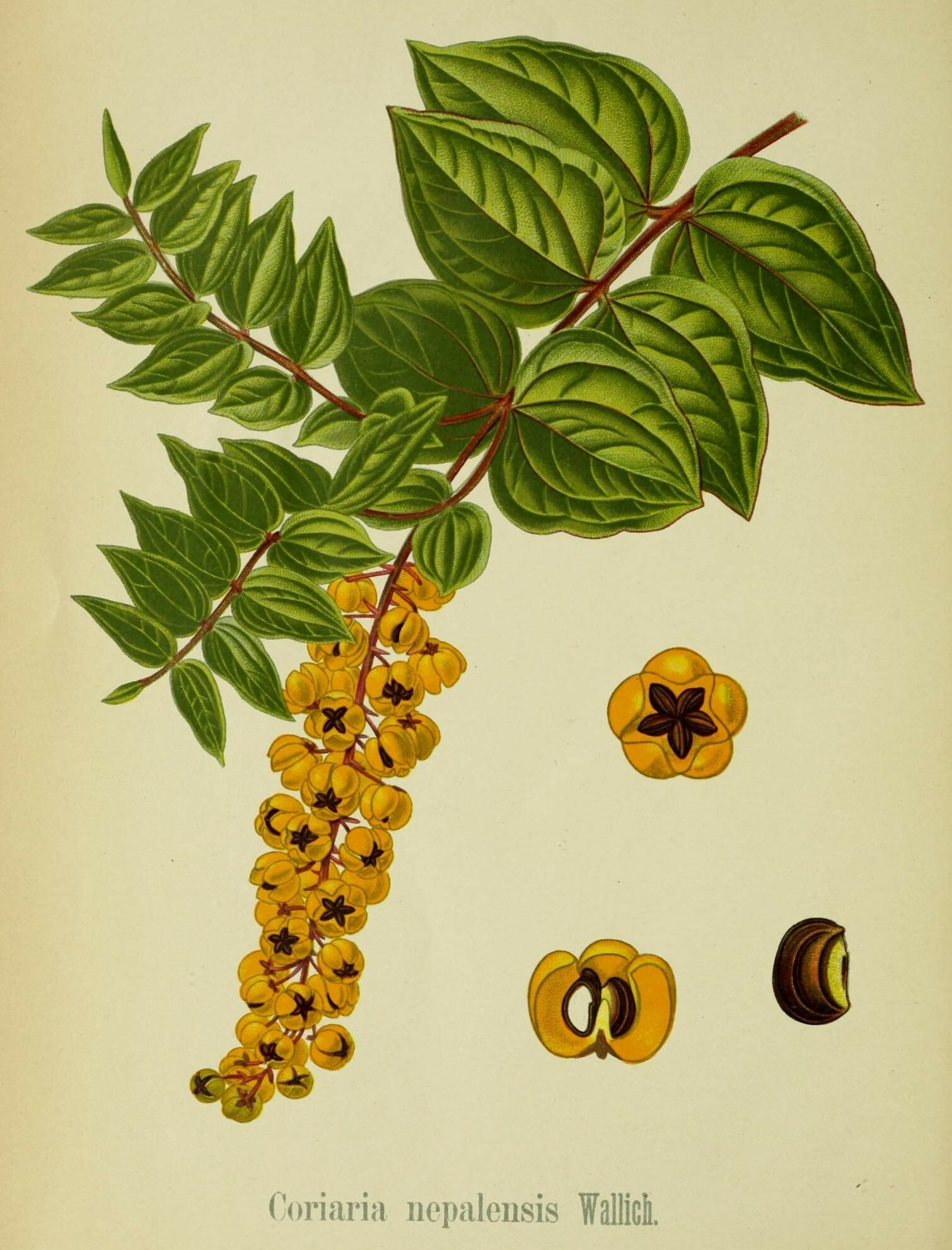

Scientific classification
- Kingdom: Plantae
- Clade: Tracheophytes
- Clade: Angiosperms
- Clade: Eudicots
- Clade: Rosids
- Order: Cucurbitales
- Family: Coriariaceae
- Genus: Coriaria
- Species: C. nepalensis

Binomial name
- Coriaria nepalensis Wall.

Synonyms
- Coriaria sinica Maxim.; Morus calva H. Léveillé

= Coriaria nepalensis =

Species of shrub

Coriaria nepalensis is a shrub of the genus Coriaria. It grows in the foothills of the Himalayas. It blooms in spring and has bright yellow flowers and red fruits in summer.

The plant is also known in English as masuri berry, tanner's tree, or mansur shrub. In Hindi it is known as masuri (मसूरी), makola, or masurya (मसूरिया); and in Nepali as macchaino (मछाईनो).

== Description ==
C. nepalensis is a shrub, growing around 1.5-2.5 metres tall. Flowers, yellow in colour, are in groups (inflorescences) and they are male or female but in the same plant. It blooms from February to May.

Fruits are red to dark purple when mature. They resemble berries, but they are actually achenes protected by enlarged and colored petals. The fruits are produced from May to August, but they are inedible as their seeds are poisonous.

The number of chromosomes the plant has is 40.

C. nepalensis is toxic due to the presence of coriamyrtin.

== Distribution ==
C. nepalensis grows on the southern slopes of the Himalayas (in Bhutan, India, Nepal, Pakistan), usually between 800 and 2500 metres.

This species was also found in southern China in mountain slopes at 200–3200 m high. It has been found in the Chinese provinces of Gansu, Guangxi, Guizhou, Henan, Hong Kong, Hubei, Hunan, Jiangsu, Shaanxi, Sichuan, Xizang, and Yunnan.
