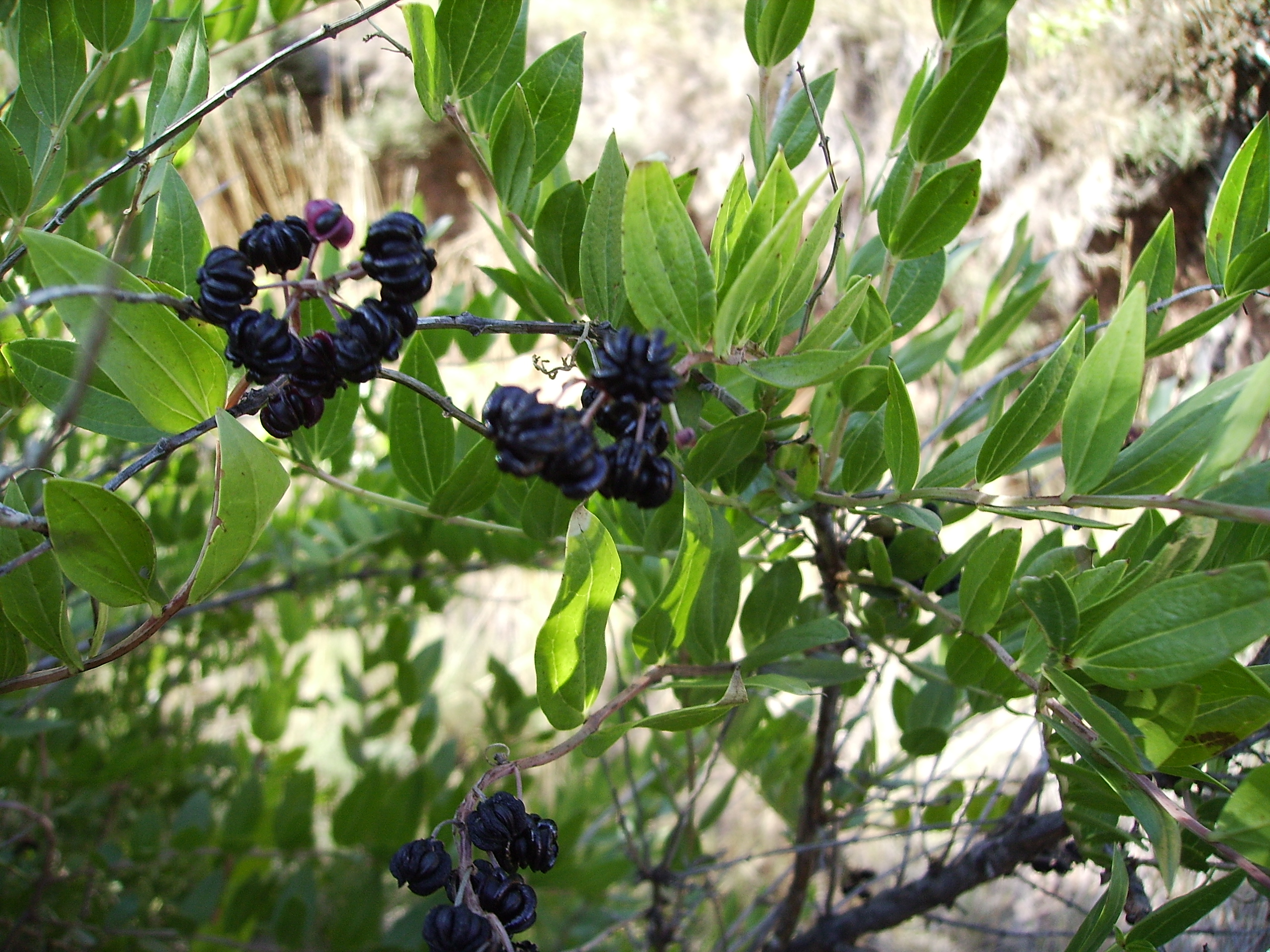
- Leaves and mature fruits in July

Scientific classification
- Kingdom: Plantae
- Clade: Tracheophytes
- Clade: Angiosperms
- Clade: Eudicots
- Clade: Rosids
- Order: Cucurbitales
- Family: Coriariaceae
- Genus: Coriaria
- Species: C. myrtifolia

Binomial name
- Coriaria myrtifolia L.

Synonyms
- Coriaria hermaphrodita Turra; Coriaria tinctoria Dulac

= Coriaria myrtifolia =

Species of plant

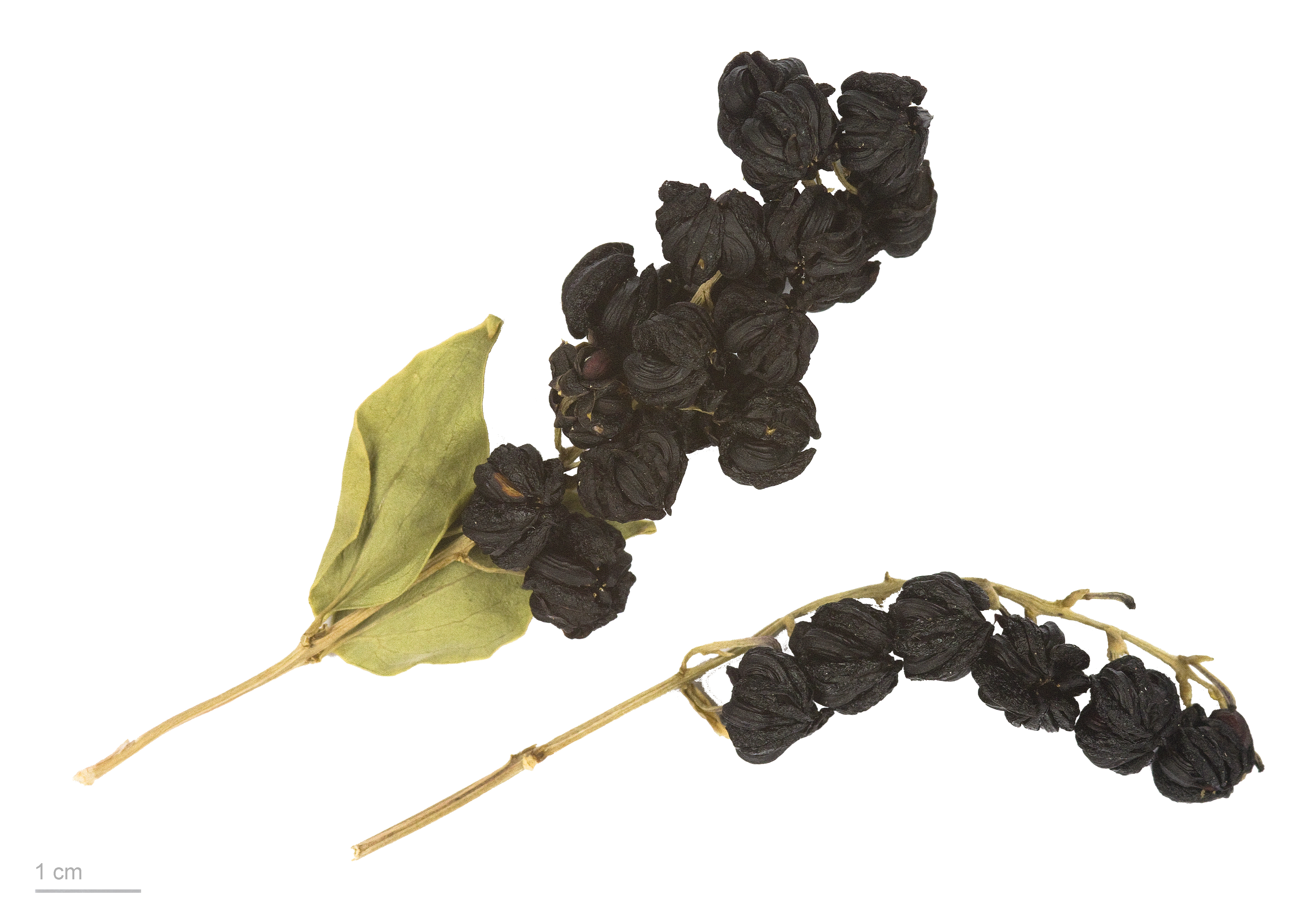
Coriaria myrtifolia – MHNT

Coriaria myrtifolia, called in English redoul, is a shrub that grows to 2–3 metres tall. Myrtifolia means myrtle-like leaves.

The fruit is a fleshy black berry achene slightly similar to a blackberry but toxic. Coriaria myrtifolia has the largest fruits in the genus Coriaria. It is especially dangerous for children, who may eat it if they confuse it with edible berries. It should be recognized as one of the most neurotoxic plants in the western Mediterranean area.

== Range ==
Geographically, this species is confined to northern Mediterranean coastal Spain and Southern France (from the Gironde to the Alpes Maritimes), penetrating into Italy as far as part of the Apennines. The species reappears in the western Rif and Algeria, and in the Balearic Islands it appears only in Ibiza. The oldest known mention of this plant, dating from 932, is in a place name and implies its presence in the County of Manresa, north-west of Barcelona.

In all this range, this plant plays an important role in preventing soil erosion and serves as understory vegetation. It is extraordinarily abundant in the less dense woodlands of the Spanish provinces of Girona and Barcelona (eastern part) at altitudes of 200–600 m, reaching occasionally to 1,000 m.

== Name ==
The Spanish name emborrachacabras (i.e. makes goats drunk) refers to the leaves' intoxicating effect on goats that eat them. The French name is Corroyère à feuilles de myrte. The Occitan name (rodor) and Catalan name (roldor) derive from Latin Rhus tyrius (Rhus coriaria), referring to the leaves' use in the traditional tannery industry. In Morocco, it's called arwaz (أرواز) in Berber as well as the spoken Moroccan Arabic.

== Description ==
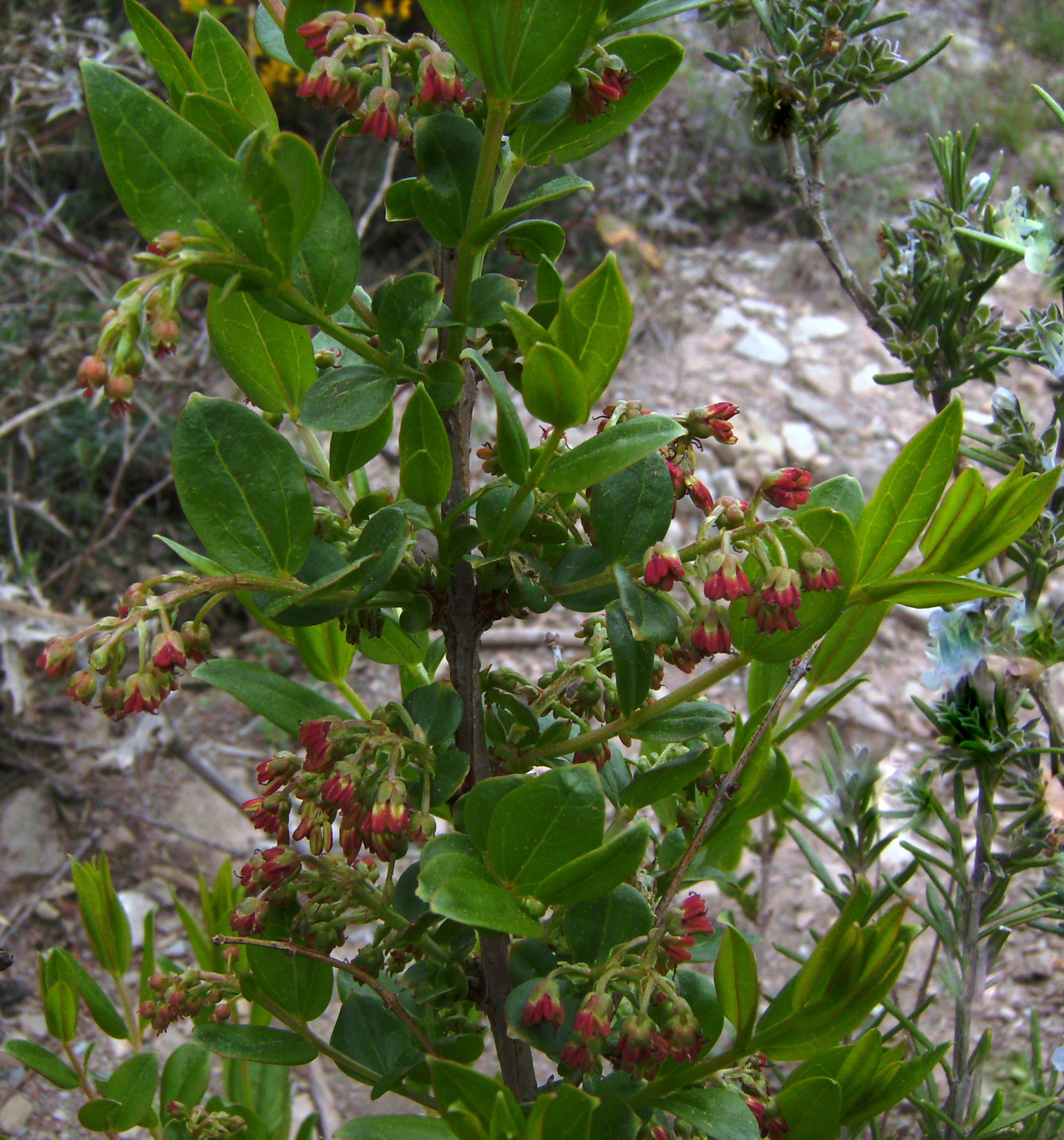
A flowering plant (Castelltallat)

The root nodules of this plant carry out symbiotic nitrogen fixation, Coriaria myrtifolia is one of the 13 Coriaria species known to bear actinorhizae.

The redoul is a shrub with branches greyish square section. The leaves are sessile, mostly opposite but sometimes in groups of three or more, oblong, acuminate, with three ribs. The small greenish flowers, which appear from April to June in racemes, have five reddish highlights styles, five sepals and five petals, with ten stamens. The black fruits are formed of five fleshy carpels, each containing one seed.

== Toxicity ==
The leaves and fruits of Coriaria myrtifolia contain coriamyrtin, a typical convulsant substance one member of picrotoxane sesquiterpenes, was first isolated in 1864.

Toxic effects are characterized by digestive (nausea, vomiting, abdominal pain), neurological (obnubilation, convulsions and their complications), and respiratory disorders (polypnea, respiratory problems, apnea, short and superficial respiration) together with myositis of the pupils. Treatment of this poisoning is purely symptomatic. In the case of convulsions, rapid resuscitation in an intensive care unit is necessary. Coriamyrtin also has a pharmacological action.

The honeydew from redoul is also toxic.

== Uses ==
Traditionally, leaves of redoul were intensively collected for their tannin content, for tanning and dyeing purposes. During the medieval period, ecclesiastical institutions and the aristocracy clearly sought to establish some royalties on this resource, the samples are being especially on the distribution and sale of material first. These uses are due to the wealth of Coriaria spp tannin, particularly concentrated in the root and the bark of the stem, but also present in leaves, where they coexist with yellow dyes from the chemical group of flavonoids. These tannins are part of the group of hydrolyzable tannins, such as gall tannins. The chemical composition of redoul thus makes a tanning substance, capable of transforming recently flayed animal skins into leather, which is rot resistant, flexible and relatively impermeable, known as Basil leather. These properties allow for its widespread use in many industries. Moreover, the well-known chemical reaction of tannins with iron salts, producing black precipitates, is the basis for the manufacture of some inks used since the Middle Ages, and is also used to dye a variety of textiles black or gray. Until the mid-fourteenth century, the material was the subject of extensive trade between the north of Catalonia and Languedoc. The Māori used species of Coriaria from New Zealand: they produced traditional tattoo inks from the fruit juice, made musical instruments from the hollow stems, and despite its extreme toxicity ate the fruit sparingly due to its sweet taste; using it to sweeten drinking water or jellies made from seaweed.

Coriaria myrtifolia is also used as an ornamental plant.
