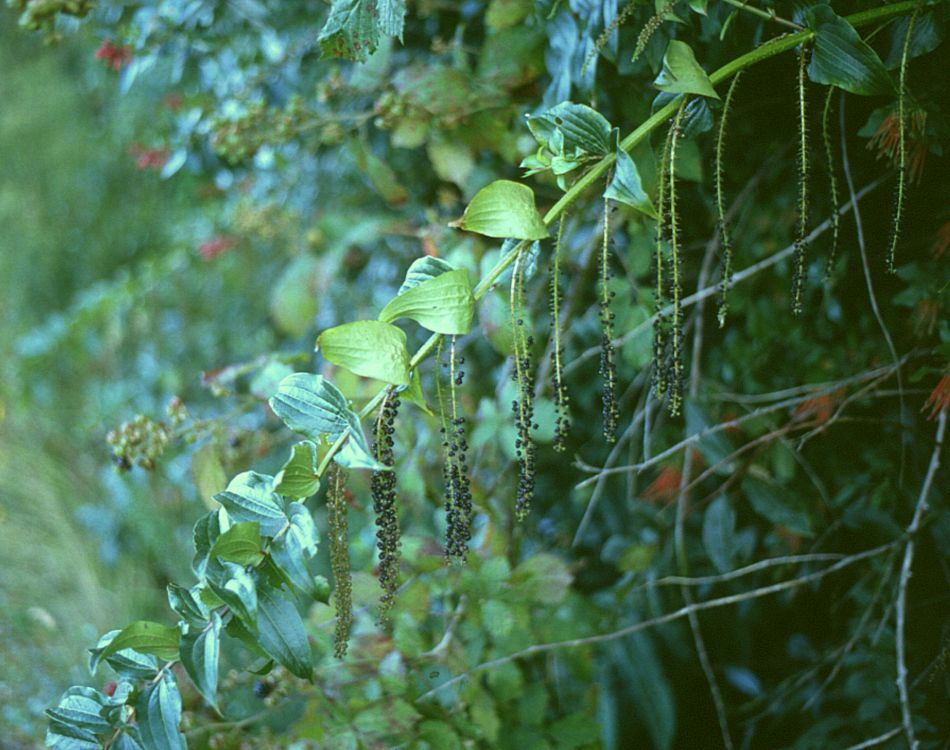

Scientific classification
- Kingdom: Plantae
- Clade: Tracheophytes
- Clade: Angiosperms
- Clade: Eudicots
- Clade: Rosids
- Order: Cucurbitales
- Family: Coriariaceae
- Genus: Coriaria
- Species: C. ruscifolia

Binomial name
- Coriaria ruscifolia L.

Subspecies
- subsp. microphylla (Poir.) J.E.Skog; subsp. ruscifolia L.

Synonyms
- Coriaria atropurpurea Moc. & Sessé ex DC.; Coriaria microphylla Poir.; Coriaria papuana Warb.; Coriaria phylicifolia Humb. & Bonpl. ex Willd.; Coriaria thymifolia Humb. & Bonpl. ex Willd.

= Coriaria ruscifolia =

Species of plant

Coriaria ruscifolia is a plant of the Coriariaceae family.

It is native to Mexico, Central America, and South America.

== Description ==
Coriaria ruscifolia is a deciduous shrub. It is poisonous except for the "fruit", which are actually petals.

== Uses ==
In Ecuador, its fruits are reportedly eaten to produce an inebriated state. The eater is said to experience “sensations of soaring through the air”. The effects are said to be similar to those produced by Petunia violacea. Coriaria ruscifolia grows in Mexico as well; it has been suggested that it was the Aztec inebriant known as tlacopétatl. In the Las Huaringas region, a lake plateau in the northern Peruvian Andes, the local healers (curanderos) refer to Coriaria ruscifolia as contra-alergica, “against allergies.” They use the herbage to prepare a bath additive that they use to wash patients suffering from allergic reactions.

== Toxicity ==
The fruits contain catechol derivatives and probably several sesquiterpenes. Sources state that a toxic substance coriamyrtine has been isolated from the plant. The effects are described as initially stimulating but then becoming less pleasant. Death from nervous exhaustion can result. Coriamyrtine is a sesquiterpene; other sesquiterpenes including coriatine, tutine, and pseudotutine have also been reported. Known in Chile as deu, dewü, huique, huiqui, and matarratones, it is reputed to be a toxic hallucinogen. The fruits are made into rat poison in Chile and are said to be lethal for small children. The Mapuche use a tea made from the leaves as an emetic.

Chemical structure of the toxic sesquiterpene coriamyrtin
