= New Phytologist =

Peer-reviewed scientific journal

- Discipline: Plant Science
- Language: English
- Edited by: Maarja Öpik

Publication details
- Former name: The Phytologist
- History: 1902–present
- Publisher: Wiley-Blackwell
- Frequency: 24/year
- Open access: Hybrid
- Impact factor: 8.7 (2025)

Standard abbreviations
- ISO 4: New Phytol.

Indexing
- CODEN: NEPHAV
- ISSN: 0028-646X (print); 1469-8137 (web)
- LCCN: 07000035
- JSTOR: 0028646x
- OCLC no.: 1759937

Links
- Journal homepage; Current issue

New Phytologist is a peer-reviewed scientific journal published on behalf of the New Phytologist Foundation by Wiley-Blackwell. It covers all aspects of botany and was established in 1902 by Arthur Tansley, who served as editor until 1931.

Maarja Öpik took up the position of Editor-in-Chief of New Phytologist in January 2025. The previous Editor-in-Chief was Alistair M. Hetherington.

== Article categories ==
The journal publishes articles in the following categories:

- Original research articles
- Priority reports
- Research reviews
- Commentaries
- Letters
- Modelling/Theory and Methods papers
- Tansley reviews
- Tansley insights
- Viewpoints
- Community resources

== Abstracting and indexing ==
The journal is abstracted and indexed in the Science Citation Index Expanded, Current Contents/Agriculture, Biology & Environmental Sciences, and Scopus.

According to the Journal Citation Reports, the journal has a 2025 impact factor of 8.7.

== Previous Editors-in-Chief ==
- 1902–1931: Arthur Tansley
- 1931–1961: Roy Clapham, Harry Godwin and Will James
- 1961–1983: Jack Harley, John Burnett and Donald Pigott
- 1983–1995: David Lewis
- 1995–2002: Peter Ayres
- 2002–2012: Ian Woodward
- 2012–2024: Alistair Hetherington
- 2024 – present: Maarja Öpik

Sources: 1902–1983, 1995–2012, 2012 – present
