= Molecular Phylogenetics and Evolution =

Peer-reviewed scientific journal

- Discipline: Phylogeny, evolutionary biology
- Language: English
- Edited by: Guillermo Ortí

Publication details
- History: 1992–present
- Publisher: Academic Press (United States)
- Frequency: Monthly
- Impact factor: 4.286 (2020)

Standard abbreviations
- ISO 4: Mol. Phylogenetics Evol.

Indexing
- ISSN: 1055-7903
- LCCN: 93648932
- OCLC no.: 23325059

Links
- Journal homepage; Online archive

Molecular Phylogenetics and Evolution is a peer-reviewed scientific journal of evolutionary biology and phylogenetics. The journal is edited by E. A. Zimmer.

== Indexing ==
The journal is indexed in:

- EMBiology
- Journal Citation Reports
- Scopus
- Web of Science
