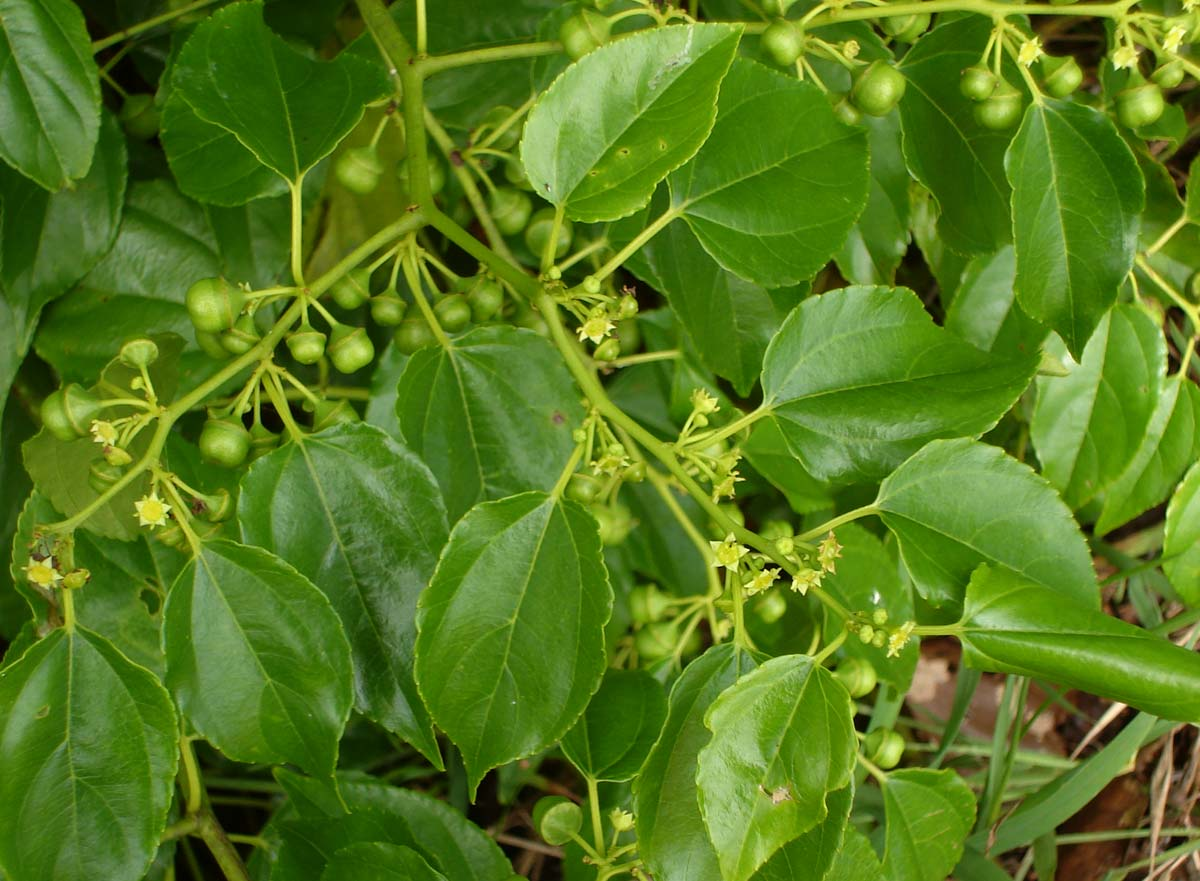

Conservation status
- Least Concern (IUCN 3.1)

Scientific classification
- Kingdom: Plantae
- Clade: Tracheophytes
- Clade: Angiosperms
- Clade: Eudicots
- Clade: Rosids
- Order: Rosales
- Family: Rhamnaceae
- Genus: Colubrina
- Species: C. asiatica

Binomial name
- Colubrina asiatica (L.) Brongn.

Synonyms
- Ceanothus asiaticus L.; Ceanothus capsularis G.Forst.; Paliurus asiaticus Noronha, nom. nud.; Pomaderris capsularis Montrouz.; Rhamnus acuminata Colebr. ex Roxb.; Rhamnus asiatica (L.) Poir.; Rhamnus scandens (Lour.) Spreng., nom. illeg. homonym. post.; Rhamnus splendens Blume; Sageretia splendens (Blume) G.Don; Tralliana scandens Lour.; Trymalium capsulare G.Don; Tubanthera katapa Raf.

= Colubrina asiatica =

Species of flowering plant

Colubrina asiatica is a shrub in the family Rhamnaceae that is native to tropical and subtropical regions of the Old World, from eastern Africa to India, southeast Asia, tropical Australia, and the Pacific Islands. Common names include latherleaf, Asian nakedwood, Asian snakewood, and ʻĀnapanapa (Hawaii).

== Description ==
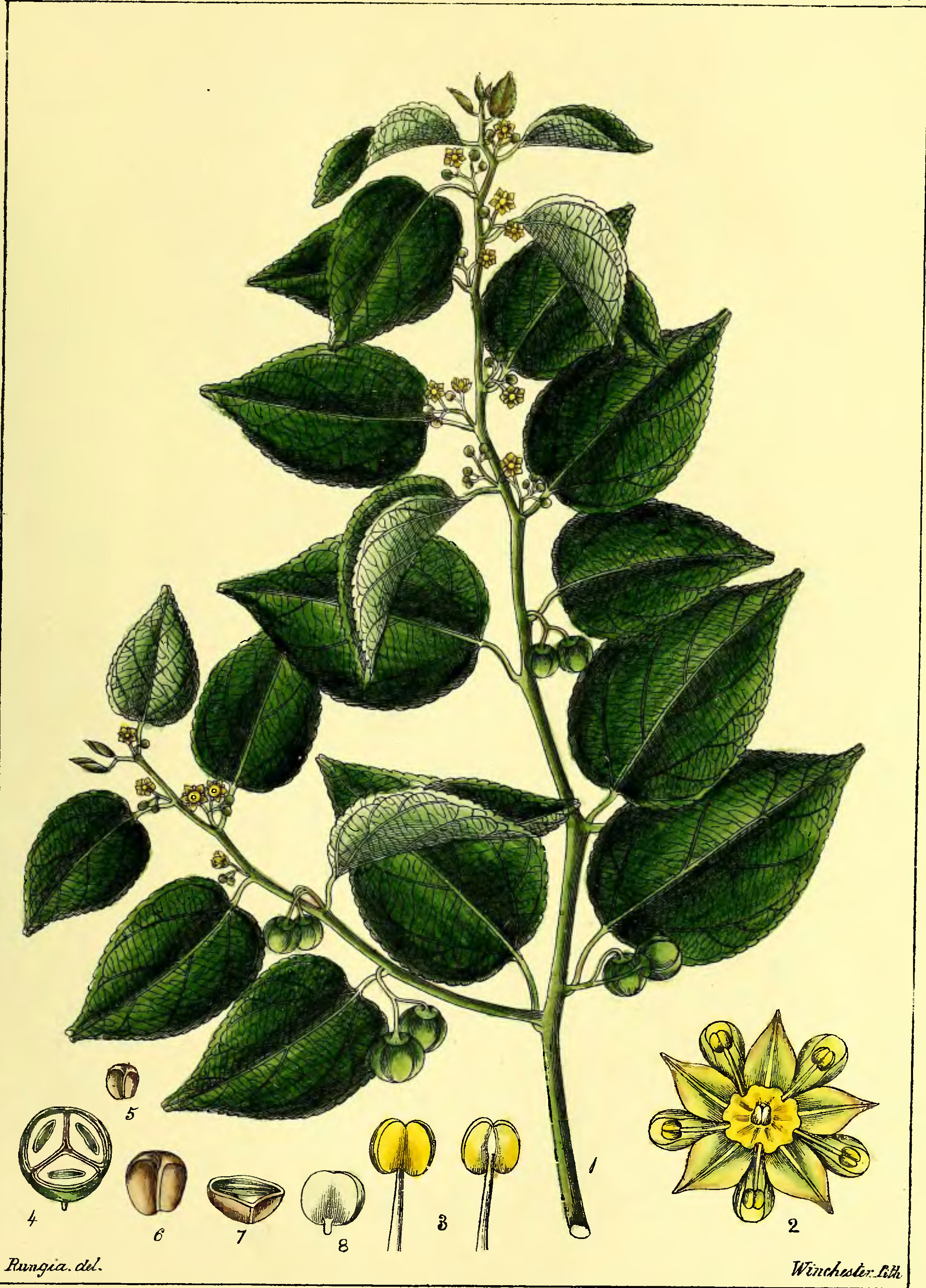
Colubrina asiatica in Illustrations of Indian Botany (1840).

Colubrina asiatica has a vine-like growth habit, sending out multiple stems that can reach 9 m (30 ft) in length. The branches have simple, alternate, glossy, ovate and acuminate leaves, 3.7–13.7 cm (1.5–5.4 in) long, with several prominent veins. Leaf margins are wavy or finely serrated (toothed). Flowers are small, greenish and bloom in clusters in leaf axils. Blooming can occur year-round. Fruit are 1.3 cm (0.51 in) berry-like capsules with small, gray seeds. Seeds float and are tolerant to salt water, which allows the species to spread across oceans.

The plants grow in full to partial sun on upland sites.

== Invasive species ==
In Florida in the United States, Colubrina asiatica is an invasive species, capable of displacing native plants and altering the ecosystem. It is listed as a Type 1 exotic invader by the Florida Exotic Pest Plant Council. It has been found in the southern part of the Florida peninsula, including in Miami-Dade, Broward, Collier, Lee and Martin counties, and in the Florida Keys (Monroe County). It was first collected in Florida in 1937.

== Applications ==
=== Fire suppression ===
Optimized by ultrasonic extraction, C. asiatica can suppress fire to a degree comparable with commercial suppressants while reducing environmental impacts.
