= New Zealand Plant Conservation Network =

- NZPCN Logo, which depicts the extinct Trilepidea adamsii
- Founded: 2003
- Type: NGO
- Purpose: New Zealand plants
- Website: www.nzpcn.org.nz

The New Zealand Plant Conservation Network (NZPCN) is a non-governmental organisation devoted to the protection and restoration of New Zealand's indigenous plant life, including vascular plants, mosses, liverworts, hornworts and lichens.

== Description ==
The Network was founded in 2003 and has a worldwide membership. The Network was established as a mechanism to aid the implementation of the New Zealand Biodiversity Strategy and the Global strategy for plant conservation. Members include botanists, non-governmental organisations, research institutes such as universities, private businesses, botanic gardens, schools, central and local government employees, members of the public, ecological restoration programmes, and private landowners.

Aims

The Network has a vision that "no indigenous species of plant will become extinct nor be placed at risk of extinction as a result of human action or indifference, and that the rich, diverse and unique plant life of New Zealand will be recognised, cherished and restored".

The Network works to disseminate indigenous plant information via its website and publications; coordinate the ex situ management of threatened plant species; deliver plant conservation training programmes; and undertake activities to protect threatened plant species and plant communities in situ.

Activities

Since the Network was founded it has built a plant conservation website that stores information about all indigenous and naturalised plants in New Zealand, established a national seed bank for threatened plants, and developed a plant conservation training programme for Māori.

Publications

The Network publishes Trilepidea, their monthly newsletter, and has published checklists of New Zealand indigenous vascular plants and naturalised plants. Plant conservation awards are given annually by the Network.
