= Mānuka honey =

Type of honey

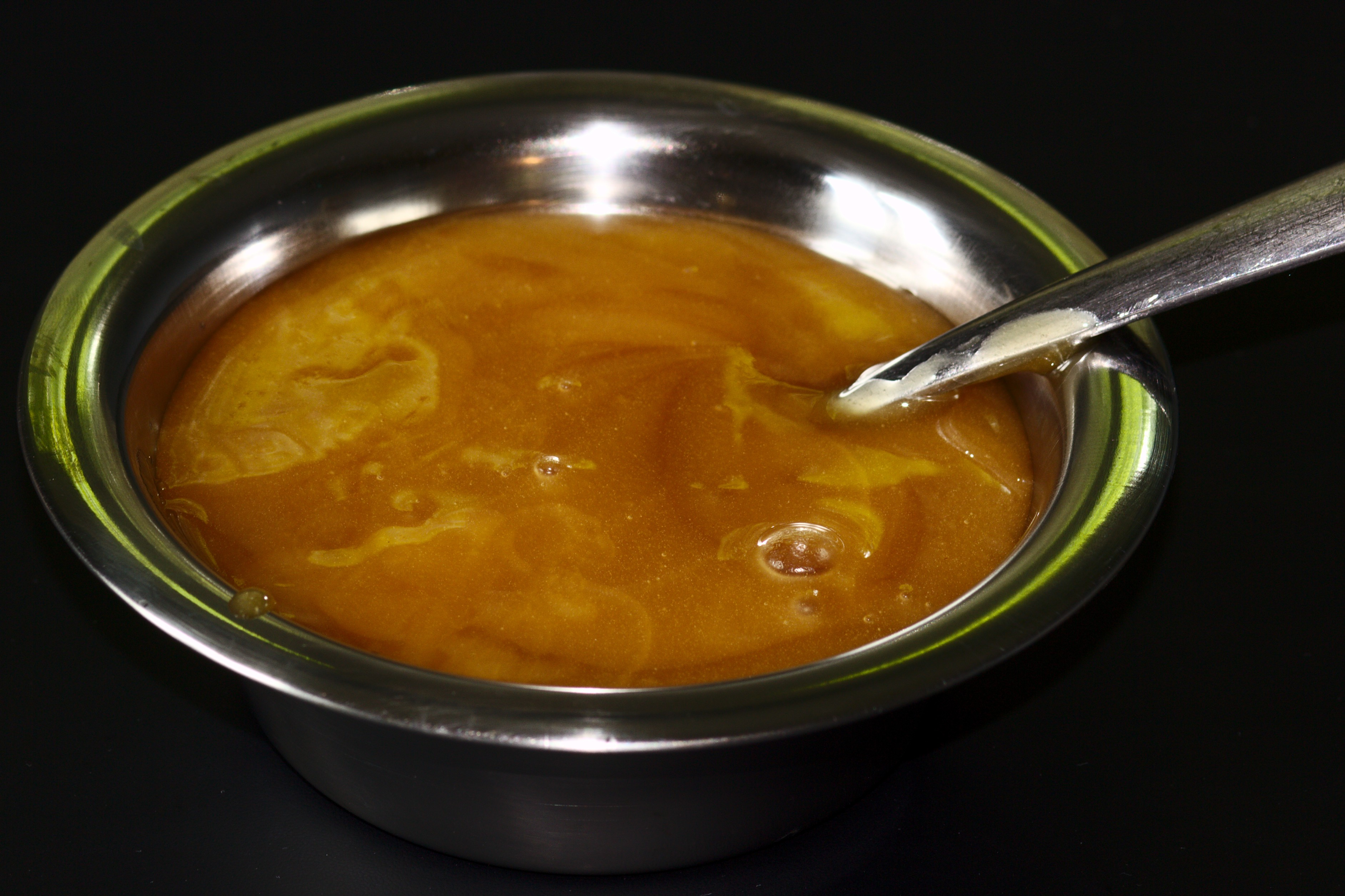
A bowl of visibly viscous mānuka honey

Mānuka honey (Māori pronunciation: [ˈmaːnʉka]) is a monofloral honey produced from the nectar of the mānuka tree, Leptospermum scoparium.

The mānuka tree is indigenous to New Zealand and parts of coastal Australia. The word mānuka is the Māori name of the tree; however, as with many Māori words, the older spelling manuka (without a macron) remains relatively common in English.

== Cultural significance ==
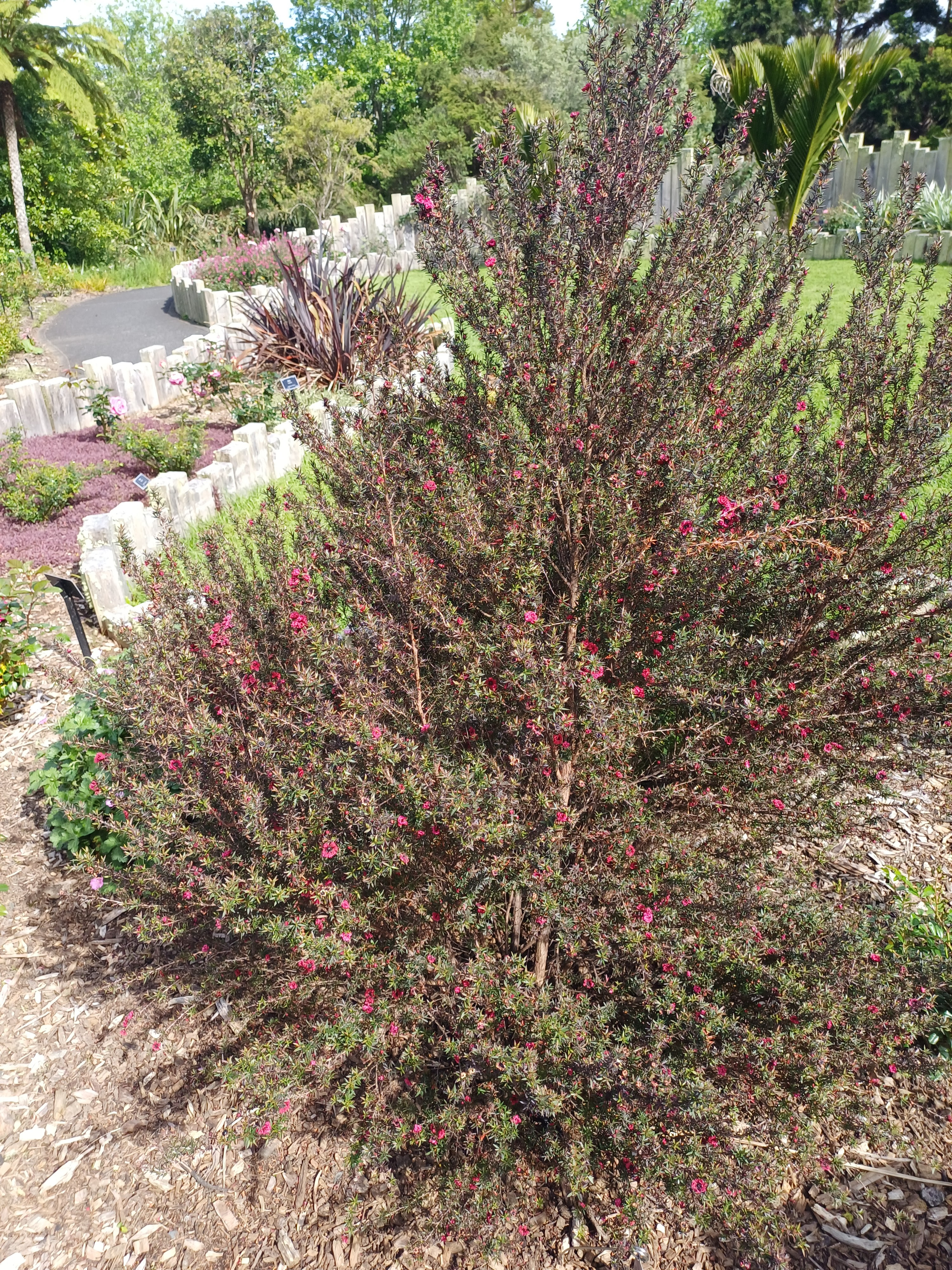
Mānuka garden at Auckland Botanic Gardens

The mānuka tree (Leptospermum scoparium), from which mānuka honey is derived, has long been regarded as a taonga (treasure) in Māori tradition. The plant was used in rongoā (traditional medicine), with infusions of the leaves taken for colds and fevers, and oils or poultices from the bark applied to wounds and skin conditions. In Māori cosmology, mānuka is associated with Tāne, the atua (god) of forests, reinforcing its status as a plant of mana (prestige) and spiritual significance.

In contemporary New Zealand, mānuka honey has become both a cultural emblem and a commercial product. It is frequently described as “liquid gold” in media and marketing, symbolising natural heritage and national identity. The honey is often presented as a premium gift in ceremonial contexts and is used to promote New Zealand’s image abroad. For Māori enterprises, mānuka honey production is also linked to cultural revitalisation and economic development, connecting indigenous stewardship of land with participation in global trade.

== Production ==
Mānuka honey is produced by European honey bees (Apis mellifera) foraging on the mānuka (Leptospermum scoparium), which evidence suggests originated in Australia before the onset of the Miocene aridity. It grows uncultivated throughout both southeastern Australia and New Zealand.

The mānuka tree flowers at the same time as Kunzea ericoides, another Myrtaceae species also called kānuka, which often shares the same growing areas. Some apiarists cannot readily differentiate these species, as both flowers have similar morphology and pollen differentiation between the two species is difficult.

There have been increasing turf disputes between producers operating close to large mānuka tree clumps. Cases have been reported of many hives being variously sabotaged, poisoned, or stolen.

== Characteristics and composition ==
Mānuka honey is composed primarily of fructose and glucose, with smaller amounts of sucrose and maltose, having a relatively higher total sugar content compared to Malaysian honeys. It is markedly viscous, has a dark cream to dark brown colour, and a strong flavour, characterised as "earthy, oily, herbaceous", and "florid, rich and complex". It is described by the New Zealand honey industry as having a "damp earth, heather, aromatic" aroma, and a "mineral, slightly bitter" flavour.

Mānuka honey contains leptosperin, lepteridine and 2′-methoxyacetophenone, which are unique to mānuka among honeys, as well as flavonoids and phenolic compounds. It also contains o-anisic acid, kojic acid, dihydroxyacetone, methylglyoxal, glyoxal, 3-deoxyglucosulose, methyl-syringate and leptosin.

== Identification and standardisation ==
Mānuka honey for export from New Zealand must be independently tested to verify that it is derived from the tree. The Ministry for Primary Industries has developed a government standard called the Mānuka Honey Science Definition test to ensure that all mānuka honey is pure when it leaves the country. The test has five attributes, four of which are chemical, and one of which is the DNA of Leptospermum scoparium. The honey must pass all five tests to be labeled as pure New Zealand mānuka honey. This testing came into effect on 5 January 2018. Independent quality and rating organisation the UMF Honey Association then certifies four quality factors for honey harvested, packed, and sealed in New Zealand.

The UMF Honey Association was originally known as the Active Mānuka Honey Association (AMHA), and was formed in 2002. In 2011, the AMHA became The Unique Manuka Factor Honey Association (UMFHA).

The Australian Mānuka Honey Association (AMHA) was established in 2017 following the discontinuation of the New Zealand Mānuka Honey industry's use of the acronym AMHA. They established a set of standards for authentic Australian mānuka honey to be pure natural mānuka honey, produced entirely in Australia, and be tested by an independent, approved laboratory to ensure it meets minimum standards of naturally occurring methylglyoxal (MGO), dihydroxyacetone (DHA), and leptosperin; authenticity carries the AMHA's Mark of Authenticity. The Australian standard of authencitiy requires that mānuka honey has at least 85 mg per kg of MGO and 170 mg per kg of DHA. According to the AMHA, "MGO is responsible for much of the special activity of mānuka honey", deriving from the honey chemical DHA, which occurs naturally in the flower nectar of mānuka trees.

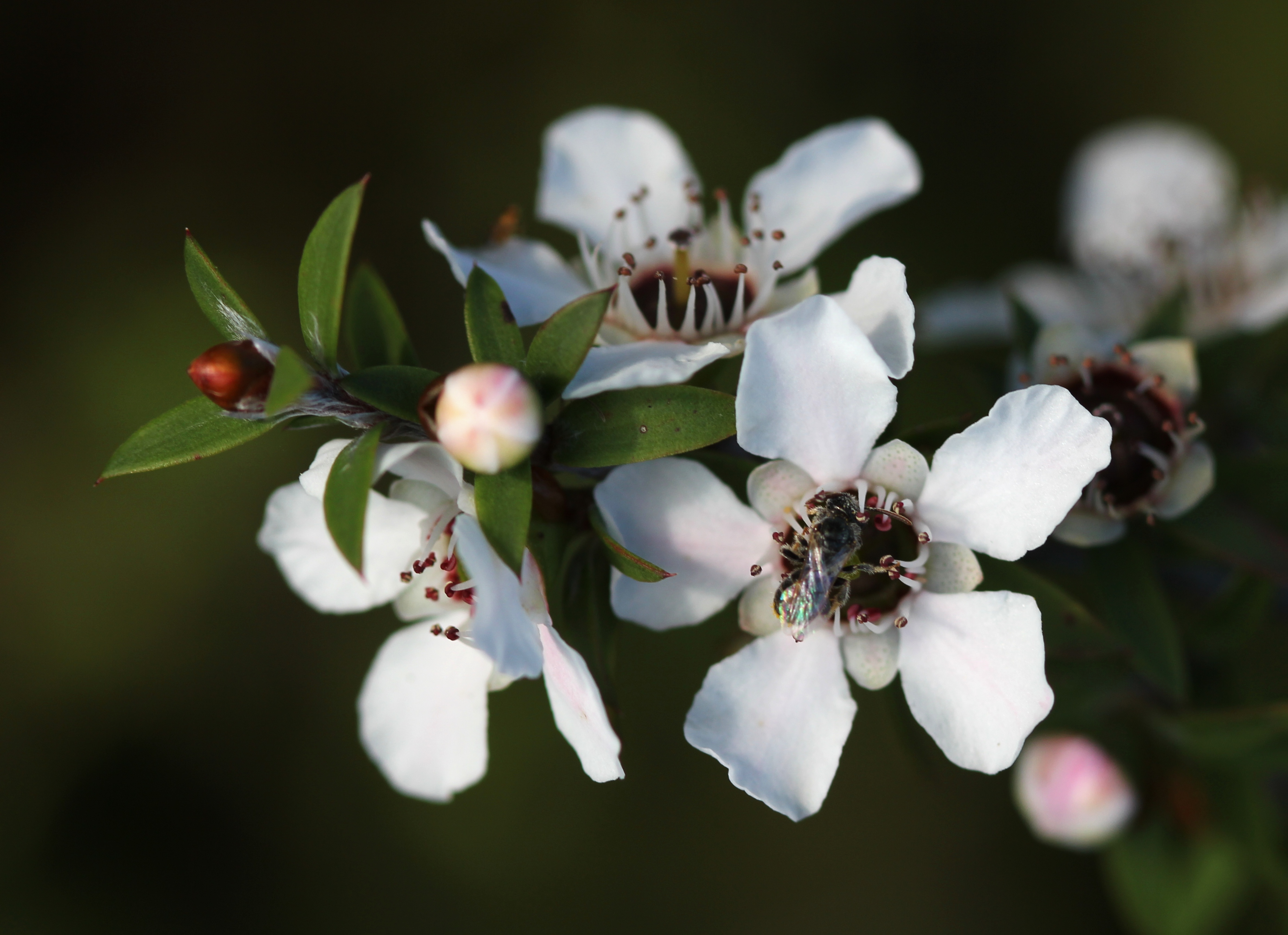
A bee visits a mānuka flower (Leptospermum)

In New Zealand, mānuka honey is graded by the amount of natural signature chemicals it contains, and is dual-graded using MGO (methylglyoxal) concentration in mg/kg and UMF (Unique Mānuka Factor). Blended (multifloral) mānuka is graded using the MGS system, which has a linear relationship with MGO value, but is numerically different from UMF.

In the UK, mānuka honey is graded with MGO and NPA (non-peroxide activity), which measures the non-peroxide activity in the honey. The NPA is positively correlated with MGO content, and is made to be numerically near-identical to the UMF.

Mānuka Honey Ratings from MGO
| MGO (mg/kg) | UMF/NPA | MGS (= 4 + MGO / 50) |
|---|---|---|
| 83 | 5 | 5.66 |
| 263 | 10 | 9.3 |
| 514 | 15 | 14.3 |
| 696 | 18 | 17.9 |
| 829 | 20 | 20.6 |
| 1122 | 24 | 26.4 |
| 1282 | 26 | 29.6 |
| 1450 | 28 | 33 |

There is also a K-factor rating, which counts the number of pollen particles, having no correlation with the concentration of any active chemical. UMF, MGS, and K-factor collectively indicate that the honey is genuine.

== Economics ==
Mānuka honey is one of New Zealand’s most valuable primary exports, commanding premium prices in international markets due to its distinctive chemical profile and reputation for quality. In 2020, mānuka honey exports were valued at approximately NZ$446 million, representing more than 90% of the country’s total honey export earnings. By 2024, export value had declined to NZ$387 million.

Industry analysts describe the sector as highly cyclical, with periods of rapid expansion followed by sharp contractions. Between 2020 and 2023, production volumes fell by more than 50%, while export demand dropped by over a quarter, leading to downward pressure on prices.

Although New Zealand remains the largest producer, mānuka honey is also harvested in Australia from related Leptospermum species, creating competition over branding and market access. Globally, mānuka honey accounts for a small fraction of total honey volume but a disproportionately high share of value. New Zealand produces only about 1% of the world’s honey by volume but captures nearly 9% of global trade value, largely due to mānuka exports.

Demand is concentrated in a handful of overseas markets. Research by New Zealand Trade and Enterprise found that in the United States, five brands controlled 84% of online mānuka honey sales in 2022, reflecting strong brand consolidation and barriers to entry for smaller producers. Other major markets include China, the United Kingdom, Germany, and Japan, where grading systems such as UMF (Unique Mānuka Factor) and MGO (methylglyoxal content) strongly influence price differentiation.

== Counterfeiting and adulteration ==
As a result of the high premium paid for mānuka honey, an increasing number of products now labeled as such worldwide are adulterated or counterfeit. According to research by the Unique Mānuka Factor Honey Association (UMFHA), the main trade association of New Zealand mānuka honey producers (New Zealand being the main producer of mānuka honey in the world), while only 1,700 tonnes (3.7 million pounds) of mānuka honey are produced in New Zealand every year, six times as much are marketed internationally as mānuka honey, of which 1,800 tonnes (4.0 million pounds) are in the UK alone.

In governmental agency tests in the UK between 2011 and 2013, a majority of mānuka-labeled honeys sampled lacked the non-peroxide anti-microbial activity of mānuka honey. Likewise, of 73 samples tested by UMFHA in Britain, China, and Singapore in 2012–13, 43 tested negative. Separate UMFHA tests in Hong Kong found that 14 out of 56 mānuka honeys sampled had been adulterated with syrup. In 2013, the UK Food Standards Agency asked trading standards authorities to alert mānuka honey vendors to the need for legal compliance.

The UMFHA trademarked a honey rating system called Unique Mānuka Factor, but there is a confusing range of competing rating systems for mānuka honeys. In one UK chain in 2013, two products were labeled "12+ active" and "30+ total activity", respectively, for "naturally occurring peroxide activity", and another "active 12+" for "total phenol activity", yet none of the three was labeled for strength of the non-peroxide antimicrobial activity specific to mānuka honey.

== FDA warning letters ==
Between 2022 and 2025, the US FDA issued warning letters to four manufacturers (including an Australian company) of mānuka honey products advertised as eye therapies, and one claiming anti-allergic properties. The FDA stated that these manufacturers were advertising unapproved drugs, making false health claims, and engaging in illegal interstate commerce of misbranded drugs.

== See also ==
- Eucalyptus honey – Monofloral honey from eucalyptus trees
- Apitherapy – Pseudoscientific alternative medical therapy using bee products
- Beekeeping in Australia
- Beekeeping in New Zealand
