= Beekeeping in New Zealand =

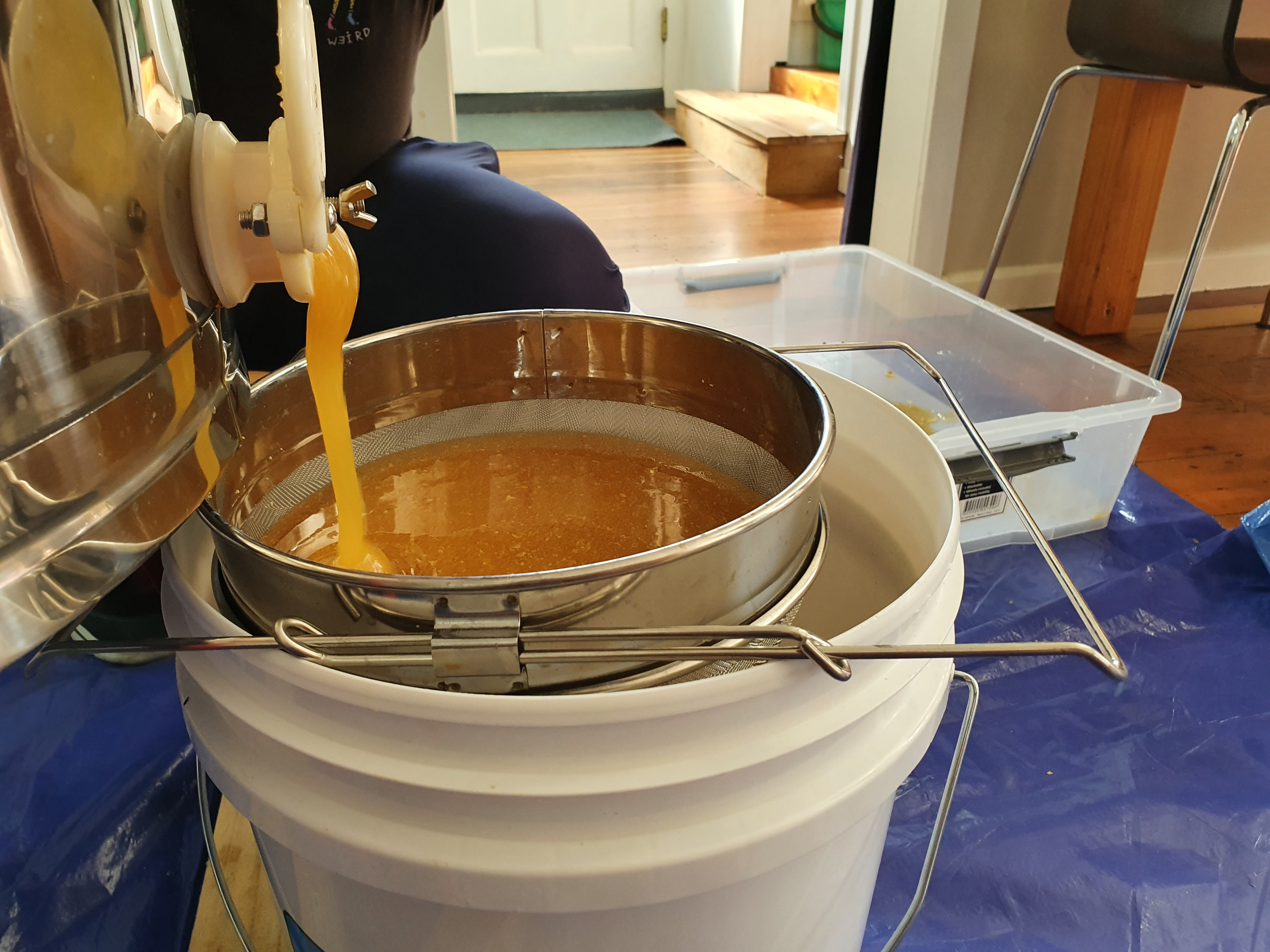
Using a honey extractor to process honeycomb from urban hives in Auckland, New Zealand

Beekeeping in New Zealand is reported to have commenced in 1839 with the importing of two skep hives by Mary Bumby, a missionary. It has since become an established industry as well a hobby activity.

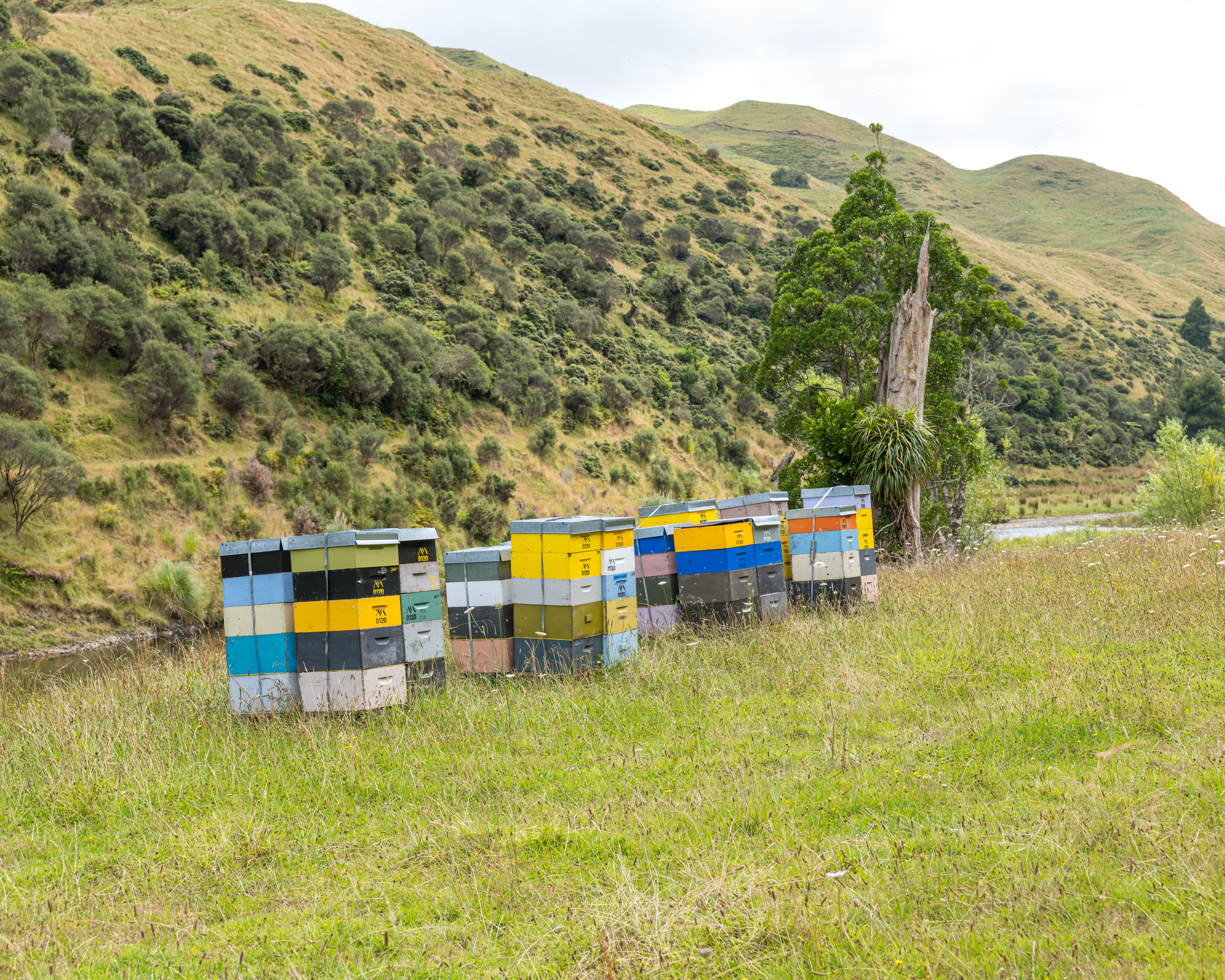
Beehives by the Awakino River

== History ==
Although New Zealand has a lot (exactly 28) of native bee species (collectively called ngaro huruhuru "furry flies") in its ecosystem, these species tend to live underground and yield too small an amount of honey for any significant gathering. European honeybees were brought to New Zealand in 1839; the Māori noted of them as “the white man’s fly.” William Cotton produced the Māori language book Ko Ngā Pī ('On Bees') in 1849 after a long period of teaching ways of beekeeping to the local Māori in his area while they taught him their language in return. Māori beekeepers produced unique beehives based on their knowledge of basket-weaving.

Commercial beekeeping began in 1878 soon after the introduction of the Langstroth hive.

Isaac Hopkins (1837–1925) has been called the “father of beekeeping” in New Zealand. He arrived in 1858 and went on to become a successful beekeeper, government apiarist and inspector of apiaries. He is the author of The illustrated New Zealand bee manual (1881) and The illustrated Australasian bee manual (1886). In his will he bequeathed £3000 to the Cawthron Institute in Nelson, New Zealand, for bee research.

== Industry ==
New Zealand had 6,735 registered beekeepers in June 2016, who owned more than 600,000 hives in over 42,000 apiaries. In 2015/16 total honey production was 19.8 thousand tonnes. The production of mānuka honey, valued for its antibacterial properties, is increasingly important. Pollen, beeswax, and propolis are also produced and exported. Beekeepers provide pollination services to horticulturists, which used to generate more income than the products of bee culture. However, rising honey prices have pushed pollination fees to keep up. Approximately 42 thousand live queen bees, and 38 tonnes of packaged bees (which include approximately one kilogram of worker bees to support the queen) are exported live each year.

The National Beekeepers' Association of New Zealand established "National Bee Week".

The Green Party are calling for a phase out of pesticides that are toxic to bees as is happening in the European Union.

Honey containing the poisonous tutin can be produced by bees feeding on honeydew produced by sap-sucking vine hopper insects (genus Scolypopa) feeding on tutu, a plant native to New Zealand. The last recorded deaths from eating honey containing tutin were in the 1890s.

In May 2011 there were fears the colony collapse disorder had begun in New Zealand. Losses of up to 30% had been reported with Canterbury and Poverty Bay being hardest hit. This suspicion was not confirmed, but high losses with an aetiology matching CCD could be observed in parts of the North Island in 2015, reigniting these fears.

There were 925,000 registered hives in New Zealand by 2019.

== Pest and diseases ==
Pests include Nosema apis, Malpighamoeba mellifica and acarine mites. American foulbrood is present in a small percentage of hives with Sac brood and Chalk brood occurring in isolated cases.

=== American foulbrood ===
American foulbrood has been present in New Zealand since 1877.

=== European foulbrood ===
European foulbrood is not present in New Zealand. In the 1990s suspected cases of European foulbrood were found and a wider survey of hives was carried out but the samples proved to be negative.

=== Varroa mite ===
The Varroa destructor mite, a parasite that attacks honey bees, was discovered in the North Island of New Zealand in 2000 and the South Island in 2008. The Varroa mite is classed as a "Notifiable Organism" under the Biosecurity Act.

== Legislation ==
Former or current legislation relevant to beekeeping in New Zealand include:

- Apiaries Act 1908
- Apiaries Act 1969 (repealed)
- Resource Management Act 1991
- Biosecurity Act 1993
- Local Government Act 2002

There is also legislation relating to the bee products themselves.

== Noted beekeepers ==
- Josip Babich
- William Cotton
- Marianne Gittos
- Edmund Hillary
- Isaac Hopkins
- William Jordan

== See also ==
- Agriculture in New Zealand
- Biosecurity in New Zealand
- Pollinators in New Zealand
