= Gittos =

Gittos is a surname. Notable people with the surname include:

- Austen Gittos (1923–1986), New Zealand fencer, brother of Murray
- Marianne Gittos (1830–1908), Wesleyan mission worker
- Murray Gittos (1920–2014), New Zealand fencer
