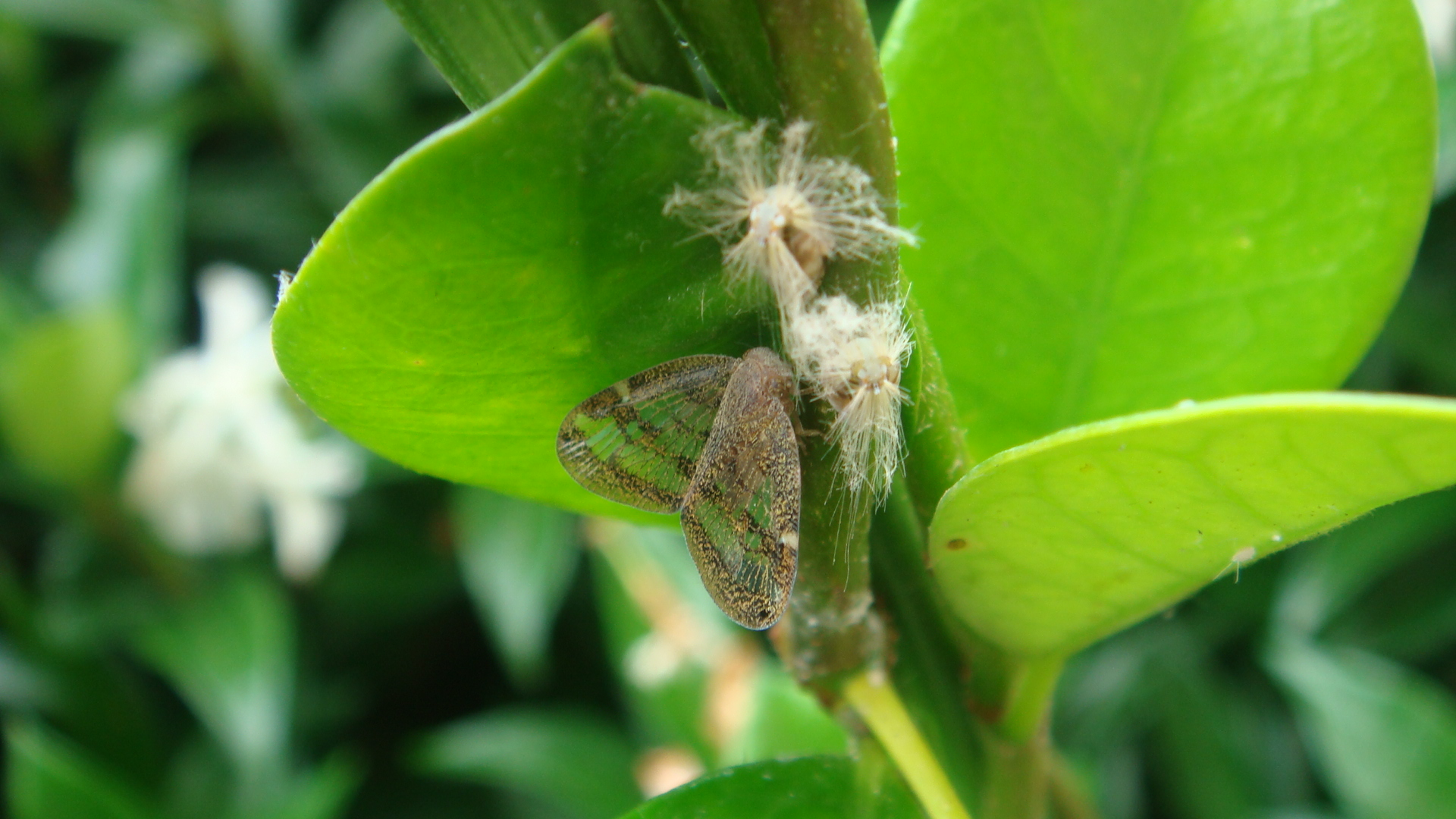
- An adult and two nymphs

Scientific classification
- Kingdom: Animalia
- Phylum: Arthropoda
- Clade: Pancrustacea
- Class: Insecta
- Order: Hemiptera
- Suborder: Auchenorrhyncha
- Infraorder: Fulgoromorpha
- Family: Ricaniidae
- Genus: Scolypopa
- Species: S. australis

Binomial name
- Scolypopa australis (Walker, 1851)

= Scolypopa australis =

Species of true bug

Scolypopa australis, commonly known as the passionvine hopper, is a species of insect in the Ricaniidae family of planthoppers (Fulgoroidea) that is native to Australia and was introduced to New Zealand. Despite its name, they are found not only on passion vines, but on many plant species, including kiwifruit and the lantana. Brown with partly transparent wings, they are 5–6 mm long as adults and 5 mm as nymphs. As an adult they look somewhat like a moth to the untrained eye, and walk "like a ballerina". The nymphs are wingless and are informally known as fluffy bums. When sufficiently aroused they will hop off their plant "with a 'snap'". Like all planthoppers they suck plant sap. This leaves a honeydew secretion which bees gather.

== In New Zealand ==
They were first recorded in New Zealand in 1878, where they are among over 40 species of planthopper, mostly native, but including the introduced Siphanta acuta (green planthoppers), Achilus flammeus (red fingernail bugs) and Anzora unicolor (grey planthoppers), all from Australia. They may be a vector of the 'sudden decline' disease caused by Phytoplasma australiense that has affected the native cabbage tree (Cordyline australis), and are a common pest in gardens. They are also found in regrowing forest. They are very common in the summer and autumn north of Nelson. Honey produced by honey bees that consume honeydew secreted on tutin containing tutu plants is known to cause honey poisoning.

== Gallery ==
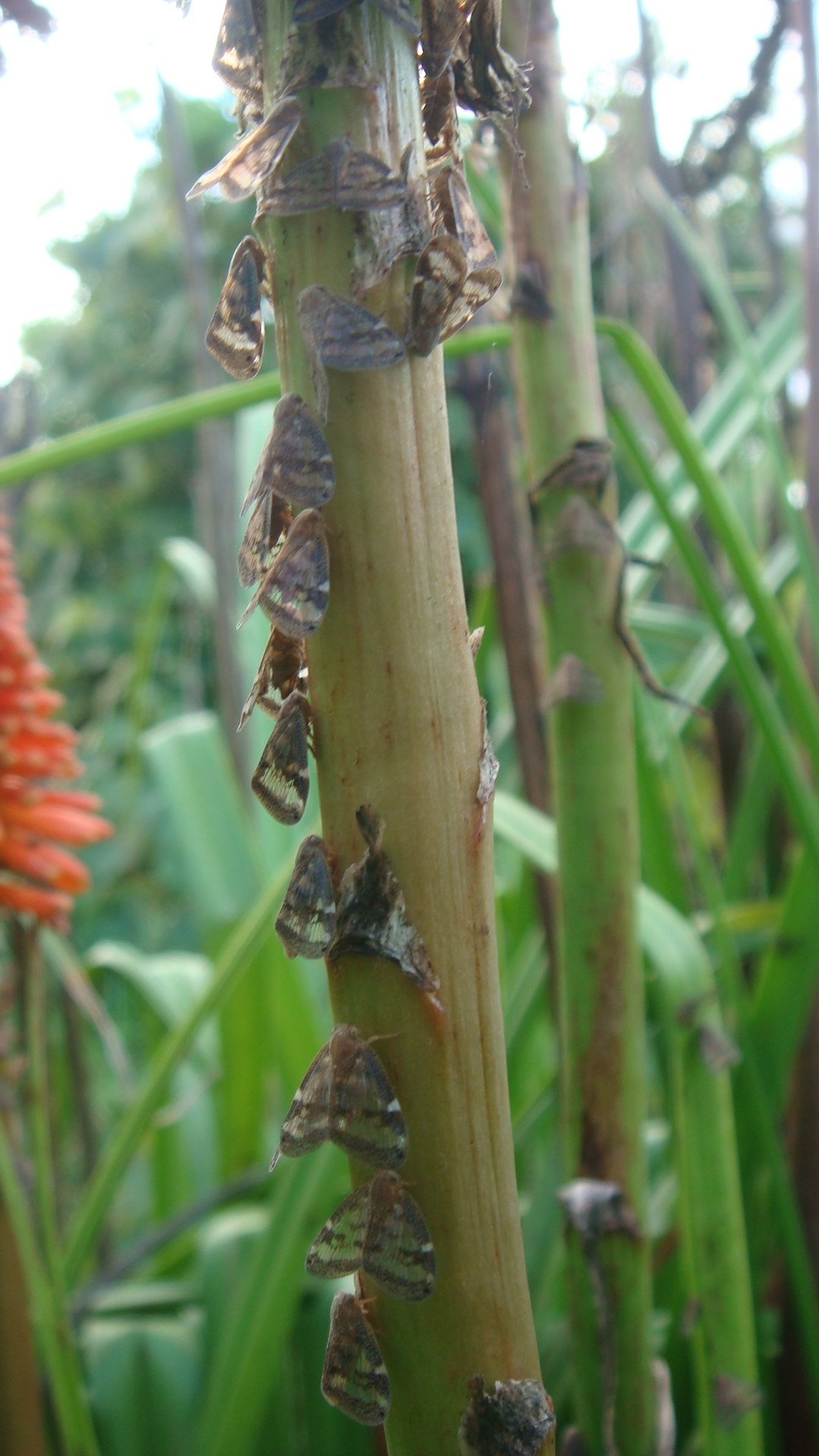
Many on Kniphofia uvaria

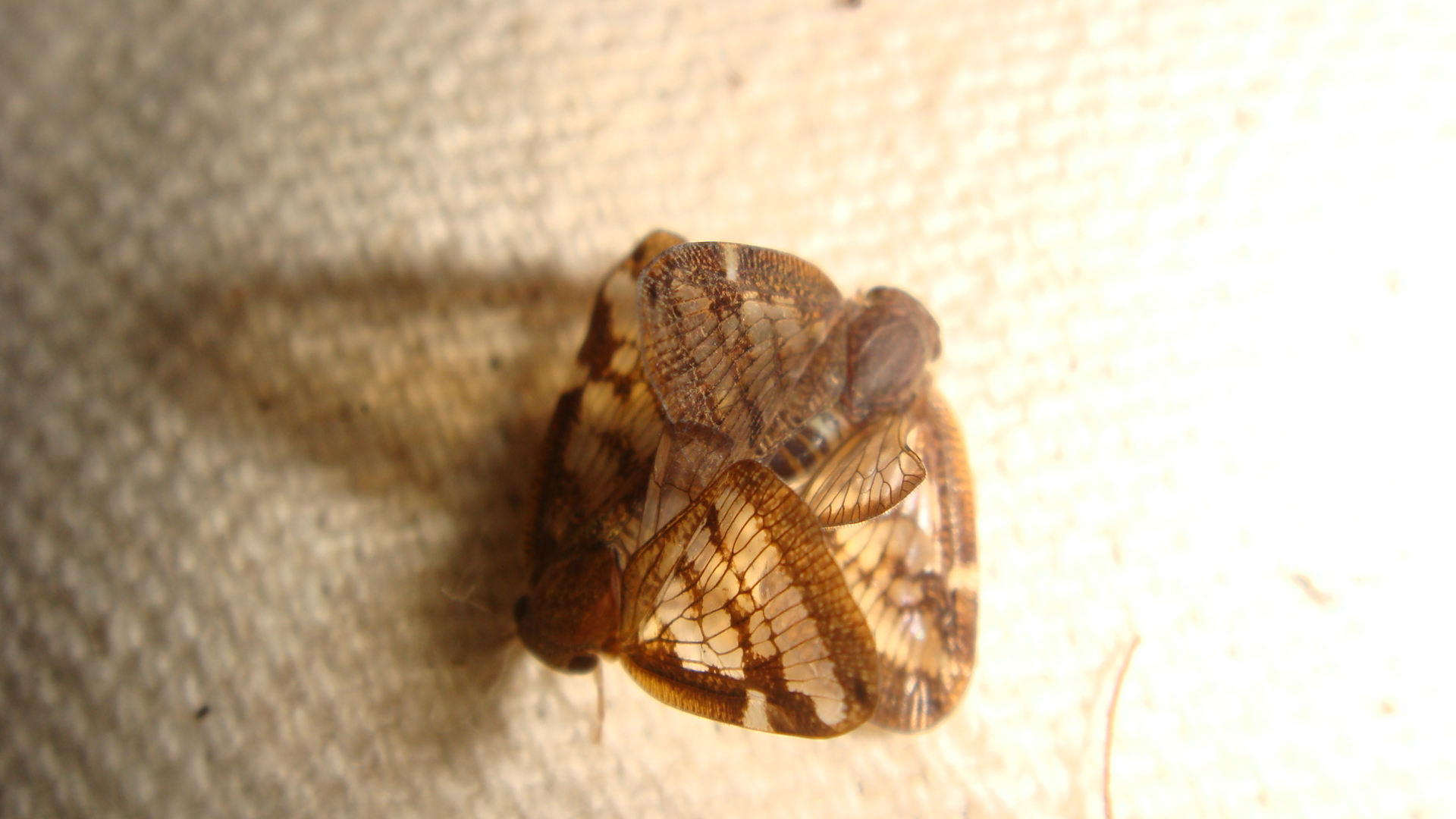
Mating

Moving on New Zealand flax

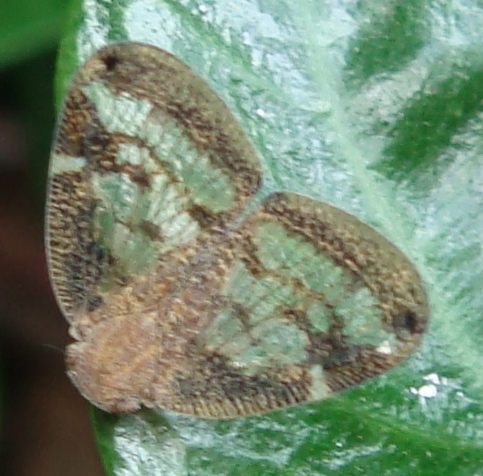
Adult on a leaf

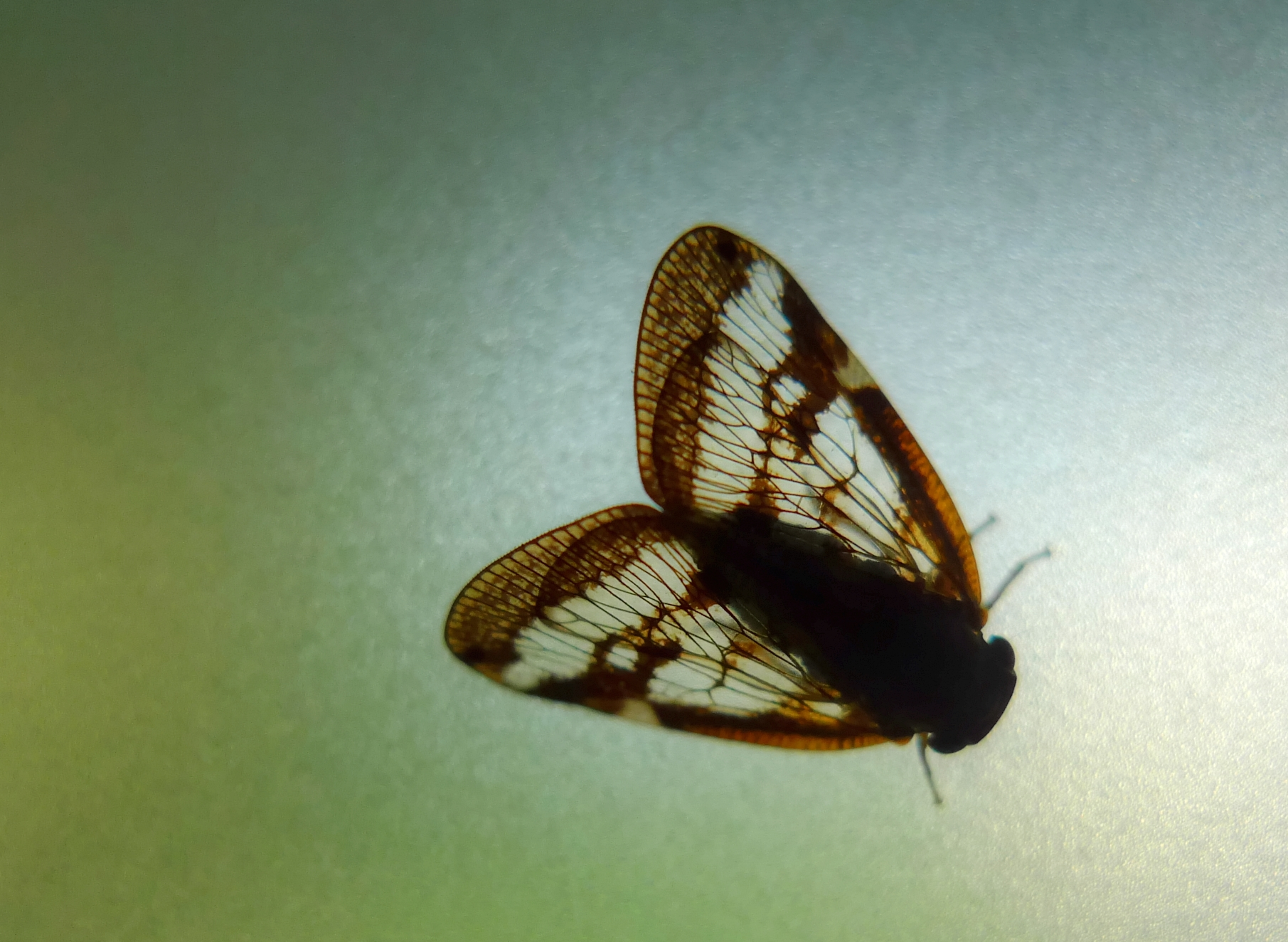
Scolypopa australis against frosted glass

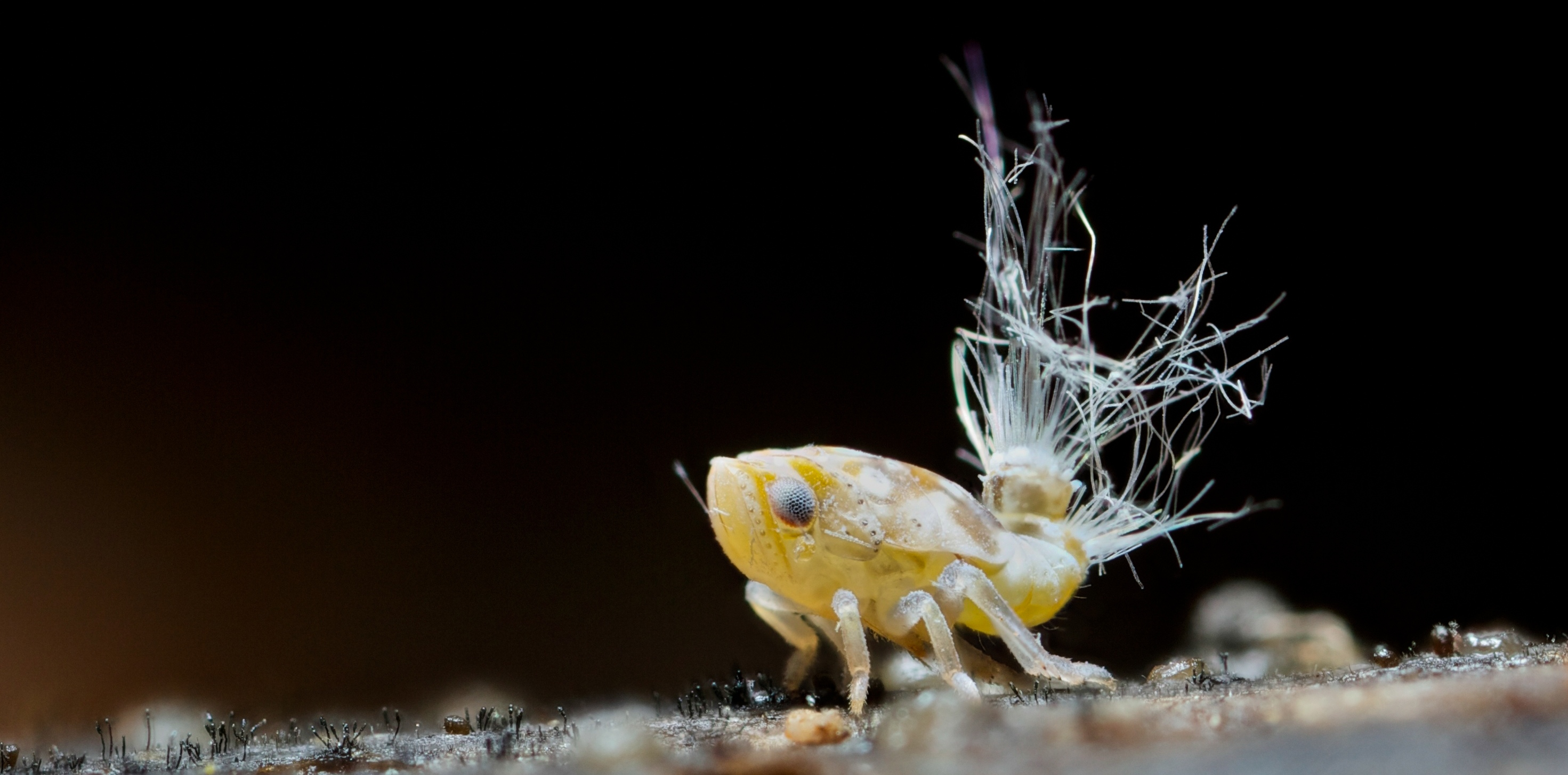
Nymph
