= Eucalyptus honey =

Monofloral honey from eucalyptus trees

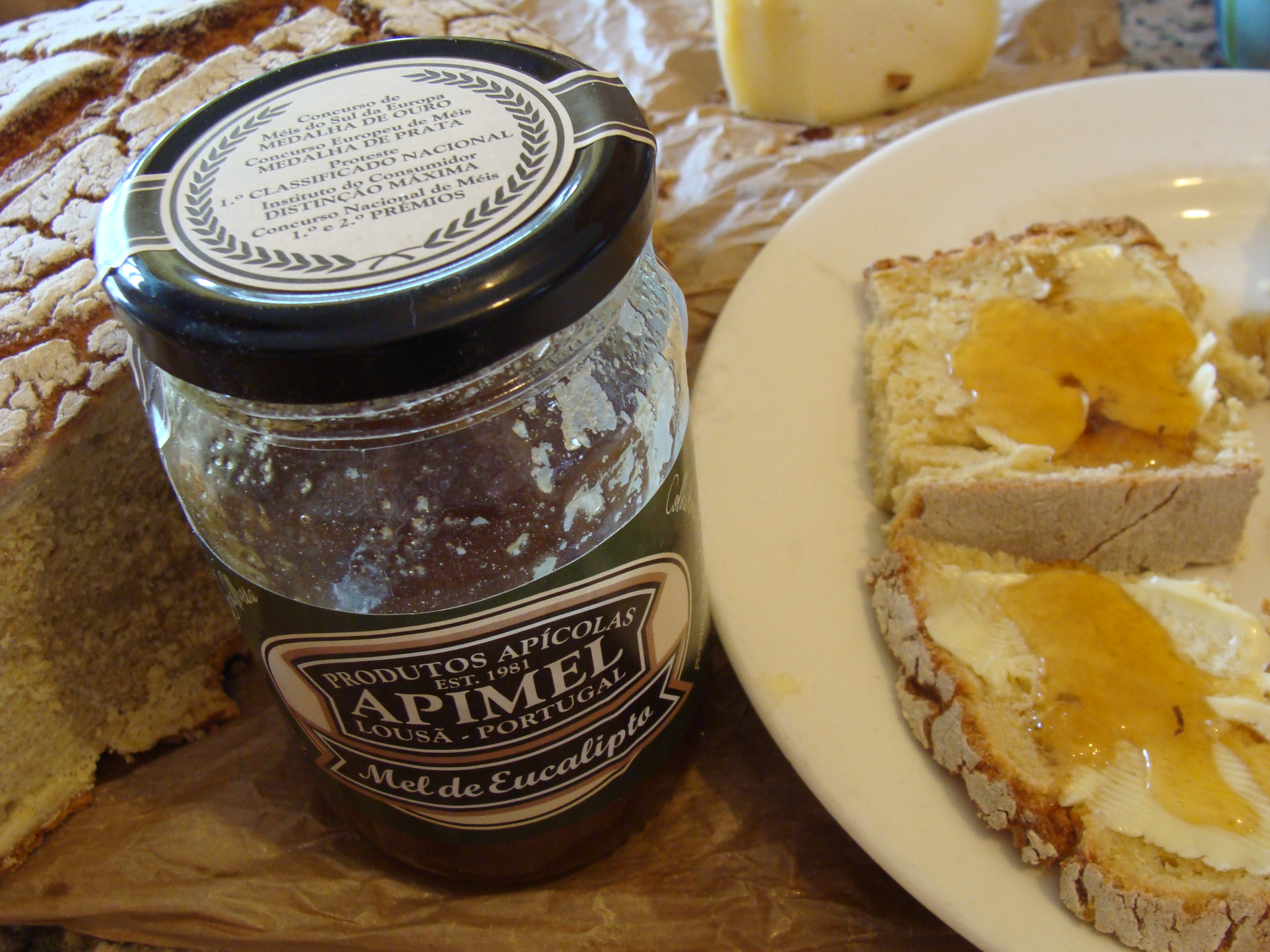
Eucalyptus honey

Eucalyptus honey is a type of honey made by honeybees that forage on the nectar of eucalyptus tree flowers. Eucalyptus honey is prized for its natural health benefits including antibacterial properties, antifungal properties, high antioxidant levels and ability to relieve coughs, sore throats, and respiratory ailments.

== Distribution ==
Eucalyptus trees are native to Australia, but are now grown in various parts of the world, including South America, Europe and Asia.

Consequently, the honey is common in Australia, but also in Western Cape in South Africa and in Brazil. Globally, most eucalyptus honey comes from Australia and South Africa. Many varieties of eucalyptus honey come from trees found all over the world, from tropical to temperate regions.

In the United States, it comes from California, where more than 500 different subspecies of the plant are grown.

== Variations ==
In Australia, there are 780 species of eucalyptus trees – each available for bees to forage on and produce eucalyptus honey. Eucalyptus honey varies greatly in colour and flavour, but in general, it tends to be a bold-flavoured honey that ranges from tart to sweet, with a slightly medicinal aftertaste. Its colour ranges from light amber to medium-dark red. It may be used in baked goods, sauces, dressings, but is best consumed raw, unfiltered and unheated.

The most common sub-varietals of eucalyptus honey are jarrah (Eucalyptus marginata), yellow box (Eucalyptus melliodora), grey box, blue gum (Eucalyptus globulus), blackbutt-dwutta (Eucalyptus todtiana) and blackbutt-yarri (Eucalyptus patens). Each specific eucalyptus species creates honey with unique flavours, nutritional properties and textures.

== Health benefits ==
Traditionally, Indigenous Australians used eucalyptus leaves and honey for health benefits, including respiratory relief and wound care. In modern medicine, scientific studies further promote the health benefits associated with honey. These findings suggest that eucalyptus honey (particularly from Western Australia) is rich in properties that make it a functional food.

=== Antioxidant activity ===
Eucalyptus honeys exhibit significant antioxidant activity, attributed to their rich phenolic content. The phenolic compounds identified in eucalyptus honeys include gallic acid, chlorogenic acid and quercetin, which contribute to their antioxidant properties. Eucalyptus honeys demonstrated higher antioxidant activity than some other honeys.

=== Antibacterial activity ===
Jarrah honey in particular demonstrates significant antibacterial effects against both Gram-positive and Gram-negative bacteria, with minimum inhibitory concentrations (MICs) ranging from 6.7% to 28.0% (w/v). The antibacterial activity is primarily attributed to the presence of hydrogen peroxide. Jarrah honey is effective in reducing biofilm formation and pigment production in bacteria. Application of jarrah honey to existing biofilms decreased bacterial metabolic activity and viability, indicating potential for treating biofilm-associated infections in wound care.

=== Antifungal activity ===
Jarrah honey is effective in inhibiting dermatophyte fungi responsible for skin infections such as athlete's foot and ringworm. The MICs range from 1.5% to 3.5% (w/v). Microscopic examinations revealed that jarrah honey impeded the germination of Trichophyton rubrum conidia (spores). Scanning electron microscopy showed structural deformities in mature T. rubrum hyphae, including bulging and collapsed regions, after treatment with the jarrah honey.

Despite the evident structural damage to fungal cells, internal oxidative stress was not detected, suggesting that jarrah honey's antifungal effects are primarily surface-active, possibly due to the localized production of hydrogen peroxide and other bioactive compounds. Jarrah honey is therefore a natural antifungal agent, particularly against dermatophyte infections. Its efficacy is largely attributed to the production of hydrogen peroxide, which disrupts fungal cell structures without inducing internal oxidative stress.

== See also ==
- Mānuka honey
- Apitherapy
- Beekeeping in Australia
- Beekeeping in New Zealand
