= Tutin =

Tutin may refer to:

== Places ==
- Tutin, Serbia, town in Serbia

== Surname ==
- Arthur Tutin (1907–1961), English footballer
- Dorothy Tutin (1930–2001), English actress
- Mary Tutin, maiden name of Mary Gillick (1881–1965), English sculptor
- Tom Tutin (1908–1987), botanist, co-author of several floras

== Chemistry ==
- Tutin (toxin), a glycine receptor antagonist found in the New Zealand tutu plant
