= Bees and toxic chemicals =

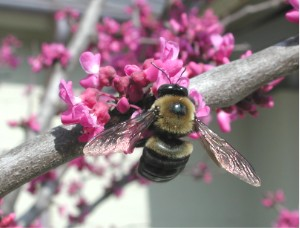
A male Xylocopa virginica (Eastern Carpenter bee) on Redbud (Cercis canadensis)

Bees can suffer serious effects from toxic chemicals in their environments. These include various synthetic chemicals, particularly insecticides, as well as a variety of naturally occurring chemicals from plants, such as ethanol resulting from the fermentation of organic materials. Bee intoxication can result from exposure to ethanol from fermented nectar, ripe fruits, and manmade and natural chemicals in the environment.

The effects of alcohol on bees are sufficiently similar to the effects of alcohol on humans that honey bees have been used as models of human ethanol intoxication. The metabolism of bees and humans is sufficiently different that bees can safely collect nectars from plants that contain compounds toxic to humans. The honey produced by bees from these toxic nectars can be poisonous if consumed by humans. In addition, natural processes can introduce toxic substances into honey produced from nontoxic nectar.

== Ethanol ==
=== Effects of intoxication ===
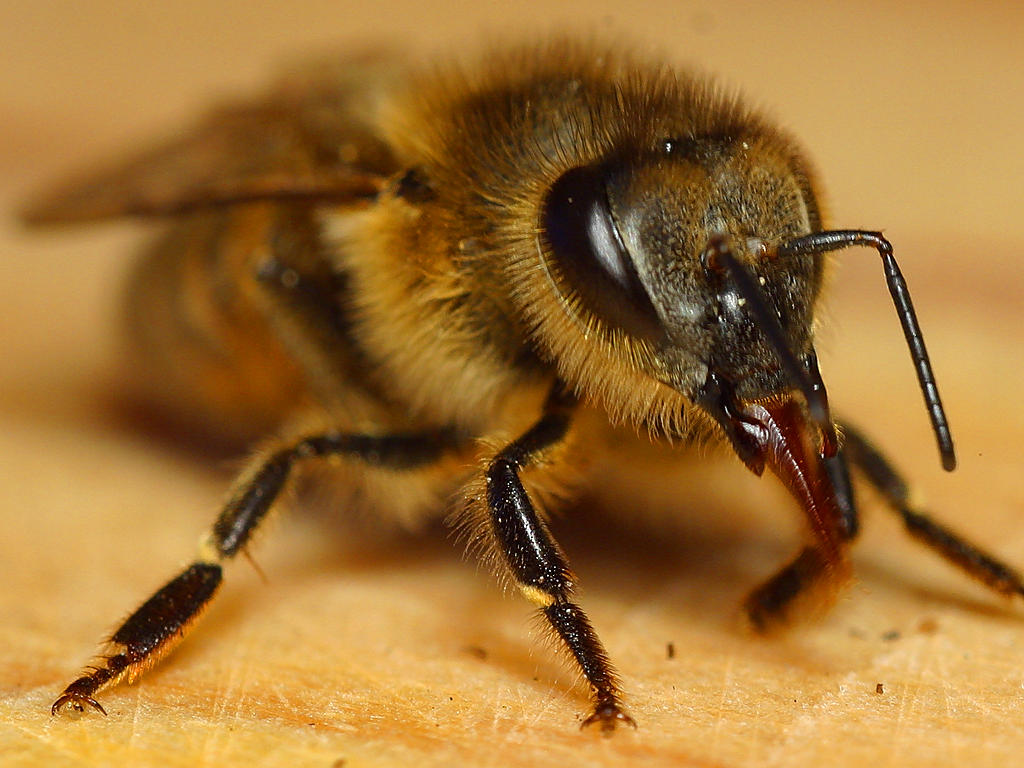
Bee showing its proboscis

The introduction of certain chemical substances—such as ethanol or pesticides or defensive toxic biochemicals produced by plants—to a bee's environment can cause the bee to display abnormal or unusual behavior and disorientation. In sufficient quantities, such chemicals can poison and even kill the bee. The effects of alcohol on bees have long been recognized. For example, John Cumming described the effect in an 1864 publication on beekeeping.

When bees become intoxicated from ethanol consumption or poisoned with other chemicals, their balance is affected. Charles Abramson's group at Oklahoma State University has put inebriated bees on running wheels, where they exhibit locomotion difficulties. They also put honey bees in shuttle-boxes that used a stimulus to encourage the bees to move, and found that they were less mobile as they became more intoxicated.

An intoxicated bee often extends its proboscis. Inebriated bees spend more time flying. If a bee is sufficiently intoxicated, it becomes unable to walk. Inebriated bees typically have many more flying accidents. Some bees that consume ethanol become too inebriated to find their way back to the hive, and die as a result. Bozic et al. (2006) found that alcohol consumption by honeybees disrupts foraging and social behaviors, and has some similar effects to poisoning with insecticides. Some bees become more aggressive after consuming alcohol.

Exposure to alcohol can have a prolonged effect on bees, lasting as long as 48 hours. This phenomenon is also observed in fruit flies and is connected to the neurotransmitter octopamine in fruit flies, which is also present in bees.

=== Bees as ethanol inebriation models ===
In 1999, David Sandeman suggested that bee inebriation models may be valuable for understanding vertebrate ethanol intoxication, given the homology and convergence of insect and vertebrate nervous systems.

The bees are fed ethanol solutions and their behavior observed. Researchers place the bees in harnesses, and feed them varying concentrations of alcohol in into sugar solutions. Tests of locomotion, foraging, social interaction and aggressiveness are performed; functioning is impaired much as in humans. The interaction of bees with antabuse (disulfiram, a treatment for alcoholism) has been tested as well.

== Bee exposure to other toxic and inebriating chemicals ==
=== Synthetic chemicals ===
Bees can be severely and even fatally affected by pesticides, fertilizers, copper sulfate and other chemicals that man has introduced into the environment.

This problem has been the object of growing concern. For example, researchers at the University of Hohenheim are studying how bees can be poisoned by exposure to seed disinfectants. In France, the Ministry of Agriculture commissioned an expert group, the Scientific and Technical Committee for the Multifactorial Study on Bees (CST), to study the intoxicating and sometimes fatal effects of chemicals used in agriculture on bees. Researchers at the Bee Research Institute and the Department of Food Chemistry and Analysis in the Czech Republic have pondered the intoxicating effects of various chemicals used to treat winter rapeseed crops. Romania suffered a severe case of widespread bee intoxication and extensive bee mortality from deltamethrin in 2002. The United States Environmental Protection Agency has published standards for testing chemicals for bee intoxication.

=== Natural compounds ===
Bees can be substantially affected by natural compounds in the environment besides ethanol. For example, Dariusz Szlachetko of the Department of Plant Taxonomy and Nature Conservation, Gdańsk University observed wasps in Poland acting in a very sleepy (possibly inebriated) manner after eating nectar derived from the North American orchid Neottia.

Detzel and Wink (1993) published an extensive review of 63 types of plant allelochemicals and their effects on bees. 39 chemical compounds repelled bees (primarily alkaloids, coumarins, and saponins), while three terpene compounds attracted bees. They reported that 17 out of 29 allelochemicals are toxic at some levels (especially alkaloids, saponins, cardiac glycosides and cyanogenic glycosides).

Various plants have pollen toxic to honey bees, in some cases killing the adults, as in Toxicoscordion; in other cases weakening the brood, as in Heliconia. Other plants with toxic pollen include Spathodea campanulata and Ochroma lagopus. Both the pollen and nectar of the California Buckeye (Aesculus californica) are toxic to honeybees.

=== Heavy metals from plants ===
Heavy metals are naturally occurring on terrestrial environments, by anthropogenic activities (such as mining, pesticide use, and industrial waste) are responsible for increasing exposure of toxic metals in soils.

Plants that grow in soils with high concentrations of heavy metals can affect the health and foraging behaviour of pollinators, including honey bees and bumblebees, by assimilating heavy metal compounds into honey or pollen.

=== Bee inebriation in pollination ===
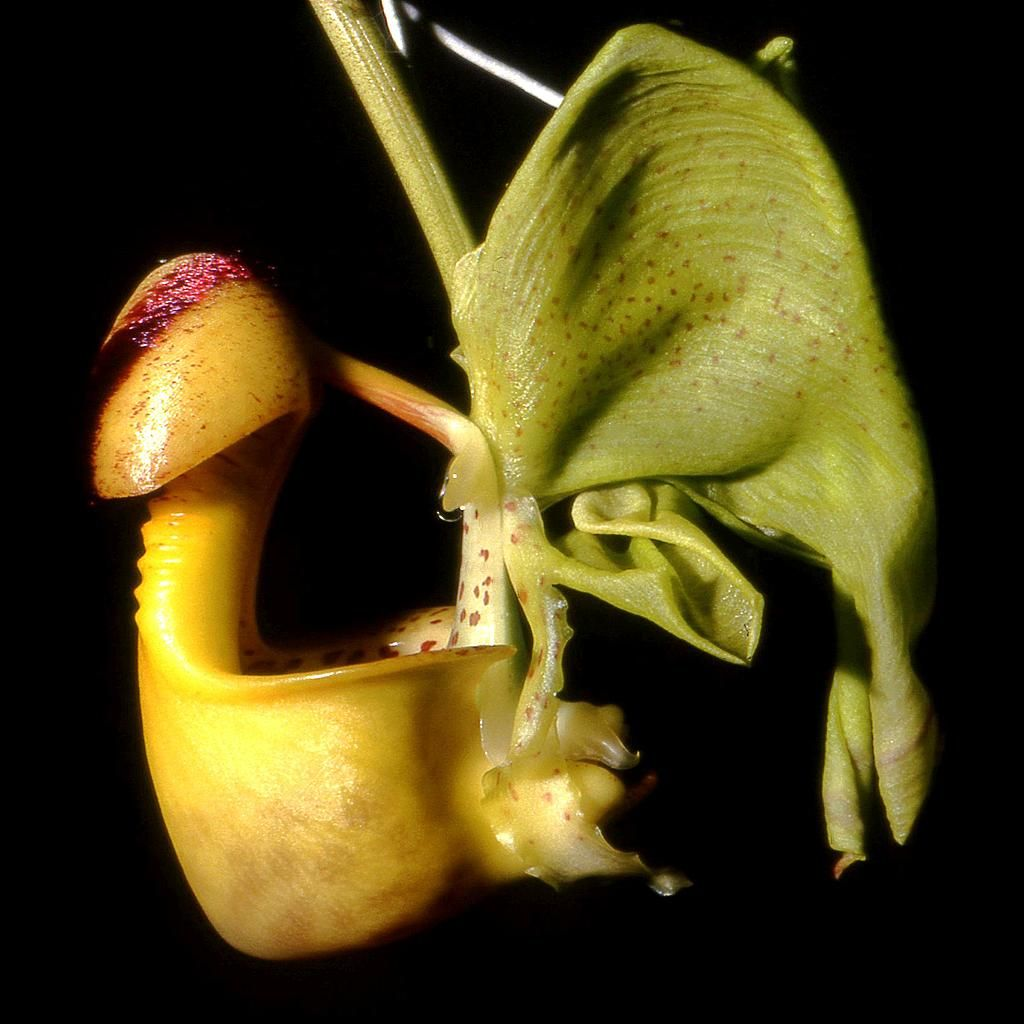
Bucket orchid

Some plants rely on using intoxicating chemicals to produce inebriated bees, and use this inebriation as part of their reproductive strategy. One plant that may do this is the South American bucket orchid (Coryanthes sp.), an epiphyte. The bucket orchid attracts male euglossine bees with its scent, derived from a variety of aromatic compounds. The bees store these compounds in specialized spongy pouches inside their swollen hind legs, as they appear to use the scent (or derivatives thereof) in order to attract females. The flower is constructed in such a way as to make the surface almost impossible to cling to, with smooth, downward-pointing hairs; the bees commonly slip and fall into the fluid in the bucket, and the only navigable route out is a narrow, constricting passage that either glues a "pollinium" (a pollen sack) on their body (if the flower has not yet been visited) or removes any pollinium that is there (if the flower has already been visited). The passageway constricts after a bee has entered, and holds it there for a few minutes, allowing the glue to dry and securing the pollinium. It has been suggested that this process may involve inebriation of the bees.

Van der Pijl and Dodson (1966) observed that bees of the genera Eulaema and Xylocopa exhibit symptoms of inebriation after consuming nectar from the orchids Sobralia violacea and Sobralia rosea.

== Toxic honey ==
A number of plants produce alkaloids which can taint honey made from their flowers in different ways. The plant genus Coriaria produces poisonous honey, due to the toxin tutin. Morphine-containing honey has been reported in areas where opium poppy cultivation is widespread. Tecoma stans is a nontoxic plant, but honey from its flowers is poisonous. Plants including Rhododendron and heathers (Ericaceae) produce the neurotoxin grayanotoxin. This is toxic to humans but not to bees. Honey from these flowers can be psychoactive, or even toxic to humans. Honey can ferment and produce ethanol. Animals, such as birds, that have eaten honey fermented in the sun can be found intoxicated.

== See also ==
- Colony collapse disorder
- Honey bee starvation
- Pesticide toxicity to bees
- Diseases of the honey bee
- Pollinator decline
- List of honey plants
