= Beekeeping in Australia =

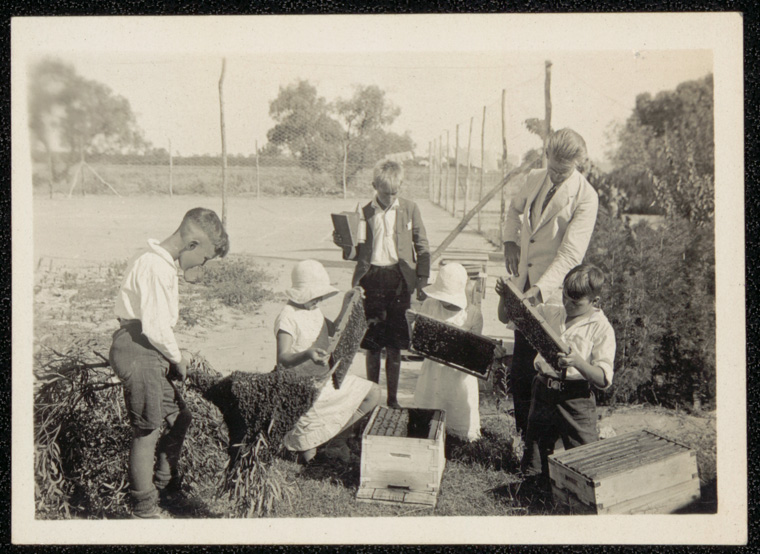
Beekeeping at Curlwaa Public School, c. 1940

Beekeeping in Australia is a commercial industry with around 25,000 registered beekeepers owning over 670,000 hives in 2018. Most are found in the eastern states of Queensland, New South Wales, Victoria and Tasmania as well as the south-west of Western Australia.

Beekeepers or apiarists, and their bees, produce honey, beeswax, package bees, queen bee pollen and royal jelly. They also provide pollination services for fruit trees and a variety of ground crops. These pollination services to agriculture are valued at between A$8–19 billion a year. The approximately 30,000 tonnes (66 million pounds) of honey produced each year is worth around $90 million.

Australia is the fourth largest honey exporting nation after China, Argentina and Mexico. The high quality and unique flavours of Australian honey allows exporters to charge a premium price.

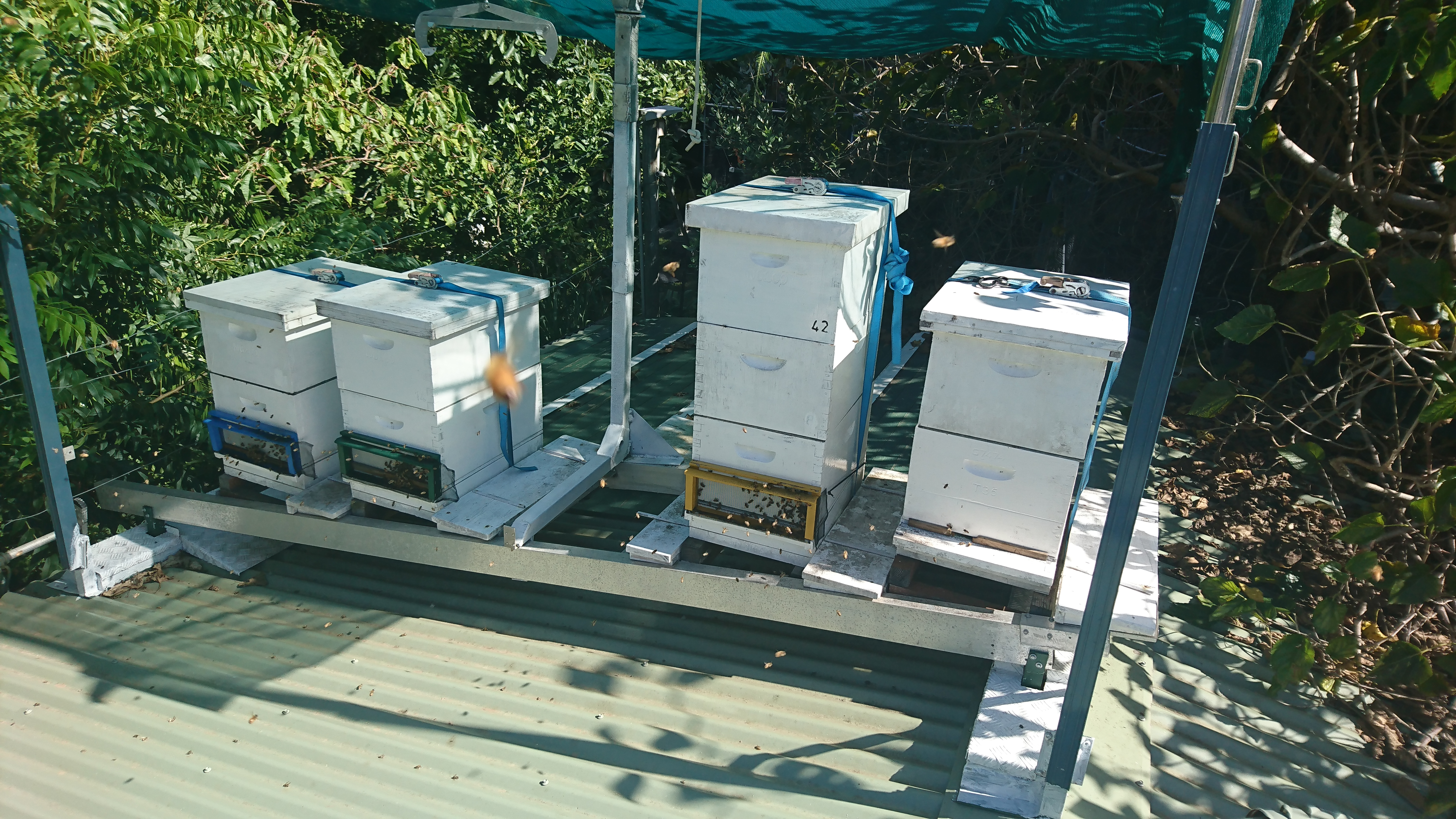
Urban bee hives, Avalon Beach NSW

There are also beekeeping hobbyists in Australia who produce honey for home consumption or to be made into products, such as mead. A few are involved in domesticating native bees.

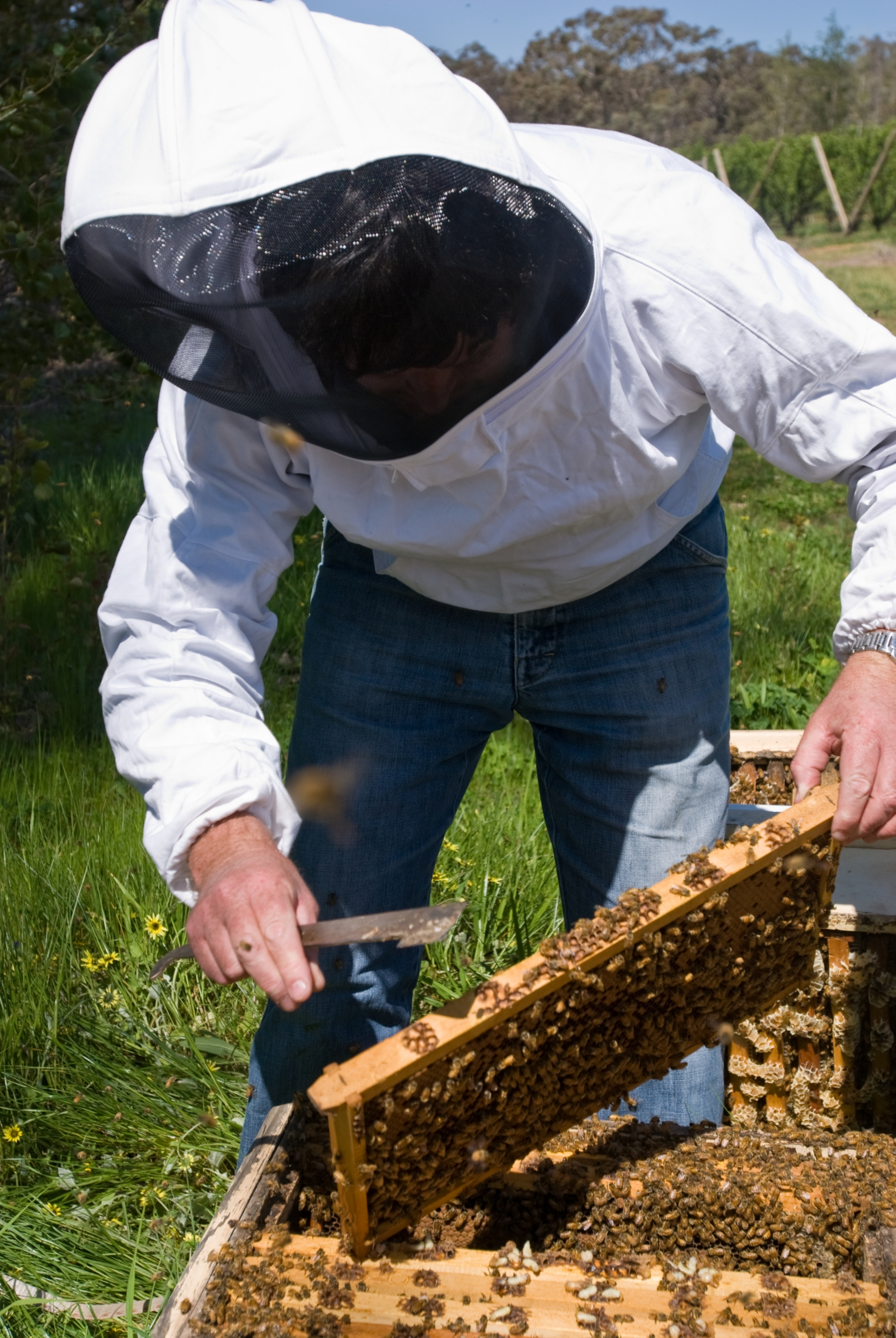
Scientist examining bees near Young, New South Wales

Each of the states and the territories have the responsibility to guide and police the beekeeping industry (including amateur beekeepers) within their own borders. However, the Federal Government has overall jurisdiction over biosecurity and it uses this power to enforce by law some beekeeping requirements under the Biosecurity Code of Practice.

== Pre-1788 ==
Aboriginal Australians have consumed honey from native bees, such as the sugarbag bee, since before European settlement. There are 1,600 described species of native bees in Australia. Some fifteen of these are social species while the others are solitary bees that live alone. Most native bees are either stingless or their stings are not generally dangerous to humans. However, native bees generally don't produce large amounts of honey.

== Introduction of European bees ==
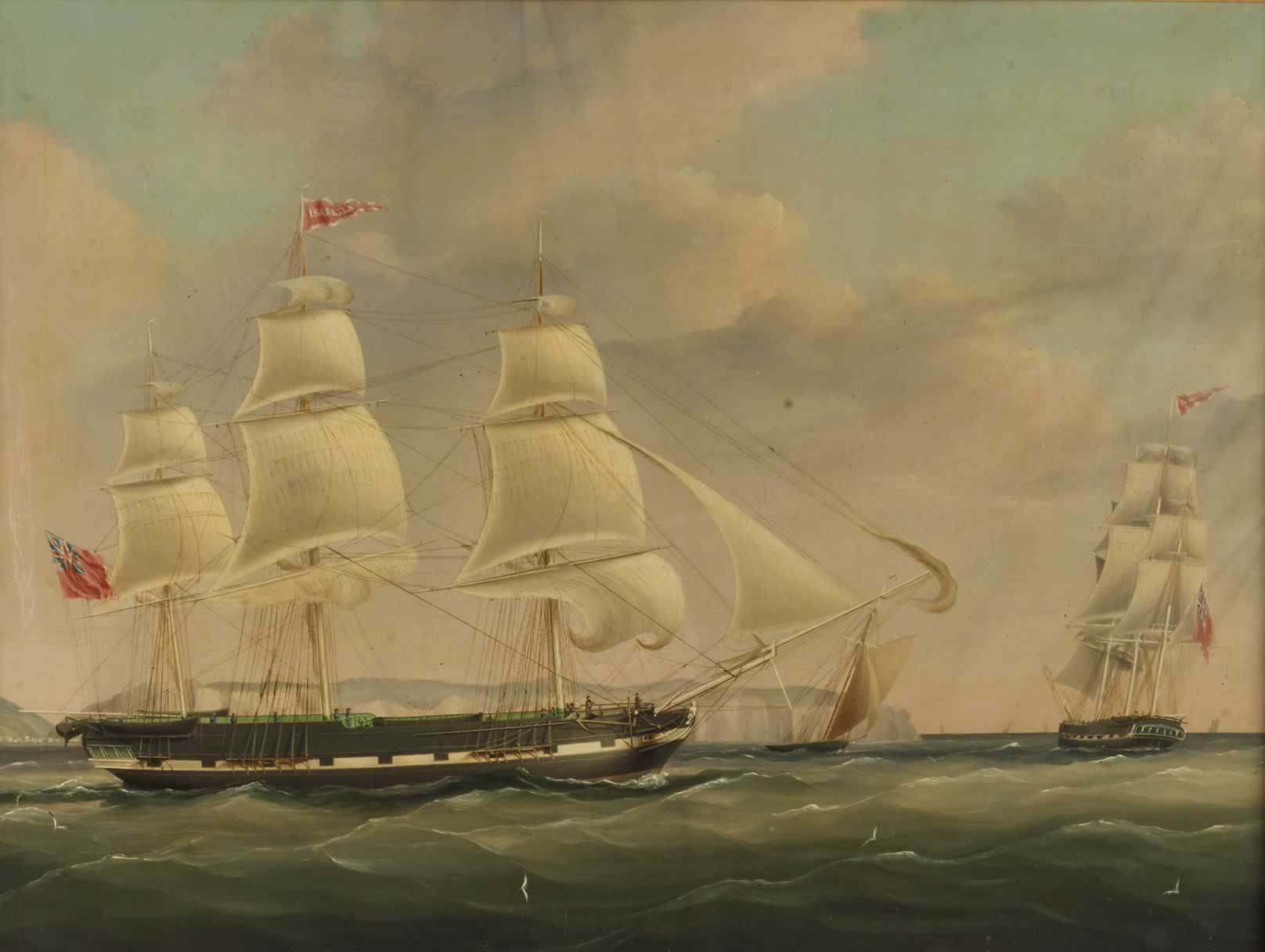
The ship Isabella at sea

The first imported honey bees to be successfully acclimatized in Australia were brought in seven hives aboard the convict transport ship Isabella that reached Sydney in March 1822. The first honey bees brought to Tasmania came with surgeon-superintendent Thomas Braidwood Wilson on the convict transport John that reached Hobart on 28 January 1831.

Later, other species were introduced from Italy, Yugoslavia, and North America. The milder climate in Australia means less honey has to be left in the hive to feed the bees through winter compared to Europe and North America.

== Bee-farming develops ==
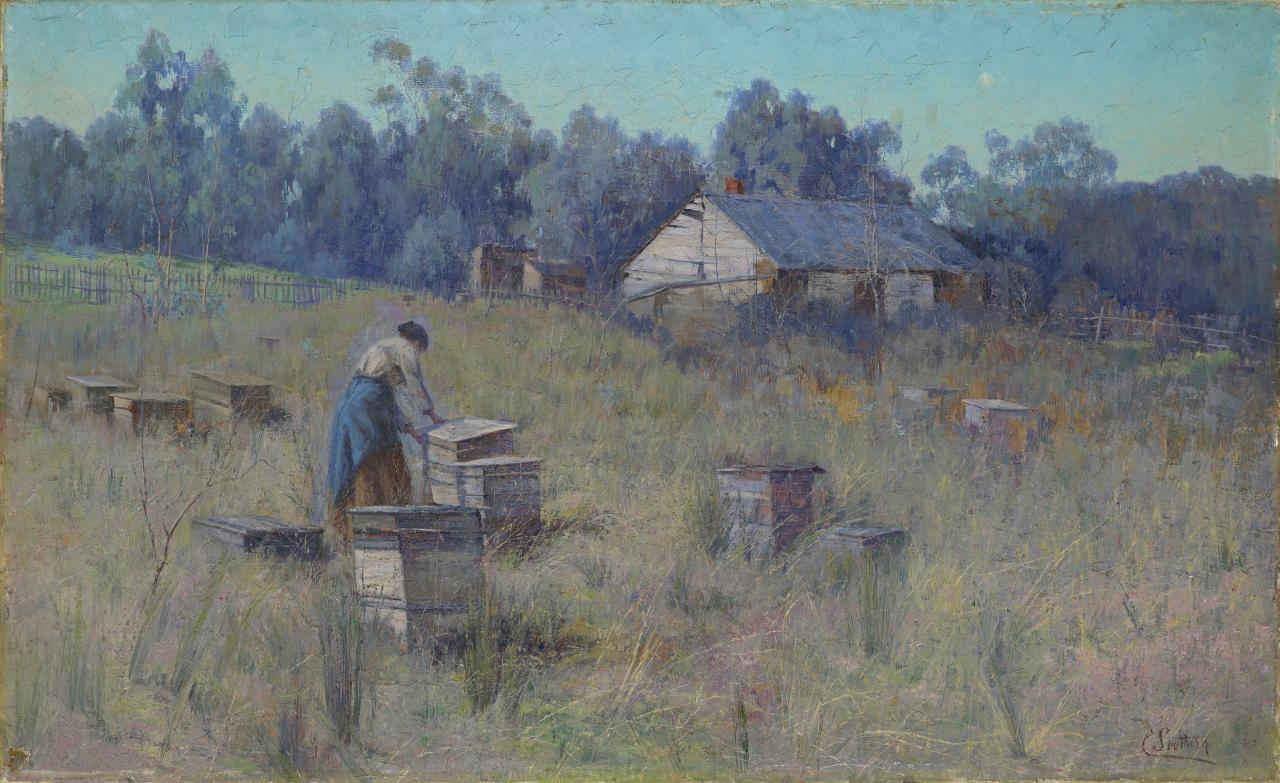
Clara Southern, “An old bee farm,” c. 1900, Warrandyte, Victoria (National Gallery of Victoria)

=== 19th-century ===
Australian farmers wishing to diversify and develop additional sources of income in the nineteenth century sometimes turned to bee-keeping as a side-line. A row of gin cases on a rural property was a sign that bee-farming was in progress as they were frequently reused as bee hives. Bee-keeping remained largely a part-time activity for farmers and people living on the outskirts of towns and cities until dedicated full-time beekeepers began to emerge.

The export of honey may have started in 1845 when an experimental shipment of honey and honeycomb was shipped from New South Wales to Britain in wooden casks. In 1895, 92.7 tonnes (204,435 lb) of honey was exported from Victoria alone. Some 90% of that went to the United Kingdom.

The British author Anthony Trollope (1815–1882) visited Australia in 1871 and commented on the popularity of honey as a favourite food.

The wild bee of the country is not nearly so common as the much more generous and busier bee from Europe,– with which the bush many miles from the coast is already so plentifully filled that honey is a customary delicacy with all the settlers.

The Langstroth hive was in use by 1872. It led to greater honey production and less disease in hives. The smoker developed by Moses Quinby to pacify bees was known by at least 1895.

The South Australian Beekeepers Society was established in 1884 and a beekeeper’s association was active in Victoria in the same year. The Queensland Beekeeper’s Association was meeting by 1886. The Victorian Apiarists Association started in 1900.

=== 20th-century ===
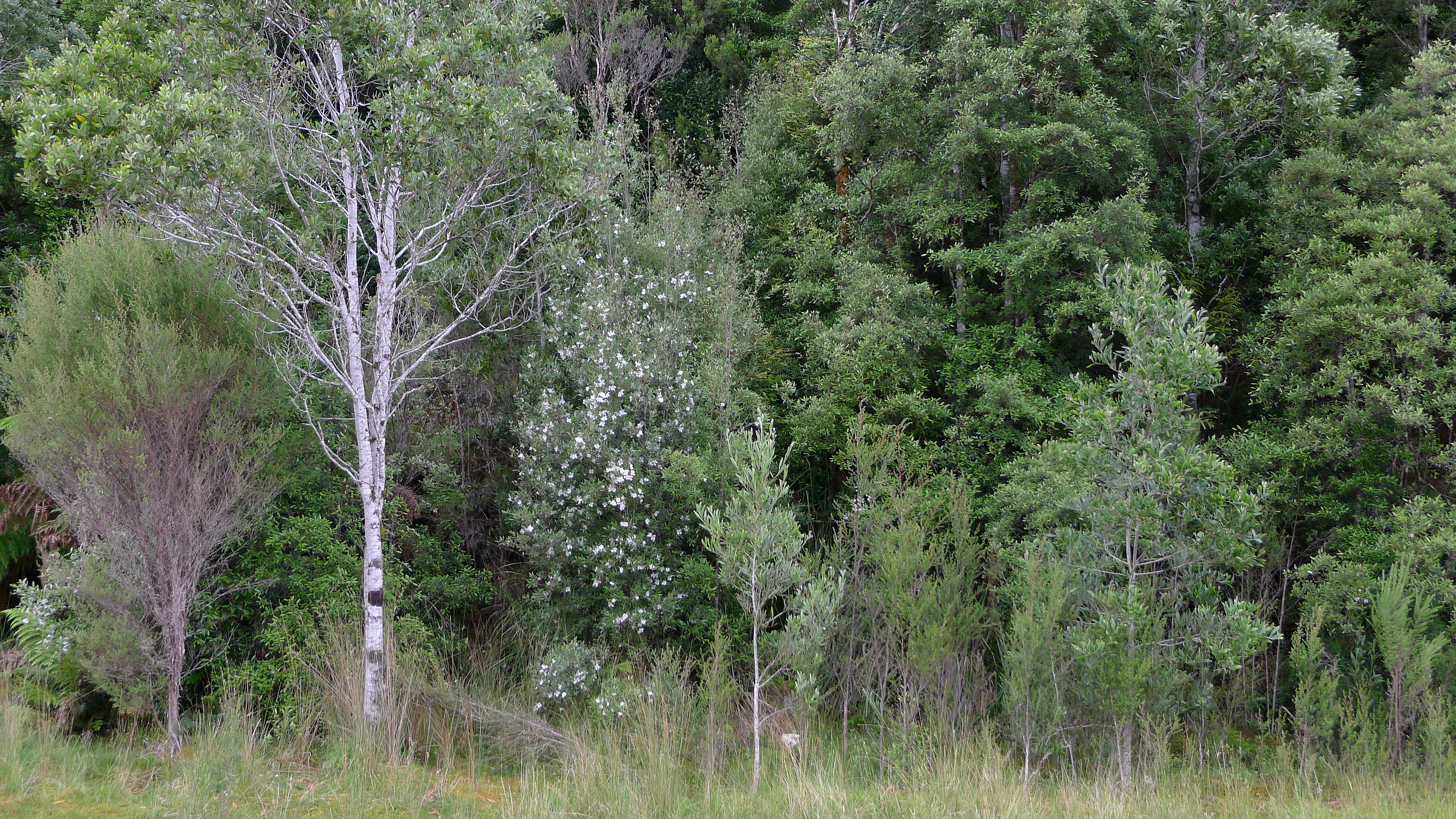
Tasmanian leatherwood (Eucryphia Lucida) trees provide a popular type of Australian honey

In February 1903, Victorian bee-farmer Thomas Bolton (1863–1928) questioned the wisdom of clearing the forest in the Dunkeld area of the Western District. He said the blossom from the trees was annually converted by bees into honey worth £150 per 260 hectares (1 square mile) of forest. The land was being cleared to create grazing pastures for sheep which he claimed annually returned just £80 per 260 hectares (1 square mile). Bolton sent a test shipment of honey to China early in the 20th century. He reported, “The ships company thought so highly of his honey that empty cases were they only part of the consignment left when the ship reached port.”

In 1921–22, Australia produced 3,343.3 tonnes (7,370,790 lb) of honey. Honey exports that year were worth £A 84,417. Beeswax was also exported.

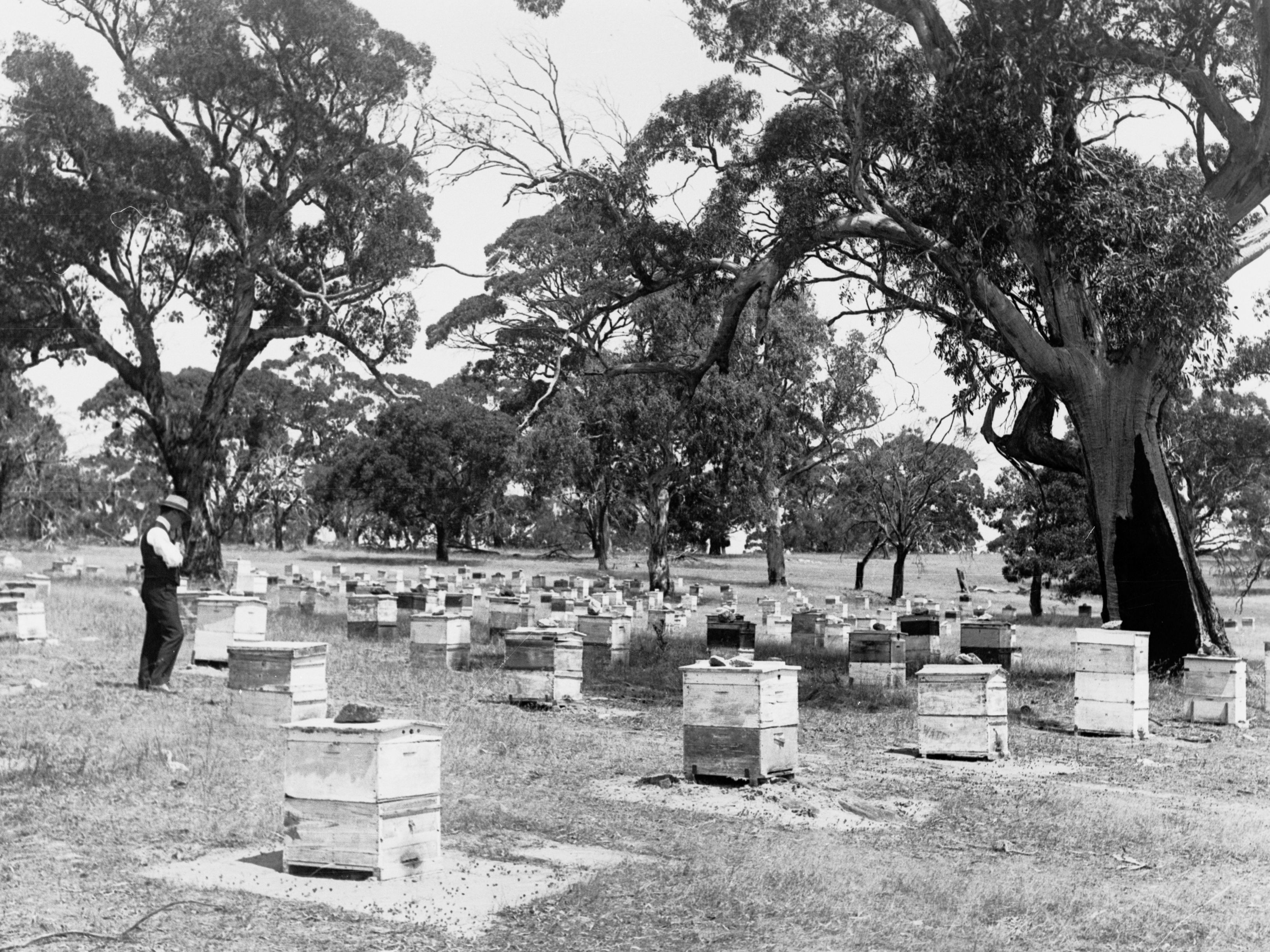
Beefarm, South Australia (c.1925)

Drawbacks to beekeeping in Australia include bushfires, frequent droughts and the tendency for beeswax to melt in very hot conditions. The distance from export markets is another issue. So too is the use of pesticides in agriculture.

The production of honey and bees-wax fluctuates greatly and is determined by the flow of nectar from flora, particularly from the eucalypts, which varies from year to year. Production in 1948–49 was 24,131.1 tonnes (53.2 million pounds), a record high. The average returns from productive hives in 1958–59 was 47 kilograms (103 lb) of honey per hive and the average quantity of wax was 590 grams (1.3 lb) per productive hive. Australia had 451,000 hives in 1958–59 of which 315,000 were regarded as productive. Total production during that period from all hives was 14,735.9 tonnes (32.487 million pounds) with a gross value of £1,803,000. The amount of bees wax produced in 1958–59 was 189.1 tonnes (417 thousand pounds) worth £105,000.

Victoria has long been one of the main honey producing states. In 1971, there were 1,278 registered beekeepers in the state with 103,454 hives that produced 4,447.0 tonnes (9.804 million pounds) of honey worth $984,000, plus 54.4 tonnes (120 thousand pounds) of beeswax valued at $68,000.

=== 21st-century ===
About 70% of Australian honey comes from nectar from native plants. Demand for pollination services for almonds and other crops is growing. Bee-brokers co-ordinate bee-keepers to provide pollination services for such crops.

The species most commonly used for beekeeping in Australia is the western honey bee (Apis mellifera). Most commercial beekeepers have between 400 and 800 hives, but some large operators have up to 10,000.

The Australian Manuka Honey Association (AMHA), has established a set of standards for authentic Australian Manuka honey. Honey that carries the AMHA’s Mark of Authenticity must be pure, natural Manuka honey, produced entirely in Australia, and be tested by an independent, approved laboratory to ensure it meets minimum standards of naturally occurring methylglyoxal (MGO), dihydroxyacetone (DHA), and leptosperin.

Australia produces 25,000 to 30,000 tonnes (55 to 66 million pounds) of honey annually. Some is monofloral honey from a single flowering species while other honey is produced from multiple types of flowering plants. Popular types of honey include leatherwood, blue gum, yellow box and karri, each named after the trees that produce the pollen and nectar gathered by the bees. The purity, taste and variety of Australian honey makes it popular in Asia and elsewhere.

The locally invented flow hive for hobbyist and small scale beekeepers was launched in 2015.

The stingless native bee species Tetragonula carbonaria, Tetragonula hockingsi and Austroplebeia have been domesticated on a small scale for their honey.

Bushfires in the summer of 2019–20 caused massive losses of commercial honey bees, feral bees, native bees and other nectar-loving insects. Together they normally contribute about $14 billion to the Australian economy via the pollination of agricultural and broad-acre crops. Canola and almonds are particularly dependant on honey bees. The fires also devastated some of the best nectar producing forests where bees forage. The reduced honey bee population is expected to take between three and twenty years to recover.

Beekeeping is generally allowed in national parks as long as the practice existed prior to the land becoming a national park, provided that it clearly benefits the conservation of nature and is compatible with the needs of other park users. Beekeepers must also be registered under the Biosecurity Act 2015 to conduct beekeeping in a park.

Active stacked beehive boxes at Kiwarrak National Park, New South Wales

The Australian honeybee industry biosecurity code of practice also requires all beekeepers to inspect their hives at least twice a year and to keep accurate records. Hives must be inspected for the presence of pests and diseases and for hive strength, the inspection to include at least three full-depth brood frames in each hive.

== Diseases and parasites ==
=== Foul brood ===
In New South Wales in 1889 The Sydney Mail and New South Wales Advertiser uses a leaflet from the Beekeepers' Association of South Australia to outline how to recognise American foul brood (caused by Bacillus alvei) in a hive and how to treat it. In South Australia, by 1891 an article in the South Australian Chronicle indicates that there was already an act in that state to attempt to control the spread of American foul brood.

=== Small hive beetle ===
The small hive beetle was detected in Australia by 2003.

=== Varroa mite ===
The Varroa destructor mite is a parasite that has caused significant deaths of colonies throughout the world, forcing beekeepers to treat their hives to keep the mites and their associated virus in check. In June of 2022 the parasite was detected near the port of Newcastle, authorities are attempting to contain and eradicate the mite. However containment efforts appear to be failing, in part due to beekeepers moving their hives from the "red eradication zone" to the "surveillance, or purple zone". It is now believed that the port of Newcastle was not the point of entry, and that varroa had been in the country before detection. To date (the end of 2022) 103 hives have been detected with infestation, with over 17,000 being destroyed including 250 colonies at the world class bee research facility at Tocal Agricultural College, however 48 high value queen bees from Plan Bee, the National Honey Bee Genetic Improvement Program, were able to be securely removed and re-homed. In light of the large numbers of hives being destroyed with over 99% of them being varroa free, resulting in the destruction of hobbies, businesses and breeding projects, opposition is beginning to be voiced against the government policy of eradication, with calls for management of varroa instead, like elsewhere in the world. A petition supporting this alternative policy has amassed nearly 25,000 signatures.

New South Wales is by far the largest beekeeping state. Since the arrival of the varroa mite in 2022 it has lost 35% of the commercial beekeepers in the state.

== Noted beekeepers ==
- Minard Crommelin
- Robert Ellery
- Alex Griffiths
- Ronald Hamlyn-Harris
- Ernest Hannaford
- George Hannaford
- Harold Lindsay
- Tarlton Rayment
- Thomas Wilson

== See also ==
- Beekeeping in New Zealand
- Centre for Integrative Bee Research
- Eucalyptus honey

== Other published sources ==
- Bolton, Professor H.C., "Thomas Bolton: A pioneer bee-keeper in Victoria," The Victorian Historical Journal, Vol 47 (4) November 1976, 295-305
- Beekeeping in Victoria (1981), Melbourne, Victorian Department of Agriculture, 139p
- Honey flora of Victoria (1973), Melbourne, Victorian Department of Agriculture, 148p
- Klumpp, John, (2007), Australian stingless bees: A guide to Sugarbag Beekeeping, Earthing Enterprises. ISBN 9780975713815
- Owen, Robert (2015), The Australian beekeeping manual, Exisle Publishing, Wollombi (NSW). ISBN 9781921966880
- Rayment, Rayment (1914) [First published 1914]. Money in bees in Australasia: A practical treatise on the profitable management of the honey bee in Australasia, and a Special Section Dealing with the Nectariferous Value of Indigenous Flora (1st ed.). Whitcombe and Tombs Ltd. pp. 1–293. OCLC 762734838.
- Clemson, Alan (1985). Honey and Pollen Flora. Melbourne: Inaka Press. ISBN 0-909605-33-5.
