= Leptosin =

Names
- IUPAC name (2Z)-2-[(3,4-dihydroxyphenyl)methylidene]-7-methoxy-6-[(2S,3R,4S,5S,6R)-3,4,5-trihydroxy-6-(hydroxymethyl)oxan-2-yl]oxy-1-benzofuran-3-one

Identifiers
CAS Number	486-23-7
3D model (JSmol)	Interactive image
ChEBI	CHEBI:191619
ChEMBL	ChEMBL3797767
ChemSpider	4950172
PubChem CID	6446647
UNII	2T797KJ9NH
- InChI: InChI=1S/C22H22O11/c1-30-21-13(32-22-19(29)18(28)17(27)15(8-23)33-22)5-3-10-16(26)14(31-20(10)21)7-9-2-4-11(24)12(25)6-9/h2-7,15,17-19,22-25,27-29H,8H2,1H3/b14-7-/t15-,17-,18+,19-,22-/m1/s1 Key: NXOKVARAWXQHGX-JPNDPKSOSA-N
- SMILES: COC1=C(C=CC2=C1O/C(=C\C3=CC(=C(C=C3)O)O)/C2=O)O[C@H]4[C@@H]([C@H]([C@@H]([C@H](O4)CO)O)O)O

Properties
Chemical formula	C_{22}H_{22}O_{11}
Molar mass	462.407 g·mol^{−1}
- Except where otherwise noted, data are given for materials in their standard state (at 25 °C [77 °F], 100 kPa). Infobox references

Leptosin is an aurone glycoside first reported from the leaves of Flemingia strobilifera, commonly known as kusrunt. Leptosin has also been found in Coreopsis species, including Coreopsis lanceolata and Coreopsis grandiflora. Another accepted name for this chemical is leptosidin 7-O-β-D-glucopyranoside. Leptosperin was originally called Leptosin before being renamed to the name it has now.

== Research ==
In a 2021 study, Leptosin was isolated from Coreopsis lanceolata flowers and was found to have antioxidant activity. Leptosin was then tested in zebrafish and the results suggested that the chemical may have potential in diabetes-related research.
