= Honey bee starvation =

Inadequate nutrition in honey bees

Honey bee starvation is a state where honey bees experience shortage of food, i.e. honey due to various circumstances. Starvation may be caused by unfavorable weather, disease, long distance transportation or depleting food reserve. Over-harvesting of honey in commercial bee hives (and the lack of supplemental feeding) is the foremost cause for scarcity as bees are not left with enough of a honey store, though weather, disease, and disturbance can also cause problems. Backyard beekeepers typically face more colony losses in the winter than in the summer, but for commercial beekeepers there is not much variation in loss by season. Starvation may be avoided by effective monitoring of hives and disease prevention measures. Starvation can also amplify the toxic effect of pesticide bees are exposed to.

== Background ==
Backyard beekeepers produce 40% of all honey worldwide. Beehive management issues resulting in colony losses are a major concern for backyard beekeepers. According to a 2014–15 national survey, backyard beekeepers lost 52% and commercial beekeepers lost 32% of colonies. Backyard beekeepers face more colony losses in the winter than in the summer, but for commercial beekeepers there is not much variation in loss by season. Roughly 22% of backyard beekeepers have identified starvation as one of the main causes for colony losses. Honey bee starvation is an especially challenging problem for beginning beekeepers. Starvation may be caused by unfavorable weather, disease, long distance transportation or depleting food reserve. Starvation may be avoided by effective monitoring of hives and disease prevention measures.

== Causes ==
=== Food scarcity ===
Over-harvesting of honey (and the lack of supplemental feeding) is the foremost cause for scarcity. Bees are not left with enough of a honey store. Weather changes and extremes, available food reserve and presence of brood are factors that influence the speed at which food stores deplete. It could just take a day or two of food scarcity to kill an entire hive.

=== Weather ===
In the winter, honey bees cluster around the queen and brood to keep them warm. It is believed that an outer layer of bees called mantle bees keep the cluster packed and warm. Also an inner layer of worker bees move around and shiver to produce warmth. Even if food is available in a far corner of the hive or in another frame, it may be too cold for the bees to leave the cluster to reach the food. This leads to starvation and death.

Early spring can be misleading in terms of knowing honey level in hive. A couple of cold nights in spring can prevent the bees from foraging and beekeepers may not realise if the bees have been able to store enough to get through those days. Throughout spring, colonies are likely to become densely populated.

In summer, an amount of honey is necessary for the big population of bees. Rainy days can wash out nectar and pollen from flowers and hungry bees may run out of food.

In the fall, sudden drops in temperature are the major reasons for starvation.

=== Diseases ===
Diseases like Nosema ceranae impact the digestive tract of the bees. This could lead to starvation even in the presence of food sources.

=== Transportation ===
Millions of bees are transported each year to California and other parts of the USA to pollinate crops such as almonds. Bee hives are transported cross-country in trucks nonstop or with little break. Bees are severely stressed from confinement, heat, weather changes and sudden change in their daily tasks. While on the road for two to three days, it is difficult for the truck driver or the beekeeper to check on the temperature and food level in the hives. Proper nutrition of the bees is affected and there is high risk of bees starving to death on the road trip. One study points to impaired food gland development in migratory bees resulting in improper feeding of brood. North Carolina State University news states that providing bees access to huge amount of food while on road may ease stress due to transportation.

Migratory bees are usually released in a very large farm for a few weeks to pollinate a single crop. Long term diet of one type of nectar makes the bee vulnerable to diseases. Recent studies have shown that the lifespan of migratory bees are less than that of stationary bees.

== Preventive steps ==
=== Feeding bees ===
While harvesting honey, it is essential to leave enough of a store of honey for times when bees are not able to forage. It might still become necessary to feed bees. During feeding, it is important to follow recommendations about what to feed, how to feed and how often.

==== Suitable food for bees ====
Bees can be fed water and sugar syrup in summer and fall. In the winter, syrup would freeze. Therefore, dry sugar is preferred. Harvested honey made by the bees can also be fed back. It is important to make sure honey comes from disease-free bees, although in practice, this is impossible, as every beehive carries some disease.

It is also essential to look at how starved the bees are. If the bees are dying, thin sugar syrup should be directly sprinkled on the bees as they will not be able to fly or process hard candy. In about an hour, this should help save their lives. Further, they can be fed syrup and candy using feeders.

==== Precautions while feeding ====
Hive needs to be ventilated in winter time. Hives may need to be closed to prevent food robbery from outside foragers.

==== Feeding frequency ====
While there are generic weight recommendations available, frequency and amount of food to feed vary for each hive. Depending on the weather conditions, configuration and population in hive, a beekeeper needs to decide how much to feed and when to feed. It is best to seek recommendations from experienced beekeepers in the locality.

=== Hive monitoring ===
It is crucial to monitor food reserve in the hive, temperature and hive activity especially in harsh weather conditions.

==== Manual monitoring ====
Manual inspection is the most common method to date. It is a tedious process for beekeepers and intrusive for bees. It is necessary to monitor regularly to identify any issues with feeding and food banks.

Information is available from beekeeper associations and social media networks. Mobile apps like Bee Safe! can predict and alert how much to feed and when to feed based on weather conditions and hive feed cycles.

==== Electronic monitoring systems ====
Electronic monitoring systems can be an effective tool for the beekeeper to ensure bees do not starve. These monitors gather data about a hive such as temperature, vibrations etc. The downside of existing electronic monitors is the high cost and need for processing vast amounts of data. Reasonable pricing and improvisations to get an alert based on the hive configurations are necessary before backyard keepers can use these monitors efficiently to know when to feed.

== See also ==
- List of Northern American nectar sources for honey bees
