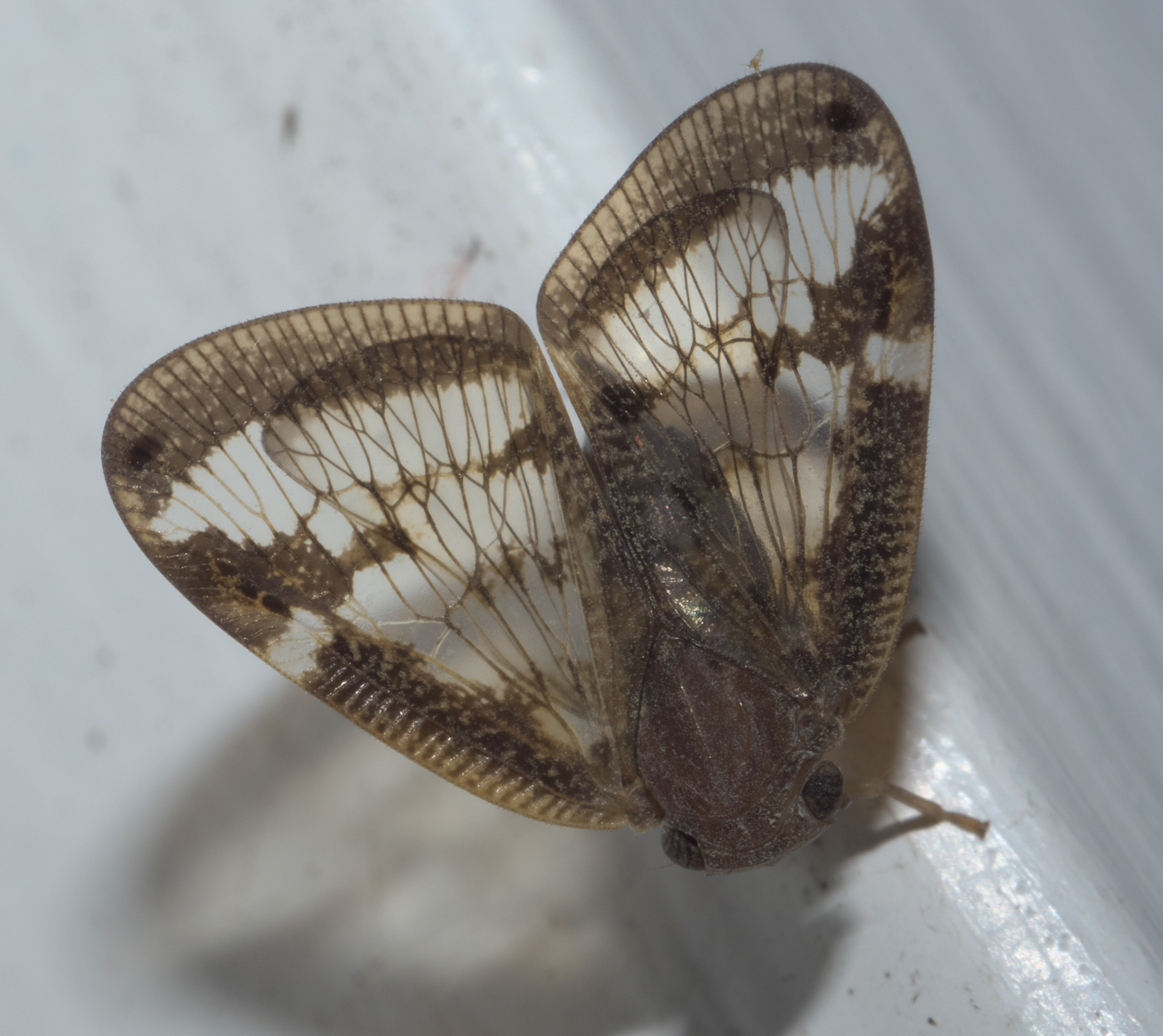
- Scolypopa australis, New Zealand

Scientific classification
- Domain: Eukaryota
- Kingdom: Animalia
- Phylum: Arthropoda
- Class: Insecta
- Order: Hemiptera
- Suborder: Auchenorrhyncha
- Infraorder: Fulgoromorpha
- Family: Ricaniidae
- Genus: Scolypopa; Stål, 1859

= Scolypopa =

Genus of true bugs

Scolypopa is a genus of planthoppers in the family Ricaniidae. There are about eight described species in Scolypopa, found mainly in Australia and New Zealand.

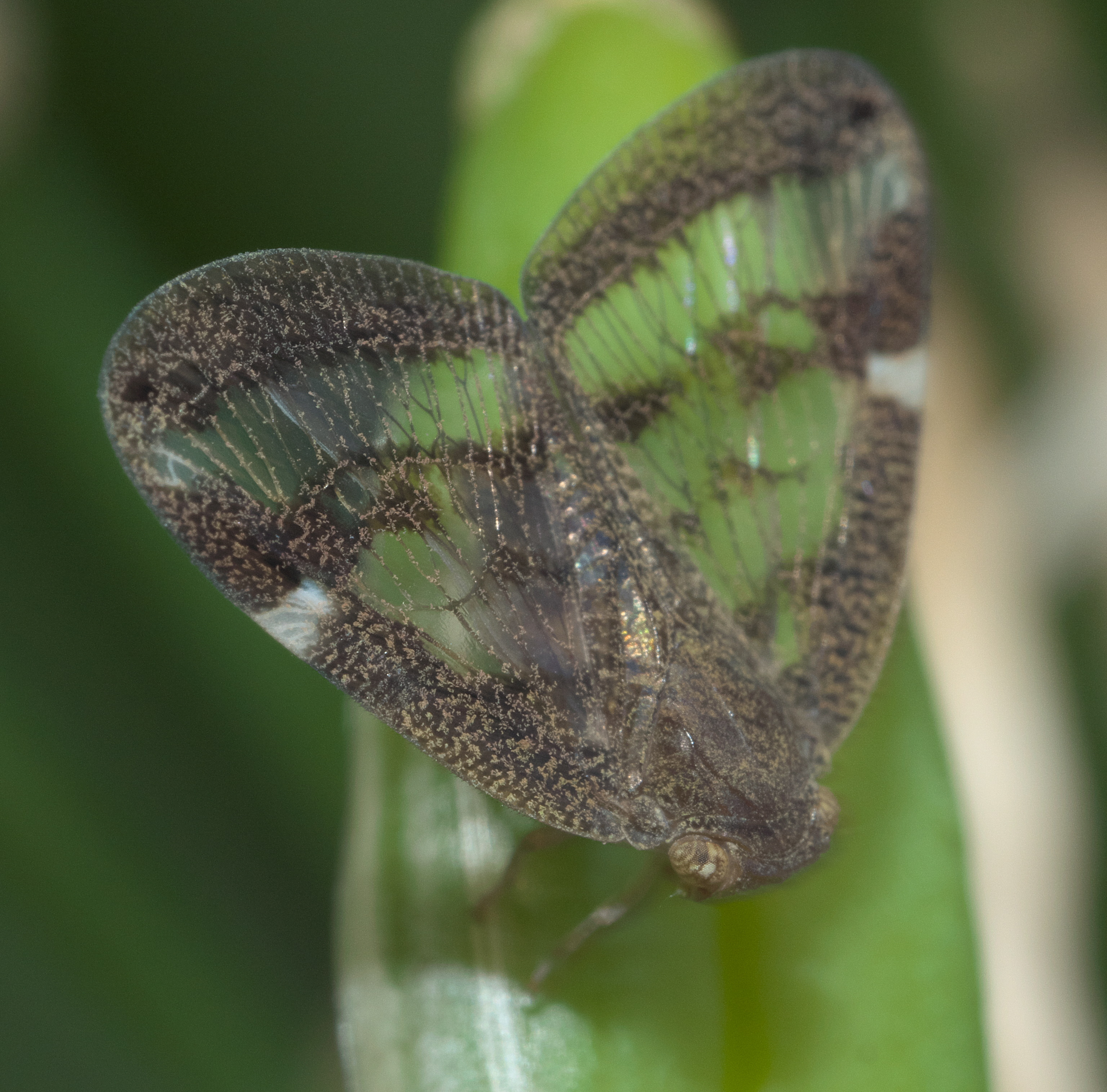
Scolypopa australis

== Species ==
These eight species belong to the genus Scolypopa:

- Scolypopa aeneomicans Haupt, 1926
- Scolypopa aphrophoroides (Walker, 1862)
- Scolypopa australis (Walker, 1851) (passionvine hopper)
- Scolypopa confinis (Distant, 1906)
- Scolypopa delecta (Melichar, 1898)
- Scolypopa kurandae Kirkaldy, 1906
- Scolypopa scutata Stål, 1859
- Scolypopa stipata (Walker, 1851)
