= Pollinators in New Zealand =

Pollinators in New Zealand include bees, syrphid flies, tūī and other birds, and bats, which all contribute to the ecology of New Zealand.

== Bees ==
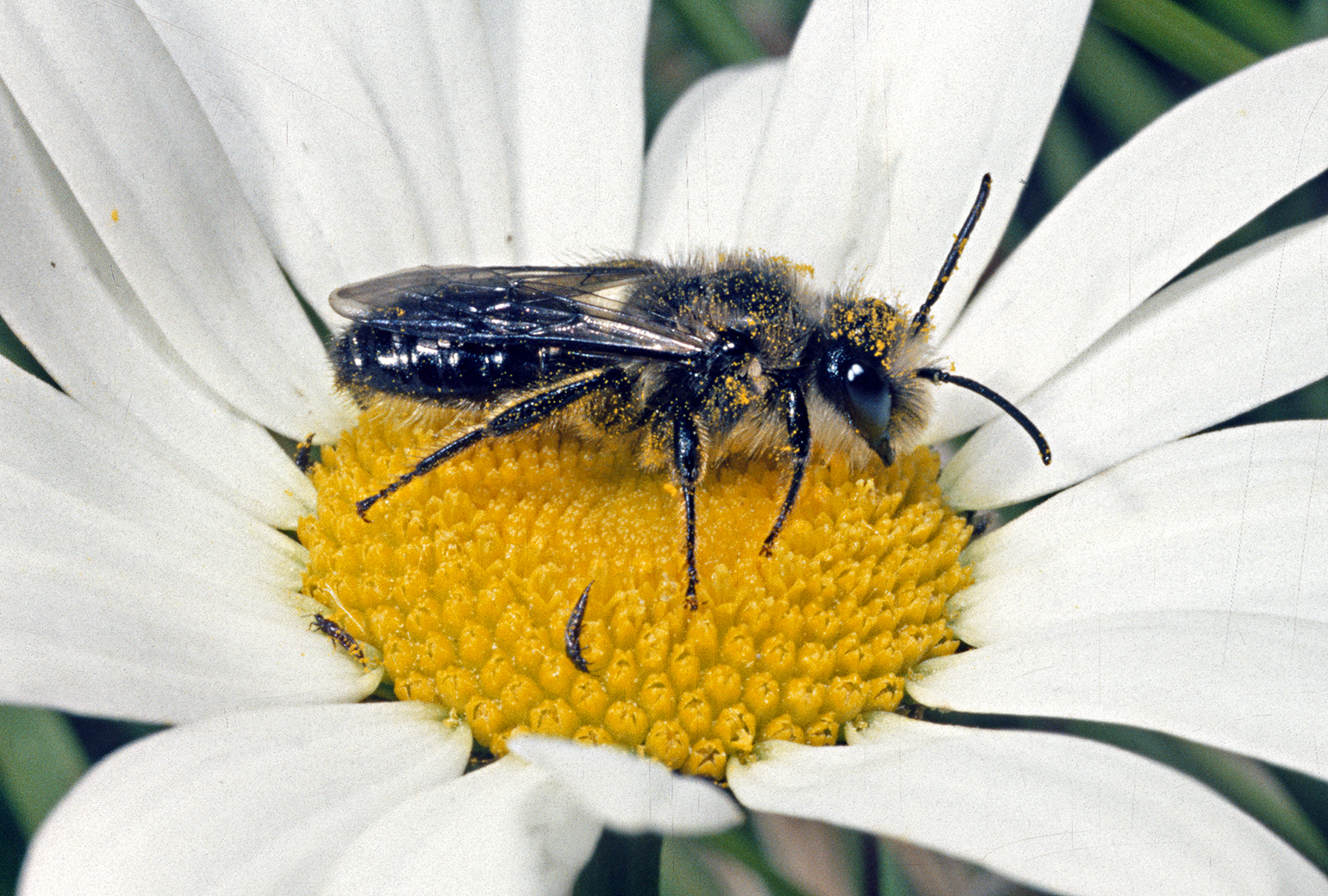
A New Zealand native bee, black rather than yellow in colour

There are a total of 41 bee species in New Zealand, 28 of them native, and 13 non-natives that were introduced over time. Native bees cannot sting, unlike introduced species such as the honeybee. Other key differences include a shorter tongue that evolved to best collect nectar from New Zealand native flowers. Physically they are smaller than species like the honey bee and have less yellow and more dark/black coloration.

== Syrphid flies ==
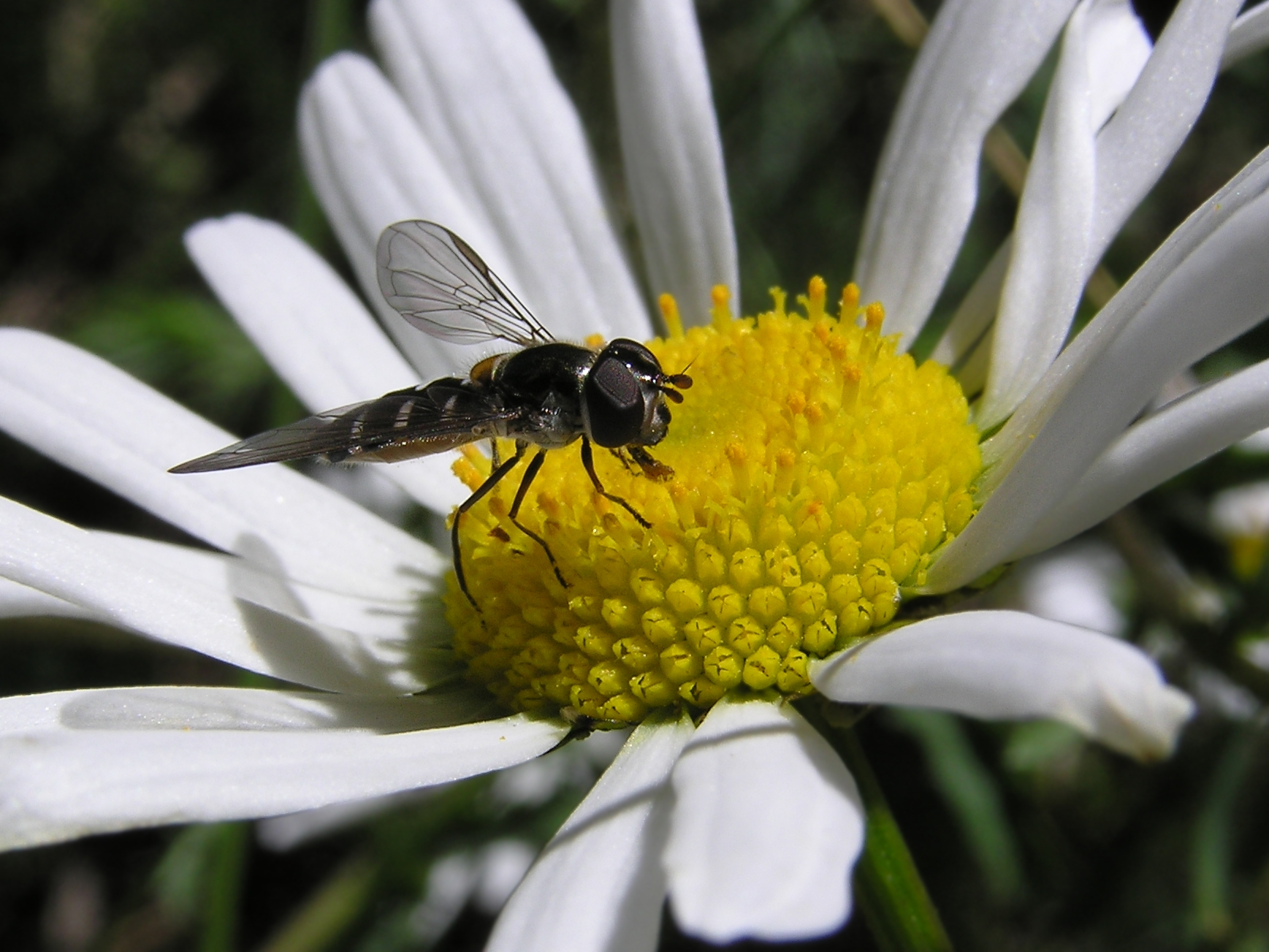
Small striped fly

There are more than 40 species of syrphid flies in New Zealand. As is the case outside of New Zealand, the family is extremely variable, ranging from large, bulky, and hairy to the small, slender, and shiny. These flies are found in a variety of habitats including agricultural fields and alpine zones. Two hoverfly species in Switzerland are being investigated for introduction as biological control agents of hawkweeds in New Zealand.

Syrphid flies, in particular the native species Melanostoma fasciatum and Melangyna novaezelandiae, are common on agricultural fields in New Zealand. Coriander and tansy leaf are known to be particularly attractive to many species of adult hoverflies which feed on large quantities of pollen of these plants. In organic paddocks hoverflies were found to feed on an average of three and a maximum of six different pollen types. M. fasciatum has a short proboscis which restricts it to obtaining nectar from disk flowers.

Syrphid flies are also common visitors to flowers in alpine zones in New Zealand. Native flies (Allograpta and Platycheirus) in alpine zones show preferences for flower species based on their colour in alpine zones; syrphid flies consistently choose yellow flowers over white regardless of species. However, syrphid flies are not as effective pollinators of alpine herb species as native solitary bees.

== Birds ==
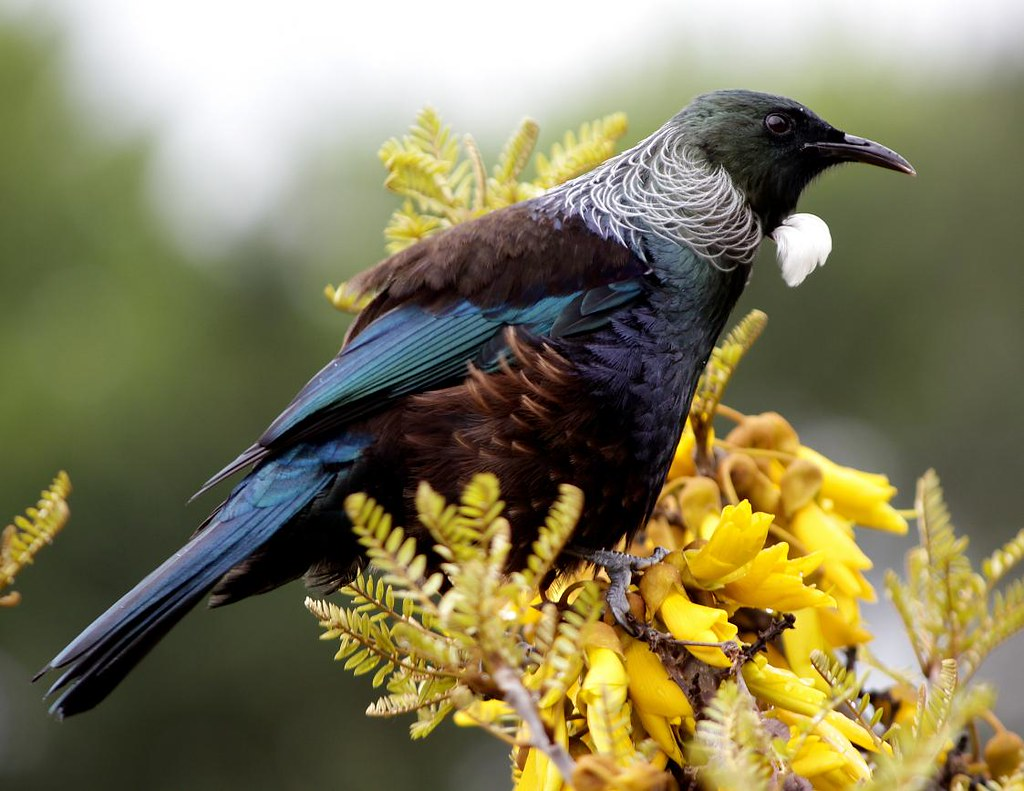
Tūī, New Zealand native bird

A tūī, a New Zealand native bird species, will stick its beak inside a flower to eat the nectar deep within the petals in order to extract vital nutrition they need to survive. Flowers native to New Zealand have evolved alongside these birds in order to best deposit pollen onto them while they extract nectar, usually depositing it on the upper or underside of the beak. The tūī then moves on to another flower and will cross pollinate them completing the cycle in a mutually beneficial relationship.
