= Leptosperin =

Names
- IUPAC name Methyl 3,5-dimethoxy-4-[(2S,3R,4S,5S,6R)-3,4,5-trihydroxy-6-[[(2R,3R,4S,5S,6R)-3,4,5-trihydroxy-6-(hydroxymethyl)oxan-2-yl]oxymethyl]oxan-2-yl]oxybenzoate
- Other names Methyl 4-{[6-O-(β-D-glucopyranosyl)-β-D-glucopyranosyl]oxy}-3,5-dimethoxybenzoate

Identifiers
CAS Number	486-23-7
3D model (JSmol)	Interactive image
ChemSpider	30900649
PubChem CID	102200470
UNII	2T797KJ9NH
- InChI: InChI=1S/C22H32O15/c1-31-9-4-8(20(30)33-3)5-10(32-2)19(9)37-22-18(29)16(27)14(25)12(36-22)7-34-21-17(28)15(26)13(24)11(6-23)35-21/h4-5,11-18,21-29H,6-7H2,1-3H3/t11-,12-,13-,14-,15+,16+,17-,18-,21-,22+/m1/s1 Key: YSIIUTBDRZJOBX-GISOMYDASA-N
- SMILES: COc1cc(cc(c1O[C@H]2[C@@H]([C@H]([C@@H]([C@H](O2)CO[C@H]3[C@@H]([C@H]([C@@H]([C@H](O3)CO)O)O)O)O)O)O)OC)C(=O)OC

Properties
Chemical formula	C_{22}H_{32}O_{15}
Molar mass	536.483 g·mol^{−1}
- Except where otherwise noted, data are given for materials in their standard state (at 25 °C [77 °F], 100 kPa). Infobox references

Leptosperin (originally but no longer "leptosin") is a bioactive component of mānuka honey. It is the gentiobiose glycoside of syringic acid methyl ester. It is named for the genus Leptospermum, the shrubs from which bees harvest nectar to make this type of honey. This bioactive component is the source of antibacterial property of mānuka honey or other Leptospermum species derived honey.

Due to leptosperin being present in mānuka honey but not other honeys, its presence can be used as a marker to confirm the authenticity of claimed mānuka products.
