= Tutin (toxin) =

Chemical compound

Clinical data
- ATC code: none

Identifiers
- IUPAC name: (1S,2R,3S,5R,6R,7R,8S,9R,12R)-2,8-dihydroxy-7-methyl-12-prop-1-en-2-ylspiro[4,10-dioxatetracyclo[7.2.1.02,7.03,5]dodecane-6,2'-oxirane]-11-one
- CAS Number: 2571-22-4
- PubChem CID: 75729
- ChemSpider: 10252021
- UNII: B69P754702
- CompTox Dashboard (EPA): DTXSID30180400
- ECHA InfoCard: 100.236.780

Chemical and physical data
- Formula: C_{15}H_{18}O_{6}
- Molar mass: 294.303 g·mol^{−1}
- 3D model (JSmol): Interactive image
- SMILES: CC(=C)[C@@H]1[C@@H]2[C@H]([C@]3([C@@]4(CO4)[C@H]5[C@@H]([C@]3([C@H]1C(=O)O2)O)O5)C)O
- InChI: InChI=1S/C15H18O6/c1-5(2)6-7-12(17)20-8(6)9(16)13(3)14(4-19-14)10-11(21-10)15(7,13)18/h6-11,16,18H,1,4H2,2-3H3/t6-,7+,8+,9+,10+,11-,13-,14+,15-/m0/s1; Key:CCAZWUJBLXKBAY-ULZPOIKGSA-N

Tutin is a poisonous plant derivative found in New Zealand tutu plants (several species in the genus Coriaria). It acts as a potent antagonist of the glycine receptor, and has powerful convulsant effects. It is used in scientific research into the glycine receptor. It is sometimes associated with outbreaks of toxic honey poisoning when bees feed on honeydew exudate from the sap-sucking passion vine hopper (Scolypopa australis) insect, when the vine hoppers have been feeding on the sap of tutu bushes. Toxic honey is a rare event and is more likely to occur when comb honey is eaten directly from a hive that has been harvesting honeydew from passionvine hoppers feeding on tutu plants.

== History ==
Tutin was first discovered as a honey contaminant in the late 19th century. Missionaries from overseas introduced the western honey bee (Apis mellifera) to New Zealand in 1839. A few decades later, people eating the local honey would suffer from symptoms like vomiting, headaches and confusion. At this point the neurotoxin was studied, and in the early 1900s its toxic effects were fully characterised. The toxin was known to come from the tutu plant. However, neither the nectar nor the pollen of the tutu plant contain this toxin, the two parts the honey bees ingest. Eventually it was found that the passion vine hopper (Scolypopa australis), a pest insect, extracts sap from young shoots of the tutu plant and releases secretions, honeydew, that contain the tutin toxin. Honeybees will consume honeydew as a supplementary food source, thereby contaminating the honey they produce with this toxin. Further outbreaks of tutin poisoning would periodically appear from that point onwards. As late as 2008 a family had to be hospitalized due to severe symptoms caused by homegrown honey with tutin contaminations.

== Structure and chemical properties ==
Tutin is a polyoxygenanted polycyclic sesquiterpene convulsant neurotoxin. Tutin is one of a series of chemically and pharmacologically similar compounds of which picrotoxinin and coriamyrtin have been mostly studied. Conroy proposed the structure for picrotoxinin, which was confirmed by X-ray crystallographic studies and also determined the absolute configuration of the molecule. Karyone and Okuda proposed the tutin structure based on the pictrotoxinin structure and chemical degradation studies. The structure of tutin including absolute stereochemistry was confirmed by X-ray crystal analysis together with chemical and chiroptical means. Tutin has a highly strained skeleton, including two epoxide rings and a lactone, which is susceptible to various rearrangements. Tutin has a characteristic intensely bitter taste. Tutin is very soluble in acetone, but dissolves moderately in chloroform and is insoluble in carbon disulfide or benzene. Addition of strong sulfuric acid to a few drops of a saturated aqueous solution of tutin results in a blood-red coloration.

== Isolation from nature ==
In 1901, tutin was first isolated by Easterfield and Aston and identified as the convulsive poison present in the New Zealand species of Coriaria (‘’tutu’’ or ‘’toitoi’’ in Maori). Easterfield and Aston used 1.5 kilograms of seeds and 11 kilograms of the air-dried Coriaria thymifolia plant (without roots) from Dunedin at the time of flowering in January. The seeds were pulverised and exhausted by carbon disulfide removing a green drying oil. The plant was put through a chaff cutter and boiled with water. The mixture was treated with a large volume of ethanol. The ethanol precipitated inorganic salts, ellagic acid and a large amount of black matter. After distilling, the residue was extracted with diethyl ether. The crystals were recrystallized several times from water, which resulted in separating of the substance in characteristic needle forms and recrystallization from ethanol in oblique ended prisms. The final product contained the characteristic highly poisonous non-nitrogenous glucoside tutin as colourless crystals melting at 204–205 °C (399–401 °F).

== Chemical synthesis of (+)-tutin ==
In 1989, Wakamatsu and coworkers reported in details the first total synthesis of (+)-tutin in a stereocontrolled manner. (+)-Tutin can be synthesized in a nine-step reaction process. First, a (-)-bromo alcohol was protected by silylation. After this step, conversion of the allylic bromide moiety into the allylic alcohol was achieved by the Corey's conditions. Next, the hydroxyl moiety was introduced at C-2, regio- and stereoselectively of the intramolecular reaction was due to the use of the C-14 hydroxyl function to gain the desired cyclic ether. Thereafter, the ethereal bond was cleaved providing the allylic bromide. Subsequently, the silyl protection group was removed by using tetra-n-butylammonium fluoride in THF. The intramolecular S_{N}^{2} reaction at the allylic bromide moiety led to the formation of the epoxy olefin. Then, the epoxy olefin was converted into the bisepoxide in three-steps, first alkaline hydrolysis to give the alcohol, second esterification to form 2,2,2-trichloroethyl carbonate and as last epoxidation. Thereafter, the bisepoxide was oxidized with ruthenium(VII)oxide affording 2,2,2-trichloroethoxycarbonyl α-bromotutin. The final part of the synthesis of (+)-tutin is a reduction with zinc and ammoniumchloride.

== Chemical reactions ==
Acylation of the secondary alcohol 2-OH and double acetylation at both the 2-OH and C6-OH of tutin has been reported. In the New Zealand toxin honey two main structures of tutin conjugates were found; 2-(β-D-glucopyranosyl)-tutin and 2-[6’-(α-D-glucopyranosyl)-β-D-glucopyranosyl]-Tutin. Chemical synthesis of 2-(β-D-glucopyranosyl)-tutin could be achieved via the β-O-glycosylation reaction between tutin and an activated sugar donor. Multiple methods of O-glycosylation have been published about the synthesis of complex glycosides with anomeric β-stereoselectivity.

== Mechanism of action ==
GABA (γ-aminobutyric acid) is a major inhibitory neurotransmitter in the central nervous system of mammals. Tutin is an antagonist of the GABA receptors. By inhibiting these receptors, the sedative effect of this neurotransmitter is lessened, leading to intensive stimulation of the nervous system. Based on extensive data, tutin was determined to be a non-competitive antagonist using an allosteric mechanism.

Apart from GABA receptor inhibition, in vitro studies have also shown tutin to have an inhibitory effect on the glycine receptors of the neurons in the spinal cord. These receptors have inhibitory functions comparable to those of the GABA receptors.

Lastly, investigation into similar toxins has shown them to be blockers for other ligand-gated ion channels. Therefore, it is suspected that tutin could also possess antagonistic properties against other ion channels.

== Metabolism ==
Laboratory animal studies on the absorption, distribution, metabolism and excretion of tutin are not available. According to Fitchett and Malcolm 1909, McNaughton and Goodwin 2008, the systemic absorption of purified tutin after an oral ingestion appears rapid in animals as clinical signs that are consistent with neurotoxicity were found to appear within less than 15 minutes in mice and after about one hour in dogs. Animals that received non-lethal doses showed a rapid recovery suggesting a fast elimination. Onset time of toxicity following the consumption of honey containing tutin is, on the contrary, highly variable. In 2008, a median onset time of 7.5 hours was found for the 11 confirmed cases with onset times ranging from half an hour to 17 hours after ingestion.

== Biological effects ==
Tutin has a toxic effect on both mammals and insects. It was looked into whether or not it would make a useful rodenticide. In rats it had a lethal effect within one hour at a dose rate of 55 mg/kg body weight. However, it was recommended that a more specific toxin should be used.

In humans it also has a toxic effect. Although the exact doses remain unknown, people have been incapacitated, hospitalised or even died from getting tutin into their system. A study has been conducted in which six men were given a tutin dose of 1.8 μg/kg body weight. Although the effects were hardly felt by the volunteers, unusual serum concentrations were observed. A peak in tutin concentration was observed one hour after ingestion, and a second, larger and prolonged peak was observed around 15 hours after ingestion. The reasons for this observation have yet to be determined. Side effects of tutin intoxication include: headaches, nausea, vomiting, dizziness and seizures.

The biological activities of tutin have been reported to be nearly identical with those of the other picrotoxane sesquiterpenes; picrotoxinin and coriamyrtin. Symptoms of tutin poisoning are for example: preliminary depression, salivation, a fall in the frequency of the pulse, increased breathing, and convulsions. The effect is due to an action on the medulla oblongata and basal ganglia of the brain.

== Toxicity ==
The effects of tutin poisoning were described to be salivation, a diminished heart beat, increased respiratory activity and later, predominantly clonic seizures which are in their early stages limited to the fore part of the body. Results of published acute toxicity studies on various animals are of limited value because of the uncertainty in the impurity profile for the administered tutin. For instance, Palmer-Jones (1947) reported an LD50 of 20 mg/kg of tutin via oral administration in rats. Administration via subcutaneous (SC) and intraperitoneal (IP) routes showed a higher acute toxicity with LD50 of approximately 4 and 5 mg/kg. Little is known about the lethal dose in the average human though tests have been performed on various animal species. For instance, intraperitoneal injection of tutin in rats has shown that concentrations of 3, 5 and 8 mg/kg were lethal whilst 1 mg/kg was non-lethal with all rats showing symptoms such as muscle spasms and general seizures. Documented human exposure to tutin implied that a dose of about a milligram causes nausea and vomiting in a healthy, full grown man.

== Effects on animals ==
Tutin has been known to cause death in sheep and cattle belonging to the settlers of New Zealand. Therefore, extensive research on the effects of tutin on different animal species has been done in the early 20th century. The symptoms after injection were more or less the same in all animals, and included rapid breathing, salivation, seizures and eventually death. The minimal lethal dose in cats and dogs was found to be around 1 mg/kg. In small rodents like rats, rabbits and guinea pigs, the minimal lethal dose was a little higher, around 2.5 mg/kg. In young animals, the minimal lethal dose is lower. Birds were thought to be immune to tutin poisoning, because they feed on the berries of the tutu plant. After research it became clear that birds have a high minimal lethal dose (around 10.25 mg/kg), but no absolute immunity. The apparent immunity in natural circumstances is because in order to reach a dose of 10.25 mg/kg, the birds need to eat more of the berries than they physically can. The relatively high lethal dose can be explained by the way birds digest food. From the crop (a part of the throat in many birds where food is stored before going into the stomach), the veins go directly to the systemic circulation, instead of first through the liver as in mammals.
