= Marianne Gittos =

Marianne Gittos (31 July 1830–24 January 1908) was a New Zealand Wesleyan mission worker, teacher, beekeeper and homemaker. She was born at the Māngungu Mission in Northland, New Zealand on 31 July 1830.
