= Říčany (disambiguation) =

Říčany is a town in the Central Bohemian Region of the Czech Republic.

Říčany may also refer to:

- Říčany (Brno-Country District), a municipality and village in the South Moravian Region of the Czech Republic

== See also ==
- Řečany nad Labem, in the Pardubice Region of the Czech Republic
- Ricania, a genus of planthoppers
