= Pharsalus =

Pharsalus may refer to:

- Pharsalus (planthopper), a genus of insects in the family Ricaniidae
- Farsala, a city in Greece, known in antiquity as Pharsalos
- Battle of Pharsalus (disambiguation)
