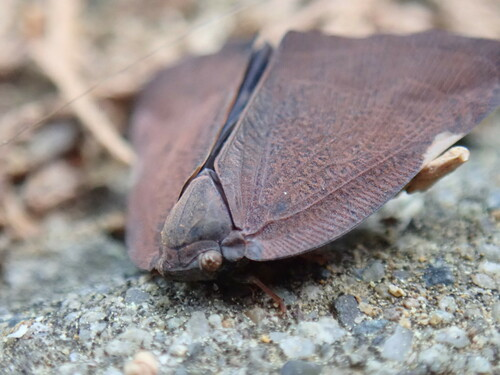

Scientific classification
- Kingdom: Animalia
- Phylum: Arthropoda
- Clade: Pancrustacea
- Class: Insecta
- Order: Hemiptera
- Suborder: Auchenorrhyncha
- Infraorder: Fulgoromorpha
- Family: Ricaniidae
- Genus: Pochazia
- Species: P. shantungensis

Binomial name
- Pochazia shantungensis (Chou & Lu, 1977)

Synonyms
- Ricania shantungensis Chou & Lu, 1977

= Pochazia shantungensis =

Species of planthopper

Pochazia shantungensis, commonly known as the brown-winged planthopper, is a species of planthopper in the family Ricaniidae. It is native to China, and it has been reported as introduced or invasive outside its native range in parts of East Asia, Europe and West Asia. It is a highly polyphagous sap-feeding insect and is regarded as a pest of fruit trees, ornamental plants, and other woody hosts.

== Taxonomy ==
The species was described by Chou and Lu in 1977 as Ricania shantungensis and is now placed in the genus Pochazia. It is externally similar to Pochazia chinensis, a species described in 2024, and some records formerly attributed to P. shantungensis have been re-examined because of confusion between the two species. In the Republic of Korea, the population first detected in the country was later identified as P. chinensis, whereas P. shantungensis was found mainly in the south.

== Description ==
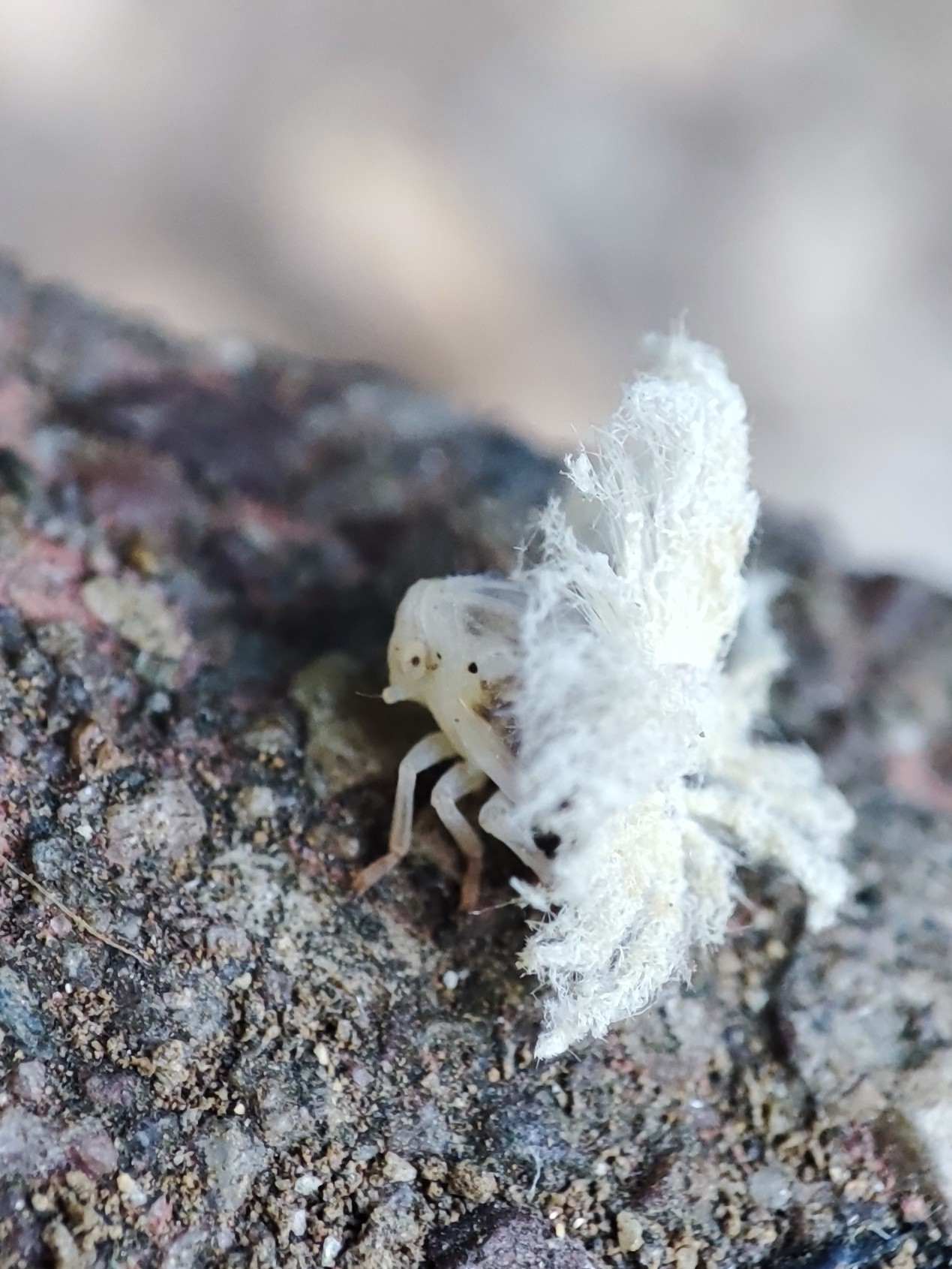
Nymph with waxy filaments at the end of the abdomen, in a park on the Asian side of Istanbul.

Adults are brownish to dark brown planthoppers with broad forewings, usually bearing a pale oval mark near the costal margin. Males measure 7.5 - 7.8 mm from the vertex to the tip of the genitalia and 14.0 - 14.4 mm from the vertex to the tip of the forewings; females are slightly larger, measuring 8.3 - 8.8 mm and 15.0 - 15.3 mm respectively.

Nymphs are pale to creamy yellow or whitish and are covered with conspicuous waxy filaments. They have grey-brown markings and a cluster of wax filaments at the end of the abdomen, which may be longer than the body in later instars.

== Distribution ==
Pochazia shantungensis has been recorded from several Chinese provinces, including Fujian, Guangxi, Hubei, Shaanxi, Shandong and Zhejiang. It is also recorded from Japan and the Republic of Korea, although some East Asian records have been affected by confusion with Pochazia chinensis.

In the EPPO region, the species was first reported from Turkey and France, based on specimens collected in 2018. It is currently listed as present in several European countries and in Russia, although its status varies between established, restricted, transient and unreliable records depending on the country. In Turkey, published records are concentrated in the Marmara region, including Istanbul, Kocaeli and Yalova provinces. Citizen-science observations suggest a wider Turkish distribution, but published provincial records are incomplete.

A transient record from the United States, in the state of Georgia, was reported by EPPO in 2026. At the time of the report, it was not known whether the species had become established there.

== Hosts and habitat ==
The species is associated with a wide range of woody plants in orchards, gardens, parks, forests and other cultivated or semi-natural habitats. There are more than 200 recorded hosts of P. shantungensis in 81 plant families, including fruit trees, forest trees, and ornamentals. Economically important hosts include apple, blueberry, chestnut, peach, and persimmon.

In the Republic of Korea, recorded hosts include Diospyros kaki, Zelkova serrata, Aralia elata, Styrax japonicus, Salix gracilistyla, Albizia julibrissin, Ailanthus altissima, Chaenomeles sinensis, Rubus crataegifolius, Castanea crenata, and Robinia pseudoacacia.

In Istanbul, the species are recorded on urban and ornamental plants, with Ligustrum lucidum and Olea europaea identified as important hosts.

== Biology and damage ==
The species overwinters as eggs inserted into host-plant tissue, usually in young twigs. The egg masses are covered with white waxy filaments. In the Republic of Korea, eggs hatch from May, nymphs develop during spring and early summer, and adults are usually observed from July. One generation per year has been reported in the Republic of Korea, while two generations per year occur in China and have also been observed in Turkey.

Damage may result from sap feeding, oviposition in young branches and honeydew production. Honeydew can promote the development of sooty mould on leaves and other plant surfaces.

== Management ==
Studies on management have examined insecticide applications, plant-derived products, and yellow sticky traps. Host plants may also spread the species when eggs are carried on young branches.
