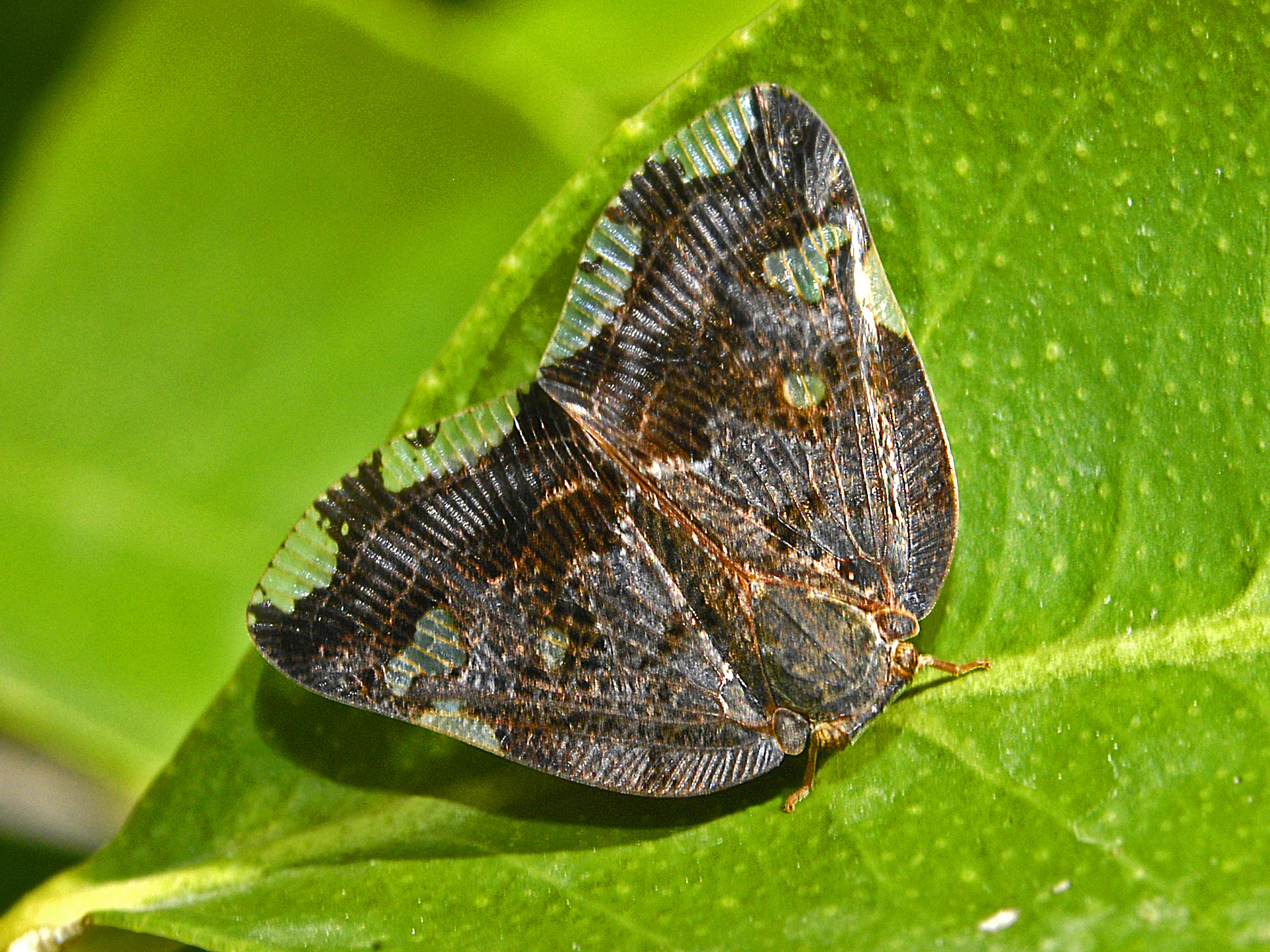
- Ricania speculum on citrus. Dorsal view
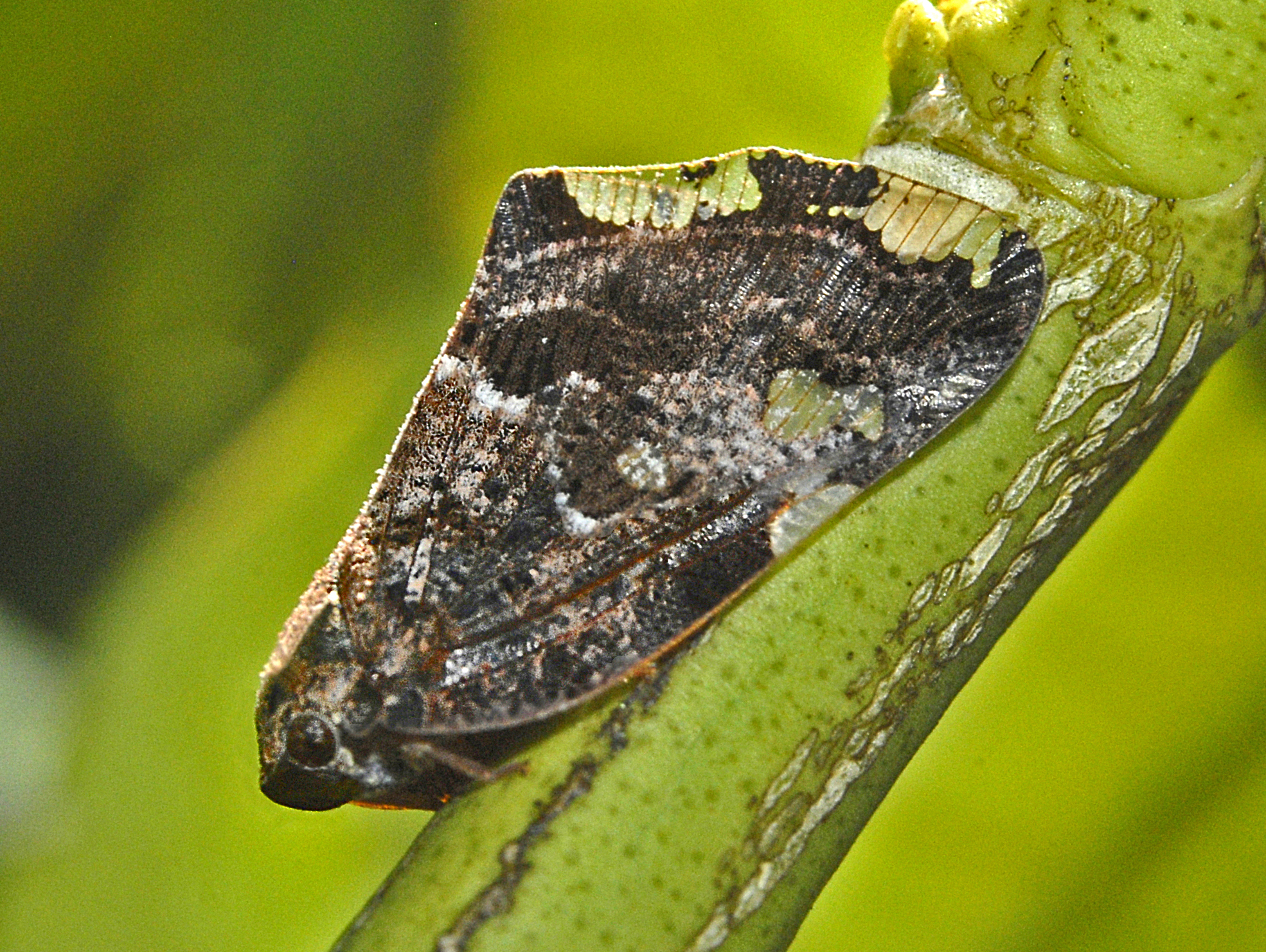
- Lateral view

Scientific classification
- Kingdom: Animalia
- Phylum: Arthropoda
- Class: Insecta
- Order: Hemiptera
- Suborder: Auchenorrhyncha
- Infraorder: Fulgoromorpha
- Family: Ricaniidae
- Genus: Ricania
- Species: R. speculum

Binomial name
- Ricania speculum (Walker, 1851)

Synonyms
- Flatoides perforatus Walker, 1851[1]; Flatoides speculum Walker, 1851; Ricania malaya Stål, 1854

= Ricania speculum =

Species of true bug

Ricania speculum, common name Black planthopper or Ricaniid Planthopper, is a species of planthoppers belonging to the family Ricaniidae.

This species is considered a major agricultural pest for several crops in tropical and subtropical areas (apples, coffee plants, oil palms, Citrus species, etc.).

== Distribution and habitat ==
This species is widespread in China, India, Indonesia, Japan, Korea, Philippines and Vietnam. Recently, it has been accidentally introduced in northern Italy, possibly with ornamental plants or crops. This species can be found in the low-elevation mountains and prefers dark environments.

== Description ==
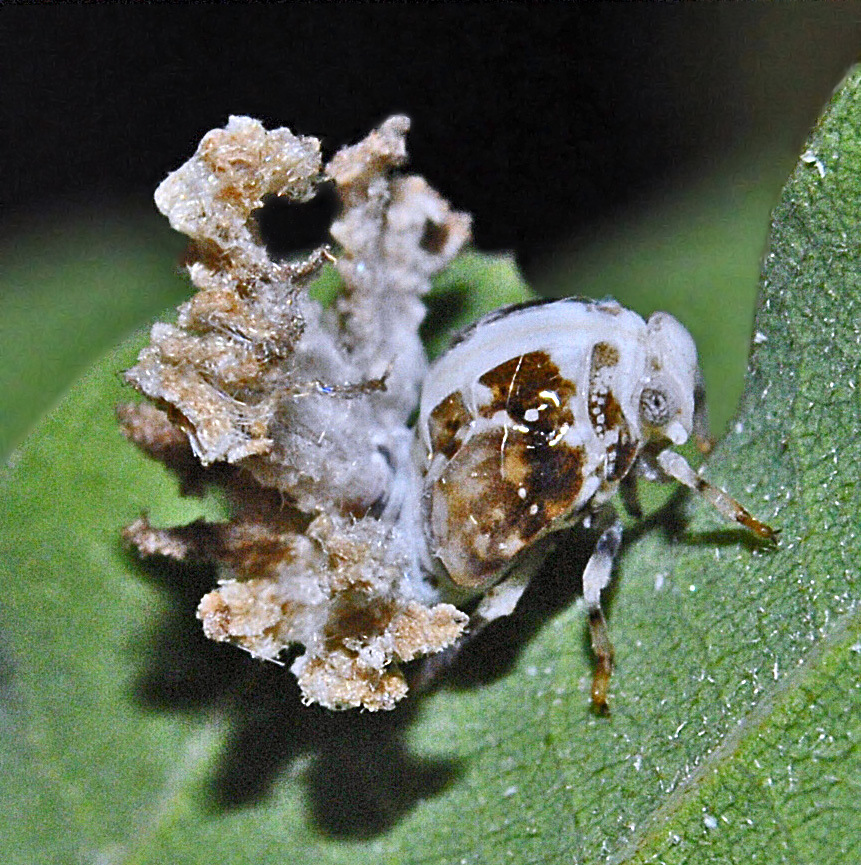
Nymph of Ricania speculum

Ricania speculum can reach a length of about 8 millimetres (0.31 in), with a wingspan of about 15 millimetres (0.59 in). These planthoppers have dark brown wings with central wavy horizontal bands and irregular transparent patches of different sizes. The precostal area of the forewings shows dense transverse veinlets and the costal margin is distinctly convex near the base. In males the tip of the abdomen is pointed, while in females is rounded. The final instar nymphs are white with dark brown markings and waxy secretions on the abdomen.

== Biology ==
These insects feed on sap that they suck from the leaves of the host plants. Ricania speculum has a single generation per year. The eggs overwinter in the bark of the branches waiting for the spring hatching.
