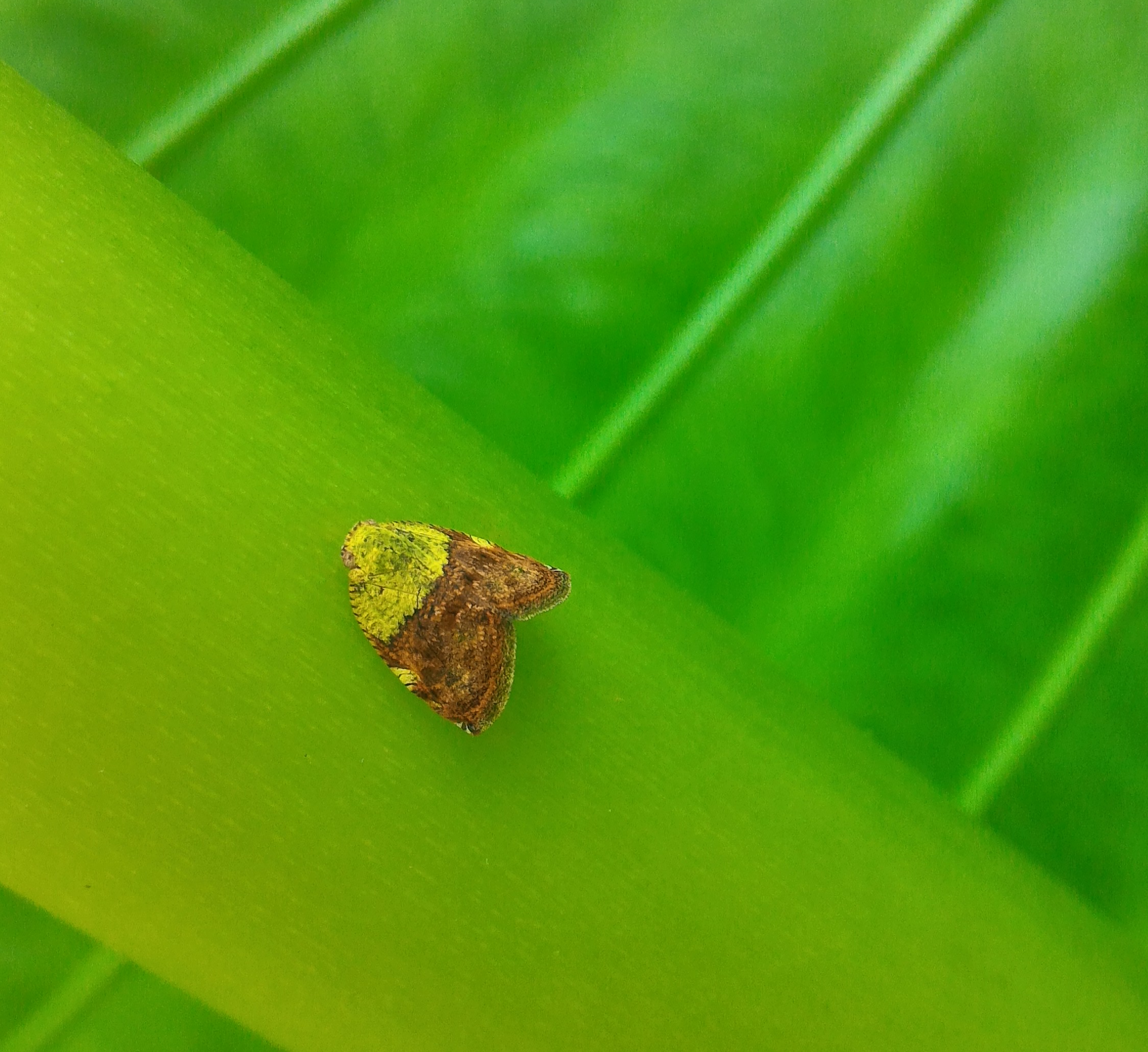

Scientific classification
- Kingdom: Animalia
- Phylum: Arthropoda
- Clade: Pancrustacea
- Class: Insecta
- Order: Hemiptera
- Suborder: Auchenorrhyncha
- Infraorder: Fulgoromorpha
- Family: Ricaniidae
- Genus: Ricanula
- Species: R. stigmatica

Binomial name
- Ricanula stigmatica (Stål, 1869)

= Ricanula stigmatica =

Species of true bug

Ricanula stigmatica is a small and common fulgoroidea planthopper from the family Ricaniidae. It is moth-like in appearance, with green and brown coloration. This species can be found in Southeast Asia.
