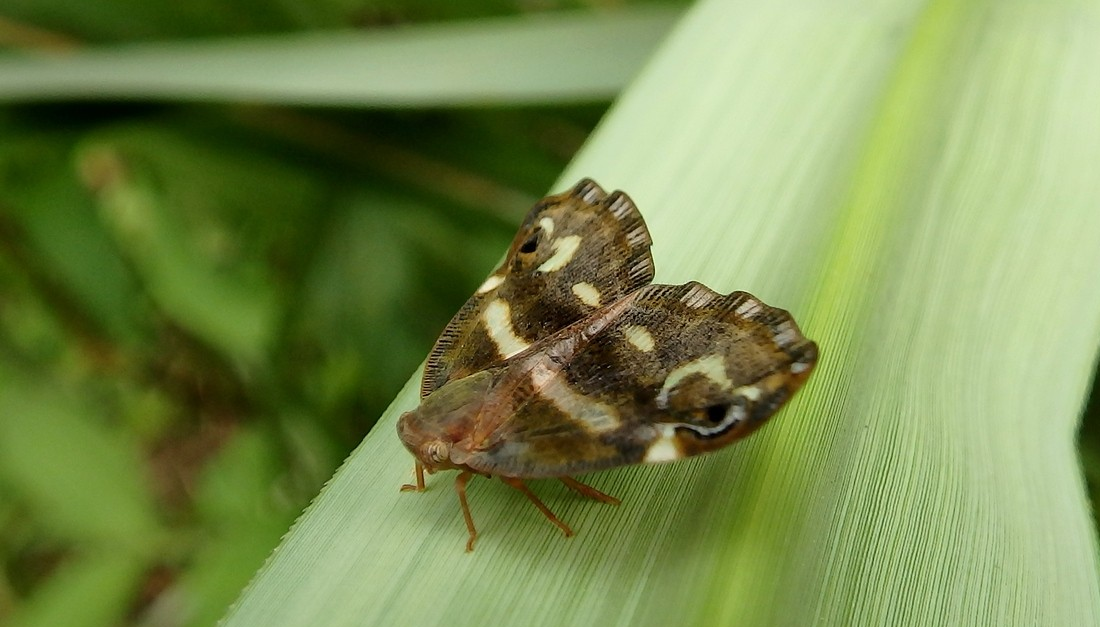

Scientific classification
- Domain: Eukaryota
- Kingdom: Animalia
- Phylum: Arthropoda
- Class: Insecta
- Order: Hemiptera
- Suborder: Auchenorrhyncha
- Infraorder: Fulgoromorpha
- Family: Ricaniidae
- Genus: Ricania
- Species: R. simulans

Binomial name
- Ricania simulans Walker, 1851

= Ricania simulans =

Species of planthopper

Ricania simulans is a species of planthopper found in South Asia and the Palearctic regions.

== Description ==
The head, pronotum, abdomen, and lower body of this species are dull reddish brown. Its legs, the edges of the top of its head, the sides of its face, clypeus, mesonotum, and the base of the abdomen and anal appendage are yellowish brown. Its tegmina are pale brown. Its wings are a smoky color, with darker outer edges and lighter bands and markings throughout. From the head to the end of the tegmina, it is approximately 13.5mm in length.

== Distribution ==
Ricania simulans has a broad population in Japan, Southern China, Taiwan, Korea, Ukraine, Russia, and Georgia.

== Life cycle ==
Ricania simulans nymphs have five nymphal stages, emerging in late spring. Adults emerge in the summer and lay their eggs in the early August. The species overwinters in the egg stage and spawns one generation in a year.

== Interactions with humans ==
Ricania simulans nymphs and adults feed on the fluids of plants, bushes, and young trees, and often feed on crops. As a result, they are seen as an agricultural pest and are the target of pesticide usage.
