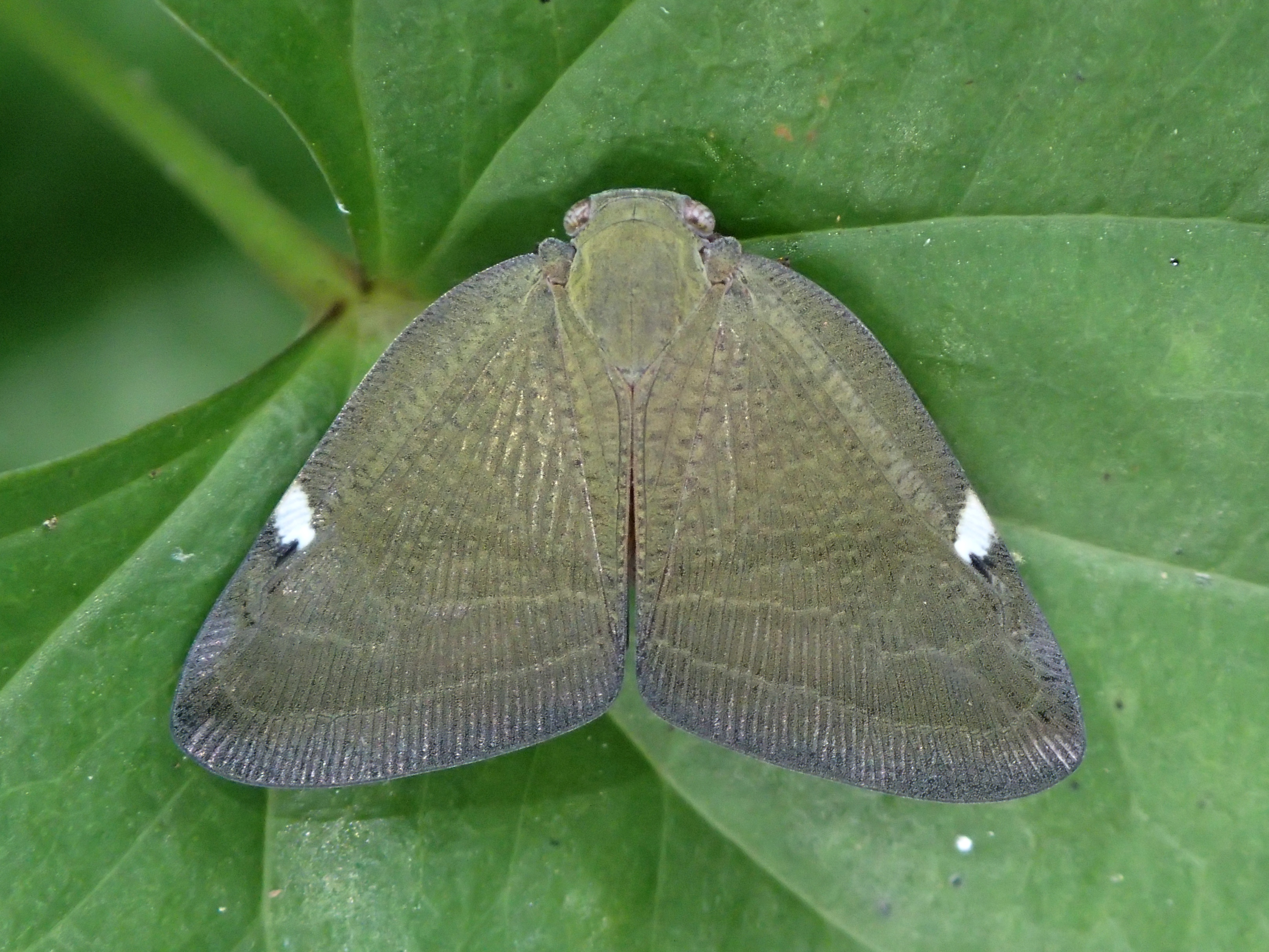
- Pochazia albomaculata (Japan)

Scientific classification
- Domain: Eukaryota
- Kingdom: Animalia
- Phylum: Arthropoda
- Class: Insecta
- Order: Hemiptera
- Suborder: Auchenorrhyncha
- Infraorder: Fulgoromorpha
- Family: Ricaniidae
- Subfamily: Ricaniinae
- Genus: Pochazia; Amyot & Audinet-Serville, 1843

= Pochazia =

Genus of insects

Pochazia is a genus of true bugs belonging to the family Ricaniidae.

The species of this genus are found in Africa and Southeastern Asia.

== Species ==
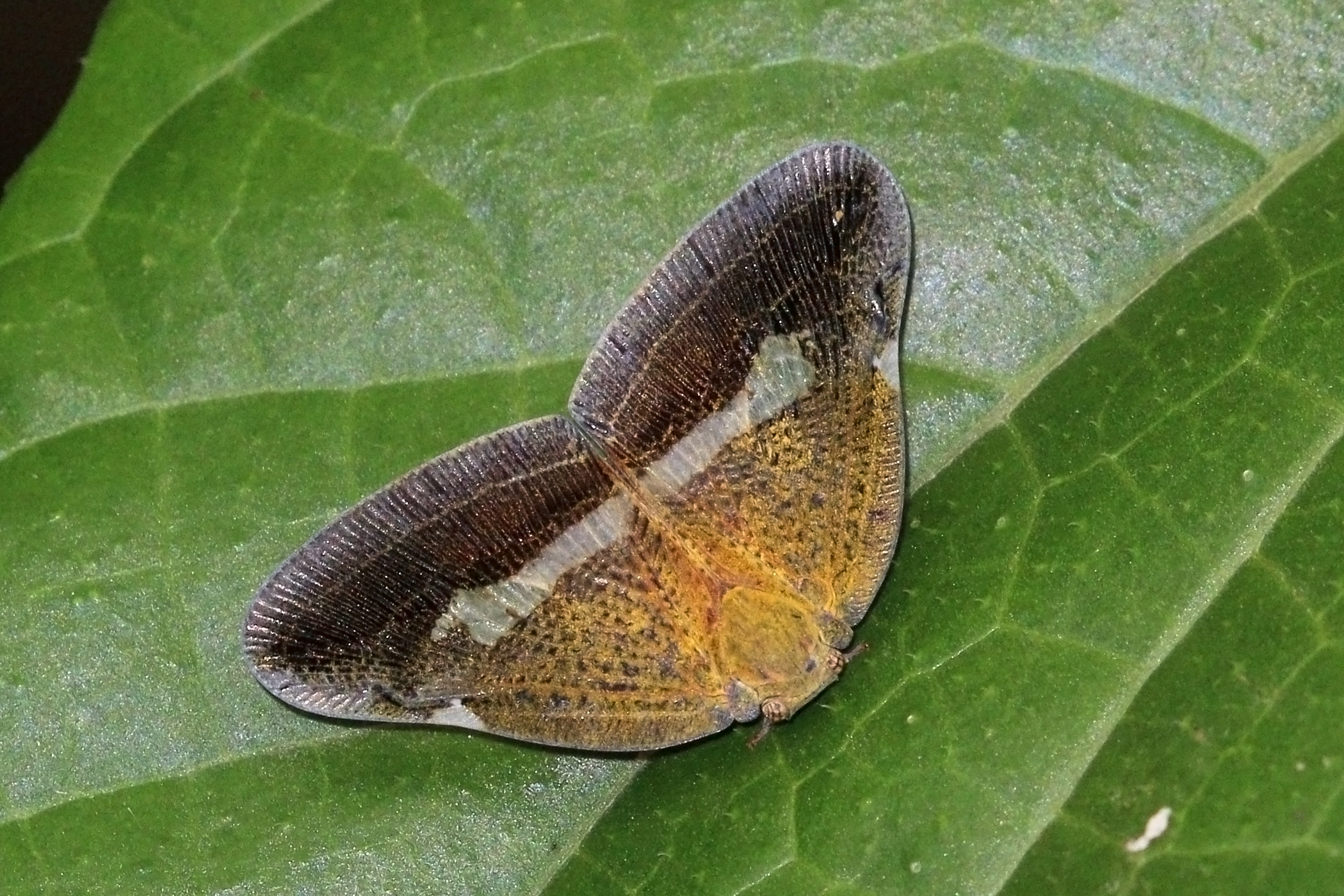
Pochazia fasciata (Ghana)

Fulgoromorpha Lists on the Web and GBIF include:

1. Pochazia 5-costatus Signoret, 1860
2. Pochazia albomaculata (Uhler, 1896)
3. Pochazia angulata (Kirby, 1891)
4. Pochazia antica (Gray, 1832)
5. Pochazia antigone Kirkaldy, 1902
6. Pochazia anwari Shakila, 1984
7. Pochazia atkinsoni Distant, 1906
8. Pochazia aurulenta Distant, 1909
9. Pochazia barbara Melichar, 1898
10. Pochazia biperforata Signoret, 1860
11. Pochazia chienfengensis Chou & Lu, 1977
12. Pochazia citri Shakila, 1984
13. Pochazia confusa Distant, 1906
14. Pochazia convergens Walker, 1857
15. Pochazia crocata Melichar, 1898
16. Pochazia discreta Melichar, 1898
17. Pochazia dohrni Schmidt, 1905
18. Pochazia emarginata (Walker, 1857)
19. Pochazia facialis Kato, 1934
20. Pochazia fasciata (Spinola, 1839) - type species
21. Pochazia fasciatifrons (Stål, 1870)
22. Pochazia fumata (Amyot & Audinet-Serville, 1843)
23. Pochazia funebris Stål, 1865
24. Pochazia funerea Melichar, 1912
25. Pochazia gradiens Walker, 1857
26. Pochazia guttifera Walker, 1851
27. Pochazia inclyta Walker, 1870
28. Pochazia incompleta Melichar, 1898
29. Pochazia interrupta Walker, 1851
30. Pochazia mamyona Distant, 1916
31. Pochazia marginalis Melichar, 1914
32. Pochazia nigropunctata Signoret, 1860
33. Pochazia papuana Kirkaldy, 1909
34. Pochazia quinqueplagiata Schmidt, 1911
35. Pochazia rufifrons Melichar, 1923
36. Pochazia shantungensis (Chou & Lu, 1977)
37. Pochazia sinuata Stål, 1865
38. Pochazia subatomaria (Walker, 1870)
39. Pochazia subflava Distant, 1909
40. Pochazia transversa Melichar, 1898
41. Pochazia triangularis Distant, 1906
42. Pochazia trinitatis Chou & Lu, 1977
43. Pochazia umbrata Melichar, 1898
44. Pochazia zizzata Chou & Lu, 1977
