= Plestia =

Scientific classification
- Kingdom: Animalia
- Phylum: Arthropoda
- Class: Insecta
- Order: Hemiptera
- Suborder: Auchenorrhyncha
- Infraorder: Fulgoromorpha
- Family: Ricaniidae
- Subfamily: Ricaniinae
- Genus: Plestia; Stål, 1870

Species
- See text

Genus of planthoppers

Plestia is a genus of planthoppers in the subfamily Ricaniinae, erected by Carl Stål in 1870.

== Species ==
- Plestia andromeda Fennah, 1950
- Plestia anomala Muir, 1921
- Plestia antigone Fennah, 1950
- Plestia arethusa Fennah, 1950
- Plestia artemis Fennah, 1950
- Plestia calypso Fennah, 1950
- Plestia cassandra Fennah, 1950
- Plestia cassiopeia Fennah, 1950
- Plestia circe Fennah, 1950
- Plestia danae Fennah, 1950
- Plestia deianira Fennah, 1950
- Plestia eurydice Fennah, 1950
- Plestia galatea Fennah, 1950
- Plestia io Fennah, 1950
- Plestia iphigeneia Fennah, 1950
- Plestia kellersi Muir, 1921
- Plestia marginata (Montrouzier, 1861)
- Plestia medusa Fennah, 1950
- Plestia minuta Muir, 1931
- Plestia naias Fennah, 1950
- Plestia nereis Fennah, 1950
- Plestia niobe Fennah, 1950
- Plestia oceanica (Perroud & Montrouzier, 1864)
- Plestia scylla Fennah, 1950
- Plestia thetis Fennah, 1950
- Plestia trimaculifrons Muir, 1931
- Plestia viridis Muir, 1931
