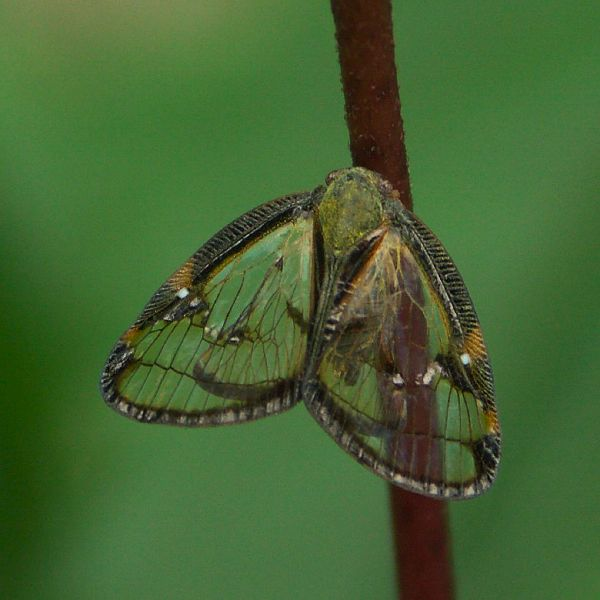
- Euricania facialis

Scientific classification
- Kingdom: Animalia
- Phylum: Arthropoda
- Clade: Pancrustacea
- Class: Insecta
- Order: Hemiptera
- Suborder: Auchenorrhyncha
- Infraorder: Fulgoromorpha
- Family: Ricaniidae
- Subfamily: Ricaniinae
- Genus: Euricania; Melichar, 1898

= Euricania =

Genus of insects

Euricania is a genus of true bugs belonging to the family Ricaniidae.

The species of this genus are found in Southeastern Asia.

Species:

- Euricania aperiens (Walker, 1858)
- Euricania brevicula Xu, Liang & Jiang, 2006
- Euricania camilla Fennah, 1950
- Euricania clara Kato, 1932
- Euricania cliduchus Fennah, 1950
- Euricania concinna (Stål, 1863)
- Euricania cyane Fennah, 1950
- Euricania dinon Fennah, 1950
- Euricania discigutta (Walker, 1862)
- Euricania facialis (Walker, 1858)
- Euricania furina Fennah, 1950
- Euricania fusconebulosa (Lallemand, 1935)
- Euricania gloriosa Distant, 1911
- Euricania hyalinocosta Melichar, 1898
- Euricania infesta Melichar, 1898
- Euricania laetoria Fennah, 1950
- Euricania licinia Fennah, 1950
- Euricania longa Xu, Liang & Jiang, 2006
- Euricania moneta Fennah, 1950
- Euricania morio Melichar, 1898
- Euricania ocella (Walker, 1851)
- Euricania oculata (Guérin-Méneville, 1831)
- Euricania opora Fennah, 1950
- Euricania paraclara Ren, Stroinski & Qin, 2015
- Euricania pedicellata (Jacobi, 1928)
- Euricania procilla Fennah, 1950
- Euricania progne Fennah, 1950
- Euricania sirenia Fennah, 1950
- Euricania splendida (Fabricius, 1803)
- Euricania stellata Distant, 1914
- Euricania sterope Fennah, 1950
- Euricania subapicalis (Walker, 1870)
- Euricania tibialis (Walker, 1858)
- Euricania tristicula (Stål, 1865)
- Euricania xizangensis L.
