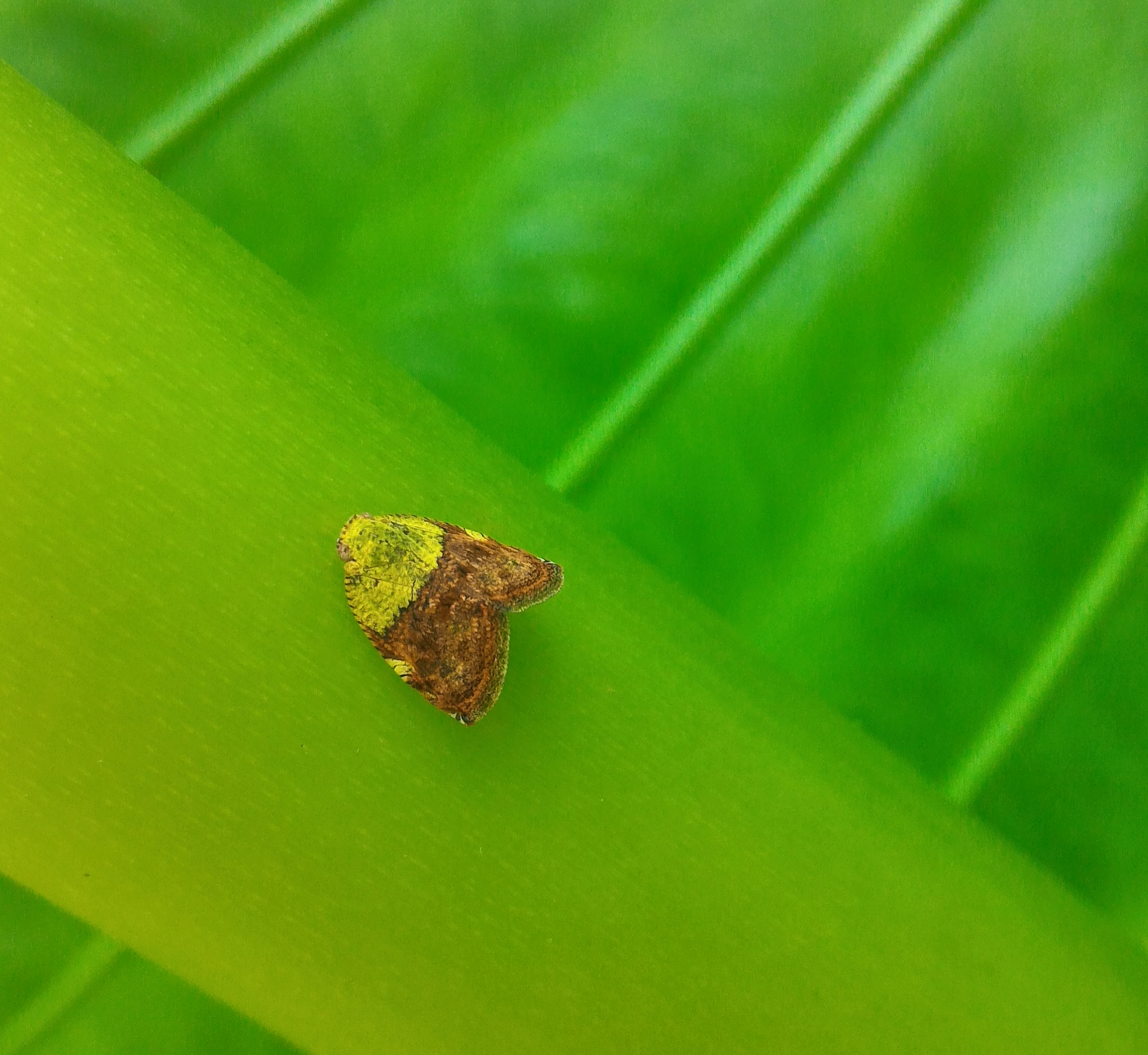
- Ricanula stigmatica

Scientific classification
- Kingdom: Animalia
- Phylum: Arthropoda
- Class: Insecta
- Order: Hemiptera
- Suborder: Auchenorrhyncha
- Infraorder: Fulgoromorpha
- Family: Ricaniidae
- Genus: Ricanula

Species
- See text

= Ricanula =

Genus of true bugs

Ricanula is a genus of true bugs belonging to the family Ricaniidae.

== Species ==
Species within this genus include:

- Ricanula adjuncta
- Ricanula amethystinula
- Ricanula bitaeniata
- Ricanula cacaonis
- Ricanula conspersa
- Ricanula crocea
- Ricanula curva
- Ricanula densa
- Ricanula discoptera
- Ricanula fujianensis
- Ricanula guineensis
- Ricanula hainanensis
- Ricanula horvathi
- Ricanula integra
- Ricanula intermedia
- Ricanula jacobii
- Ricanula karaseki
- Ricanula limitaris
- Ricanula luridella
- Ricanula morosa
- Ricanula nivisignata
- Ricanula noualhieri
- Ricanula opistholeuca
- Ricanula peronata
- Ricanula pulverosa
- Ricanula puncticosta
- Ricanula punctulata
- Ricanula signata
- Ricanula sollicita
- Ricanula spoliata
- Ricanula stigma
- Ricanula stigmatica
- Ricanula sublimata
- Ricanula trimaculata
- Ricanula unica
