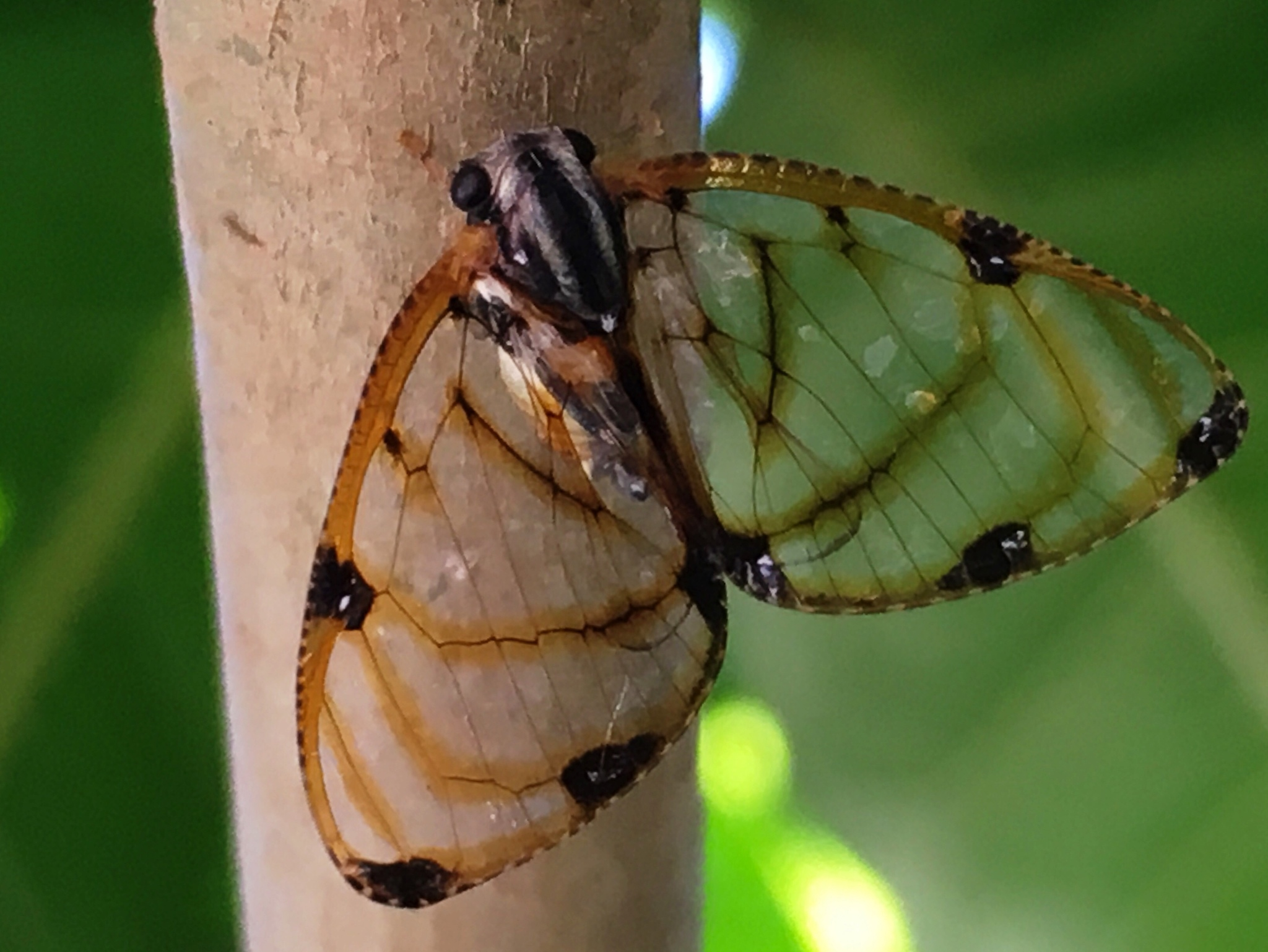
- Alisca tagalica

Scientific classification
- Kingdom: Animalia
- Phylum: Arthropoda
- Class: Insecta
- Order: Hemiptera
- Suborder: Auchenorrhyncha
- Infraorder: Fulgoromorpha
- Family: Ricaniidae
- Subfamily: Ricaniinae
- Genus: Alisca; Stål, 1870

= Alisca =

Genus of insects

Alisca is a genus of planthoppers in the subfamily Ricaniinae, erected by Carl Stål in 1870.

== Species ==
Fulgoromorpha Lists on the Web includes the following, recorded from the Philippines and Sulawesi:

1. Alisca circumpicta Stål, 1870
2. Alisca compacta Melichar, 1898
3. Alisca tagalica (Stål, 1865) - type species
