= Marleyia =

Scientific classification
- Domain: Eukaryota
- Kingdom: Animalia
- Phylum: Arthropoda
- Class: Insecta
- Order: Hemiptera
- Suborder: Auchenorrhyncha
- Infraorder: Fulgoromorpha
- Family: Ricaniidae
- Subfamily: Ricaniinae
- Genus: Marleyia; Distant, 1909

Genus of insects

Marleyia is a genus of planthoppers in the subfamily Ricaniinae, erected by William Lucas Distant in 1909.

== Species ==
Fulgoromorpha Lists on the Web includes:

1. Marleyia albomaculata Distant, 1909
2. Marleyia brunnescens Distant, 1909 - type species
