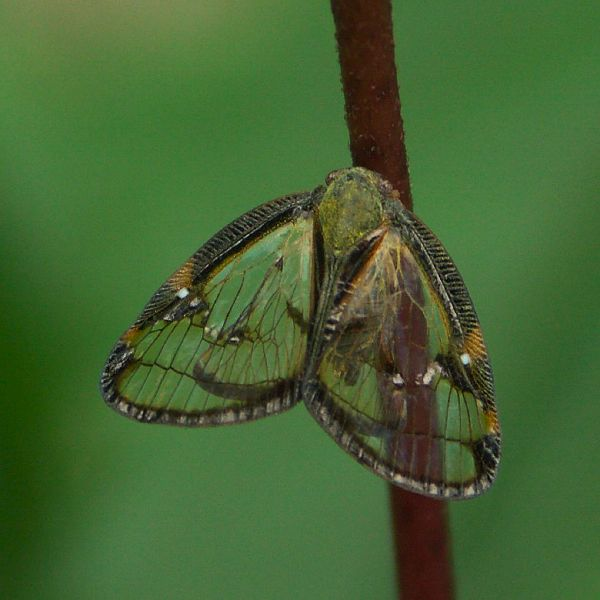

Scientific classification
- Kingdom: Animalia
- Phylum: Arthropoda
- Class: Insecta
- Order: Hemiptera
- Suborder: Auchenorrhyncha
- Infraorder: Fulgoromorpha
- Family: Ricaniidae
- Genus: Euricania
- Species: E. facialis

Binomial name
- Euricania facialis (Walker, 1858)

= Euricania facialis =

Species of true bug

Euricania facialis is a species of insect in the family Ricaniidae. It is found in China (Fujian, Zhejiang, Jiangxi, Henan, Shanxi), Taiwan and Japan.
