= Řečany nad Labem =

- Municipality
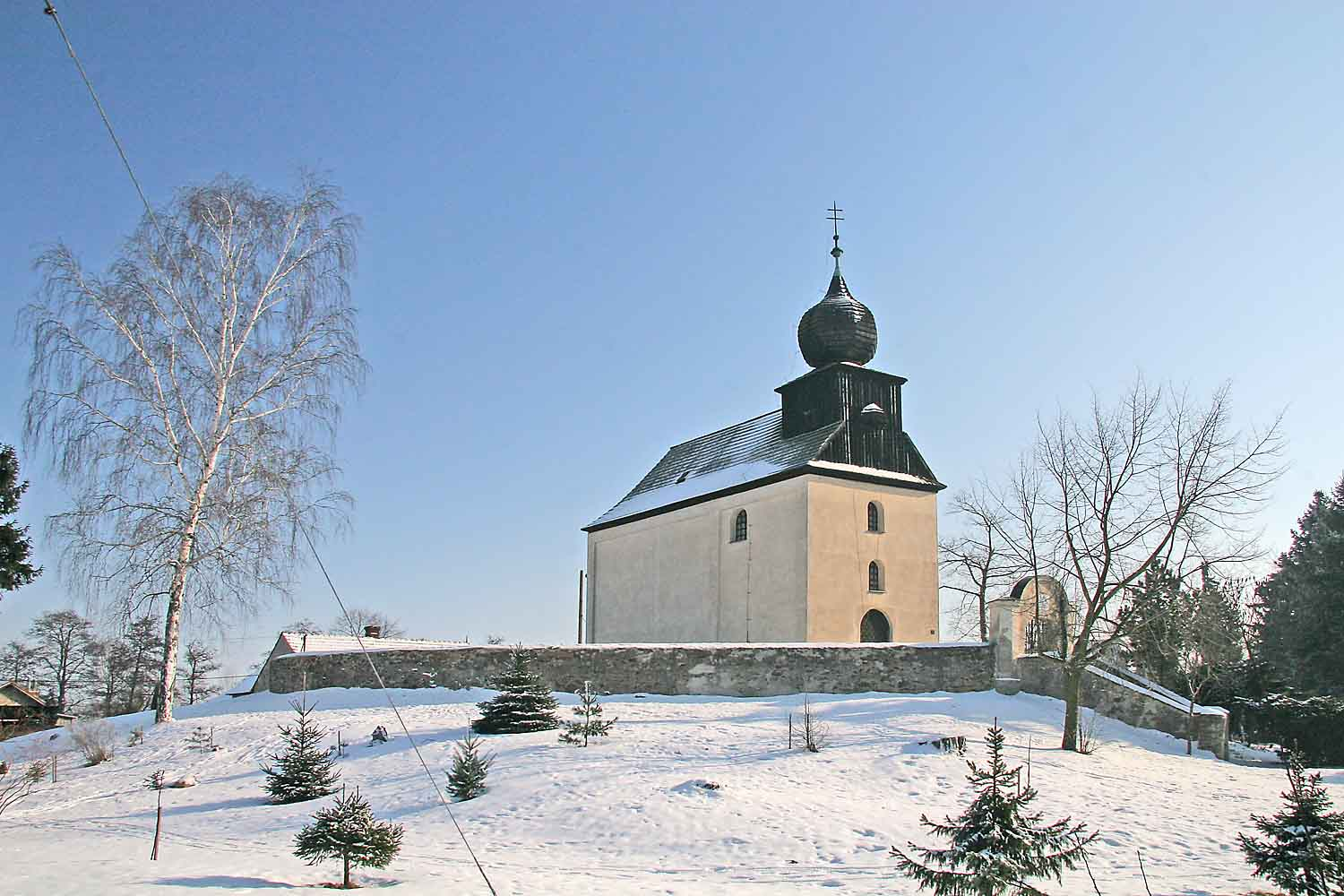
- Church of Saint Mary Magdalene

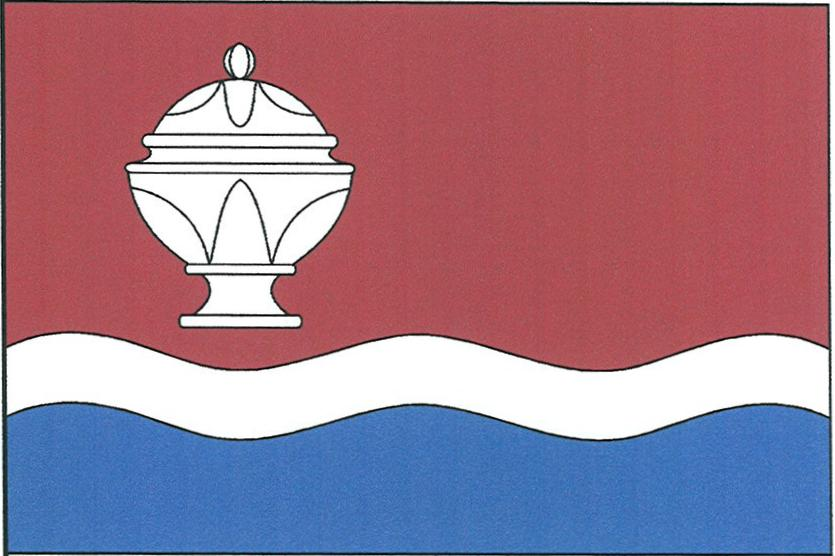
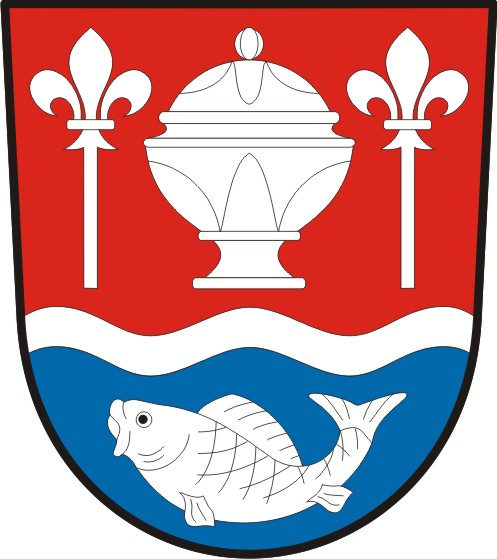
- Flag Coat of arms

- Location in the Czech Republic
- Coordinates: 50°2′9″N 15°28′39″E
- Country: Czech Republic
- Region: Pardubice
- District: Pardubice
- First mentioned: 1289

Area
  - Total: 5.52 km^{2} (2.13 sq mi)
- Elevation: 207 m (679 ft)

Population (2026-01-01)
  - Total: 1,419
  - Density: 257/km^{2} (666/sq mi)
- Time zone: UTC+1 (CET)
  - Summer (DST): UTC+2 (CEST)
- Postal code: 533 13
- Website: www.recanynadlabem.cz

Řečany nad Labem is a municipality and village in Pardubice District in the Pardubice Region of the Czech Republic. It has about 1,400 inhabitants.

== Administrative division ==
Řečany nad Labem consists of two municipal parts (in brackets population according to the 2021 census):

- Řečany nad Labem (1,128)
- Labětín (216)

== Demographics ==
Historical population
Year	Pop.	±%
1869	771	—
1880	778	+0.9%
1890	770	−1.0%
1900	775	+0.6%
1910	853	+10.1%
1921	953	+11.7%
1930	1,027	+7.8%
1950	992	−3.4%
1961	1,262	+27.2%
1970	1,336	+5.9%
1980	1,354	+1.3%
1991	1,387	+2.4%
2001	1,387	+0.0%
2011	1,364	−1.7%
2021	1,344	−1.5%
Source: Censuses
