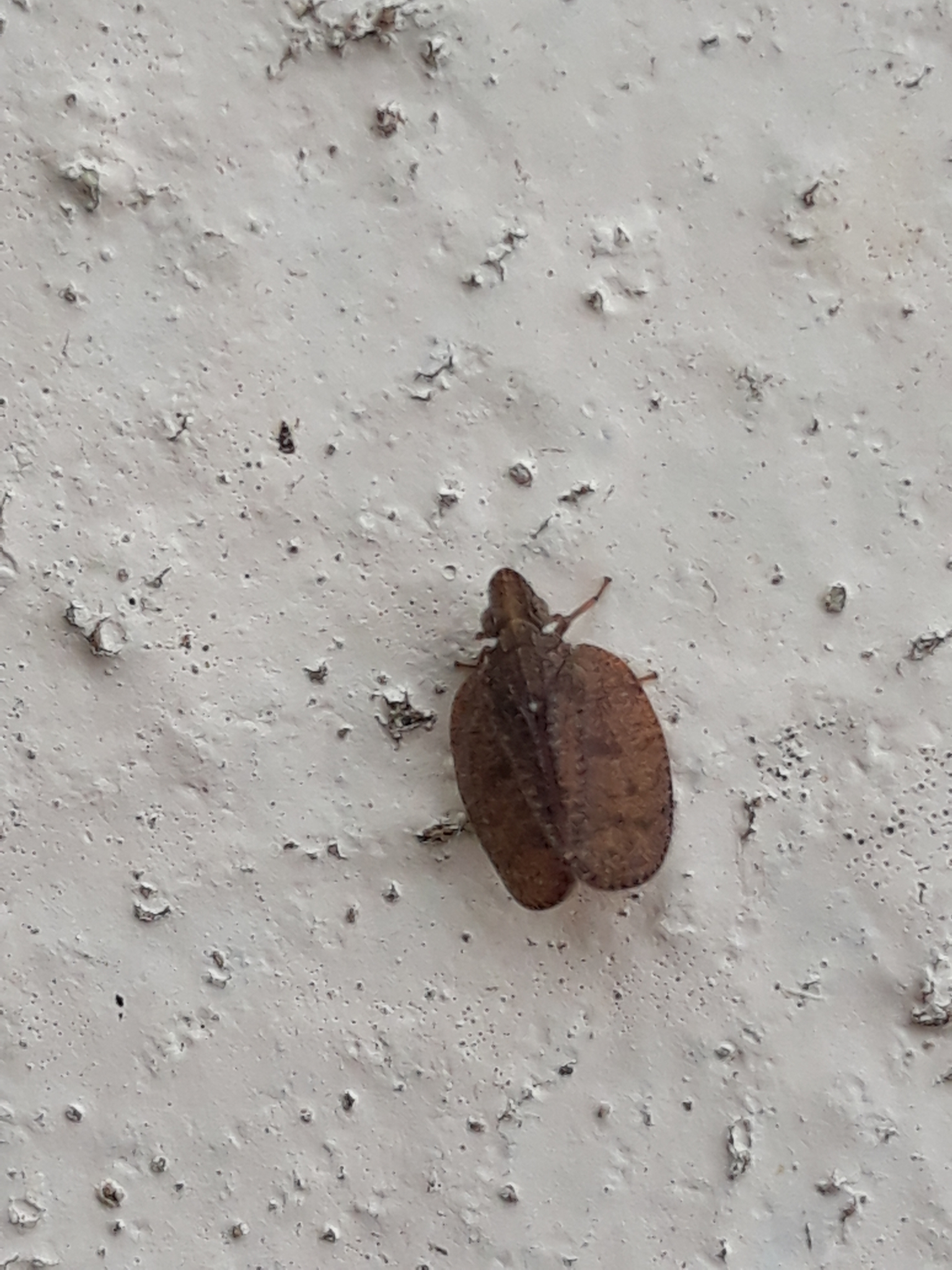

Scientific classification
- Kingdom: Animalia
- Phylum: Arthropoda
- Clade: Pancrustacea
- Class: Insecta
- Order: Hemiptera
- Suborder: Auchenorrhyncha
- Infraorder: Fulgoromorpha
- Family: Ricaniidae
- Subfamily: Pharsalinae
- Genus: Pharsalus; Melichar, 1906
- Species: P. repandus

Binomial name
- Pharsalus repandus Melichar, 1906

= Pharsalus repandus =

Genus of planthoppers

Pharsalus repandus is a species of planthopper in the family Ricaniidae that was first described by Leopold Melichar in 1906. It is the sole member of the genus Pharsalus, the type genus of the subfamily Pharsalinae.
