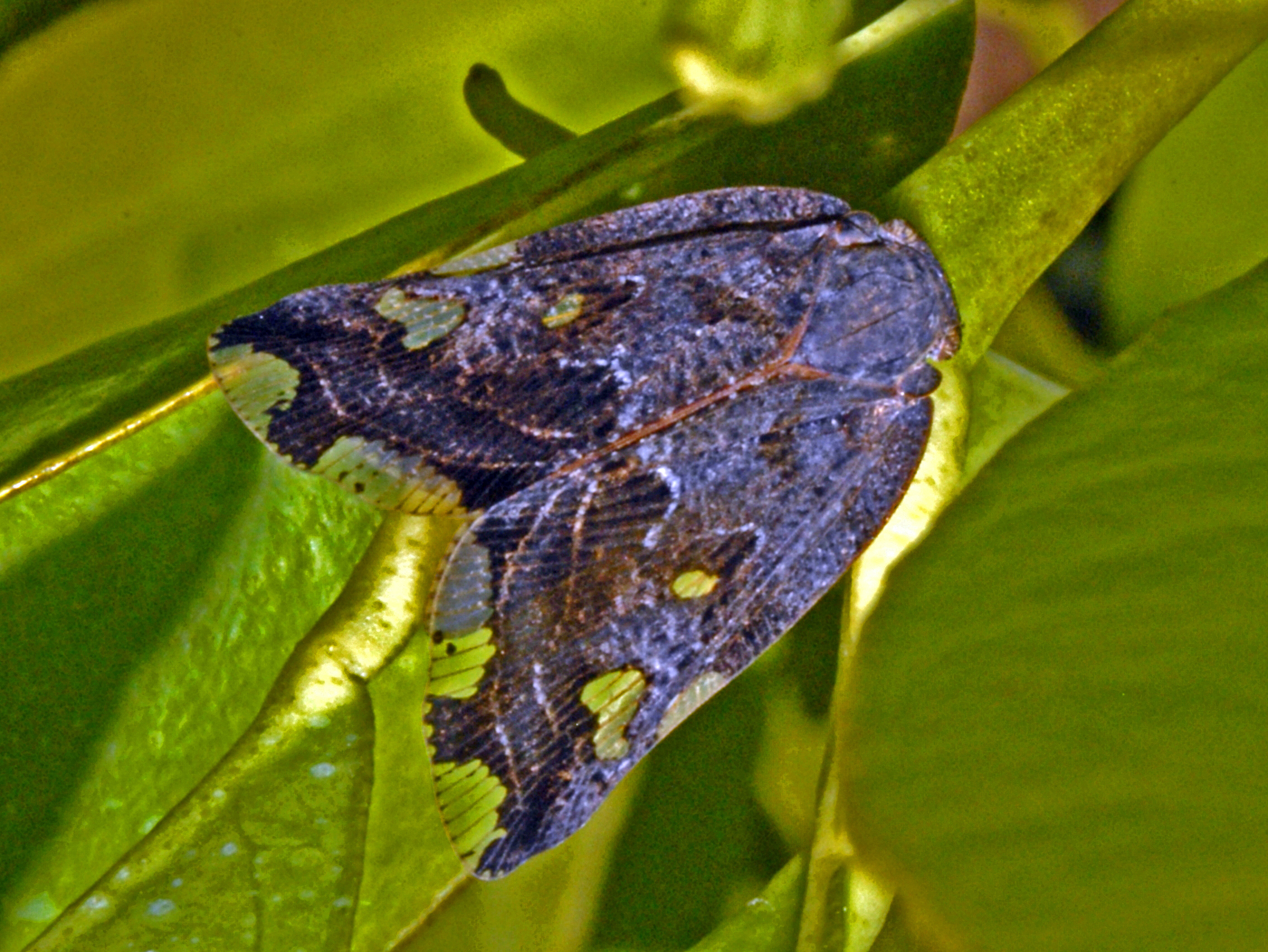
- Ricania speculum

Scientific classification
- Domain: Eukaryota
- Kingdom: Animalia
- Phylum: Arthropoda
- Class: Insecta
- Order: Hemiptera
- Suborder: Auchenorrhyncha
- Infraorder: Fulgoromorpha
- Family: Ricaniidae
- Subfamily: Ricaniinae
- Genus: Ricania; Germar, 1818

Species
- See text

= Ricania =

Genus of true bugs

Ricania is a genus of planthoppers belonging to the family Ricaniidae.

== Species ==
Species within this genus include:

- Ricania apicalis
- Ricania atra
- Ricania aurora
- Ricania berezovskii
- Ricania bicolorata
- Ricania binotata
- Ricania burgeoni
- Ricania caliginosa
- Ricania cervina
- Ricania confusa
- Ricania congoensis
- Ricania consanguinea
- Ricania coorgensis
- Ricania corusca
- Ricania costimacula
- Ricania depressicollis
- Ricania episcopalis
- Ricania episcopus
- Ricania erlangeri
- Ricania eximia
- Ricania fenestrata
- Ricania flavifrontalis
- Ricania fumosa
- Ricania fusca
- Ricania fusconebulosa
- Ricania fuscula
- Ricania geometra
- Ricania guttata
- Ricania hedenborgi
- Ricania hewitti
- Ricania impervia
- Ricania indicata
- Ricania insularis
- Ricania japonica
- Ricania keiseri
- Ricania laratica
- Ricania limbata
- Ricania luctuosa
- Ricania lujai
- Ricania lukuluensis
- Ricania lurida
- Ricania lutescens
- Ricania malandae
- Ricania marginalis
- Ricania marginenotata
- Ricania minbuensis
- Ricania mitescens
- Ricania moluccana
- Ricania morula
- Ricania nigra
- Ricania nigrita
- Ricania noctua
- Ricania obliqua
- Ricania papuana
- Ricania pedicellata
- Ricania plagiata
- Ricania plebeja
- Ricania protea
- Ricania quadrimaculata
- Ricania quinquefasciata
- Ricania quinquepunctata
- Ricania rubrifascia
- Ricania sigillata
- Ricania simulans
- Ricania sobrina
- Ricania speculum
- Ricania striata
- Ricania stupida
- Ricania suasa
- Ricania subacta
- Ricania subglauca
- Ricania sutteri
- Ricania taeniata
- Ricania tisiphone
- Ricania trifasciata
- Ricania venustula
- Ricania zebra
- Ricania zigzac
