= Říčany (Brno-Country District) =

- Municipality
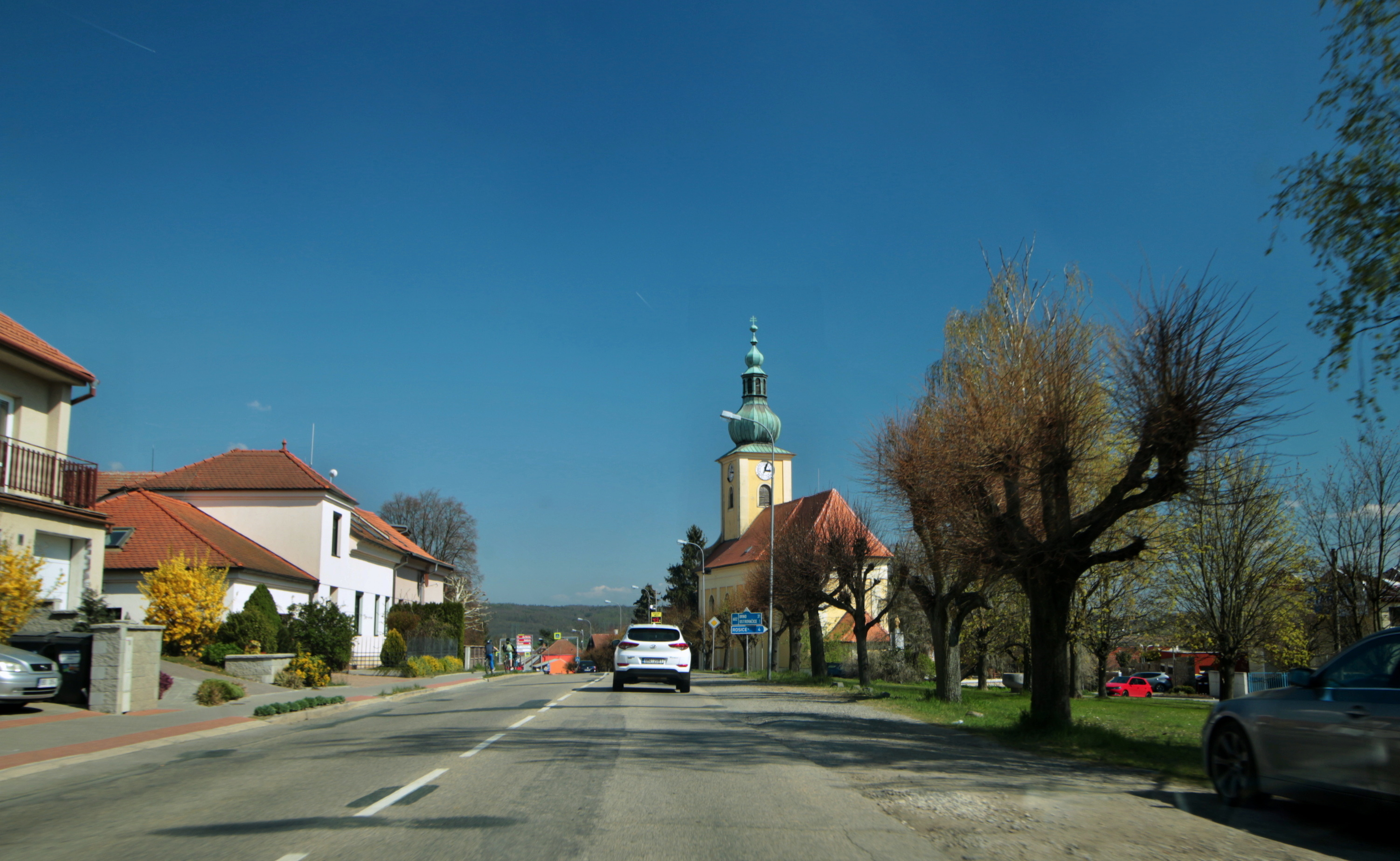
- Centre with the Church of Saints Peter and Paul

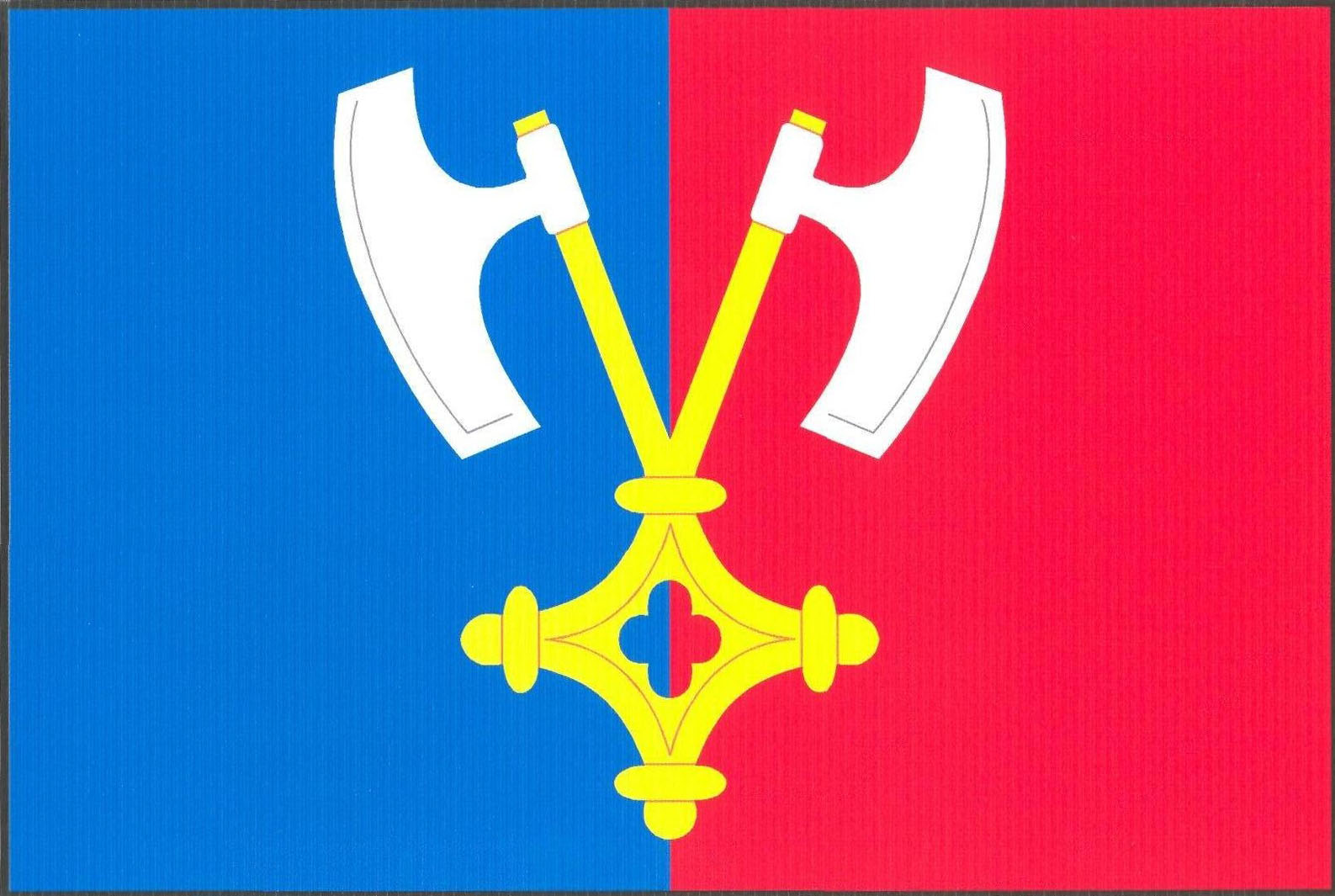
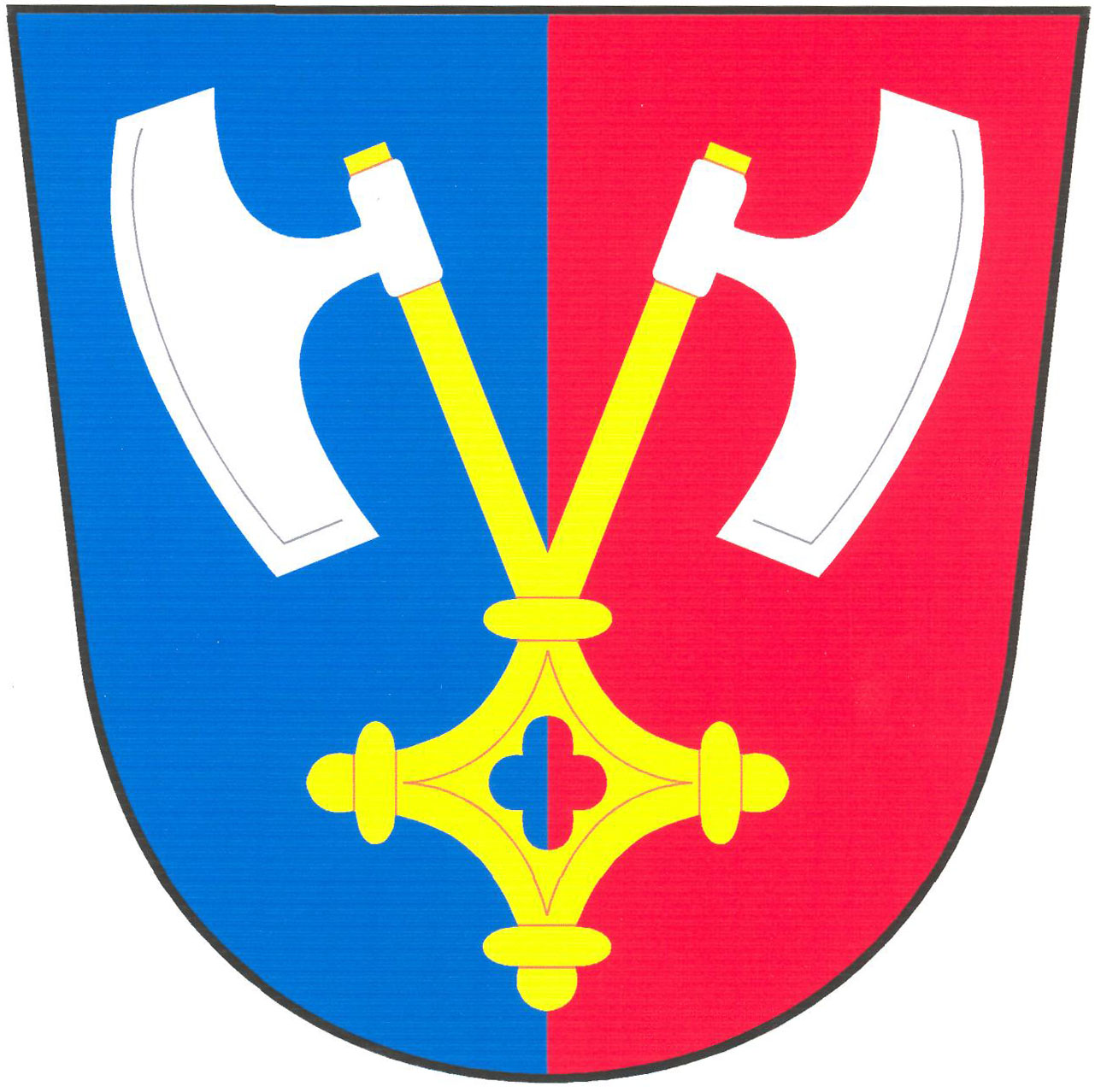
- Flag Coat of arms

- Location in the Czech Republic
- Coordinates: 49°12′54″N 16°23′37″E
- Country: Czech Republic
- Region: South Moravian
- District: Brno-Country
- First mentioned: 1237

Area
  - Total: 10.93 km^{2} (4.22 sq mi)
- Elevation: 345 m (1,132 ft)

Population (2026-01-01)
  - Total: 2,153
  - Density: 197.0/km^{2} (510.2/sq mi)
- Time zone: UTC+1 (CET)
  - Summer (DST): UTC+2 (CEST)
- Postal code: 664 82
- Website: www.ricanyubrna.cz

Říčany is a municipality and village in Brno-Country District in the South Moravian Region of the Czech Republic. It has about 2,200 inhabitants.

== Geography ==
Říčany is located about 14 kilometres (9 mi) west of Brno. It lies on the border between the Boskovice Furrow and Křižanov Highlands. The highest point is the hill Doubravky at 457 m (1,499 ft) above sea level. The stream Říčanský potok flows through the municipality.

== History ==
The first written mention of Říčany is in a deed of King Wenceslaus I from 1237. The village was owned by a local noble family, who called themselves the Lords of Říčany. In the 16th century at the latest, Říčany ceased to be a separate estate and was annexed to the Veveří estate.

== Demographics ==
Historical population

Year	Pop.	±%
1869	1,061	—
1880	1,108	+4.4%
1890	1,164	+5.1%
1900	1,471	+26.4%
1910	1,520	+3.3%

Year	Pop.	±%
1921	1,614	+6.2%
1930	1,698	+5.2%
1950	1,631	−3.9%
1961	1,655	+1.5%
1970	1,612	−2.6%

Year	Pop.	±%
1980	1,715	+6.4%
1991	1,658	−3.3%
2001	1,671	+0.8%
2011	1,925	+15.2%
2021	2,074	+7.7%

Source: Censuses

== Transport ==
The D1 motorway from Prague to Brno runs through the northern part of the municipality.

== Sights ==
The main landmark of Říčany is the Church of Saints Peter and Paul. It was built in the late Baroque style in 1754–1763.
