= Battle of Pharsalus (disambiguation) =

The Battle of Pharsalus was a decisive battle of the Roman civil wars, fought in 48 BC between Julius Caesar and Pompey.

Battle of Pharsalus, Pharsala or Farsala may also refer to:

- Battle of Pharsalus (1277), between a Byzantine army and the ruler of Thessaly, John Doukas
- Battle of Farsala, between the Greeks and the Ottomans in the Greco-Turkish War (1897)
