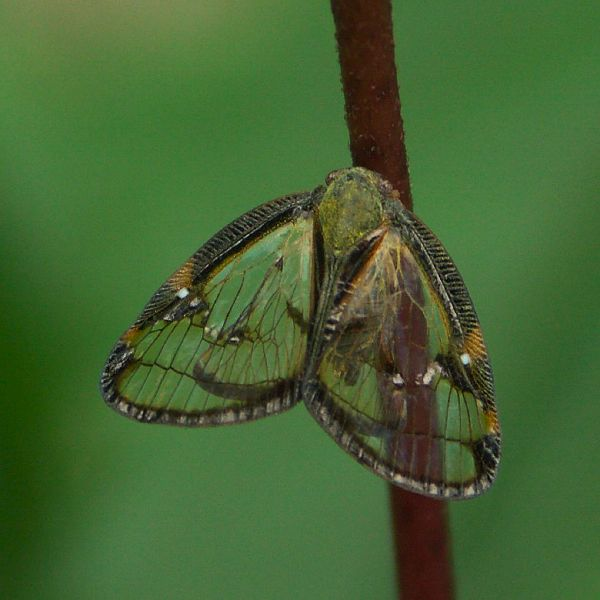
- Euricania facialis adult

Scientific classification
- Kingdom: Animalia
- Phylum: Arthropoda
- Clade: Pancrustacea
- Class: Insecta
- Order: Hemiptera
- Suborder: Auchenorrhyncha
- Infraorder: Fulgoromorpha
- Superfamily: Fulgoroidea
- Family: Ricaniidae; Amyot & Audinet-Serville, 1843

= Ricaniidae =

Family of true bugs

Ricaniidae is a family of planthoppers, containing over 400 species worldwide. The highest diversity is in tropical Africa and Asia and in Australia, with a few species occurring in the Palearctic and Neotropical realms. It is one of the smaller families in the planthopper superfamily Fulgoroidea.

== Subfamilies and genera ==
As of 2022, Fulgoromorpha Lists on the Web includes:

=== Subfamily Pharsalinae Gnezdilov, 2009 ===
(Neotropical - all presently monotypic)

- Pharsalus Melichar, 1906
- Ricamela Gnezdilov, 2019
- Silvanana Metcalf, 1947

=== Subfamily Ricaniinae Amyot & Audinet-Serville, 1843 ===
- Acroprivesa Schmidt, 1912
- Alisca Stål, 1870
- Aliscella Fennah, 1969
- Apachnas Distant, 1909
- Aprivesa Melichar, 1923
- Armacia Stål, 1862
- Armilustrium Distant, 1917
- Carmentalia Distant, 1917
- Coniunctivena Stroinski, Gnezdilov & Bourgoin, 2011
- Cotrades Walker, 1858
- Cyamosa Stroinski, Gnezdilov & Bourgoin, 2011
- Deferundata Distant, 1917
- Deraulax Signoret, 1860
- Epitemna Melichar, 1898
- Epithalamium Kirkaldy, 1906
- Euricania Melichar, 1898
- Globularica Stroinski, Gnezdilov & Bourgoin, 2011
- Hajar Kirkaldy, 1905
- Isobium Melichar, 1906
- Janssensia Lallemand, 1950
- Kazukuru Stroinski, 2021
- Keiserana Synave, 1966
- Kruegeria Schmidt, 1911
- Lambertoniana Dmitriev, 2020
- Lugardia Distant, 1909
- Mahecania Stroinski, 2013
- Marleyia Distant, 1909
- Meliprivesa Metcalf, 1952
- Mesoricania Melichar, 1923
- Motua Distant, 1909
- Motumotua Distant, 1909
- Mulvia Stål, 1866
- Nasatus Stroinski, Gnezdilov & Bourgoin, 2011
- Neoprivesa Distant, 1917
- Nesomimas Fennah, 1971
- Orosanga Fennah, 1971
- Osaka Distant, 1909
- Paici Stroinski, 2010
- Parapiromis Bu, Larivière & Liang, 2010
- Paurostauria Kirby, 1900
- Plestia Stål, 1870
- Pocharica Signoret, 1860
- Pocharista Melichar, 1923
- Pochazia Amyot & Audinet-Serville, 1843
- Pochazina Melichar, 1898
- Pochazoides Signoret, 1860
- Privesa Stål, 1862
- Ricania Germar, 1818 - type genus
- Ricanoides Zia, 1935
- Ricanopsis Melichar, 1898
- Ricanoptera Melichar, 1898
- Ricanula Melichar, 1898
- Scolypopa Stål, 1859
- Scotinax Fennah, 1969
- Semestra Jacobi, 1916
- Sensorica Stroinski, 2021
- Syndetica Bergroth, 1920
- Tarehylava Stroinski, 2021
- Tarundia Stål, 1859
- Trysanor Williams & Fennah, 1980

=== Subfamily incertae sedis ===
- Jeromicanus Stroinski, 2020
- Five extinct monotypic genera

== Gallery ==
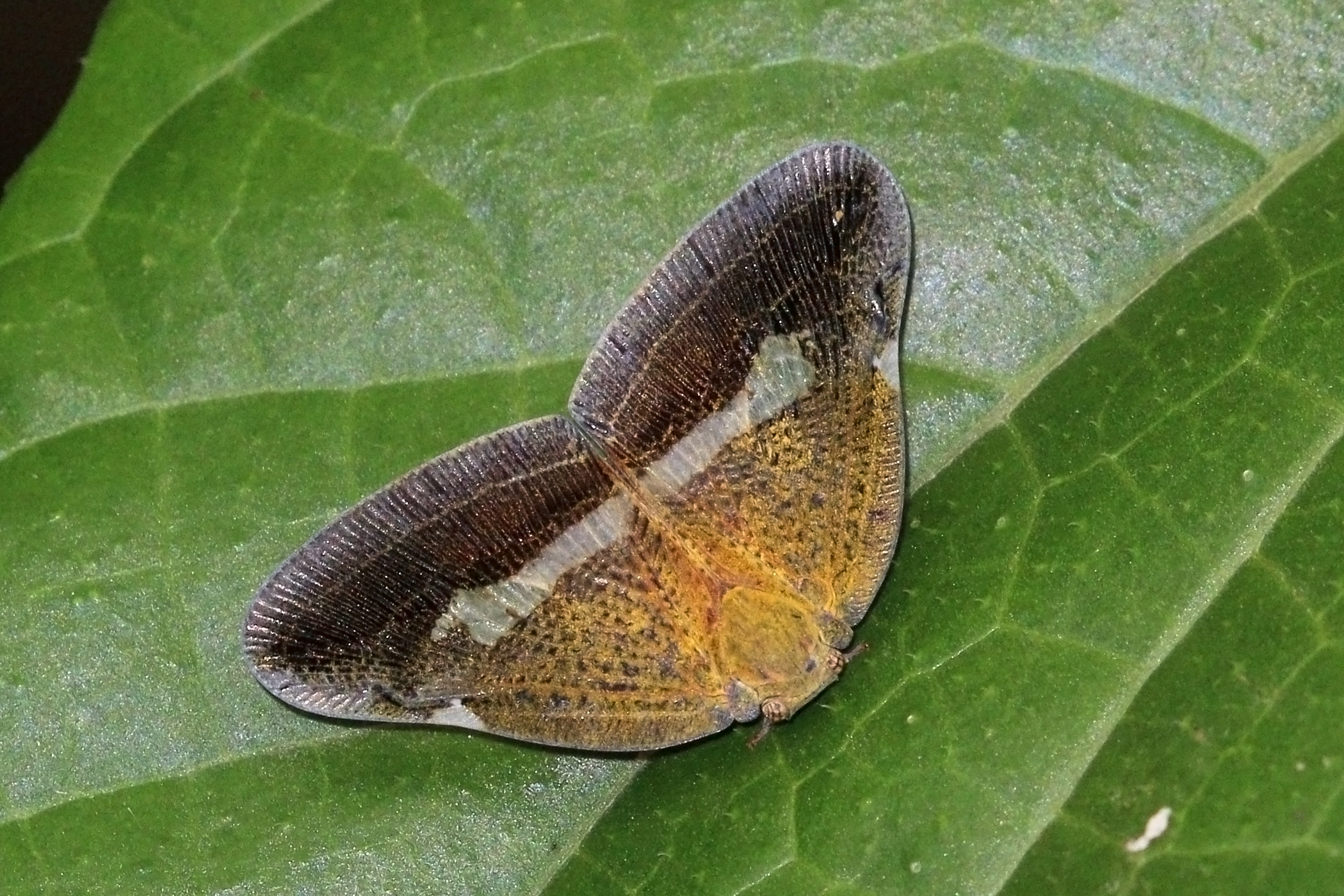
Pochazia fasciata, Ghana

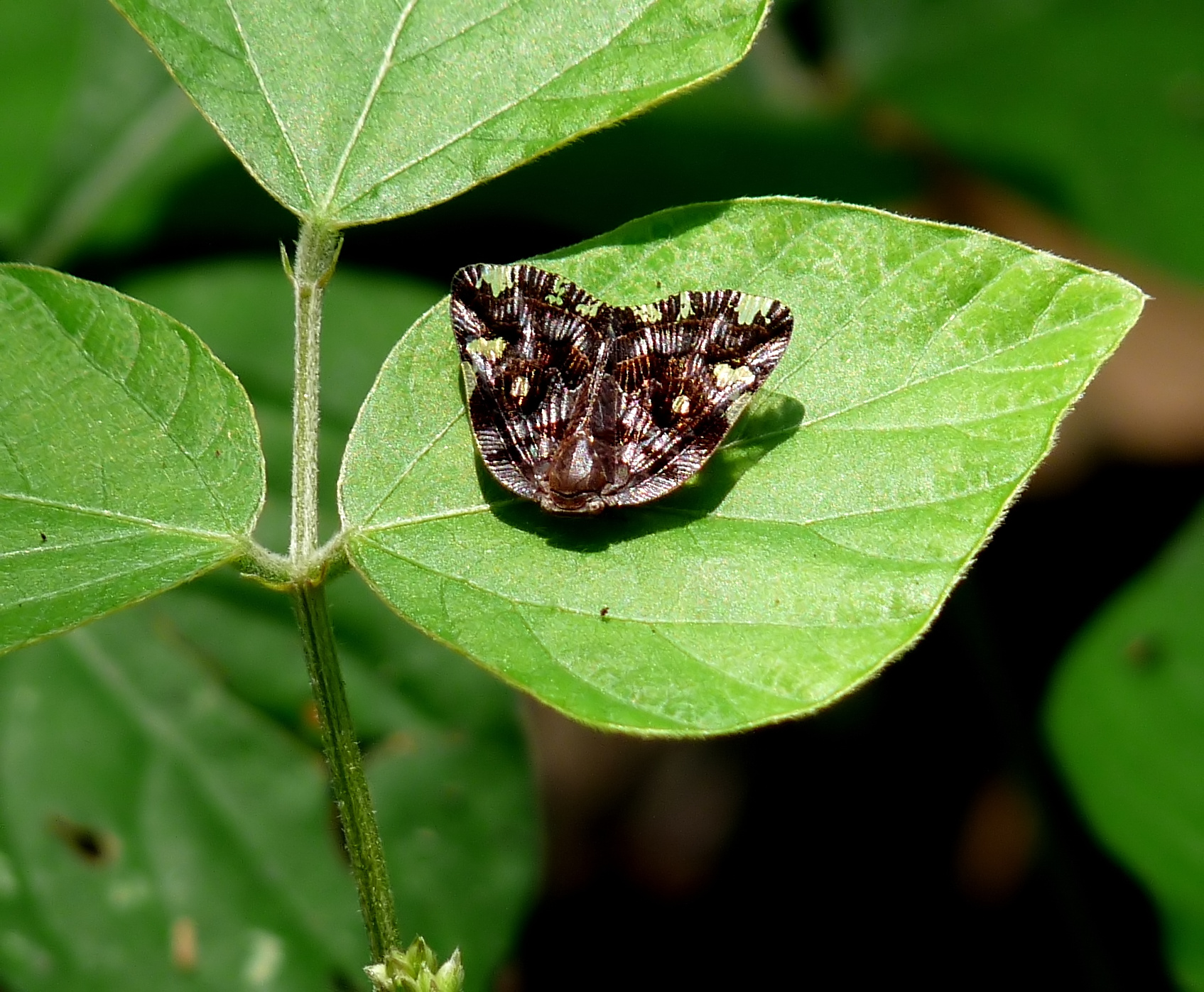
Ricania speculum, India

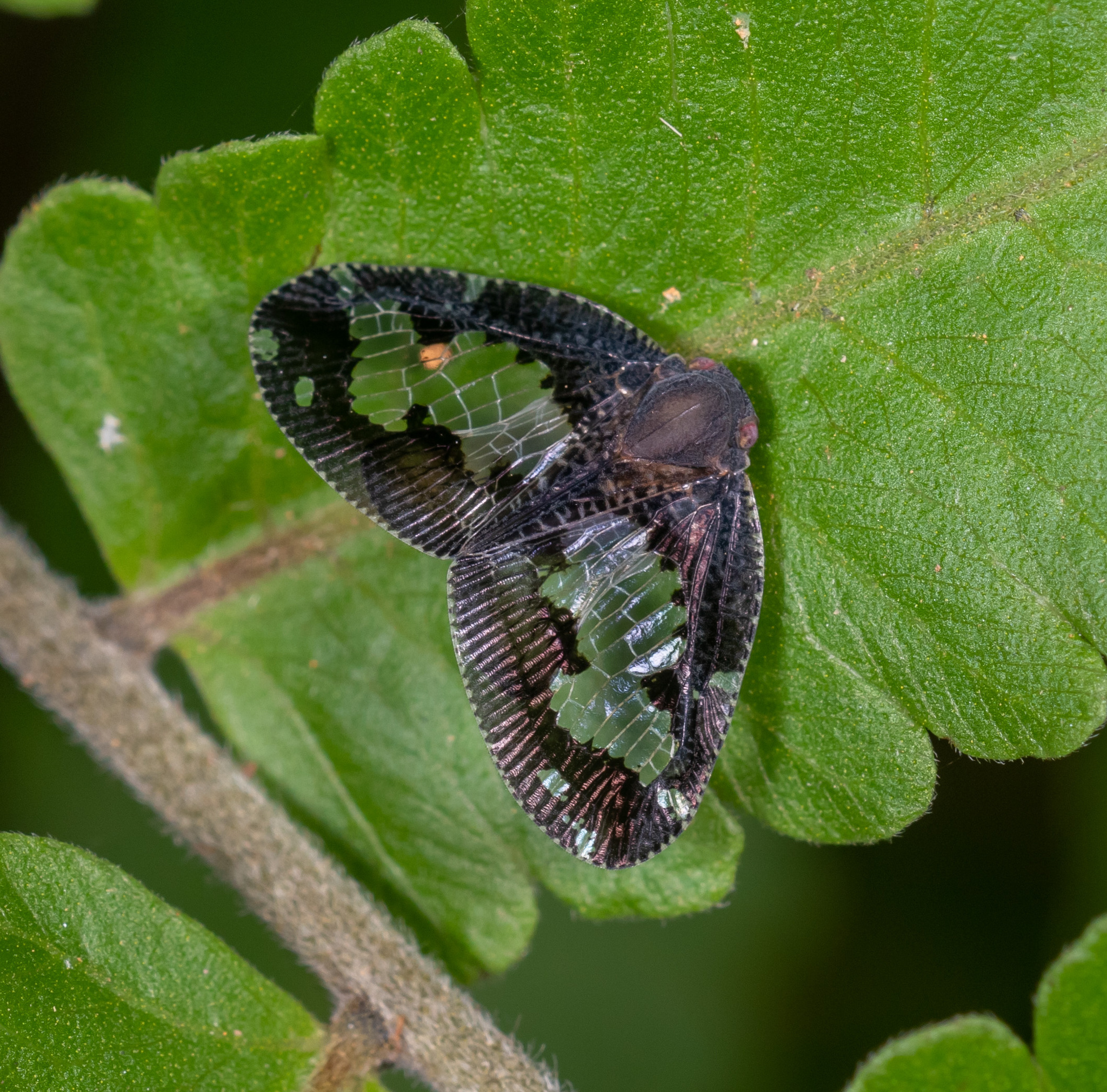
Ricanoptera fenestrata, Indonesia

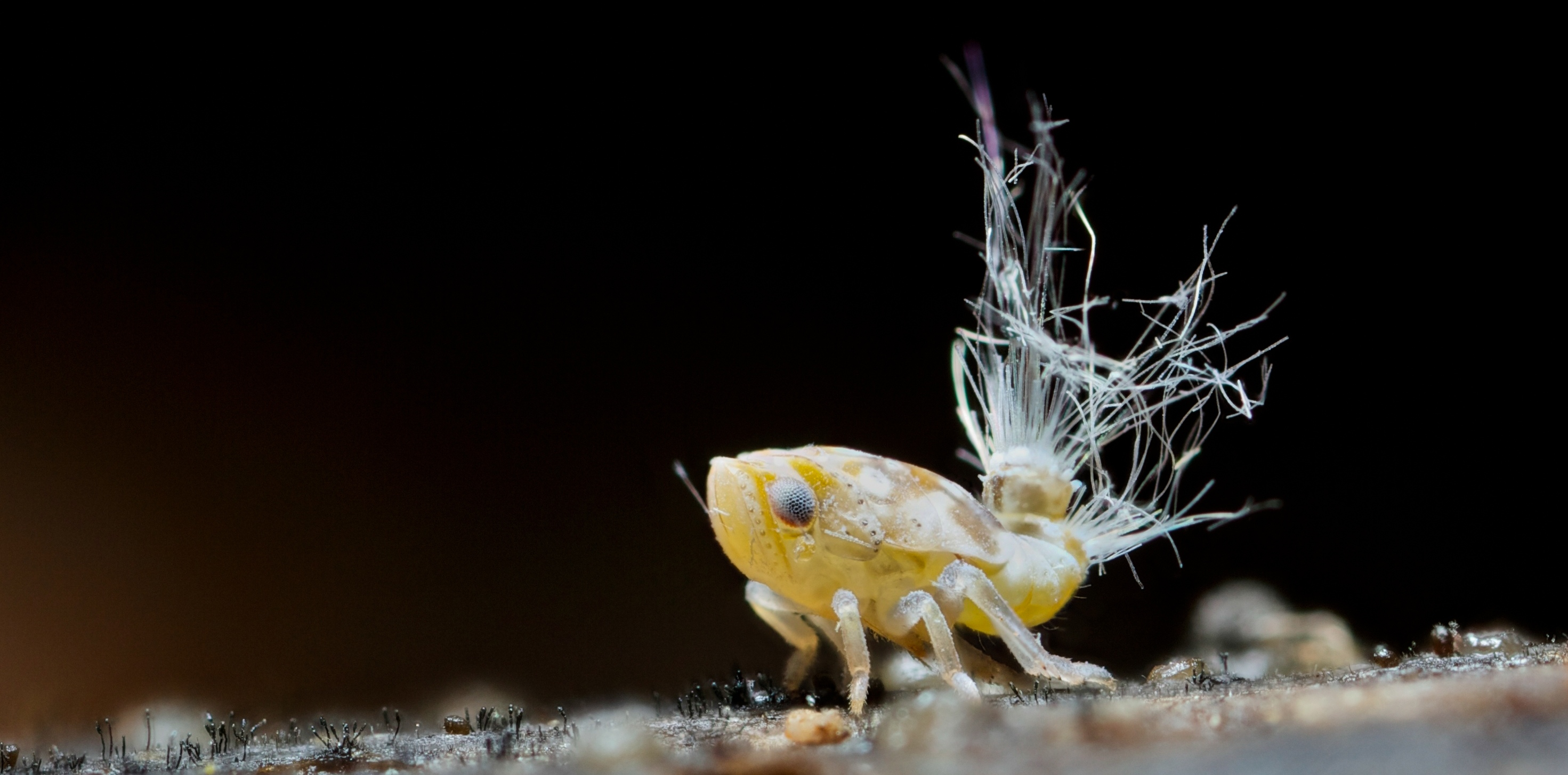
Scolypopa australis nymph
