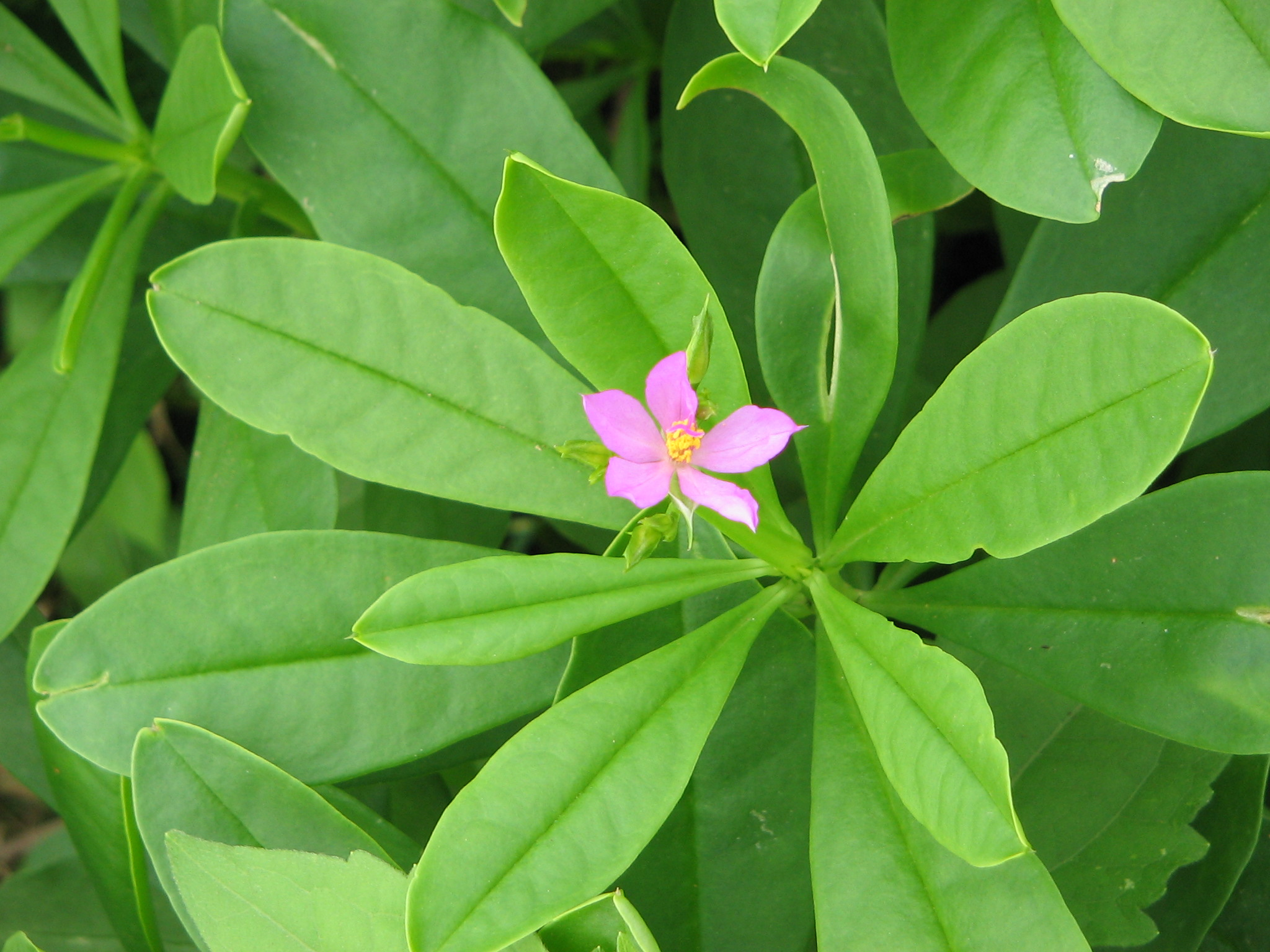
- Talinum fruticosum

Scientific classification
- Kingdom: Plantae
- Clade: Tracheophytes
- Clade: Angiosperms
- Clade: Eudicots
- Order: Caryophyllales
- Family: Talinaceae
- Genus: Talinum; Adans. (1763)

Species
- 27; See text

Synonyms
- Anacampseros P.Browne (1756), nom. illeg.; Chromanthus Phil. (1870); Eutmon Raf. (1833); Helianthemoides Medik. (1789); Orygia Forssk. (1775); Sabouraea Leandri (1962); Talinella Baill. (1886); Talinium Raf. (1818)

= Talinum =

Genus of flowering plants

Talinum is a genus of herbaceous succulent plants in the family Talinaceae (formerly in the family Portulacaceae) whose common names include fameflower. It includes 27 species native to tropical and subtropical regions of the Americas, sub-Saharan Africa, the Arabian Peninsula, Indian subcontinent, and Myanmar. Several species bear edible leaves, and Talinum fruticosum is widely grown in tropical regions as a leaf vegetable. Talinum paniculatum is grown as an ornamental plant.

== Species ==
27 species are accepted.

- Talinum albiflorum (Appleq.) Christenh. & Byng
- Talinum ankaranense (Appleq.) Christenh. & Byng
- Talinum arnotii Hook.f.
- Talinum aurantiacum Engelm.
- Talinum boivinianum (Baill.) Christenh. & Byng
- Talinum bosseri (Appleq.) Christenh. & Byng
- Talinum afrum (Thunb.) Eckl. & Zeyh.
- Talinum crispatulum Dinter
- Talinum dauphinense (Scott Elliot) Christenh. & Byng
- Talinum domingense Urb. & Ekman
- Talinum fruticosum (L.) Juss.
- Talinum grevei (Danguy) Christenh. & Byng
- Talinum humbertii (Appleq.) Christenh. & Byng
- Talinum latifolium (Appleq.) Christenh. & Byng
- Talinum lineare Kunth
- Talinum microphyllum (Eggli) Christenh. & Byng
- Talinum nocturnum Bacig.
- Talinum pachypodum (Eggli) Christenh. & Byng
- Talinum paniculatum (Jacq.) Gaertn.
- Talinum polygaloides Gillies ex Arn.
- Talinum porphyreum M.Mend. & J.R.I.Wood
- Talinum portulacifolium (Forssk.) Asch. ex Schweinf.
- Talinum sonorae D.J.Ferguson
- Talinum tenuissimum Dinter
- Talinum tsitondroinense (Appleq.) Christenh. & Byng
- Talinum tuberosum (Benth.) P.Wilson
- Talinum xerophilum (Appleq.) Christenh. & Byng

=== Formerly placed here ===
- Calandrinia ciliata (Ruiz & Pav.) DC. (as T. ciliatum Ruiz & Pav)
- Phemeranthus calcaricus (S. Ware)
- Phemeranthus mengesii (W.Wolf) Kiger (as T. mengesii W.Wolf)
- Phemeranthus parviflorus (Nutt.) Kiger (as T. parviflorum Nutt.)
- Lewisia pygmaea (A.Gray) B.L.Rob. (as T. pygmaeum A.Gray)
- Phemeranthus rugospermus (Holz.) Kiger (as T. rugospermum Holz.)
- Phemeranthus spinescens (Torr.) Hershk. (as T. spinescens Torr.)
- Montiopsis umbellata (Ruiz & Pav.) D.I.Ford (as T. umbellatum Ruiz & Pav.)

== Gallery ==
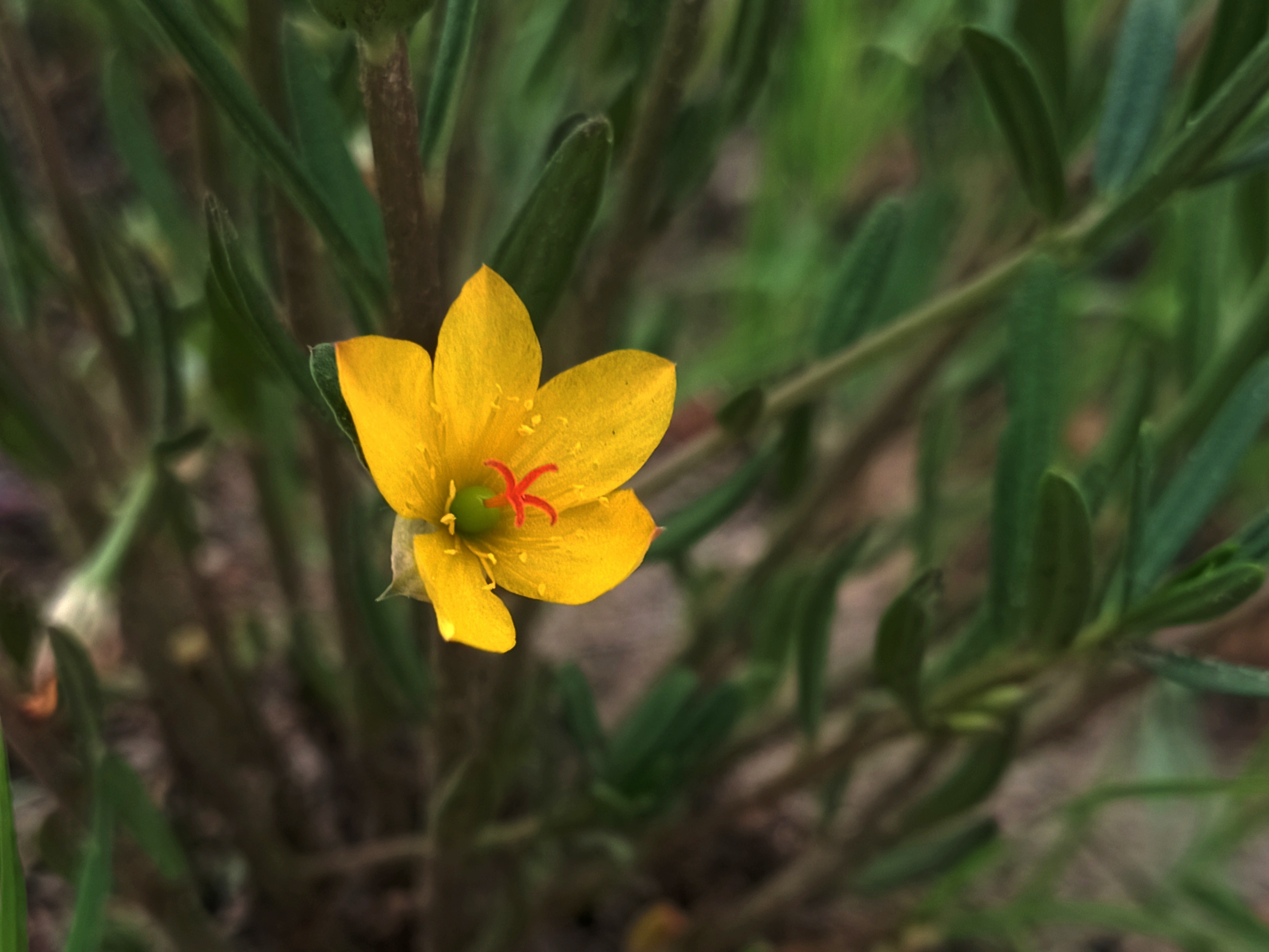
Talinum aurantiacum

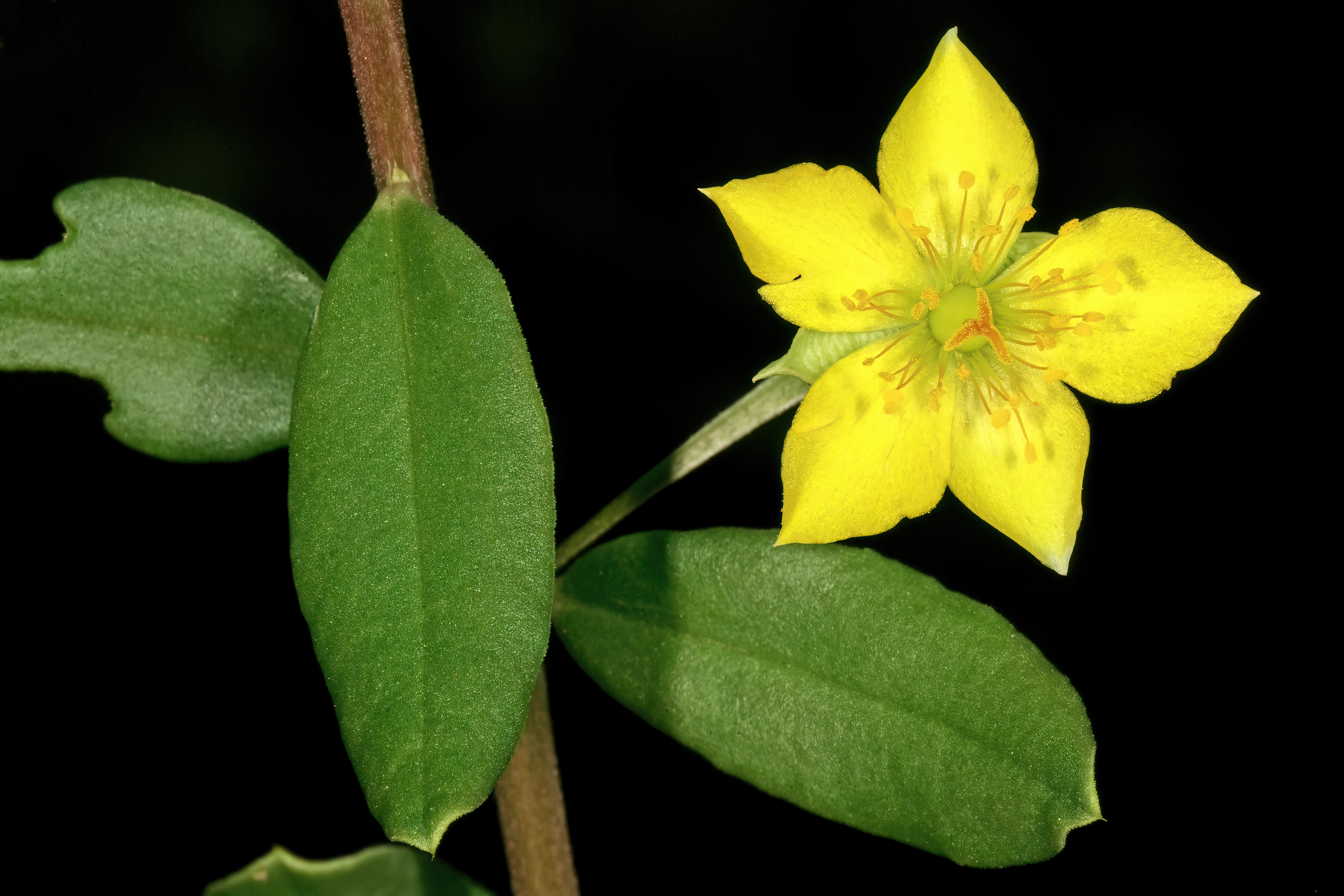
Talinum caffrum

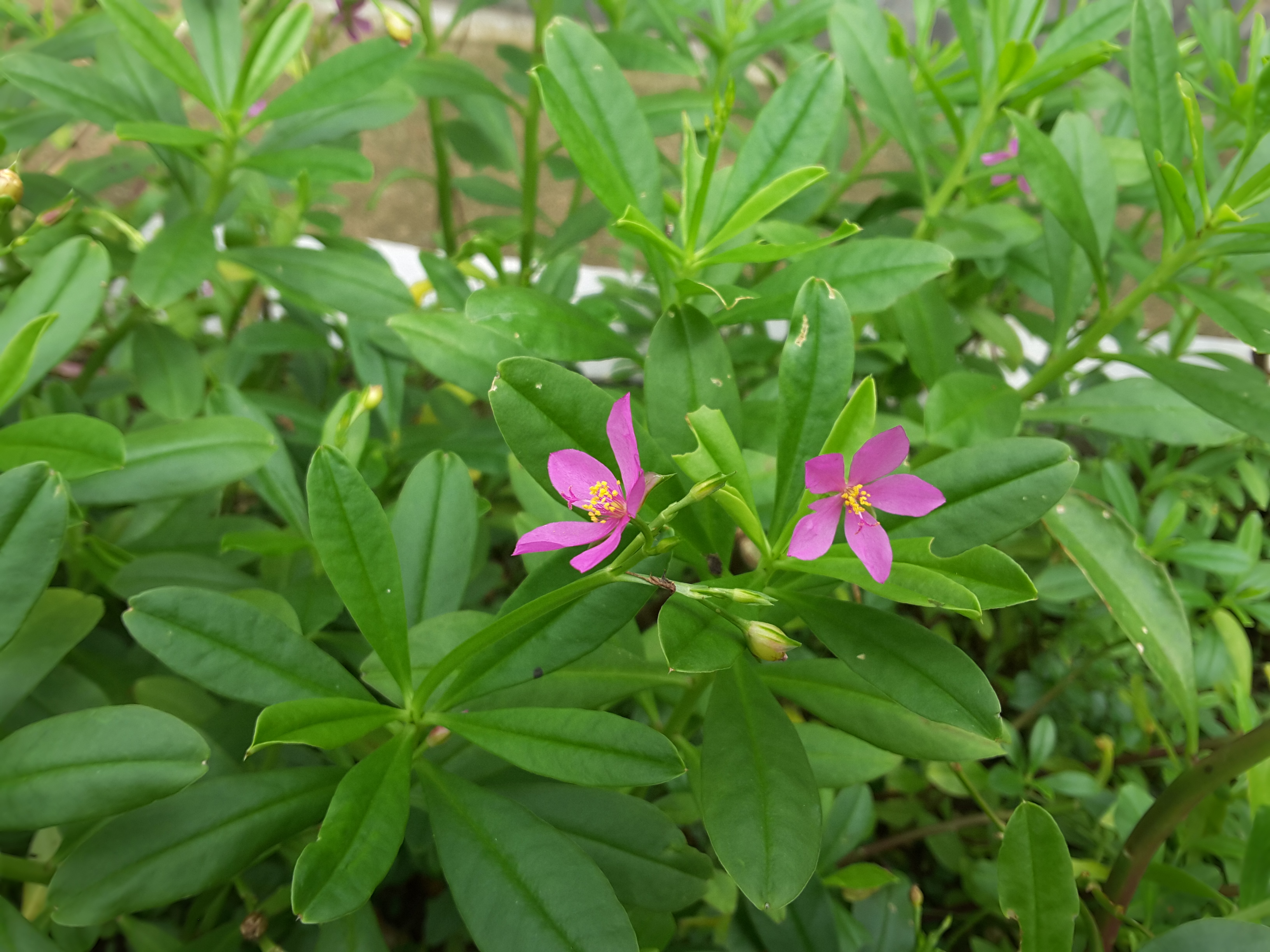
Talinum fruticosum

Talinum lineare

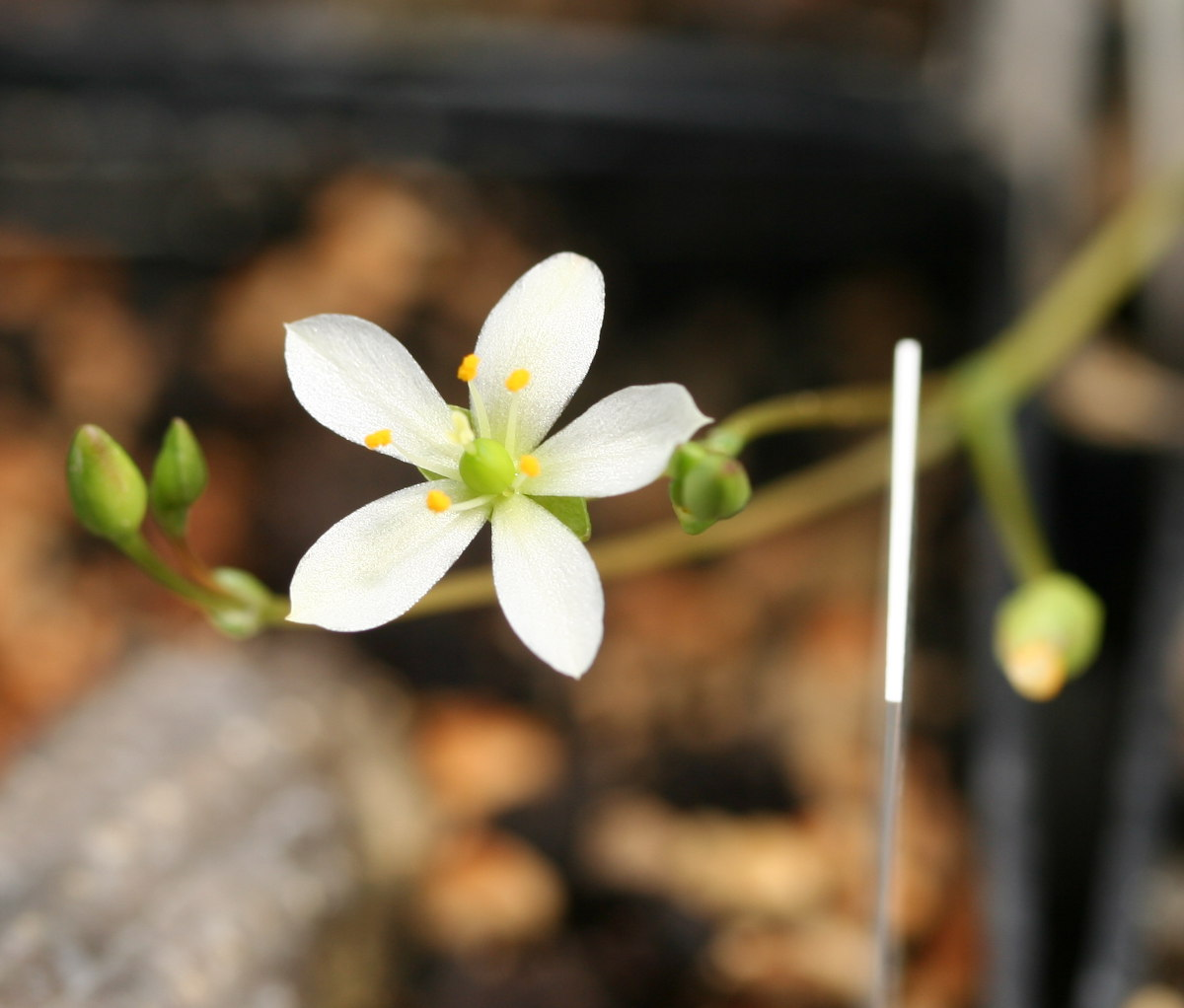
Talinum napiforme

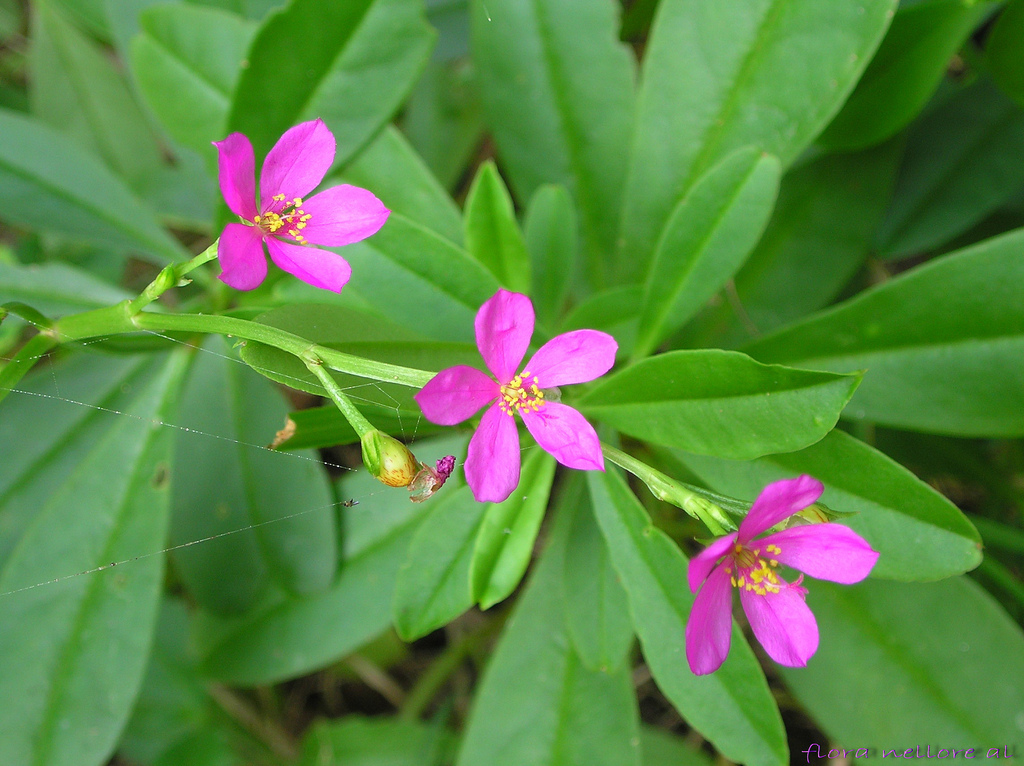
Talinum paniculatum

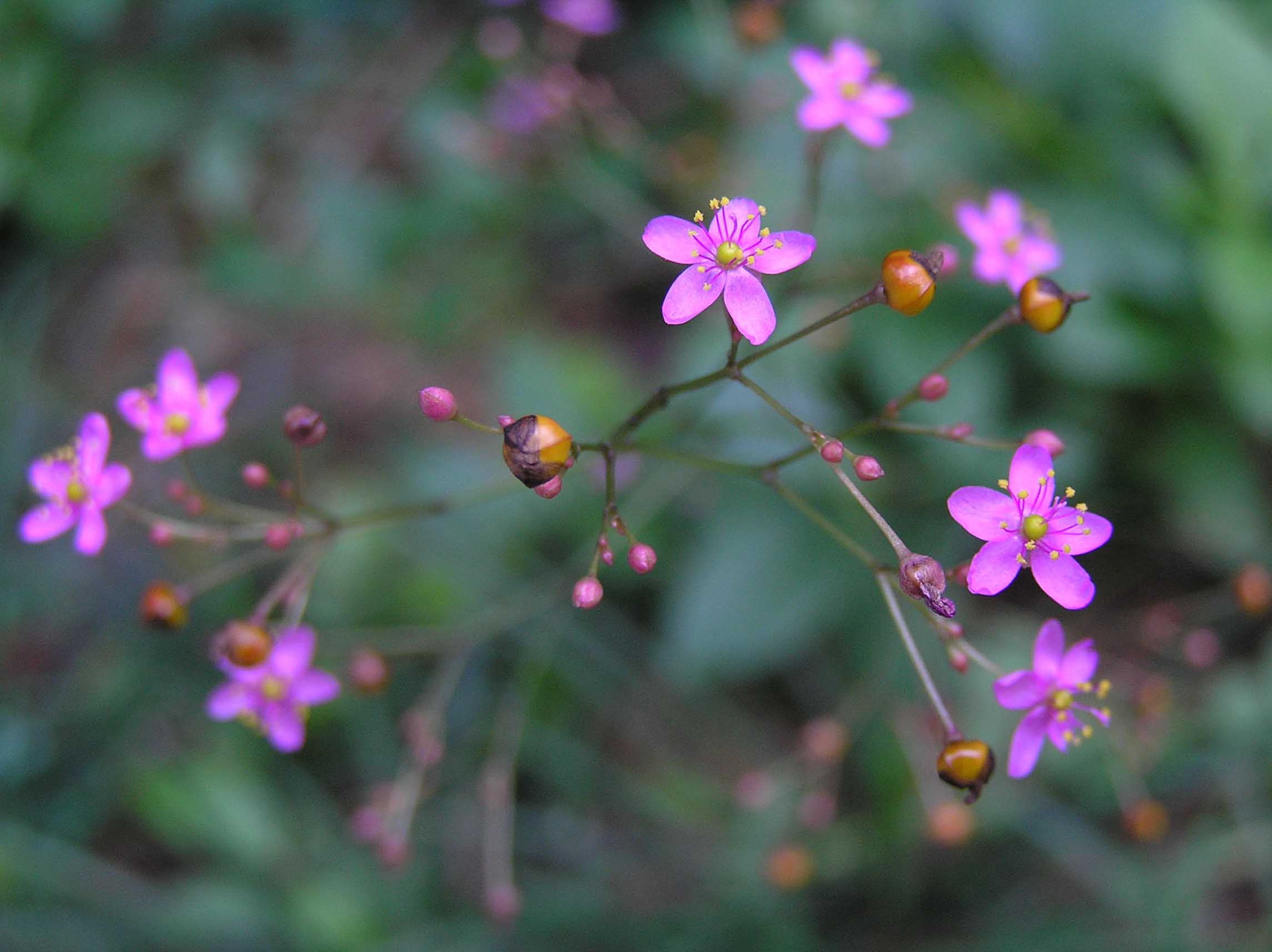
Talinum patens

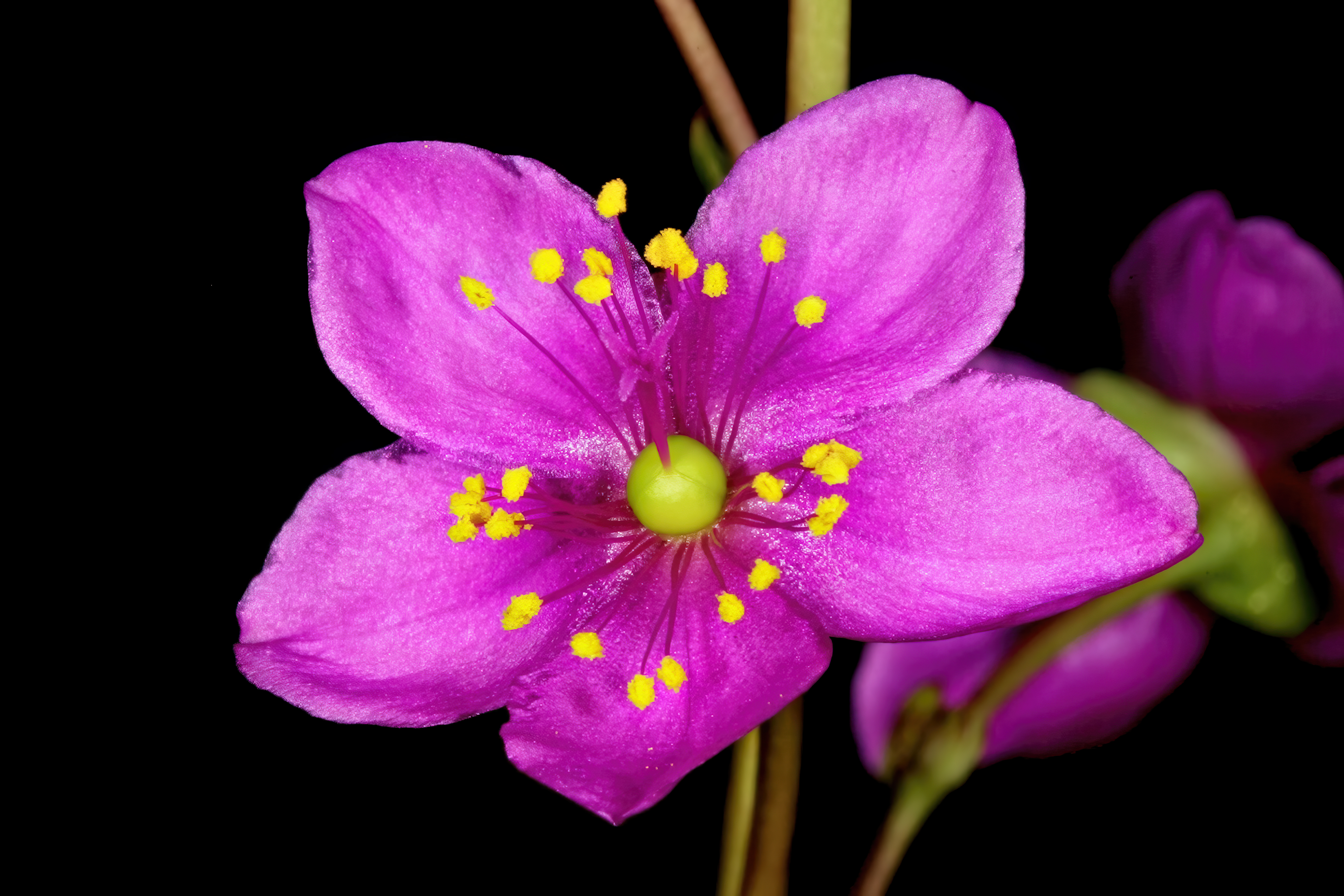
Talinum portulacifolium

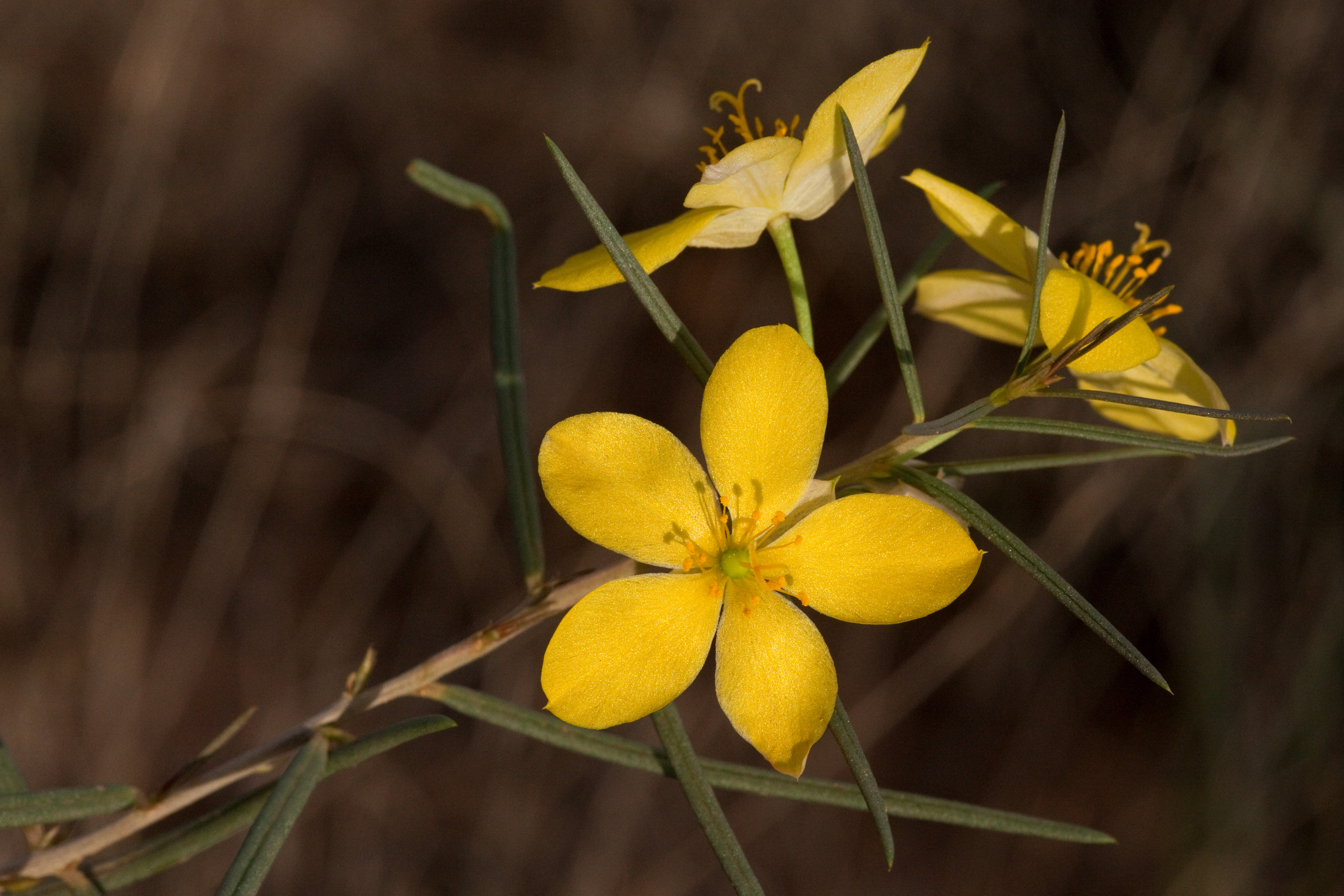
Talinum polygaloides

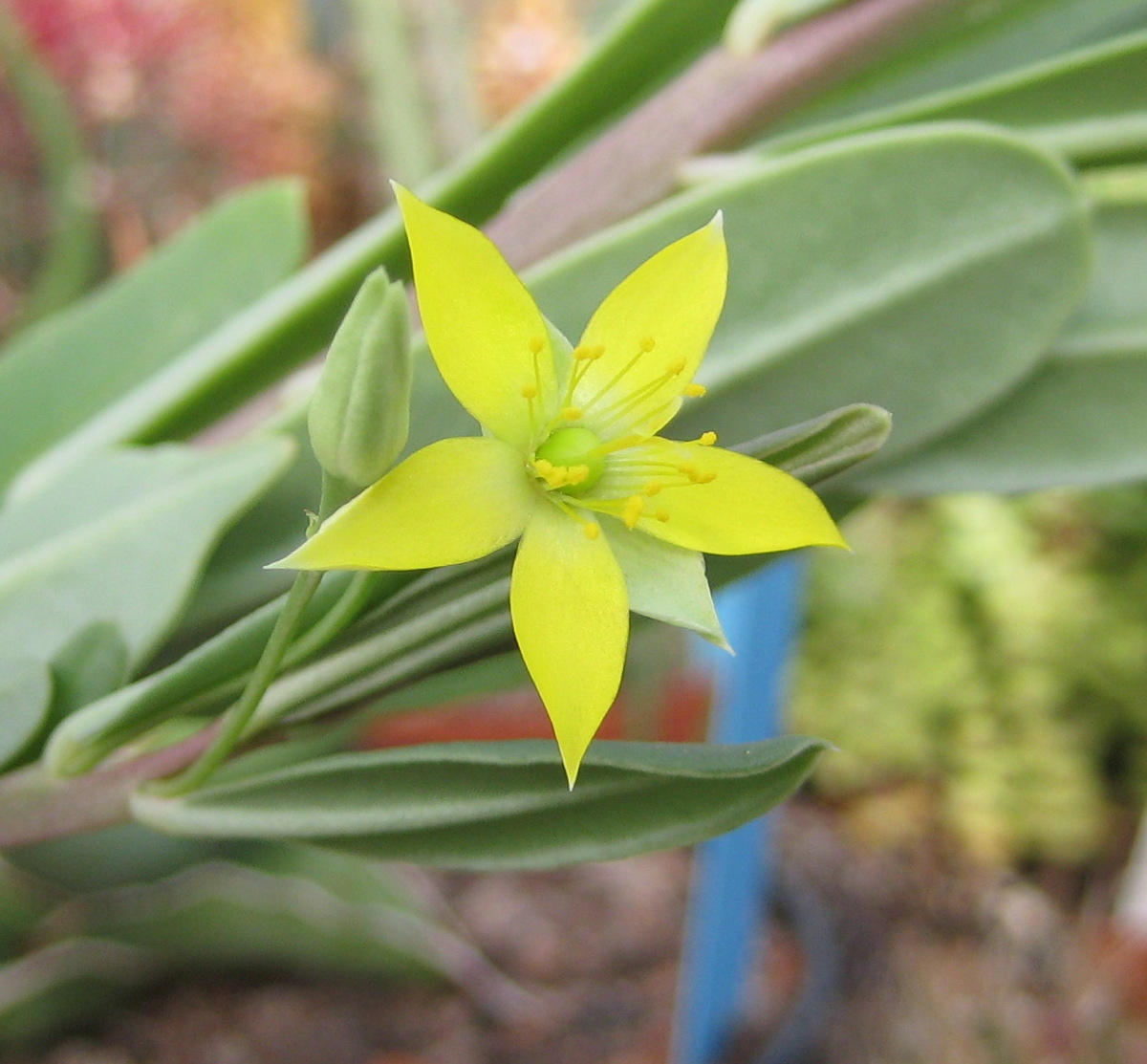
Talinum tenuissimum
