= Fameflower =

Fameflower is a common name for several flowering plants in different families in order Caryophyllales, and may refer to:

- Phemeranthus, native to the Americas
- Talinum
Plants named Fameflower
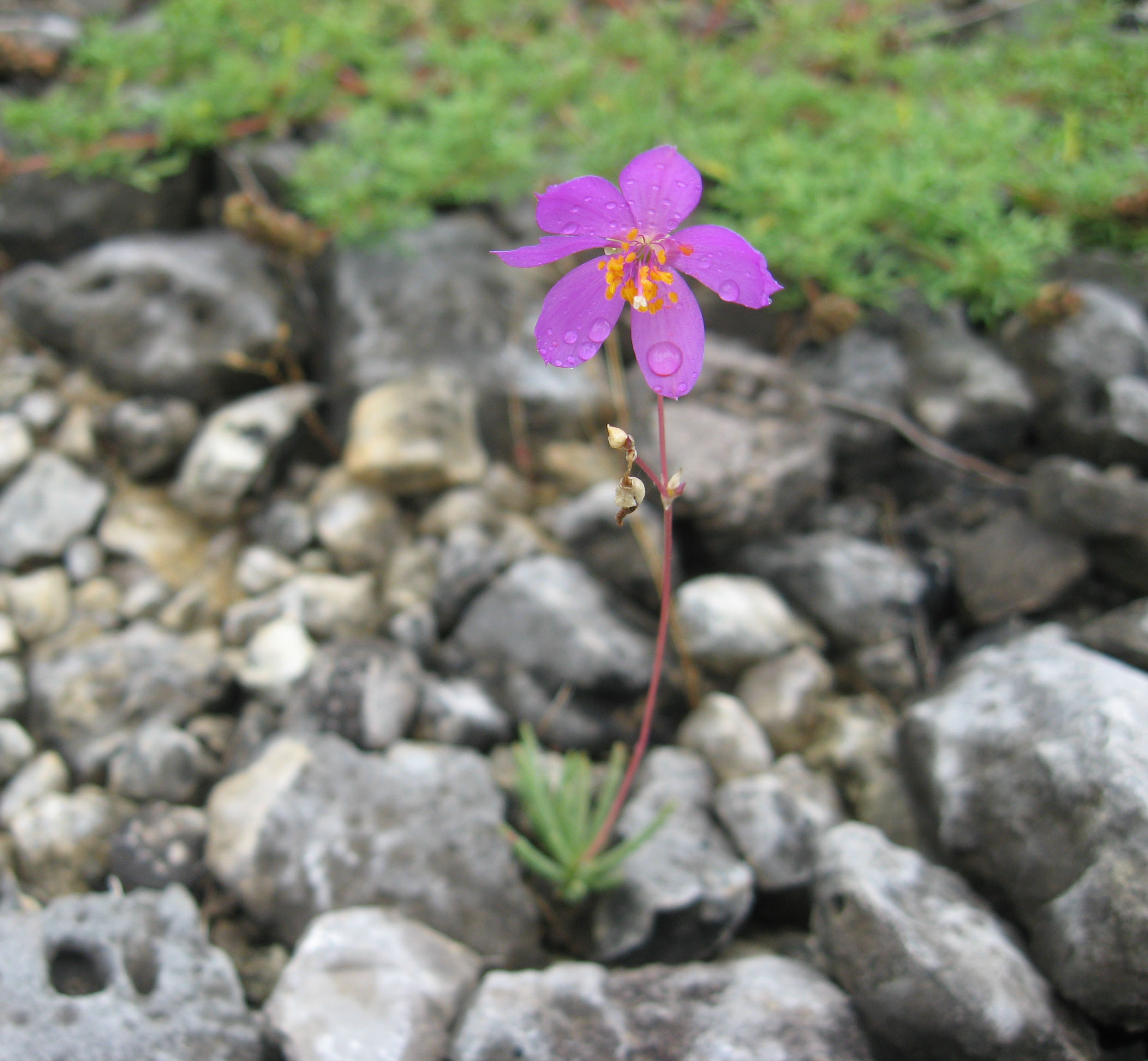
Phemeranthus calcaricus, limestone fameflower

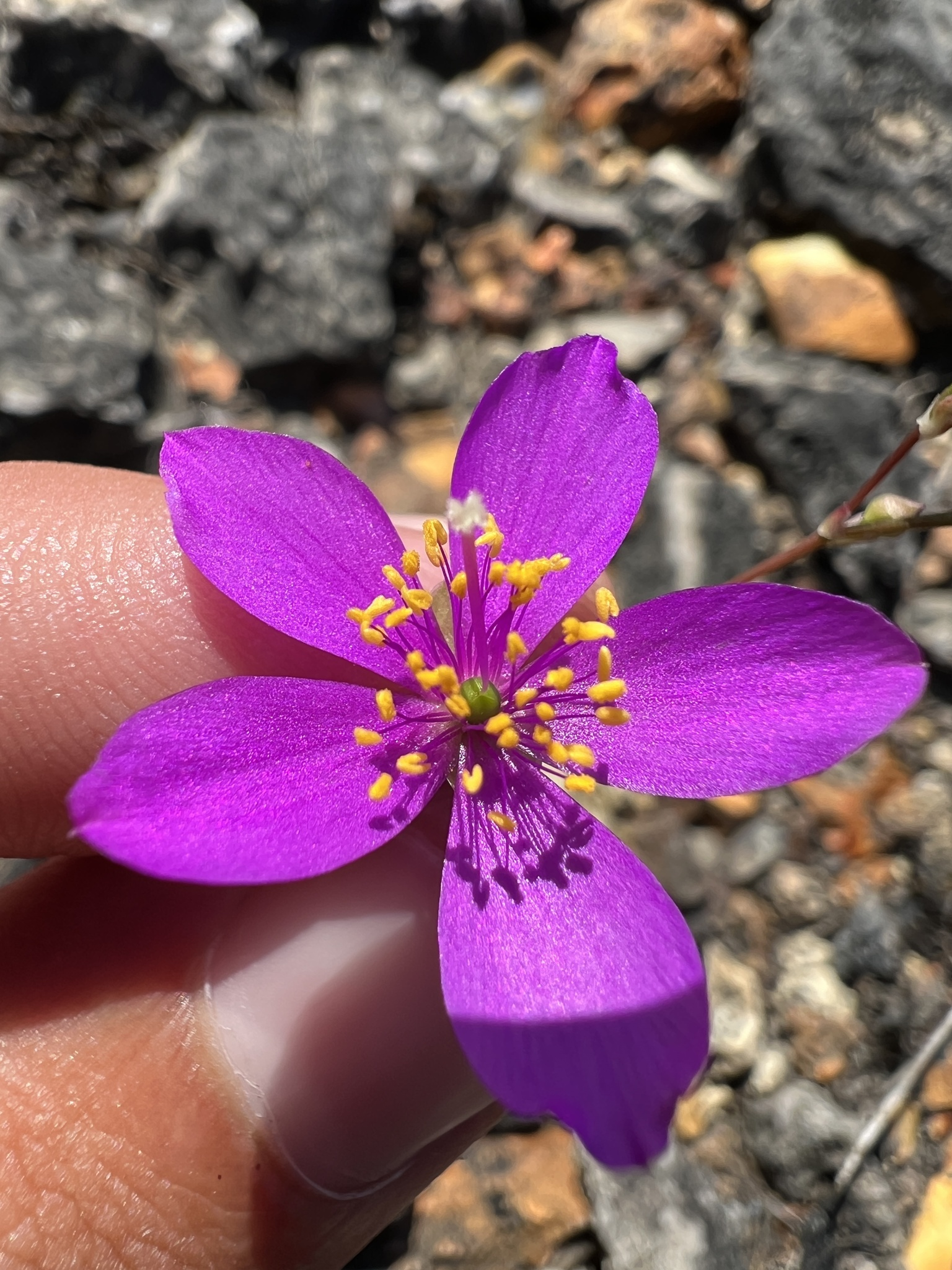
Phemeranthus calycinus, largeflower fameflower

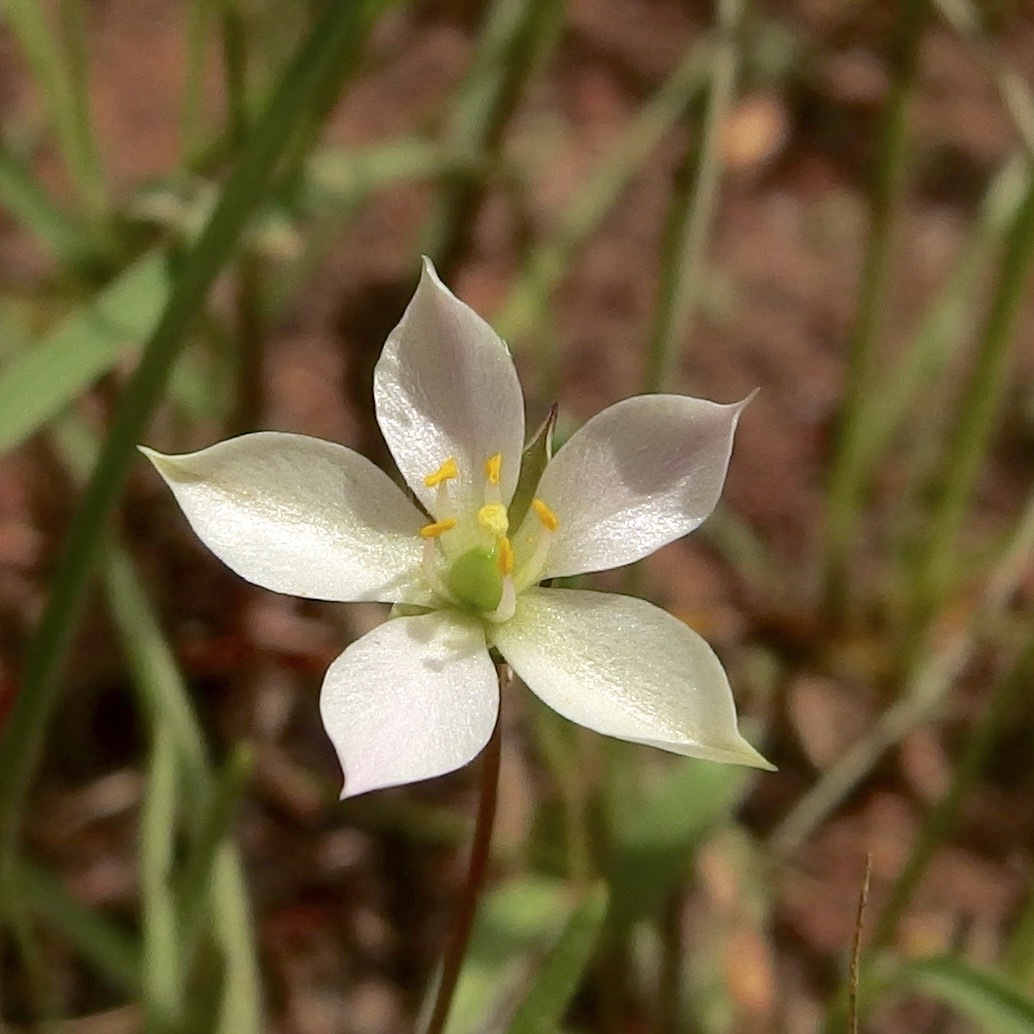
Phemeranthus confertiflorus, New Mexico fameflower

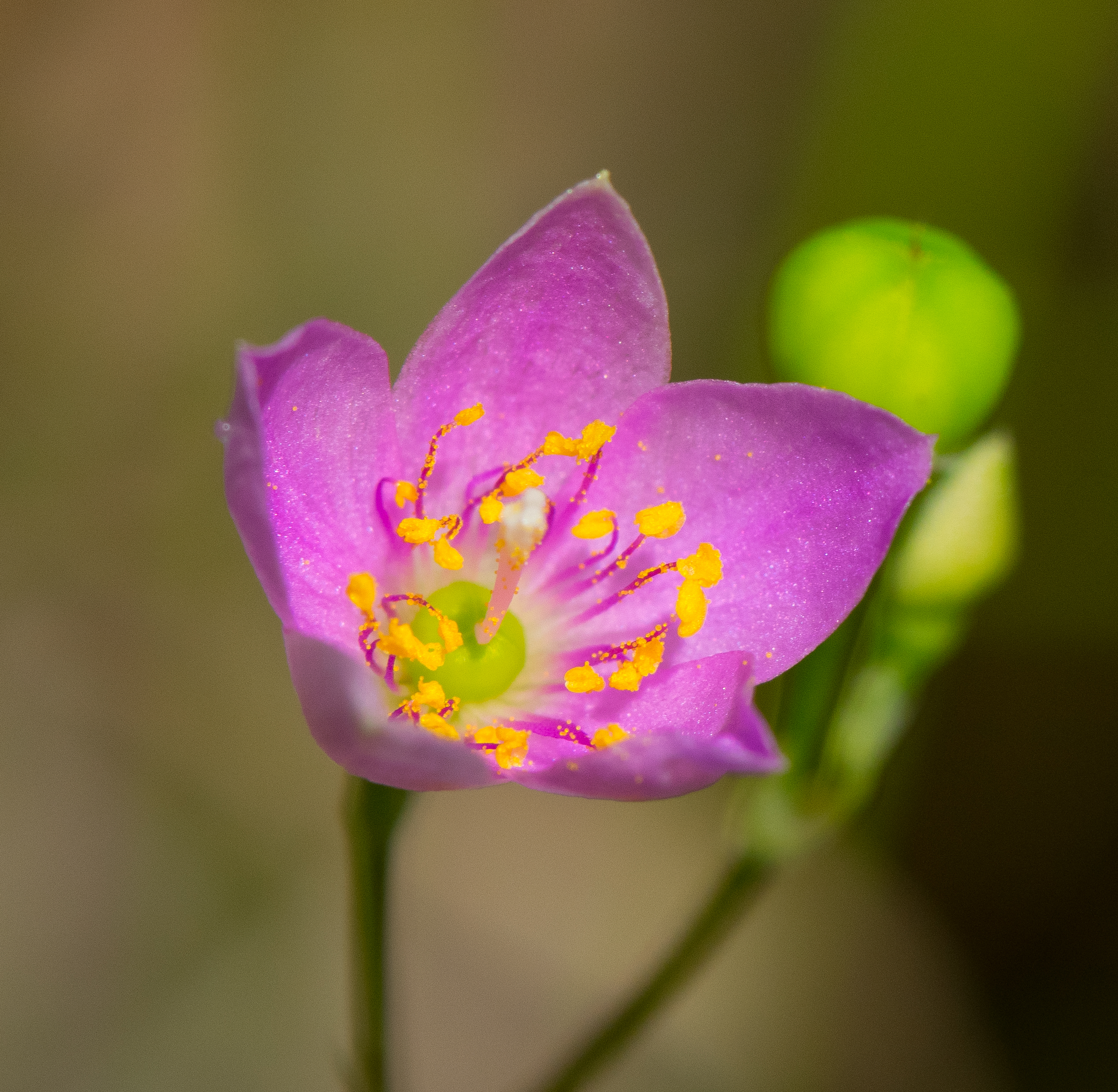
Phemeranthus rugospermus, prairie fameflower

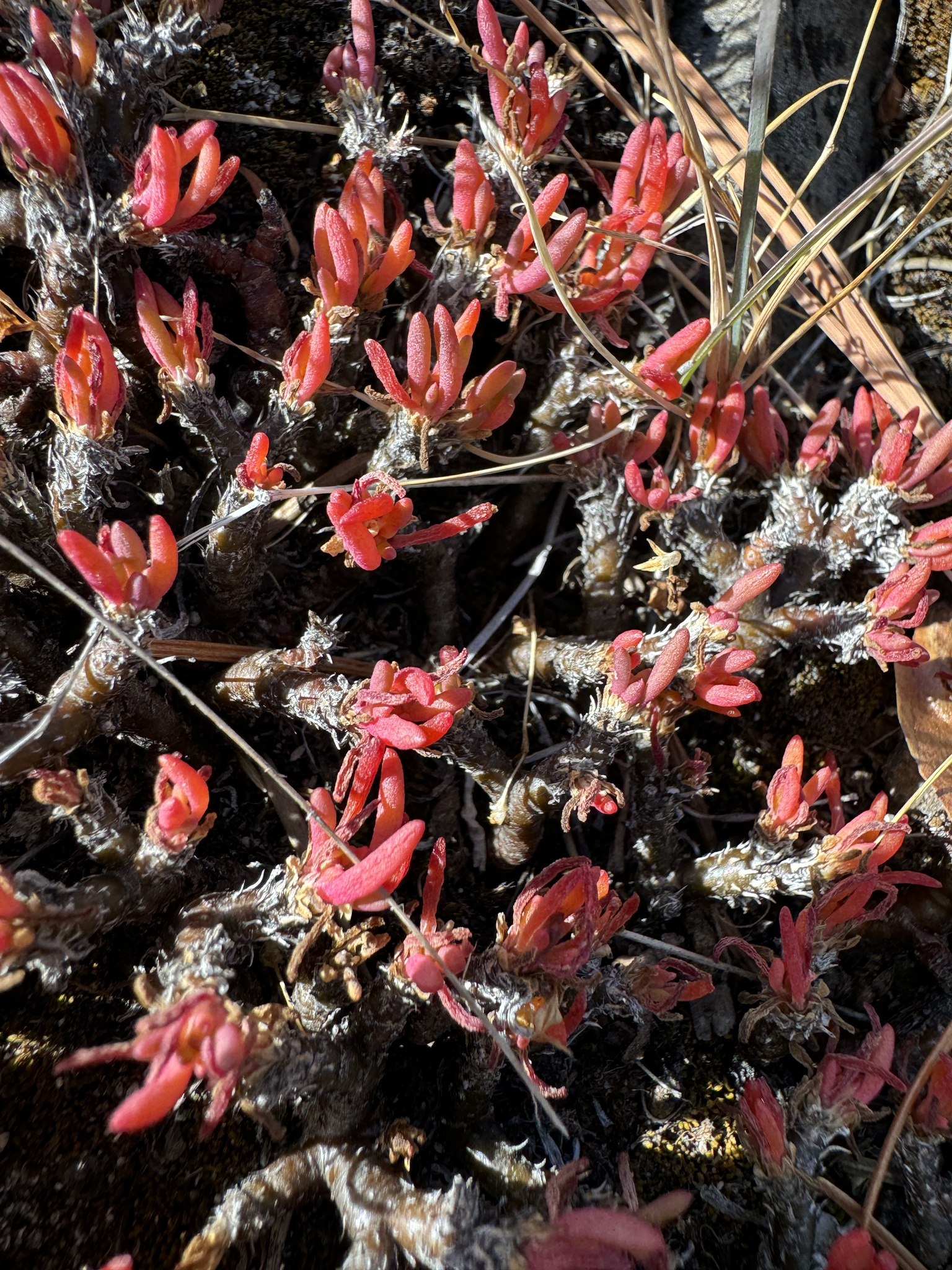
Phemeranthus spinescens, spiny fameflower

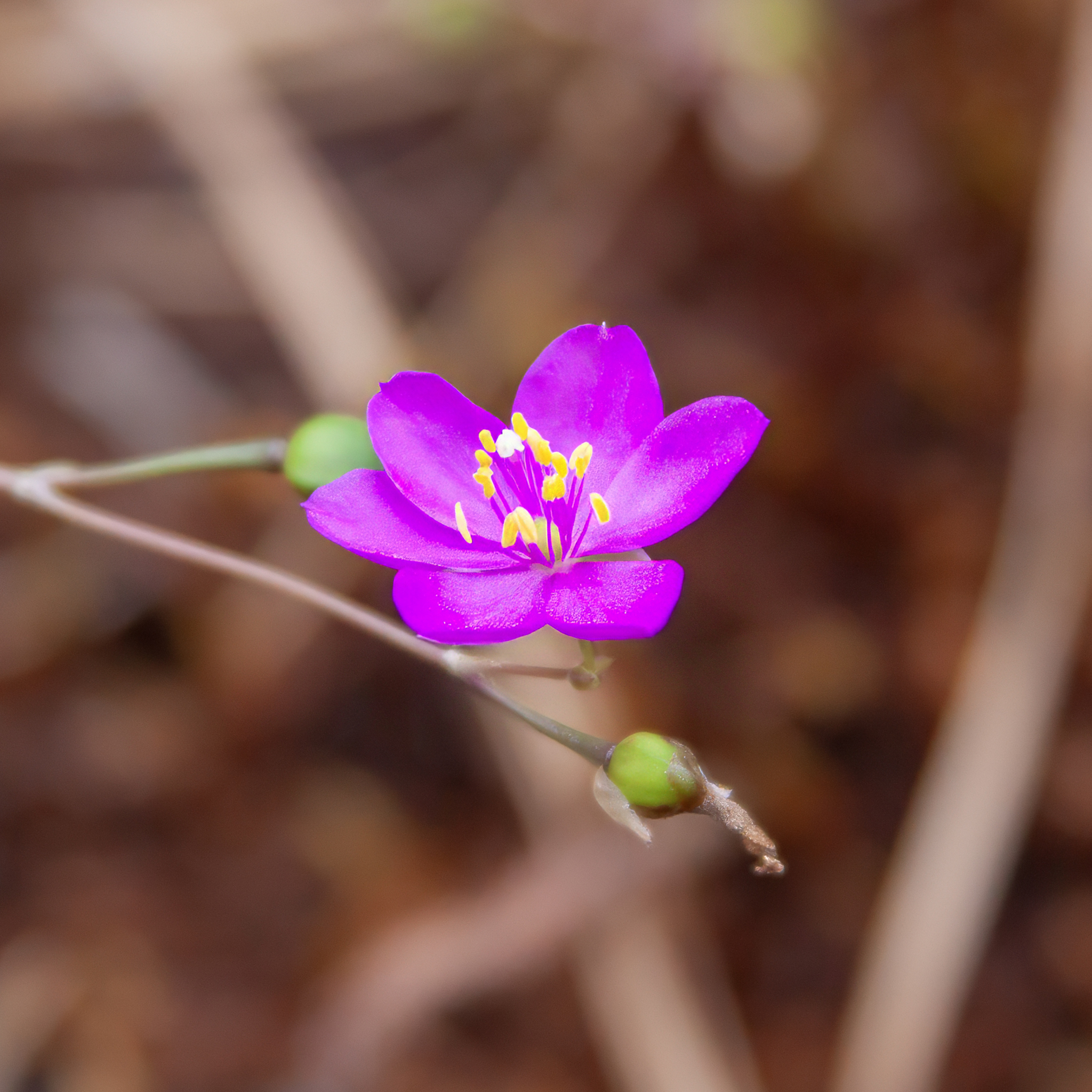
Phemeranthus teretifolius, quill fameflower

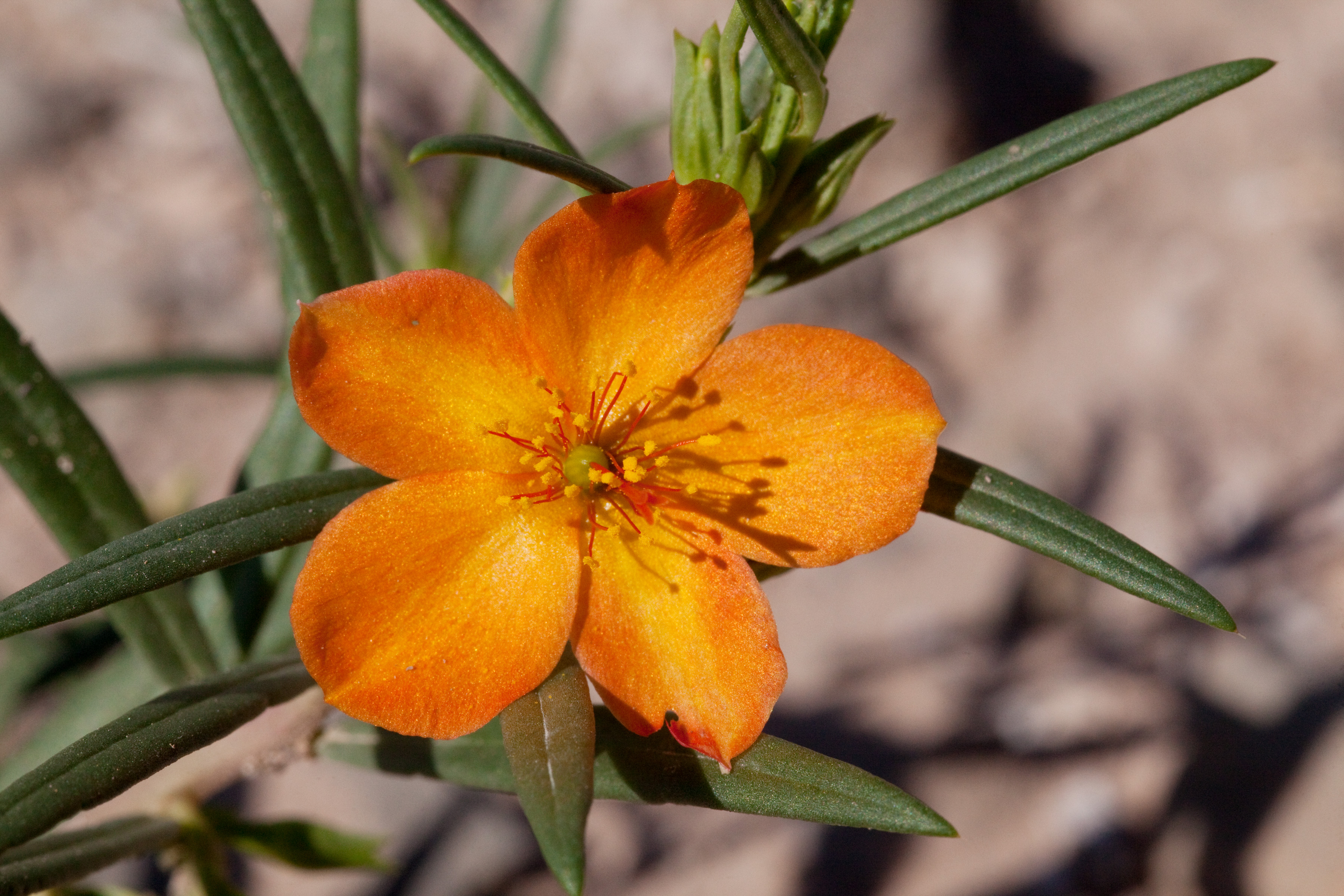
Talinum aurantiacum, orange fameflower

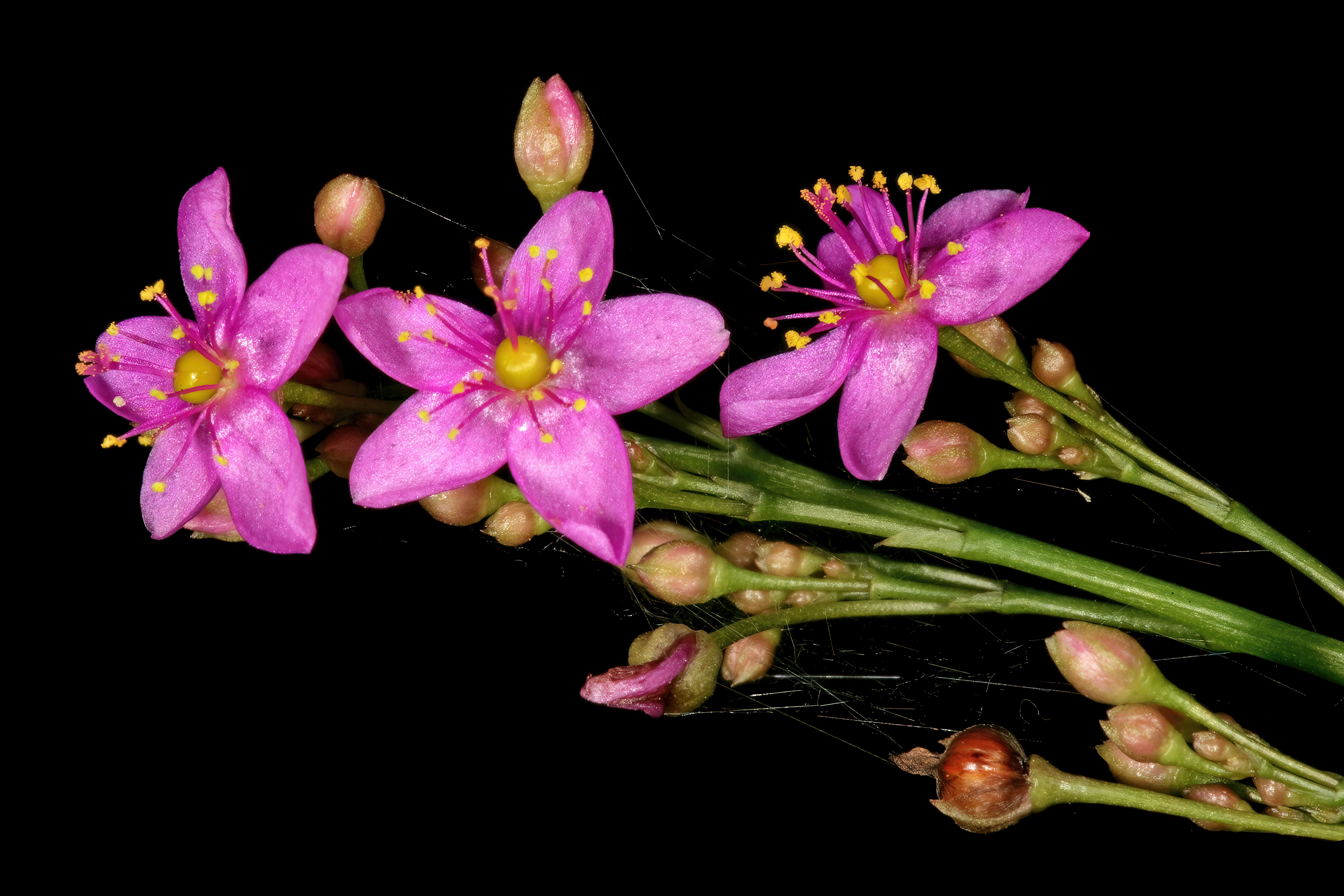
Talinum paniculatum, fameflower

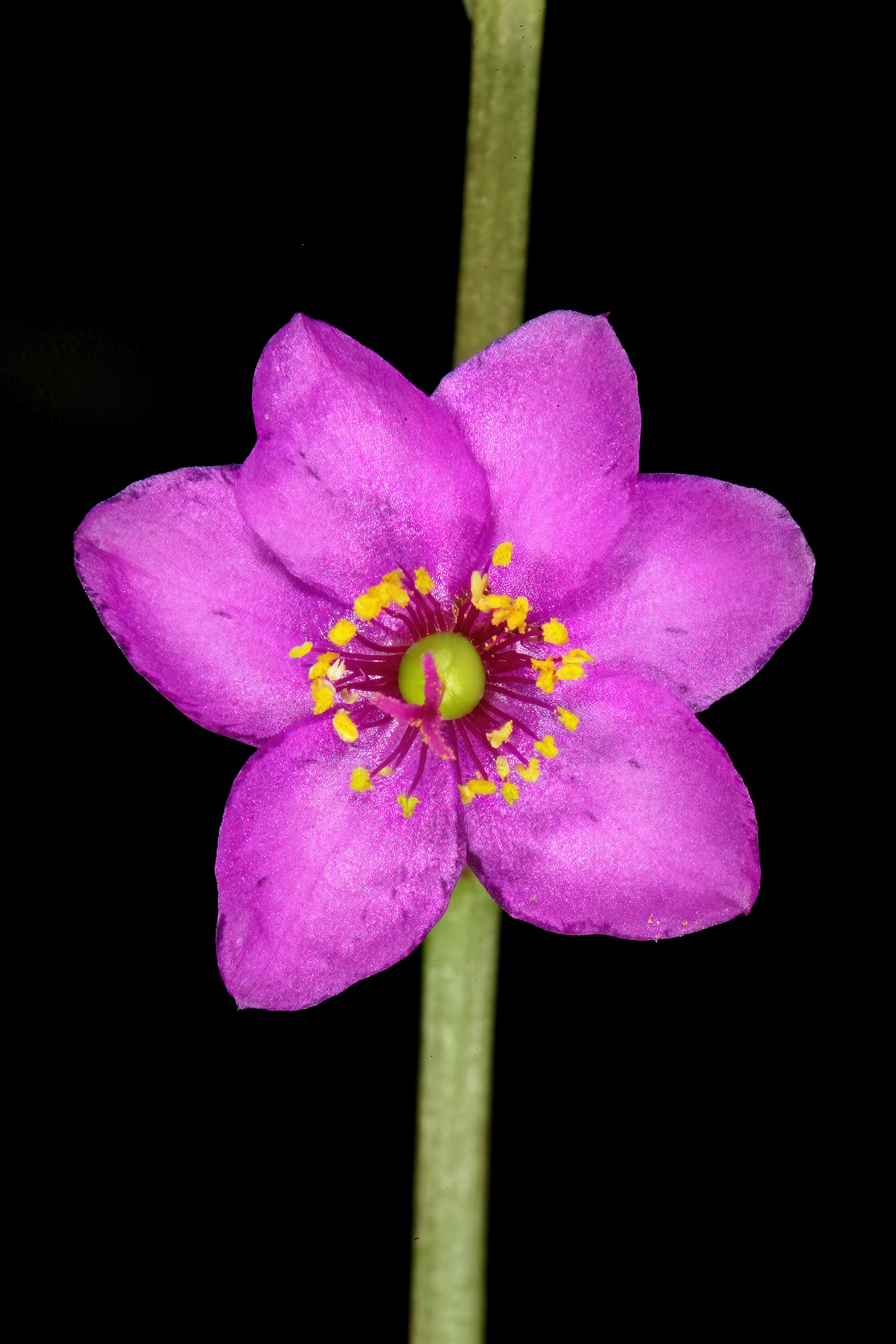
Talinum portulacifolium, fameflower

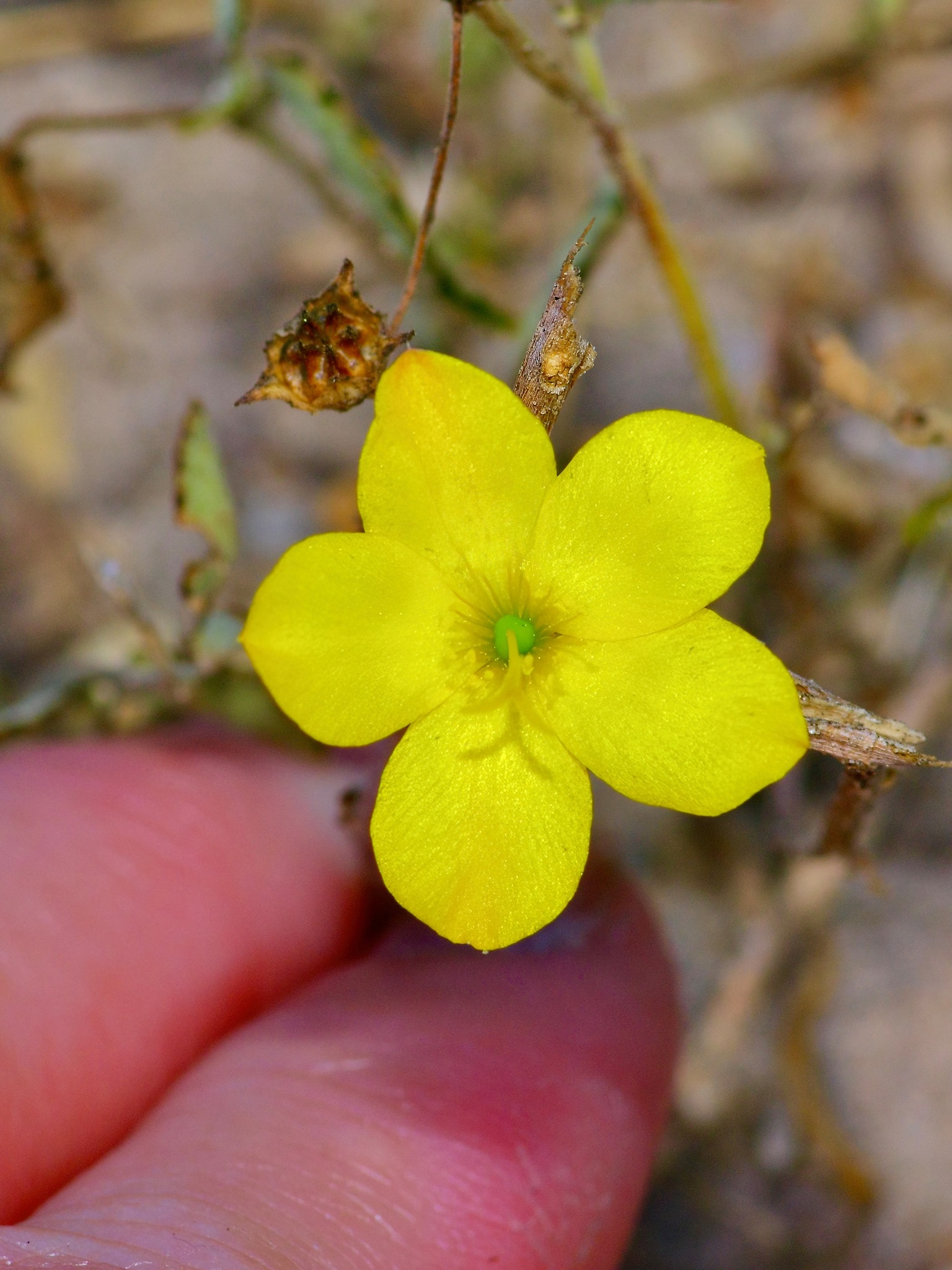
Talinum polygaloides, orange flameflower
