= Flameflower =

Flameflower, flame flower, or flame-flower is a common name that may refer to several flowering plants, including:

- Ipomopsis rubra, a species in the family Polemoniaceae native to the central and eastern United States
- Macranthera flammea, a species in the family Orobanchaceae native to the south-eastern United States
- Some species of Phemeranthus, a genus in the family Montiaceae, including:
  - Phemeranthus brevifolius, a species native to the southern United States
  - Phemeranthus humilis, a species native to the south-western United States
  - Phemeranthus longipes, a species native to the southern United States
  - Phemeranthus marginatus, a species endemic to Arizona, United States
  - Phemeranthus rhizomatus, a species endemic to New Mexico, United States
  - Phemeranthus spinescens, a species native to the north-western United States
  - Phemeranthus validulus, a species endemic to Arizona, United States
- Talinopsis frutescens, a species in the family Anacampserotaceae native to Mexico and the southern United States
- Tropaeolum speciosum, a species in the family Tropaeolaceae native to Chile

Some of these species are also known as "fameflower": the term "flameflower" appears to be an alteration.

Plants named Flameflower
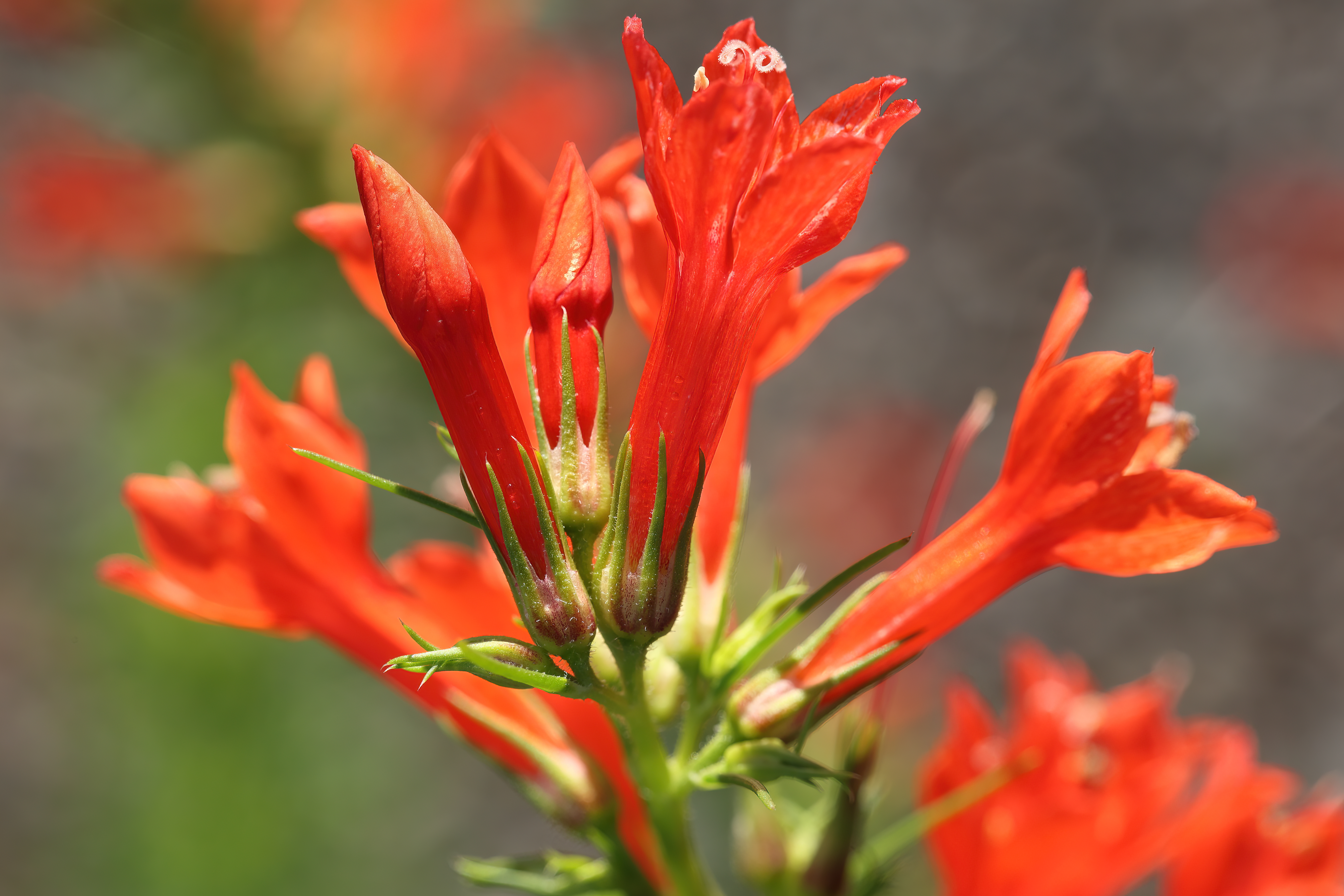
Ipomopsis rubra

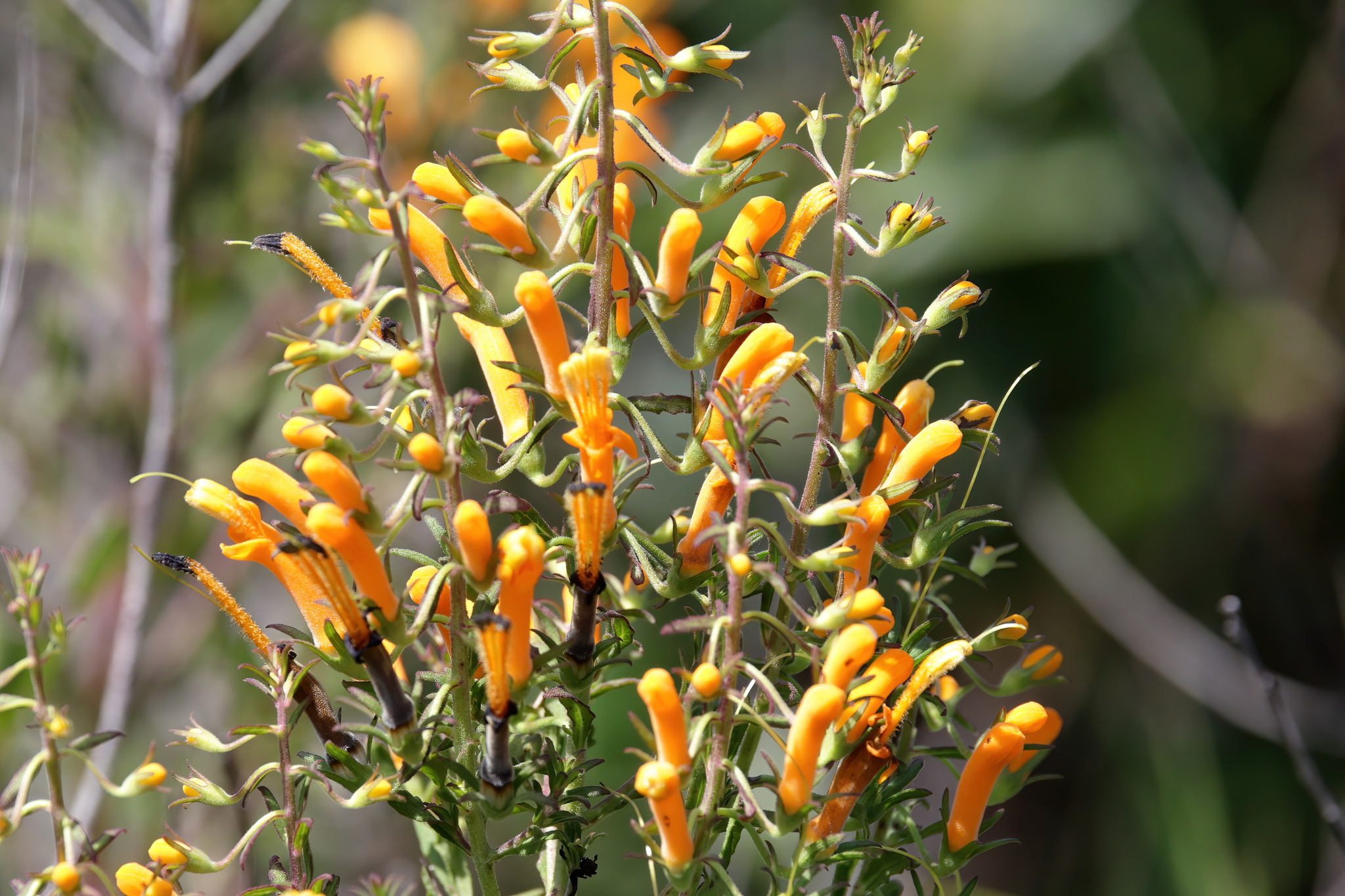
Macranthera flammea

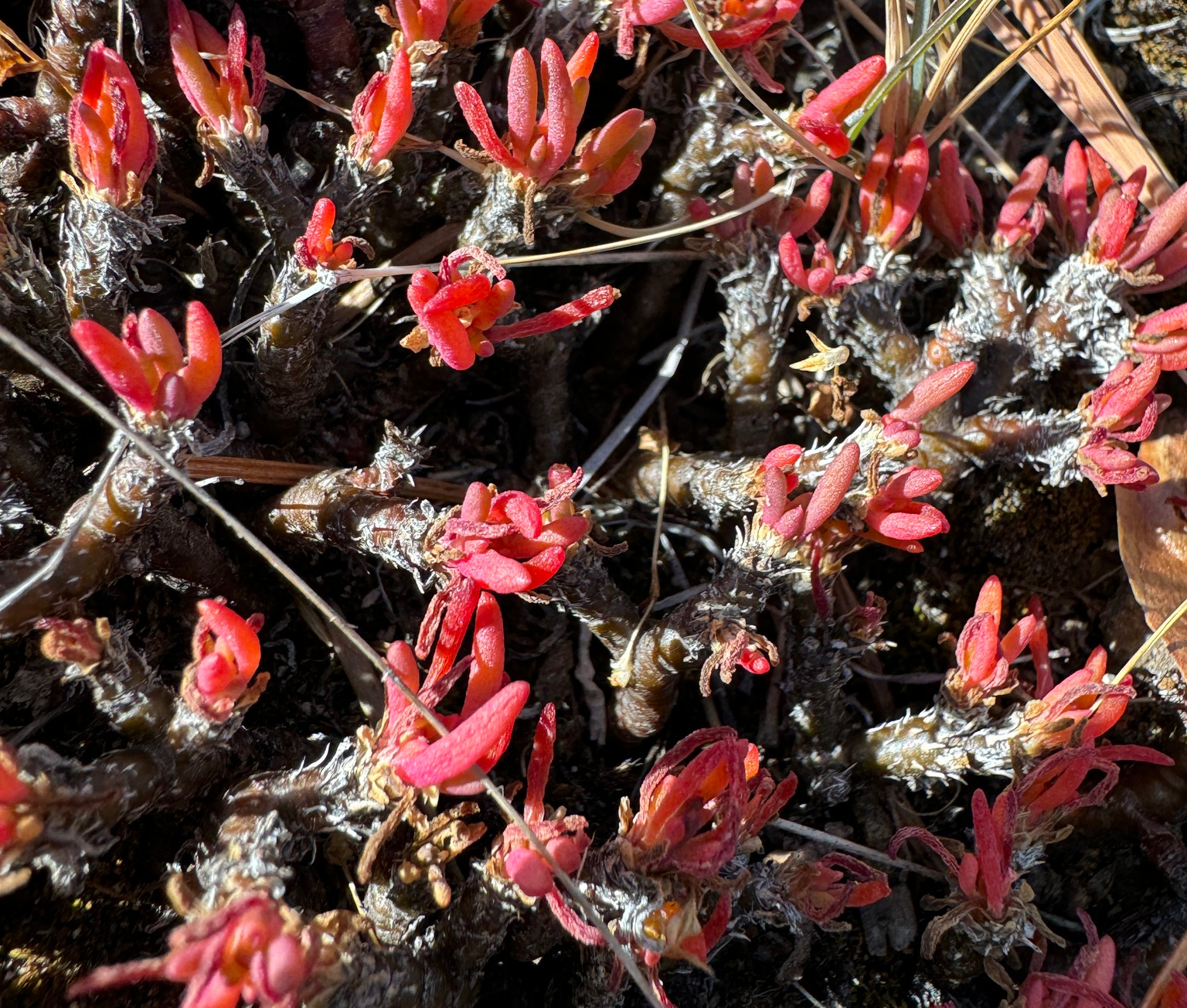
Phemeranthus spinescens

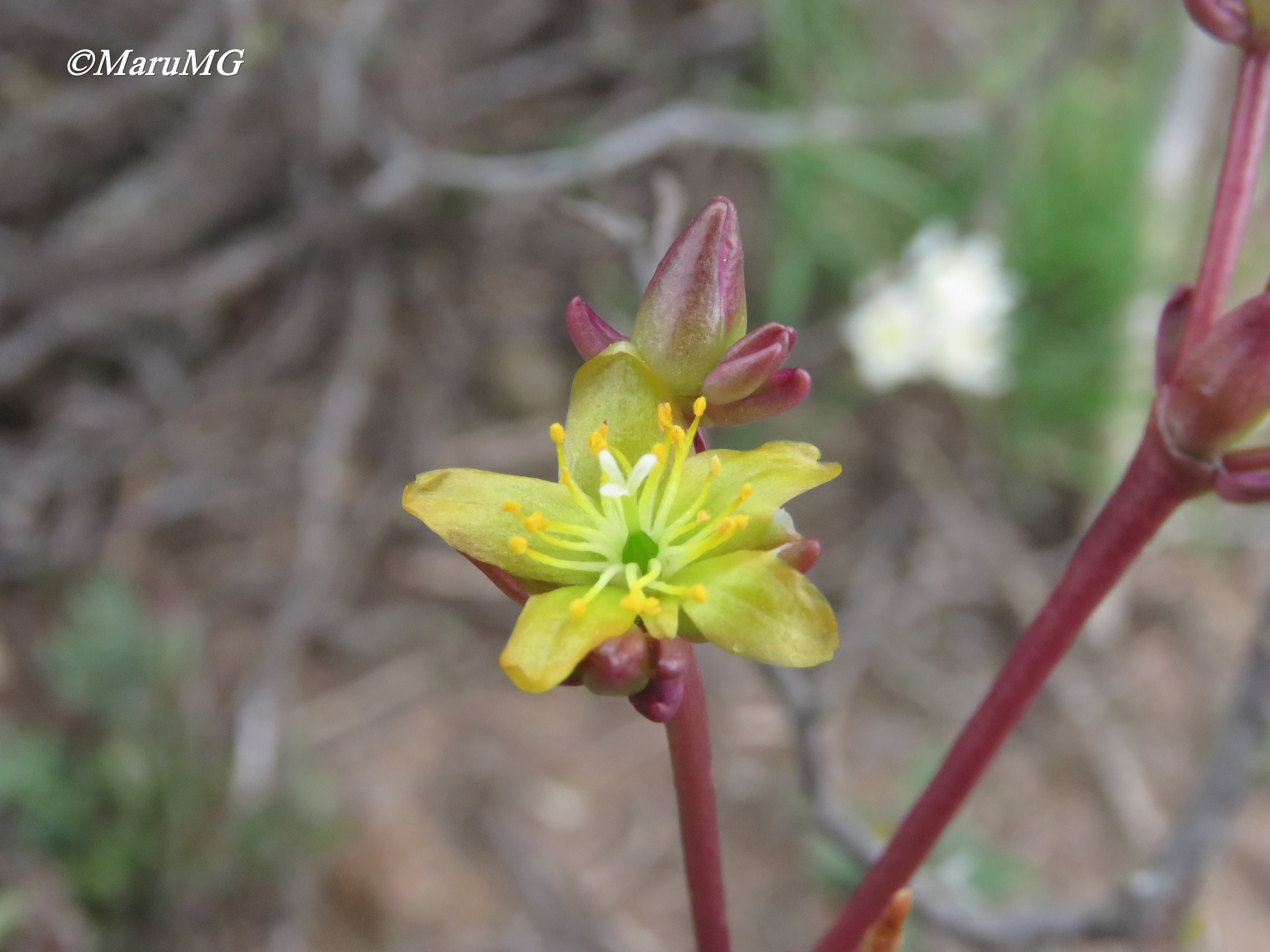
Talinopsis frutescens

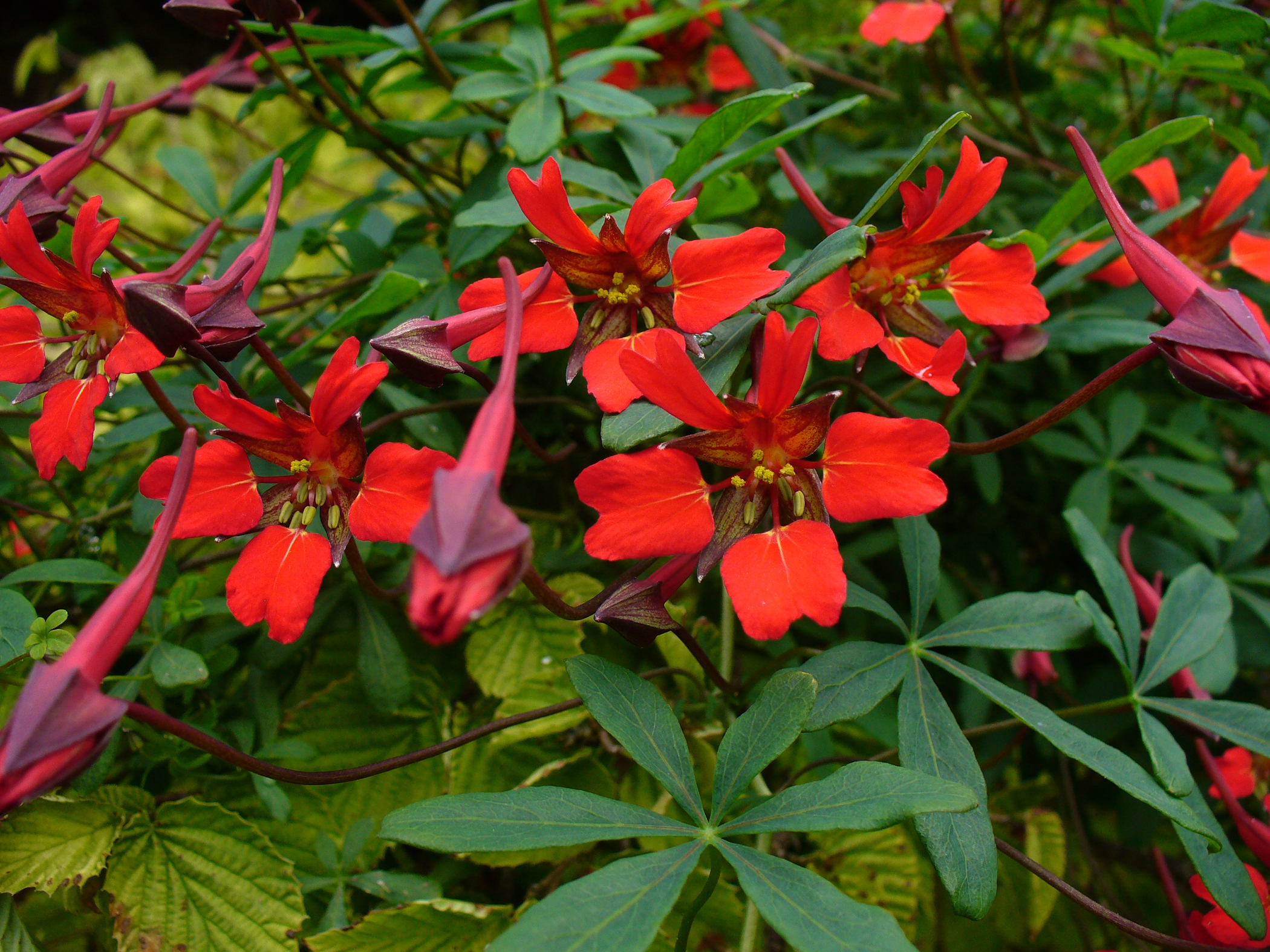
Tropaeolum speciosum
