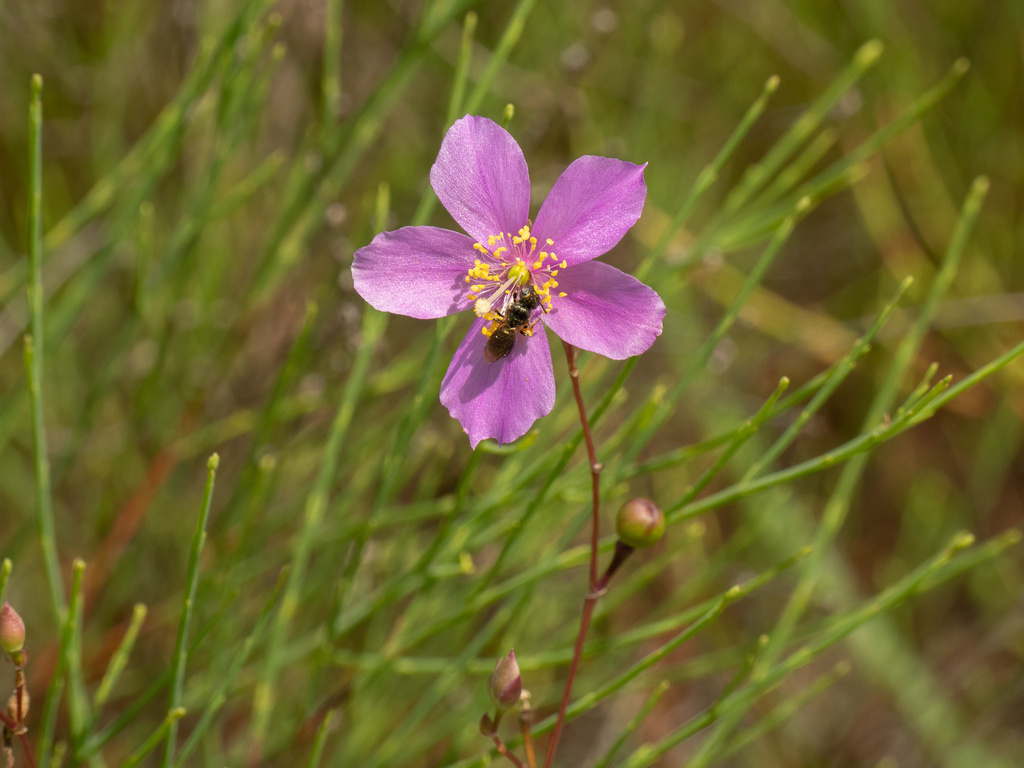
- Phemeranthus mengesii in bloom
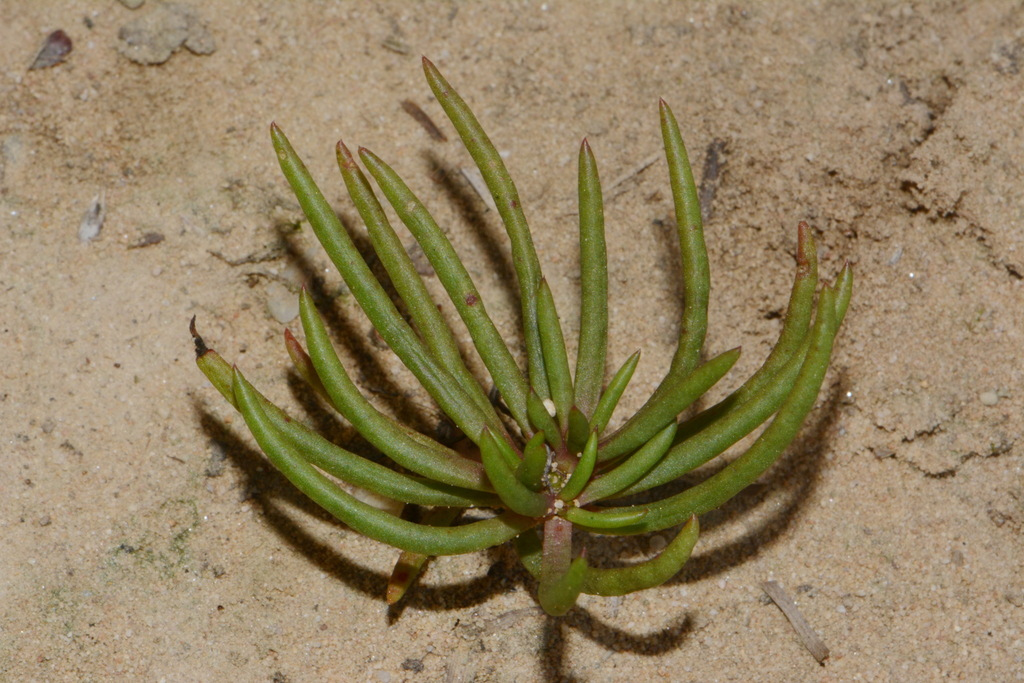
- Succulent foliage of Phemeranthus mengesii

Conservation status
- Vulnerable (NatureServe)

Scientific classification
- Kingdom: Plantae
- Clade: Tracheophytes
- Clade: Angiosperms
- Clade: Eudicots
- Order: Caryophyllales
- Family: Montiaceae
- Genus: Phemeranthus
- Species: P. mengesii

Binomial name
- Phemeranthus mengesii (W.Wolf) Kiger

Synonyms
- Talinum mengesii W.Wolf

= Phemeranthus mengesii =

Species of flowering plant

Phemeranthus mengesii, commonly known as the large-flowered rock-pink, is a species of flowering plant in the family Montiaceae. It is a perennial herb endemic to the southeastern United States, where it grows in shallow soils on exposed granite, sandstone, and Altamaha Grit outcrops, often in sites wetted by seepage.

Its range extends from western and central South Carolina through Georgia to northern Alabama and south-central Tennessee. Although rare across much of its range, it may be locally common at some Georgia rock outcrops.

NatureServe classifies Phemeranthus mengesii as G3, or vulnerable, globally. Threats include residential and commercial development, stone quarrying, recreational disturbance, off-highway vehicle use, camping, trash dumping, invasive plants, and forest succession.
