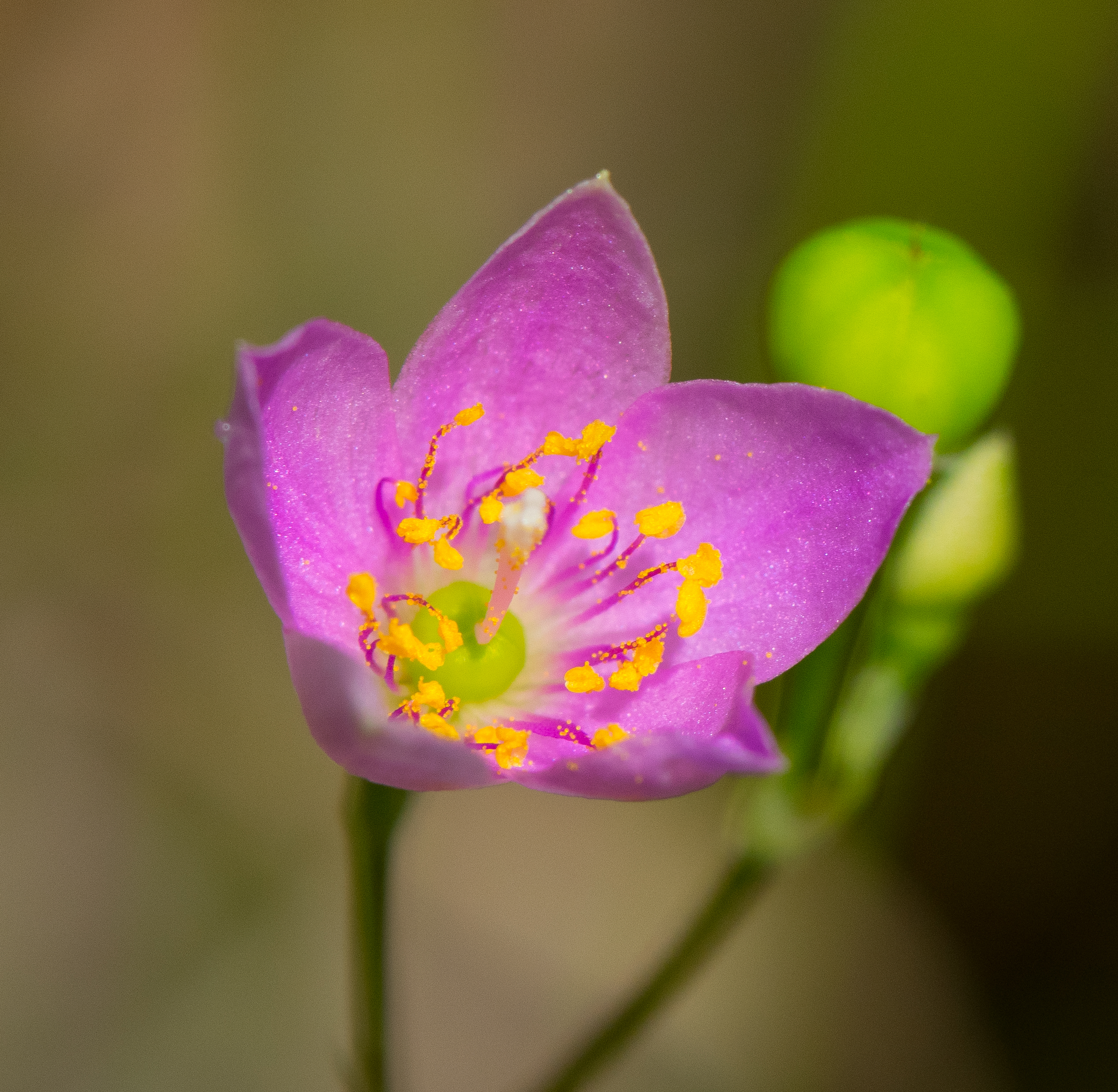

Conservation status
- Vulnerable (NatureServe)

Scientific classification
- Kingdom: Plantae
- Clade: Embryophytes
- Clade: Tracheophytes
- Clade: Spermatophytes
- Clade: Angiosperms
- Clade: Eudicots
- Order: Caryophyllales
- Family: Montiaceae
- Genus: Phemeranthus
- Species: P. rugospermus

Binomial name
- Phemeranthus rugospermus (Holz.) Kiger 2001

Synonyms
- Talinum rugospermum Holz. 1899

= Phemeranthus rugospermus =

Species of flowering plant

Phemeranthus rugospermus is a species of flowering plant in the miner's lettuce family, Montiaceae, known by the common names prairie fameflower, rough-seeded fameflower, sand fameflower, and flower-of-an-hour. It is native to the central United States from Texas and Louisiana north to Nebraska, Minnesota, and Wisconsin.

Phemeranthus rugospermus is a perennial herb growing up to 25 centimeters (10 inches) tall with an erect branching or unbranched stem. The cylindrical leaves are up to 6 centimeters (2.4 inches) long. The pink flowers arise on a tall stalk. The capsules contain wrinkly seeds. The flowers open for one day, and only in the afternoon.

Phemeranthus rugospermus grows in open habitat where there is little competition from other plants, such as rock outcrops, stretches of sand, or open woods. It can be found on dunes along the banks of the Mississippi River. It benefits from low levels of disturbance, such as fires. Human-caused forms of disturbance, such as off-road vehicle activity, can be beneficial at times. Other plants in the habitat may include Andropogon scoparius, Selaginella rupestris, Opuntia compressa, Panicum virgatum, Allium stellatum, Isanthus brachiatus, Houstonia longifolia, and Ambrosia artemisiifolia.
