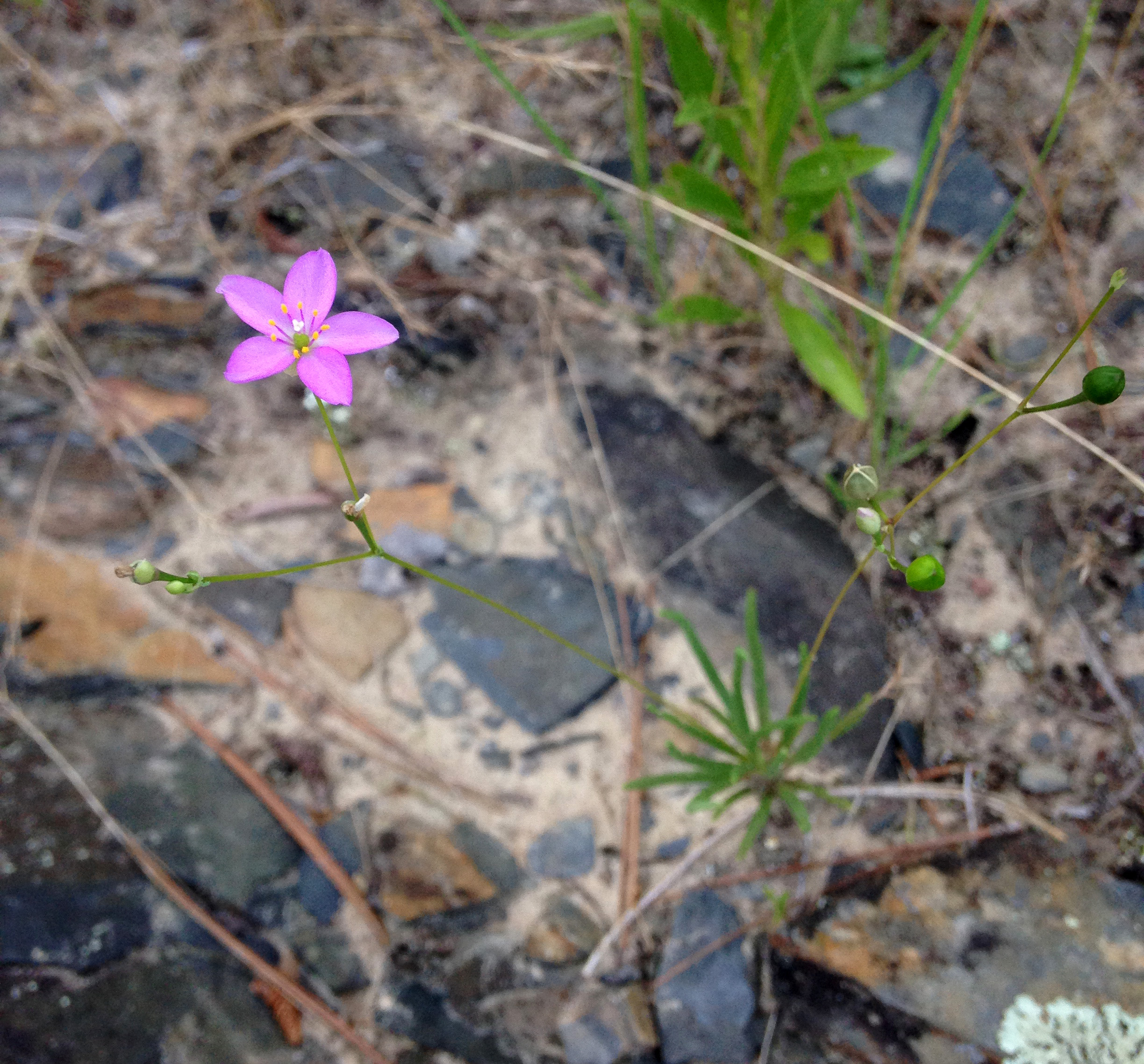

Conservation status
- Secure (NatureServe)

Scientific classification
- Kingdom: Plantae
- Clade: Embryophytes
- Clade: Tracheophytes
- Clade: Spermatophytes
- Clade: Angiosperms
- Clade: Eudicots
- Order: Caryophyllales
- Family: Montiaceae
- Genus: Phemeranthus
- Species: P. parviflorus

Binomial name
- Phemeranthus parviflorus (Nutt.) Kiger

Synonyms
- List: Claytonia nuttaliana Kuntze; Litanum parviflorum (Nutt.) Nieuwl.; Phemeranthus confertiflorus (Greene) Hershk.; Talinum appalachianum W.Wolf; Talinum confertiflorum Greene; Talinum fallax Poelln.; Talinum gooddingii P.Wilson; Talinum gracile Rose & Standl.; Talinum parviflorum Nutt.; Talinum rosei P.Wilson

= Phemeranthus parviflorus =

Plant species in the springbeauty family

Phemeranthus parviflorus, commonly called sunbright or prairie fame flower, is a species of flowering plant in the montia family (Montiaceae). It is native to North America, where it is found in the central and eastern United States and northern Mexico. Its natural habitat is in dry, sandy or rocky areas, typically on acidic substrates. Over its extensive range, it is found various communities such as grasslands, open woodlands, glades, mountain slopes, and bluffs.

Phemeranthus parviflorus is an herbaceous perennial. Its leaves are linear and succulent. It produces reddish-pink to reddish-purple flowers from May to September.
