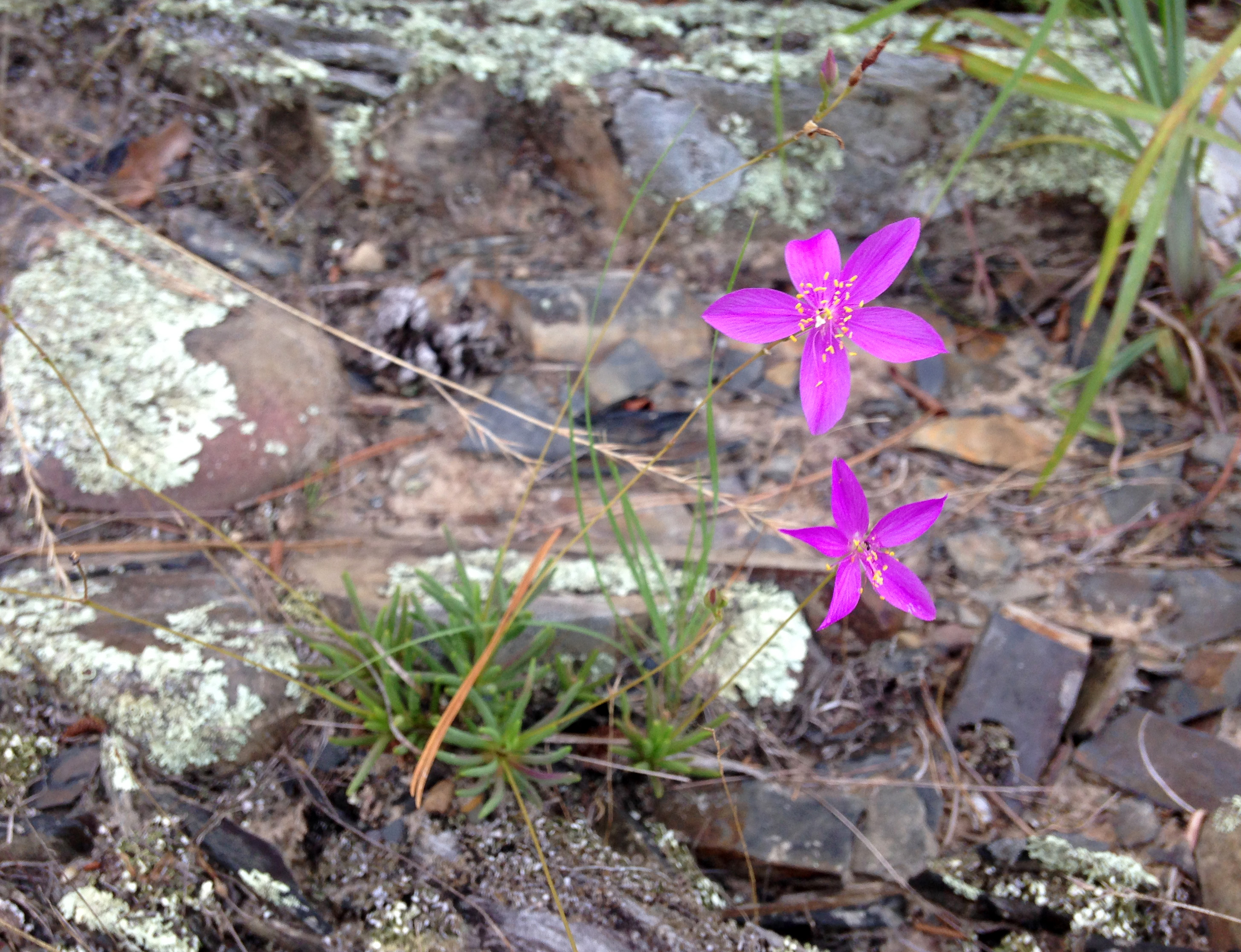

Scientific classification
- Kingdom: Plantae
- Clade: Embryophytes
- Clade: Tracheophytes
- Clade: Spermatophytes
- Clade: Angiosperms
- Clade: Eudicots
- Order: Caryophyllales
- Family: Montiaceae
- Genus: Phemeranthus
- Species: P. calycinus

Binomial name
- Phemeranthus calycinus (Engelm.) Kiger

Synonyms
- Claytonia calycina (Engelm.) Kuntze; Talinum calycinum Engelm.

= Phemeranthus calycinus =

Plant species in the family

Phemeranthus calycinus, commonly called largeflower fameflower, rock pink, or fame flower is a species of flowering plant in the montia family (Montiaceae). It is native to the central United States, and its natural habitat is on glades, sandy areas, or bluffs with rock outcrops.

== Description ==
Phemeranthus calycinus is an herbaceous perennial, typically growing in large colonies. Its leaves are up to 5 centimetres (2 in) long, linear, very narrow, succulent, and found at the base of the plant. A leafless flower stalk rises from the basal leaves to a height of about 30 centimetres (12 in). Pink-red to red-purple flowers are arranged in open groups at the end of the flower stalks. The flowers, which only open for a couple of hours in the early afternoon, have 5 to 8 rounded petals, 2 sepals, 30 to 45 stamens, and a pistil with a thin style. Flowers bloom off and on for 1 to 3 months in the summer and are about 3 centimetres (1 in) across.

== Taxonomy ==
A synonymous name for Phemeranthus calycinus is Talinum calycinum.

== Etymology ==
The Latin specific epithet calycinus means calyx-like.

== Distribution and habitat ==
It is native to New Mexico, Colorado, Texas, Oklahoma, Kansas, Nebraska, Louisiana, Arkansas, Missouri, and Illinois. It is listed as endangered in Illinois and critically imperiled/imperiled in Nebraska. It is found primarily in the areas of the Great Plains and Ozark and Ouachita Mountains in the United States. Its natural habitat is on glades, sandy areas, or bluffs with rock outcrops, typically on acidic substrates (although rare populations on calcareous substrates are known).
