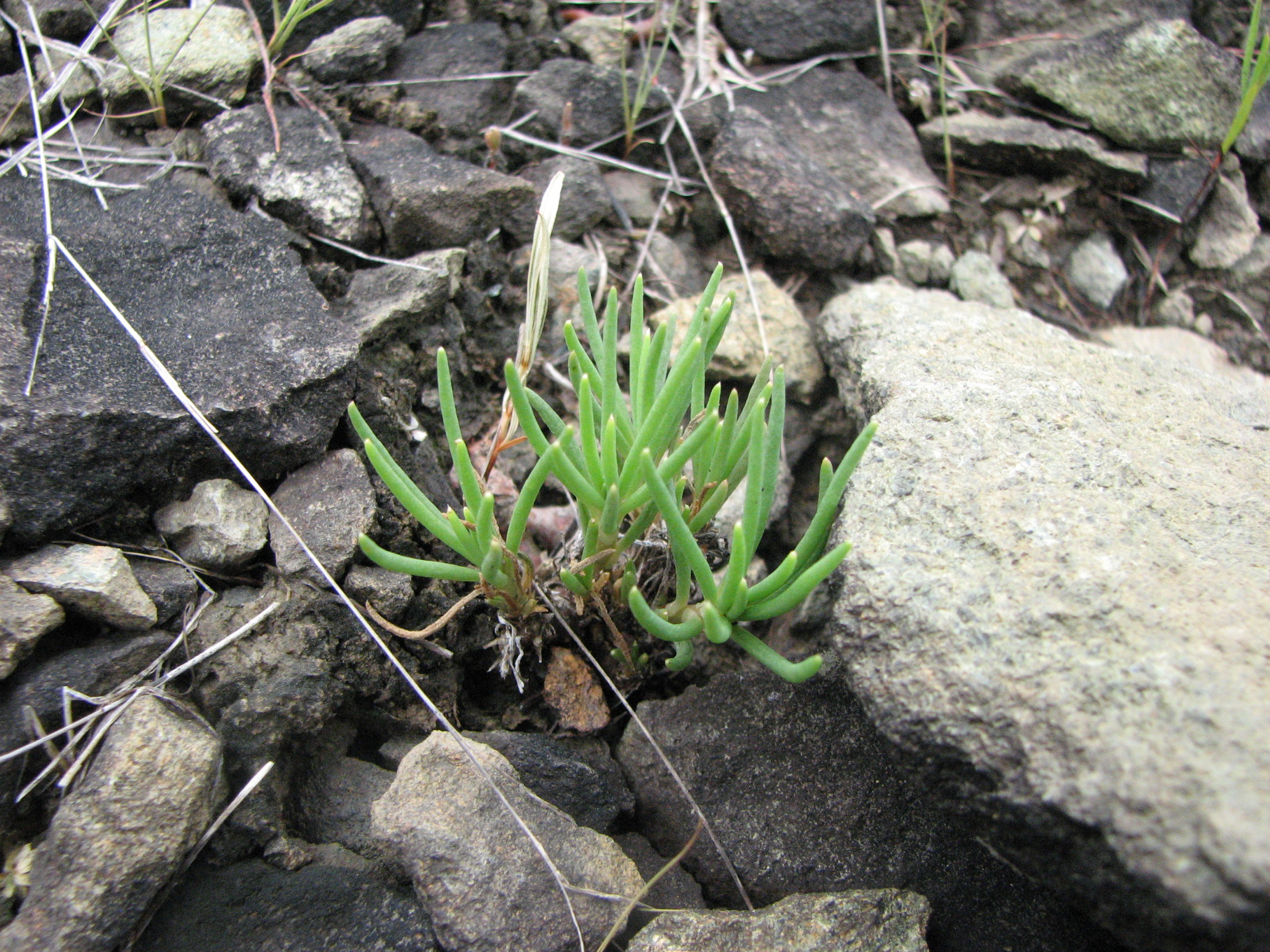
- Phemeranthus teretifolius

Scientific classification
- Kingdom: Plantae
- Clade: Embryophytes
- Clade: Tracheophytes
- Clade: Spermatophytes
- Clade: Angiosperms
- Clade: Eudicots
- Order: Caryophyllales
- Family: Montiaceae
- Genus: Phemeranthus; Raf.

Species
- See text

= Phemeranthus =

Genus of flowering plants

Phemeranthus (fameflower) is a genus of flowering plants in the miner's lettuce family, Montiaceae, native to the Americas. It was formerly placed in Portulacaceae. The name is derived from the Greek words εφήμερος (ephemeros), meaning "living for one day," and ἄνθος (anthos), meaning "flower." Common names for the various species are often fame flower, rock rose, rock pink, and sand pink.

== Selected species ==
- Phemeranthus brevicaulis (S.Watson) Kiger – Dwarf fameflower
- Phemeranthus brevifolius (Torr.) Hershk. – Pygmy fameflower
- Phemeranthus calcaricus (Ware) Kiger – Limestone fameflower
- Phemeranthus calycinus (Engelm.) Kiger – Largeflower fameflower
- Phemeranthus confertiflorus (Greene) Hershk. – New Mexico fameflower
- Phemeranthus humilis (Greene) Kiger – Pinos Altos fameflower
- Phemeranthus longipes (Woot. & Standl.) Kiger – Pink fameflower
- Phemeranthus marginatus (Greene) Kiger – Tepic fameflower
- Phemeranthus mengesii (W.Wolf) Kiger – Menges' fameflower
- Phemeranthus parviflorus (Nutt.) Kiger – Sunbright
- Phemeranthus piedmontanus Ware – Piedmont fameflower
- Phemeranthus rhizomatus D.J.Ferguson – Gila fameflower
- Phemeranthus rugospermus (Holz.) Kiger – Prairie fameflower
- Phemeranthus sediformis (Poelln.) Kiger – Okanogan fameflower
- Phemeranthus spinescens (Torr.) Hershk. – Spiny fameflower
- Phemeranthus teretifolius (Pursh) Raf. – Quill fameflower
- Phemeranthus thompsonii (N.D.Atwood & S.L.Welsh) Kiger – Cedar Mountain fameflower [synonym of P. valudulus]
- Phemeranthus validulus (Greene) Kiger – Tusayan fameflower
