= John M. Holzinger =

American bryologist

John Michael Holzinger
- John M. Holzinger, c. 1880s
- Born: May 14, 1853; Hachtel, Germany
- Died: May 31, 1929 (aged 76)
- Education: Olivet College; Yale Seminary
- Children: 2
- Scientific career
- Fields: Bryology
- Workplaces: Winona State Normal School
- Author abbrev. (botany): Holz.

John Michael Holzinger (May 14, 1853 – May 31, 1929) was a German-born American bryologist, expert on the bryoflora of Colorado, and third president of the Sullivant Moss Society.

== Biography ==
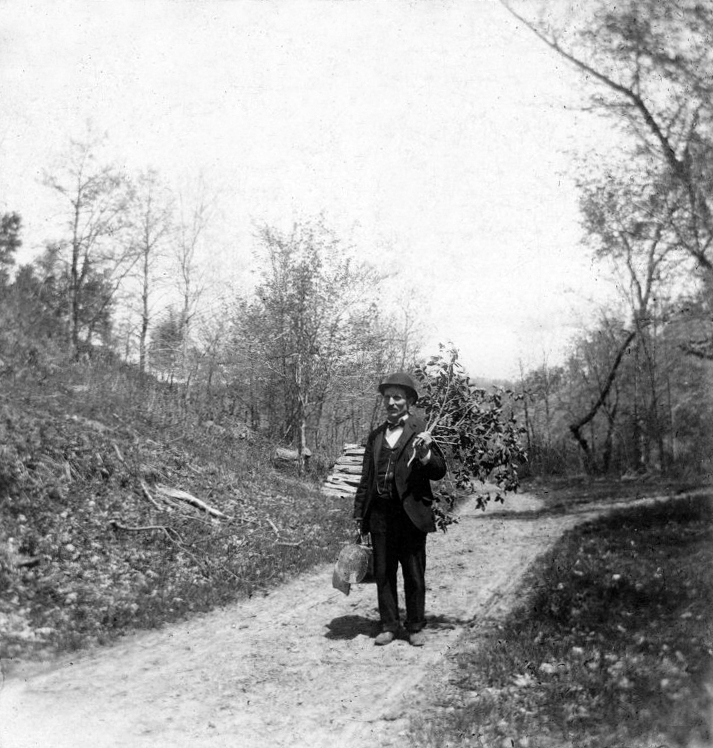
John M. Holzinger collecting ca. 1910

Holzinger was born on May 14, 1853, in Hachtel, Germany. In 1868, he emigrated to the United States with his parents, settling in Charles City, Iowa, where he attended high school. The principal of the school, Irwin Shepard, convinced him to attend Olivet College. In 1874, he graduated from Olivet. He then attended Yale Seminary from 1879 to 1882.

In 1882, Holzinger was invited by Shepard on to teach science and botany at Winona State Normal School. Holzinger accepted, and taught there from 1882 to 1890. During this time he also became the curator for the museum located in Old Main. In 1890, he left to join the United States Department of Agriculture division of botany. In 1894, he returned to teaching at Winona, until his retirement for health reasons in 1922. The museum in Old Main was destroyed in a fire on December 3rd of that year, destroying his collection. He would begin slowly rebuilding his collection for the remainder of his life.

He died on May 31, 1929, after suffering a paralytic stroke followed by heart failure. His health had been slowly declining for the previous three years.

=== Scientific contributions ===
Holzinger made several noteworthy collections of bryophytes and exsiccata series from North America. His exsiccata Musci Acrocarpi Boreali-Americani was a valuable asset to 20th century bryology. The series Mosses of Colorado. Distributed by J. M. Holzinger: collected by Carl F. Baker 1896 distributed specimens collected by Charles Fuller Baker.

== Legacy ==
The flower Triodanis holzingeri was named in Holzinger's honor by Rogers McVaugh.

== Selected publications ==
- (1892) List of plants collected by C.S. Sheldon and M.A. Carleton in Indian Territory in 1891. U.S. Dept. of Agriculture. Division of Botany. Contributions from the U.S. National Herbarium
- (1893) List of plants new to Florida. Washington: Govt. Print. Office
- (1893) Descriptions of four new plants from Texas and Colorado. Washington: Govt. Print. Office
- (1895) Report on a collection of plants made by J.H. Sandberg and assistants in northern Idaho in the year 1892. Washington: Gov't Print. Office
- (1898) On some Mosses at High Altitudes
- (1923) The genus Crossidium in North America

The standard author abbreviation Holz. is used to indicate this person as the author when citing a botanical name.
