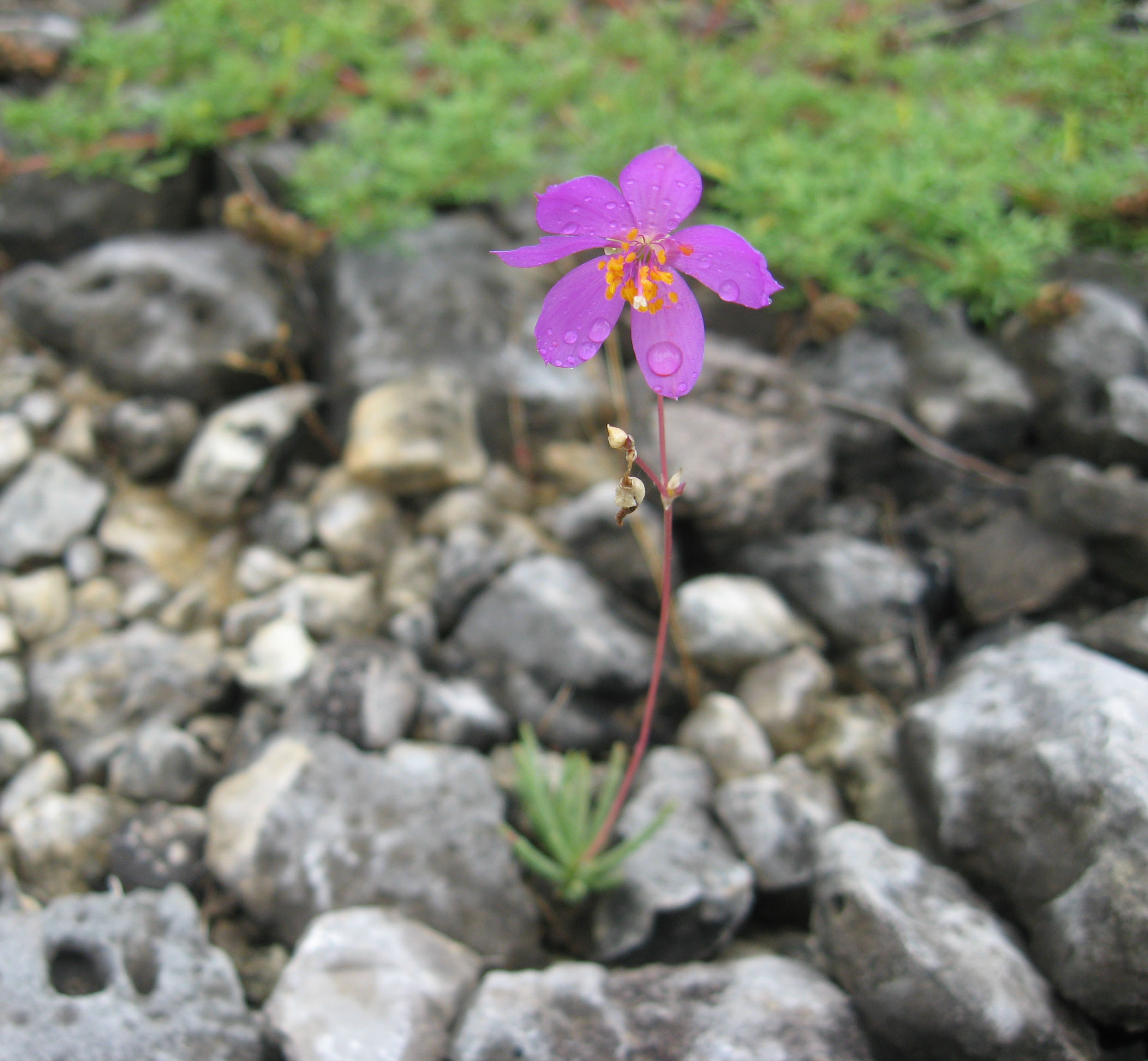

Conservation status
- Vulnerable (NatureServe)

Scientific classification
- Kingdom: Plantae
- Clade: Embryophytes
- Clade: Tracheophytes
- Clade: Spermatophytes
- Clade: Angiosperms
- Clade: Eudicots
- Order: Caryophyllales
- Family: Montiaceae
- Genus: Phemeranthus
- Species: P. calcaricus

Binomial name
- Phemeranthus calcaricus (S.Ware) Kiger

Synonyms
- Talinum calcaricum S.Ware

= Phemeranthus calcaricus =

Plant species in the springbeauty family

Phemeranthus calcaricus, the limestone fameflower, is a species of flowering plant in the family Montiaceae. It is native to limestone glades of the Interior Low Plateaus of Tennessee, Kentucky, and Alabama, and in the Ozark Mountains of Arkansas. The majority populations are found in the Nashville Basin of Tennessee, where it can be locally abundant on exposed limestone in high quality glades.

Phemeranthus calcaricus is a small, succulent perennial that is uncommon throughout its range.
