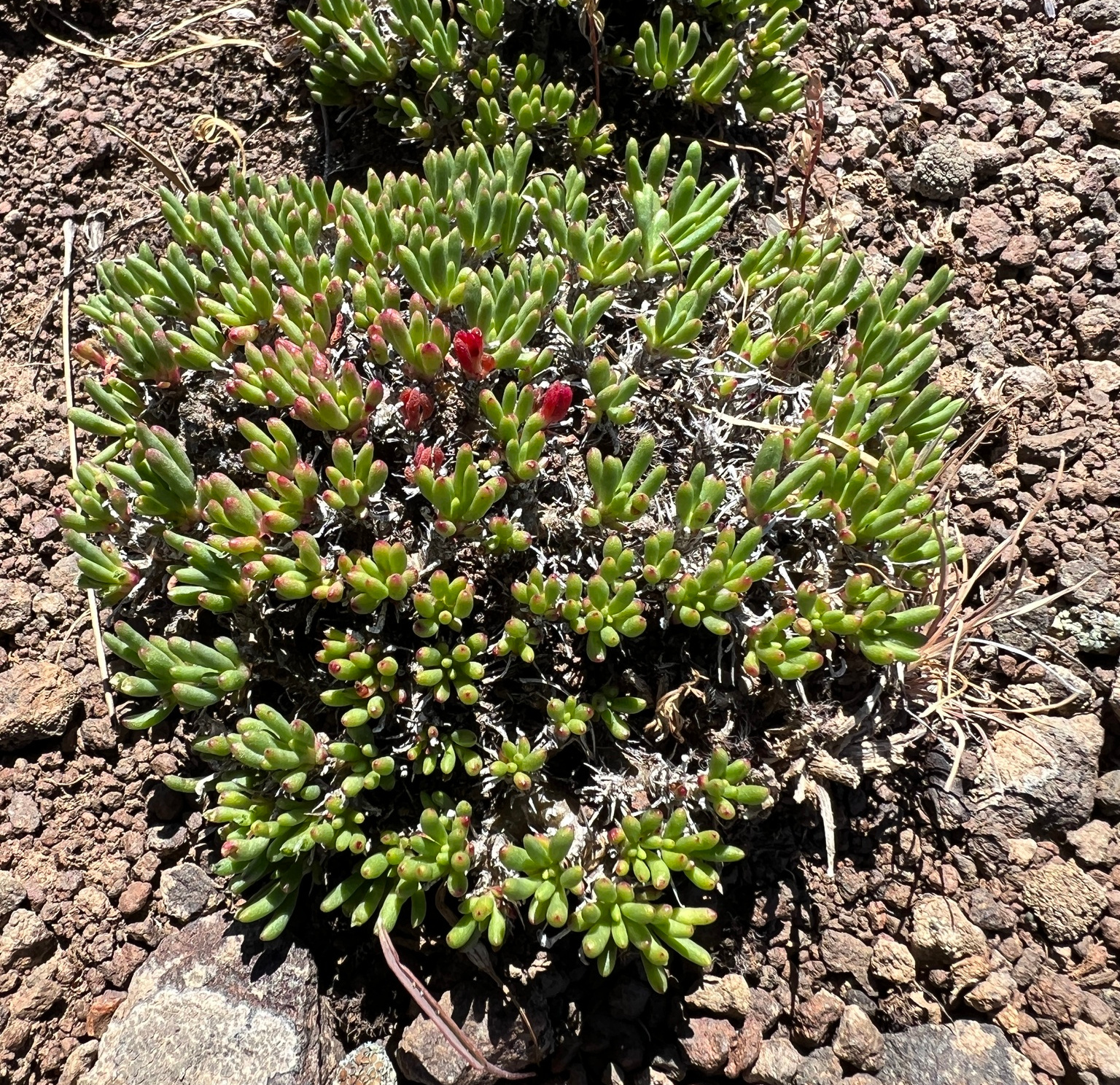

Conservation status
- Apparently Secure (NatureServe)

Scientific classification
- Kingdom: Plantae
- Clade: Embryophytes
- Clade: Tracheophytes
- Clade: Spermatophytes
- Clade: Angiosperms
- Clade: Eudicots
- Order: Caryophyllales
- Family: Montiaceae
- Genus: Phemeranthus
- Species: P. spinescens

Binomial name
- Phemeranthus spinescens (Torr.) Hershkovitz

= Phemeranthus spinescens =

Species of plant

Phemeranthus spinescens is a North American perennial plant in the Montiaceae family, with the common name spiny fameflower.

== Description ==
Phemeranthus spinescens is a small ground-hugging plant with succulent sausage-shaped leaves up to 2.5 cm long, growing in tight clusters at the ends of multiple crown branches. The leaves are green and usually shiny, sometimes tinged with red, and often turn bright red in late summer or autumn. When the leaves wither the central leaf mid-rib often remains to form a short spine, from which the species name spinescens.

The magenta flowers with yellow anthers are 2 to 3 cm in width and form on a branched raceme. Each flower opens only briefly but multiple buds on a raceme may open over a period several days.

== Range and habitat ==
Phemeranthus spinescens occurs on the Columbia Plateau of central Washington and central and eastern Oregon. It is typically found in dry very rocky soil with sparse vegetation.

== Gallery ==
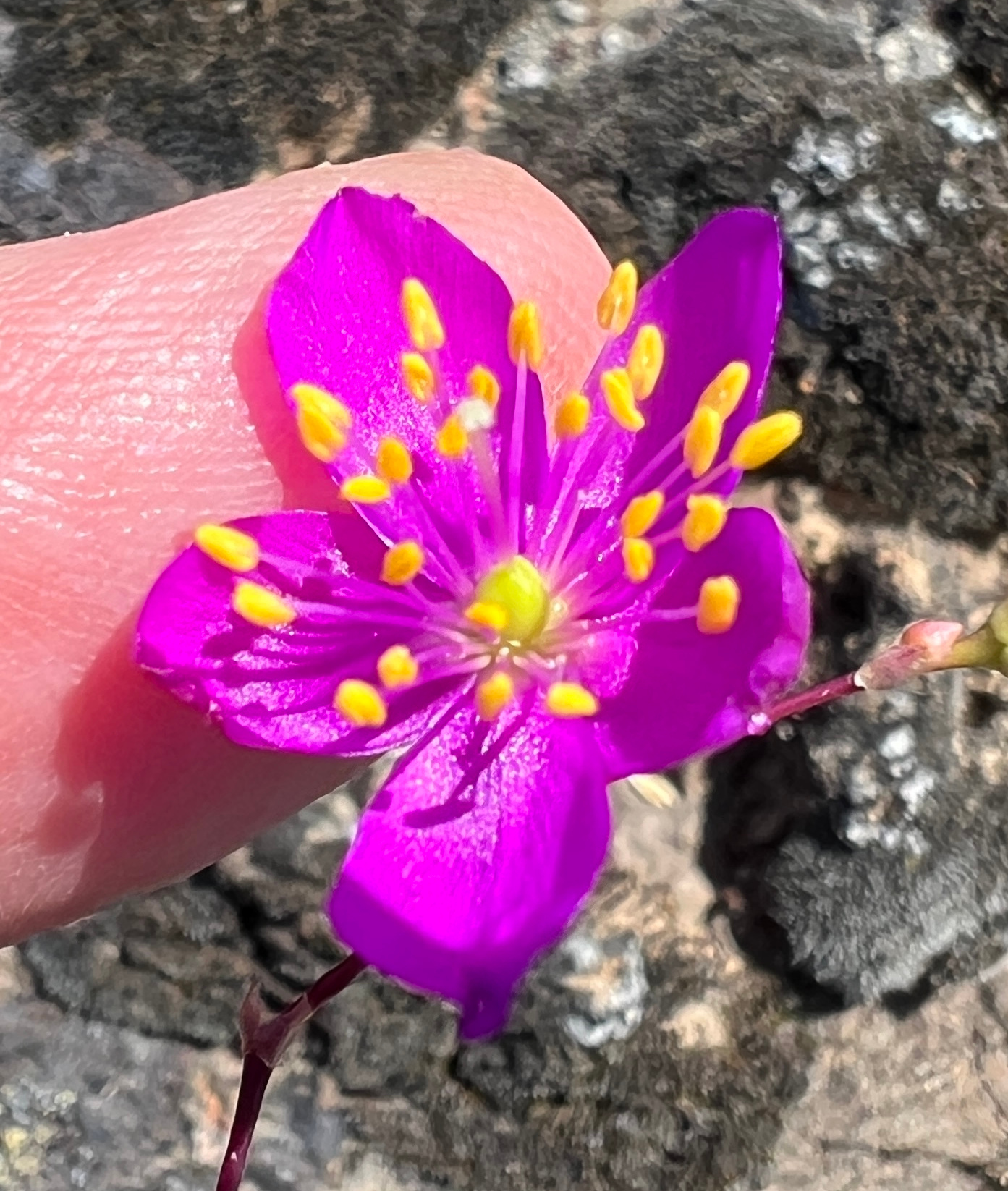
Flower

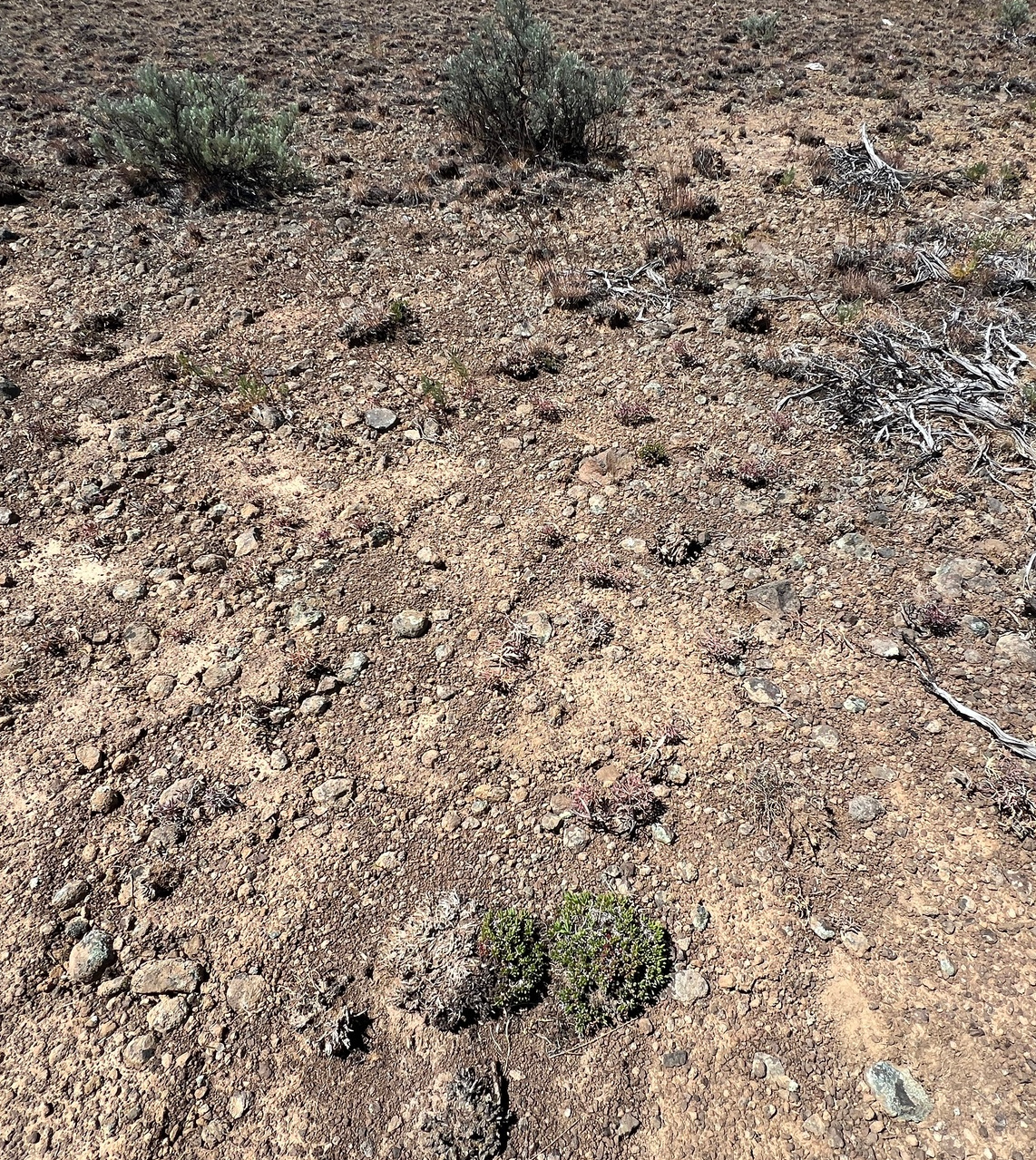
Habitat

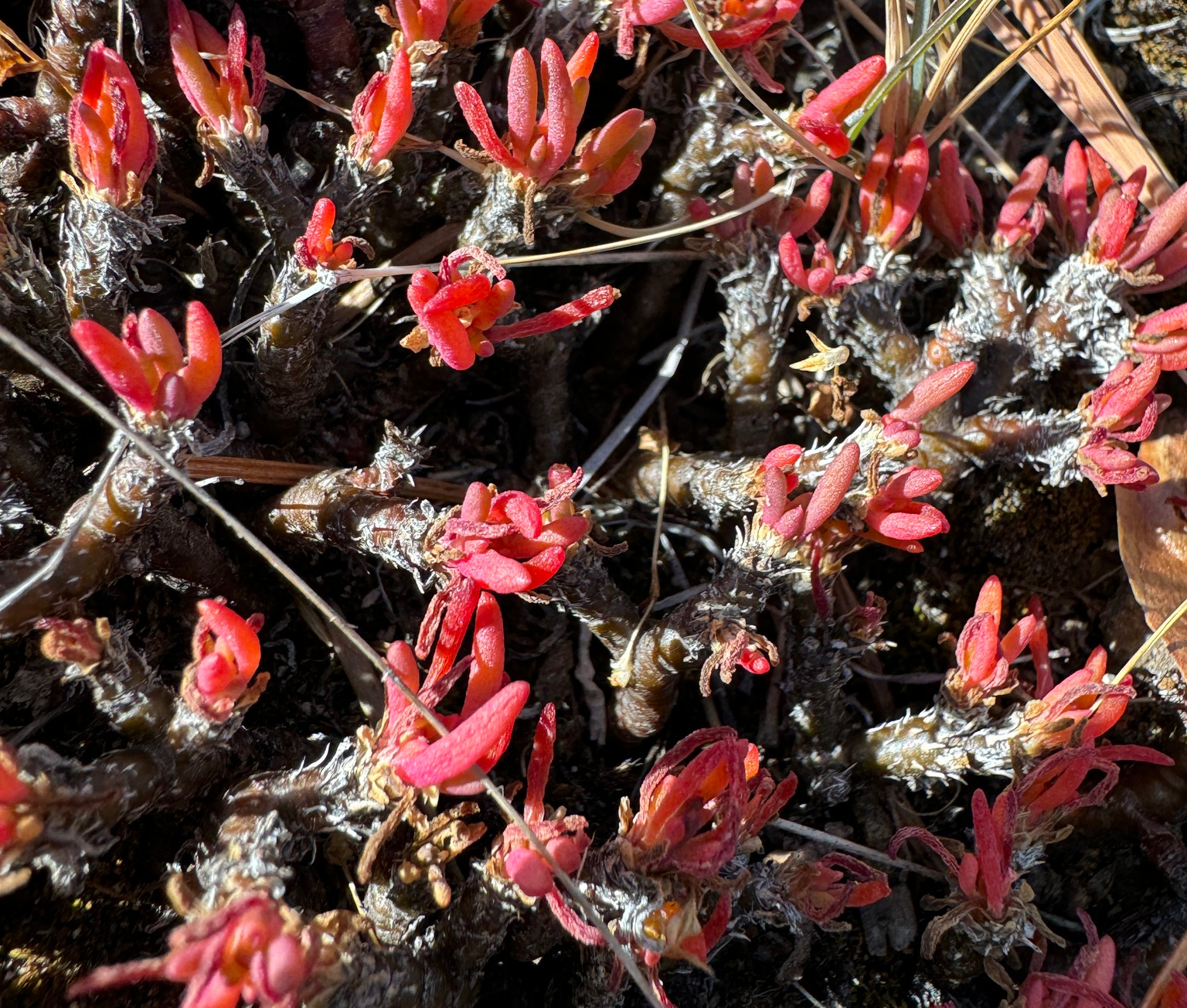
Spines and red leaves
