= Gibraltar Mountain (Washington) =

Peak in the Kettle River Range, Washington

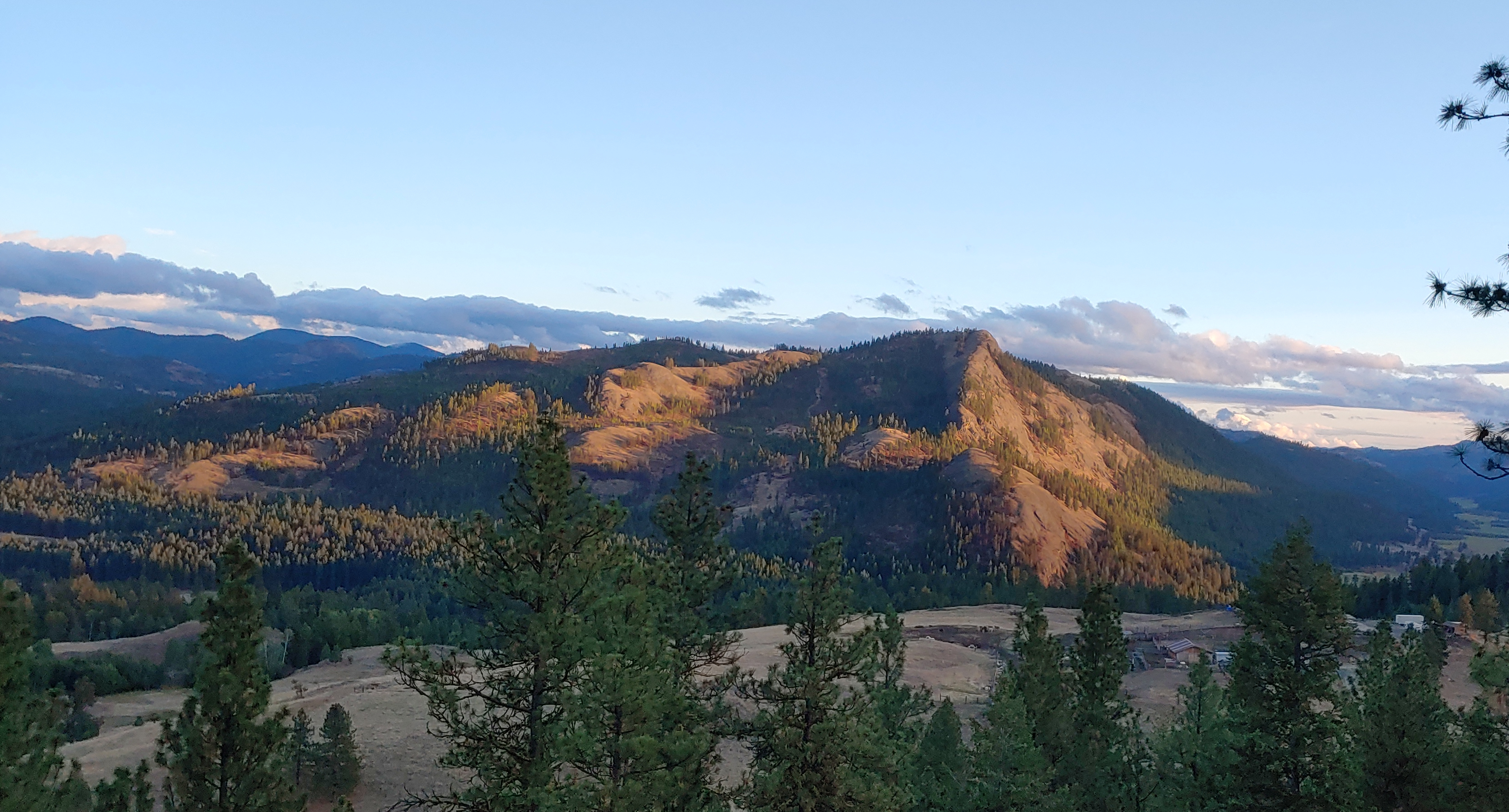
- Viewed from the north, September 2021

Highest point
- Elevation: 3,784 ft (1,153 m); Lidar
- Prominence: 169 ft (52 m)
- Listing: Mountains of Washington
- Coordinates: 48°38′4″N 118°42′30″W

Geography
- Location within Washington (state)
- Location: Ferry County, Washington, US
- Parent range: Kettle River Range
- Topo map: USGS Republic

Gibraltar Mountain, elevation 3,784 ft (1,153 m), is a peak in the Monashee Mountains, located 1.5 mi (2.4 km) southeast of Republic, Washington, United States. The name was originally spelled with an "e" as Gibralter Mountain, but current sources use an "a" instead. The main geologic mass of the mountain is composed of Sanpoil Volcanics igneous rock, while topographically, it is defined by several faults, an ancient river system, and the Cordilleran ice sheet. A diverse group of plants is found across the mountain slopes, including trees, shrubs, herbs and parasitic. Wildfires are a threat to the mountain with areas being high risk due to wildland–urban interface and proximity to Republic. Human use has included scouting and trail building.

== Location ==
Gibraltar Mountain is located 1.5 mi (2.4 km) southeast of Republic in northwest central Ferry County, Washington. It is part of the western edge of the Kettle River Range, a subrange of the Monashee Mountains. The eastern side of Gibraltar is bordered by the O'Brian Creek Valley drainage which cuts a course on the eastern flank. The northern and western sides are bounded by the Sanpoil River Valley. The southern areas transition into a south trending ridge and highlands leading to Camel Back and Quartz Mountains. The western face of the mountain is noted by H. Bancroft (1914) to be precipitous, and the mountain as a whole was considered by Umpleby (1910) to be one of the principal topographic features of the Republic Mining District.

== Spelling and etymology ==
Early references to the mountain, such as Umpleby (1910) used the spelling Gibralter with an "e". In contrast, the 1914 Republic District report and 1917 entry in Harry Landes A geographic dictionary of Washington had Gibraltar using an "a", which eventually became the prevailing spelling used on official maps and in news reports. To add to the confusion, Muessig used both spellings in his work on the Republic Quadrangle, using the "e" spelling twice in prose, while using the "a" spelling once, and also on the accompanying quadrangle map itself. The name origin is obscure, with the name recorded in the Colville National Forests unpublished History of Colville National Forest as Gibralter under the names list for regional locations "named after topographic and physical features".

== Geology ==
Based on geologic mapping, the bulk of Gibraltar is formed from Sanpoil Volcanics, with some very isolated glacial deposits on the lowest slope areas. The Sanpoil Volcanics are composed of a multitude of thin andesite and basalt bands which were erupted during the early Eocene. The mountain is on the eastern side of a downfaulted half graben formed by expansion of the greater regional continental crust. The andesite flows were initially thought to be younger than the overlying Klondike Mountain Formation's Tom Thumb Tuff, but better mapping showed the volcanics to be older. The Sanpoil syncline, formed by the downfaulting and which initially created the Sanpoil valley, is present along the north and western base of Gibraltar. A younger unnamed fault is exposed on the body of Gibraltar and also to the north in the Pine Grove area. A second large fault to the southeast of the mountain base is only identifiable from aerial views, where lines of trees delimit the surface exposure. The western face is composed of pyroxene latites, a type of andesite, exposed for an estimated 1,300 ft (400 m) to 2,000 ft (610 m).

== Topography ==
Gibraltar Mountain has a total elevation of 3,784 ft (1,153 m), arising from the Sanpoil Valley floor, which averages 2,300 ft (700 m) and overlooks Republic to the northwest which is a generalized elevation of 2,500 ft (760 m). While the gross topography of the mountain and region is unchanged from the Eocene, the aspects seen in the present were notably sculpted during the Wisconsin glaciation. The broad valley floor of the Sanpoil was suggested by Umpleby to have been modified by a predecessor to the Kettle River, which initially flowed south through the Curlew and Sanpoil Valleys. This flow either preceded the valley glaciation or was concurrent with it, and eventually a blockage resulted in a reversal of the water flow. The mile-thick Sanpoil sublobe, branching from the Cordilleran Okanogan lobe ice sheet, pushed south along the valley and over the entire mass of Gibraltar Mountain. Umpleby noted that mountain tops in the district had glacial striations showing a 5°–7° west of north directionality. Additionally, the mountains have polished faces, rounded summits, and a north-south elongation of features resulting from glacial carving.

== Ecology ==
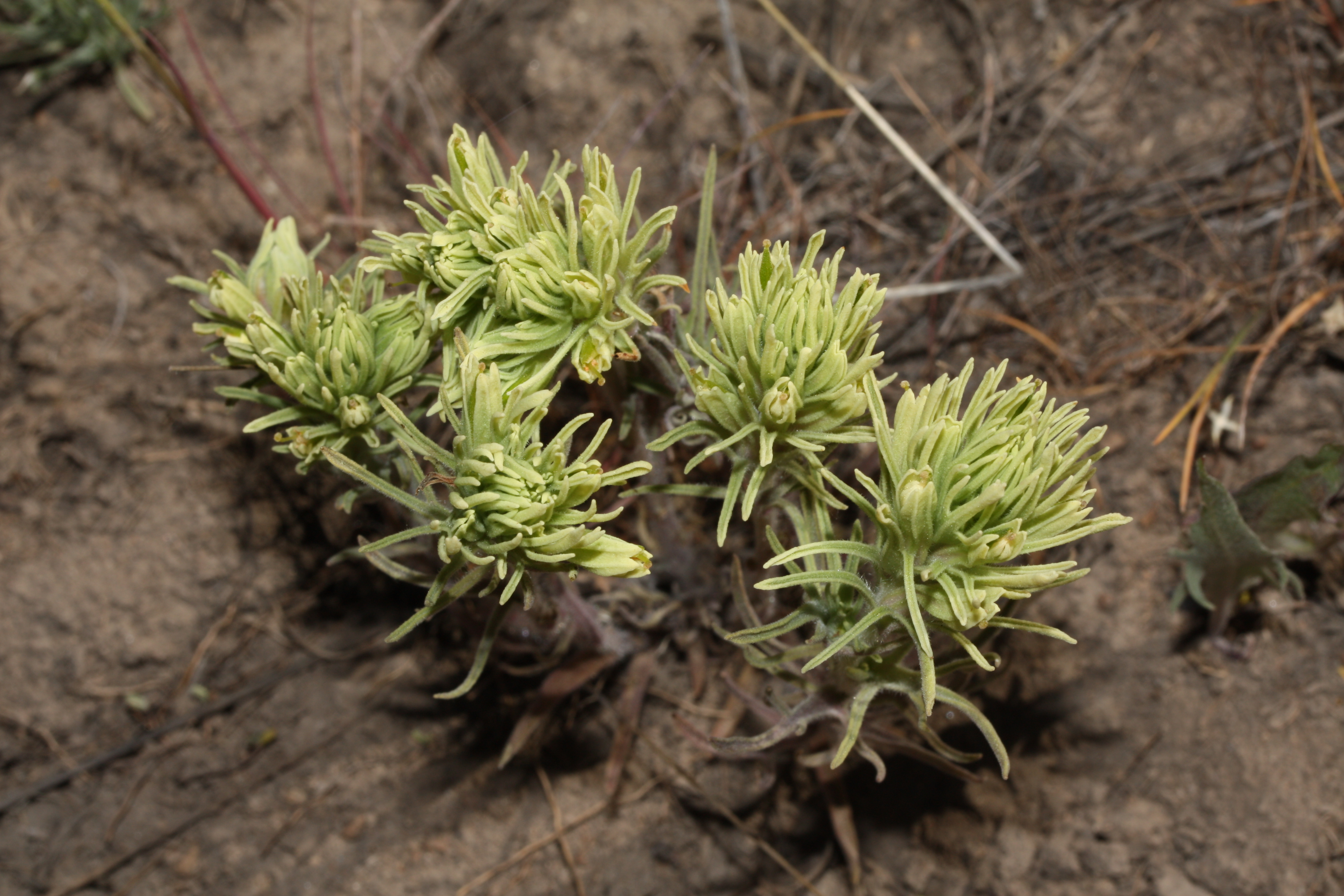
Thompson's paintbrush

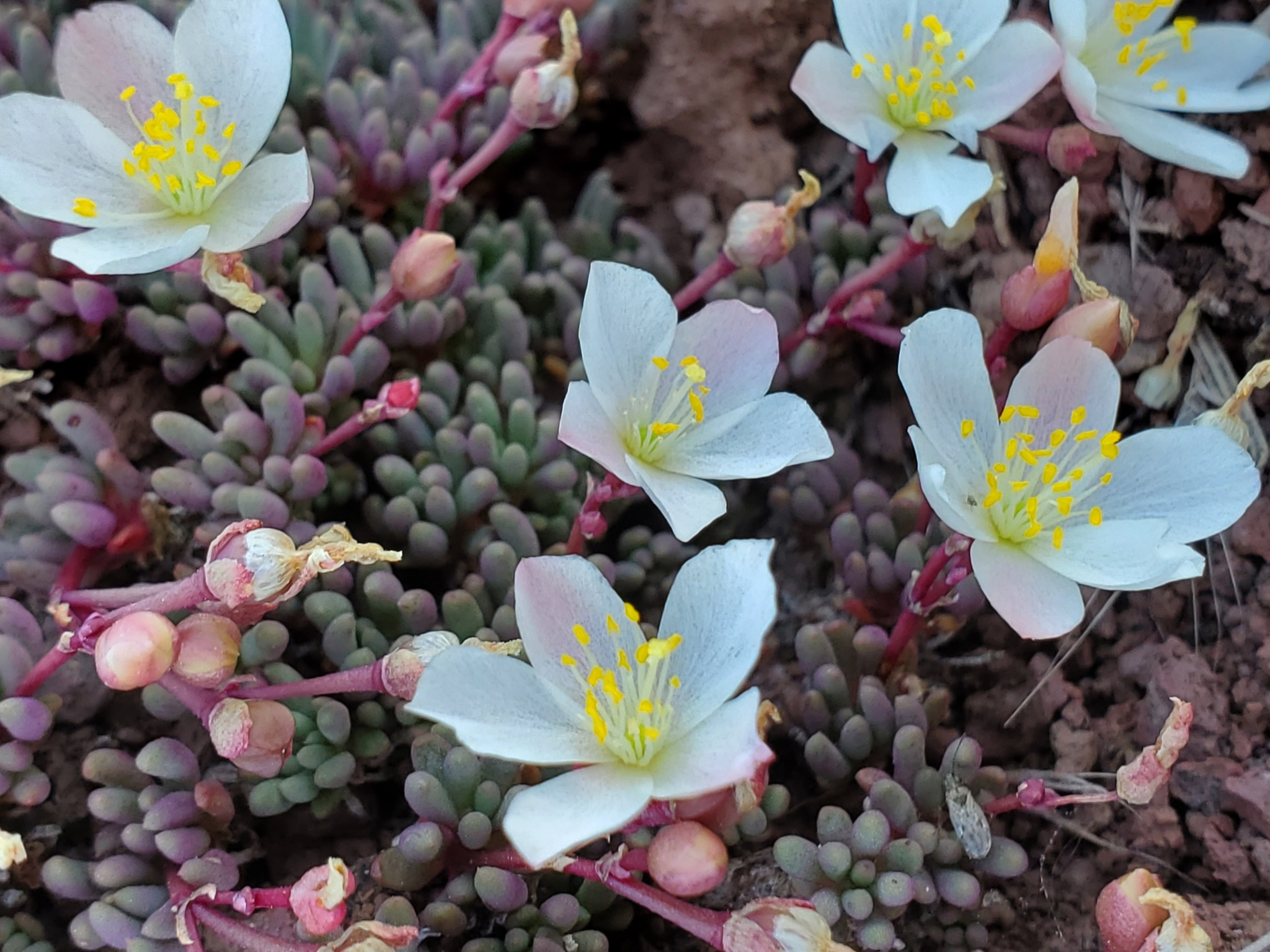
Okanogan fameflower

native flowers

Gibraltar Mountain's north-facing slopes are dominated by thick Ponderosa Pine with intermingled Douglas fir and sporadic western larch; shrubs include wax currant. A suite of various lichen species grows on the slopes and peak. These include: blistered rock tripe, brown-eyed sunshine lichen, Tuckermannopsis chlorophylla, disc lichen, forked tube lichen, hammered shield lichen, Nodobryoria abbreviata, punctured rock-tripe, shrubby sunburst lichen, split-peg lichen, Toninia squalida, tundra saucer lichen, Kaernefeltia merrillii, Cetraria platyphylla, and Cetraria sepincola.

The mountain hosts several parasitic or hemiparasitic species, Thompson's paintbrush plus the broomrape Aphyllon purpureum. Monocots include onespike oatgrass and spikenard sedge.

Gibraltar is one of the few locations in Washington state where the Columbia Mountains–endemic Okanogan fameflower grows.

A number of flowering herbs also live across the various ecosystems of the mountain. These include: yellow alyssum, pearly pussytoes, rush pussytoes, umber pussytoes, heartleaf arnica, twin arnica, dwarf mountain fleabane, desert yellow fleabane, Douglas' buckwheat, rock buckwheat, northern rough fescue, yellow fritillary, prairie smoke, coral bells, western stoneseed, Wyeth biscuitroot, biscuitroot, Geyer's biscuitroot, bigseed lomatium, nineleaf biscuitroot, sagebrush false dandelion, linear-leaved phacelia, spiny phlox, meadow death camas, thyme-leaved speedwell, and Canadian white violet.

== Wildfires ==
The greater Okanogan Highlands are subject to yearly fire seasons, with the 1955 wildfire season involving three lightning-ignited fires in the Gibraltar and Iron Mountain areas. The 2015 Ferry County, Washington Community Wildfire Protection Plan classifies Gibraltar Mountain into three specific fire regimes based on the frequency that fires have occurred. Fire Regime I is present in the upper elevations, and Regime III for the majority of the lower slopes, but there are also small pockets of Regime IV areas. Regime I areas are historically subjected to low to moderate severity fires more frequently than every 35 years. In regime III areas, the fire severity is still low to moderate, but the fire occurrence is between 35 and 200 years. For regime VI the interval is between 35 and 200 years, but the severity is high, fully burning existing forest stands, requiring a full replacement of the flora afterwards.

The community protection plan classifies the flora on the mountain into groups based on how much an area has departed from historic fire regimes. Most of the mountain is considered Vegetation Condition Class I, showing little departure from normal fire history, though the western slopes facing the Sanpoil Valley and Republic are Class II, with a moderate drift from historic norm. A few isolated pockets of Class III are on the eastern slopes, with high departure from historic fire regime. Due to the mountain's proximity to Republic, and State Route 20, most of the mountain mass is considered a "high population" or transitional wildland–urban interface area. In combination with vegetation and fire regime status, Gibraltar has a high to moderate fire threat level. The majority of the mountain is within Ferry County Fire district #13, with some of the southern reaches abutting lands managed by Colville National Forest or Washington State Department of Natural Resources fire teams.

== Climate ==
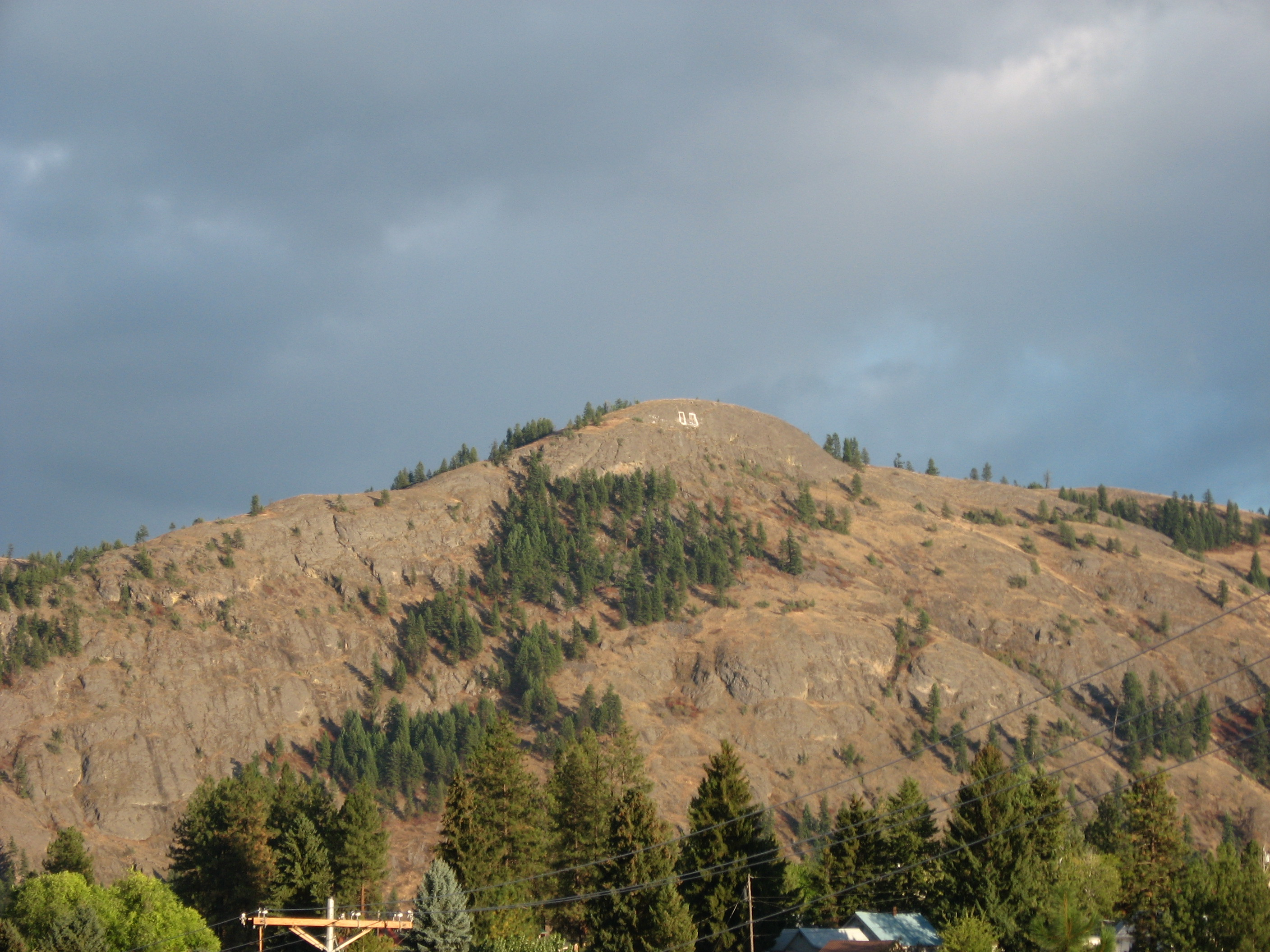
Gibraltar's west face with graduation year painted on face

Within the Köppen climate classification the area of northern Ferry County has a humid continental climate (Dfb). The 30-year average temperature is 44 °F (7 °C), with an average yearly high of 81.2 °F (27.3 °C) in August, and an average low of 17.8 °F (−7.9 °C) in December. The average rainfall is 18.99 in (482 mm) per year. The wettest month is December, with 2.38 in (60 mm) of precipitation, while the driest is August, with 0.67 in (17 mm).

Climate data for Gibraltar Mountain 48.6233 N, −118.7147 W, Elevation: 3,097 ft (944 m) (1991–2020 normals)
Month	Jan	Feb	Mar	Apr	May	Jun	Jul	Aug	Sep	Oct	Nov	Dec	Year
Mean daily maximum °F (°C)	31.1 (−0.5)	36.5 (2.5)	45.5 (7.5)	55.3 (12.9)	64.9 (18.3)	70.9 (21.6)	80.7 (27.1)	81.2 (27.3)	71.5 (21.9)	55.1 (12.8)	38.4 (3.6)	29.3 (−1.5)	55.0 (12.8)
Daily mean °F (°C)	24.1 (−4.4)	28.1 (−2.2)	35.5 (1.9)	43.4 (6.3)	52.1 (11.2)	57.9 (14.4)	65.5 (18.6)	65.5 (18.6)	56.8 (13.8)	44.0 (6.7)	31.6 (−0.2)	23.5 (−4.7)	44.0 (6.7)
Mean daily minimum °F (°C)	18.0 (−7.8)	19.6 (−6.9)	25.4 (−3.7)	31.4 (−0.3)	39.2 (4.0)	44.9 (7.2)	50.2 (10.1)	49.7 (9.8)	42.1 (5.6)	32.9 (0.5)	24.8 (−4.0)	17.8 (−7.9)	33.0 (0.5)
Average precipitation inches (mm)	1.76 (45)	1.32 (34)	1.59 (40)	1.41 (36)	2.20 (56)	2.29 (58)	1.27 (32)	0.67 (17)	0.86 (22)	1.26 (32)	1.97 (50)	2.38 (60)	18.98 (482)
Source: PRISM Climate Group

== Human usage ==
The mountain has been used by the Boy Scouts of Republic to hold rescue training drills and fulfill hiking badge requirements. In the 1950s, a group of 22 Republic Boy Scouts from Troop 61 used the mountain for various badge qualifications and to practice a lost hiker carry-out rescue drill. The Gibraltar Recreation Center, a community facility named for the mountain, was first started in the late 1980s. Construction stalled for a decade before almost restarting in the 1990s. Community dissent on use and funding issues in both the late 1980s and late 1990s killed the project. Volunteers with the Washington Trails Association helped with the construction of the Gibraltar Mountain trail network in 2011 in the Republic Ranger District. Several mine leases are located in the vicinity of Gibraltar. The leases are platted on sites of possible epithermal precious metal mineralization related to the Republic Mining District gold systems. One of the running board paintings on the Ferry County Carousel is a painting of Gibraltar, titled "Big Gib". The carousel is part of the Ferry County Fairgrounds at the base of Gibraltar in Pine Grove.
