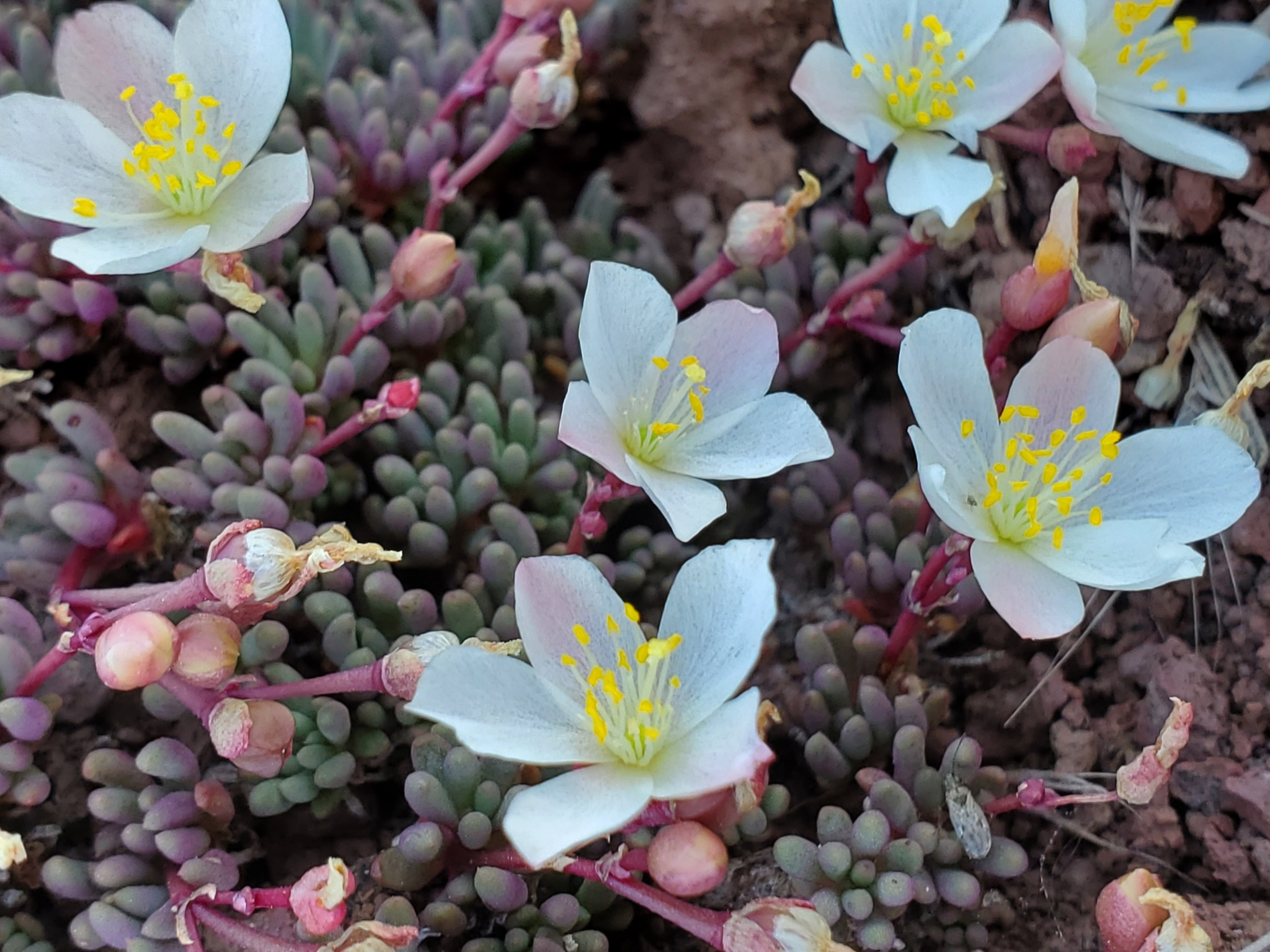
- Blooming Okanogan fameflower, Knutsford, British Columbia

Conservation status
- Apparently Secure (NatureServe)

Scientific classification
- Kingdom: Plantae
- Clade: Tracheophytes
- Clade: Angiosperms
- Clade: Eudicots
- Order: Caryophyllales
- Family: Montiaceae
- Genus: Phemeranthus
- Species: P. sediformis

Binomial name
- Phemeranthus sediformis (Poelln.) Kiger

Synonyms
- Talinum okanoganense C. S. English; Talinum sediforme Poelln.; Talinum wayae Eastwood

= Phemeranthus sediformis =

Species of flowering plant

Phemeranthus sediformis, commonly called Okanagan fameflower, is a species of flowering plant in the montia family Montiaceae. It is native to the Okanagan Highlands and Kettle River Range in north central Washington state, United States, and south central British Columbia, Canada. Populations are confined to elevations between 800 and 1,500 m (2,600 and 4,900 ft) on south to southwest facing rocky slopes, outcrops, and knolls. The first specimens were collected by John Jeffrey in 1851, but the species was not named until 1933–1934 when a series of three separate papers describing the plant were published. The species is one of Canada's most range-restricted plants. Despite the small native range, it transplants and adapts easily to gardens and has been part of rock garden and alpine garden seed catalogues for a number of years.

== Description ==
Phemeranthus sediformis plants are herbaceous perennials with a low growing habit and sprawling nature. The taproot is thick in the middle to upper portions with a forking lower portion. They have a thick stem that branches above the soil line into a rounded crown of branching stems. The plant crown, which is up to 12 cm (4.7 in) wide, comprises numerous branched stems with leaf cushions typically less than 5 cm (2.0 in) wide. The 1.5–3 mm (0.059–0.118 in) thick individual stems are upturned from the ground, raising anywhere between 5–10 cm (2.0–3.9 in) into the air.

There are no full leaves on the lower portions of the branches, rather the midribs of older leaves harden and while the majority of the leaf is deciduous and decays, the midrib stays on as a bristle. New leaves each year grow from near the stem tips in an alternating pattern towards the stem tip. Each leaf is fleshy and nearly round in cross section, with an elongated linear profile and a smooth shiny surface. They range between 1–2 mm (0.039–0.079 in) in diameter and have a length ranging between 5–12 mm (0.20–0.47 in).

There are small bracts present at the bases of the flowers' stalks. The flowers are born in spreading clusters ranging from three to nine in number with flat tops. The flowers are born on peduncles 2–3 cm (0.79–1.18 in) length branching at the top into a branched cyme 2–3 cm (0.79–1.18 in) long. Each flower has two orbicular sepals of 3 mm (0.12 in) each. The petals are usually sets of five, with coloration typically white to cream, although pink and yellow are occasionally present. Individual petals have a broad ovate outline and reach between 6–8 mm (0.24–0.31 in) in length. Between 15 and 30 stamens have been reported and the style is split into three equal branches. The flowers are ephemeral, lasting only a short period and withering quickly. The fruits mature into capsules between 2.8–3.2 mm (0.11–0.13 in) with shining black seeds that are 0.8–1 mm (0.031–0.039 in) long.

== Taxonomy ==
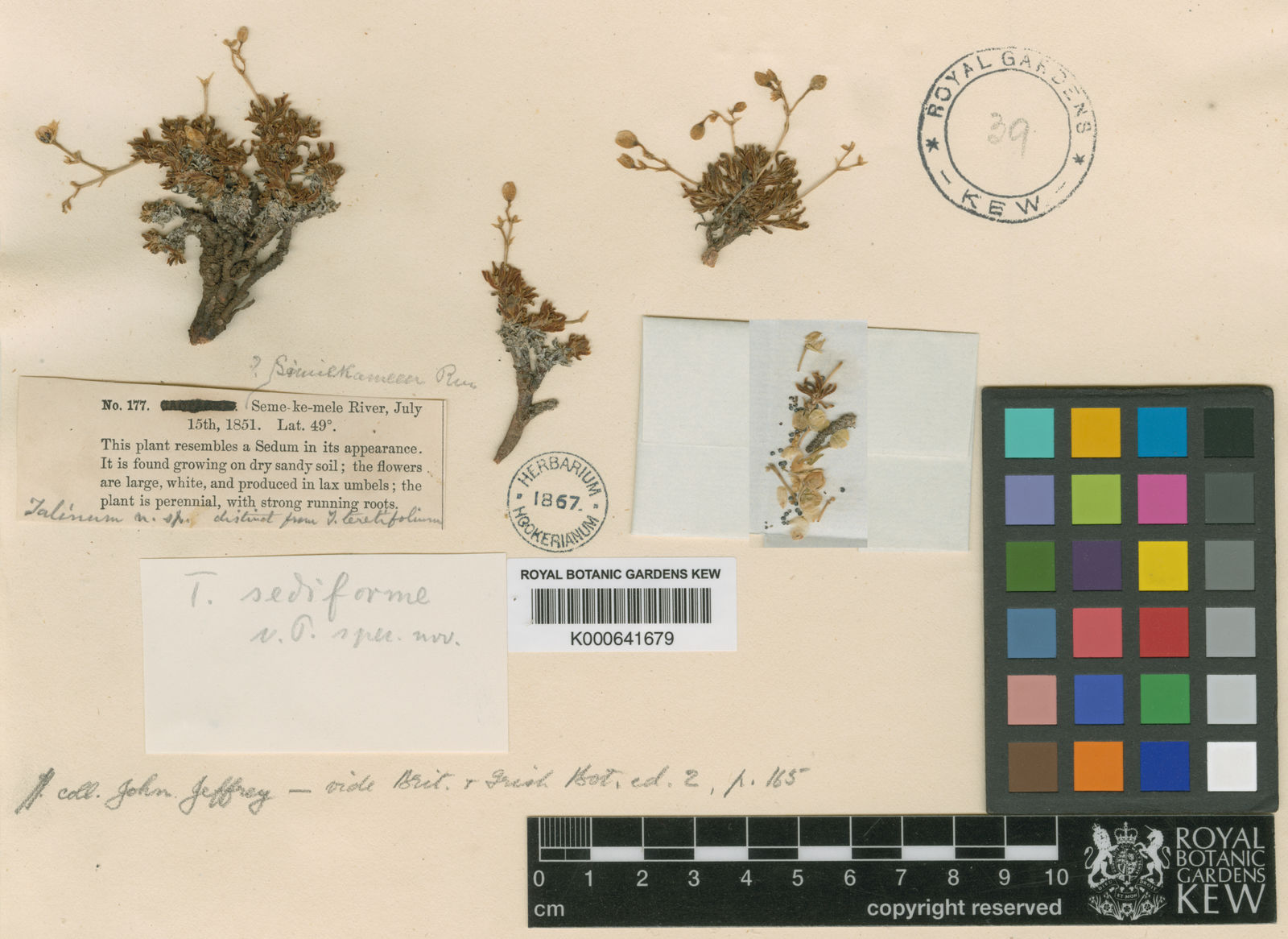
Talinum sediformis Holotype herbarium specimen

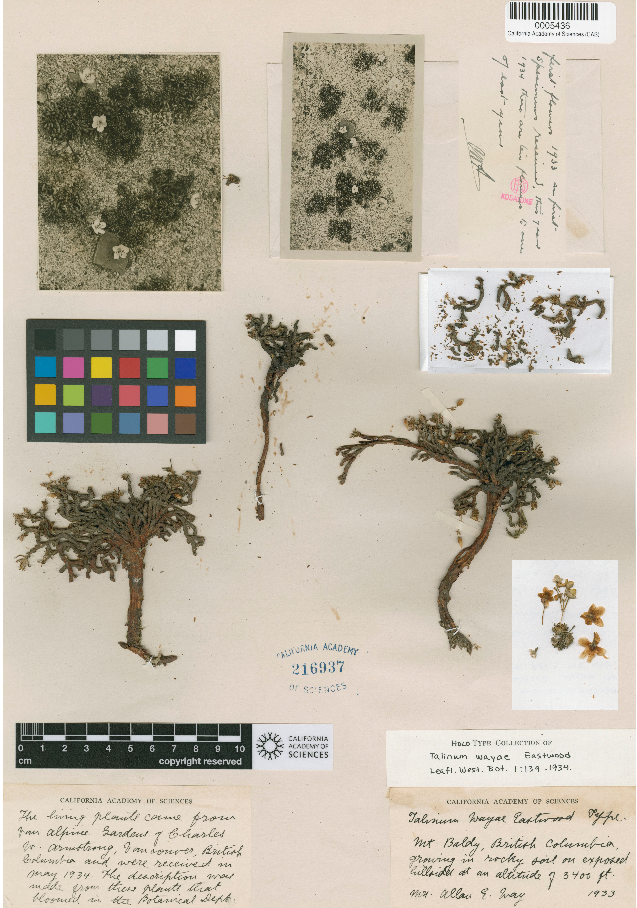
Talinum wayae Holotype herbarium specimen

Specimens of Phemeranthus sediformis were collected by Scottish botanist John Jeffrey during his visit to the southern interior of British Columbia in 1851. Hired by a Scottish group known as the "Oregon Botanical Association" to continue the botanical work of David Douglas and extend the work beyond the areas explored by Douglas, in 1850 Jeffrey had arrived in British Columbia and after overwintering had crossed the British Columbian Rocky Mountains to reach the Columbia River. He travelled downstream along the Columbia to the Okanogan River and then north up that river to the "Seme-ke-mele" (Similkameen) region, arriving at the junction of the Similkameen and Tulameen Rivers by July 9. On July 15, 1851 (misreported by Poellnitz as June 15), somewhere along the Similkameen River, Jeffrey collected what would become the holotype for Phemeranthus sediformis. It was shipped with the other botanical material collected back to Scotland and likely dispersed to members of the Oregon Botanical Association. The P. sediformis specimen was eventually deposited in the Kew Herbarium Hookerianum collections as specimen K000641679 in 1867.

The specimen was not described and named in detail until 1933 when German botanists Karl von Poellnitz described a number of succulent species. He placed the new species into the genus Talinum while noting that the current descriptions of species prevented him from accepting the division of the genus into the sections Phemeranthus and Talinastrum.

On May 27–28, 1933, the same year that Poellnitz described his species, United States Army Corps of Engineers botanist Carl S. English Jr. collected several specimens of the same plant from two locations in Washington State. Both plants were found in the mountainous Okanogan Highlands area of Okanogan County, on Fir Mountain at 5,666 ft (1,727 m), and on the ridge west of the Granite Creek/Sweet Creek confluence near the eastern edge of the county. The plants were transplanted to the garden of English's Seattle-area home and the specimen he chose to use in describing what he thought would be a new species came from the garden on August 10, 1933. English published his October 2, 1934, description of Talinum okanoganense in the Proceedings of The Biological Society of Washington. This was the binomial by which the species was most frequently known until Robert W. Kigers's 2001 revision of the species.

At the same time that English was working on his paper, Canadian–American botanist Alice Eastwood was also working on plants from the Columbia Mountains. While exploring the area around Brigade Lake south of her home in Kamloops during 1924, K. C. Way came across a population of the plants and collected a number that she transplanted into her yard as a rockery garden. Over the next decade Way traded and gifted plants to homes across the Northwest. On a separate collecting trip she explored the slopes of Mount Baldy northeast of Osoyoos, where she collected specimens which she traded to Charles W. Armstrong. Based on specimens that came to her from Armstrong, proprietor of Van Stone Gardens in Vancouver, Eastwood described her new species. The formal description was based on a traded plant that later flowered in the California Academy of Sciences botanical garden. The plant was then collected as the holotype and added it to the herbarium collection as specimen number 216937. She published her formal description in the November 1934 issue of the journal Leaflets of Western Botany just two months after English's description appeared, making it a synonym of his species.

By the late 1990s, the monophyletic nature of genus Talinum was in question. Phemeranthus had been treated as a section within Talinum traditionally, and since the description of the type species, Phemeranthus teretifolius, other North American species had been described and placed into the section. The North American species all presented a number of characters in common that were not seen in the old world species. Robert W. Kiger reviewed the North American Talinum species in 2001 as a preparation for the publication of the Flora of North America section on Portulacaceae. He deemed that nearly all the valid species were in fact distinct enough as a group to raise Phemeranthus to the status of full genus. Among the revisions to the species, Kiger noted that Poellnitz's P. sediformis had nomenclatural priority over English's and Eastwood's names, which he listed as junior synonyms. Kiger attempted to locate Poellnitz's holotype herbarium specimen, but was not able to do so at that time due to his assumption that the specimen was part of the Berlin Botanical Garden and Botanical Museum. He was able to locate one of the isotype sheets in the Kew collections.

== Etymology ==
Poellnitz specifically noted the etymology sediformis as a reference to the Kew Herbarium label attached to the specimen he described. The label describes the specimen as a "Plant resembling a Sedum". English, in choosing his name, opted to coin a toponym as the epithet of the species. Given that the type locality for his plants was in the Okanogan Highlands of eastern Okanogan County, he chose to name the species okanoganense while acknowledging that the names derive from the Syilx peoples, Okanagan or Okinagan, whose territory the land was originally. Eastwood chose to craft a matronym, Talinum wayae, honoring K. C. Way of Kamloops, British Columbia. The name is in recognition of Way for discovering the species on Mt. Baldy, British Columbia in 1924.

== Distribution ==
Phemeranthus sediformis is distributed along areas of the Columbia Mountains in southwest central British Columbia, Canada, and northern central Washington State in the US. As of 1994, fewer than 20 known populations had been identified encompassing an estimated total area of 8,000 km^{2} (3,100 sq mi). 7,000 km^{2} (2,700 sq mi) of this was in British Columbia and only 1,000 km^{2} (390 sq mi) in Washington. Populations are known as far north as Opax Hill to the northwest of Kamloops. The western-most populations are in the Walhachin area west of Kamloops Lake, while the eastern-most British Columbian populations are above Okanagan Lake. The Washington state populations are located to the east of the British Columbian ones, and are confined to the eastern portion of Okanogan County and northern Ferry County and a total of less than 10 sites are identified in publications, with the southern most sites found to the north of Thirteen Mile Creek. Phemeranthus sediformis is the only member of the genus native to Canada, and one of the most restricted Canadian native plants.

It has been noted that P. sediformis has a range which less than 15,000 years ago was engulfed by the Cordilleran ice sheet in the north and by the Okanogan and Sanpoil glacial sublobes in the south. The Fraser Glaciation swept most if not all vascular plants from the elevations under 1,500–2,000 m (4,900–6,600 ft). In a 1994 paper by naturalists Trevor Goward and Helen Knight, it was suggested that populations of P. sediformis retreated from the glaciation and survived in more southerly glacial refugia areas before spreading back north following the glacial retreat into the modern range while disappearing from the refugia. The reason for the loss of the refugia populations is possibly due to climate shifting from habitable or being outcompeted by other xeric plants such as cacti.

== Ecology ==
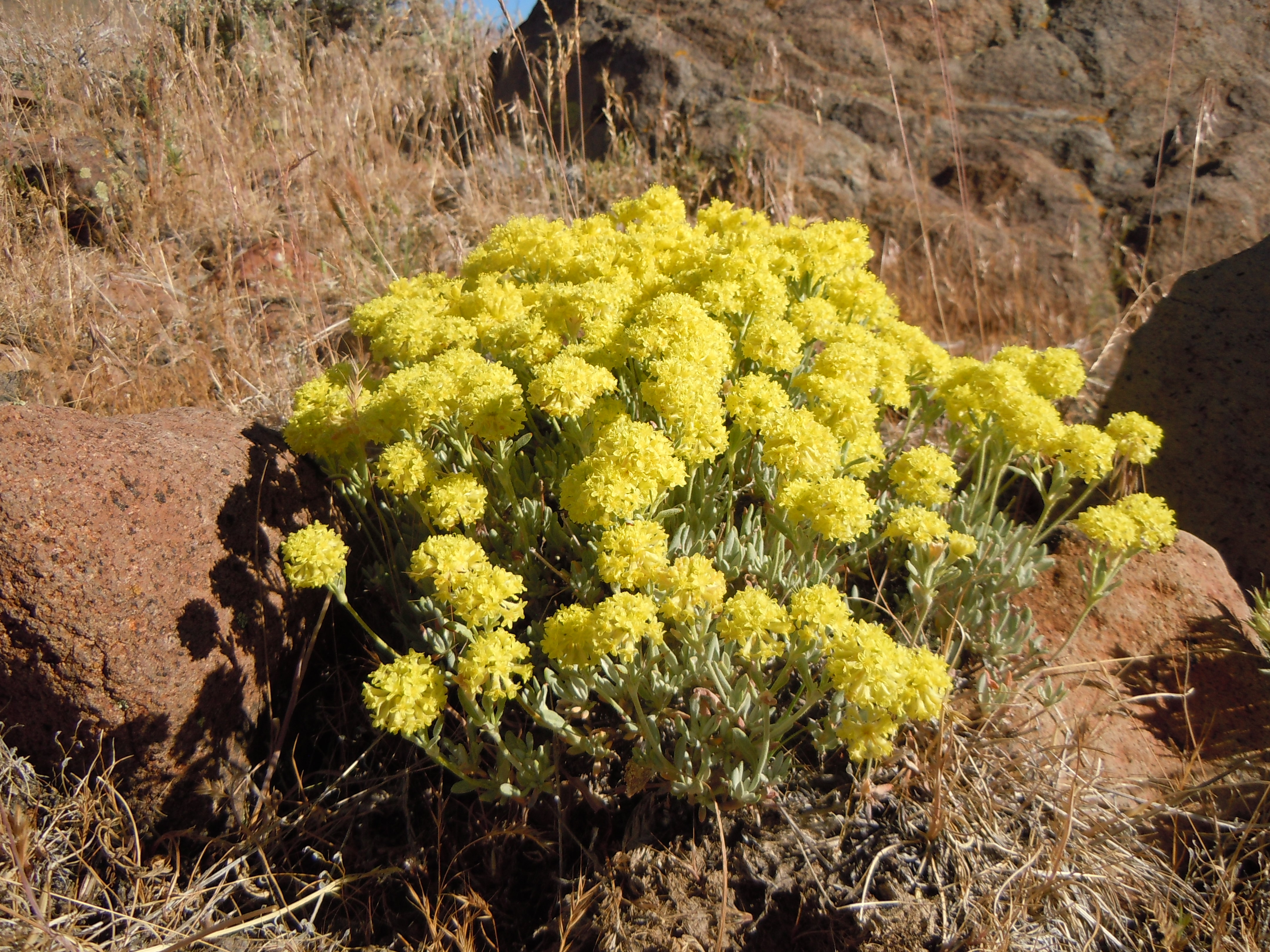
Douglas' buckwheat, an associated floral community species

Within the range of P. sediformis, it is found at elevations between 800–1,500 m (2,600–4,900 ft) on south to southwesterly facing slopes. The preferred habitat is on the eroding edges and slopes of hills and mountains where broken up rocky outcroppings are exposed. In these areas the plants colonize well-drained shallow soils derived from weathered volcanic rock. The regosols of these habitats are noted to be similar to the serpentine soils that other Phemeranthus species prefer.

The climate is considered to be a mild continental climate where the overall temperature range in a year is about 25 °C (77 °F). The most northerly sites in the region of Kamloops experience seasonal lows around −6 °C (21 °F) during winter, while the summer high temperatures are an upper average of 20.9 °C (69.6 °F). While precipitation is spread fairly uniformly over the year, there are small peaks in the early summer and in the winter. It has been suggested that the occurrences of rain from summer afternoon thunderstorms may play a factor in the lower elevational limits of the plants. Under this theory, there is too much precipitation evaporating before it reaches the ground below 800 m (2,600 ft) to allow the plants to survive the dry conditions during the summer months.

Within the Kettle River Range of Washington, P. sediformis is a noted component of the Douglas's buckwheat/Sandberg's bluegrass floral community. This community is restricted to loam soils that are derived from or impacted by surface weathered andesite rock, and are restricted in range due to the relatively rare occurrence of soils in the region. Plants within the community include the shrubby mountain big sagebrush and the perennial herbs arrowleaf balsamroot, arrowleaf buckwheat, bigseed biscuitroot, bitterroot, brittle bladderfern, blue bunchgrass, bluebunch wheatgrass, deer paintbrush, Holbøll's rockcress, limestone hawksbeard, meadow death camas, narrow leaved fleabane, nodding microseris, parsnip-flower Buckwheat, tufted phlox, upland larkspur, wallaces spikemoss, wyeth biscuitroot, and yellow fritillary.

== Conservation ==
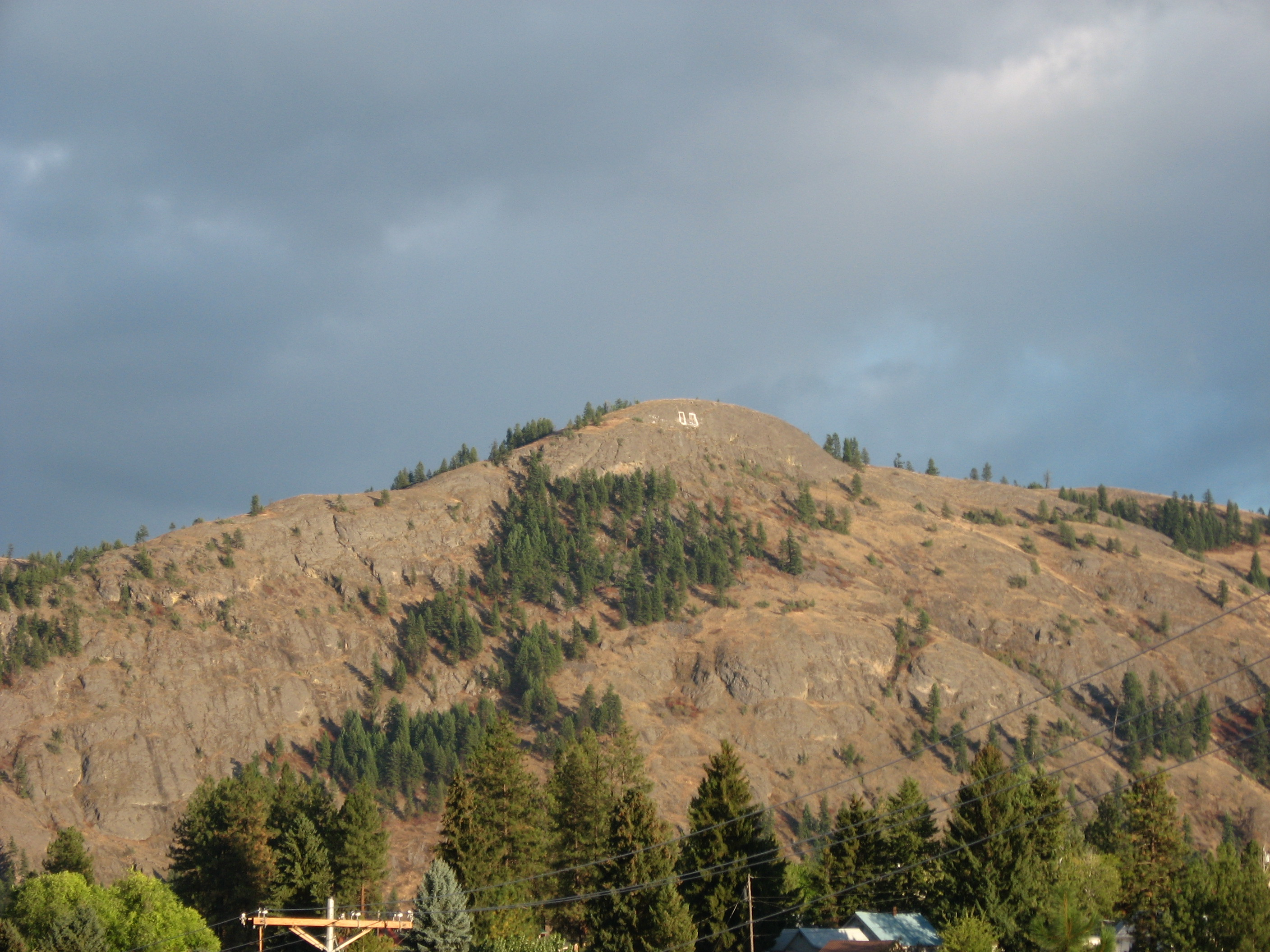
Gibraltar Mountain overlooking Republic

Phemeranthus sediformis distribution has been noted to be rather scattered and within known populations, the population acreage varies from 10 m^{2} (110 sq ft) to 60,000 m^{2} (650,000 sq ft), and the estimated total number of wild plants in 1994 was approximately 24,588. The populations in general were considered well established with old mature plants and new to yearling plants present. Most of the species is considered of least concern for human threat, however several of the largest populations are found close to large cites such as Kelowna and Kamloops, exposing the plants to possible damage from human activities. The threatened populations are considered most likely to be vulnerable to damage from recreational activity such as all terrain vehicle use. In the southern end of the species range, a number of populations have been identified in Republic, Washington and the surrounding area such as on Gibraltar Mountain overlooking the Sanpoil valley to the immediate south of Republic. A small group of plants have been planted on the Colville Ranger District headquarters grounds in Republic proper.

Beginning in the 1920's Phemeranthus sediformis was noted to be tolerant of transplanting and cultivation within rock gardening. K. C. Way traded a number of specimens to various interested parties including Charles Armstrong. In the following decades seeds began to be listed in the catalogs of various North American rock and alpine garden dealers.
