= Gibraltar Mountain =

Gibraltar Mountain may refer to:

- Gibraltar Mountain (Alberta) in Alberta, Canada
- Gibraltar Mountain (Arizona) in Arizona, USA
- Gibraltar Mountain (Washington) in North Central Washington State

== See also ==
- Mount Gibraltar
- Gibraltar Range
- Rock of Gibraltar
