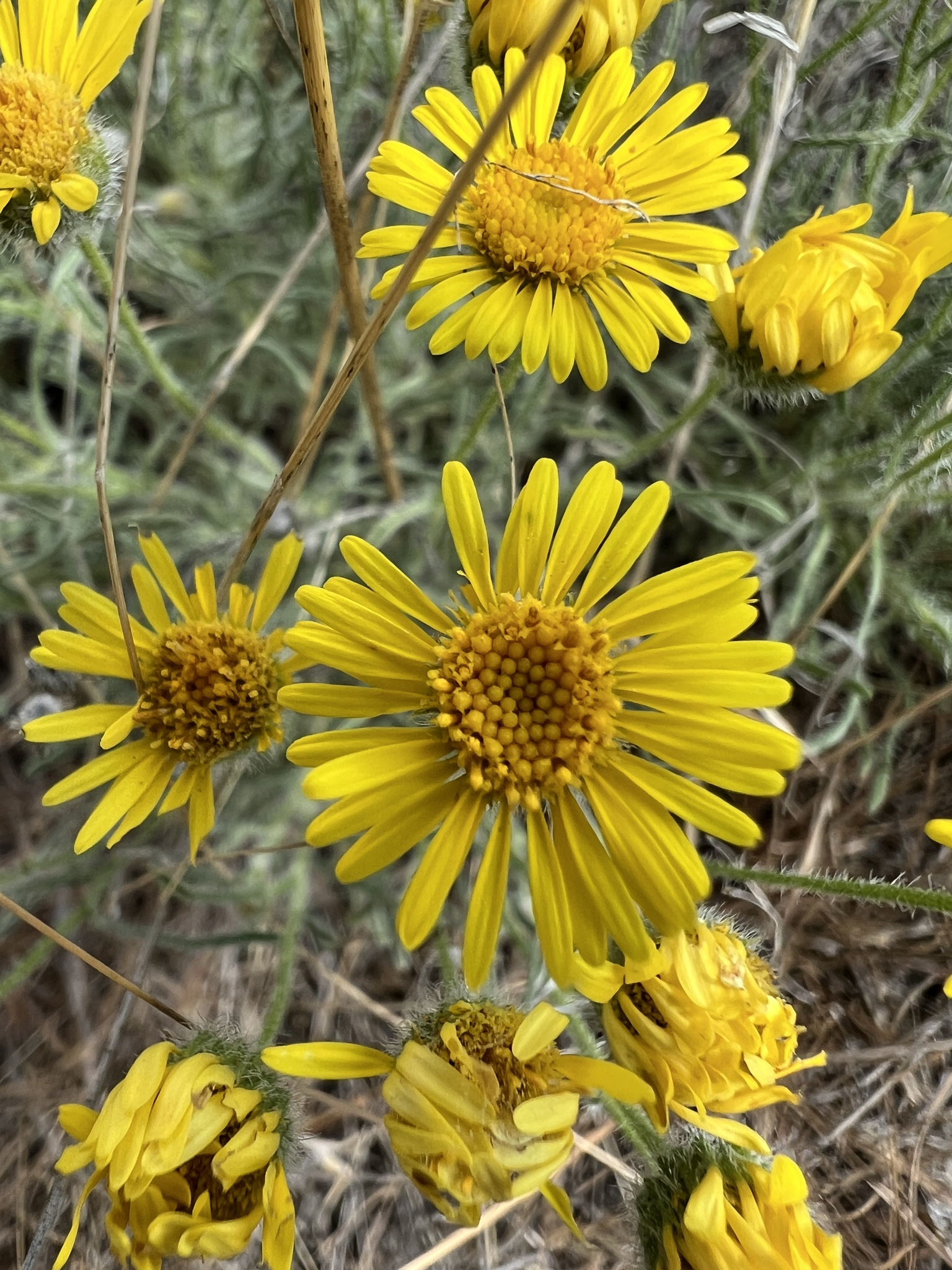
- In Richland, Washington

Scientific classification
- Kingdom: Plantae
- Clade: Tracheophytes
- Clade: Angiosperms
- Clade: Eudicots
- Clade: Asterids
- Order: Asterales
- Family: Asteraceae
- Genus: Erigeron
- Species: E. piperianus

Binomial name
- Erigeron piperianus Cronquist

= Erigeron piperianus =

Species of flowering plant

Erigeron piperianus is a species of flowering plant in the family Asteraceae known by the common name Piper's fleabane. It has been found only in the state of Washington in the northwestern United States.

Erigeron piperianus is a small perennial herb rarely more than 12 centimeters (4.8 inches) tall, producing a woody taproot. The leaves are linear to narrowly oblanceolate, are 2 to 4 cm long, and are sparsely covered in bristly appearing hairs (hispid). The plant produces many stems, but with only 1 flower head per stem. Each head has 25–40 yellow ray florets surrounding numerous yellow disc florets. The plant grows in dry, open, relatively flat land, often with sagebrush. It can be differentiated from the more widespread Erigeron linearis by its smaller size and the presence of sparse but prominent bristle-like hairs on the leaves, especially the lower part.
