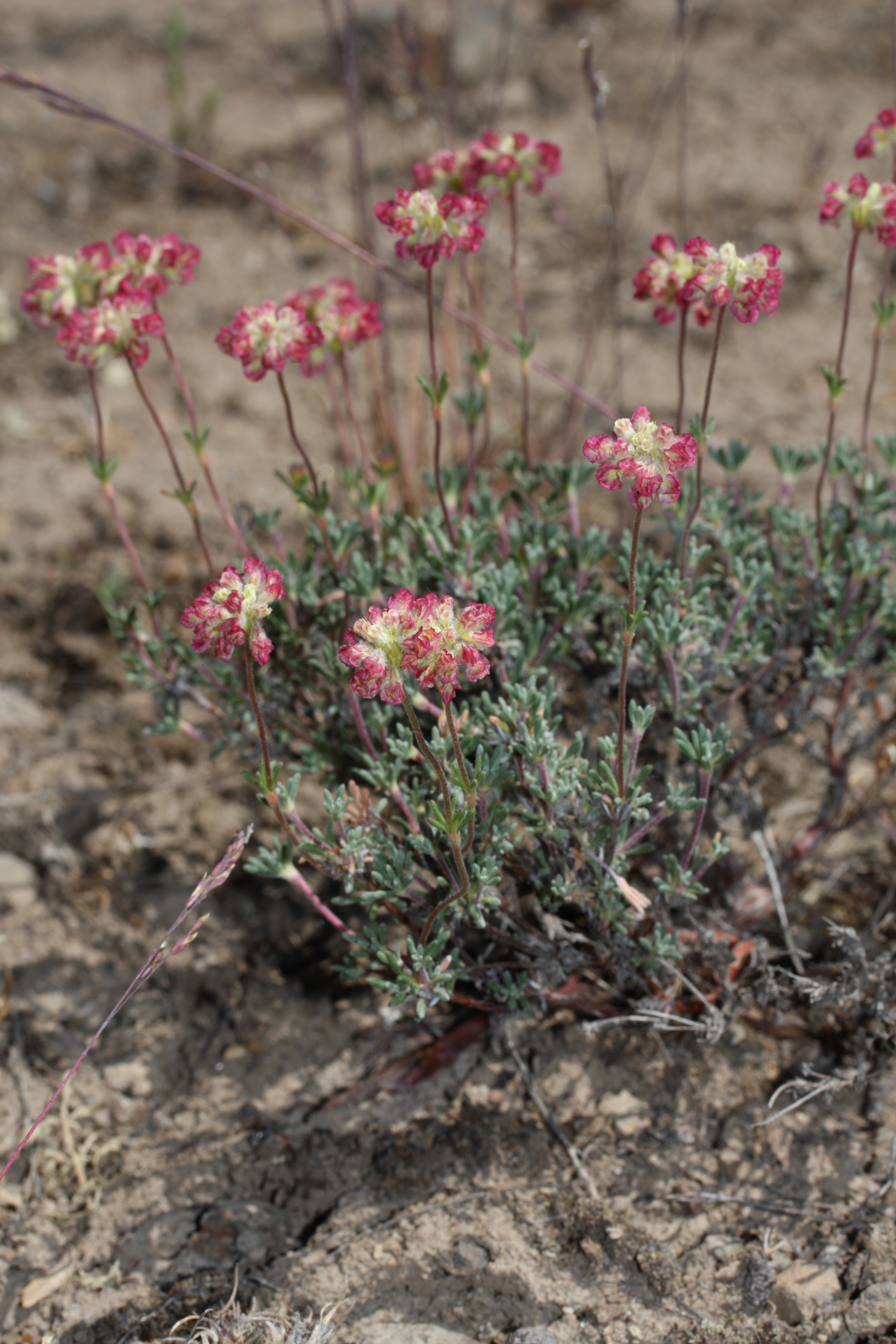

Scientific classification
- Kingdom: Plantae
- Clade: Tracheophytes
- Clade: Angiosperms
- Clade: Eudicots
- Order: Caryophyllales
- Family: Polygonaceae
- Genus: Eriogonum
- Species: E. thymoides

Binomial name
- Eriogonum thymoides Benth.

= Eriogonum thymoides =

Species of wild buckwheat

Eriogonum thymoides is a species of flowering plant in the buckwheat family known by the common name thymeleaf wild buckwheat, or simply thymeleaf buckwheat.

== Description ==
Eriogonum thymoides is an intricately branched subshrub with foliage up to 15 centimetres (5.9 in) tall and 40 centimetres (16 in) wide and covered in short woolly or silky hairs. Younger plants usually have a very neat compact appearance, and older plants may have a gnarled woody base and may be somewhat taller and may sprawl extensively. The hairy leaves are linear to spatulate and flat or rolled under at the edges and up to 1.0 cm in length. It produces erect flowering stems that project up to 12 centimetres (4.7 in) above the foliage. Each flower stem has a whorl of small bract-like leaves near the midpoint and is topped by a head-like inflorescence up to 2 cm wide. The flower is up to 1 cm long and is variable in color, including yellow, white and rosy red, yellow and rosy red, and white. In bud, the flowers are often deep rosy red. The bases of the petals and sepals are covered with long hairs. The species is polygamodioecious, meaning that some of the plants have both male and bisexual flowers, while others have both female and bisexual flowers. Eriogonum thymoides can be distinguished from the similar to Eriogonum douglasii by its (usually) smaller leaf size, and by its involucre lobes, which are erect and appressed in E. thymoides, and spreading to reflexed in E. douglasii (the involucre is the bract that envelopes the base of the flower head). The leaves of E. douglasii are also often flatter, wider, and more silvery in color.

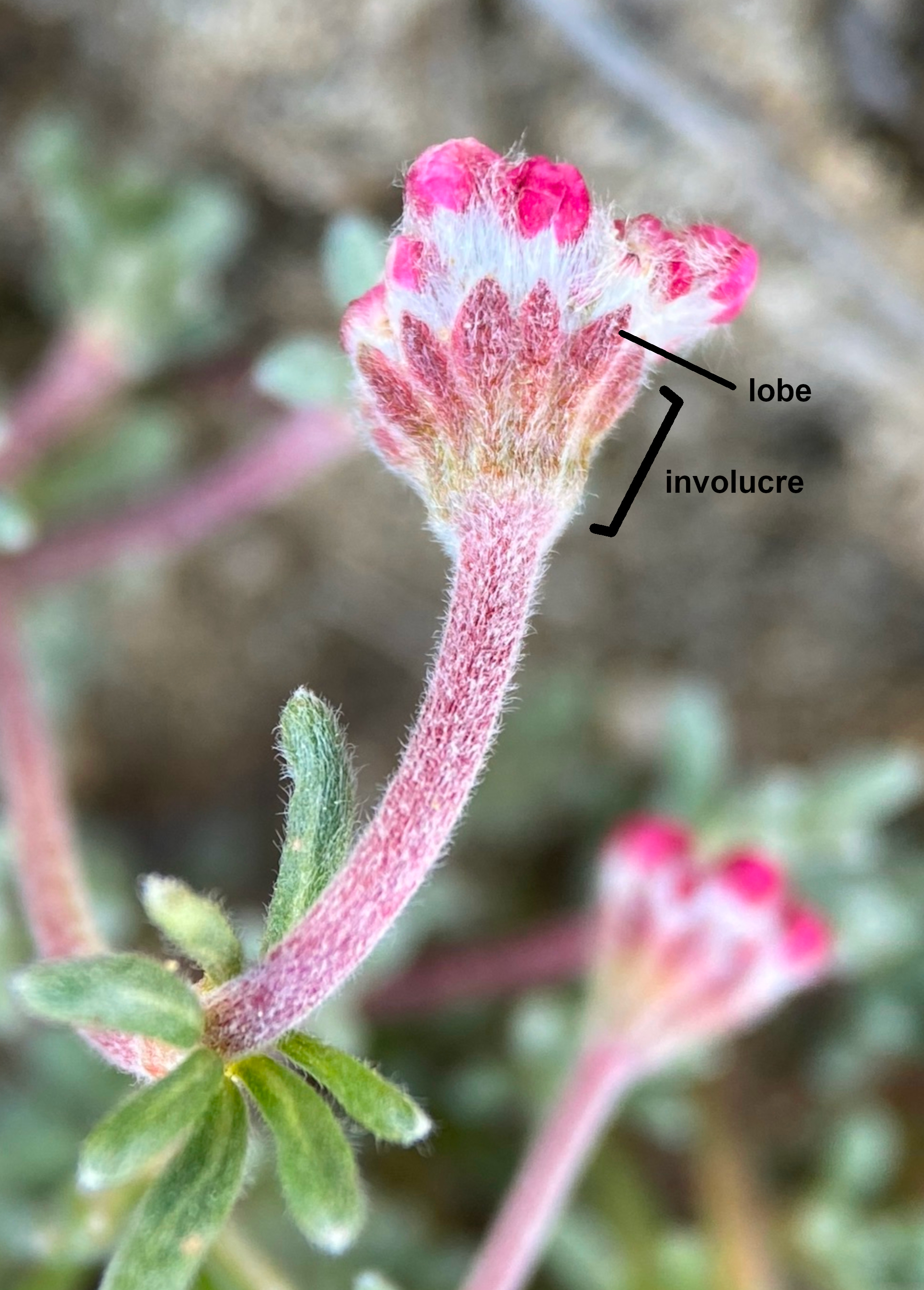
Eriogonum thymoides flower head in bud

== Range and Habitat ==
Eriogonum thymoides is native to dry regions of Idaho, Oregon, and Washington in the Pacific Northwest of the United States, where there are three main population groups. It flowers in mid-spring. This plant grows in sagebrush, ponderosa pine forest openings, and mountain ridges, often on very shallow rocky soil above basalt. Though it grows in a restricted region it is locally abundant.

== Uses ==
According to one source, this plant has "special value to native bees."

== Gallery ==
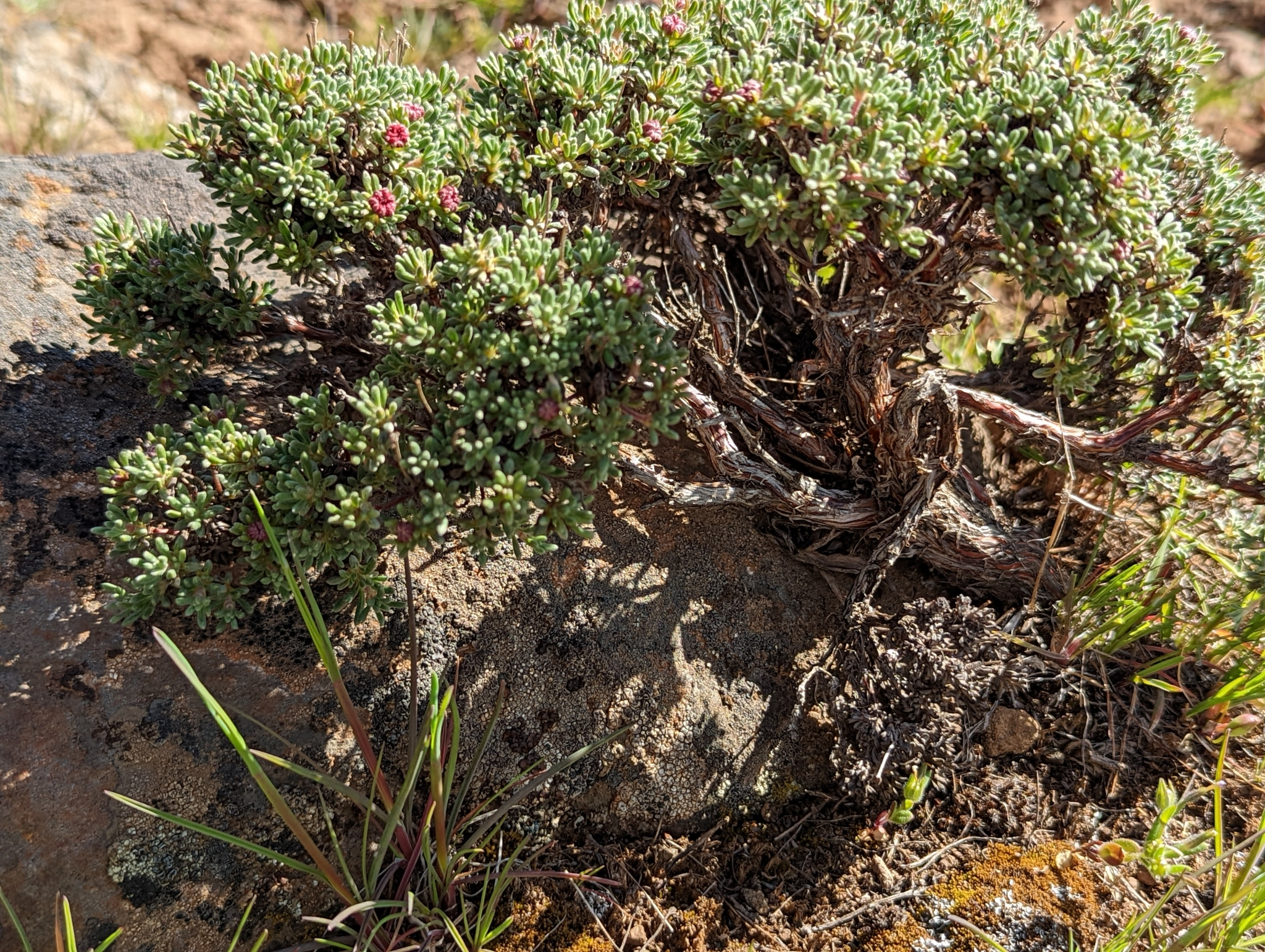
Old plant with thick woody base

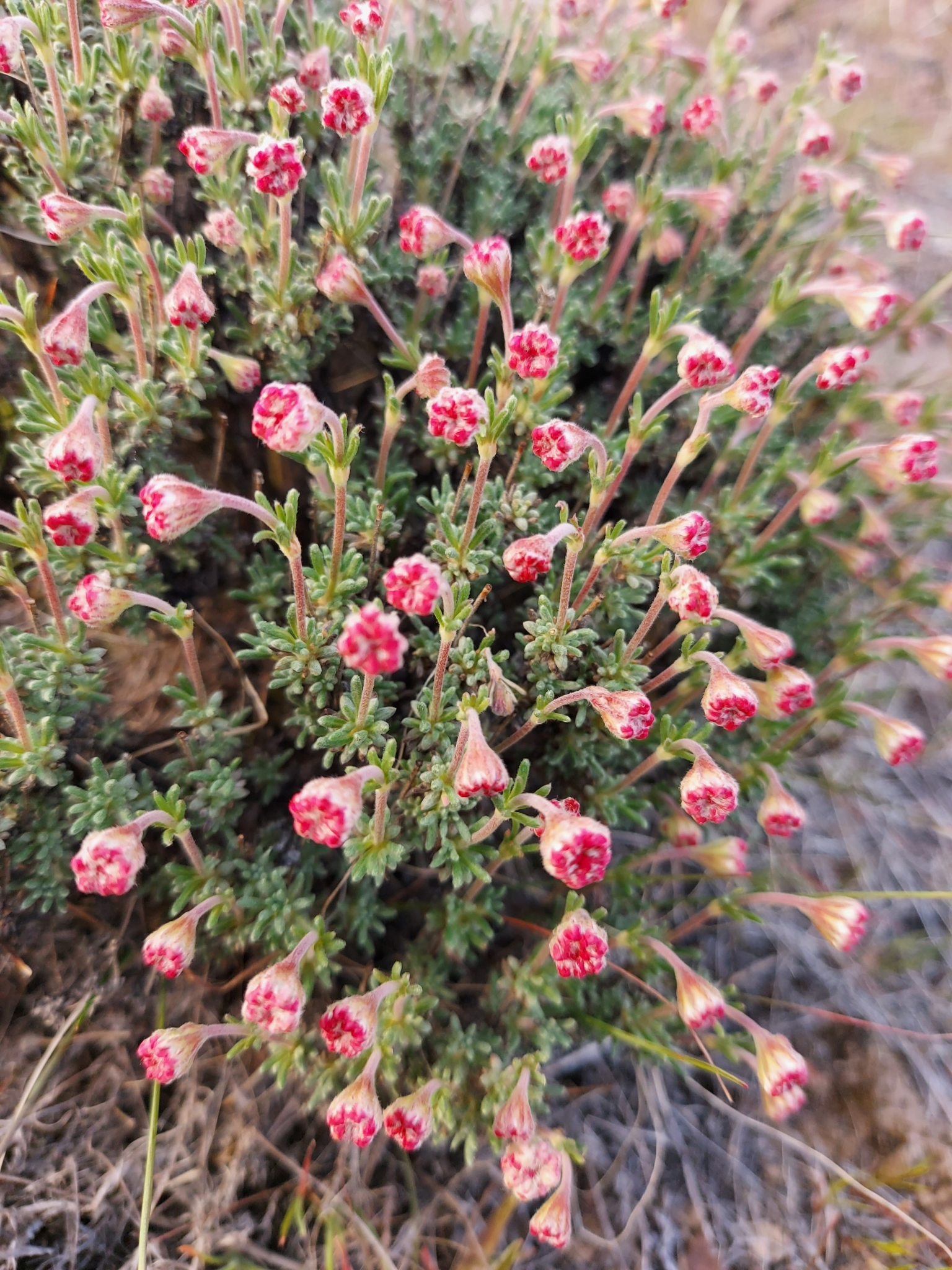
In bud

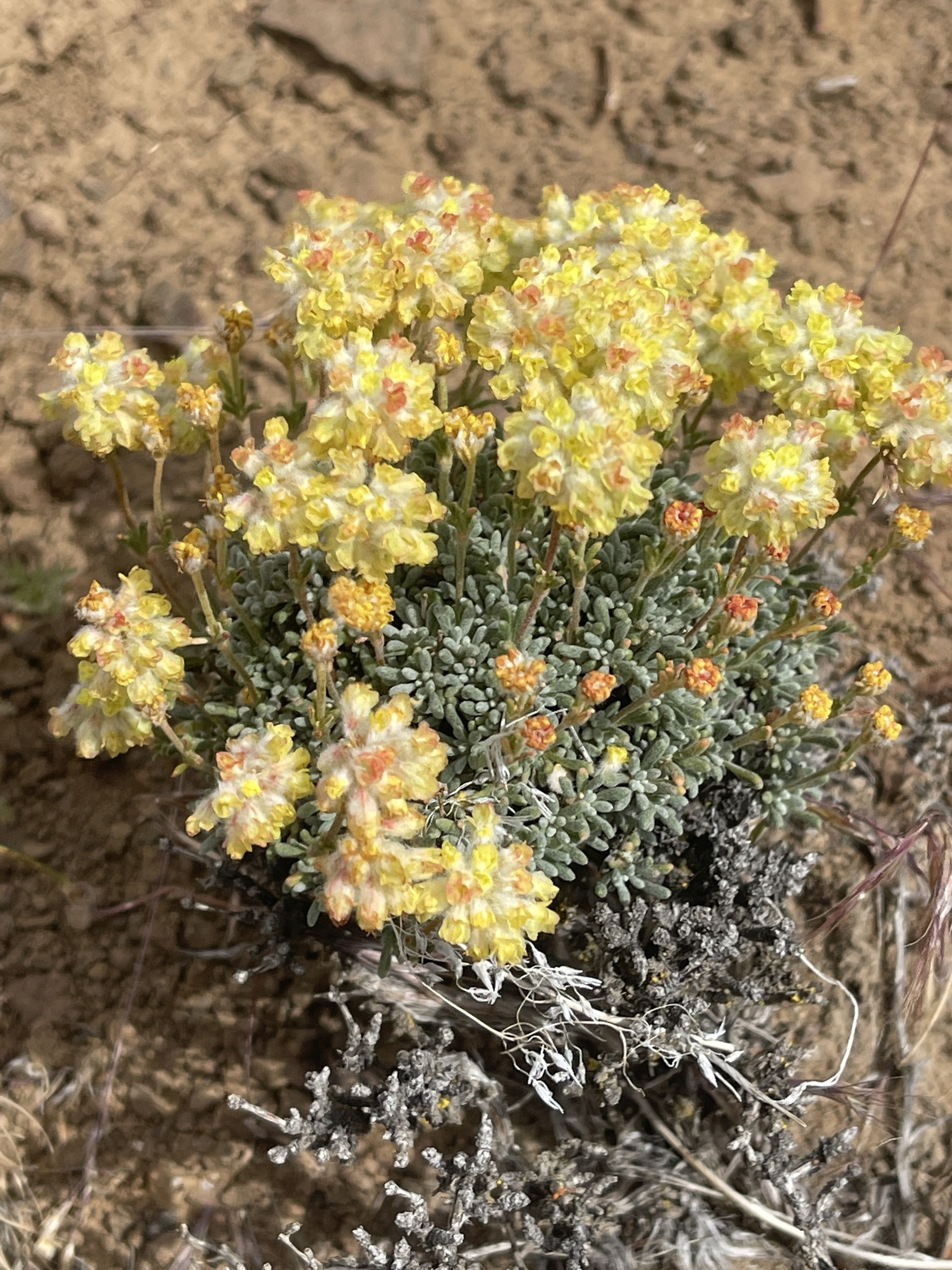
Yellow flower form
