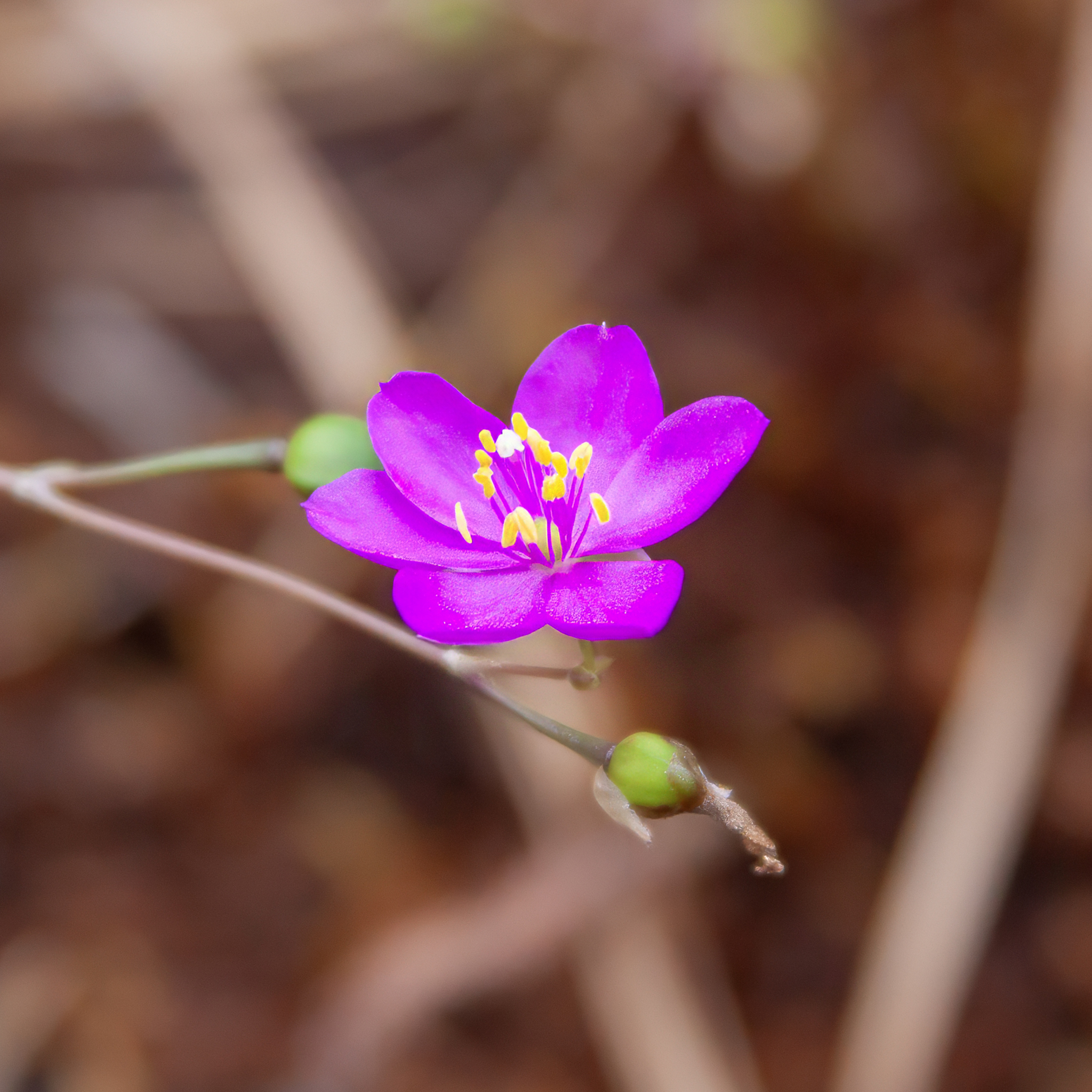

Scientific classification
- Kingdom: Plantae
- Clade: Embryophytes
- Clade: Tracheophytes
- Clade: Angiosperms
- Clade: Eudicots
- Order: Caryophyllales
- Family: Montiaceae
- Genus: Phemeranthus
- Species: P. teretifolius

Binomial name
- Phemeranthus teretifolius (Pursh) Raf.

= Phemeranthus teretifolius =

Species of flowering plant

Phemeranthus teretifolius is a species of North American flora. Commonly known as the Quill Fameflower, this plant grows in rocky and sandy soil. The Quill Fameflower is classified as a dicot and a perennial, thus it has several reproductive seasons. Native to the southeastern United States, this plant is classified as an herb or succulent.

There is disagreement among botanists and researchers about which family this species belongs in. According to the US Department of Agriculture, this species is of the order Caryophyllidae and family Portulacaceae. However, according to other organizations and databases, including the Smithsonian National Museum of Natural History and the Maryland Biodiversity database, Phemeranthus teretifolius belongs to the family Montiaceae. The source of contention regarding the family of this species is unknown.

The Quill Fameflower is a purple and pink colored flower, and can self-fertilize. Growing in rocky and sandy soil, this species is found primarily in the southwestern United States.

== Phemeranthus - genus ==
The Phemeranthus genus is a monophyletic group, comprising 25 species, which are categorized as succulent, herbaceous perennials found among rocky ecosystems and sand barrens. Many species within this genus are better suited for rocky and arid environments due to the fleshy and succulent nature of the plants. This genus is concentrated in northern Mexico and the southwestern United States. Phemeranthus, commonly known as fameflower, is an excellent example of a genus that vary significantly in geographic range, range size, and habitat. Phemeranthus also means ephemeral flower, which is a nod to its short life span. 16 species within this genus are found in North America, and a majority are found in the southwest.

== Phemeranthus teretifolius - species ==
Phemeranthus teretifolius is a dicot and a perennial plant. The Quill Fameflower grows 5 to 50 centimeters (2.0 to 19.7 in) tall, with a weak stem and alternate leaves. The leaves are generally 3 to 6 centimeters (1.2 to 2.4 in) long, and are tightly packed along the stem. The flowers of this species are purple and pink, and possess 5 petals each, with, on average, 12 to 20 yellow stamens. This species habitat is largely rocky outcrops.

== Description ==
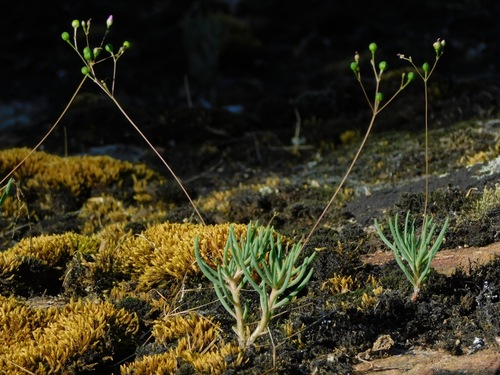
A few individuals of the Phemeranthus teretifolius species, on a mossy surface growing up out of the ground

The Quill Fameflower grows between 2 and 20 inches tall, with a weak and fleshy stem. The leaves grow tightly packed along the stem, in an alternate fashion, meaning that there are spaces along the stem between each leaf. The leaves are relatively round, and grow 1.2 to 2.4 inches long. Along the peduncle, the flower will grow and bloom, typically with 5 petals. The flowers are a bright pinkish purple color, often considered fuchsia or magenta. From each peduncle, only one or two flowers will bloom a day.

== Distribution ==
The Quill Fameflower is endemic to the United States, and can be found across the country. Specifically, this plant grows in Alabama, Delaware, Georgia, Kentucky, Maryland, North Carolina, South Carolina, Pennsylvania, Tennessee, Virginia, and West Virginia.

== Ecology ==
The Quill Fameflower produces fleshy and succulent leaves, which are specifically designed for water storage. The plant maintains deciduous green foliage, and prefers full sun conditions. This fameflower has nearly no root system, and is very drought tolerant, thus making it better suited for rocky, sandy soil. This plant is not self-incompatible, and can self-fertilize as it has cosexual flowers, with both staminate and pistillate structures. The flowers open only for one day, around 3pm EST and close before nightfall, and one single individual may produce more than one hundred flowers. The species begins flowering in April and continues through October, and is pollinated primarily by bees. Fascinatingly, this flower blooms for only a few hours a day, and if it is not fertilized by a bee within this window, it will close at night and self-fertilize. With a short life-span, this plant grows primarily in the open, in thin, very rocky or sandy soil, typically sandstone or granite.

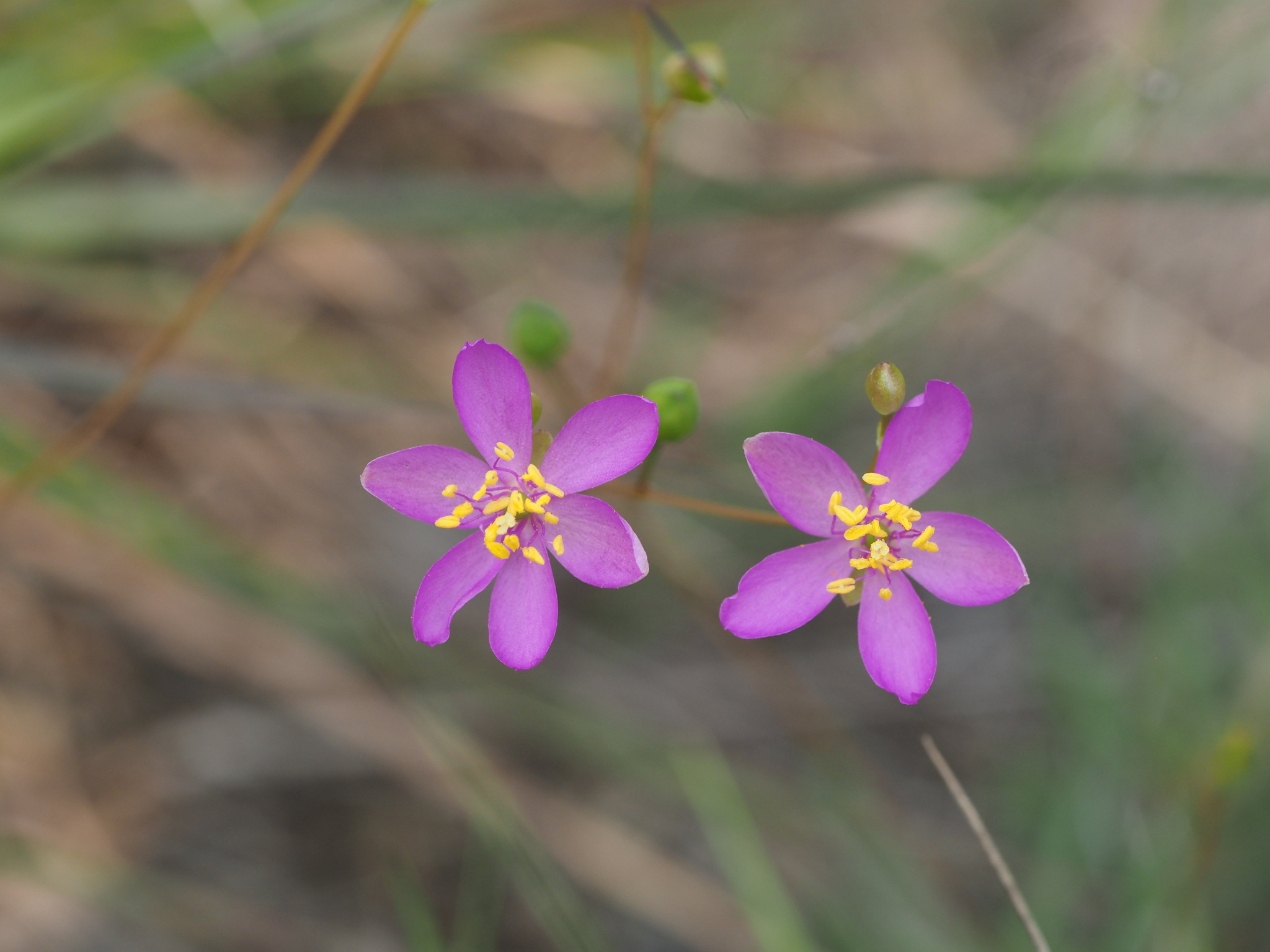
Two small pink flowers of the species Phemeranthus teretifolius

== History ==
Frederick T. Pursh is credited with the discovery and naming of Phemeranthus teretifolius. Pursh was a botanist who was hired in 1807, by Meriwether Lewis, to examine, document, and catalogue the vast array of plant species that were brought back after the Expedition out west. In 1813, Pursh published his own book, entitled Flora Americae Septentrionalis, detailing many species of flora in North America. In past literature and botany records, this species was referred to as Talinum teretifolium.

== Conservation ==
The NatureServe Explorer database is a guide that tracks the conservation status of 100,000 rare and endangered species and ecosystems in the Americas. Within the guide, a status of G5 indicates a secure species, which is a species that is at a very low risk of extinction due to its having a wide habitat range, and no concerns due to recent declines or threats. A status of G3 indicates a vulnerable species, which is a species that is at a moderate risk of extinction due to a restricted habitat range, and some concern over recent declines and threats to the species. According to this database, the Quill Fameflower species' global conservation status is G5, or, secure. However, the conservation status of this species in specific states differs. In North and South Carolina, the Quill Fameflower maintains a status of G3, or vulnerable. In Alabama, Kentucky, and West Virginia, the Quill Fameflower receives a status of G1, or critically imperiled. This means that this species is at high risk of extinction, with a very restricted habitat, and has experienced severe declines and threats. The species is widespread across North America, but with a restricted habitat, thus, it is not overly abundant in any one specific geographic region. Further, its habitat is frequently disturbed by human practices, specifically by land use conversion and habitat fragmentation. Although this species maintains a wide geographic range, with a lack of abundance in any one area, the Quill Fameflower is also threatened by quarrying and recreational vehicles.
