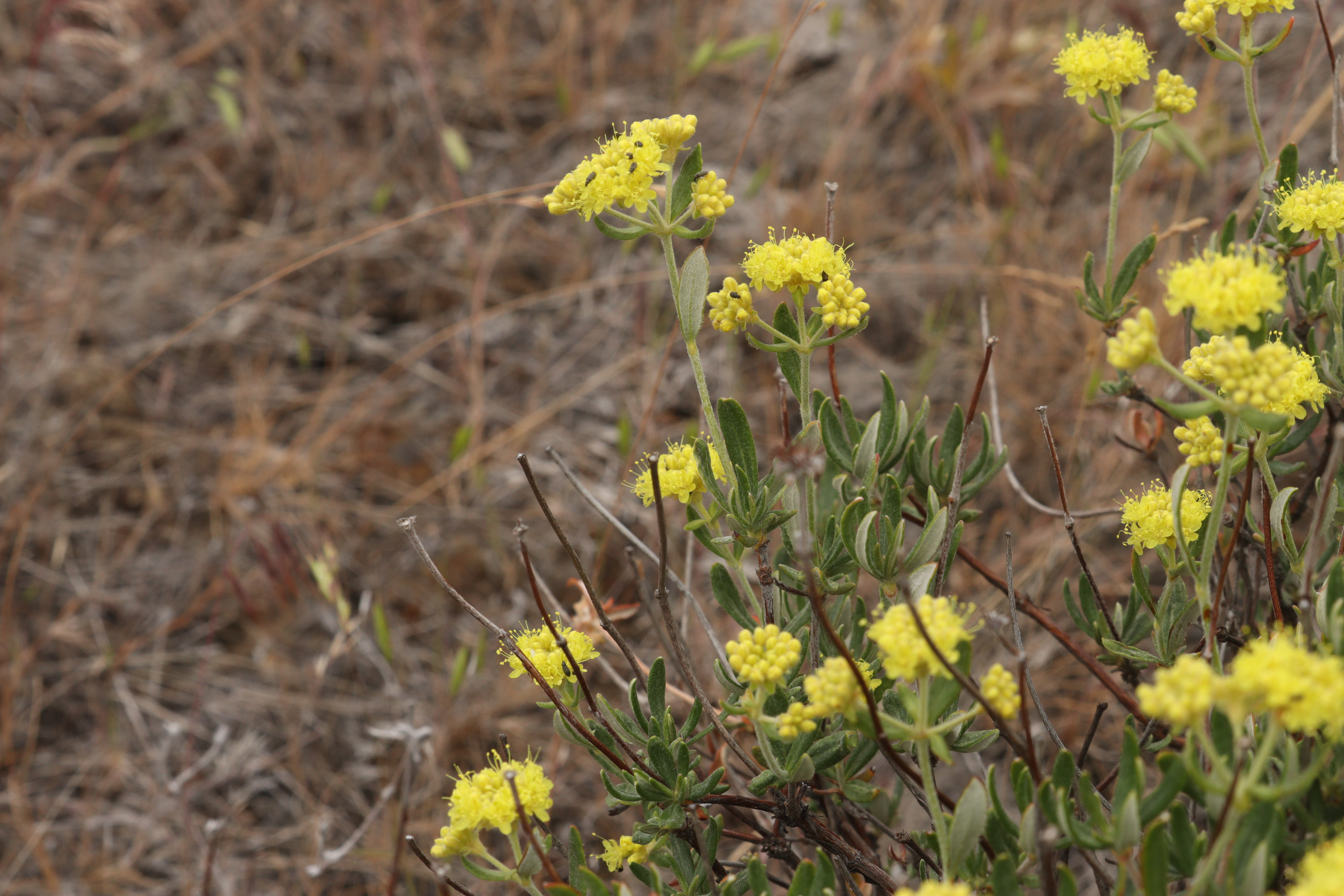

Scientific classification
- Kingdom: Plantae
- Clade: Tracheophytes
- Clade: Angiosperms
- Clade: Eudicots
- Order: Caryophyllales
- Family: Polygonaceae
- Genus: Eriogonum
- Species: E. sphaerocephalum

Binomial name
- Eriogonum sphaerocephalum Dougl. ex Benth.

= Eriogonum sphaerocephalum =

Species of wild buckwheat

Eriogonum sphaerocephalum is a species of wild buckwheat known by the common names rock buckwheat and round-headed desert buckwheat. It is native to the western United States.

== Habitat ==
Eriogonum sphaerocephalum can be found primarily east of the crest of the Cascade Range, in Washington and Oregon to Idaho and from southern Oregon and northern California to northern Nevada. It is a common member of desert, rocky and sagebrush steppe habitats. It is found over a wide range of elevations, but is most common between 2,000–7,000 feet (600–2,100 m).

== Description ==
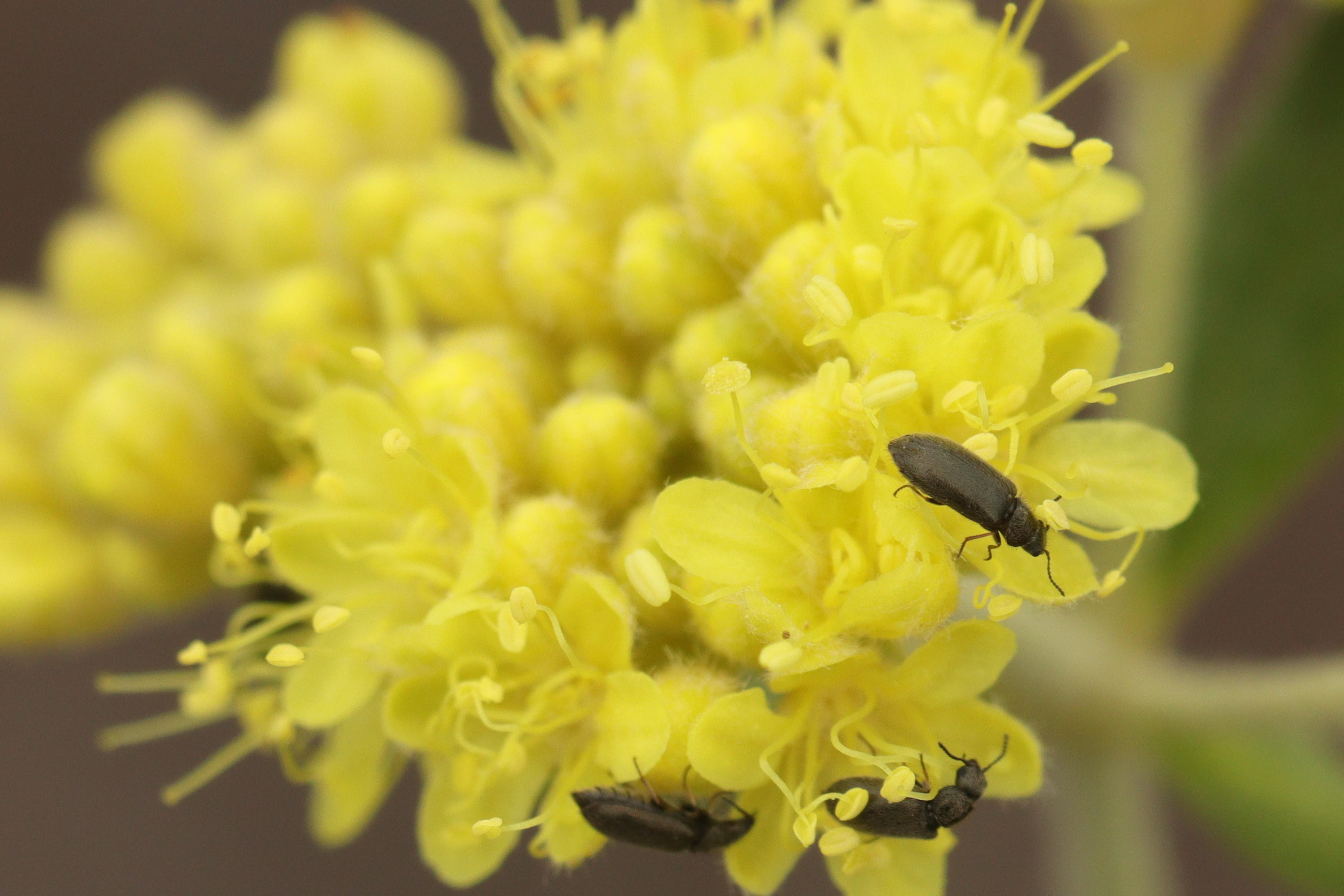
Tepals are generally yellow, but sometimes white or pink, about 6–8 mm (1/4–3/8 in) long.

The plant is a small shrub or subshrub up to 50 cm (20 in) tall and wide, growing from a caudex and producing erect flowering stems. Fresh blooms occur in early summer. The leaves are wooly (typically on the underside), widely lance-shaped to somewhat oval, and 1–4 cm (3/8–1 5/8 in) long, forming basal rosettes around the caudex and appearing at the end of branches.

The inflorescence arises on a stalk and bears many yellow flowers in a head-like cluster or umbel.

== Varieties ==
There are several varieties of this species:

- E. s. var. fasciculifolium is endemic to Idaho.
- E. s. var. halimioides is a widespread variety with very pale yellow flowers.
- E. s. var. sphaerocephalum has bright yellow flowers.
