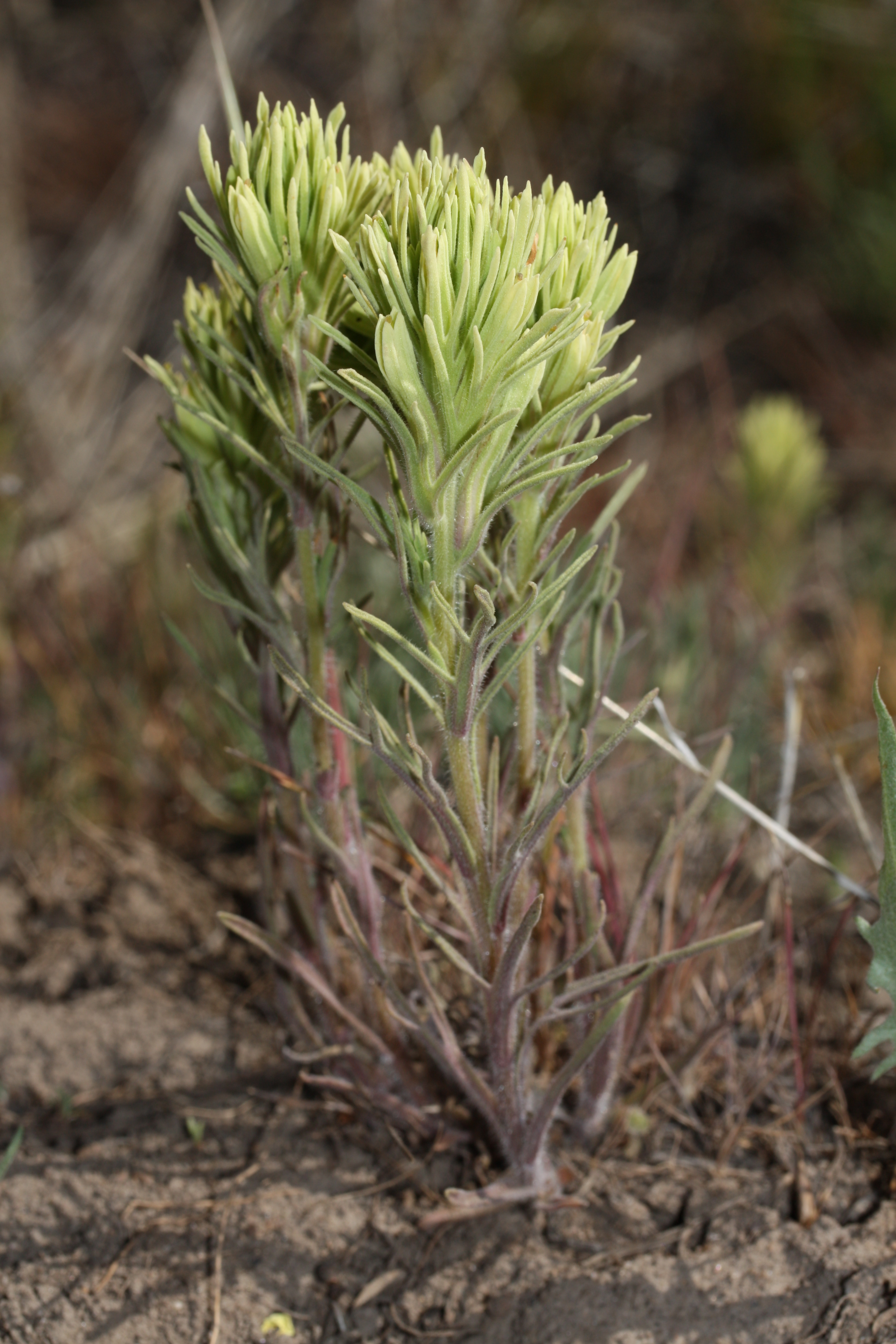

Scientific classification
- Kingdom: Plantae
- Clade: Tracheophytes
- Clade: Angiosperms
- Clade: Eudicots
- Clade: Asterids
- Order: Lamiales
- Family: Orobanchaceae
- Genus: Castilleja
- Species: C. thompsonii

Binomial name
- Castilleja thompsonii Pennell

= Castilleja thompsonii =

Species of plant

Castilleja thompsonii is a species of hemiparasitic perennial herb in the Orobanchaceae family with the common name Thompson's Indian paintbrush. It is native to south central British Columbia and Washington State.

== Description ==
Castilleja thompsonii forms clusters of erect stems from 10 to 40 cm tall with simple linear lower leaves and upper leaves divided into 3-5 narrow linear lobes. The leaves, stems, and floral bracts are lightly covered with hairs. The flowers form at the top of each stem and their outward appearance is mostly due to bracts that have a maroon to pale reddish base and cream to pale yellow-green upper parts.

== Distribution and habitat ==
Castilleja thompsonii grows in seasonally dry open areas in south central British Columbia and eastern Washington State. It is usually found in thin rocky soils associated with sagebrushes and higher in mountains on open rocky ridges.
