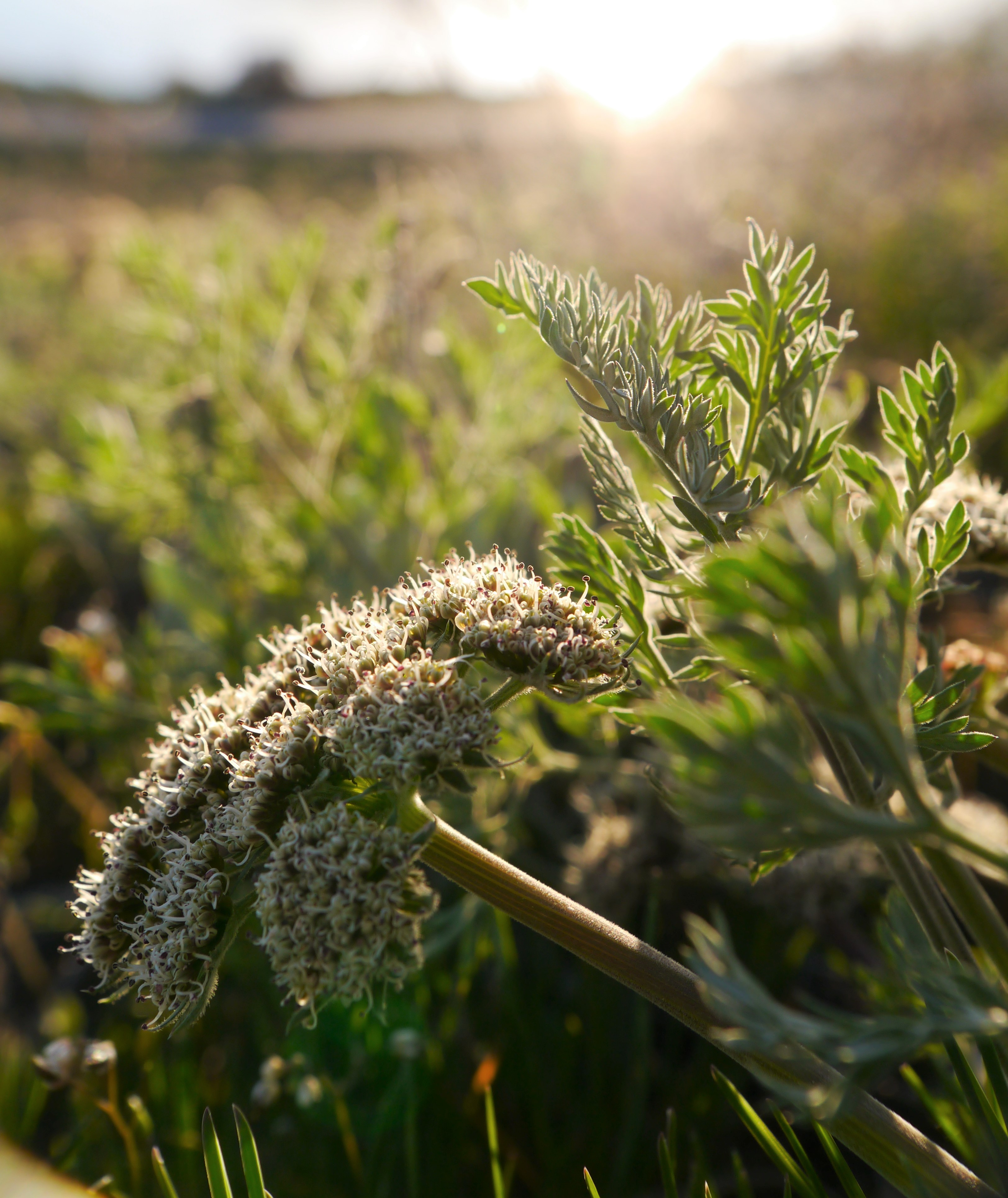
- Lomatium macrocarpum near the Columbia River in East Wenatchee, Douglas County Washington

Conservation status
- Secure (NatureServe)

Scientific classification
- Kingdom: Plantae
- Clade: Tracheophytes
- Clade: Angiosperms
- Clade: Eudicots
- Clade: Asterids
- Order: Apiales
- Family: Apiaceae
- Genus: Lomatium
- Species: L. macrocarpum

Binomial name
- Lomatium macrocarpum (Nutt. ex Torr. & A.Gray) J.M.Coult. & Rose

= Lomatium macrocarpum =

Species of flowering plant

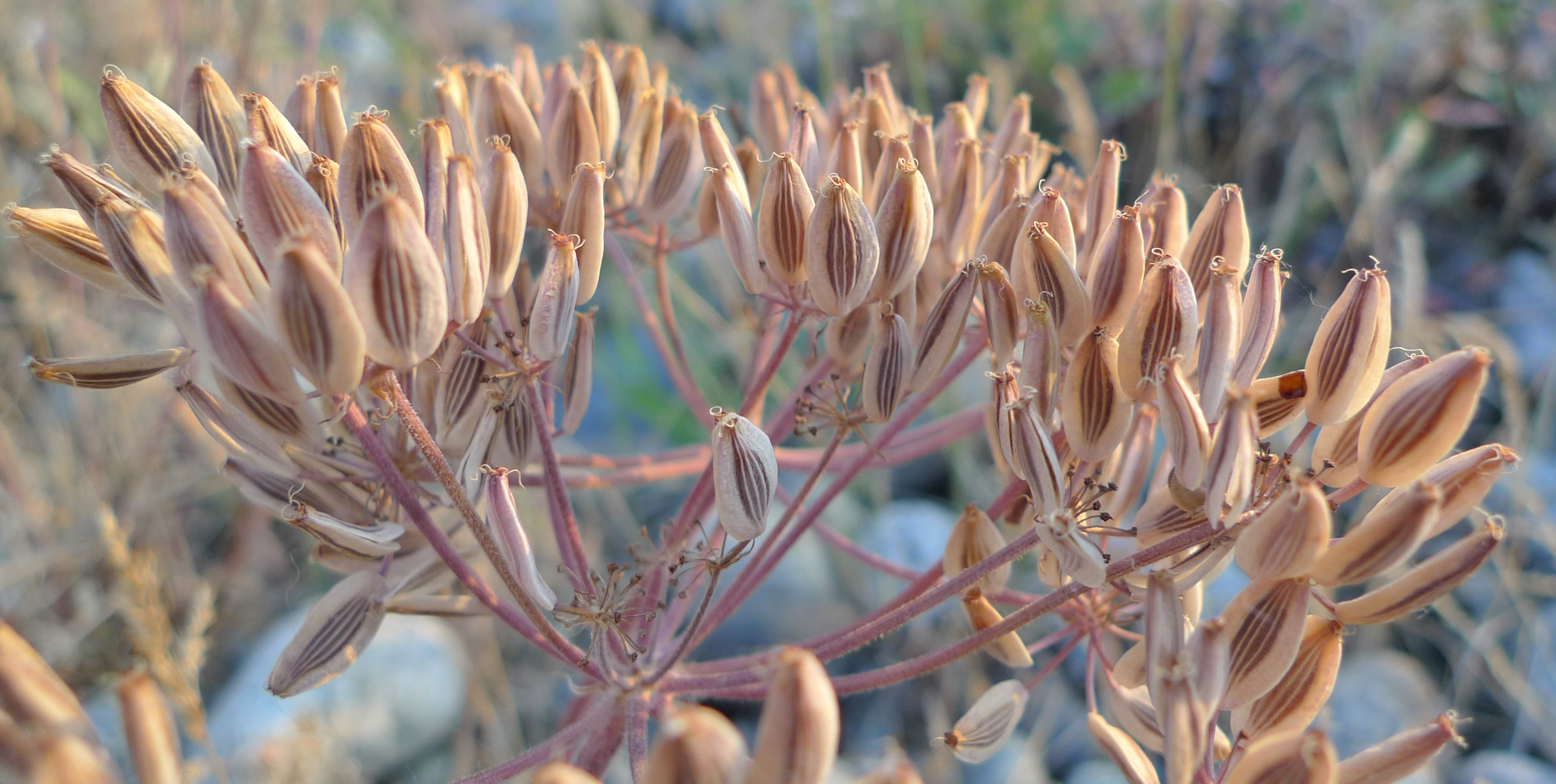
Ripe fruits

Lomatium macrocarpum is a perennial flowering plant in the carrot family known by the common names bigseed lomatium, biscuit root or bigseed biscuitroot. It is native to much of western North America, where it can be found in various types of habitat, including the grasslands of the Great Plains, and particularly in rocky areas. It is a spreading or erect perennial herb growing up to about half a meter long with hairy, gray-green herbage. The grayish basal leaves are up to about 24 centimetres (9.4 in) long and are intricately divided into many small, narrow segments. The inflorescence bears an umbel of yellowish, greenish, purplish, or white flowers, growing from a lateral stem. The fruit is a compressed, winged, round or oval disc up to about 2 cm long.

The roots are tuberous and have been made into a flour.
