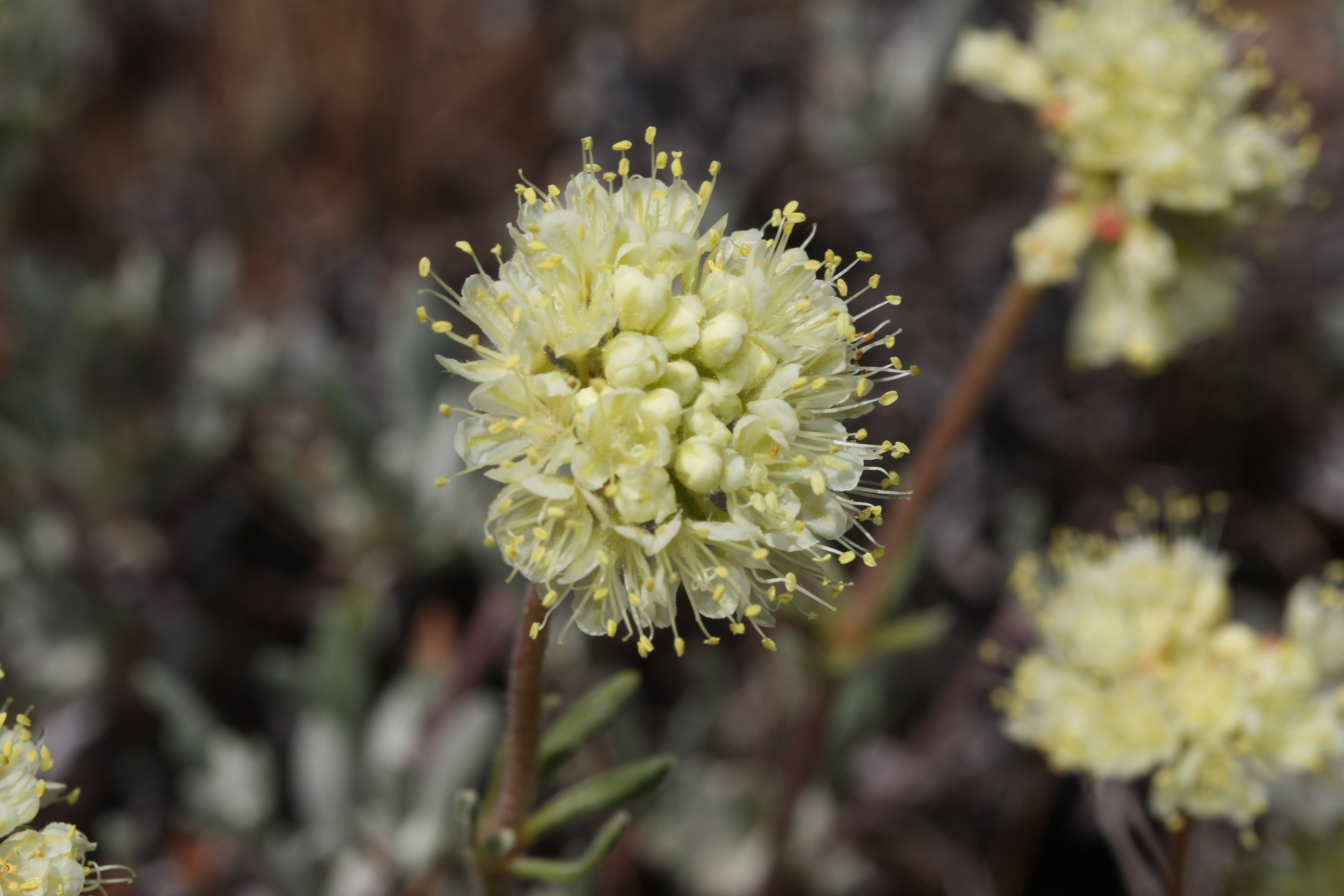

Conservation status
- Secure (NatureServe)

Scientific classification
- Kingdom: Plantae
- Clade: Tracheophytes
- Clade: Angiosperms
- Clade: Eudicots
- Order: Caryophyllales
- Family: Polygonaceae
- Genus: Eriogonum
- Species: E. douglasii

Binomial name
- Eriogonum douglasii Benth.

= Eriogonum douglasii =

Species of wild buckwheat

Eriogonum douglasii is a species of wild buckwheat known by the common name Douglas' buckwheat. It is native to the western United States, including the Pacific Northwest and part of the Great Basin.

== Description ==
Eriogonum douglasii forms a mat of hairy herbage around a caudex. There are rosettes of lance-shaped to oval leaves with blades 0.4 to nearly 2 centimeters long. The leaves are feltlike, covered in woolly hairs. The inflorescence arises on a solid, erect flowering stem up to 15 centimeters tall with a whorl of bracts midway up. It is a headlike cluster of cream, yellow, or rose-pink flowers with protruding stamens. The flower buds are often much redder in outward appearance, even when they open to a yellow or yellow-pink flower.

The very similar E. thymoides usually has more rolled back leaves that appear nearly cylindrical and with a tightly clasping involucre.

== Range and Habitat ==
Eriogonum douglasii is native to Washington, Oregon, Idaho, and northern California in dry areas at moderate elevations. It grows in grassland, sagebrush, and open forest habitat, often on thin rocky soils.

== Varieties ==
There are three varieties of this species, including vars. douglasii and meridionale. The rare var. elkoense (Sunflower Flat wild buckwheat) is endemic to Elko County, Nevada.
