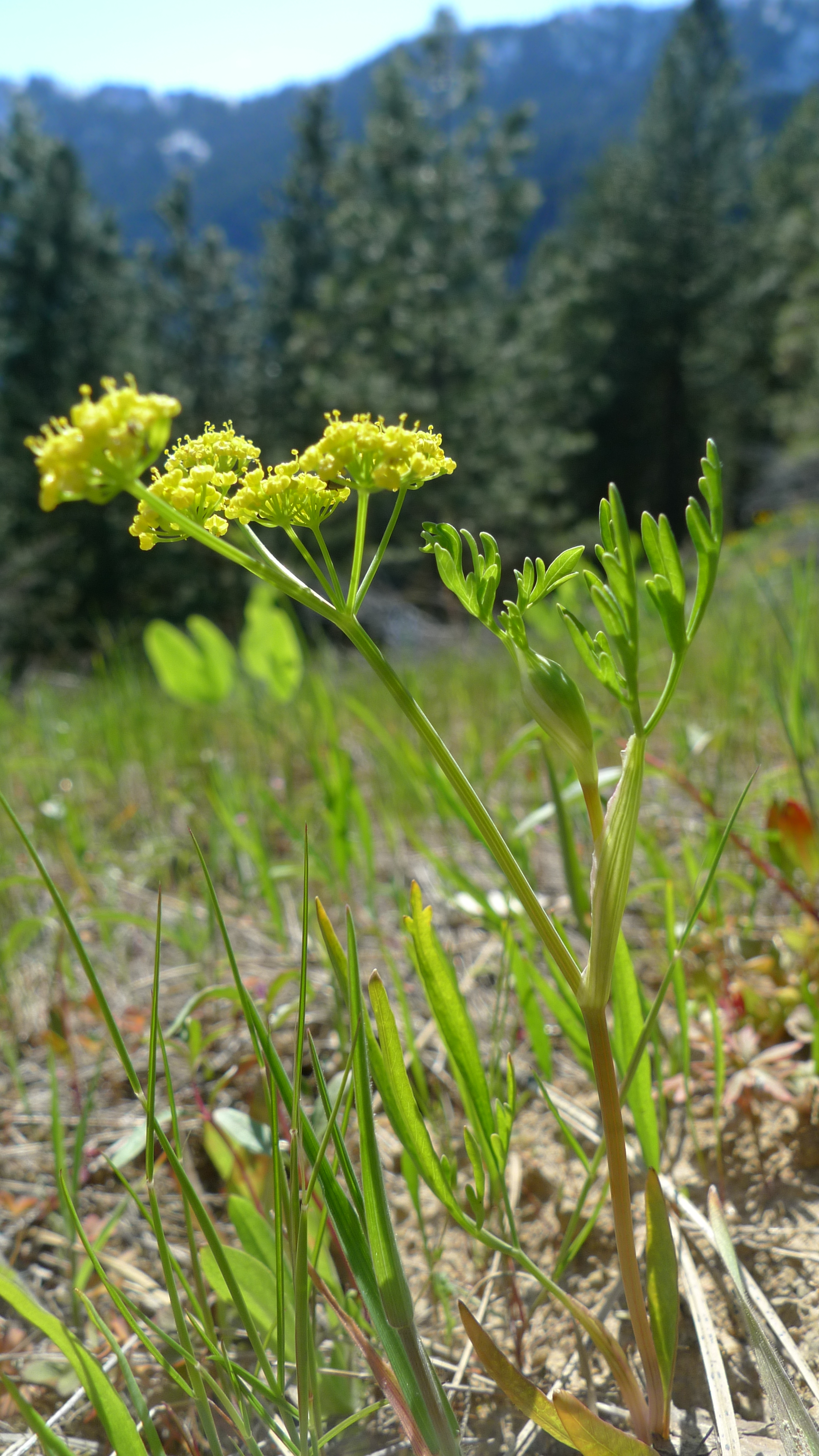
- Lomatium ambiguum at Leavenworth Ski Hill, Chelan County Washington

Scientific classification
- Kingdom: Plantae
- Clade: Tracheophytes
- Clade: Angiosperms
- Clade: Eudicots
- Clade: Asterids
- Order: Apiales
- Family: Apiaceae
- Genus: Lomatium
- Species: L. ambiguum

Binomial name
- Lomatium ambiguum (Nutt.) J.M.Coult. & Rose

= Lomatium ambiguum =

Species of flowering plant

Lomatium ambiguum, also known as Wyeth biscuitroot, is a perennial herb of the family Apiaceae that grows in the northwestern United States and into British Columbia in dry areas. The leaves are divided into many blades, and stems can be slightly purple and are 6–24 cm tall. Yellow flowers in compound umbels appear from late April to June.

== Cultivation and uses ==
Like many Lomatium species, this was also utilized by Native Americans. The flowers and leaves were dried and used to flavor meats, stews and salads while a tea brewed of the same parts was taken for common colds and sore throats.
