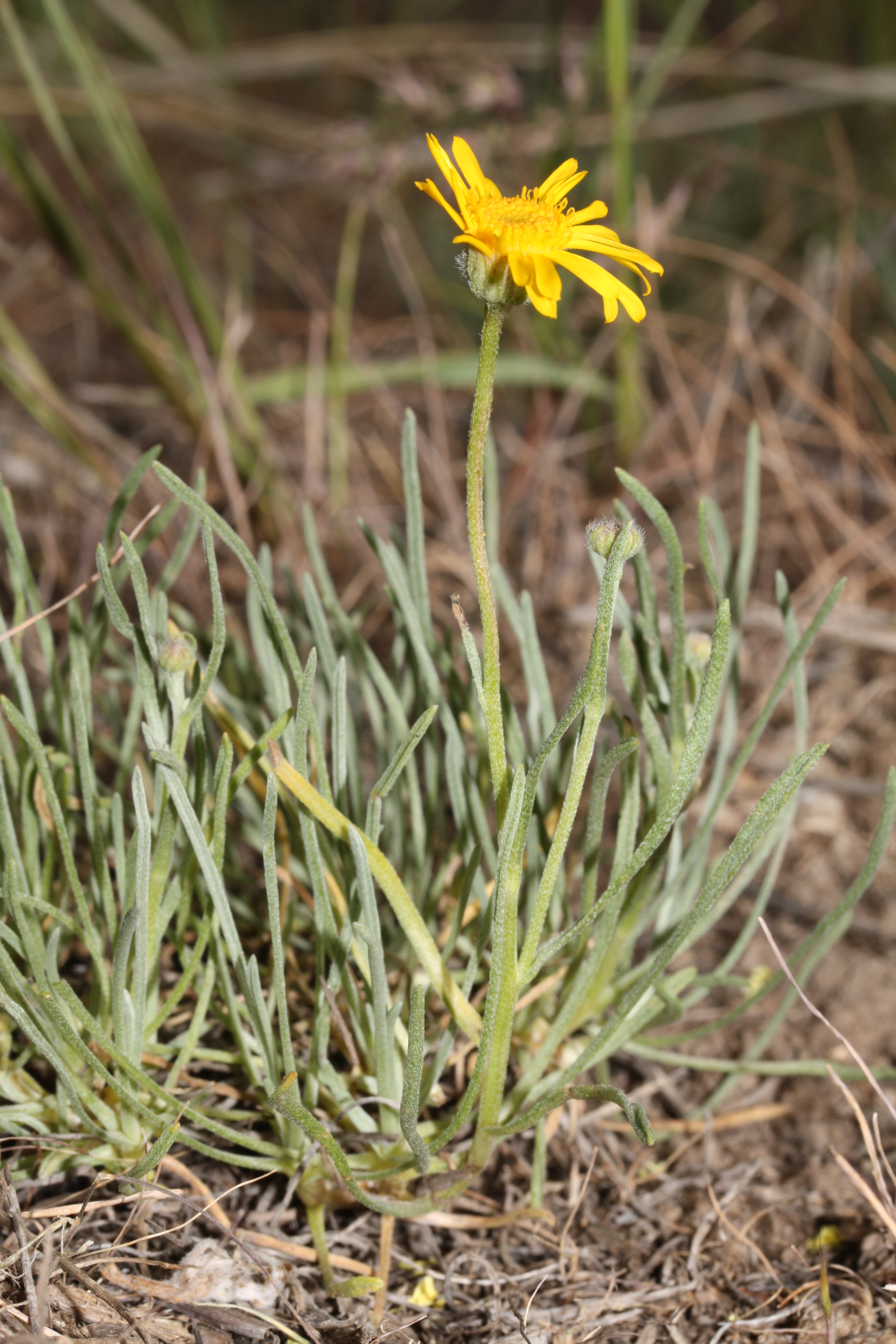
- Erigeron linearis in Wenas Wildlife Area in Washington

Scientific classification
- Kingdom: Plantae
- Clade: Tracheophytes
- Clade: Angiosperms
- Clade: Eudicots
- Clade: Asterids
- Order: Asterales
- Family: Asteraceae
- Genus: Erigeron
- Species: E. linearis

Binomial name
- Erigeron linearis (Hook.) Piper

Synonyms
- Diplopappus linearis Hook.; Erigeron luteus A.Nelson; Erigeron peucephyllus A.Gray; Erigeron yakimensis A.Nelson

= Erigeron linearis =

Species of flowering plant

Erigeron linearis is a species of flowering plant in the family Asteraceae known by the common name desert yellow fleabane or narrow leaved fleabane. It is native to western North America.

== Description ==
Erigeron linearis is a small clumping perennial herb reaching a maximum height of 20 centimeters (8 inches), with a woody taproot. Its leaves are long and narrow, mostly clustered around the base of the stem, and are 2 to 9 cm (3/4 to 3 1/2 in) long, pale green to green, and lightly covered with short white hairs. The erect lightly hairy flower stems are leafless or have a few reduced linear leaves and usually produce only one flower head (though occasionally 2 or 3) each about 1 cm (3/8 in) wide. The flower has a center of many golden yellow disc florets and a fringe of as many as 38 pale to bright yellow or cream-colored ray florets. The fruit is an achene attached to a fluffy pappus with 10 to 20 bristles. Seeds are presumably wind dispersed.

== Distribution and habitat ==
Erigeron linearis is native to the mountains of western North America from British Columbia as far south as Wyoming, northern Nevada and Mono County in California. The species grows in open rocky slopes associated with the shrubs sagebrush, bitterbrush or juniper.

== Uses ==
Some Plateau Indian tribes used desert yellow fleabane as a poultice for treating sores.

== Gallery ==
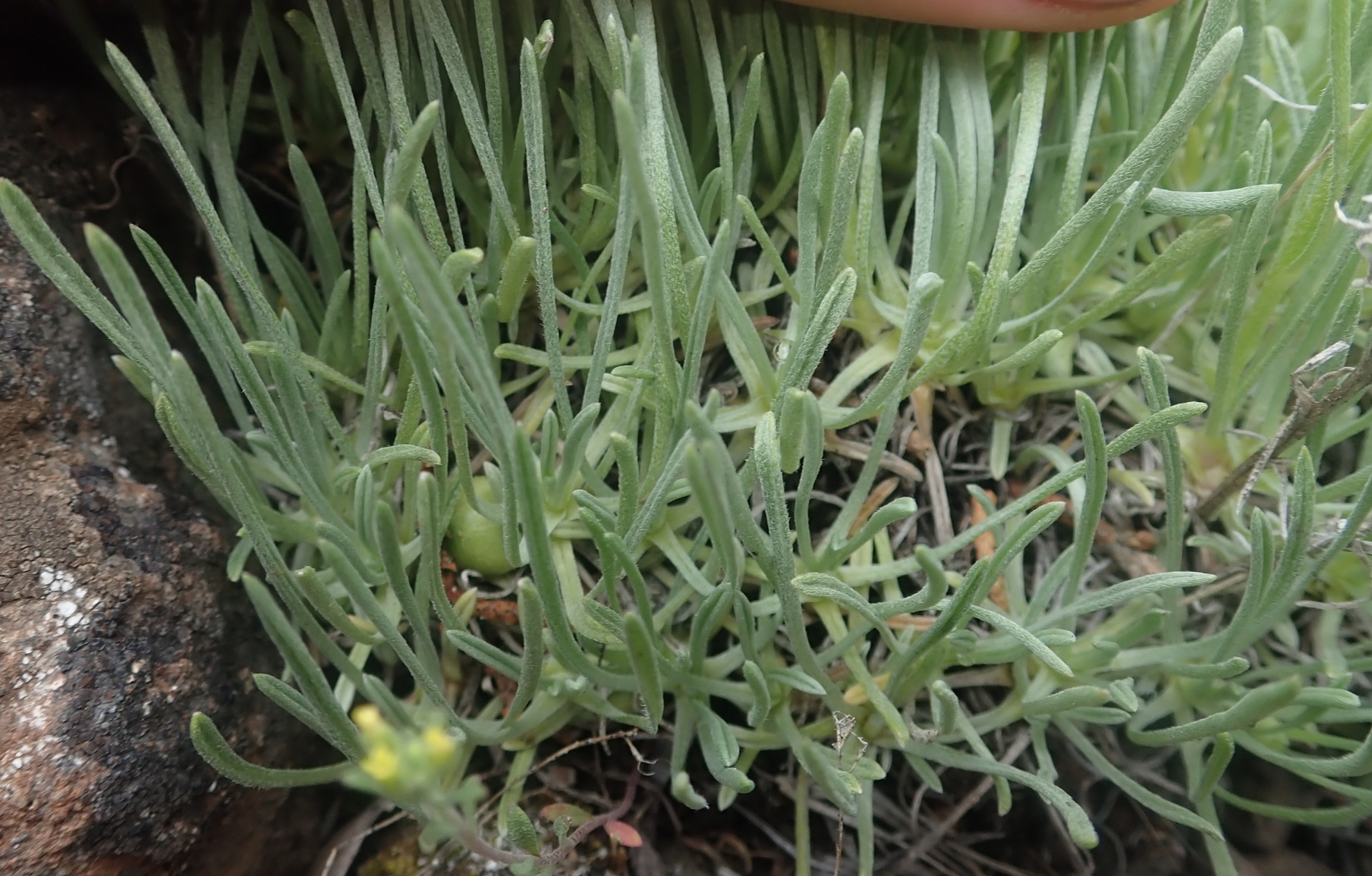
Closeup of foliage

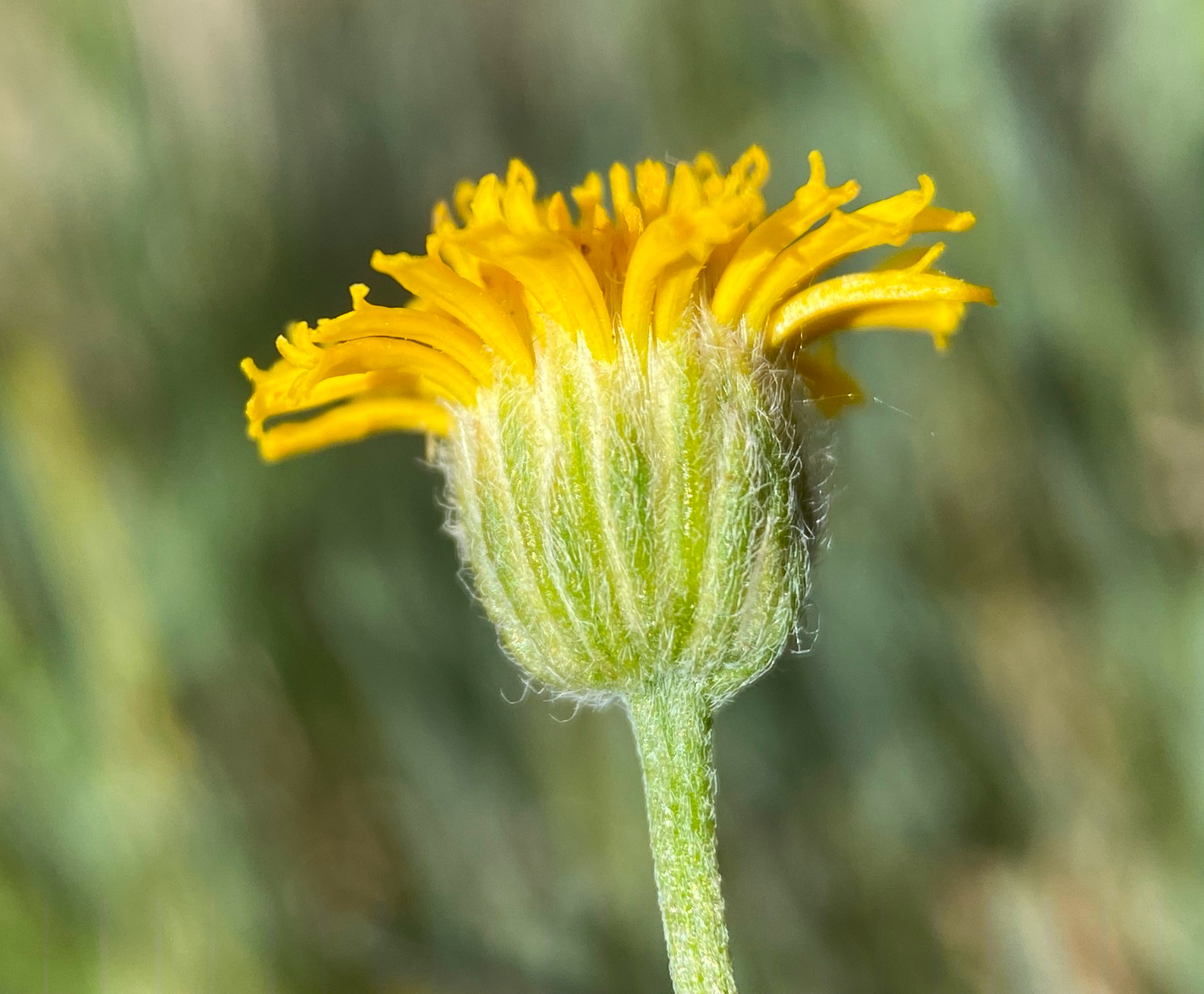
Flower bract

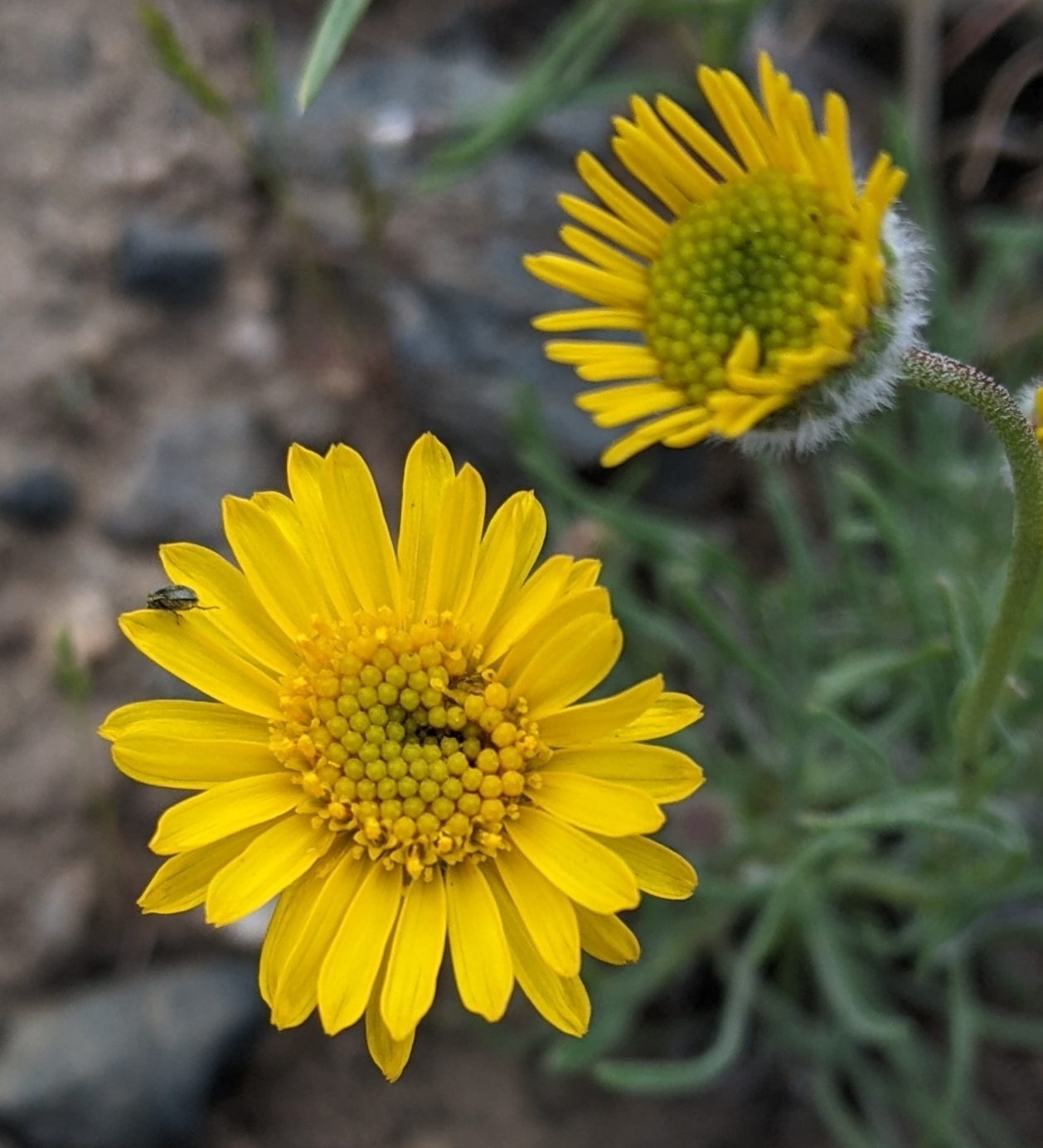
Flowers
