= Perdicium =

Scientific classification
- Kingdom: Plantae
- Clade: Tracheophytes
- Clade: Angiosperms
- Clade: Eudicots
- Clade: Asterids
- Order: Asterales
- Family: Asteraceae
- Subfamily: Mutisioideae
- Tribe: Mutisieae
- Genus: Perdicium; L.

Type species
- Perdicium capense L.

Synonyms
- Pardisium Burm.f. (1768)

Genus of flowering plants

Perdicium is a genus of plants in the tribe Mutisieae within the family Asteraceae. It includes two species native to the Cape Provinces of South Africa.

Species

Several dozen species have at one time been considered members of Perdicium. Almost all of them are now regarded as better suited to other genera (Acourtia Ainsliaea Chaptalia Gerbera Haplocarpha Holocheilus Leibnitzia Leucheria Perezia Trixis). Only two remain:

- Perdicium capense L. - South Africa
- Perdicium leiocarpum DC. - South Africa
