= Río Gallegos, Santa Cruz =

Río Gallegos
- City and Port
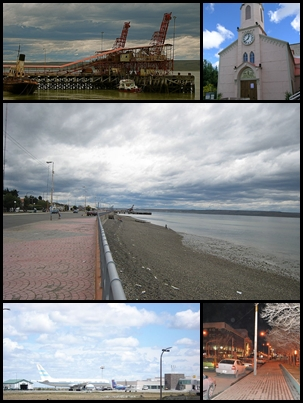
- The Harbour of Rio Gallegos, Our Lady of Luján Cathedral Parish, Gallegos river, Rio Gallegos airport and San Martín Avenue

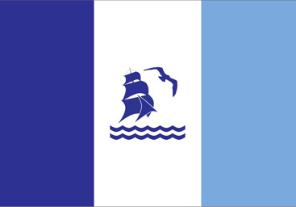
- Flag

- Location of Río Gallegos in Argentina Río Gallegos (Argentina)
- Coordinates: 51°37′24″S 69°12′58″W
- Country: Argentina
- Province: Santa Cruz
- Department: Güer Aike
- Founded: 19 December 1885
- Founder: Ramón Lista

Government
  - Intendant: Roberto Giubetich
- Elevation: 20 m (66 ft)

Population (2022 census)
  - Total: 115,524
- Time zone: UTC−3 (ART)
- CPA base: Z9400
- Dialing code: +54 2966
- Climate: BSk
- Website: Official website

Río Gallegos ([ˈri.o ɣaˈʝeɣos]) is the capital and largest settlement of the Patagonian province of Santa Cruz in Argentina. Located in the department of Güer Aike, it had a population of 115,524, according to the 2022 census [INDEC]. The city bears the name of the Gallegos River, and sits on its estuary 2,636 km (1,638 mi) south from the Argentine federal capital Buenos Aires.

Established on 19 December 1885 to increase Argentine power over southern Patagonia, Río Gallegos became the capital of the then Territory of Santa Cruz in 1888, retaining its status when the territory became a province in 1957. Néstor Kirchner, later President of Argentina, served as the city's mayor from 1987 to 1991 and is interred in a mausoleum in the city's cemetery.

== History ==
In 1525 Spanish explorer García Jofre de Loaísa became the first European to reach the Gallegos River, and named it Río San Idelfonso. Simón de Alcazaba y Sotomayor's 1535 expedition was the first to name the river "Río Gallegos". The area was not settled by Europeans until much later, with the settlement established 19 December 1885, when the Argentine government wished to better express its sovereignty over southern Patagonia – a naval base was created which increased the development of the town. Between 1912 and 1920, the government encouraged settlers from the Falkland Islands and southern Chile with preferential farming conditions. Some 3,000 arrived and boosted the town. As sheep-farming increased, Río Gallegos became the principal port for exporting sheep and their products. The Pioneers Museum is a preserved old Patagonian house exhibiting the life of the early settlers.

Governor Ramón Lista decided to move the Territorial Capital from Puerto Santa Cruz to Río Gallegos in 1888; official ratification of this decision came on 19 May 1904. The Cathedral of Our Lady of Luján was consecrated in 1900. The Territory of Santa Cruz was declared a Province in 1957, with Mario Cástulo Paradelo as its first Governor.

In the 1982 Falklands War, the city airport was base of Argentine Air Force Mirage III interceptors and A-4 Skyhawks strike aircraft.

Néstor Kirchner, President of Argentina from 2003 to 2007, was mayor of Río Gallegos between 1987 and 1991. His mausoleum is in the city and a street bears his name.

Today, Río Gallegos is an important city of the Argentine far south, with military bases and an international airport. Flights between Chile and Mount Pleasant Airport on the Falkland Islands stop at Río Gallegos once a month.

== Wildlife ==
Birds in the area include the thrush, rhea, chingolo (rufous-collared sparrow), Chilean flamingo, upland goose and black-necked swan. Grey foxes are predators on the sheep ranched in the city. Other animals found in the area include the guanaco.

On the outskirts of Rio Gallegos there is a wide variety of native plants, including calafates, anartrofilos, oxalis, violets and pansies, paper flowers, calceolarias, hipoqueris, leucerias, perezias, senecios, mata arrears, senecio miser, amancay, lilies, lily of the field.

== Sport ==
Rio Gallegos' main association football club is Boca Rio Gallegos of the Torneo Argentino B, the fourth tier of Argentine football. Founded 12 October 1945 by meat factory workers, the side share their crest and kit with Boca Juniors of Buenos Aires, one of Argentina's most successful clubs, and have played in the national league system since 1988. Rio Gallegos' oldest association football club are Boxing Club founded August 1920 and Hispano Americano founded 17 December 1925.

== Climate ==
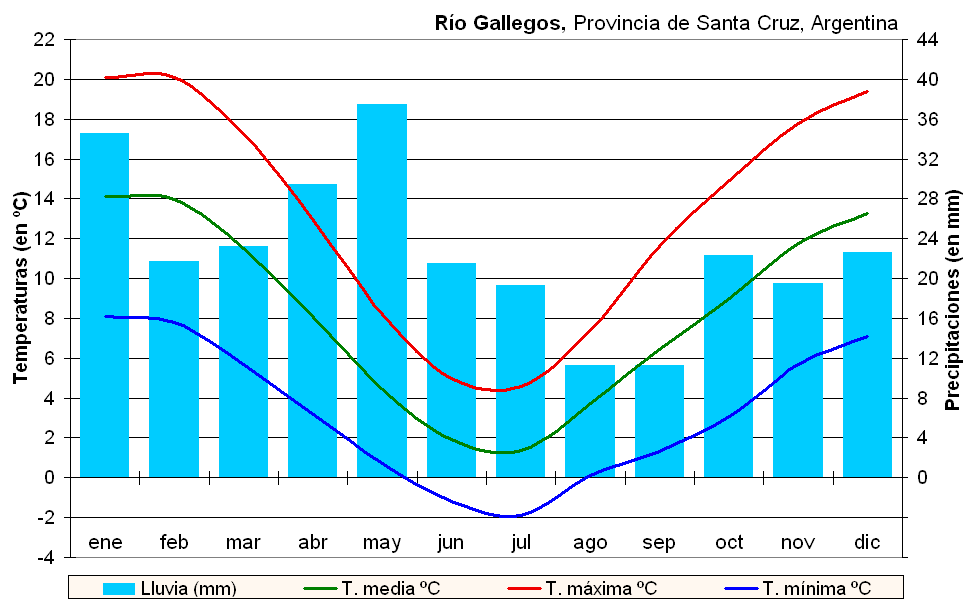
Average temperatures (min., avrg., max.) and precipitations.

Rio Gallegos has a cold steppe climate (BSk, under the Köppen climate classification). The climate is dry, windy and cold, with occasional snow during the winter. It is one of the windiest cities on earth, with winds above 50 km/h (31 mph) being commonplace, and over 100 km/h (62 mph) not exceptional. Winter temperatures average 5 °C (41 °F) during the day and −2 °C (28 °F) at night, but have dropped as low as −20 °C (−4 °F). Summers are extremely windy and cloudy, with days reaching a cool 19 °C (66 °F) and nights dropping to a relatively cold 7 °C (45 °F). Cold weather can occur at any time, and despite the very low precipitation, light drizzle and cloudy days are quite common. The highest temperature recorded was 35.8 °C (96 °F) on February 5, 2019 while the record low is −20.2 °C (−4 °F) on July 12, 1982.

Climate data for Río Gallegos, Santa Cruz, Argentina (1991–2020, extremes 1931–present)
Month	Jan	Feb	Mar	Apr	May	Jun	Jul	Aug	Sep	Oct	Nov	Dec	Year
Record high °C (°F)	35.0 (95.0)	35.8 (96.4)	33.8 (92.8)	28.2 (82.8)	22.6 (72.7)	17.0 (62.6)	16.1 (61.0)	18.1 (64.6)	24.9 (76.8)	27.2 (81.0)	30.4 (86.7)	31.0 (87.8)	35.8 (96.4)
Mean daily maximum °C (°F)	20.0 (68.0)	19.5 (67.1)	17.1 (62.8)	13.4 (56.1)	8.8 (47.8)	5.2 (41.4)	5.1 (41.2)	7.5 (45.5)	11.3 (52.3)	14.8 (58.6)	17.1 (62.8)	18.6 (65.5)	13.2 (55.8)
Daily mean °C (°F)	13.6 (56.5)	13.0 (55.4)	10.8 (51.4)	7.6 (45.7)	4.4 (39.9)	1.6 (34.9)	1.5 (34.7)	3.1 (37.6)	5.6 (42.1)	8.3 (46.9)	10.9 (51.6)	12.6 (54.7)	7.8 (46.0)
Mean daily minimum °C (°F)	7.4 (45.3)	6.9 (44.4)	5.4 (41.7)	2.7 (36.9)	0.2 (32.4)	−2.1 (28.2)	−2.3 (27.9)	−0.8 (30.6)	0.8 (33.4)	2.3 (36.1)	4.5 (40.1)	6.5 (43.7)	2.6 (36.7)
Record low °C (°F)	−0.9 (30.4)	−3.5 (25.7)	−7.8 (18.0)	−11.0 (12.2)	−16.2 (2.8)	−18.2 (−0.8)	−20.2 (−4.4)	−12.7 (9.1)	−9.0 (15.8)	−6.8 (19.8)	−6.4 (20.5)	−3.6 (25.5)	−20.2 (−4.4)
Average precipitation mm (inches)	26.9 (1.06)	29.5 (1.16)	28.6 (1.13)	24.6 (0.97)	24.3 (0.96)	20.9 (0.82)	19.8 (0.78)	18.7 (0.74)	14.6 (0.57)	14.5 (0.57)	22.0 (0.87)	32.2 (1.27)	276.6 (10.89)
Average precipitation days (≥ 0.1 mm)	9.7	7.9	9.9	8.4	7.9	7.6	8.2	7.3	6.3	5.6	7.8	10.4	97.0
Average snowy days	0.0	0.0	0.1	0.3	1.1	3.9	4.0	2.9	1.5	0.6	0.3	0.1	14.6
Average relative humidity (%)	51.9	56.3	62.4	68.6	75.1	79.0	77.7	73.4	66.1	56.9	52.6	52.5	64.4
Mean monthly sunshine hours	241.8	200.6	182.9	147.0	117.8	93.0	108.5	139.5	162.0	210.8	231.0	232.5	2,067.4
Mean daily sunshine hours	7.8	7.1	5.9	4.9	3.8	3.1	3.5	4.5	5.4	6.8	7.7	7.5	5.7
Percentage possible sunshine	27	31	34	33	37	35	33	34	36	35	28	23	32
Average ultraviolet index	9	8	4	2	1	1	1	1	3	6	8	9	4
Source 1: Servicio Meteorológico Nacional (May record low) (UV 2014-2019)
Source 2: Secretaria de Mineria (December record low only and percent sun, 1951–1980), Meteo Climat (record highs and lows),

== Gallery ==
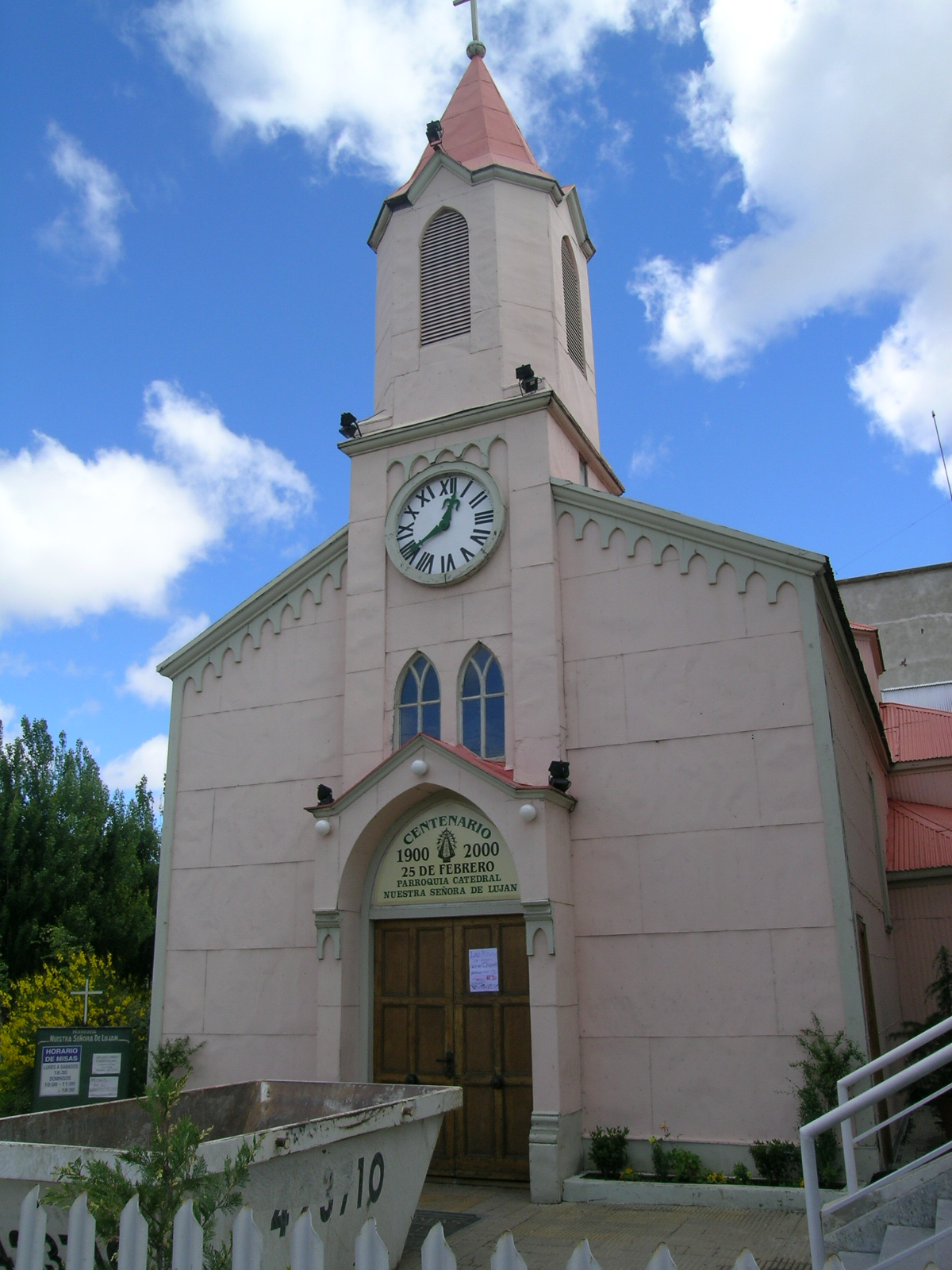
Cathedral of Our Lady of Luján.

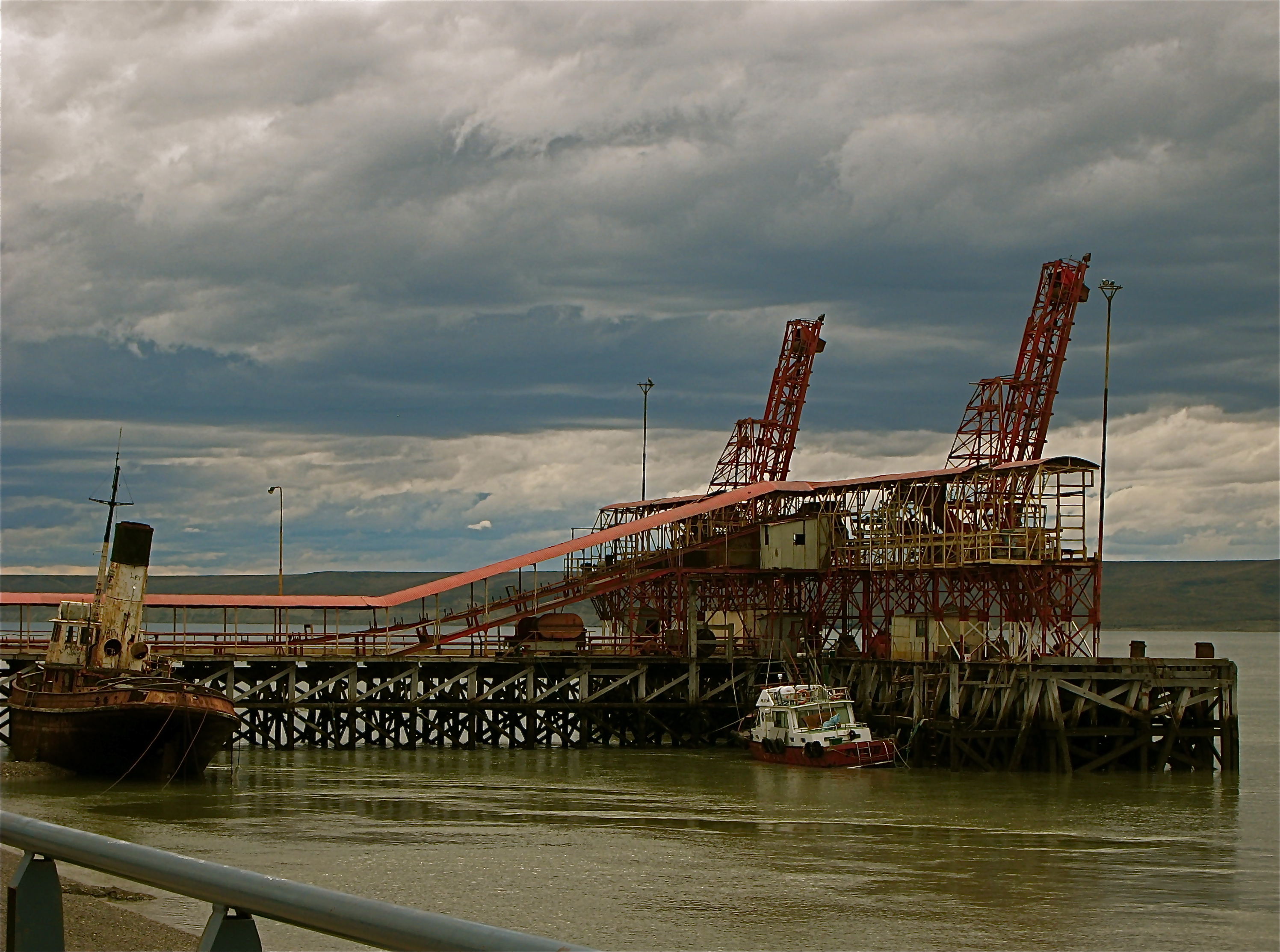
Rio Gallegos port

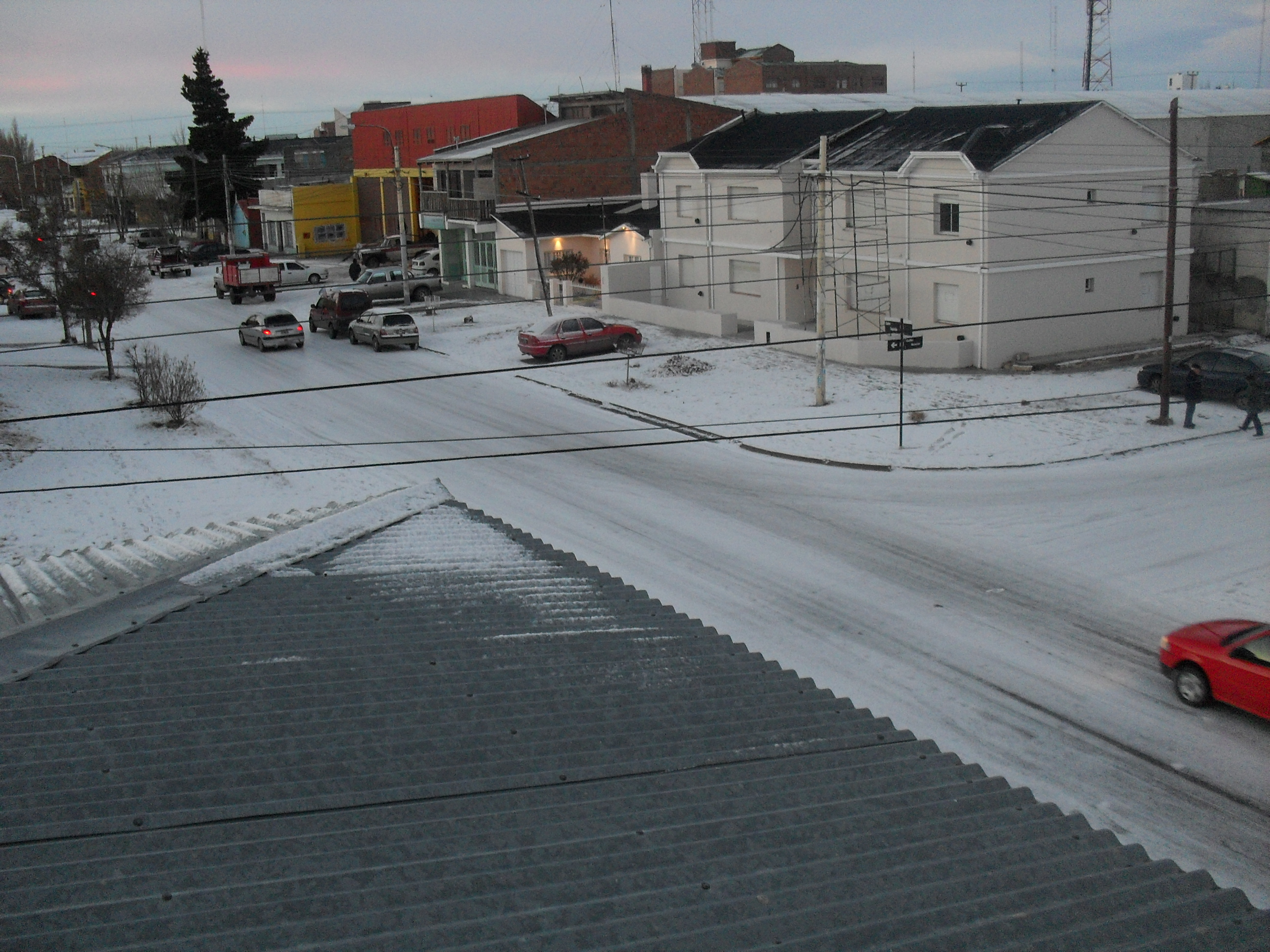
Rio Gallegos in winter

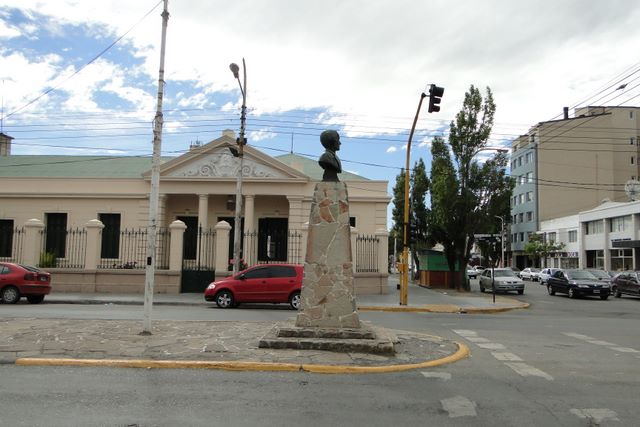
Rio Gallegos

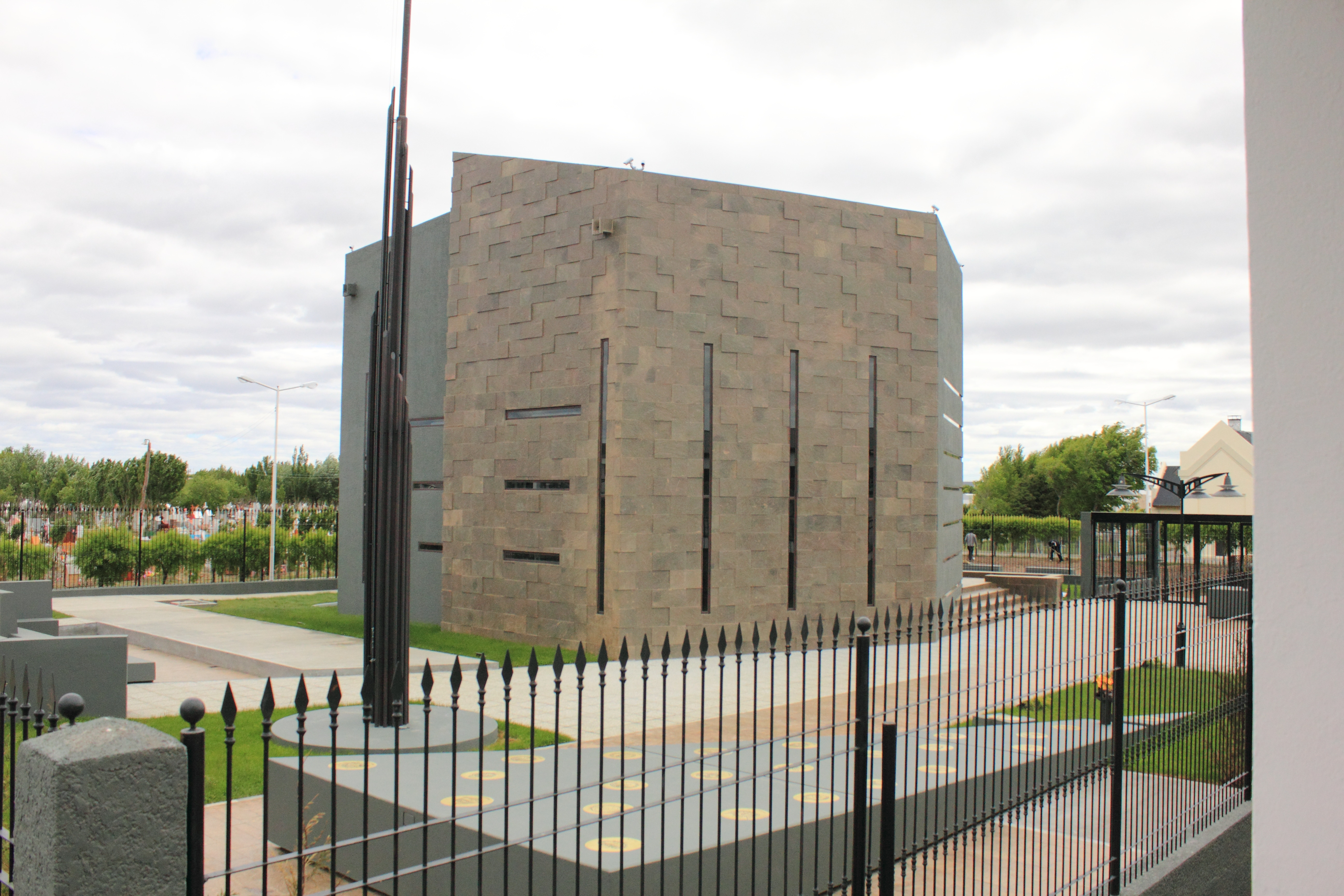
Kirchner Mausoleum

== Transportation ==
The city is served by Piloto Civil Norberto Fernández International Airport, with four commercial airlines, including Aerolineas Argentinas and an international one, LATAM Chile.

== See also ==
- 1949 Tierra del Fuego earthquake
