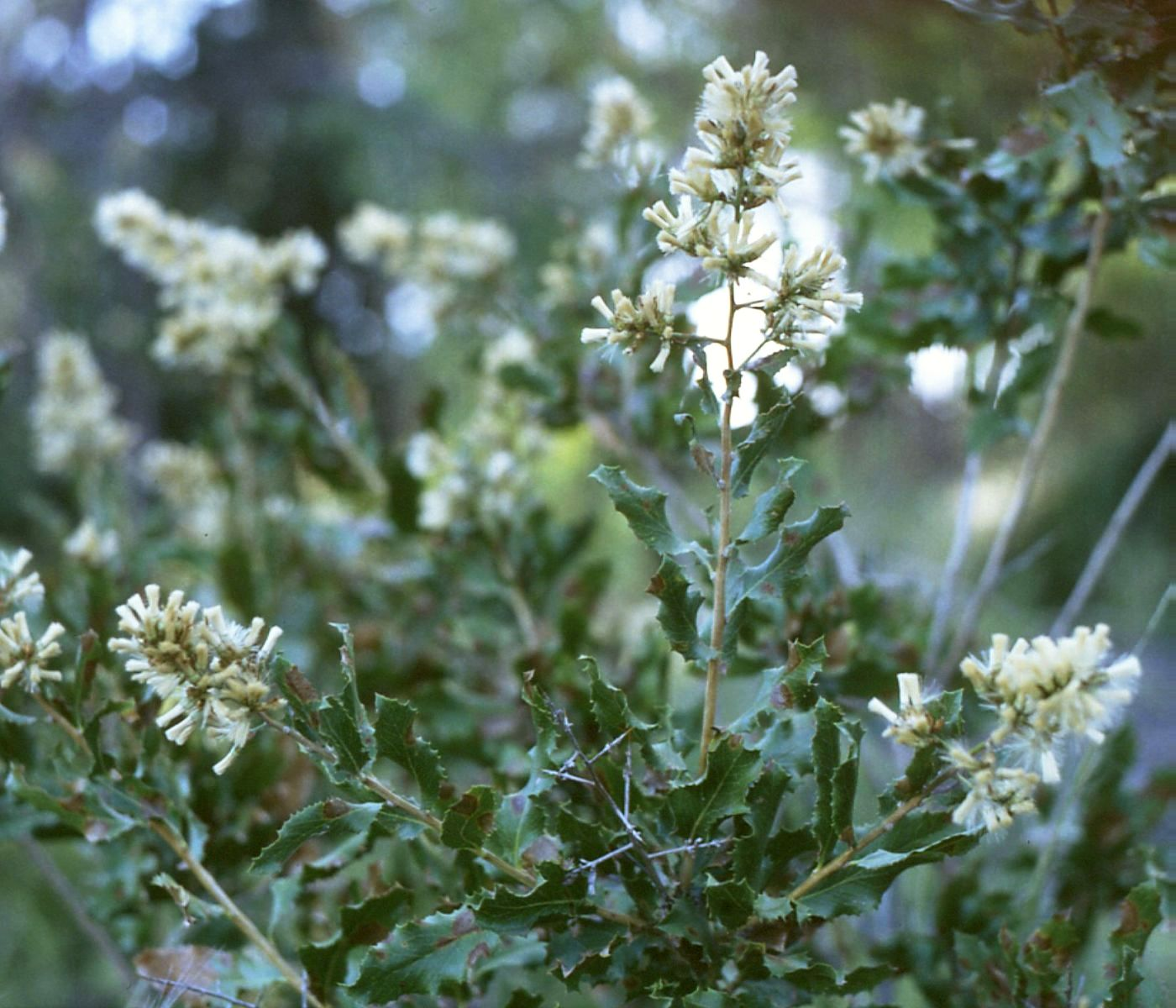
- Proustia cuneifolia var. mendocina

Scientific classification
- Kingdom: Plantae
- Clade: Tracheophytes
- Clade: Angiosperms
- Clade: Eudicots
- Clade: Asterids
- Order: Asterales
- Family: Asteraceae
- Subfamily: Mutisioideae
- Tribe: Nassauvieae
- Genus: Proustia; Lag.

Type species
- Proustia pyrifolia DC.

= Proustia =

Genus of plants

Proustia is a genus of flowering plants in the family Asteraceae, native to South America and the West Indies.

Species

- Proustia cuneifolia D.Don - Peru, Bolivia
- Proustia ilicifolia Hook. & Arn. - Argentina, Chile
- Proustia pyrifolia DC. - Chile
- Proustia vanillosma C.Wright - Cuba, Dominican Republic, Puerto Rico

formerly included

see Acourtia Berylsimpsonia Lophopappus Vernonanthura

- Proustia crassinervis Urb. - Berylsimpsonia crassinervis (Urb.) B.L.Turner
- Proustia cuneata S.F.Blake - Lophopappus blakei Cabrera
- Proustia domingensis Spreng. ex DC. - Vernonanthura buxifolia (Less.) H.Rob.
- Proustia mexicana Lag. ex D.Don - Acourtia humboldtii (Less.) B.L.Turner
- Proustia reticulata Lag. ex D.Don - Acourtia reticulata (Lag. ex D.Don) Reveal & R.M.King
