= Burkartia =

Scientific classification
- Kingdom: Plantae
- Clade: Embryophytes
- Clade: Tracheophytes
- Clade: Angiosperms
- Clade: Eudicots
- Clade: Asterids
- Order: Asterales
- Family: Asteraceae
- Subfamily: Mutisioideae
- Tribe: Nassauvieae
- Genus: Burkartia; Crisci
- Species: B. lanigera

Binomial name
- Burkartia lanigera (Hook. & Arn.) Crisci

Synonyms
- Perezia lanigera

Genus of flowering plants

Burkartia is a monotypic genus of flowering plants in the family Asteraceae, containing the single species Burkartia lanigera. It is endemic to southern Argentina (Provinces of Chubut, Rio Negro, Santa Cruz).

This species was formerly in genus Perezia, but it was separated because it has woolly trichomes in the leaf axils, a character not seen in any other Perezia. The genus Burkartia was erected for it in 1976. Molecular phylogenetic analyses in 2009 supported its separation from Perezia.
