= Perezia =

Perezia may refer to:

- Perezia (plant), a genus of flowering plants in the family Asteraceae
- Perezia (microsporidian), a fungus genus in the division Microsporidia
