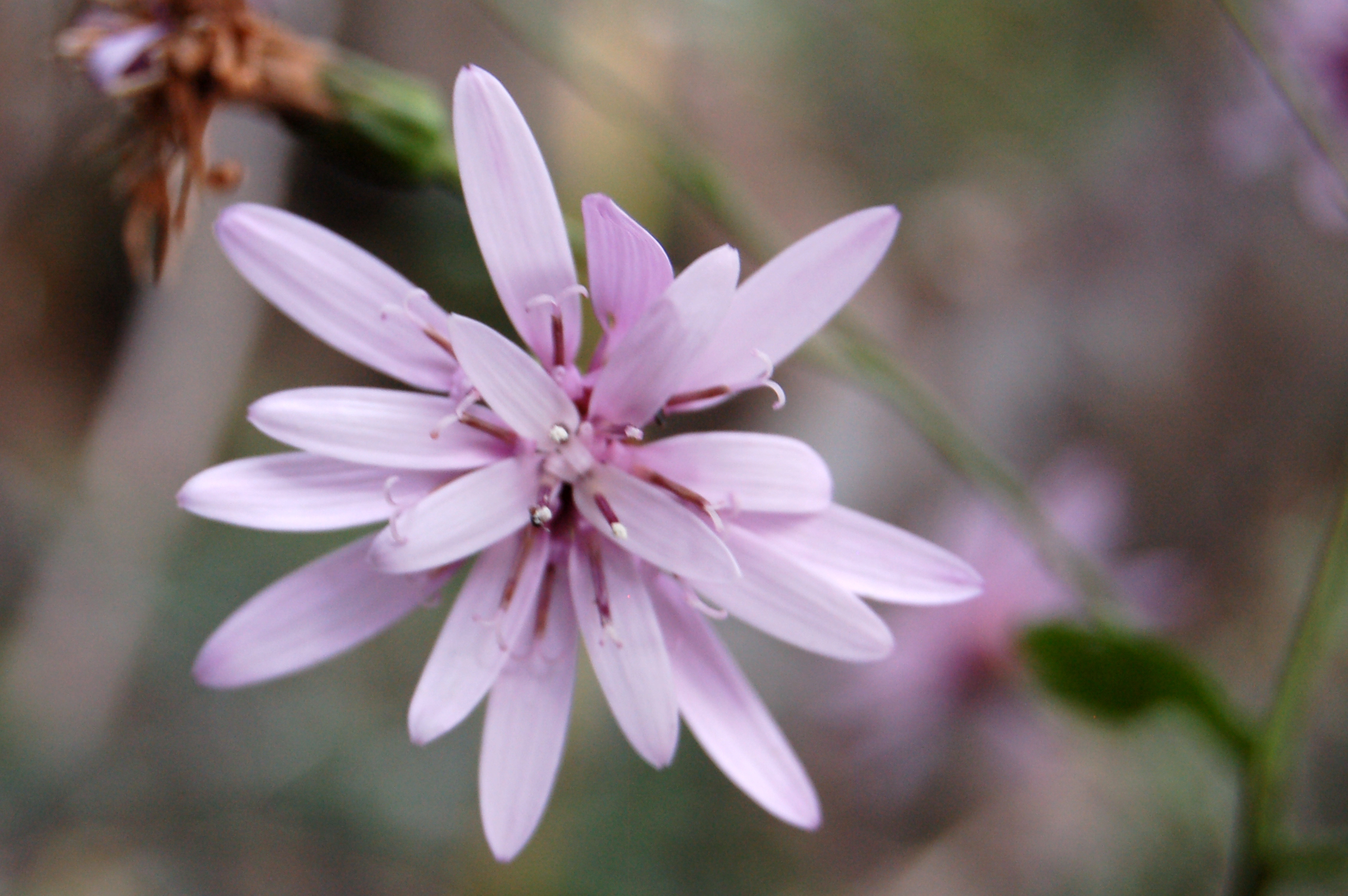
- Calorezia nutans

Scientific classification
- Kingdom: Plantae
- Clade: Embryophytes
- Clade: Tracheophytes
- Clade: Spermatophytes
- Clade: Angiosperms
- Clade: Eudicots
- Clade: Asterids
- Order: Asterales
- Family: Asteraceae
- Subfamily: Mutisioideae
- Tribe: Nassauvieae
- Genus: Calorezia; Panero

Type species
- Calorezia nutans (Less.) Panero

= Calorezia =

Genus of flowering plants

Calorezia is a small genus of flowering plants in the family Asteraceae. It is made up of two species that were separated from genus Perezia in 2007. As of May 2024, the separation was accepted by Plants of the World Online, but other sources retain the species in Perezia. The two species are perennial herbs with pink-purple flowers.

Species

- Calorezia nutans (Less.) Panero - Chile, Argentina
- Calorezia prenanthoides (Less.) Panero - Chile, Argentina
