= Bowmania =

Bowmania is the scientific name of two genera of organisms and may refer to:

- Bowmania (plant), a genus of plants in the family Asteraceae, currently regarded as a synonym of Trixis
- Bowmania (trilobite), a genus of trilobites in the order Harpetida
