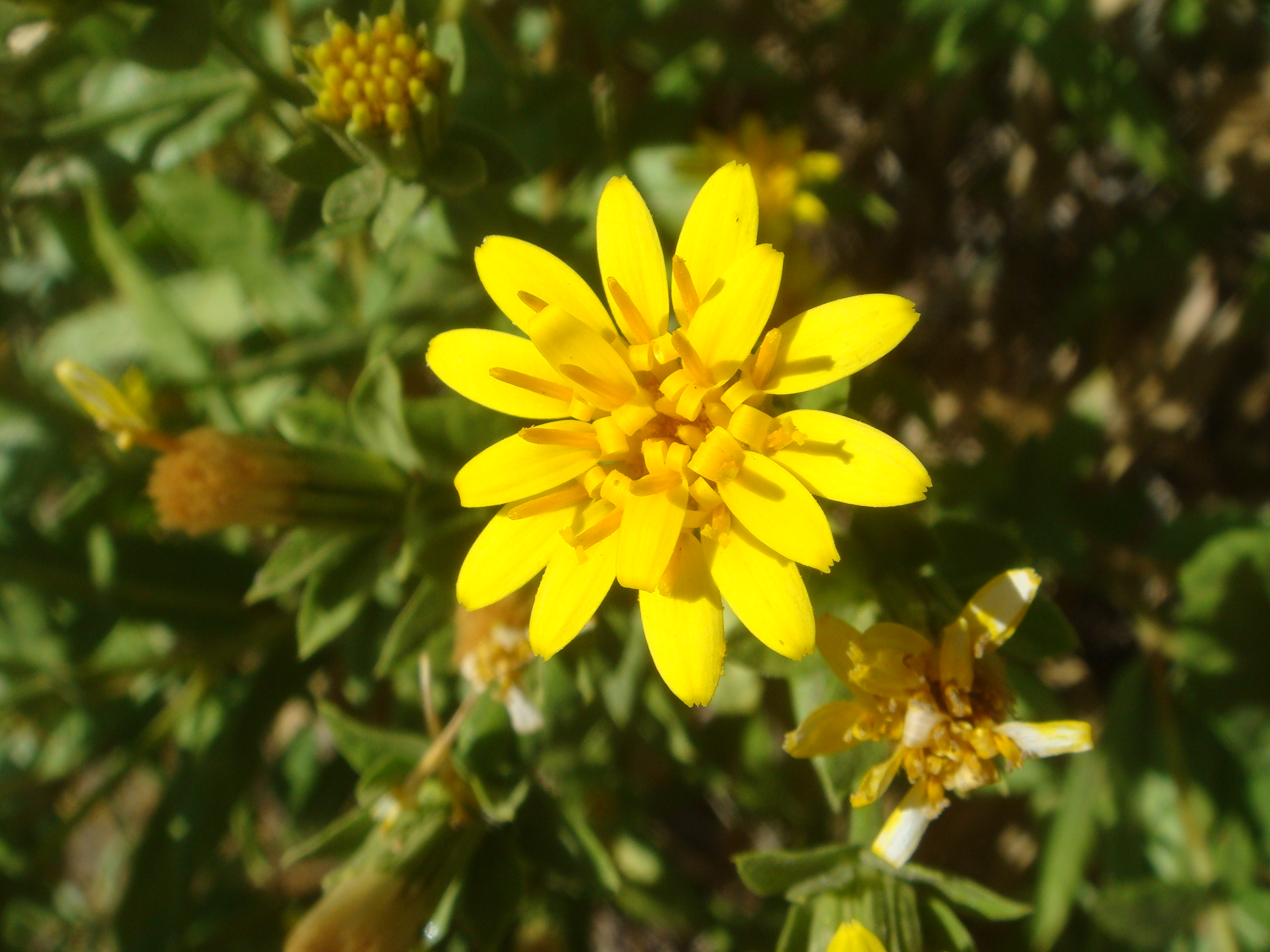
- Trixis californica

Scientific classification
- Kingdom: Plantae
- Clade: Tracheophytes
- Clade: Angiosperms
- Clade: Eudicots
- Clade: Asterids
- Order: Asterales
- Family: Asteraceae
- Subfamily: Mutisioideae
- Tribe: Nassauvieae
- Genus: Trixis; P.Browne 1756 not Adans. 1763 (Haloragaceae) nor Sw. 1788 (syn of Clibadium in Asteraceae)

Synonyms
- Prionanthes Schrank; Bowmania Gardner; Cleanthes D.Don; Bowmannia Gardner; Tenorea Colla; Castra Vell.

= Trixis =

Genus of shrubs

Trixis is a genus of shrubs in the family Asteraceae, native to North and South America including the West Indies.

Members of the genus are commonly known as threefolds due to the outer lip of the corolla. The generic name is derived from τριχος (trixos), the Greek word for 'threefold'.

Species

- Trixis aggregata Rusby - Bolivia
- Trixis alata D.Don - Guerrero, México State, Guanajuato
- Trixis angustifolia DC. - San Luis Potosí
- Trixis anomala B.L.Turner - Chiapas
- Trixis antimenorrhoea (Schrank) Mart. ex Baker - South America
- Trixis bowmanii Baker - Brazil
- Trixis cacalioides (Kunth) D.Don - Peru
- Trixis calcicola B.L.Rob. - Guerrero
- Trixis californica Kellogg – American threefold - USA (CA AZ NM TX), Mexico (Baja California, Baja California Sur, Sonora, Chihuahua, Coahuila, Durango, Zacatecas, Nuevo León)
- Trixis chiapensis C.E.Anderson - Guatemala, Chiapas
- Trixis erosa Sw. - Costa Rica, West Indies
- Trixis glaziovii Baker - Paraná, Rio de Janeiro
- Trixis grandibracteata C.E.Anderson - Guerrero
- Trixis grisebachii Kuntze - Bolivia, northern Argentina
- Trixis haenkei Sch.Bip. - Durango, Sinaloa
- Trixis hassleri Chodat - Paraguay
- Trixis hyposericea S.Wats. - Jalisco, Michoacán, Nayarit
- Trixis inula Crantz – Tropical threefold - USA (TX), Mexico, Central America, West Indies, Colombia, Venezuela
- Trixis lessingii DC. - Paraguay, Uruguay, Brazil
- Trixis longifolia D.Don - México State, Sinaloa
- Trixis megalophylla Greenm. - México State, Oaxaca, Puebla
- Trixis mexicana Lex. - Michoacán
- Trixis michuacana Lex. - Michoacán, Jalisco, Nayarit
- Trixis nelsonii Greenm. - Guatemala, Chiapas, Oaxaca
- Trixis nobilis (Vell.) Katinas - Paraguay, Uruguay, Brazil, Argentina
- Trixis ophiorhiza Gardner - Bolivia, Brazil
- Trixis pallida Less. - Paraguay, Uruguay, Brazil, Argentina
- Trixis parviflora C.E.Anderson - Oaxaca
- Trixis peruviana Katinas - Peru
- Trixis praestans (Vell.) Cabrera - Paraguay, Uruguay, Brazil, Argentina
- Trixis pringlei B.L.Rob. & Greenm. - Guerrero, Oaxaca
- Trixis proustioides Hieron. - Colombia
- Trixis pterocaulis B.L.Rob. & Greenm. - Colima, Jalisco, Nayarit, Sinaloa, Sonora
- Trixis silvatica B.L.Rob. & Greenm. - Oaxaca
- Trixis spicata Gardner - Paraguay, Uruguay, Brazil
- Trixis thyrsoidea Dusén ex Malme - southern Brazil
- Trixis vauthieri DC. - eastern Brazil
- Trixis verbascifolia (Gardner) S.F.Blake - Minas Gerais, Rio de Janeiro
- Trixis villosa (Spreng.) Sch.Bip. - Brazil

Formerly included

Numerous species once included in Trixis but now considered better suited to other genera: Acourtia Clibadium Dolichlasium Holocheilus Perezia Riencourtia
