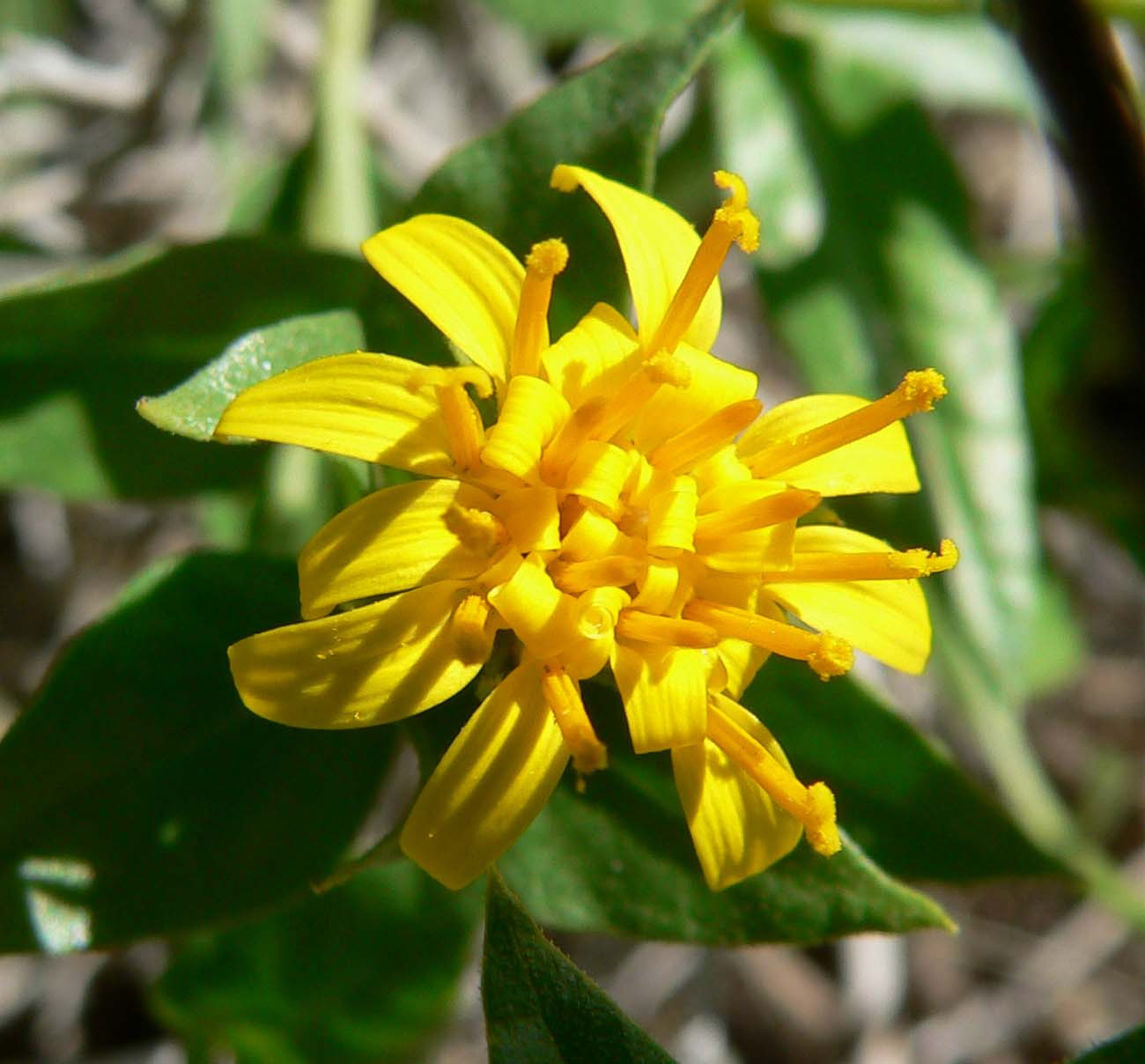
- Trixis californica

Scientific classification
- Kingdom: Plantae
- Clade: Tracheophytes
- Clade: Angiosperms
- Clade: Eudicots
- Clade: Asterids
- Order: Asterales
- Family: Asteraceae
- Subfamily: Mutisioideae
- Tribe: Nassauvieae; Cass.

= Nassauvieae =

Tribe of flowering plants

The Nassauvieae are a tribe of flowering plants in the family Asteraceae.

Genera

- Acourtia D.Don (65 spp.)
- Ameghinoa Speg.
- Berylsimpsonia B. L. Turner
- Burkartia Crisci (one sp.)
- Calopappus Meyen
- Calorezia Panero
- Cephalopappus Nees & Mart.
- Criscia Katinas (one sp.)
- Dolichlasium Lag.
- Holocheilus Cass. (seven spp.)
- Jungia L. f.
- Leucheria Lag.
- Leunisia Phil.
- Lophopappus Rusby
- Macrachaenium Hook f. (one sp.)
- Marticorenia Crisci (one sp.)
- Moscharia Ruiz & Pav.
- Nassauvia Comm. ex Juss.
- Oxyphyllum Phil.
- Pamphalea Lag. (9 spp.)
- Perezia Lag.
- Pleocarphus D.Don: (one sp.)
- Polyachyrus Lag.
- Proustia Lag.
- Triptilion Ruiz & Pav.
- Trixis P.Br. (50 spp.)
