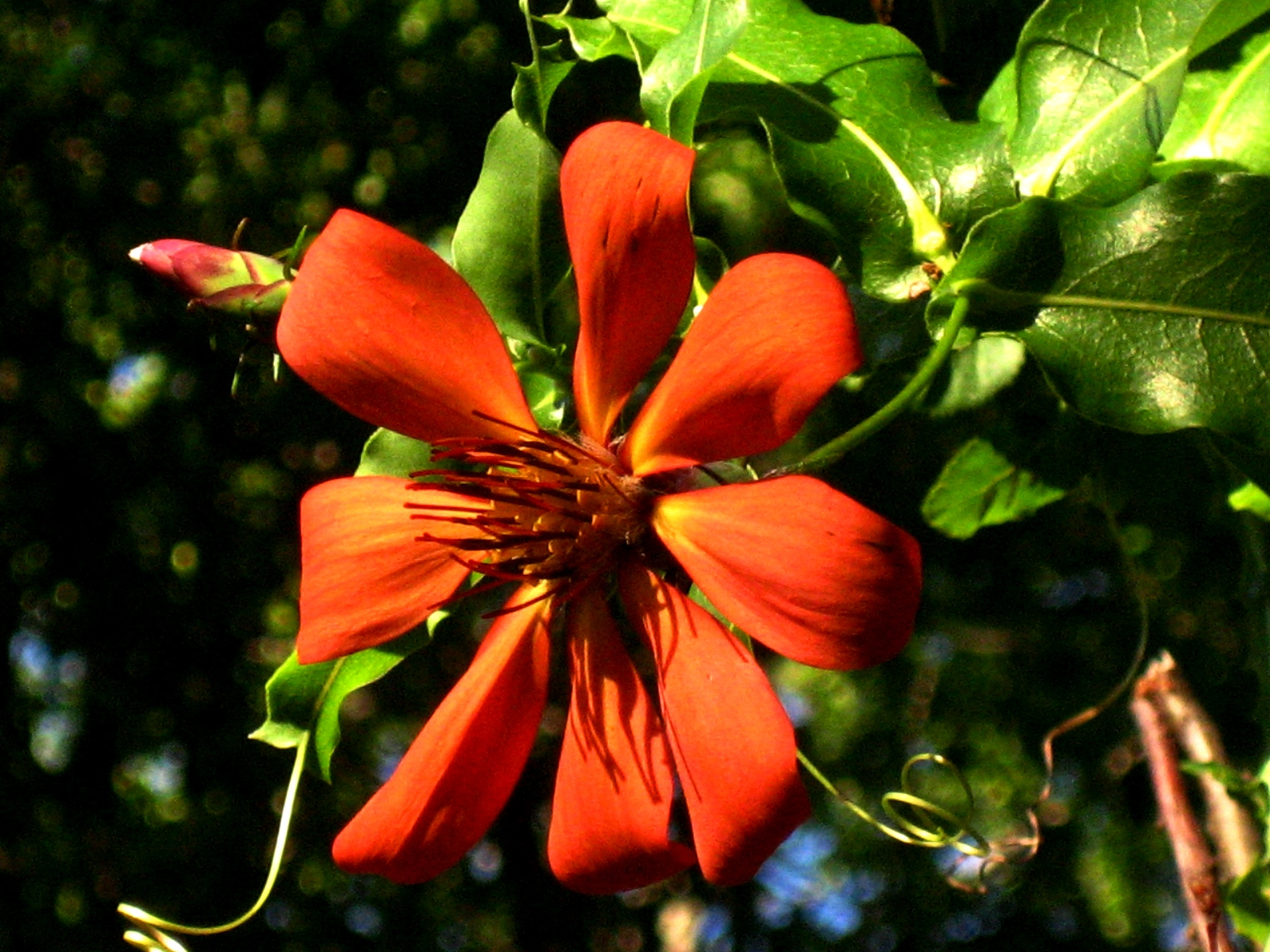
- Mutisia cana

Scientific classification
- Kingdom: Plantae
- Clade: Tracheophytes
- Clade: Angiosperms
- Clade: Eudicots
- Clade: Asterids
- Order: Asterales
- Family: Asteraceae
- Subfamily: Mutisioideae (Cass.) Lindl.

Tribes
- Mutisieae; Nassauvieae; Onoserideae

= Mutisioideae =

Subfamily of flowering plants

The Mutisioideae are a subfamily in the plant family Asteraceae that includes about 630 species assigned to 44 different genera. This subfamily is mainly native in South America, except for Adenocaulon, Chaptalia, Gerbera, Trichocline, which have species in all continents other than Europe and Antarctica. Common characters are the deeply incised corollas of the disc florets, with five lobes, sometimes merged in two lips, flower heads with overlapping involucral bracts, anthers with tails and pointy tips, the styles usually stick far out of the florets and are essentially hairless. Most species are herbs, but some are vines, shrubs, or small trees.

== Taxonomy ==
The subfamily Mutisioideae consists of three tribes:

Tribe Mutisieae

- Adenocaulon Hook. (five species)
- Brachyclados Gillies ex D.Don (three spp.)
- Chaetanthera Ruiz & Pav. (47 spp.)
- Chaptalia Vent. (69 spp.)
- Eriachaenium Sch.Bip (one sp.)
- Gerbera L. (40 spp.)
- Leibnitzia Cass. (eight spp.)
- Lulia Zardini (one sp.)
- Mutisia L.f. (58 spp.)
- Oreoseris DC. (12 spp.)
- Pachylaena D.Don ex Hook. (two spp.)
- Perdicium L. (two spp.)
- Trichocline Cass. (24 spp.)

Tribe Onoserideae

- Aphyllocladus Wedd.
- Gypothamnium Phil. (one sp.)
- Lycoseris Cass.
- Onoseris Willd.
- Plazia Ruiz & Pav
- Paquirea Panero, J. & S. E. Freire. (1 sp.)
- Urmenetea Phil.

Tribe Nassauvieae

- Acourtia D.Don (65 spp.)
- Ameghinoa Speg.
- Berylsimpsonia B. L. Turner
- Burkartia Crisci (one sp.)
- Calopappus Meyen
- Calorezia Panero
- Cephalopappus Nees & Mart.
- Criscia Katinas (one sp.)
- Dolichlasium Lag.
- Holocheilus Cass. (seven spp.)
- Jungia L. f.
- Leucheria Lag.
- Leunisia Phil.
- Lophopappus Rusby
- Macrachaenium Hook f. (one sp.)
- Marticorenia Crisci (one sp.)
- Moscharia Ruiz & Pav.
- Nassauvia Comm. ex Juss.
- Oxyphyllum Phil.
- Pamphalea Lag. (9 spp.)
- Perezia Lag.
- Pleocarphus D.Don: (one sp.)
- Polyachyrus Lag.
- Proustia Lag.
- Triptilion Ruiz & Pav.
- Trixis P.Br. (50 spp.)

=== Some species ===
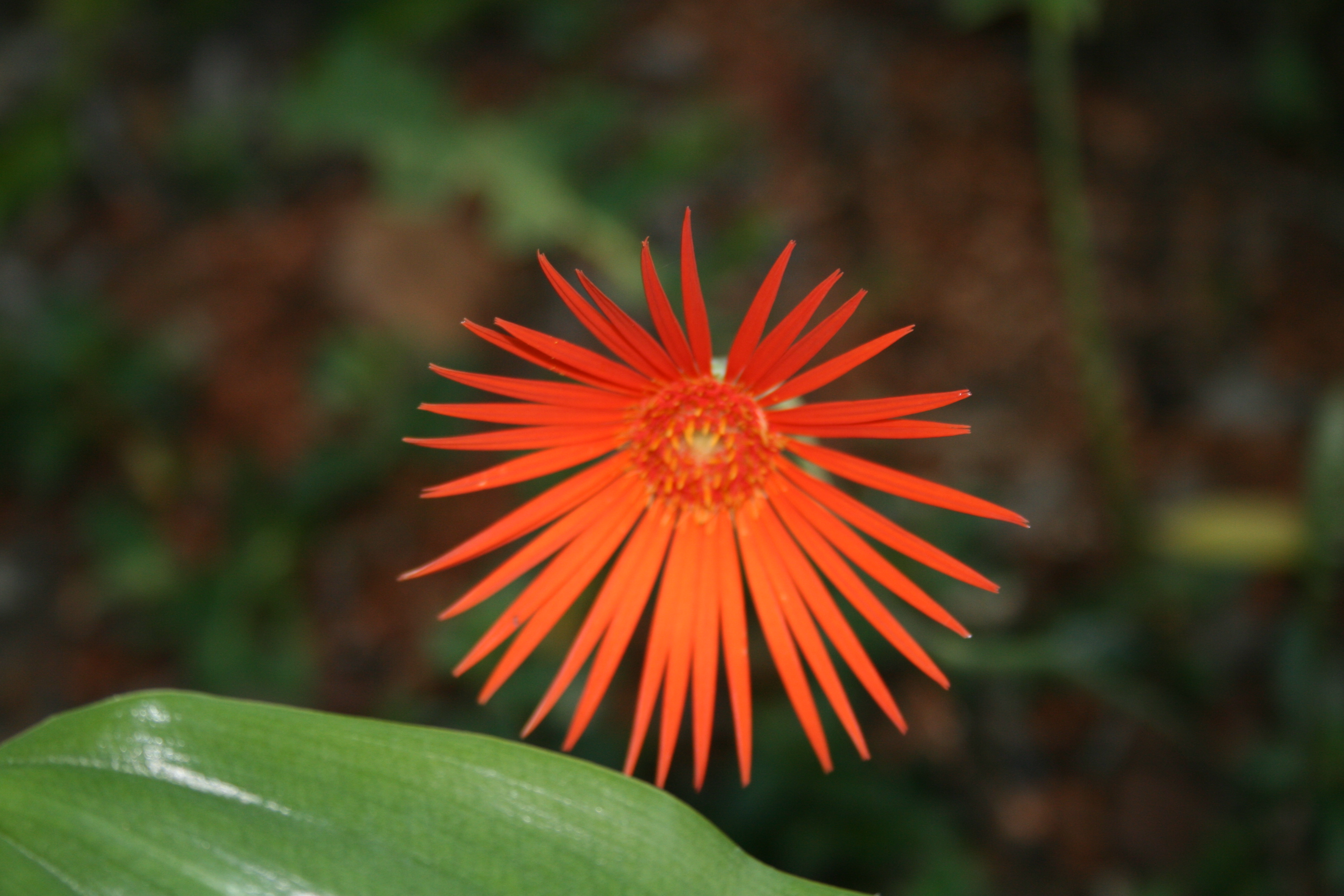
Gerbera jamesonii
(Mutisieae)

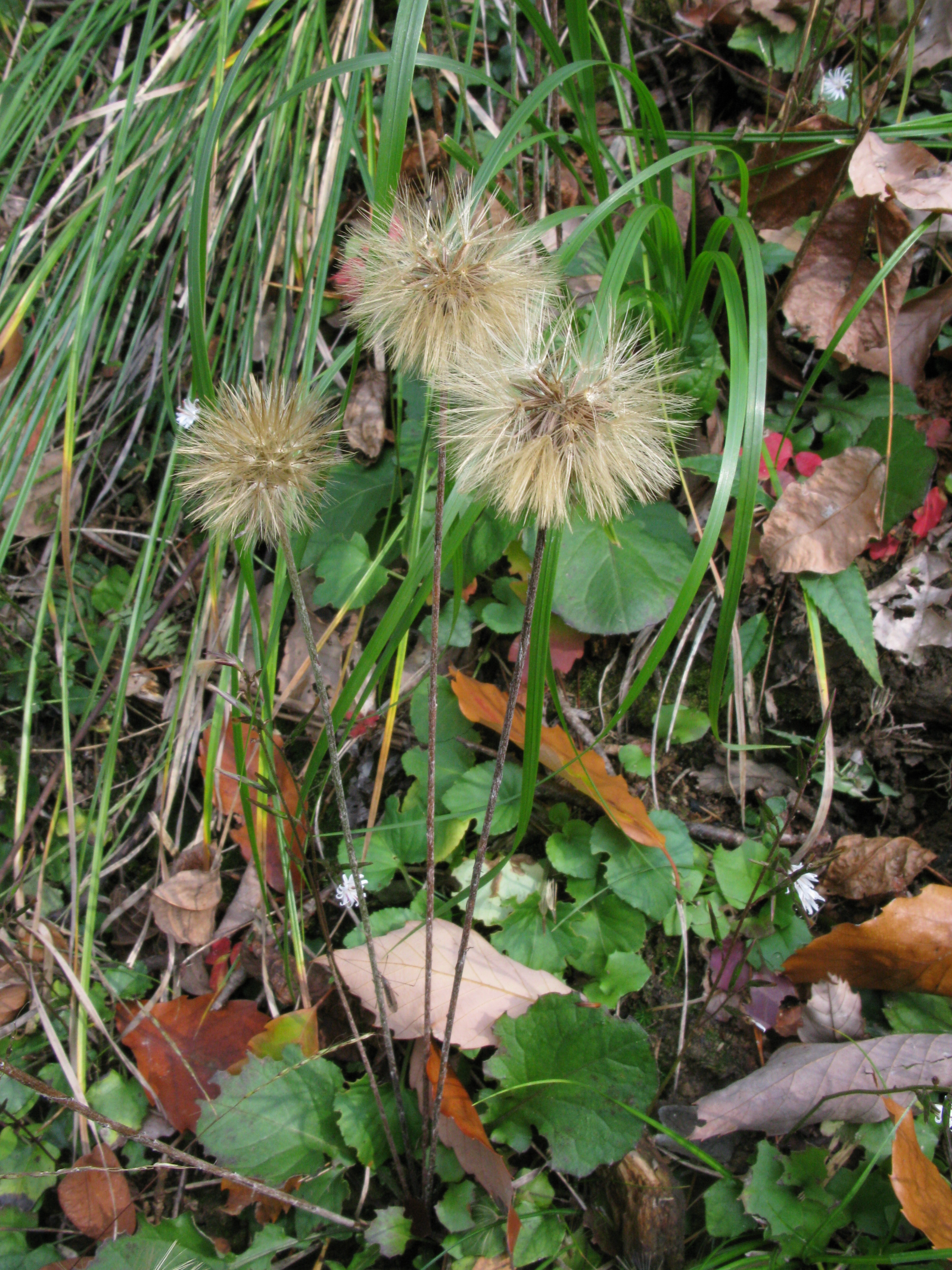
Leibnitzia anandria
(Mutisieae)

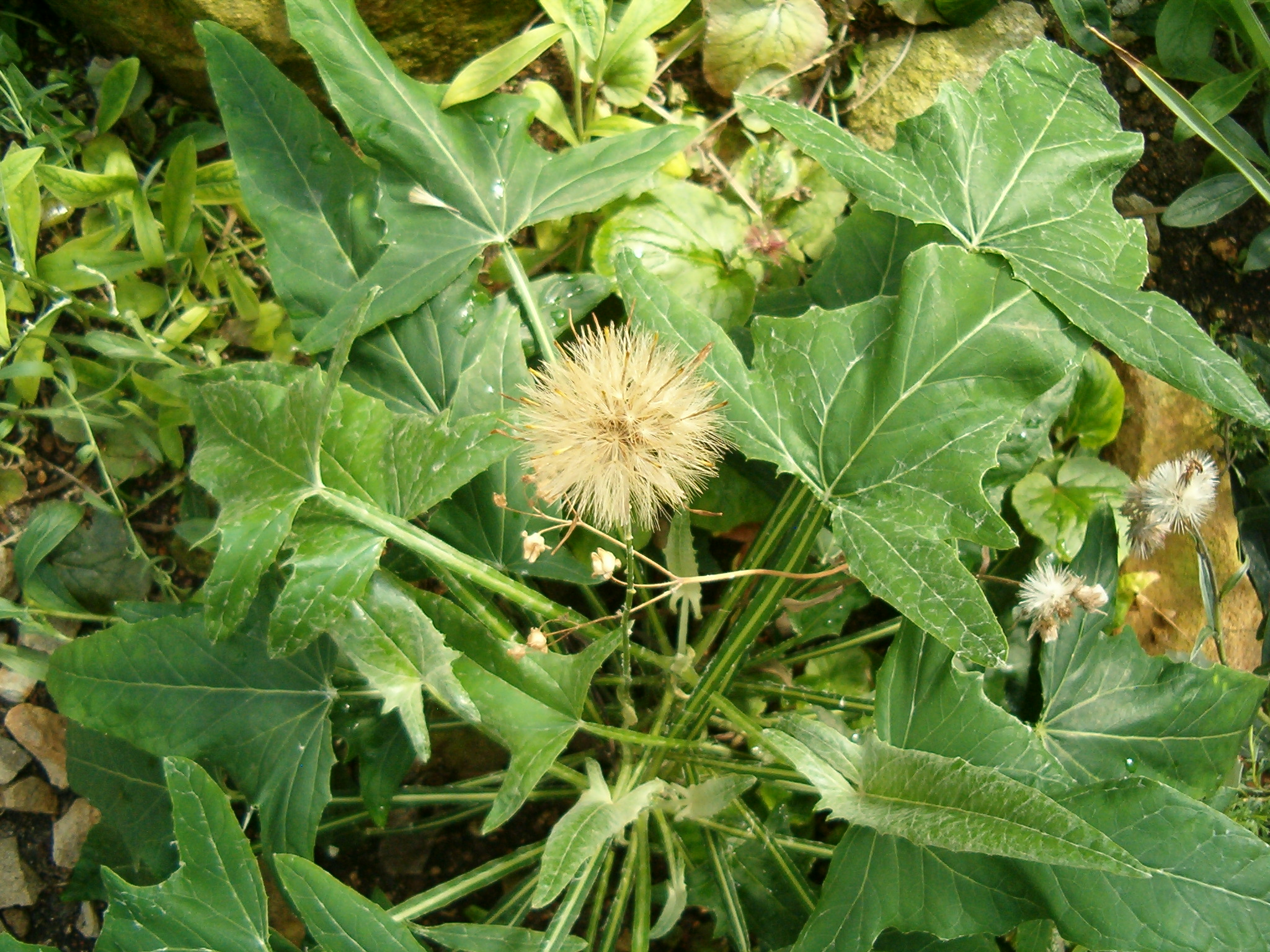
Onoseris alata
(Onoserideae)

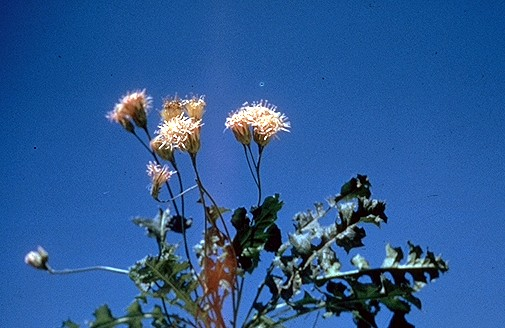
Acourtia runcinata
(Nassauvieae)

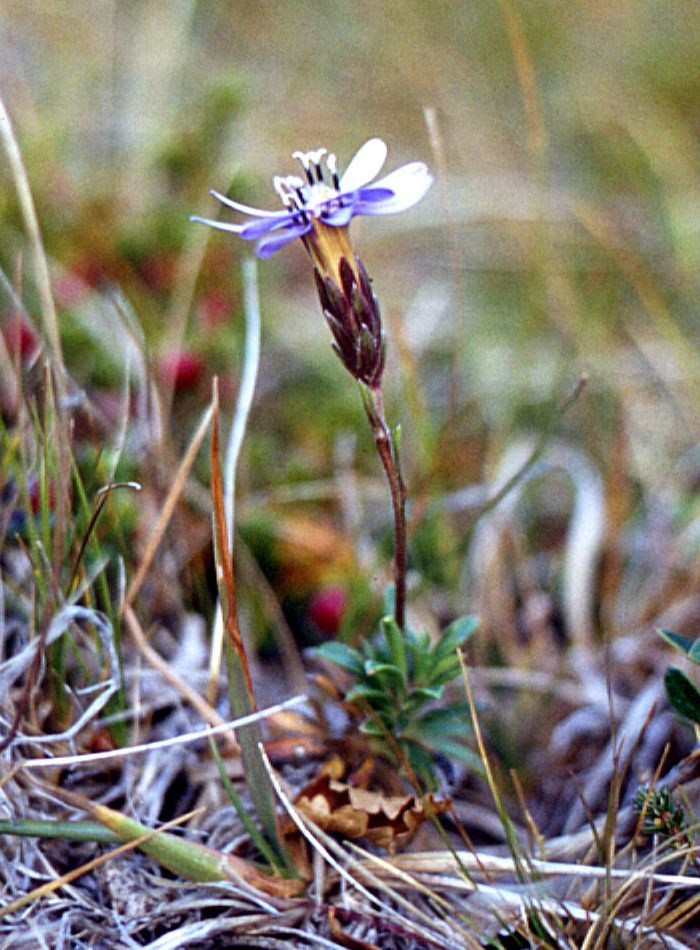
Perezia recurvata
(Nassauvieae)

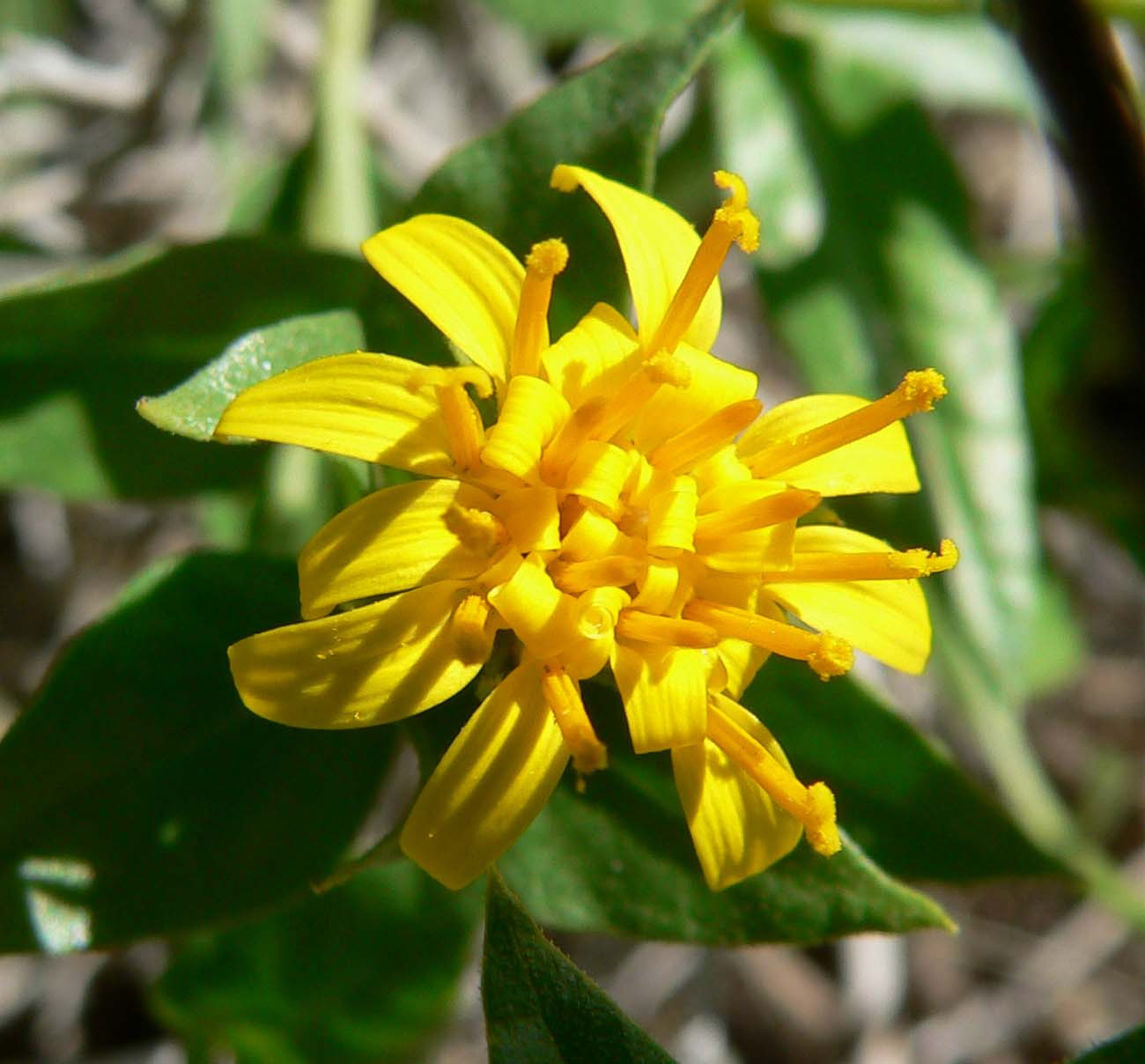
Trixis californica
(Nassauvieae)
