= N. darwinii =

N. darwinii may refer to:

- Nassauvia darwinii, a flowering plant in the genus Nassauvia
- Necterosoma darwinii, a beetle in the genus Necterosoma
- Nothura darwinii, a bird, Darwin's nothura

== See also ==
- N. darwini (disambiguation)
- Darwinii (disambiguation)
