= Criscia =

Scientific classification
- Kingdom: Plantae
- Clade: Tracheophytes
- Clade: Angiosperms
- Clade: Eudicots
- Clade: Asterids
- Order: Asterales
- Family: Asteraceae
- Subfamily: Mutisioideae
- Tribe: Nassauvieae
- Genus: Criscia; Katinas
- Species: C. stricta

Binomial name
- Criscia stricta (Spreng.) Katinas

Synonyms
- Onoseris stricta Spreng.; Trixis stricta (Spreng.) Less.; Trichocline heterophylla Griseb.; Perezia pampeana Speg.

Genus of flowering plants

Criscia is a genus of South American flowering plants in the family Asteraceae.

Species

The only known species is Criscia stricta, native to Uruguay, Brazil (Rio Grande do Sul, Paraná), and Argentina (Buenos Aires, Misiones, Corrientes, Entre Ríos).
