= Ameghinoa =

Scientific classification
- Kingdom: Plantae
- Clade: Tracheophytes
- Clade: Angiosperms
- Clade: Eudicots
- Clade: Asterids
- Order: Asterales
- Family: Asteraceae
- Subfamily: Mutisioideae
- Tribe: Nassauvieae
- Genus: Ameghinoa; Speg.
- Species: A. patagonica

Binomial name
- Ameghinoa patagonica Speg.

Genus of flowering plants

Ameghinoa is a genus of flowering plants in the family Asteraceae, described in 1897 by Carlo Luigi Spegazzini.

There is only one known species, Ameghinoa patagonica, native to the Chubut and Río Negro Provinces of Argentina.
