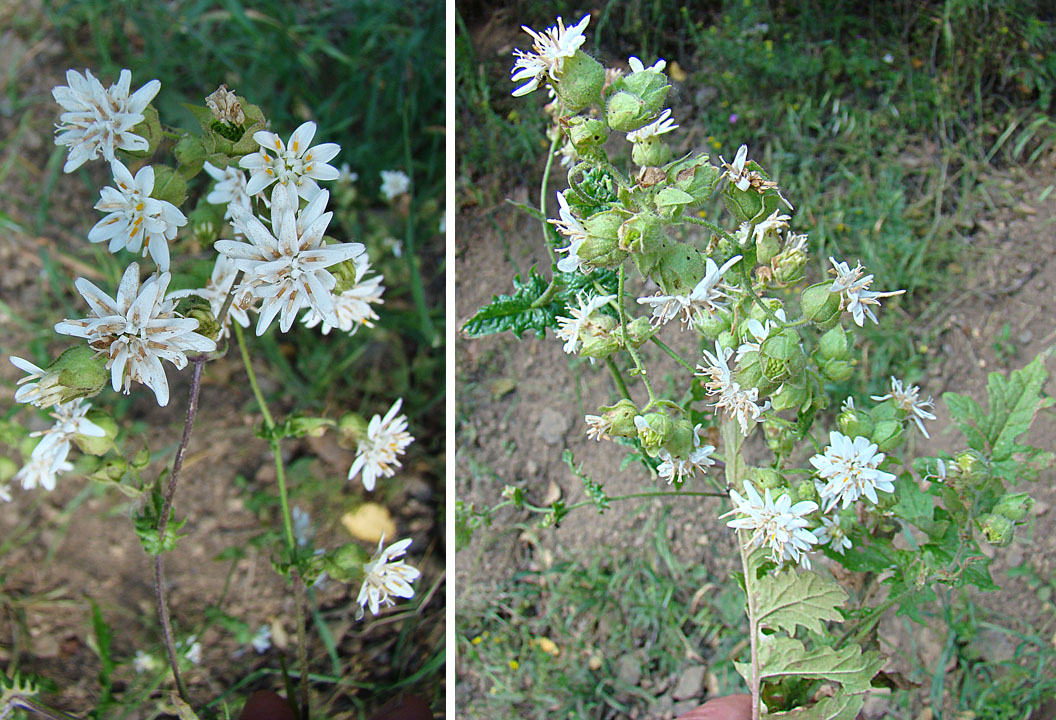
- Moscharia pinnatifida

Scientific classification
- Kingdom: Plantae
- Clade: Tracheophytes
- Clade: Angiosperms
- Clade: Eudicots
- Clade: Asterids
- Order: Asterales
- Family: Asteraceae
- Subfamily: Mutisioideae
- Tribe: Nassauvieae
- Genus: Moscharia; Ruiz & Pav.

Type species
- Moscharia pinnatifida Ruiz & Pav.

Species
- Moscharia pinnatifida Ruiz & Pav.; Moscharia solbrigii Crisci

Synonyms
- Gastrocarpha D.Don; Moschifera Molina; Mosigia Spreng.

= Moscharia =

Genus of flowering plants

Moscharia is a genus of flowering plants in the family Asteraceae native to central Chile. It has two accepted species.

- Moscharia pinnatifida Ruiz & Pav.
- Moscharia solbrigii Crisci
