= Pamphalea =

- P. commersonii

Scientific classification
- Kingdom: Plantae
- Clade: Tracheophytes
- Clade: Angiosperms
- Clade: Eudicots
- Clade: Asterids
- Order: Asterales
- Family: Asteraceae
- Subfamily: Mutisioideae
- Tribe: Nassauvieae
- Genus: Pamphalea; Lag.

Type species
- Pamphalea commersonii Cass.

Synonyms
- Ceratolepis Cass.

Genus of flowering plants

Pamphalea is a genus of flowering plants in the family Asteraceae. The genus was first described by Lagasca in 1811, who spelled it Panphalea. de Candolle emended the spelling to Pamphalea in 1812, and that spelling has been generally accepted.

Species

- Pamphalea araucariophila Cabrera - Rio Grande do Sul, Santa Catarina
- Pamphalea bupleurifolia Less. - Uruguay, Brazil (Rio Grande do Sul), Argentina (Buenos Aires, Corrientes, Entre Ríos)
- Pamphalea cardaminifolia Less. - Rio Grande do Sul, Santa Catarina
- Pamphalea commersonii Cass. - Rio Grande do Sul, Paraná, Uruguay
- Pamphalea heterophylla Less. - Rio Grande do Sul, Uruguay, Buenos Aires, Corrientes, Entre Ríos, Misiones
- Pamphalea maxima Less. - Rio Grande do Sul, Santa Catarina, Uruguay
- Pamphalea missionum Cabrera - Rio Grande do Sul, Corrientes, Paraguay, Misiones
- Pamphalea ramboi Cabrera - Rio Grande do Sul
- Pamphalea smithii Cabrera - Rio Grande do Sul, Paraná, Santa Catarina
- Pamphalea tenuissima C.Trujillo, Bonif. & E.Pasini
