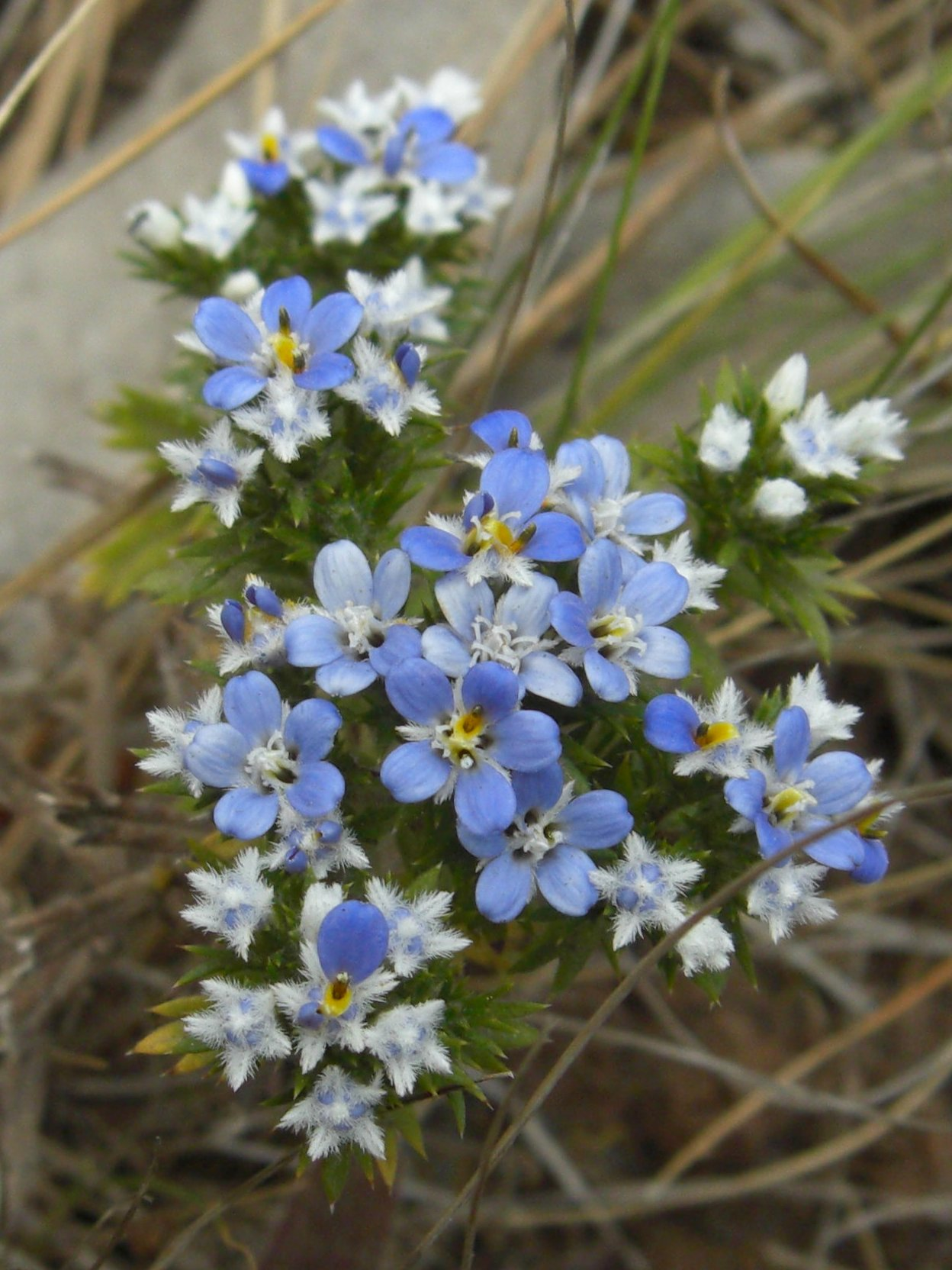
- Triptilion spinosum from coastal Chile, south of Pichilemu

Scientific classification
- Kingdom: Plantae
- Clade: Tracheophytes
- Clade: Angiosperms
- Clade: Eudicots
- Clade: Asterids
- Order: Asterales
- Family: Asteraceae
- Subfamily: Mutisioideae
- Tribe: Nassauvieae
- Genus: Triptilion; Ruiz & Pav.

Type species
- Triptilion spinosum Ruiz & Pavon

= Triptilion =

Genus of flowering plants

Triptilion is a genus of South American flowering plants in the family Asteraceae.

Species

- Triptilion achilleae DC. - Chile, Argentina
- Triptilion benaventei J.Rémy - Chile
- Triptilion berteroi Phil. - Chile
- Triptilion capillatum (D.Don) Hook. & Arn. - Chile, Argentina
- Triptilion cordifolium Lag. ex Lindl. - Chile
- Triptilion gibbosum J.Rémy - Chile
- Triptilion spinosum Ruiz & Pav. - Chile

formerly included

species now considered more suited to Nassauvia
