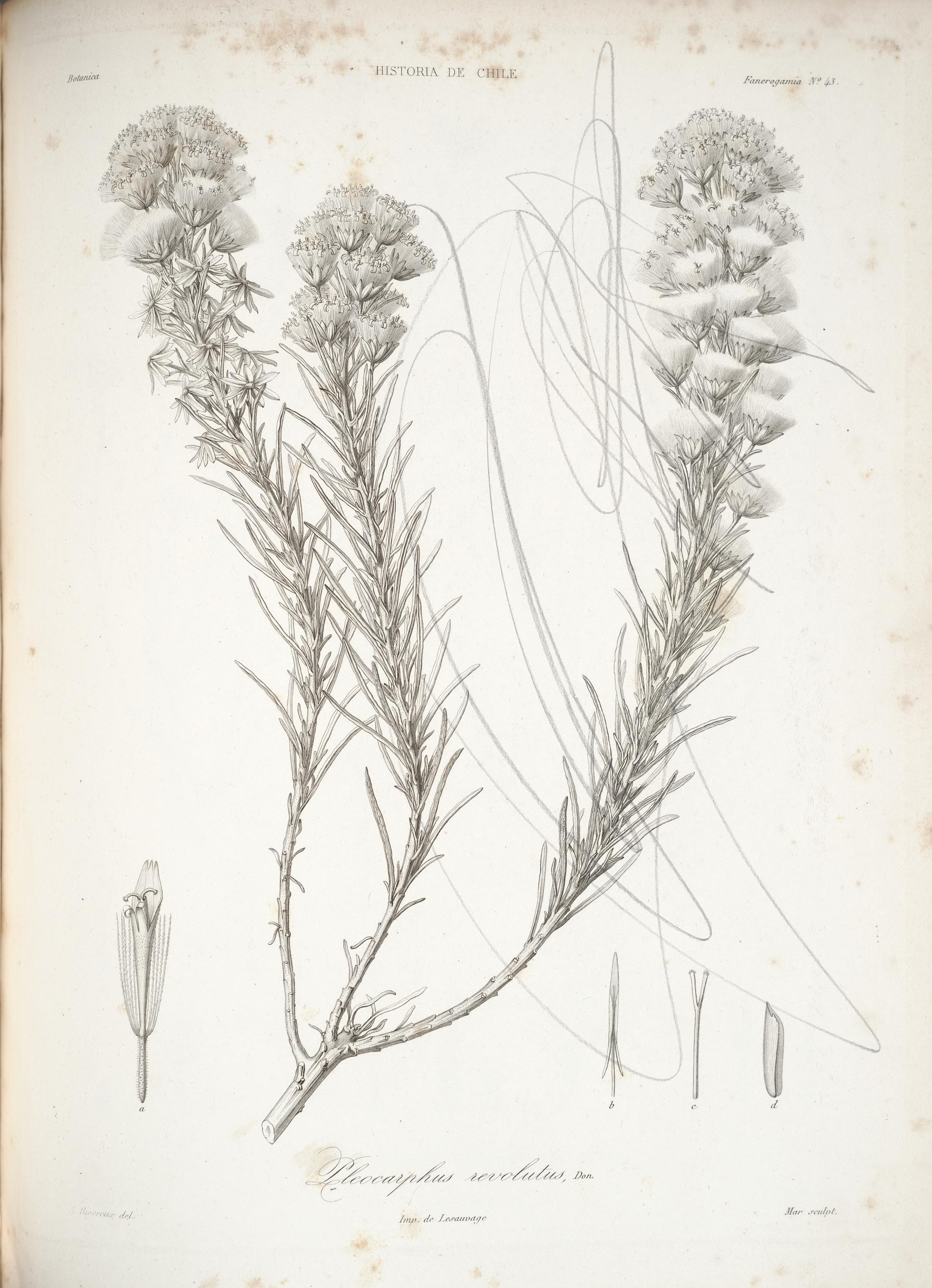

Scientific classification
- Kingdom: Plantae
- Clade: Tracheophytes
- Clade: Angiosperms
- Clade: Eudicots
- Clade: Asterids
- Order: Asterales
- Family: Asteraceae
- Subfamily: Mutisioideae
- Tribe: Nassauvieae
- Genus: Pleocarphus; D.Don
- Species: P. revolutus

Binomial name
- Pleocarphus revolutus D.Don

Synonyms
- Jungia revoluta (D.Don) Reiche; Pleocarphus dentatus Phil.; Jungia dentata (D.Don) Reiche; Carphephorus revolutifolius DC.; Jungia revoluta var. dentata (Phil.) Reiche

= Pleocarphus =

Species of plant

Pleocarphus is a genus of South American flowering plants in the family Asteraceae.

Species

There is only one known species, Pleocarphus revolutus, found only in Chile.
