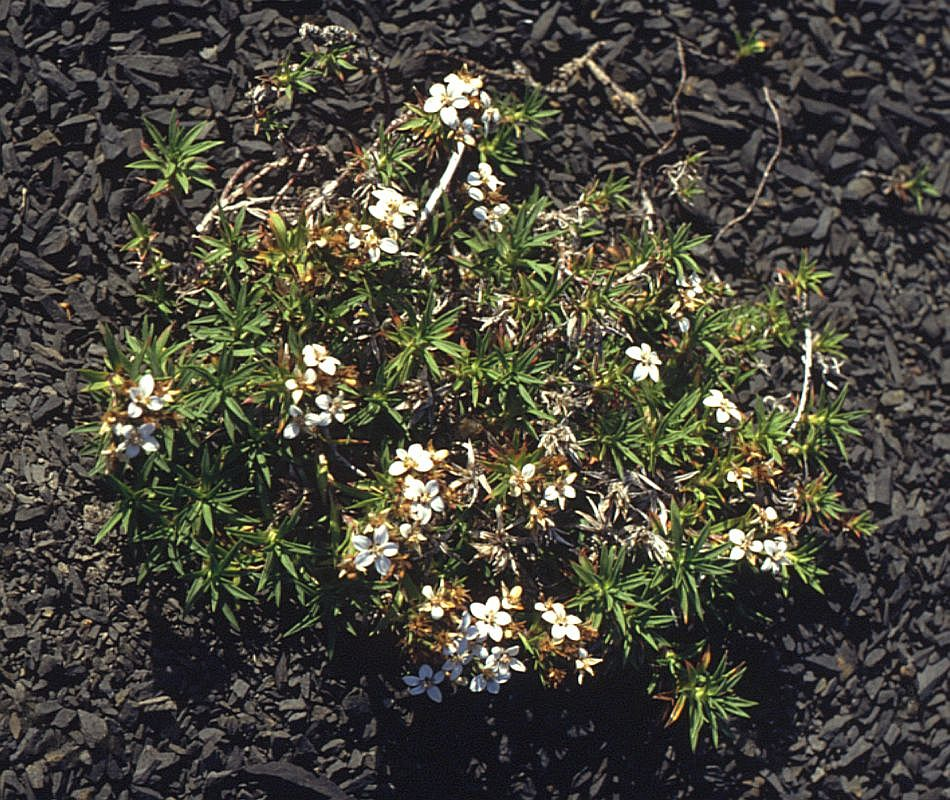
- Nassauvia aculeata

Scientific classification
- Kingdom: Plantae
- Clade: Embryophytes
- Clade: Tracheophytes
- Clade: Angiosperms
- Clade: Eudicots
- Clade: Asterids
- Order: Asterales
- Family: Asteraceae
- Subfamily: Mutisioideae
- Tribe: Nassauvieae
- Genus: Nassauvia; Comm. ex Juss.

Synonyms
- Caloptilium Lag.; Panargyrum D.Don; Acanthophyllum Hook. & Arn.; Triachne Cass.; Mastigophorus Cass.; Nassauvia sect. Mastigophorus (Cass.) DC.

= Nassauvia =

Genus of flowering plants

Nassauvia is a genus of flowering plants in the tribe Nassauvieae within the family Asteraceae. It is native to Argentina, Bolivia, Chile and the Falkland Islands.

Nassauvia is said to be chocolate scented.

== Species ==
- Nassauvia ameghinoi Speg.
- Nassauvia argentea Phil.
- Nassauvia argyrophylla Speg. ex Hosseus
- Nassauvia axillaris D.Don
- Nassauvia chubutensis Speg.
- Nassauvia coronipappa Arroyo & Martic.
- Nassauvia cumingii Hook. & Arn.
- Nassauvia darwinii (Hook. & Arn.) O.Hoffm. & Dusén
- Nassauvia dentata Griseb.
- Nassauvia digitata Wedd.
- Nassauvia dusenii O.Hoffm.
- Nassauvia fuegiana (Speg.) Cabrera
- Nassauvia gaudichaudii Cass.
- Nassauvia glomerata Wedd.
- Nassauvia glomerulosa D.Don
- Nassauvia hillii Cabrera
- Nassauvia juniperina Skottsb.
- Nassauvia lagascae Hauman
- Nassauvia lanata Reiche
- Nassauvia latissima Skottsb.
- Nassauvia looseri Cabrera
- Nassauvia maeviae Cabrera
- Nassauvia magellanica J.F.Gmel.
- Nassauvia nivalis Poepp. & Endl.
- Nassauvia pentacaenoides Speg.
- Nassauvia pinnigera D.Don
- Nassauvia planifolia Wedd.
- Nassauvia pulcherrima Cabrera
- Nassauvia pumila Poepp. & Endl.
- Nassauvia pygmaea Hook.f.
- Nassauvia pyramidalis Meyen
- Nassauvia ramosissima DC.
- Nassauvia revoluta D.Don
- Nassauvia ruizii Cabrera
- Nassauvia sceptrum Dusén
- Nassauvia serpens d'Urv.
- Nassauvia sprengelioides DC.
- Nassauvia sublobata Cabrera
- Nassauvia ulicina (Hook.f.) Macloskie
- Nassauvia uniflora (D.Don) Hauman

== Formerly included ==
Numerous species are now considered more suitable to other genera: Calopappus Triptilion
