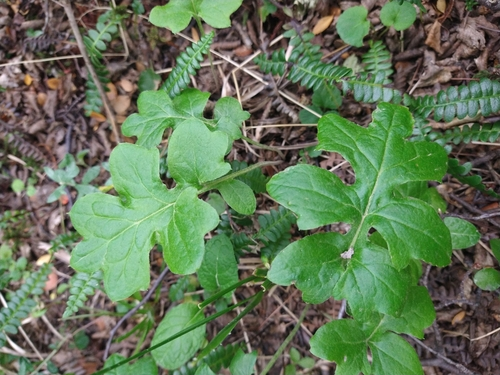

Scientific classification
- Kingdom: Plantae
- Clade: Tracheophytes
- Clade: Angiosperms
- Clade: Eudicots
- Clade: Asterids
- Order: Asterales
- Family: Asteraceae
- Subfamily: Mutisioideae
- Tribe: Nassauvieae
- Genus: Macrachaenium; Hook.f.
- Species: M. gracile

Binomial name
- Macrachaenium gracile Hook.f.

= Macrachaenium =

Genus of flowering plants

Macrachaenium is a genus of flowering plants in the family Asteraceae.

Species

There is only one known species, Macrachaenium gracile, native to Chile (Biobío, La Araucania, Aisén, Los Lagos, Magallanes) and Argentina (Chubut, Neuquén, Rio Negro, Santa Cruz, Tierra del Fuego).
