= Leunisia =

Scientific classification
- Kingdom: Plantae
- Clade: Tracheophytes
- Clade: Angiosperms
- Clade: Eudicots
- Clade: Asterids
- Order: Asterales
- Family: Asteraceae
- Subfamily: Mutisioideae
- Tribe: Nassauvieae
- Genus: Leunisia; Phil.
- Species: L. laeta

Binomial name
- Leunisia laeta Phil.

Species of plant

Leunisia is a genus of Chilean flowering plants in the family Asteraceae.

Species

There is only one known species, Leunisia laeta, native to the Coquimbo and Valparaíso Regions of Chile.
