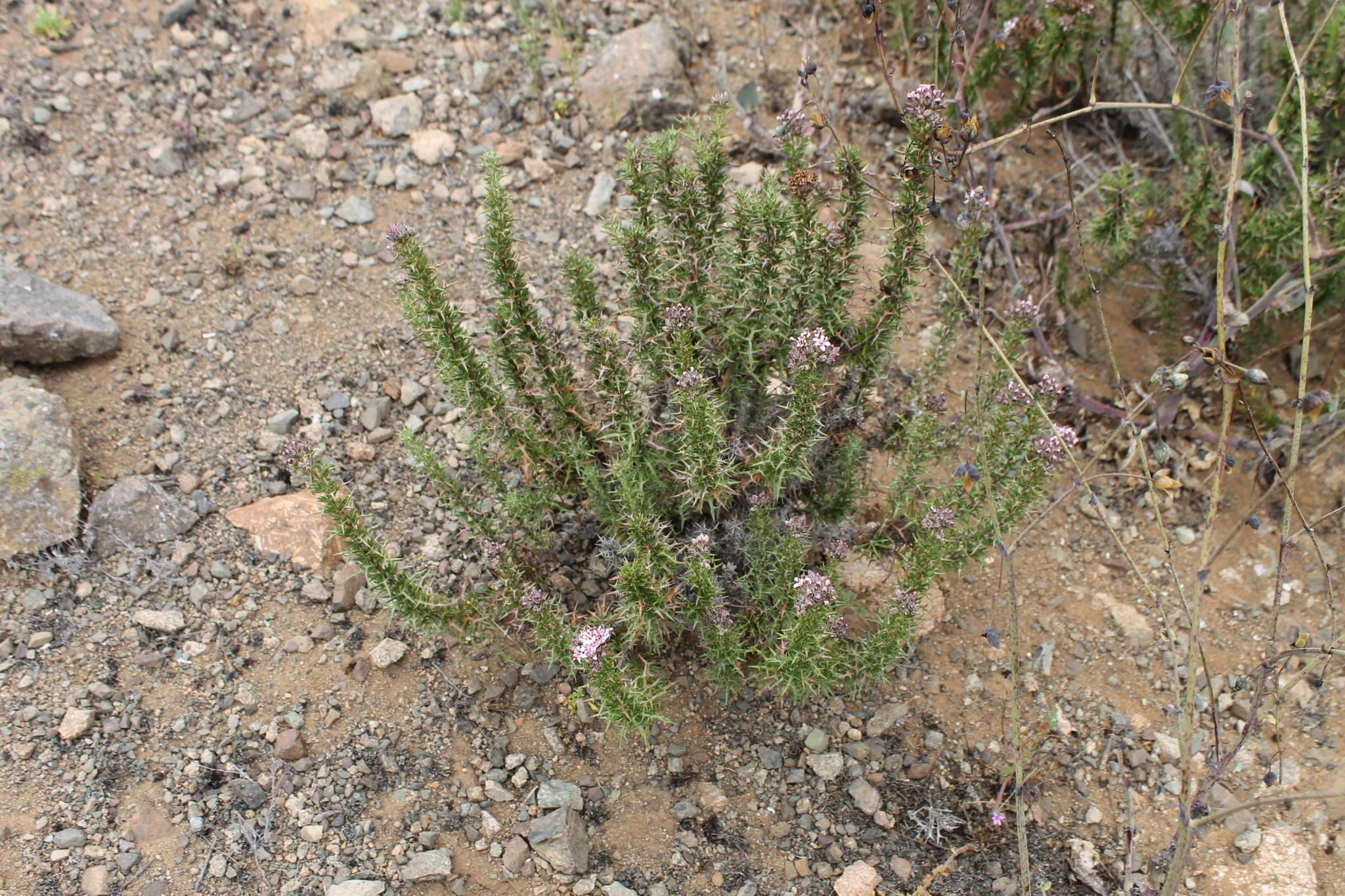
- Oxyphyllum ulicinum

Scientific classification
- Kingdom: Plantae
- Clade: Tracheophytes
- Clade: Angiosperms
- Clade: Eudicots
- Clade: Asterids
- Order: Asterales
- Family: Asteraceae
- Subfamily: Mutisioideae
- Tribe: Nassauvieae
- Genus: Oxyphyllum; Phil.
- Species: O. ulicinum

Binomial name
- Oxyphyllum ulicinum Phil.

= Oxyphyllum =

Species of plant

Oxyphyllum is a genus of South American flowering plants in the family Asteraceae.

Species

The only known species is Oxyphyllum ulicinum, native to northern Chile.
