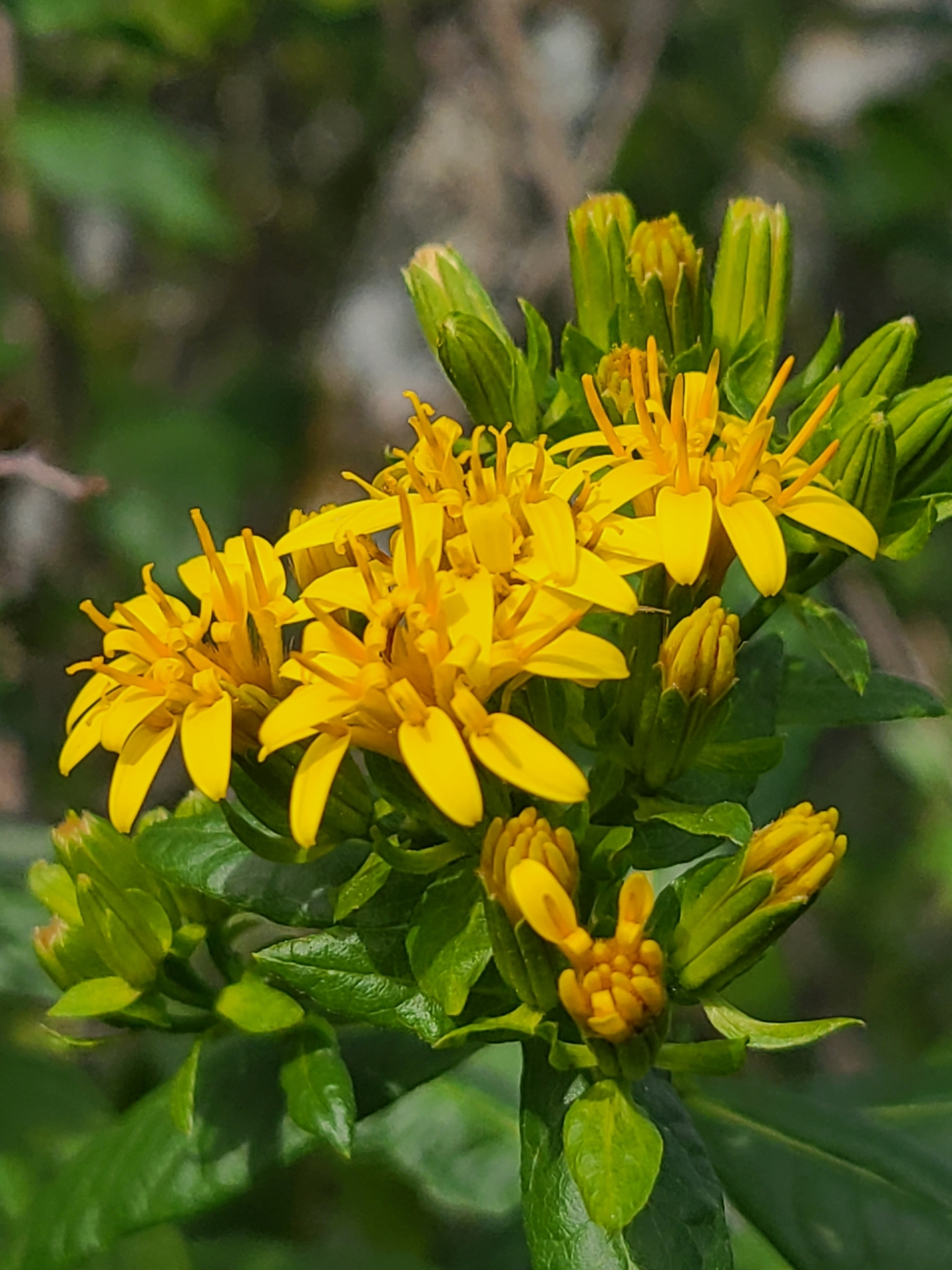

Scientific classification
- Kingdom: Plantae
- Clade: Embryophytes
- Clade: Tracheophytes
- Clade: Spermatophytes
- Clade: Angiosperms
- Clade: Eudicots
- Clade: Asterids
- Order: Asterales
- Family: Asteraceae
- Genus: Trixis
- Species: T. inula

Binomial name
- Trixis inula Crantz

Synonyms
- Inula trixis L.; Perdicium corymbosum Sessé & Moc. ex D.Don [Illegitimate]; Perdicium havanense Kunth; Perdicium laevigatum Berg; Perdicium radiale L. [Illegitimate]; Prenanthes fruticosa Willd. ex Less.; Solidago fruticosa Mill.; Tenorea berteroi Colla [Illegitimate]; Tenorea calyculata Bertero ex Colla; Trixis adenolepis S.F.Blake; Trixis chiantlensis S.F.Blake; Trixis corymbosa D.Don; Trixis deamii B.L.Rob.; Trixis ehrenbergii Kunze; Trixis frutescens P.Browne ex Spreng.; Trixis frutescens P.Browne; Trixis frutescens var. angustifolia DC.; Trixis frutescens var. glabrata Less.; Trixis frutescens var. latifolia Less.; Trixis frutescens var. obtusifolia Less.; Trixis glabra D.Don; Trixis havanensis (Kunth) Spreng.; Trixis laevigata Lag.; Trixis mexicana Moc. ex Less. [Illegitimate]; Trixis radialis (L.) Lag. [Illegitimate]; Trixis radialis (L.) Kuntze [Illegitimate]; Trixis radialis var. pubescens Kuntze; Trixis radialis var. subglabra Kuntze

= Trixis inula =

Species of flowering plant

Trixis inula, the tropical threefold, is a plant species native to Texas, Mexico, Central America, northern South America, and the West Indies. It is found on open, sandy sites such as roadsides, thorn scrub, thickets, etc.

Trixis inula is a much-branched shrub up to 300 cm (10 feet) tall. It has lanceolate to elliptic leaves up to 17 cm (7 inches) long. Yellow flower heads are borne in paniculate arrays.
