= Cephalopappus =

Scientific classification
- Kingdom: Plantae
- Clade: Embryophytes
- Clade: Tracheophytes
- Clade: Angiosperms
- Clade: Eudicots
- Clade: Asterids
- Order: Asterales
- Family: Asteraceae
- Subfamily: Mutisioideae
- Tribe: Nassauvieae
- Genus: Cephalopappus; C.G.D.Nees & C.F.P.Martius
- Species: C. sonchifolius

Binomial name
- Cephalopappus sonchifolius C.G.D.Nees & C.F.P.Martius

Synonyms
- Sparganophorus sonchifolius (Nees & Mart.) Spreng.

Genus of flowering plants

Cephalopappus is a genus of flowering plants in the family Asteraceae.

There is only one known species, Cephalopappus sonchifolius, native to eastern Brazil (States of Bahia and Rio de Janeiro).
