= N. darwini =

N. darwini may refer to:

- Neobrachypterus darwini
- Nervellius darwini
- Nesoryzomys darwini, the Darwin's nesoryzomys, Darwin's rice rat or Darwin's Galápagos mouse, a rodent species
- Nettastomella darwini, a bivalve mollusc species in the genus Nettastomella and the family Pholadidae
- Nocticanace darwini

== See also ==
- N. darwinii (disambiguation)
- Darwini (disambiguation)
