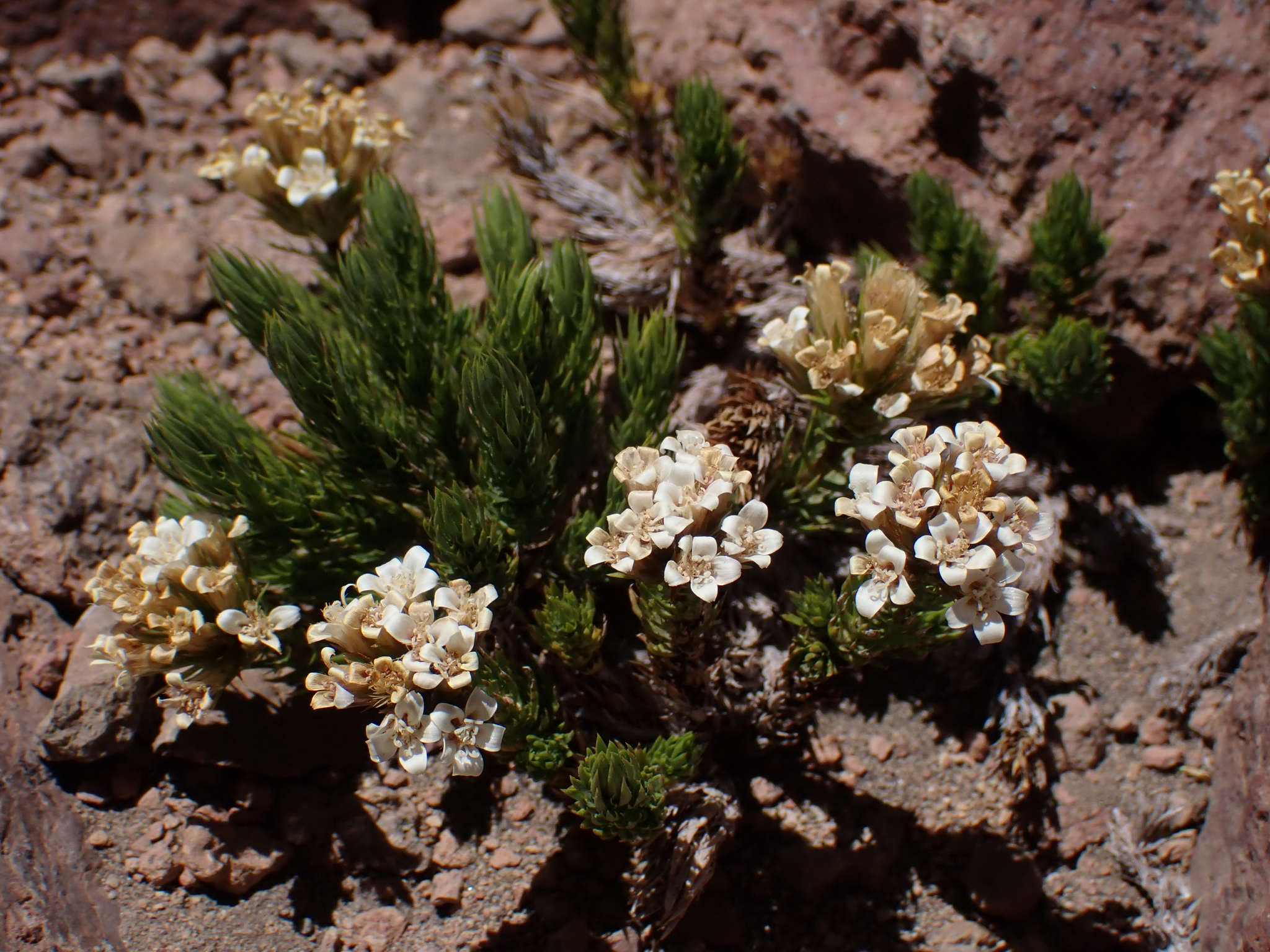

Scientific classification
- Kingdom: Plantae
- Clade: Tracheophytes
- Clade: Angiosperms
- Clade: Eudicots
- Clade: Asterids
- Order: Asterales
- Family: Asteraceae
- Genus: Nassauvia
- Species: N. glomerata

Binomial name
- Nassauvia glomerata Wedd.

= Nassauvia glomerata =

Species of flowering plant

Nassauvia glomerata is a species of flowering plant in the family Asteraceae. The species is native to Chile and Argentina.
