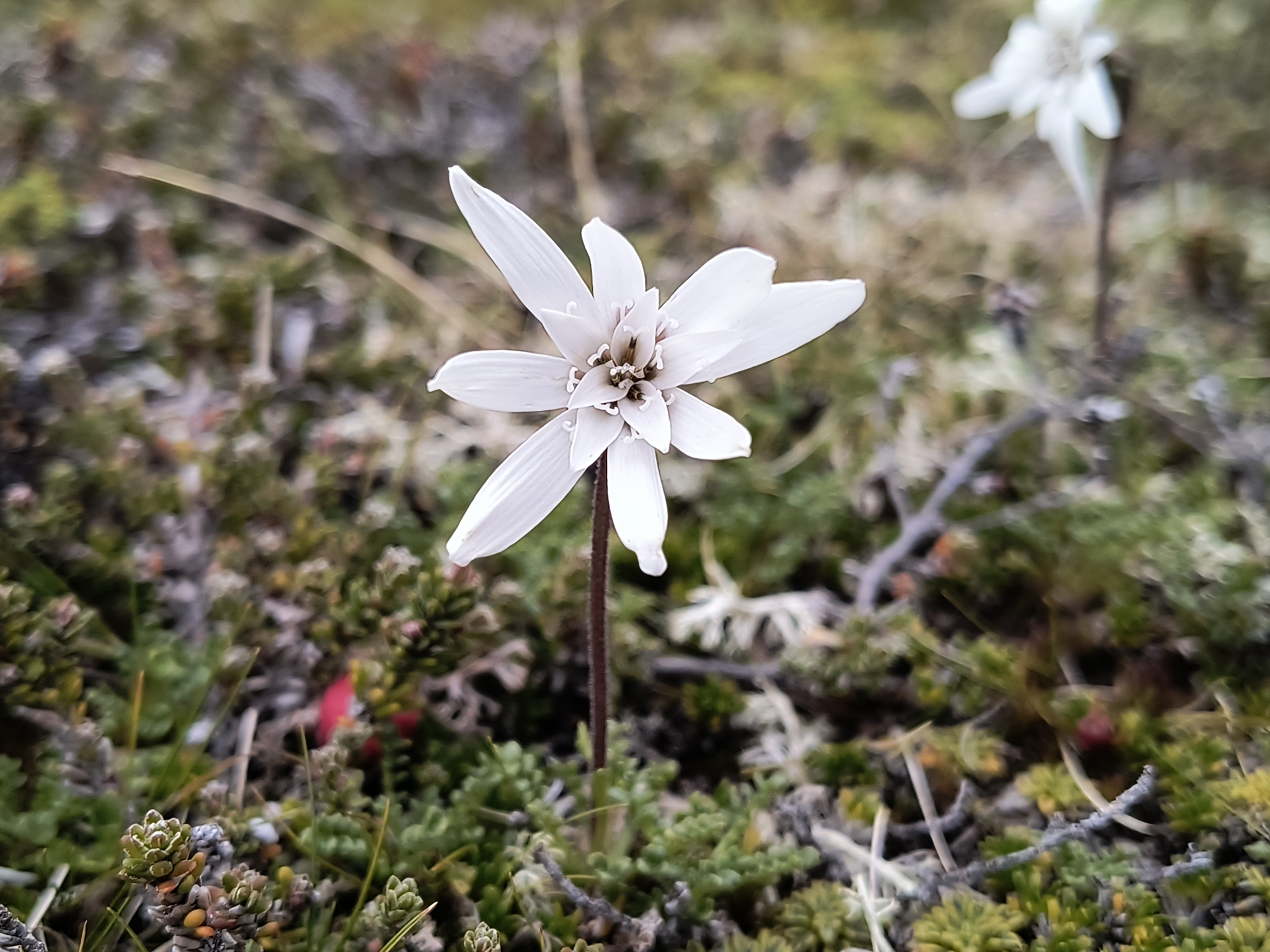

Scientific classification
- Kingdom: Plantae
- Clade: Tracheophytes
- Clade: Angiosperms
- Clade: Eudicots
- Clade: Asterids
- Order: Asterales
- Family: Asteraceae
- Genus: Perezia
- Species: P. magellanica

Binomial name
- Perezia magellanica (L.f.) Lag. (1811)

Synonyms
- Clarionea magellanica (L. f.) DC.; Clarionea elegans Phil.; Perdicium magellanicum L. f.; Perezia lagascae Cass.; Perezia magellanica (L. f.) Less.; Clarionella magellanica Decne.

= Perezia magellanica =

Species of flowering plant

Perezia magellanica is a species of flowering plants in the family Asteraceae. It is the type species of its genus. It is found in Argentina and Chile.
