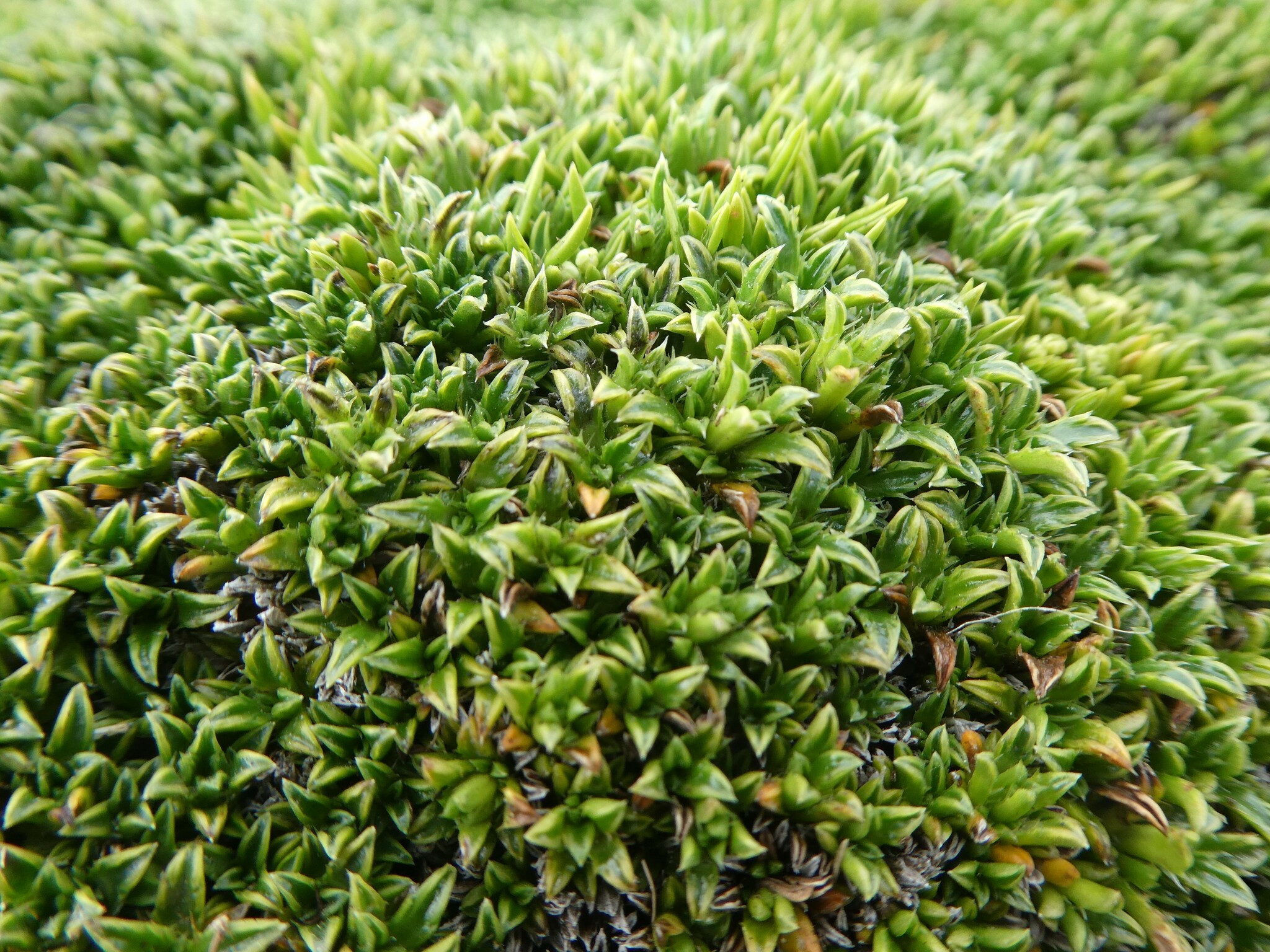

Conservation status
- Least Concern (IUCN 3.1)

Scientific classification
- Kingdom: Plantae
- Clade: Tracheophytes
- Clade: Angiosperms
- Clade: Eudicots
- Clade: Asterids
- Order: Asterales
- Family: Asteraceae
- Genus: Nassauvia
- Species: N. gaudichaudii

Binomial name
- Nassauvia gaudichaudii (Cass.) Cass. ex Gaudich.

= Nassauvia gaudichaudii =

Species of flowering plant

Nassauvia gaudichaudii, the coastal nassauvia, is a species of flowering plant in the family Asteraceae. It is found only in Falkland Islands. Its natural habitats are temperate shrubland, rocky areas, and rocky shores.
