= Berylsimpsonia =

Scientific classification
- Kingdom: Plantae
- Clade: Embryophytes
- Clade: Tracheophytes
- Clade: Angiosperms
- Clade: Eudicots
- Clade: Asterids
- Order: Asterales
- Family: Asteraceae
- Subfamily: Mutisioideae
- Tribe: Nassauvieae
- Genus: Berylsimpsonia; B.L.Turner

Type species
- Berylsimpsonia vanillosma (C.Wright) B.L.Turner

Genus of flowering plants

Proustia is a genus of shrubs in the family Asteraceae, native to the Greater Antilles.

The genus is named for Dr. Beryl Simpson, of the University of Texas.

Species

- Berylsimpsonia crassinervis (Urb.) B.L.Turner - Hispaniola
- Berylsimpsonia vanillosma (C.Wright) B.L.Turner - Cuba, Haiti, Puerto Rico
