= Marticorenia =

Scientific classification
- Kingdom: Plantae
- Clade: Tracheophytes
- Clade: Angiosperms
- Clade: Eudicots
- Clade: Asterids
- Order: Asterales
- Family: Asteraceae
- Subfamily: Mutisioideae
- Tribe: Nassauvieae
- Genus: Marticorenia; Crisci
- Species: M. foliosa

Binomial name
- Marticorenia foliosa (Phil.) Crisci

Synonyms
- Leucheria foliosa Phil.; Lasiorrhiza foliosa (Phil.) Kuntze

Species of plant

Marticorenia is a genus of flowering plants in the family Asteraceae.

There is only one known species, Marticorenia foliosa, endemic to Chile.
