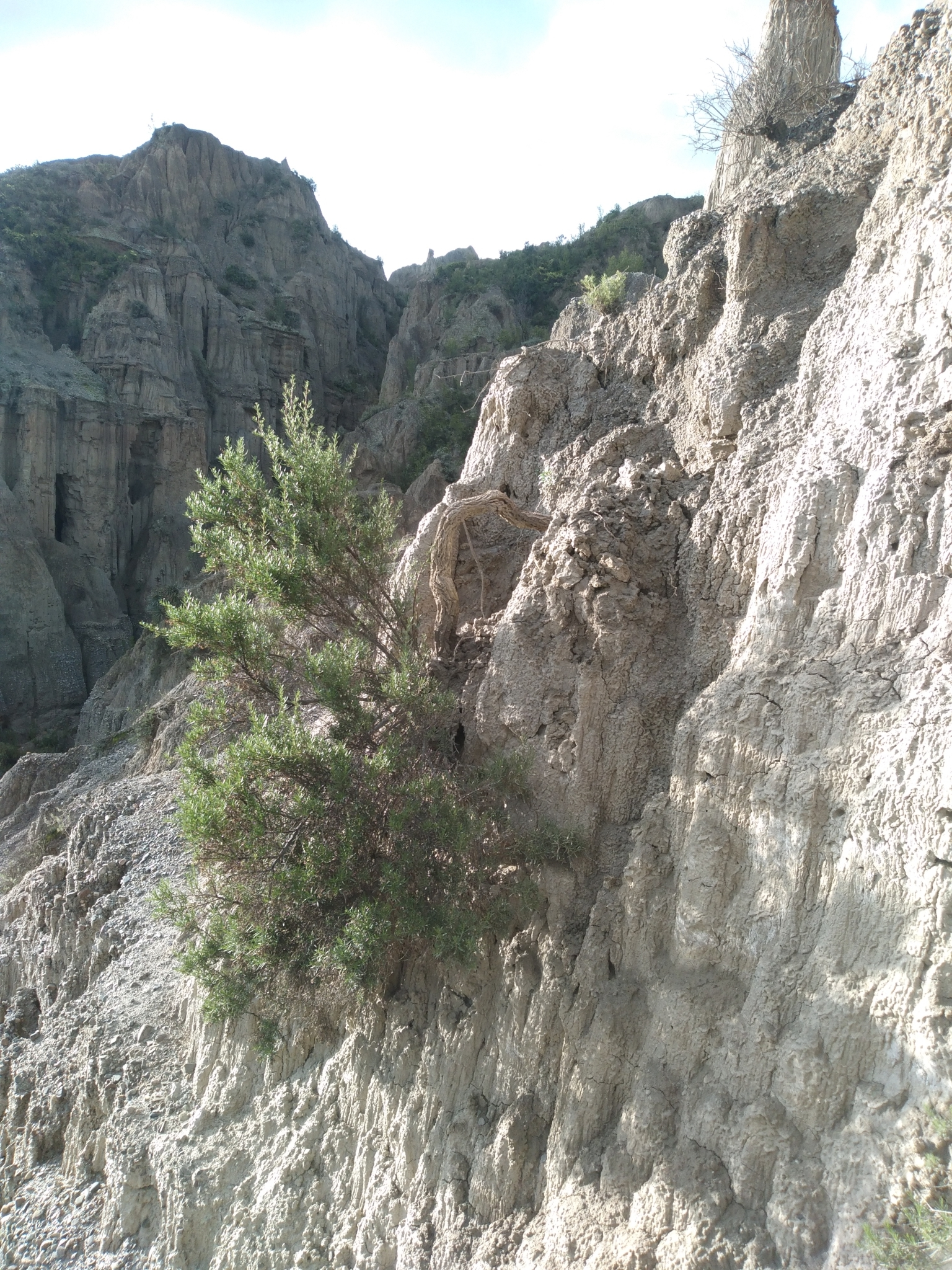
- Lophopappus foliosus in Bolivia

Scientific classification
- Kingdom: Plantae
- Clade: Tracheophytes
- Clade: Angiosperms
- Clade: Eudicots
- Clade: Asterids
- Order: Asterales
- Family: Asteraceae
- Subfamily: Mutisioideae
- Tribe: Nassauvieae
- Genus: Lophopappus; H.H.Rusby

Type species
- Lophopappus foliosus H.H.Rusby

= Lophopappus =

Genus of flowering plants

Lophopappus is a genus of South American flowering plants in the family Asteraceae.

Species

- Lophopappus blakei Cabrera - Peru
- Lophopappus cuneatus R.E.Fr. - Bolivia, Jujuy Province in Argentina
- Lophopappus foliosus Rusby - Bolivia, Peru, Jujuy Province in Argentina, Tarapacá Region in Chile
- Lophopappus tarapacanus (Phil.) Cabrera - Tarapacá Region in Chile
