= Calopappus =

Scientific classification
- Kingdom: Plantae
- Clade: Tracheophytes
- Clade: Angiosperms
- Clade: Eudicots
- Clade: Asterids
- Order: Asterales
- Family: Asteraceae
- Subfamily: Mutisioideae
- Tribe: Nassauvieae
- Genus: Calopappus; Meyen
- Species: C. acerosus

Binomial name
- Calopappus acerosus Meyen

Synonyms
- Calopappus acanthifolius Nassauvia acerosa

Species of plant

Calopappus is a monotypic genus of flowering plants in the family Asteraceae, containing the single species Calopappus acerosus. It is endemic to central Chile, where it occurs in the Andes.
