= Dolichlasium =

Scientific classification
- Kingdom: Plantae
- Clade: Embryophytes
- Clade: Tracheophytes
- Clade: Angiosperms
- Clade: Eudicots
- Clade: Asterids
- Order: Asterales
- Family: Asteraceae
- Subfamily: Mutisioideae
- Tribe: Nassauvieae
- Genus: Dolichlasium; Lag.
- Species: D. lagascae

Binomial name
- Dolichlasium lagascae Gillies ex D.Don

Synonyms
- Dolichlasium glanduliferum Lag. ex Hook. & Arn.; Trixis glandulifera Benth. & Hook.f. ex Hieron.

Genus of flowering plants

Dolichlasium is a genus of flowering plants in the family Asteraceae.

There is only one known species, Dolichlasium lagascae, endemic to Argentina.
