= Holocheilus =

- Holocheilus hieracioides

Scientific classification
- Kingdom: Plantae
- Clade: Tracheophytes
- Clade: Angiosperms
- Clade: Eudicots
- Clade: Asterids
- Order: Asterales
- Family: Asteraceae
- Subfamily: Mutisioideae
- Tribe: Nassauvieae
- Genus: Holocheilus; Cass.

Type species
- Holocheilus ochroleucus (syn of H. brasiliensis) Cass.

Synonyms
- Trixis sect. Cleanthes (D.Don) DC.; Perezia subg. Platycheilus (Cass.) Less.; Platycheilus Cass.; Perezia sect. Platycheilus (Cass.) Less.; Trixis subg. Cleanthes (D.Don) Less.

Genus of flowering plants

Holocheilus is a genus of flowering plants in the family Asteraceae.

Species

- Holocheilus brasiliensis (L.) Cabrera - Brazil, Argentina, Paraguay, Uruguay
- Holocheilus fabrisii Cabrera - Bolivia, southern Brazil, northwestern Argentina
- Holocheilus hieracioides (D.Don) Cabrera - Brazil, Argentina, Paraguay, Uruguay
- Holocheilus illustris (Vell.) Cabrera - Brazil, Argentina, Uruguay
- Holocheilus monocephalus Mondin - Brazil (Rio Grande do Sul, Santa Catarina)
- Holocheilus pinnatifidus (Less.) Cabrera - Brazil (Paraná, São Paulo)
- Holocheilus schulzii (Cabrera) Cabrera - Brazil (Paraná), Argentina, Paraguay
