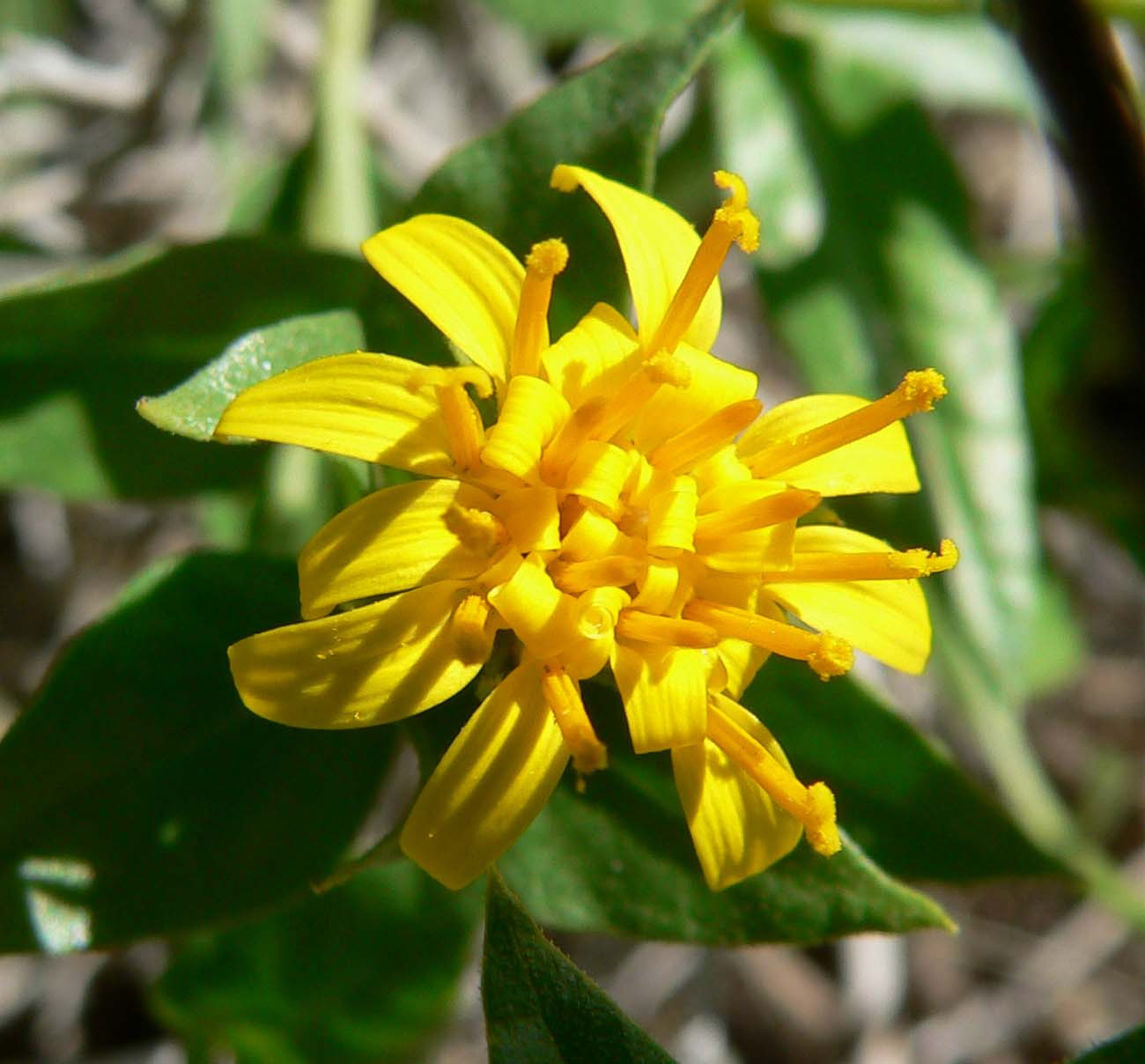
- In Palm Canyon, California

Conservation status
- Secure (NatureServe)

Scientific classification
- Kingdom: Plantae
- Clade: Tracheophytes
- Clade: Angiosperms
- Clade: Eudicots
- Clade: Asterids
- Order: Asterales
- Family: Asteraceae
- Genus: Trixis
- Species: T. californica

Binomial name
- Trixis californica Kellogg

= Trixis californica =

Species of flowering plant

Trixis californica, the American threefold or American trixis, is a species of flowering plant in the family Asteraceae. It is native to North America.

== Description ==
Trixis californica is a sprawling shrub or subshrub growing up to 90 centimetres (35 in) tall. The leaves are lance-shaped (lanceolate), dark green, 2–5 cm long, and 0.5–3 cm wide. The inflorescence is terminal, usually a panicle or corymb, but sometimes the heads are borne singly at the tips of branches. The flower heads are 2 cm across and have about 15 bright yellow flowers each.

== Distribution and habitat ==
It is native to the southwestern United States in California, Arizona, New Mexico, and Texas, and in northern Mexico in the states of Baja California, Chihuahua, Coahuila, Durango, Nuevo León, Sinaloa, Sonora, Tamaulipas, and Zacatecas.

This species occurs from sea level to 1,500 metres (5,000 ft) in elevation. Its habitat types include rocky hillsides, thorn scrub, and desert washes and brush. In the western Sonoran Desert it is exclusive to washes and only grows amongst other plants. In the Colorado Desert it grows in creosote scrub. It grows in scrub in the Yuma Desert, east of the Colorado River. Though it usually flowers between February and October, it may bloom nearly year-round depending on winter weather conditions.

== Uses ==
The leaves of this species were smoked for pleasure by the Seri of Mexico. Other uses include administration as an aid to childbirth.

== Images ==
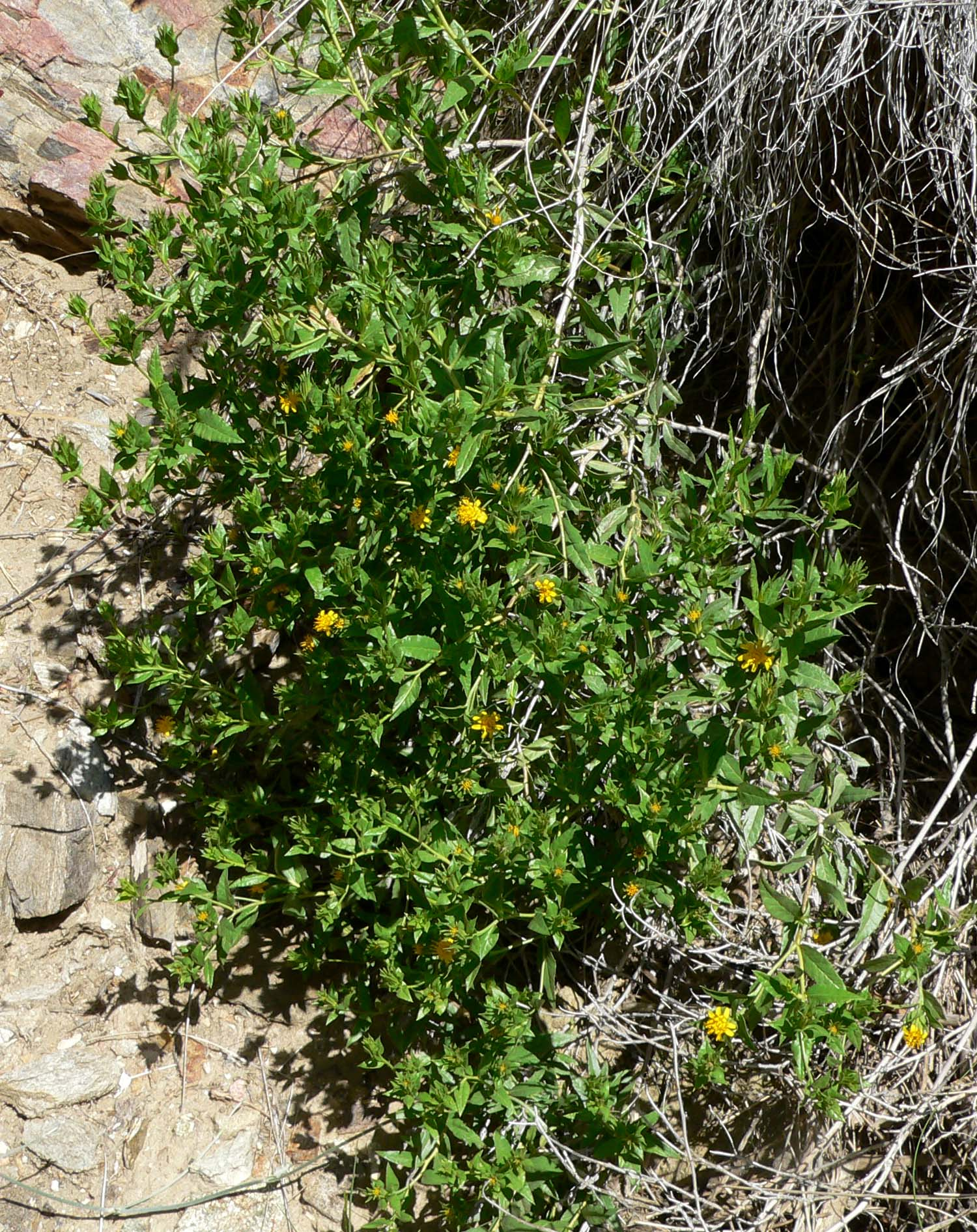
Form

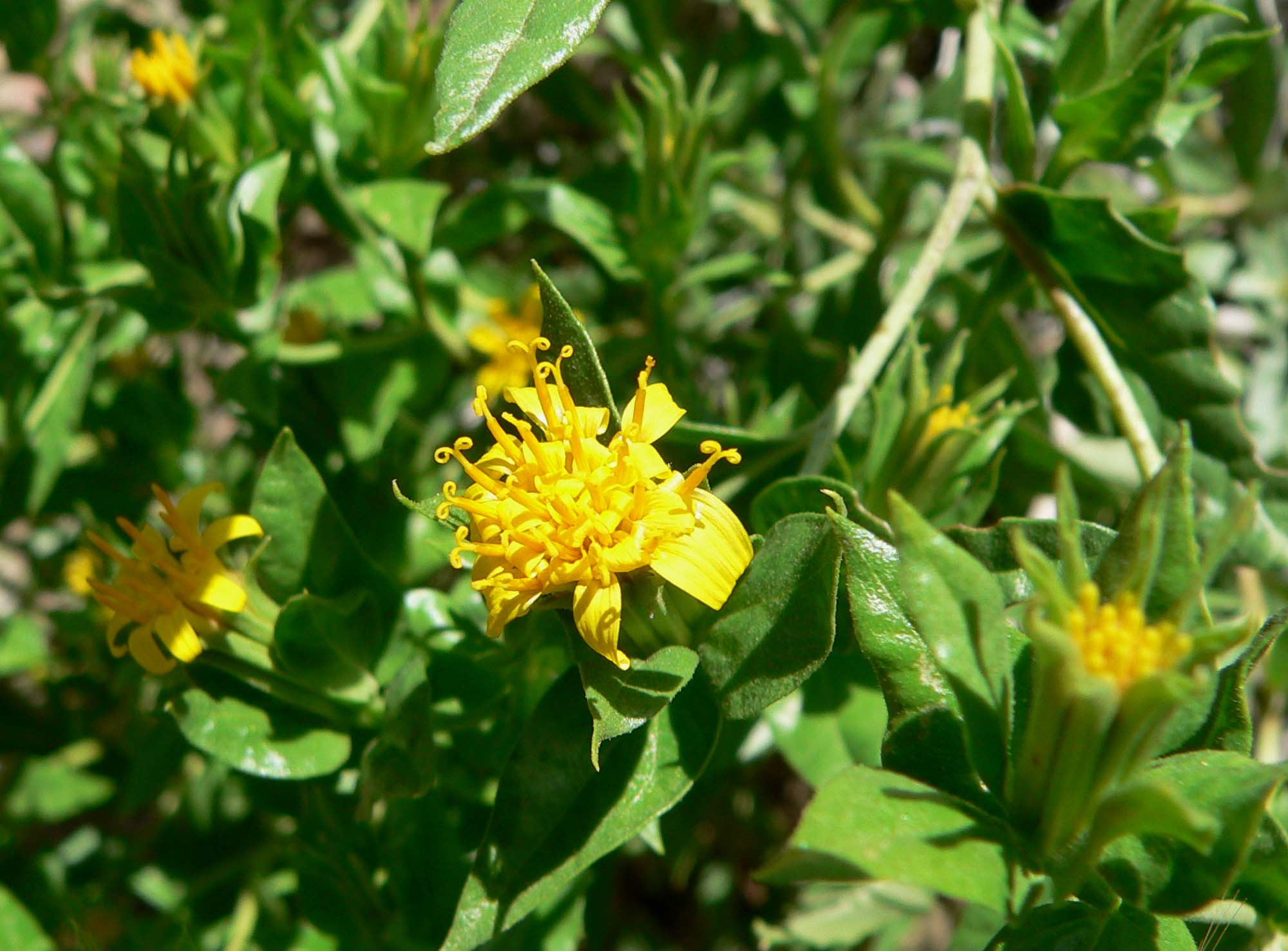
In flower

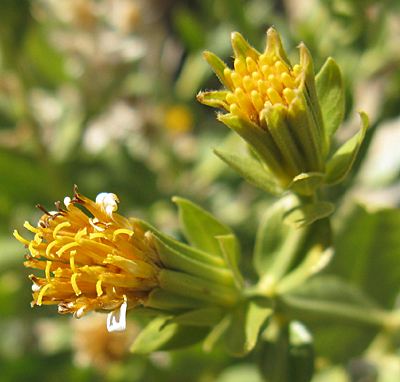
Flower heads (var. californica)
