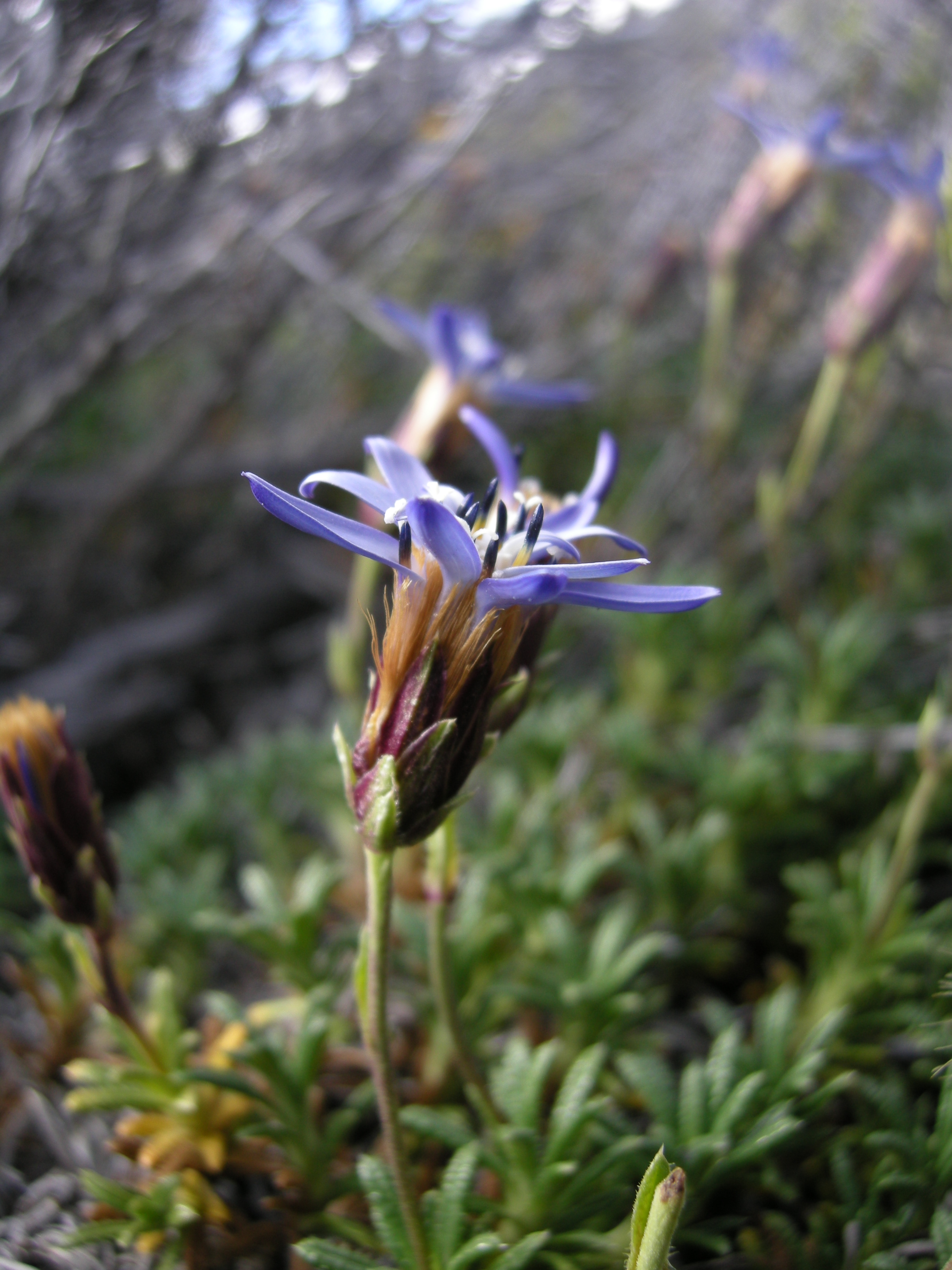
- Perezia recurvata

Scientific classification
- Kingdom: Plantae
- Clade: Tracheophytes
- Clade: Angiosperms
- Clade: Eudicots
- Clade: Asterids
- Order: Asterales
- Family: Asteraceae
- Subfamily: Mutisioideae
- Tribe: Nassauvieae
- Genus: Perezia; Lag.

Type species
- Perezia magellanica (L.f.) Lag.

Species
- About 30-35

= Perezia (plant) =

Genus of flowering plants

Perezia is a genus of flowering plants in the family Asteraceae. It is distributed in South America, especially in the central and southern Andes.

Though some species occur at sea level, most Perezia grow in high-elevation mountain habitat. Species are found in most high Andean ecosystems, except for the páramo.

Some species are used in traditional medicine in South America. P. multiflora is used to treat postpartum hemorrhage, P. pinnatifida is used as a sedative, and P. purpurata is used as an anti-inflammatory.

There are about 30 to 35 species in the genus.

Species include:

- Perezia atacamensis
- Perezia bellidifolia
- Perezia calophylla
- Perezia carduncelloides
- Perezia carthamoides
- Perezia catharinensis
- Perezia ciliaris
- Perezia ciliosa
- Perezia delicata
- Perezia dicephala
- Perezia eryngioides
- Perezia fonkii
- Perezia fosbergii
- Perezia kingii
- Perezia lactucoides
- Perezia linearis
- Perezia lyrata
- Perezia macrocephala
- Perezia magellanica
- Perezia mandoni
- Perezia megalantha
- Perezia multiflora – escorzonera, chanqoroma
- Perezia nutans
- Perezia pedicularidifolia
- Perezia pilifera
- Perezia pinnatifida – valeriana
- Perezia poeppigii
- Perezia prenanthoides
- Perezia pungens
- Perezia purpurata – marancel
- Perezia pygmaea
- Perezia recurvata
- Perezia spathulata
- Perezia squarrosa
- Perezia sublyrata
- Perezia virens
- Perezia volcanensis
