= Pachylaena =

Scientific classification
- Kingdom: Plantae
- Clade: Tracheophytes
- Clade: Angiosperms
- Clade: Eudicots
- Clade: Asterids
- Order: Asterales
- Family: Asteraceae
- Subfamily: Mutisioideae
- Tribe: Mutisieae
- Genus: Pachylaena; D.Don & Arn. ex Hook.

Type species
- Pachylaena atriplicifolia D.Don & Arn. ex Hook.

Synonyms
- Chionoptera DC.

Genus of flowering plants

Pachylaena is a genus of South American flowering plants in the tribe Mutisieae within the family Asteraceae.

Species

- Pachylaena atriplicifolia D.Don ex Hook. & Arn. - Chile, Argentina
- Pachylaena rosea I.M.Johnst. - Chile

formerly included

see Chaetanthera

- Pachylaena elegans Phil. - Chaetanthera flabellifolia Cabrera
