= Elsa Matilde Zardini =

Argentine botanist

- Died: Villa Elisa
- Occupation: Botanical collector, scientific collector
- Spouse(s): Raúl Zardini
- Awards: Guggenheim Fellowship

Elsa Matilde Zardini (1949–2020) was an Argentine-Paraguayan botanist, teacher, curator, and explorer. She made botanical expeditions in the US, Brazil, Argentina and Paraguay. Three botanical taxon names were authored by Zardini. Her specialization was the flora of the Plata basin, with an emphasis on that of Paraguay.

== Early life and education ==
In 1973 Zardini earned a master's degree in Science, and in 1974 a PhD, both at the National University of La Plata in Buenos Aires, Argentina.

== Career ==
Zardini was one of the disciples of the Argentine botanist Ángel Lulio Cabrera among them: Genoveva Dawson, Otto Solbrig, Jorge Morello, Humberto A. Fabris (1924–1976), Delia Abbiatti, Noemí Correa, Delia Añón Suárez, Cristina Orsi, Amelia Torres, Aída Pontiroli, Jorge Crisci, Roberto Kiesling and Fernando Zuloaga. In 2011 she became associate curator of the Missouri Botanical Garden. Spermatophytes was an area of interest for her.

She died in 2020.

=== Publications ===
Flora of the Guianas Onagraceae. Zardini, Elsa M., J. Jansen-Jacobs, Peter H. Raven. 1991.e. Vol. 10. Ed. Koeltz

American Cucurbitaceae useful to man: Whitaker, Thomas of the United States Department of Agriculture, Zardini, E.M. La Plata, October 7 to 14, 1980. Ed. Province of Buenos Aires Commission of Investigations Scientists,

The standard author abbreviation Zardini is used to indicate this person as the author when citing a botanical name.

=== Plants named by Zardini ===
Zardini named the plant taxa Lulia, Lulia nervosa, and Trichocline deserticola.
