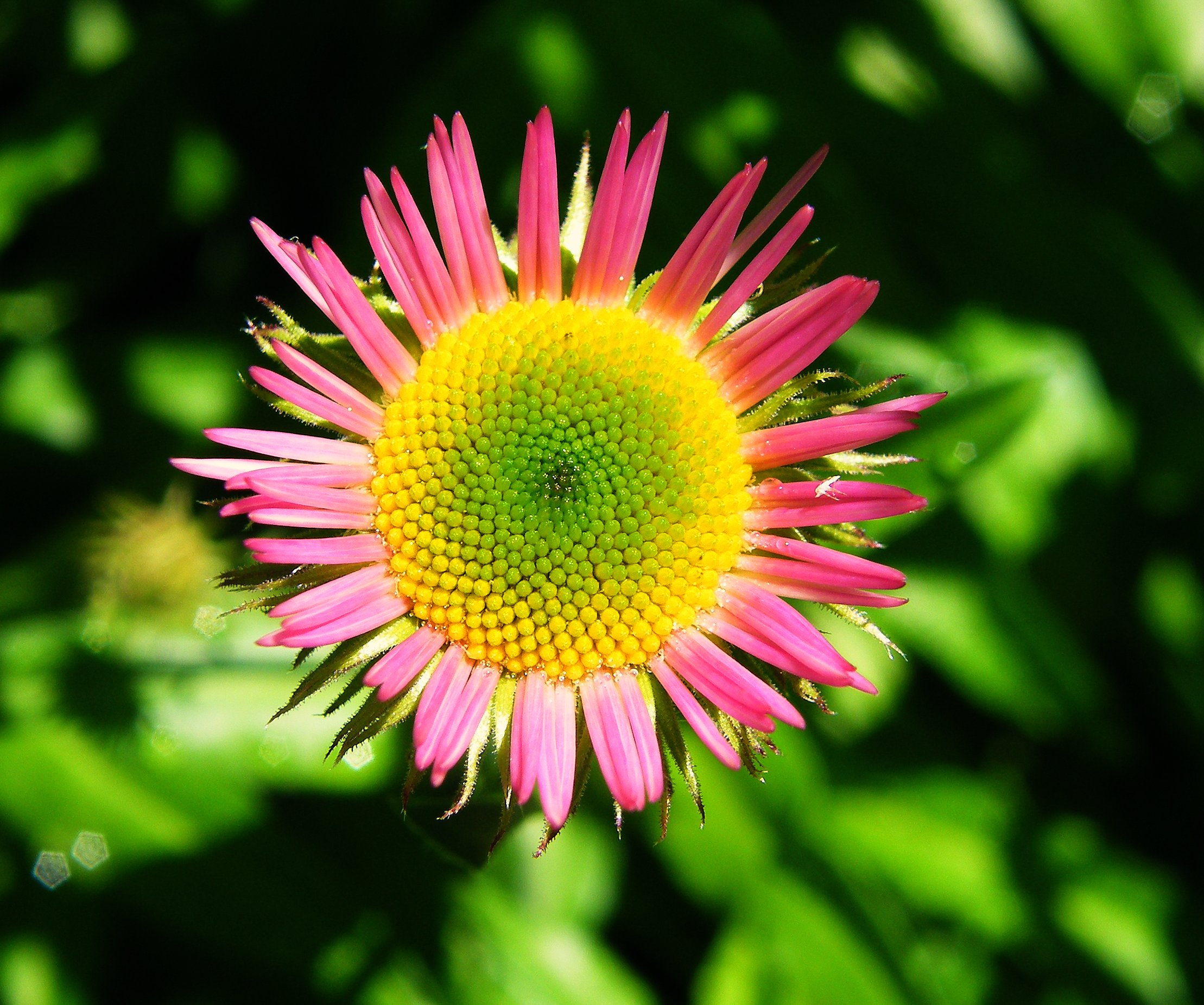
- Oreostemma alpigenum

Scientific classification
- Kingdom: Plantae
- Clade: Embryophytes
- Clade: Tracheophytes
- Clade: Angiosperms
- Clade: Eudicots
- Clade: Asterids
- Order: Asterales
- Family: Asteraceae
- Subfamily: Asteroideae
- Tribe: Astereae
- Subtribe: Machaerantherinae
- Genus: Oreostemma; Greene

Synonyms
- Oreastrum Greene 1896, illegitimate near-homonym, not Oriastrum Poepp. 1843; Aster subg. Oreostemma (Greene) Peck

= Oreostemma =

Genus of flowering plants

Oreostemma is a genus of flowering plants in the family Asteraceae. Species are found in western North America, with two endemic to California.

Species

- Oreostemma alpigenum (Tundra aster) – California, Nevada, Oregon, Washington, Idaho, Montana, Wyoming
- Oreostemma elatum (Plumas alpine aster) – Sierra Nevada, California
- Oreostemma peirsonii (Peirson's aster) – endemic to California, in the southern Sierra Nevada.
