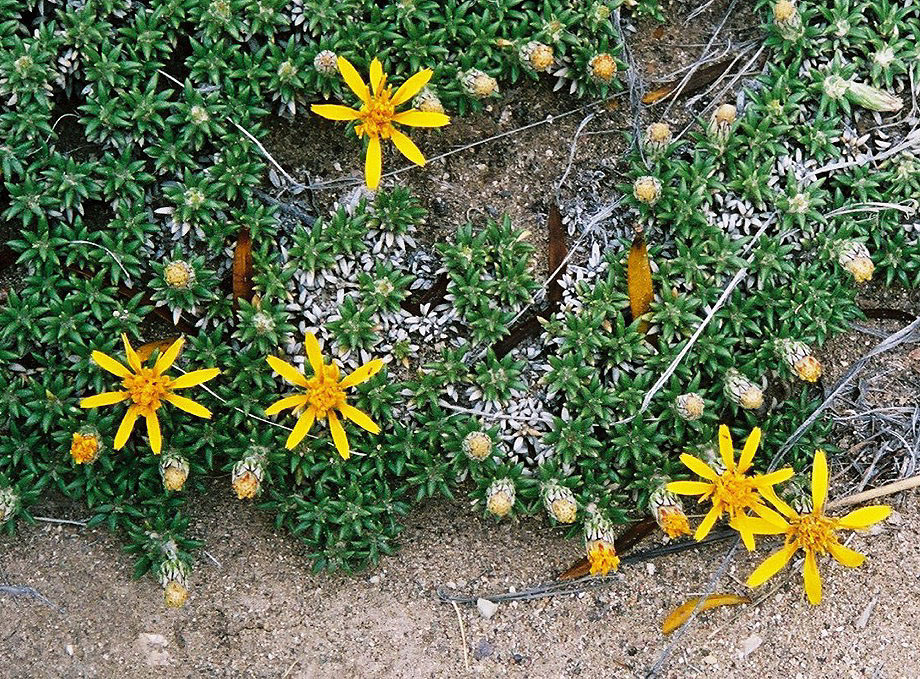

Scientific classification
- Kingdom: Plantae
- Clade: Embryophytes
- Clade: Tracheophytes
- Clade: Angiosperms
- Clade: Eudicots
- Clade: Asterids
- Order: Asterales
- Family: Asteraceae
- Subfamily: Mutisioideae
- Tribe: Mutisieae
- Genus: Brachyclados; D.Don

Type species
- Brachyclados lycioides D.Don

Synonyms
- Baucis Phil.

= Brachyclados =

Genus of flowering plants

Brachyclados is a small genus of South American plants in the tribe Mutisieae tribe within the family Asteraceae.

Species

- Brachyclados caespitosus (Phil.) Speg. - southern Argentina (Chubut + Santa Cruz)
- Brachyclados lycioides D.Don - Chile (Coquimbo), Argentina (Chubut, Rio Negro, La Pampa, Buenos Aires, Mendoza, Neuquén, San Luis)
- Brachyclados megalanthus Speg. - Argentina (Chubut, Rio Negro, La Pampa, Buenos Aires)

formerly included

see Trichocline

- Brachyclados stuckertii - Trichocline plicata
