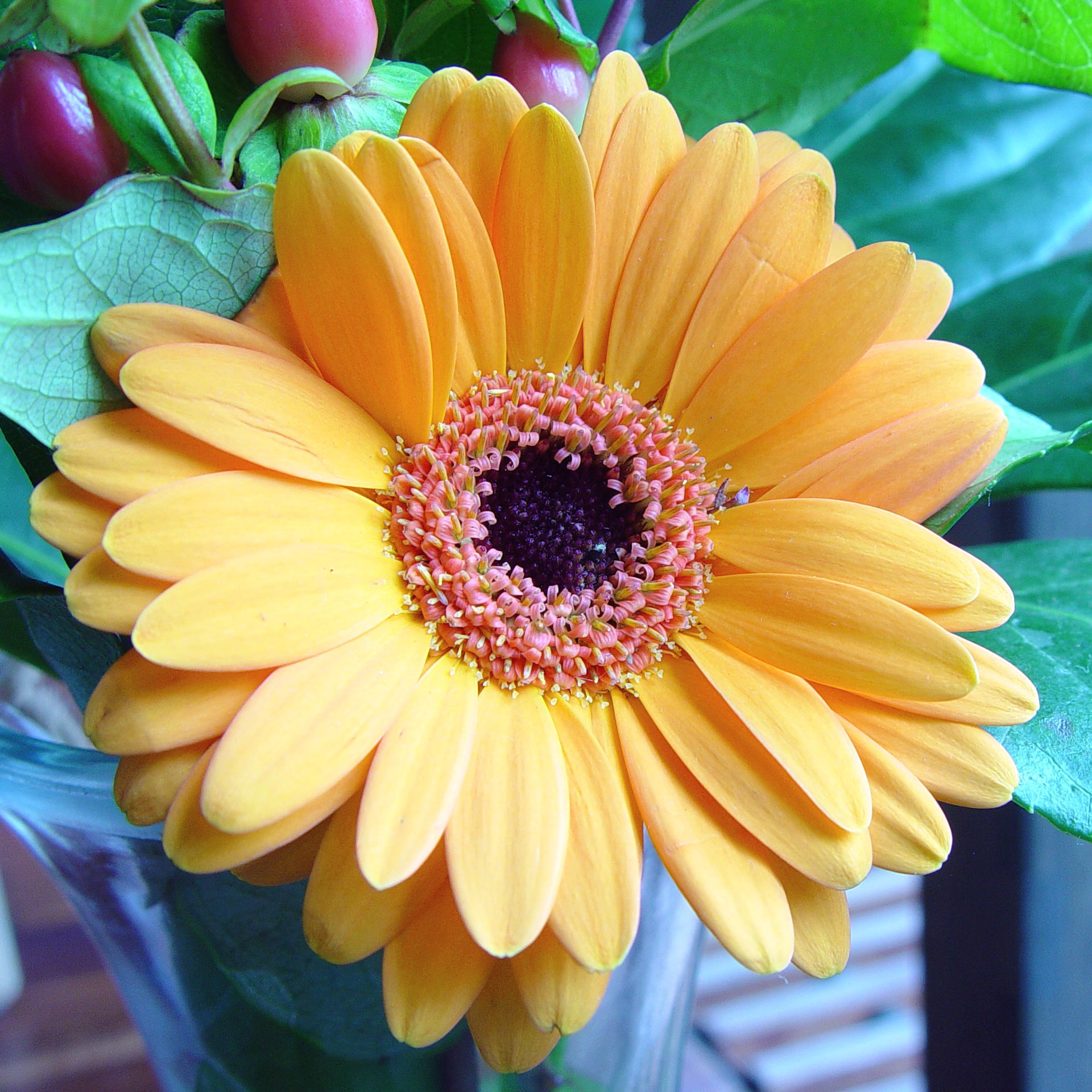
- Gerbera

Scientific classification
- Kingdom: Plantae
- Clade: Tracheophytes
- Clade: Angiosperms
- Clade: Eudicots
- Clade: Asterids
- Order: Asterales
- Family: Asteraceae
- Subfamily: Mutisioideae
- Tribe: Mutisieae; Cass.

= Mutisieae =

Tribe of flowering plants

Mutisieae is a tribe of the family Asteraceae, subfamily Mutisioideae.

== Genera ==
Mutisieae genera recognized by the Global Compositae Database as of June 2022:

- Adenocaulon Hook.
- Amblysperma Benth.
- Brachyclados D.Don
- Chaetanthera Ruiz & Pav.
- Chaptalia Vent.
- Chucoa Cabrera
- Cyclolepis Gillies ex D.Don
- Eriachaenium Sch.Bip.
- Gerbera L.
- Leibnitzia Cass.
- Lulia Zardini
- Moscharia Ruiz & Pav.
- Mutisia L.f.
- Oriastrum Poepp.
- Pachylaena D.Don ex Hook. & Arn.
- Panphalea Lag.
- Perdicium L.
- Trichocline Cass.
- Uechtritzia Freyn
