= Genoveva Dawson =

Argentine botanist (1918–2012)

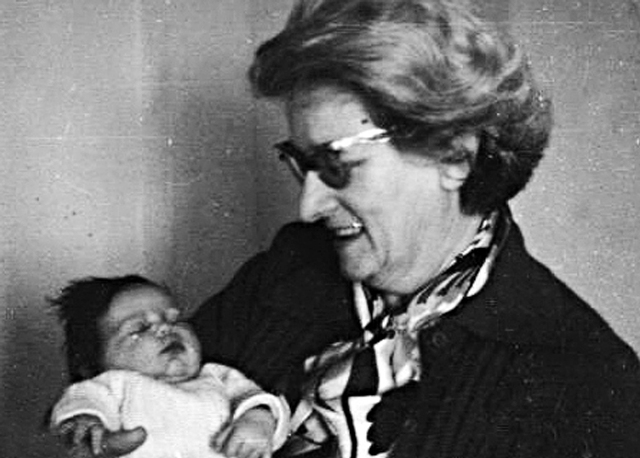
- Genoveva Dawson with granddaughter, Clara Anahí Mariani (1976)
- Born: January 23, 1918
- Died: August 21, 2012 (aged 94)
- Scientific career
- Fields: Botany

Genoveva Dawson (January 23, 1918 – August 21, 2012) was an Argentine botanist, curator, teacher, and explorer.

== Biography ==
Genoveva (Geneviève) "Kewpie" Dawson de Teruggi was born on January 23, 1918. She graduated in Botany in 1942, being one of the first graduates of that discipline at the La Plata Museum, and later she received a doctorate in Biological Sciences.

She developed her academic activities at the Facultad de Ciencias Naturales y Museo, National University of La Plata. She made botanical expeditions through Chile, and Argentina, with the help of Helga Schwabe. Dawson is part of a group of talented disciples of the botanist Ángel Lulio Cabrera, among them: María Cristina Orsi, Otto Thomas Solbrig, Elsa Matilde Zardini, Jorge Morello, Humberto A. Fabris, Delia Abbiatti, Maevia Noemí Correa, Delia Añón Suárez, Amelia Torres, Aída Pontiroli, Jorge Crisci, Roberto Kiesling and Fernando Zuloaga.

In 1972 she represented La Plata Museum at Santiago Round Table.

Dawson is the daughter of the astronomer Bernhard Dawson and the wife of the geologist Mario E. Teruggi. Dawson had four children. Of these, Diana Teruggi de Mariani (December 3, 1950, La Plata - November 24, 1976) was executed by military forces, and Diana's baby, Clara Anahí Mariani (born August 12, 1976, La Plata), was kidnapped and deprived of her identity.

She was a member of the Argentine Federation of University Women (FAMU) and the Argentine Botanical Society.

== Awards and honours ==
- November 7, 2003: on the occasion of the 40th anniversary of the creation of the "Applied Botanical Chair", the Faculty of Natural Sciences and Museum organized an Academic Act in Tribute to Dr. Genoveva Dawson de Teruggi, a pioneer in these studies
- 2005: "Outstanding Woman from La Plata", by Municipal Ordinance of La Plata

== Selected publications ==
- Genevieve Dawson. 1960. El género Utricularia en Argentina. Sociedad Argentina de Botánica 4: 139
- Genevieve Dawson. 1947. Voto sobre un ácido antiséptico y antioxidante hallado en la jarilla. Ciencia e Investigación, 3 (2) : 72-73
- Genevieve Dawson. 1946. Un Método de Diafanización para el estudio de la distribución del sistema vascular en órganos florales.

=== Books and chapters ===
- Genevieve Dawson, omár Antonio Gancedo. 1980. La palma pindó (syargrus rorrianzoffianum sic) y su importancia entre los indios guayaqui. Museo de La Plata. 15 p.
- Genevieve Dawson. 1978. Frutillas, frambuesas, moras, grosellas y arándanos: pequeña guía sistemática y nomenclador plurilingüe de todas las pequeñas bayas llamadas "berries" en inglés. Ed. Facultad de Ciencias Naturales y Museo. 36 p.
- Genevieve Dawson. 1973. Flora argentina: Lentibulariaceae. Nº 70 de Revista del Museo de La Plata: Botánica. Ed. Facultad de Ciencias Naturales y Museo. 59 p.
- Genevieve Dawson. 1968. Las tribus y géneros de Escrofulariáceas representados en Austro-América y su distribución geográfica. Nº 59 de Revista del Museo de La Plata: Botánica. Ed. Facultad de Ciencias Naturales y Museo. 128 p.
- Genevieve Dawson. 1965. Las Plantas Carnívoras. Colección Libros del Caminante, EUDEBA. 91 p. ilus.
- Angel l. Cabrera, maevia n. Correa, genevieve Dawson. 1965. Oxalidáceas a Umbelíferas, v. 4 de Colección científica del INTA. 418 p.
- Genevieve Dawson. 1961. Escrofulariaceas. Vol. 10 de Las plantas cultivadas en la República Argentina. Ed. INTA. 94 p.
- Genevieve Dawson. 1960. Los alimentos vegetales que América dio al mundo, v. 8 de Técnica y didáctica. Ed. Universidad Nacional de La Plata. 68 p.
- Genevieve Dawson. 1952. Escrofulariáceas bonaerenses: revisión de las especies que habitan en la provincia de Buenos Aires. Nº 31 de Revista del Museo de La Plata: Botánica. 62 p.
- Angel l. Cabrera, genevieve Dawson. 1944. La Selva marginal de Punta Lara: en la ribera argentina del río de La Plata. Ed. Universidad Nacional de La Plata, Instituto del Museo. 116 p.
- Genevieve Dawson. Las Santaláceas argentinas. Nº 23 de Revista del Museo de La Plata: Sección botánica. Instituto del Museo de la UNLP. 80 p.
