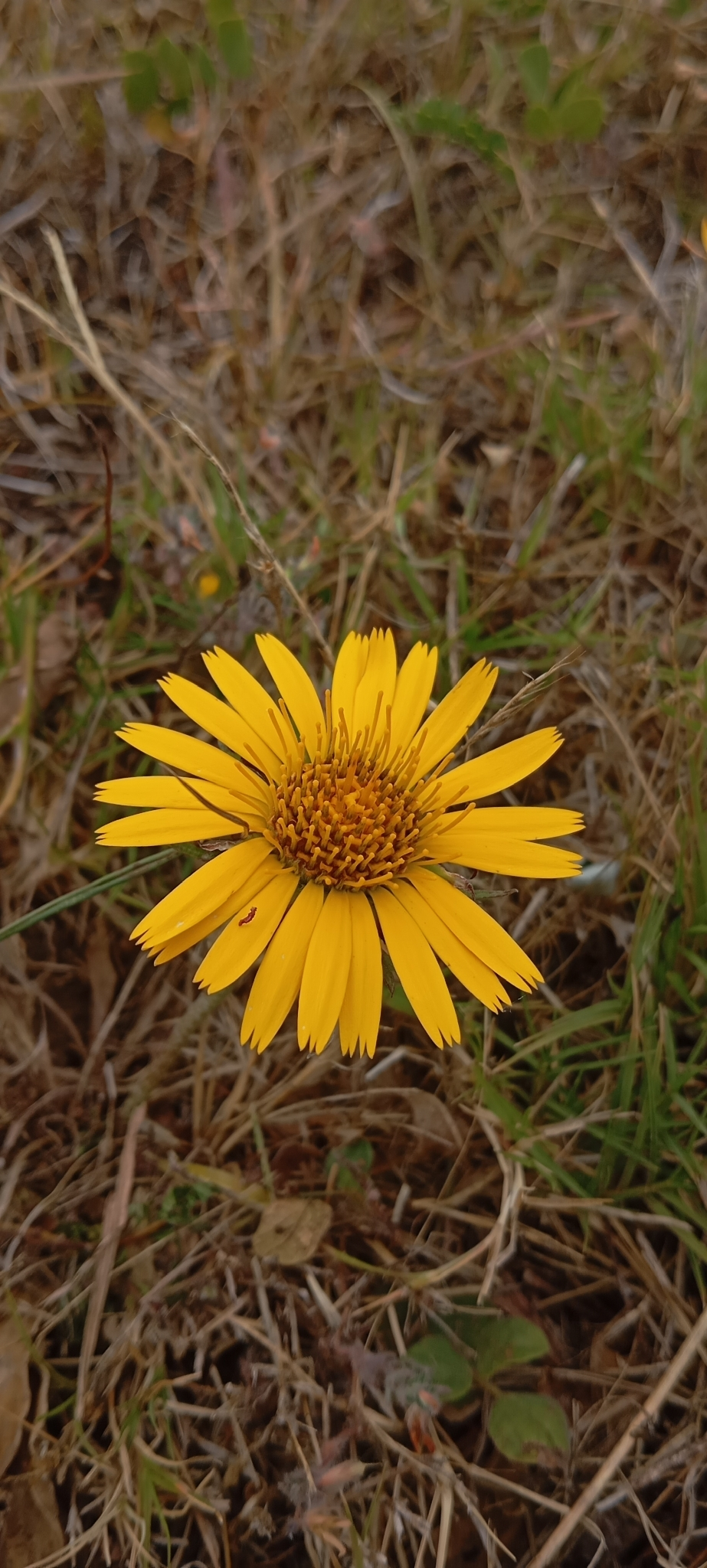

Scientific classification
- Kingdom: Plantae
- Clade: Tracheophytes
- Clade: Angiosperms
- Clade: Eudicots
- Clade: Asterids
- Order: Asterales
- Family: Asteraceae
- Genus: Trichocline
- Species: T. heterophylla

Binomial name
- Trichocline heterophylla Less.

Synonyms
- Chaptalia heterophylla D.Don; Onoseris heterophylla Spreng.

= Trichocline heterophylla =

Species of plant

Trichocline heterophylla is a plant in the family Asteraceae family, native to Uruguay.

It was first described i 1826 by Kurt Polycarp Joachim Sprengel as Onoseris heterophylla, but in 1830 was transferred to the genus Trichocline by Christian Friedrich Lessing.

The species epithet, heterophylla, is derived from the Greek heteros ("other" or "different"), and phyllon ("leaf") giving an adjective which describes the plant as having varied leaves.
