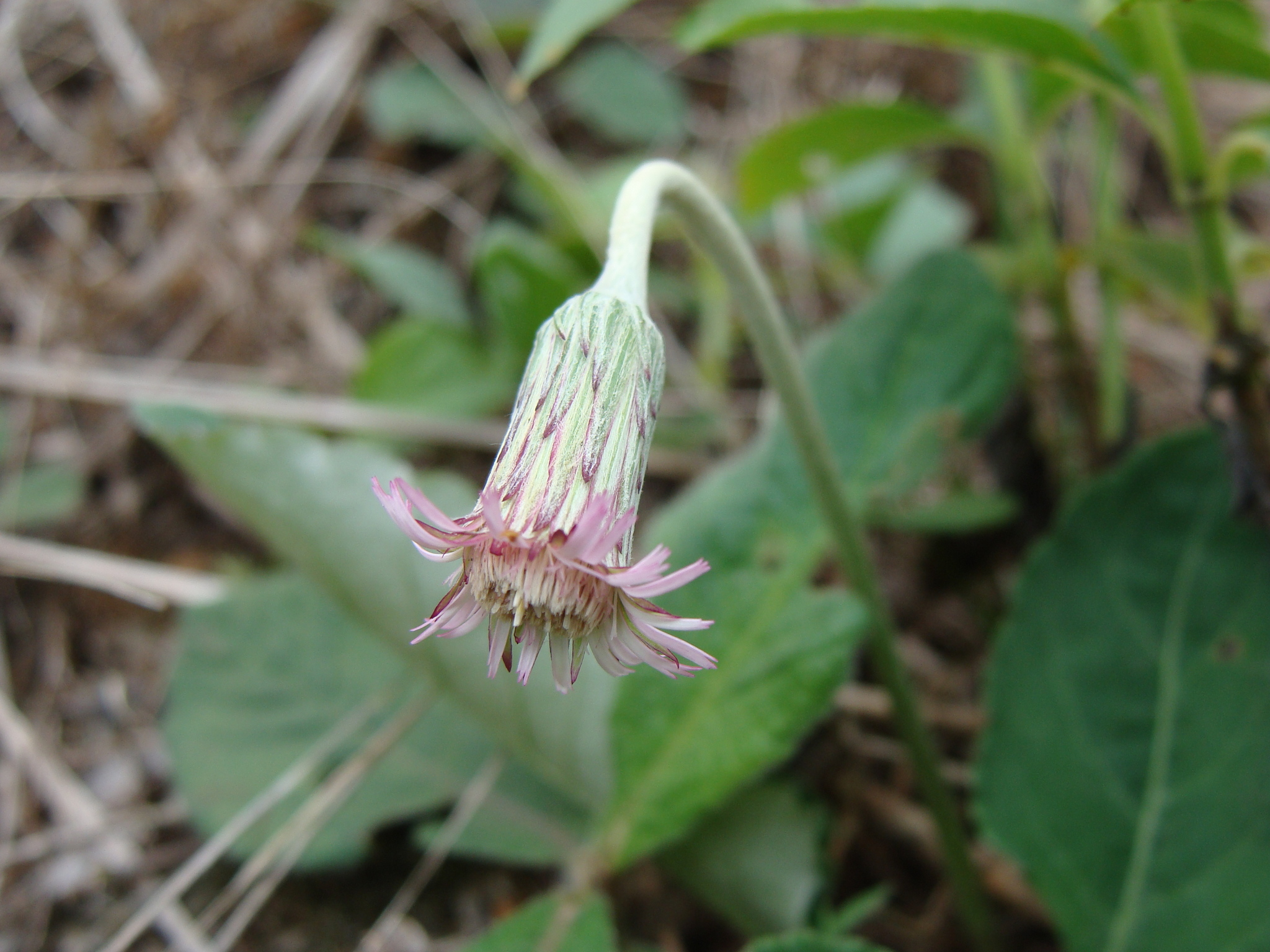
- Chaptalia nutans inflorescence

Scientific classification
- Kingdom: Plantae
- Clade: Tracheophytes
- Clade: Angiosperms
- Clade: Eudicots
- Clade: Asterids
- Order: Asterales
- Family: Asteraceae
- Genus: Chaptalia
- Species: C. nutans

Binomial name
- Chaptalia nutans (L.) Pol.

Synonyms
- List: Gerbera nutans (L.) Sch.Bip.; Leria nutans (L.) DC.; Thyrsanthema nutans (L.) Kuntze; Tussilago nutans L.; Chaptalia diversifolia Greene; Chaptalia ebracteata (Kuntze) K.Schum.; Chaptalia erosa Greene; Chaptalia majuscula Greene; Chaptalia subcordata Greene; Gerbera nutans var. leiocarpa M.Gómez; Leria lyrata Cass.; Leria nutans f. lyrata Less.; Sabbata polyphylla Vell.; Thyrsanthema ebracteata Kuntze; Tussilago vaccina Vell.

= Chaptalia nutans =

Species of flowering plant

Chaptalia nutans is a species of plant in the Asteraceae family native to tropical and subtropical America. It is the most common species of its genus.

== Description ==
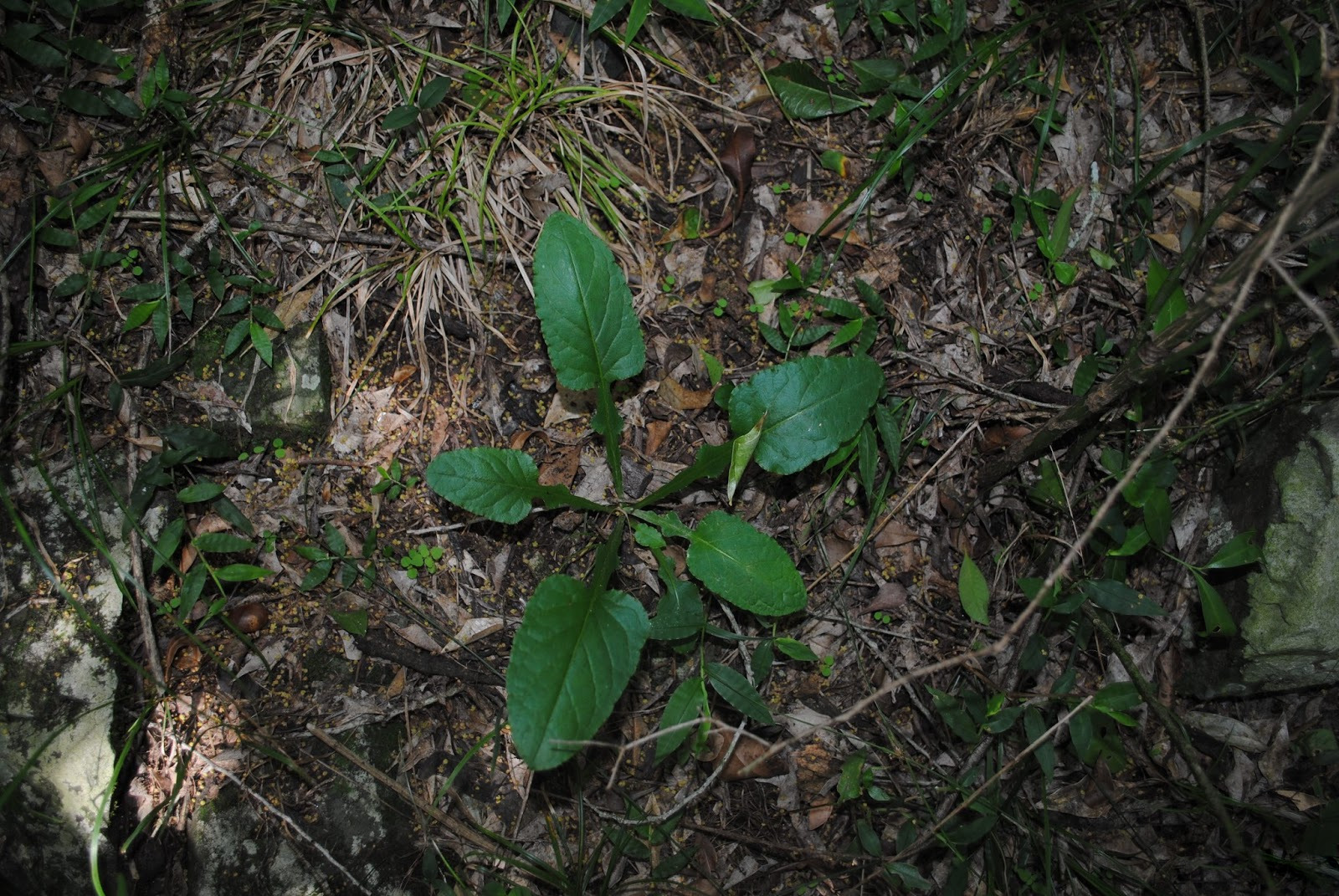
Chaptalia nutans rosette
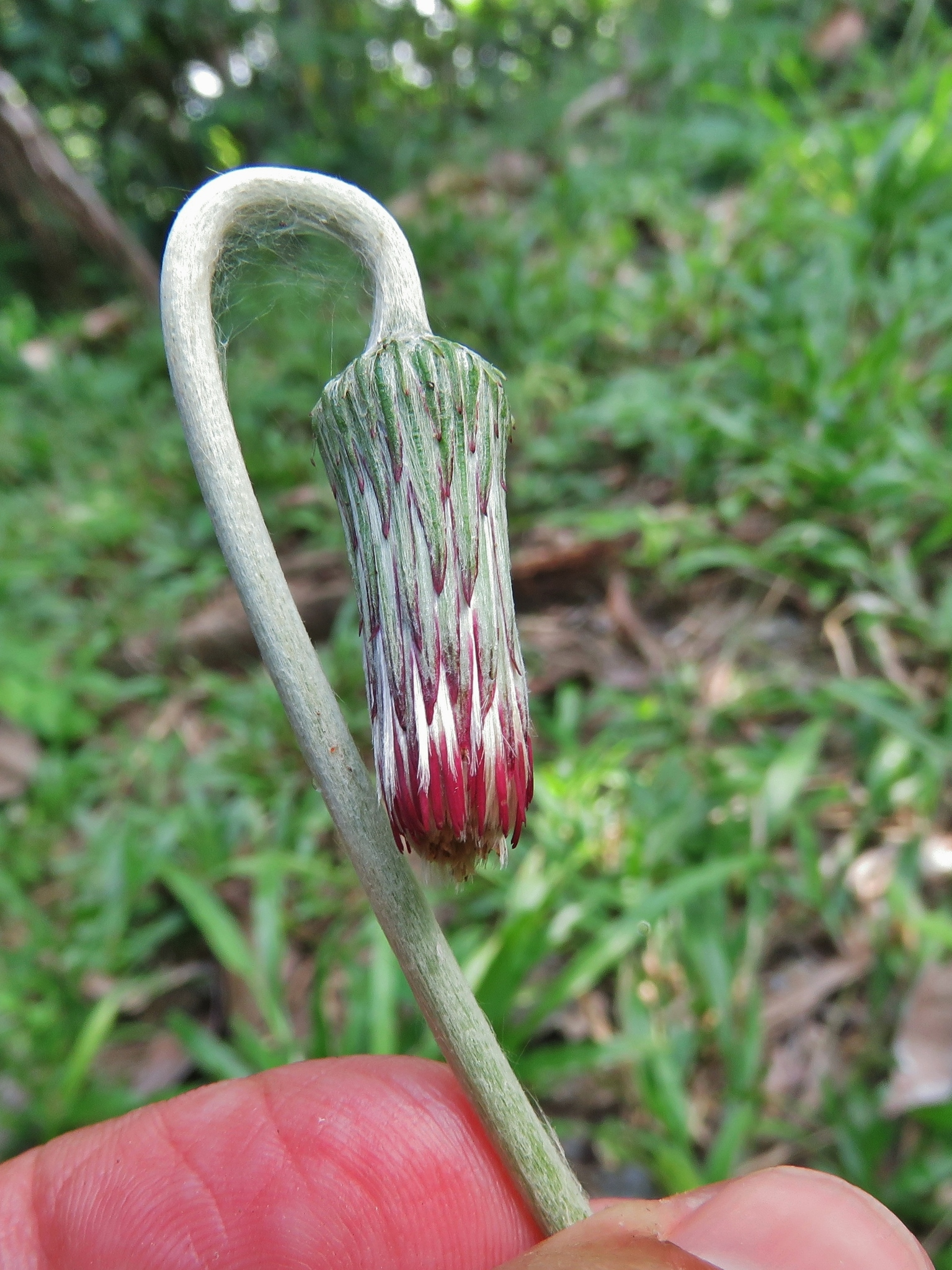
Characteristic nodding inflorescence of Chaptalia nutans

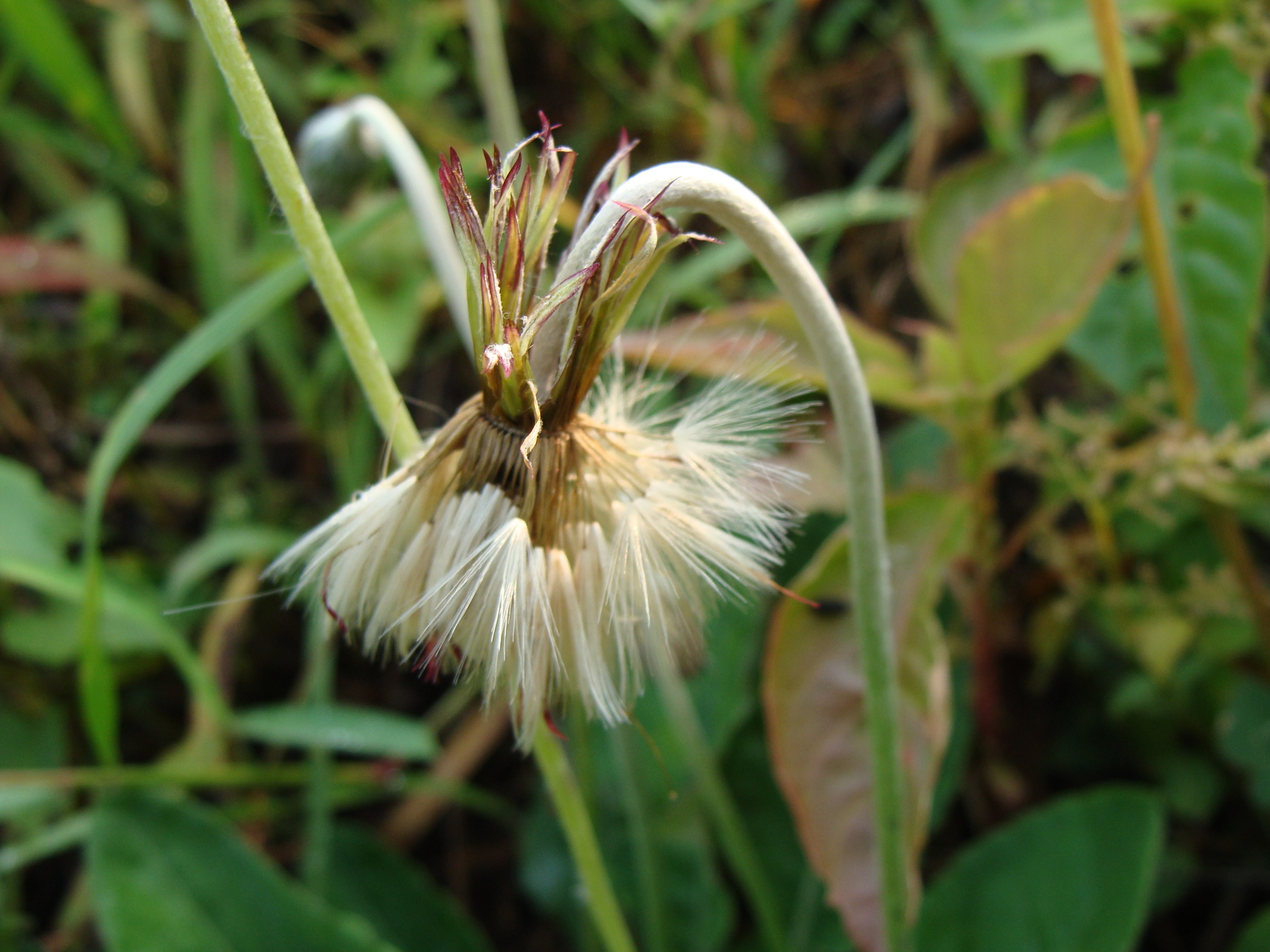
Chaptalia nutans infructescence

=== Vegetative characteristics ===
Chaptalia nutans is a perennial, rhizomatous, terrestrial herb with a short rhizome and adventitious, short primary roots and fibrous lateral roots. The small stem produces sessile, hairy, 5–20(–32) cm long, and 2.5–6 cm wide leaves.

=== Generative characteristics ===
The peduncles 10–60 cm long. The nodding capitulum has 150-320 florets. The achenes are 9–20 mm long. The cream-coloured pappus is 10–12 mm long.

=== Cytology ===
The diploid chromosome count is 2n = 48.

== Reproduction ==
In Brazil, flowering and fruiting occurs in October to January, when the dry season is coming to an end.

== Habitat ==
It occurs in warm and humid habitats in shade, and may also be found in habitats experiencing seasonal droughts.

== Taxonomy ==
It was first published as Tussilago nutans L. by Carl Linnaeus in 1759. It was transferred to the genus Chaptalia Vent. as Chaptalia nutans (L.) Pol. by Hellmuth Polakowski (1847–1917) in 1878.

=== Etymology ===
The specific epithet nutans means "nodding". It refers to the nodding inflorescences.

== Use ==
=== Folk medicine ===
It has applications in folk medicine.

=== Cultivation ===
It is easy to grow.
