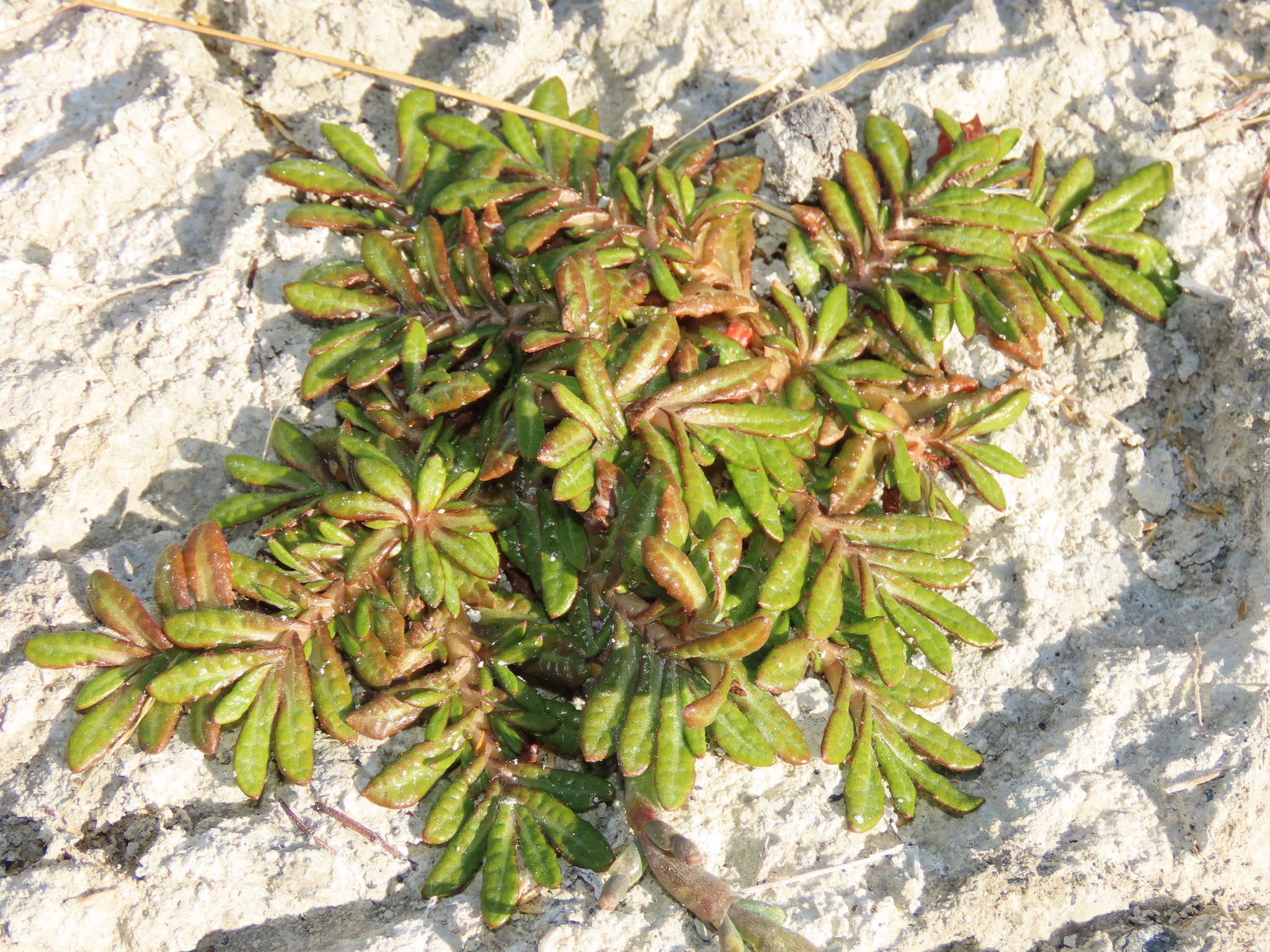

Scientific classification
- Kingdom: Plantae
- Clade: Tracheophytes
- Clade: Angiosperms
- Clade: Eudicots
- Clade: Asterids
- Order: Asterales
- Family: Asteraceae
- Subfamily: Mutisioideae
- Tribe: Mutisieae
- Genus: Eriachaenium; Sch.Bip.
- Species: E. magellanicum

Binomial name
- Eriachaenium magellanicum Sch.Bip.

Synonyms
- Eriochaenium Müll.Berol.

= Eriachaenium =

Genus of flowering plants

Eriachaenium is a genus of South American flowering plants in the family Asteraceae.

There is only one known species, Eriachaenium magellanicum, native to southern South America: Argentina (Tierra del Fuego, Chubut, Santa Cruz) and Chile (Magallanes).
