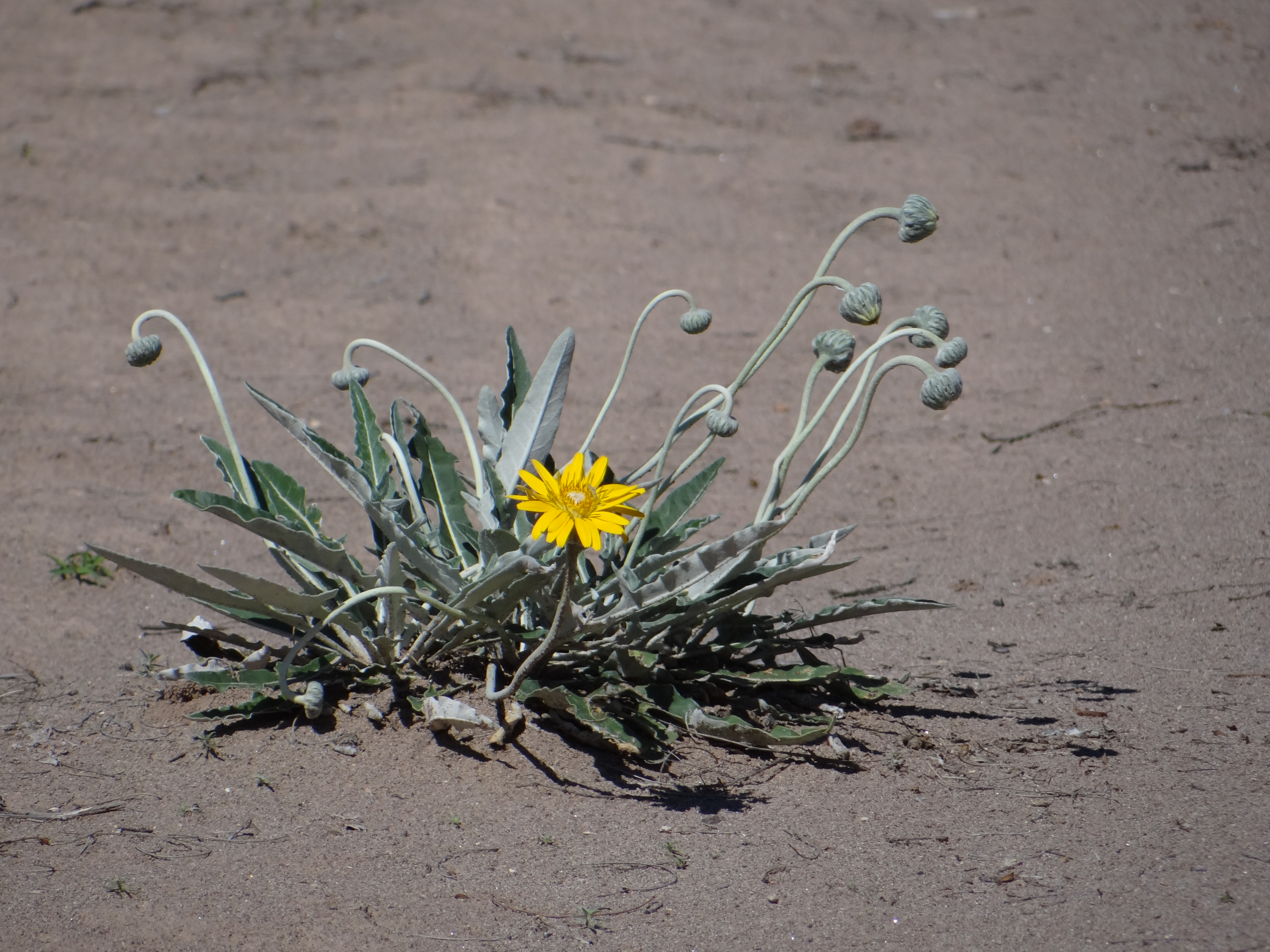
- Trichocline sinuata

Scientific classification
- Kingdom: Plantae
- Clade: Tracheophytes
- Clade: Angiosperms
- Clade: Eudicots
- Clade: Asterids
- Order: Asterales
- Family: Asteraceae
- Subfamily: Mutisioideae
- Tribe: Mutisieae
- Genus: Trichocline; Cass.

Type species
- Trichocline skirrophorum Sonder & F.Muell.

Synonyms
- Bichenia D.Don; Gerbera section Trichocline (Cass.) Baillon

= Trichocline =

Genus of flowering plants

Trichocline is a genus of South American plants in the tribe Mutisieae within the family Asteraceae. It includes twenty-three species native South America, which range from Bolivia and eastern Brazil to southern Argentina. The Australian species Trichocline spathulata was formerly included; it is now placed in the monotypic genus Amblysperma as A. spathulata.

Its closest relatives are Chaptalia, Gerbera, Leibnitzia, Perdicium, and Oreoseris. Together they form the Gerbera complex in the tribe Mutisieae.

== Species ==
23 species are accepted.

- Trichocline aurea (D.Don) Reiche – Chile
- Trichocline auriculata (Wedd.) Hieron. – Argentina, Bolivia
- Trichocline boecheri Cabrera – Argentina
- Trichocline catharinensis Cabrera – Rio Grande do Sul, Santa Catarina
- Trichocline caulescens Phil. – Chile
- Trichocline cineraria (D.Don) Hook. & Arn. – Chile, Argentina
- Trichocline cisplatina E.Pasini & M.R.Ritter – Brazil (Rio Grande do Sul), Uruguay
- Trichocline crispa Cabrera – Chile
- Trichocline dealbata (Hook. & Arn.) Benth. & Hook.f. ex Griseb. – Chile, Argentina
- Trichocline deserticola Zardini – Chile
- Trichocline exscapa Griseb. – Argentina
- Trichocline heterophylla (Spreng.) Less. – Brazil, Paraguay, Uruguay
- Trichocline humilis Less. - Argentina, Paraguay, Uruguay
- Trichocline incana (Lam.) Cass. – Chile, Bolivia, Argentina, Uruguay, Rio Grande do Sul
- Trichocline linearifolia Malme – Paraná
- Trichocline macrocephala Less. – Misiones, Paraná, Santa Catarina
- Trichocline macrorhiza Cabrera – Jujuy
- Trichocline maxima Less. – Brazil, Uruguay
- Trichocline minuana E.Pasini – Brazil (Rio Grande do Sul), Uruguay
- Trichocline plicata Hook. & Arn. – Argentina
- Trichocline reptans (Wedd.) Hieron. – Argentina, Paraguay, Bolivia
- Trichocline sinuata (D.Don) Cabrera – Argentina
- Trichocline speciosa Less. – Paraná, Argentina, Paraguay

=== Formerly included ===
see Actinoseris, Amblysperma, Chaptalia, Criscia Richterago, and Unxia

- Trichocline angustifolia - Unxia suffruticosa
- Trichocline arenaria - Richterago arenaria
- Trichocline cordifolia - Chaptalia cordifolia
- Trichocline heterophylla - Criscia stricta
- Trichocline oblonga - Chaptalia oblonga
- Trichocline ovalis - Chaptalia oblonga
- Trichocline radiata - Actinoseris radiata
- Trichocline spathulata - Amblysperma spathulata
