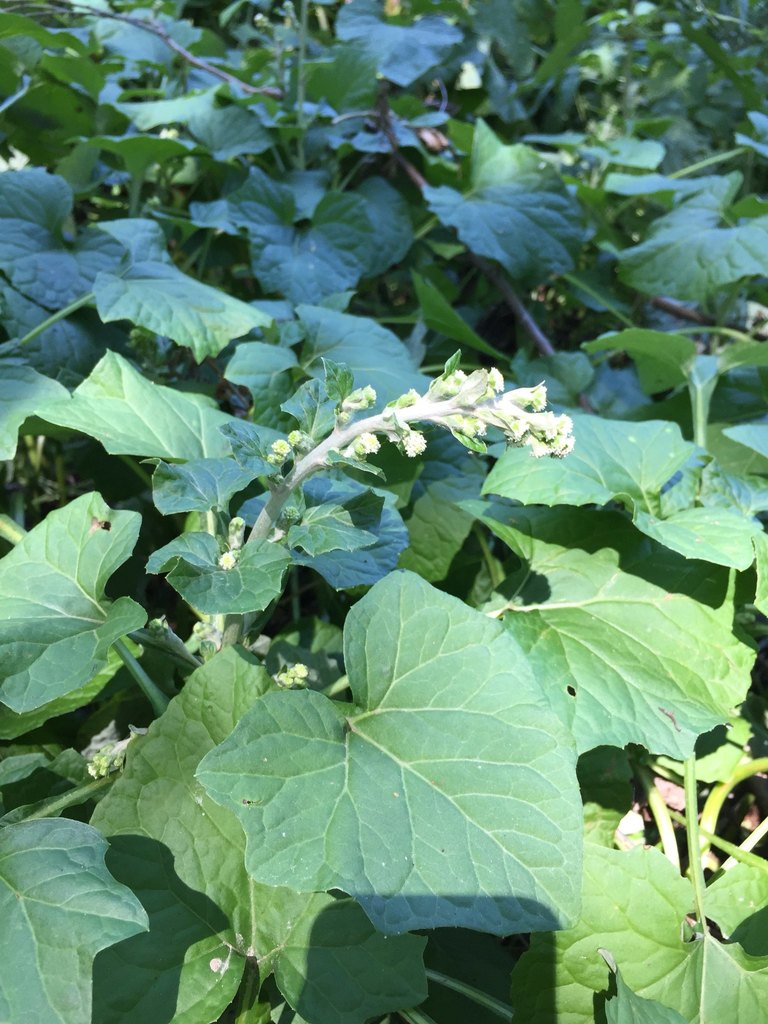

Scientific classification
- Kingdom: Plantae
- Clade: Tracheophytes
- Clade: Angiosperms
- Clade: Eudicots
- Clade: Asterids
- Order: Asterales
- Family: Asteraceae
- Genus: Adenocaulon
- Species: A. himalaicum

Binomial name
- Adenocaulon himalaicum Edgew.

= Adenocaulon himalaicum =

Species of flowering plant

Adenocaulon himalaicum is a species of perennial flowering plant in the family Asteraceae. It is native to China, Japan, India, Korea, and Nepal, and is an invasive species in Russia. It grows in shady places, often by the side of the road.

== Etymology ==
The genus name Adenocaulon is derived from the Greek words "αδένας" (gland) + "kaulós" (stem), and refers to the plant's glandular stem. The specific epithet refers to the plant being first described from the Himalayas. Adenocaulon himalaicum is known as nobuki (ノブキ, 野蕗) in Japanese.

== Description ==
The stem is erect and typically 30-100 cm tall. Leaves are basal and cauline, but the ones growing at the base wither before flowering. They are broad, dark green and irregularly toothed at the margin (sometimes entire). Inflorescences consist of tiny, 5-petaled white flowers. It is a monoecious plant, so flowers in the center are male, while the ones surrounding them are female. Fruit are 6-7 mm long club-shaped achenes, that start off light green but turn dark as they ripen. They are covered with sticky glands that let them attach to animal fur and human clothes. It flowers from June to late August, and bears fruit in September-November.

== Distribution and habitat ==
Adenocaulon himalaicum is native to China, Japan, India, Korea, and Nepal, and is an invasive species in Russia. It grows in forests, thickets, grassy slopes, and along stream sides.

== Gallery ==
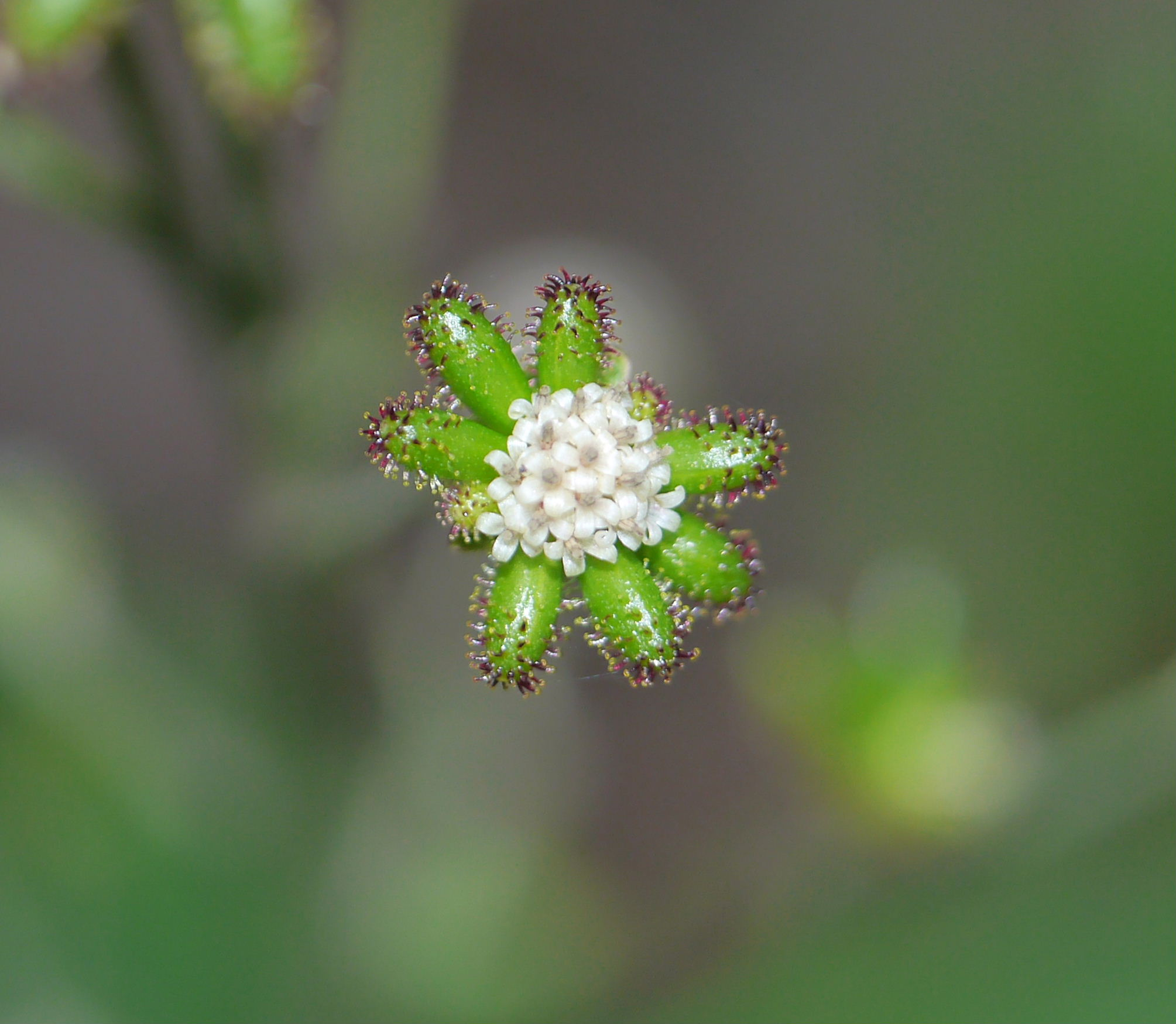
Close-up of central flowers and unripe fruit

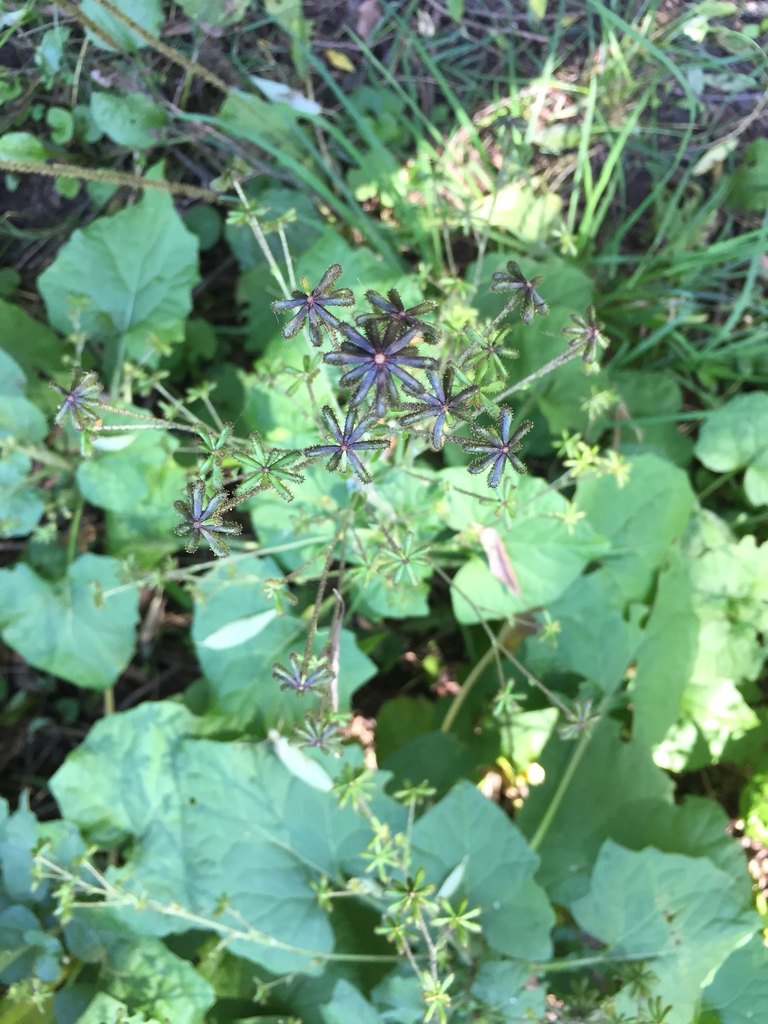
Ripe and unripe fruit on the plant

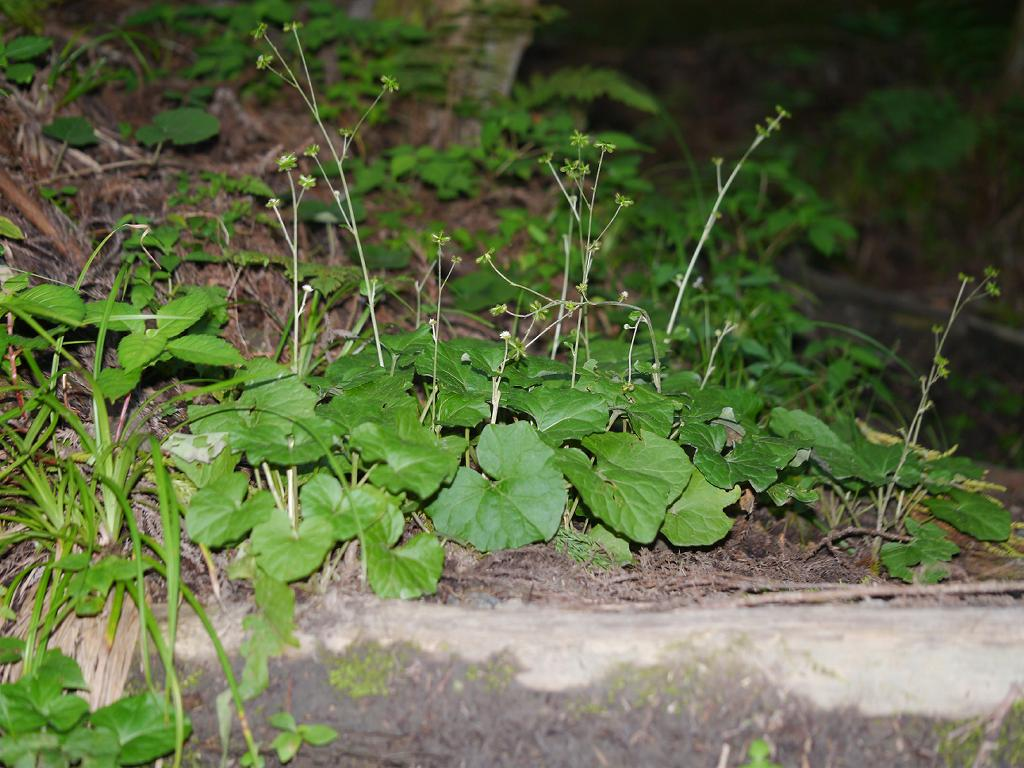
General appearance
