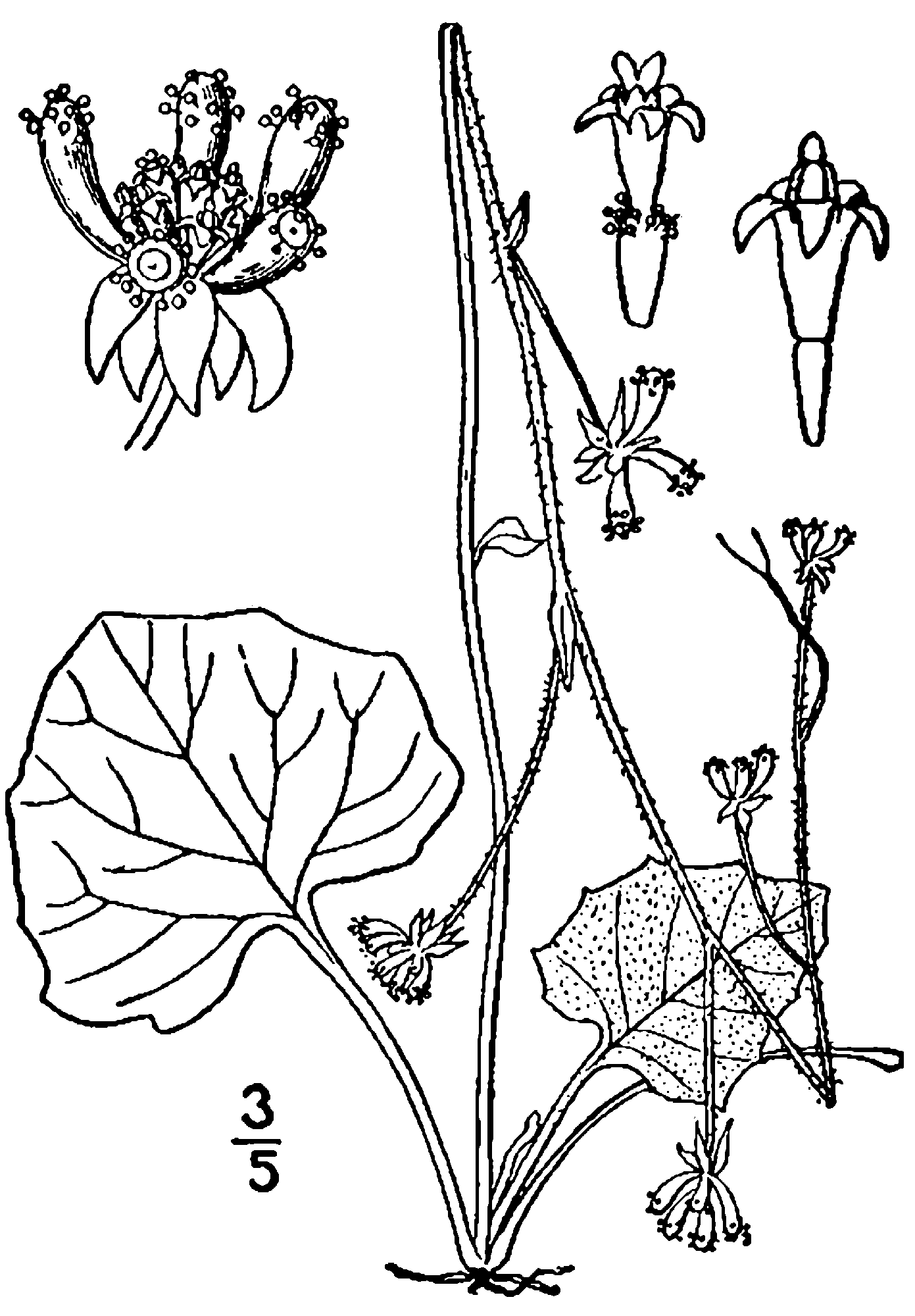
- Adenocaulon bicolor

Scientific classification
- Kingdom: Plantae
- Clade: Tracheophytes
- Clade: Angiosperms
- Clade: Eudicots
- Clade: Asterids
- Order: Asterales
- Family: Asteraceae
- Subfamily: Mutisioideae
- Tribe: Mutisieae
- Genus: Adenocaulon; Hook.

= Adenocaulon =

Genus of flowering plants

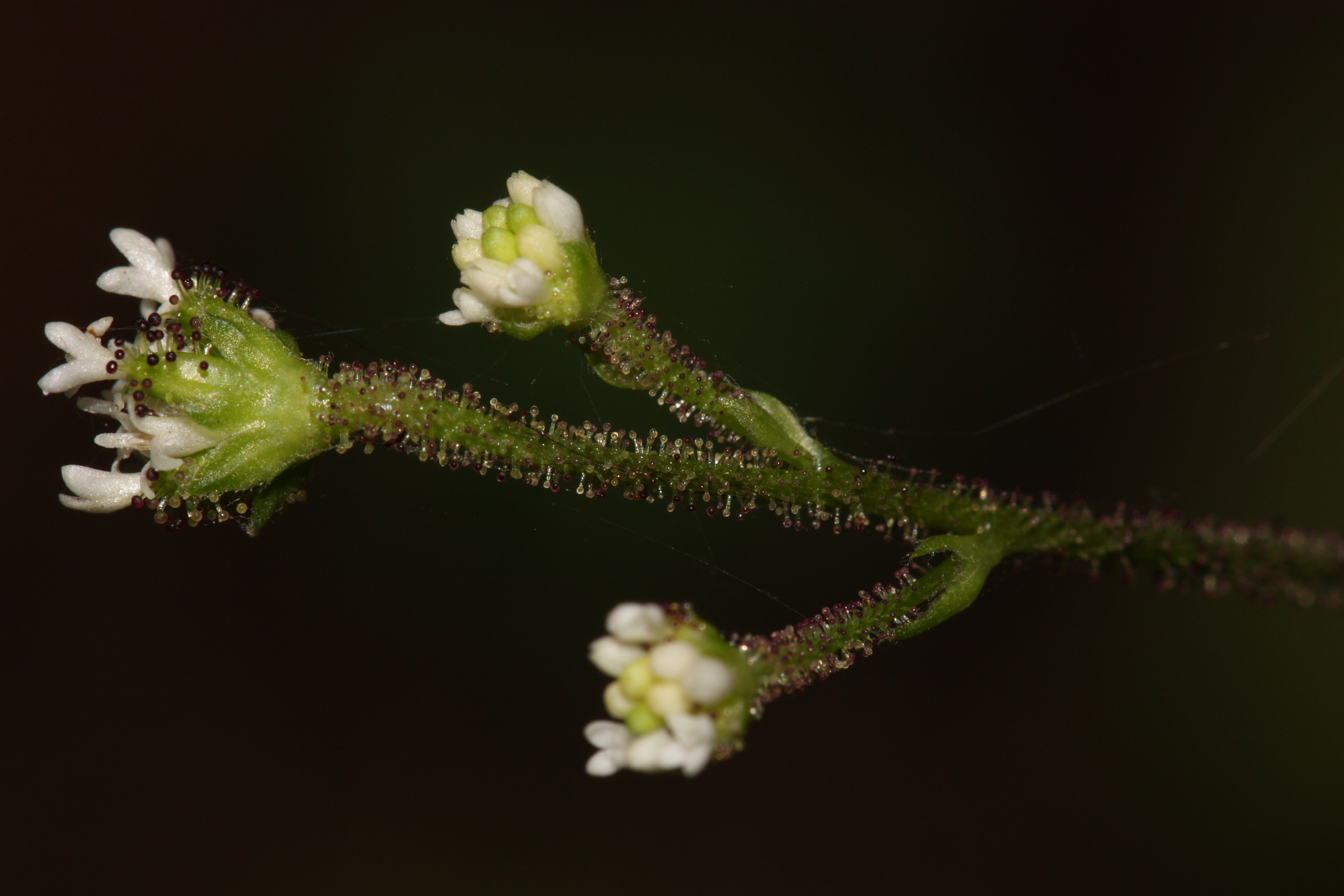
Adenocaulon bicolor

Adenocaulon is a small genus of flowering plants in the family daisy family known generally as trailplants. It was first described in 1829.

The genus is native to the Americas and Asia.

Species

- Adenocaulon bicolor Hook. - United States (MI WI SD WY MT ID WA OR CA), Canada (Ont Alb BC)
- Adenocaulon chilense Less. - Chile, Argentina
- Adenocaulon himalaicum Edgew. - China, India, Japan, Korea, Nepal, Russia
- Adenocaulon lyratum S.F.Blake - Guatemala, Chiapas
- Adenocaulon nepalense Bittmann - Nepal
