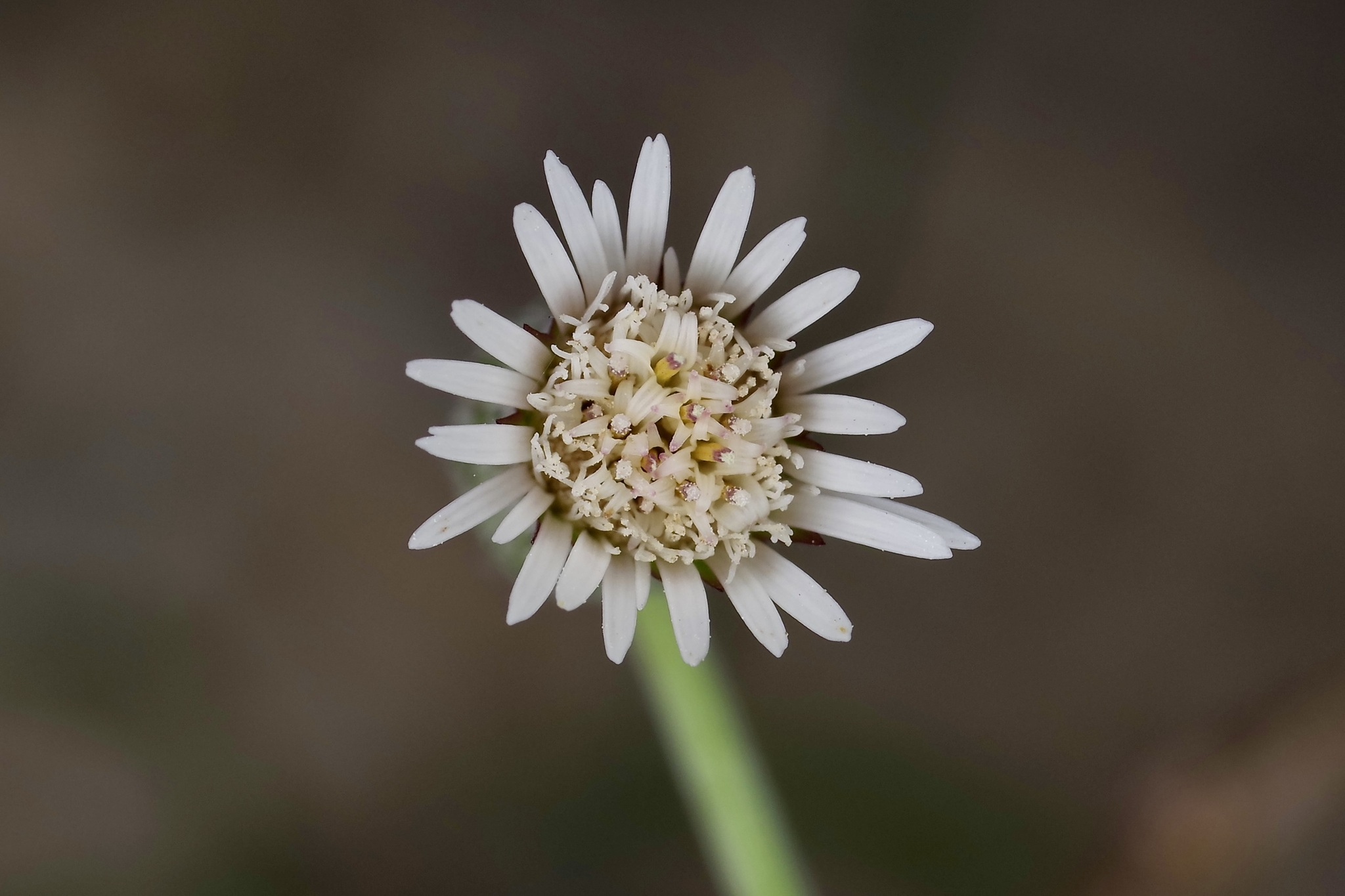

Scientific classification
- Kingdom: Plantae
- Clade: Tracheophytes
- Clade: Angiosperms
- Clade: Eudicots
- Clade: Asterids
- Order: Asterales
- Family: Asteraceae
- Genus: Chaptalia
- Species: C. texana

Binomial name
- Chaptalia texana Greene

Synonyms
- Chaptalia carduacea Greene; Chaptalia leonina Greene; Chaptalia nutans var. texana (Greene) Burkart; Chaptalia petrophila Greene

= Chaptalia texana =

Species of flowering plant

Chaptalia texana, common name silverpuff, is a North American species of plant in the family Asteraceae. It is native to Mexico, Texas, and New Mexico.

Chaptalia texana is a perennial plant growing from a large root. Leaves are in a basal rosette close to the ground, with dense woolly hairs on the underside but not on top. There is generally only one flower head, held on an unbranched stalk; head is nodding (hanging) at fruiting time but not at flowering time. Flowers are cream-colored, turning reddish as they get old.
