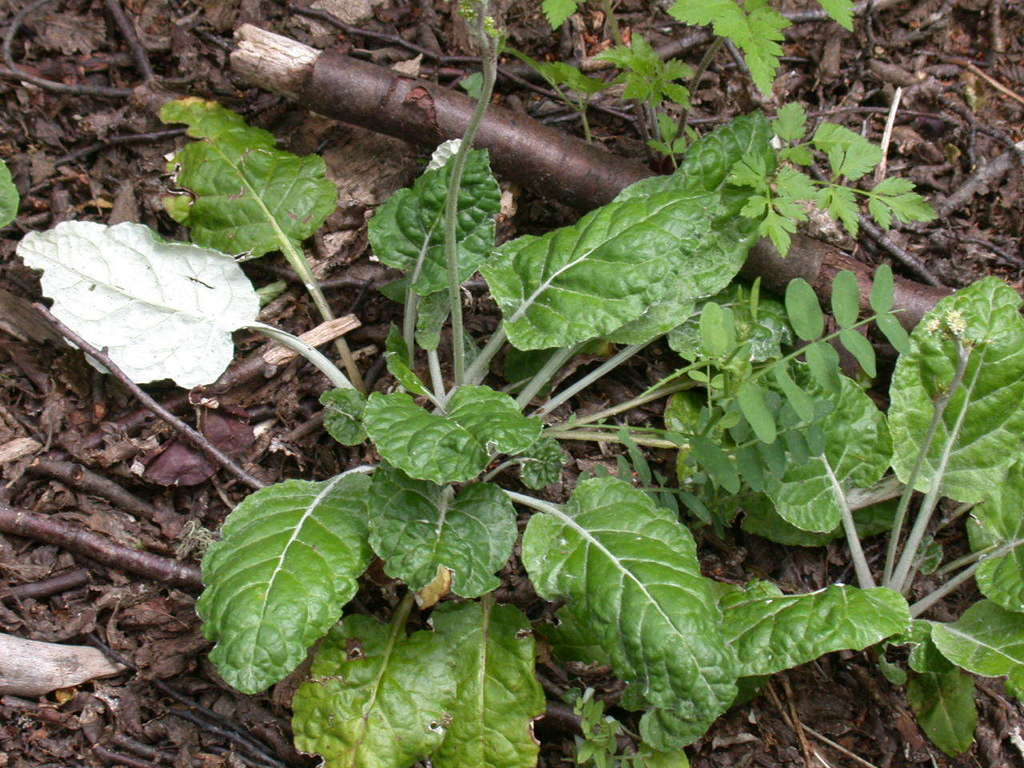

Scientific classification
- Kingdom: Plantae
- Clade: Tracheophytes
- Clade: Angiosperms
- Clade: Eudicots
- Clade: Asterids
- Order: Asterales
- Family: Asteraceae
- Genus: Adenocaulon
- Species: A. chilense

Binomial name
- Adenocaulon chilense Less.

Synonyms
- Adenocaulon lechleri Sch.Bip.; Boerhavia nudicaulis Phil.

= Adenocaulon chilense =

Species of flowering plant

Adenocaulon chilense is a species of flowering plant in the family Asteraceae. In English it is also known as straightflowered trailplant. It is native to southern South America. The plant is perennial and herbaceous, and the fruit is an achene.
