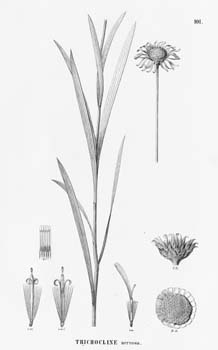

Scientific classification
- Kingdom: Plantae
- Clade: Embryophytes
- Clade: Tracheophytes
- Clade: Angiosperms
- Clade: Eudicots
- Clade: Asterids
- Order: Asterales
- Family: Asteraceae
- Subfamily: Mutisioideae
- Tribe: Mutisieae
- Genus: Lulia; Zardini
- Species: L. nervosa

Binomial name
- Lulia nervosa (Less.) Zardini

Synonyms
- Trichocline nervosa Less.; Vernonia araujoa H.Rob.

= Lulia =

Genus of flowering plants

Lulia is a genus of Brazilian flowering plants in the family Asteraceae. There is only one known species, Lulia nervosa, native to Brazil (States of Paraná, Santa Catarina, São Paulo).
