= Chaetanthera elegans =

Scientific classification
- Kingdom: Plantae
- Clade: Tracheophytes
- Clade: Angiosperms
- Clade: Eudicots
- Clade: Asterids
- Order: Asterales
- Family: Asteraceae
- Genus: Chaetanthera
- Species: C. elegans

Binomial name
- Chaetanthera elegans Phil., 1856

Subspecies
- Chaetanthera elegans var. andina (Phil.) Cabrera; Chaetanthera elegans var. elegans Chaetanthera elegans var. pratensis (Phil.) Cabrera; Chaetanthera elegans var. pulchra Cabrera

Species of flowering plant

Chaetanthera elegans is a flowering plant species in the genus Chaetanthera that is found in Chile.
