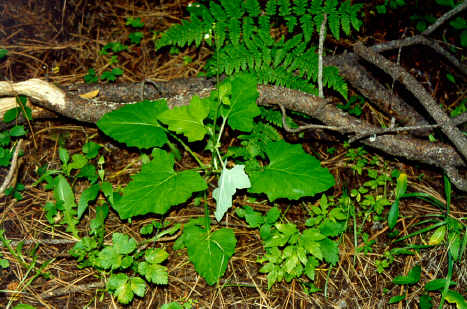

Scientific classification
- Kingdom: Plantae
- Clade: Tracheophytes
- Clade: Angiosperms
- Clade: Eudicots
- Clade: Asterids
- Order: Asterales
- Family: Asteraceae
- Genus: Adenocaulon
- Species: A. bicolor

Binomial name
- Adenocaulon bicolor Hook.

= Adenocaulon bicolor =

Species of flowering plant

Adenocaulon bicolor, the American trailplant, trailplant, pathfinder, or silver-green, is a flowering plant in the family Asteraceae. It is native to North America. It is found in southern Canada and across the northern and western United States. It is the only species of Adenocaulon native to North America.

== Etymology ==
The genus name Adenocaulon is derived from Greek, and refers to the glandular stem. The English name "Pathfinder" was given to this species, as walking through a patch of the plant will cause some of the white undersides of the leaves to be twisted upwards, revealing the path taken through the patch. Over time, the plant will turn its leaves back with the green side up, and the white side down.

== Description ==
This plant has a thin, glandular, erect, branching stem surrounded by triangular leaves that grow only at the base. The basal leaves are triangular with densely white-hairy lower surfaces, while the upper surface is green, hence bicolor. Each leaf grows up to 15 cm (5.9 in) wide. The leaf edges are coarsely toothed and sometimes entire (lacking teeth). The stem reaches around 90 cm (35 in) tall. Upon the branches are tiny inflorescences of white flowers, each flower measuring only a few millimeters in width. Around each inflorescence grows a distinctive array of club-shaped fruits covered in tiny, stalked, sticky glands. The seeds are dispersed by sticking to the fur of animals and the clothes of people who walk past the stalks.

American trailplant can be found in the understory of moist woods and forests, often near trails.

The plant flowers put out a slightly foul smell to charm small flies.

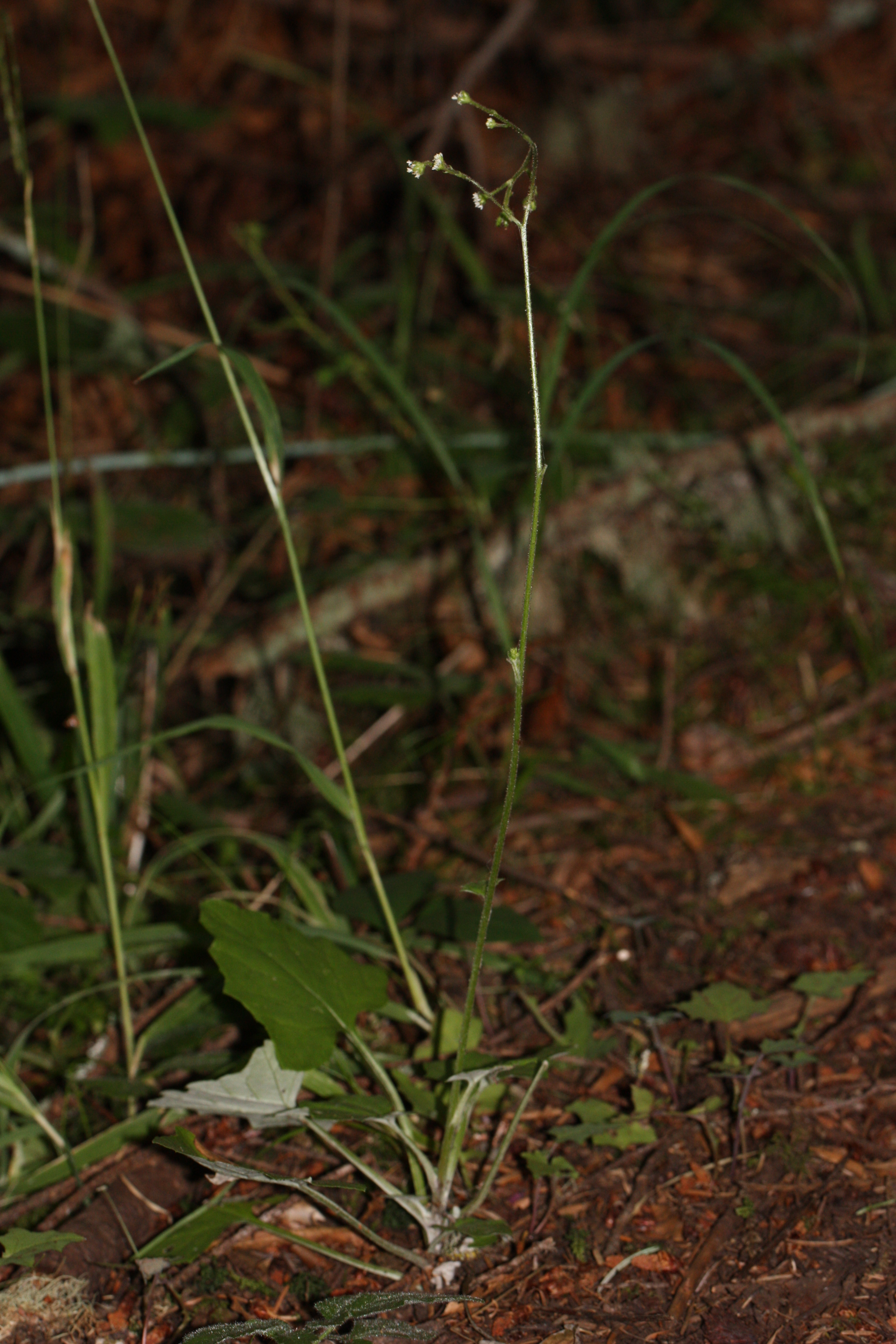
Entire plant

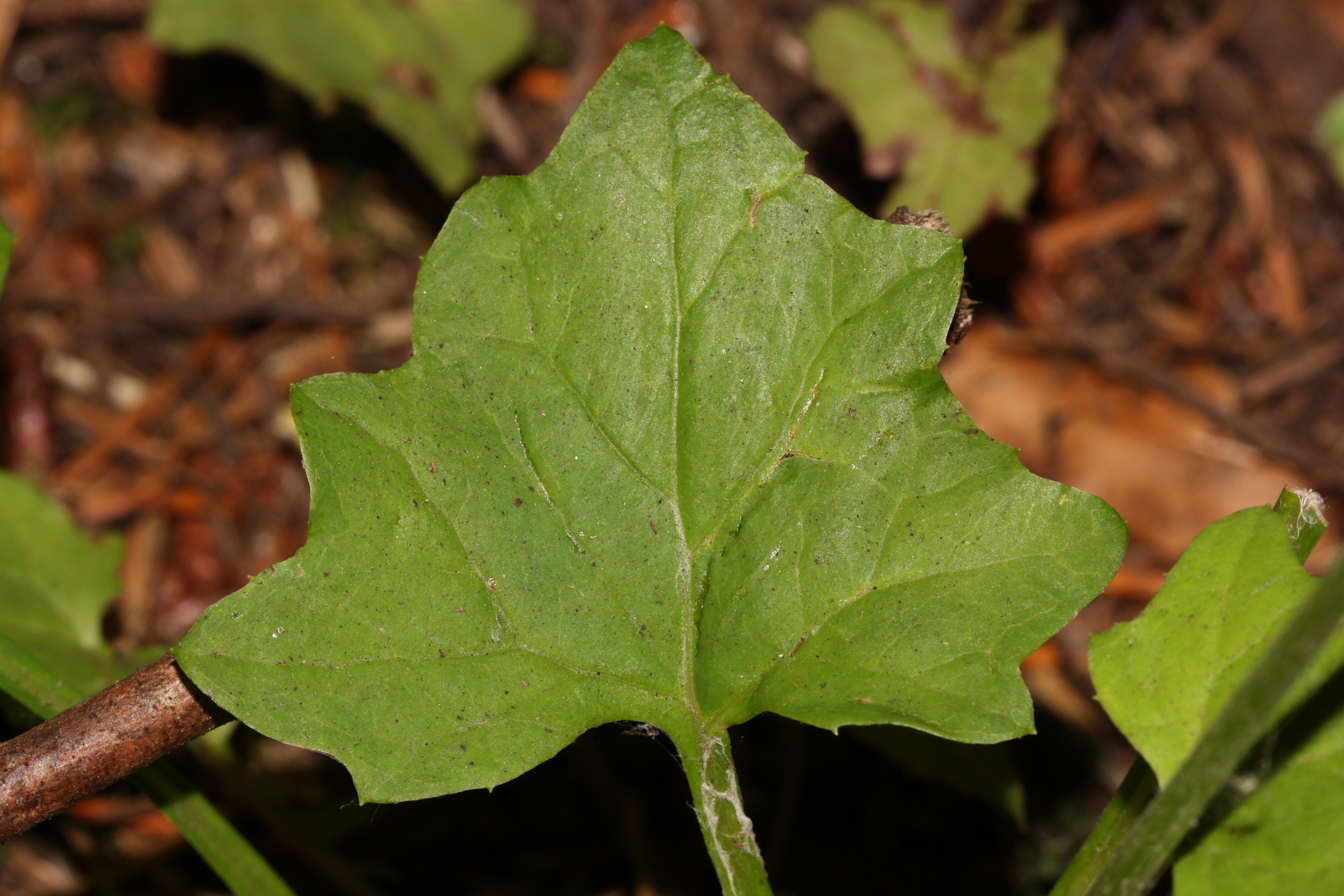
Upper surface of the leaf

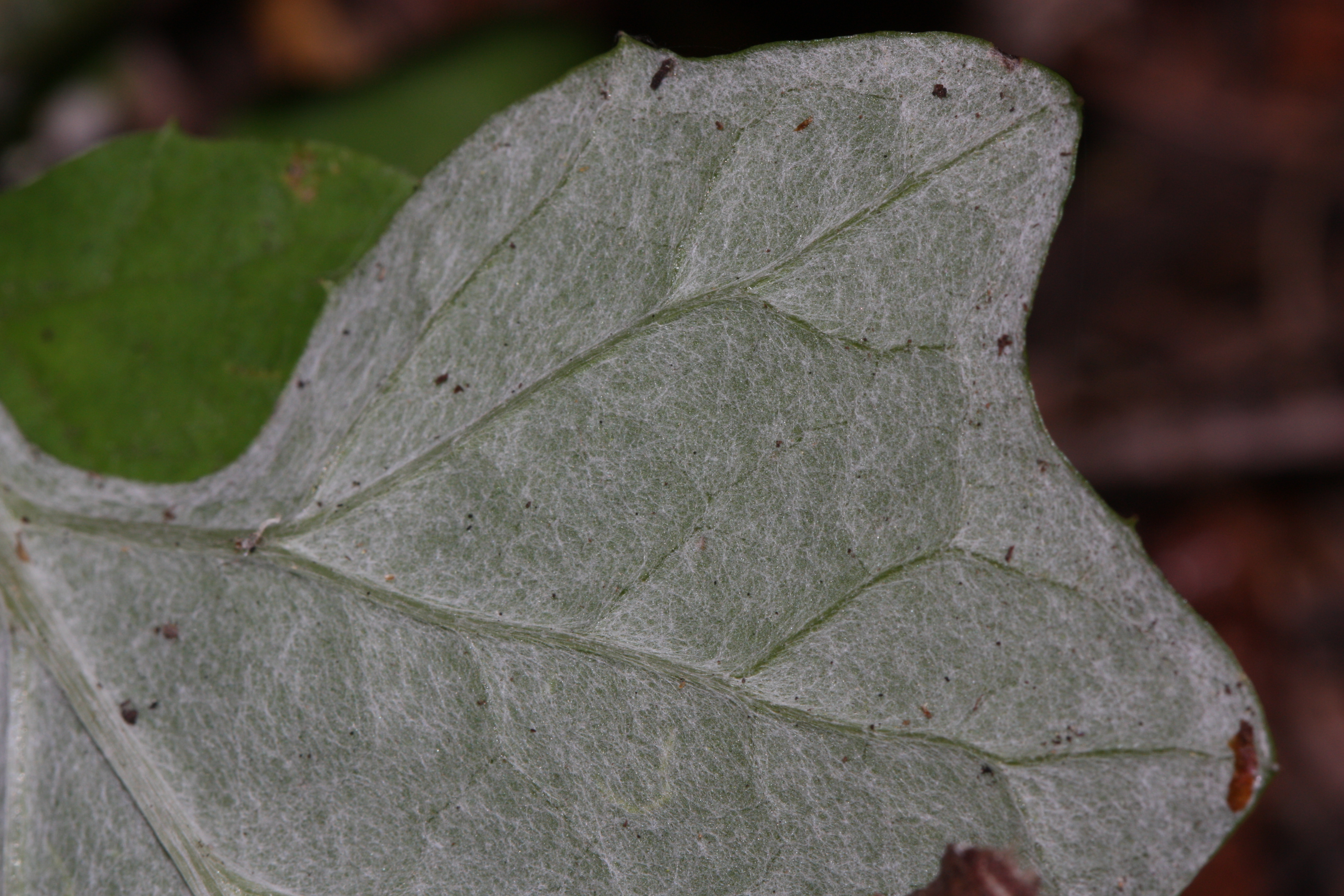
White-hairy lower surface of the leaf

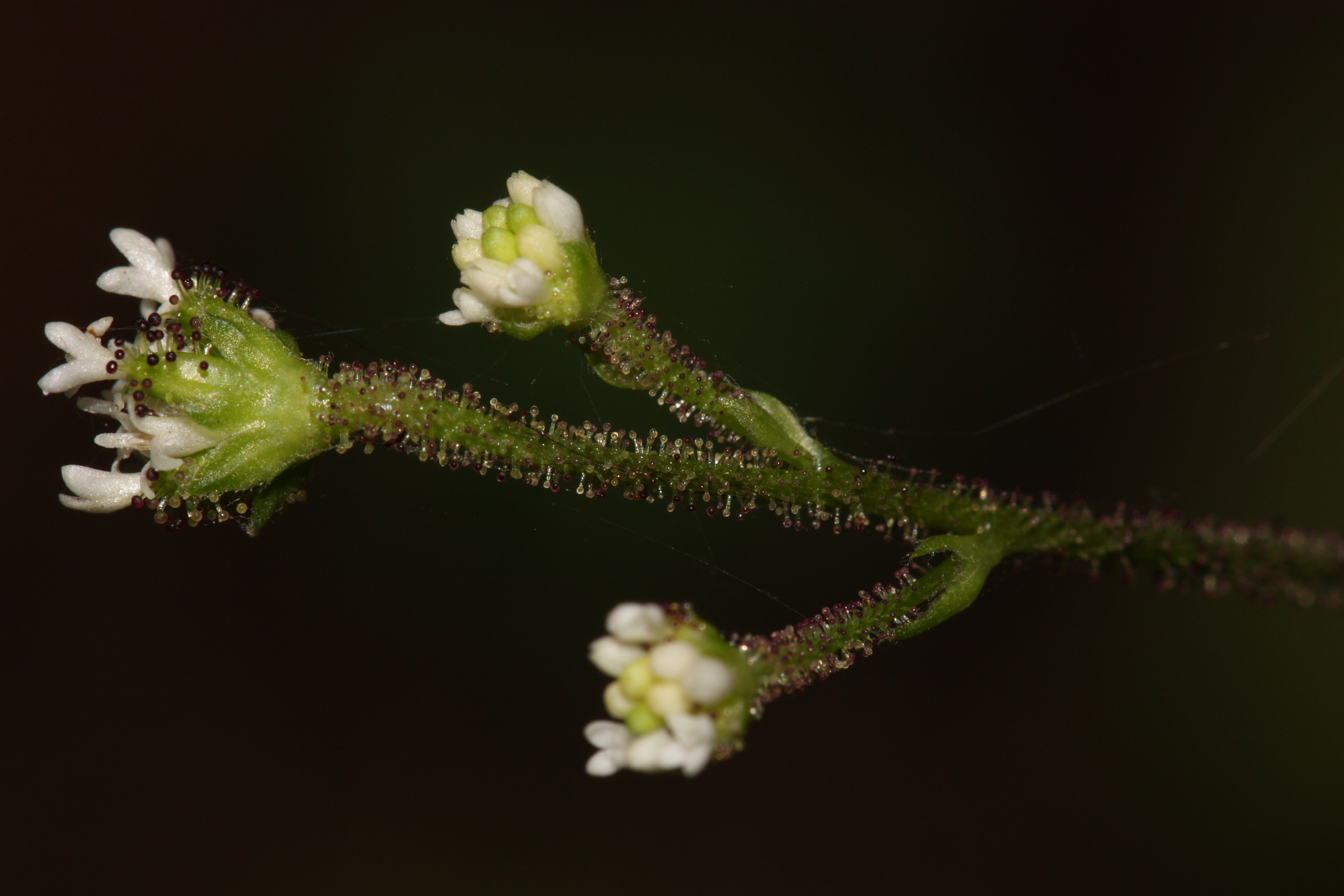
Close-up of the flowerhead and glandular stem
