= Chaptalia albicans =

Conservation status
- Secure (NatureServe)

Scientific classification
- Kingdom: Plantae
- Clade: Tracheophytes
- Clade: Angiosperms
- Clade: Eudicots
- Clade: Asterids
- Order: Asterales
- Family: Asteraceae
- Genus: Chaptalia
- Species: C. albicans

Binomial name
- Chaptalia albicans (Sw.) B.D. Jacks.

Synonyms
- Chaptalia albicans (Sw.) Vent. ex Steud. (Invalid because listed as synonym); Chaptalia crispula Greene; Chaptalia fallax Greene; Chaptalia integrifolia var. leiocarpa (DC.) Baker; Chaptalia leiocarpa (DC.) Urb.; Chaptalia nutans var. leiocarpa (DC.) Hitchc.; Chaptalia nutans var. leiocarpa (DC.) Griseb.; Chaptalia obovata C. Wright; Gerbera albicans Sch.Bip.; Gerbera leiocarpa (DC.) Sch.Bip.; Leontodon tomentosum L.f.; Leria albicans (Sw.) DC. (Illegitimate); Leria albicans (Sw.) A. DC.; Leria leiocarpa DC.; Leria nutans var. leiocarpa Griseb.; Thyrsanthema tomentosum (L.f.) Kuntze; Tussilago albicans Sw.

Species of flowering plant

Chaptalia albicans, the white sunbonnet, is a plant species native to Mexico, Central America and the West Indies. It is known from Jamaica, Cuba, Guatemala, Belize, Honduras, southern Florida (only in Miami-Dade County), the Bahamas, Hispaniola, Puerto Rico, San Luis Potosí, Veracruz, Yucatán, Campeche and Chiapas.

Chaptalia albicans is a herb forming a rosette of leaves. Leaves are elliptical, with margins that are wavy or slightly toothed but not lobed. Flowering stalks up to 15 cm tall at flowering time, 40 cm when the fruits are mature. Heads erect, with ray flowers up to 0.3 mm across. Achenes are up to 12 mm long, with a thread-like beak 50-67% as long as the body of the achene, usually hairless.
