= Chucoa =

Scientific classification
- Kingdom: Plantae
- Clade: Embryophytes
- Clade: Tracheophytes
- Clade: Angiosperms
- Clade: Eudicots
- Clade: Asterids
- Order: Asterales
- Family: Asteraceae
- Subfamily: Mutisioideae
- Tribe: Mutisieae
- Genus: Chucoa; Cabrera

Type species
- Chucoa ilicifolia Cabrera

Synonyms
- Weberbaueriella Ferreyra

Genus of flowering plants

Chucoa is a genus of South American flowering plants in the family Asteraceae.

Species

- Chucoa ilicifolia Cabrera – Peru
- Chucoa lanceolata (H.Beltrán & Ferreyra) G.Sancho, S.E.Freire & Katinas - Bolivia, Peru
