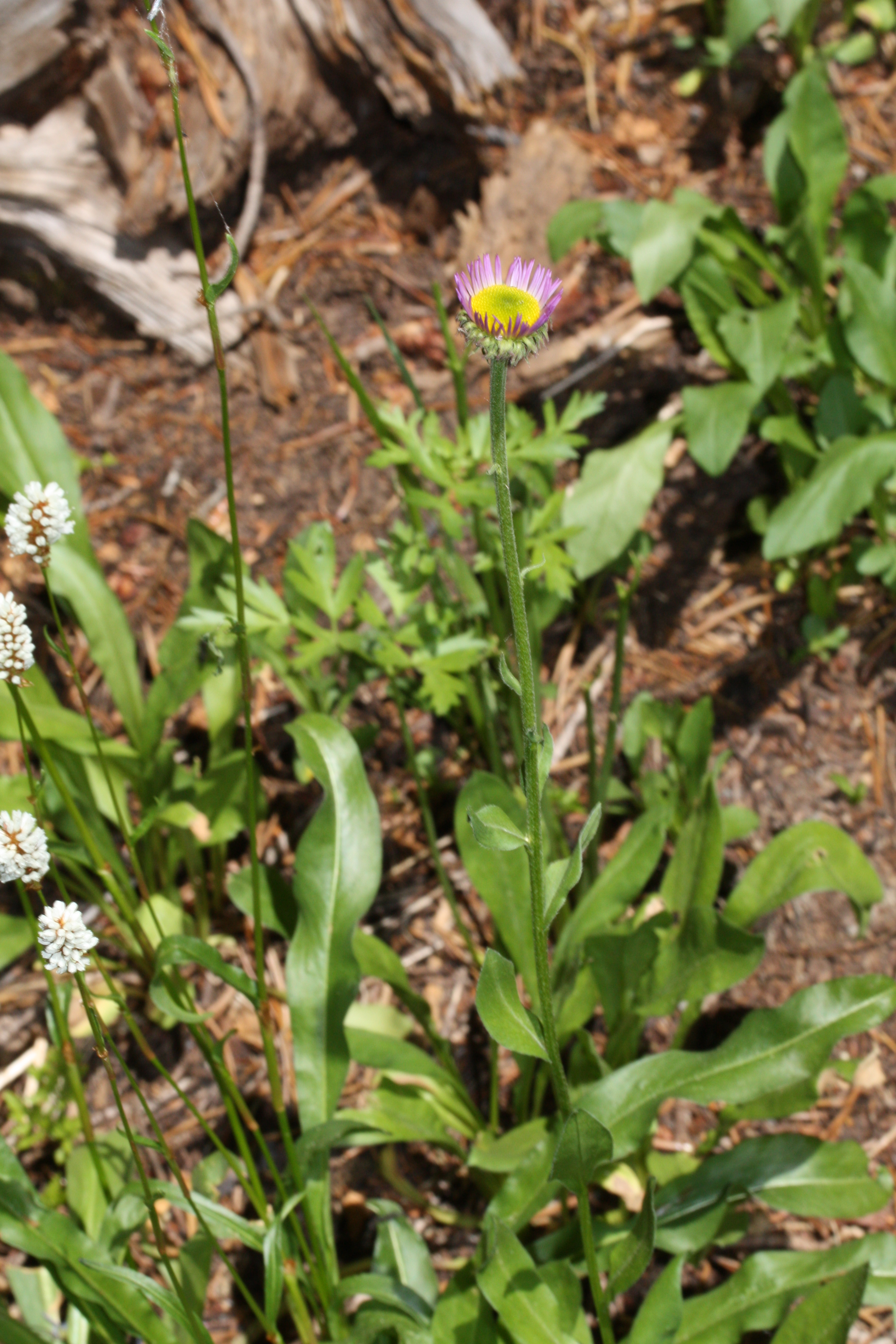

Scientific classification
- Kingdom: Plantae
- Clade: Tracheophytes
- Clade: Angiosperms
- Clade: Eudicots
- Clade: Asterids
- Order: Asterales
- Family: Asteraceae
- Genus: Oreostemma
- Species: O. alpigenum

Binomial name
- Oreostemma alpigenum (Torr. & A.Gray) Greene

= Oreostemma alpigenum =

Species of shrub

Oreostemma alpigenum (formerly Aster alpigenus) is a perennial plant to subshrub in the family Asteraceae of the mountains of western United States, commonly known as tundra aster or Anderson's mountain crown.
