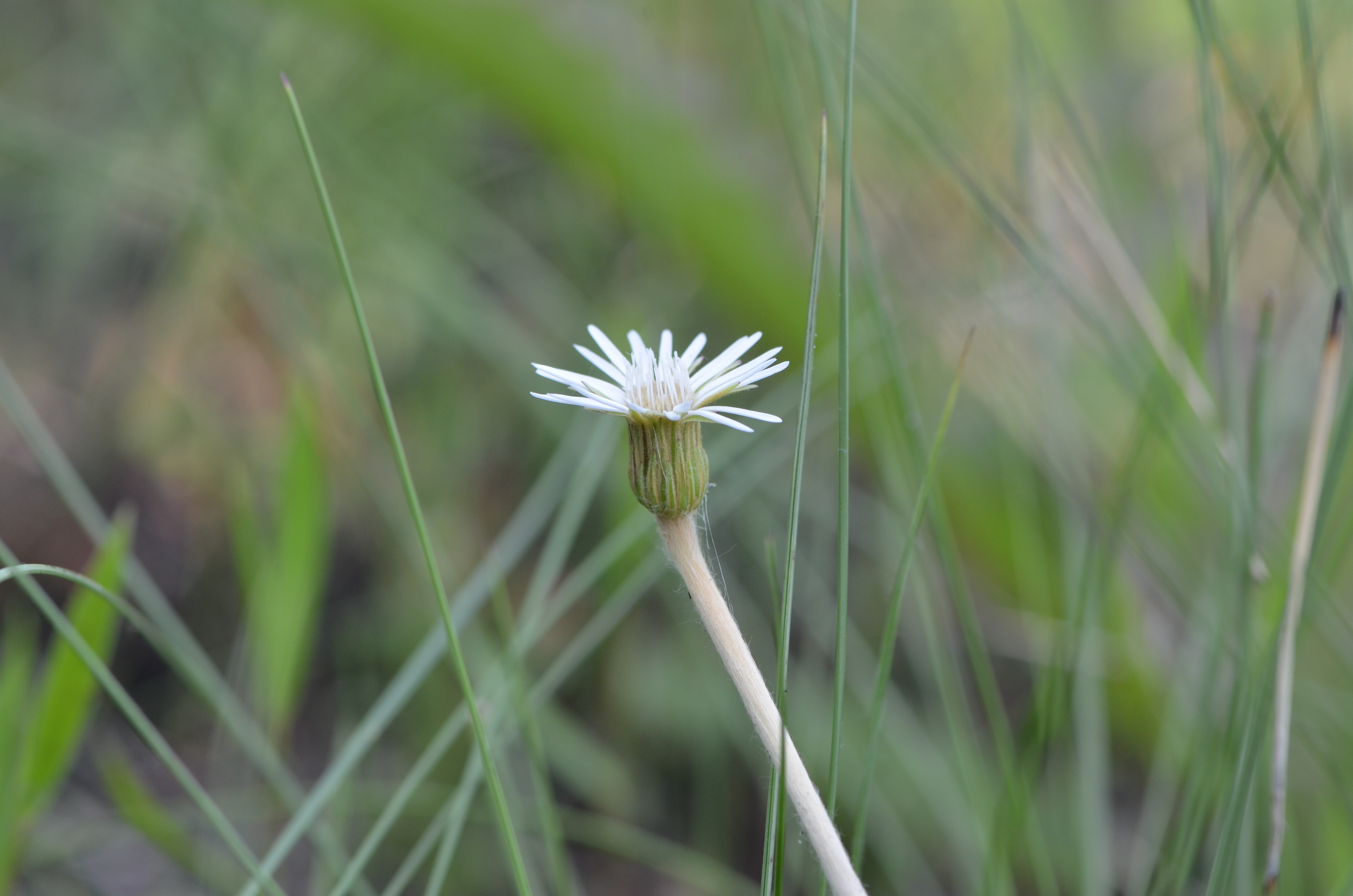

Scientific classification
- Kingdom: Plantae
- Clade: Tracheophytes
- Clade: Angiosperms
- Clade: Eudicots
- Clade: Asterids
- Order: Asterales
- Family: Asteraceae
- Genus: Chaptalia
- Species: C. tomentosa

Binomial name
- Chaptalia tomentosa Vent.

Synonyms
- Chaptalia integrifolia (Michx.) Nutt.; Chaptalia semifloscularis (Walter) B.L.Rob.; Gerbera walteri Sch.Bip.; Tussilago integrifolia Michx.

= Chaptalia tomentosa =

Species of flowering plant

Chaptalia tomentosa, common name pineland daisy, is a plant species native to the southeastern United States. It has been reported from southern Alabama, Florida, southern Georgia, Louisiana, eastern Texas, southern Mississippi, eastern North Carolina and South Carolina. Some publications report the species from the West Indies as well, but this is based on the assumption that C. azurensis is a synonym of C. tomentosa.

Chaptalia tomentosa is type species for the genus Chaptalia, and is found in sandy soil in bogs, savannahs, and open areas in the Atlantic and Gulf coastal plain.

Chaptalia tomentosa is a perennial herb forming a rosette of leaves, but no underground rhizome. Leaves are elliptical, up to 25 cm long, densely gray-white to orange on the underside because of a thick coat of hairs. Ray flowers are cream-colored with a purple streak along the underside. Achenes are glabrous, up to 6 mm long with a slender hairy neck at the top 20-25% as long as the body of the achene.
