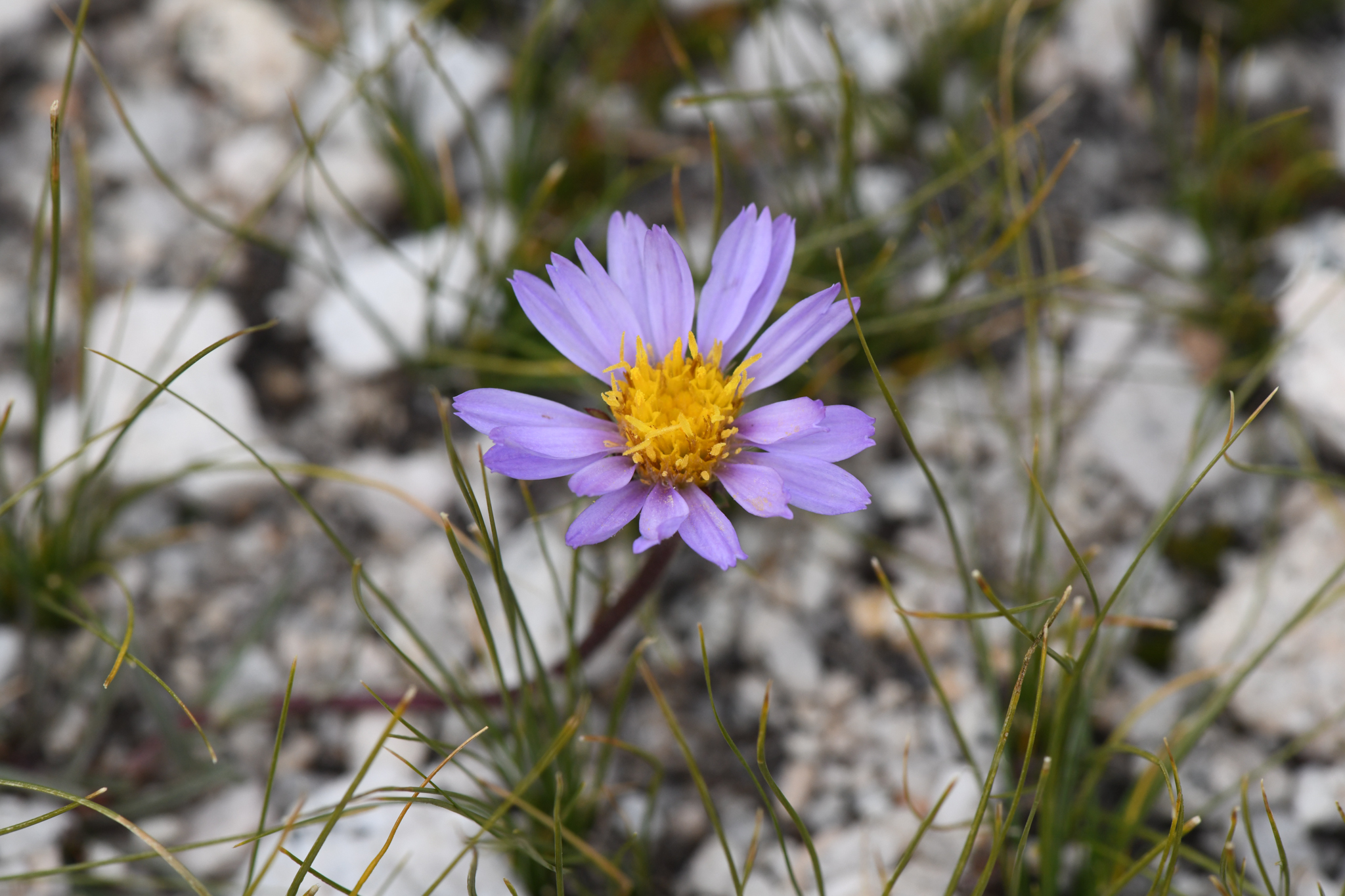

Scientific classification
- Kingdom: Plantae
- Clade: Tracheophytes
- Clade: Angiosperms
- Clade: Eudicots
- Clade: Asterids
- Order: Asterales
- Family: Asteraceae
- Genus: Oreostemma
- Species: O. peirsonii

Binomial name
- Oreostemma peirsonii (Sharsm.) G.L.Nesom

Synonyms
- Aster peirsonii

= Oreostemma peirsonii =

Species of plant

Oreostemma peirsonii (formerly Aster peirsonii) is a species of flowering plant in the family Asteraceae known by the common names Peirson's aster and Peirson's mountaincrown.

It is endemic to the Sierra Nevada of California, especially around the area where Fresno, Tulare, and Inyo Counties meet. It is a plant of the alpine climate of the high mountain peaks.

== Description ==
Oreostemma peirsonii is a small perennial herb growing from a caudex and taproot. It lies flat on the ground, growing no taller than about 8 centimeters. The leaves are located at the base of the plant and are linear in shape and narrow, growing a few centimeters long. The stem and leaves are mostly hairless and have scattered resin glands.

The inflorescence bears a single flower head lined with green or purplish phyllaries. The head contains many purple ray florets between 1 and 2 centimeters long around a center of yellow disc florets. The fruit is an achene.
