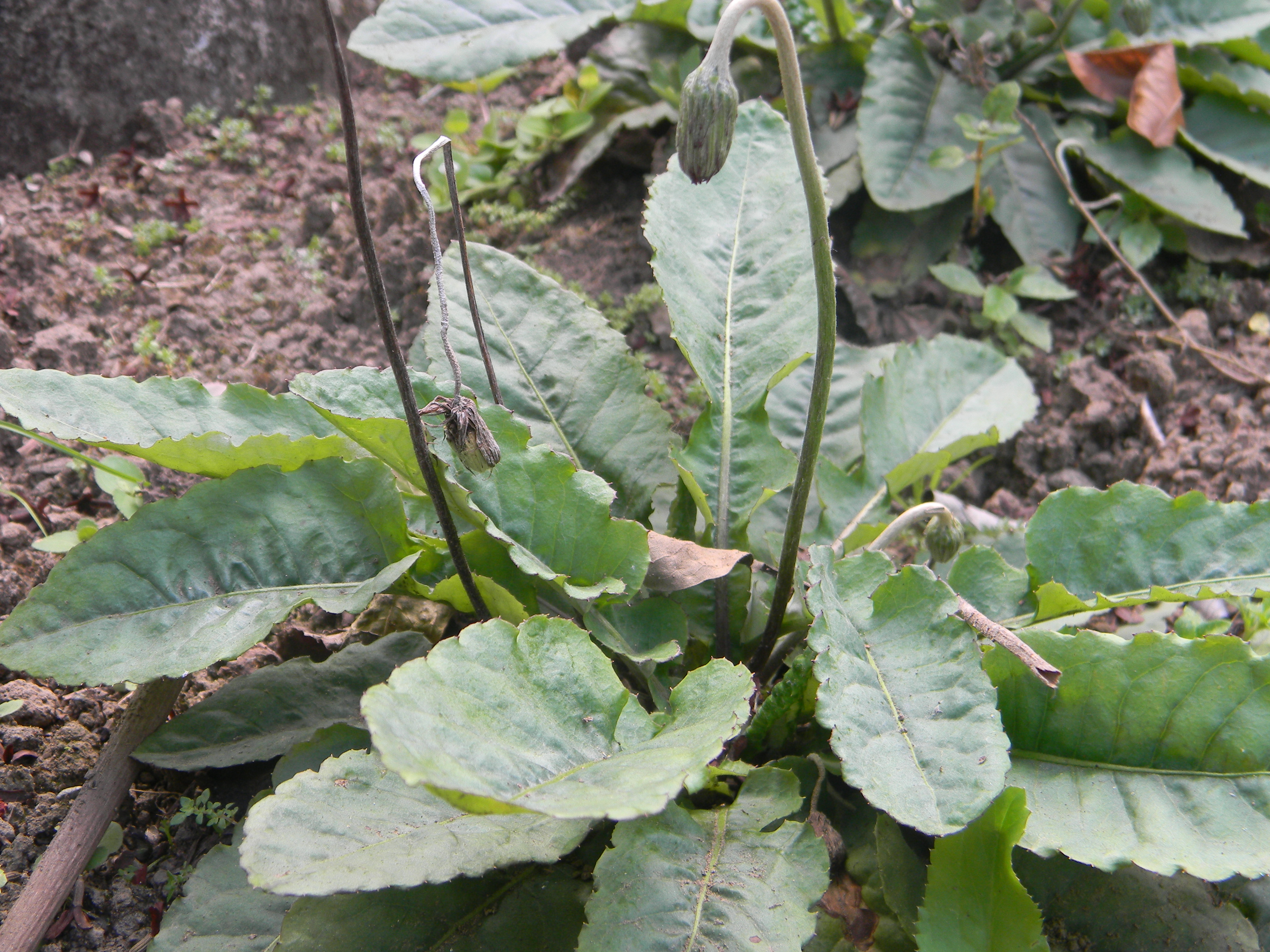
- Chaptalia nutans

Scientific classification
- Kingdom: Plantae
- Clade: Embryophytes
- Clade: Tracheophytes
- Clade: Angiosperms
- Clade: Eudicots
- Clade: Asterids
- Order: Asterales
- Family: Asteraceae
- Subfamily: Mutisioideae
- Tribe: Mutisieae
- Genus: Chaptalia; Ventenat

Type species
- Chaptalia tomentosa Vent.

Synonyms
- Synonymy: Thyrsanthema Neck.; Chaptalia sect. Lieberkuhna (Cass.) Burkart; Loxodon Cass.; Oxydon Less.; Leria DC.; Oxyodon DC.; Chaptalia sect. Microchaptalia Burkart; Lieberkuhna Cass.

= Chaptalia =

Genus of flowering plants

Chaptalia is a genus of flowering plants in the family Asteraceae.

Chaptalia is native primarily to Mesoamerica, South America, and the West Indies, with a few species in the United States.

Species

- Chaptalia albicans (Sw.) Vent. ex B.D.Jacks.
- Chaptalia angustata Urb.
- Chaptalia anisobasis S.F.Blake
- Chaptalia araneosa Casar.
- Chaptalia arechavaletae Arechav.
- Chaptalia azuensis Urb. & Ekman
- Chaptalia callacallensis Cuatrec.
- Chaptalia chapadensis D.J.N.Hind
- Chaptalia cipoensis Roque
- Chaptalia comptonioides Britton & P.Wilson
- Chaptalia cordata Hieron.
- Chaptalia cordifolia (Baker) Cabrera
- Chaptalia crassiuscula Urb.
- Chaptalia crispata Urb. & Ekman
- Chaptalia dentata (L.) Cass.
- Chaptalia denticellata Urb. & Ekman
- Chaptalia denticulata (Baker) Zardini
- Chaptalia diversifolia Greene
- Chaptalia dolichopoda Urb. & Ekman
- Chaptalia eggersii Urb.
- Chaptalia ekmanii Urb.
- Chaptalia erosa Greene
- Chaptalia estribensis G.L.Nesom
- Chaptalia exscapa (Pers.) Baker
- Chaptalia flavicans Urb. & Ekman
- Chaptalia graminifolia (Dusén ex Dusén) Cabrera
- Chaptalia hermogenis M.D.Moraes
- Chaptalia hidalgoensis L.Cabrera & G.L.Nesom
- Chaptalia hintonii Bullock
- Chaptalia hololeuca Greene
- Chaptalia ignota Burkart
- Chaptalia incana Cuatrec.
- Chaptalia integerrima (Vell.) Burkart
- Chaptalia isernina Cuatrec.
- Chaptalia latipes Urb. & Ekman
- Chaptalia leptophylla Urb.
- Chaptalia lyratifolia Burkart
- Chaptalia madrensis G.L.Nesom
- Chaptalia malcabalensis Cuatrec.
- Chaptalia mandonii (Sch.Bip.) Sch.Bip. ex Burkart
- Chaptalia martii (Baker) Zardini
- Chaptalia media (Griseb.) Urb.
- Chaptalia membranacea Urb.
- Chaptalia meridensis S.F.Blake
- Chaptalia modesta Burkart
- Chaptalia montana Britton
- Chaptalia mornicola Urb. & Ekman
- Chaptalia nipensis Urb.
- Chaptalia nutans (L.) Polák
- Chaptalia oblonga D.Don
- Chaptalia paramensis Cuatrec.
- Chaptalia piloselloides (Vahl) Baker
- Chaptalia pringlei Greene
- Chaptalia pumila (Sw.) Urb.
- Chaptalia rocana Britton & P.Wilson
- Chaptalia rotundifolia D.Don
- Chaptalia runcinata Kunth
- Chaptalia shaferi Britton & P.Wilson
- Chaptalia similis R.E.Fr.
- Chaptalia sinuata (Less.) Vent. ex Steud.
- Chaptalia spathulata (D.Don) Hemsl.
- Chaptalia stenocephala (Griseb.) Urb.
- Chaptalia stuebelii Hieron.
- Chaptalia texana Greene
- Chaptalia tomentosa Vent.
- Chaptalia transiliens G.L.Nesom
- Chaptalia turquinensis Borhidi & O.Muñiz
- Chaptalia undulata Urb. & Ekman
- Chaptalia vegaensis Urb. & Ekman
