= Santiago Round Table =

1972 Latin American museums report

Declaración de la Mesa de Santiago de Chile
- Presented: May 31, 1972

The Declaración de la Mesa de Santiago de Chile (Declaration of the Santiago de Chile Round table), also known as the Mesa de Santiago or Mesa de Santiago de Chile (Santiago de Chile, May 31, 1972), was the final report agreed upon by the countries participating in the round table entitled "The development and role of museums in the contemporary world," convened by United Nations Educational, Scientific and Cultural Organization (UNESCO) and the International Council of Museums (ICOM). It is considered a historical milestone in the way museums are conceptualized in Latin America.

The convening of this round table was decided at the XVI UNESCO Meeting in 1970 and was informed by the UNESCO International Symposium in Paris in 1969. It took place between May 20 and 31, 1972, under the direction of the Uruguayan astronomer Héctor Fernández Guido, during the Santiago Conference, organized by UNESCO. Various museums and institutions were convened, such as the Organization of American States, the Museo de La Plata of Argentina, the National Museum of Art of Bolivia, Instituto do Patrimonio Histórico e Artístico Nacional MEC of Brazil, the Regional Museum of the Catholic University of the North, the Directorate of Primary and Normal Education, the Benjamín Vicuña Mackenna Museum, the National Center of Museology, the Museo de La Serena, National Directorate of Tourism, the National Library and the National Museum of Natural History of Chile, National Museum of Costa Rica, Colombian Institute of Culture (Colombia), the Museum of the Central Bank of Ecuador, the General Directorate of Culture of El Salvador, and l Institute of Anthropology and History of Guatemala, the National Museum of Anthropology of Mexico, the Directorate of National Historical Heritage of Panama, the Center for Conservation of Cultural Heritage of the Nation of Peru and the Surveyor Germán Barbato Municipal Planetarium, of Uruguay.

During the table, the social and educational role of museums in their communities was considered, and the creation of the Latin American Association of Museology (ALAM) was resolved. Museology in Latin America took the form of the Integral Museum, where museums serve as a space for contact between society, nature, and culture.

That museums are permanent institutions at the service of society that acquire, communicate and, above all, everything, expose, for purposes of study, education, enjoyment and culture, representative testimonies of the evolution of nature and man.

The resolutions of the Table experienced slow adoption, hampered by a series of coups d'état in the region during the following decade, particularly the one in Chile a year after the resolution.
