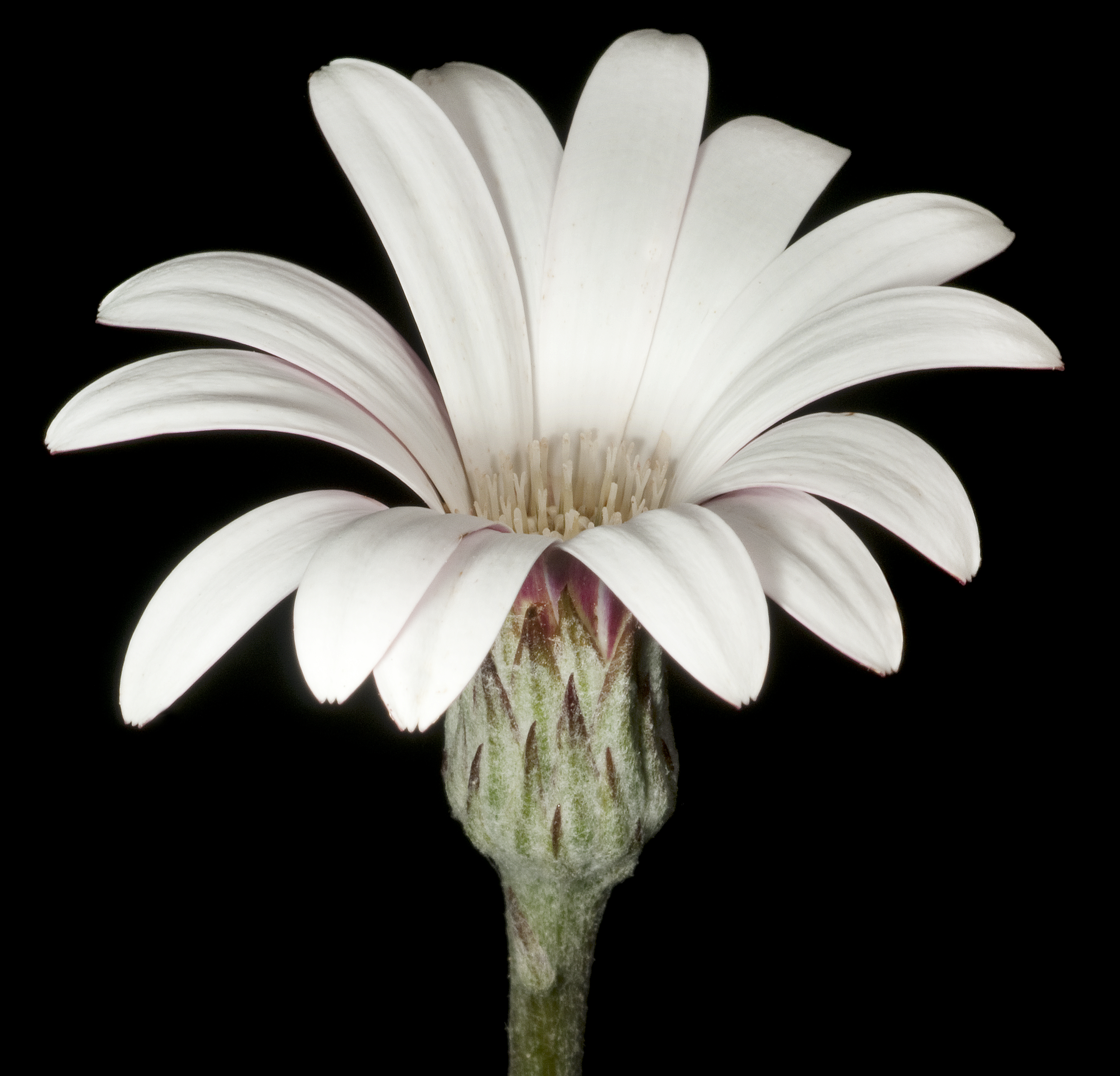

Scientific classification
- Kingdom: Plantae
- Clade: Embryophytes
- Clade: Tracheophytes
- Clade: Spermatophytes
- Clade: Angiosperms
- Clade: Eudicots
- Clade: Asterids
- Order: Asterales
- Family: Asteraceae
- Genus: Amblysperma; Benth.
- Species: A. spathulata

Binomial name
- Amblysperma spathulata (A.Cunn ex DC.) D.J.N.Hind

Synonyms
- Amblysperma minor Keighery; Amblysperma scapigera Benth.; Celmisia spathulata A.Cunn. ex DC.; Trichocline scapigera F.Muell.; Trichocline spathulata (A.Cunn. ex DC.) J.H.Willis

= Amblysperma =

Species of plant

Amblysperma is a genus of flowering plants in the family Asteraceae. It contains a single species, Amblysperma spathulata, common name native gerbera, which is native to the south-west of Western Australia.

The species was first described in 1836 by Allan Cunningham as Celmisia spathulata. The species epithet, spathulata, is a Latin adjective describing some part of the plant as being spoon-shaped. Genus Amblysperma was described by George Bentham in 1837, in which he placed the species Amblysperma scapigera. In 1882 Ferdinand von Mueller placed A. scapigera in genus Trichocline as T. scapigera. In 1967 James Hamlyn Willis transferred A. spathulata to Trichocline as T. spathulata, and T. scapigera was synonymized with T. spathulata. In 2001 David John Nicholas Hind concluded that T. spathulata was distinct from the other species in Trichocline, and placed the species in the revived genus Amblysperma as A. spathulata.
