= Oriastrum =

Scientific classification
- Kingdom: Plantae
- Clade: Embryophytes
- Clade: Tracheophytes
- Clade: Angiosperms
- Clade: Eudicots
- Clade: Asterids
- Order: Asterales
- Family: Asteraceae
- Subfamily: Mutisioideae
- Tribe: Mutisieae
- Genus: Oriastrum; Poepp.

Synonyms
- Aldunatea J.Rémy; Egania J.Rémy

Genus of flowering plants

Oriastrum is a genus of plants in the family Asteraceae, found in western South America (northwest Argentina, Bolivia, Chile, and Peru). It is placed in the tribe Mutisieae.

== Species ==
As of May 2024, Plants of the World Online accepted the following species:

- Oriastrum acerosum (J.Rémy) Phil.
- Oriastrum achenohirsutum (Tombesi) A.M.R.Davies
- Oriastrum apiculatum (J.Rémy) A.M.R.Davies
- Oriastrum dioicum (J.Rémy) Phil.
- Oriastrum famatinae A.M.R.Davies
- Oriastrum gnaphalioides Wedd.
- Oriastrum lycopodioides Wedd.
- Oriastrum minutum (Phil.) Nicola, S.E.Freire & Ariza
- Oriastrum pentacaenoides Phil.
- Oriastrum polymallum Phil.
- Oriastrum pulvinatum Phil.
- Oriastrum pusillum Poepp.
- Oriastrum revolutum (Phil.) A.M.R.Davies
- Oriastrum stuebelii (Hieron.) A.M.R.Davies
- Oriastrum tarapacensis A.M.R.Davies
- Oriastrum tontalensis A.M.R.Davies
- Oriastrum werdermannii A.M.R.Davies
