= Oreoseris =

Scientific classification
- Kingdom: Plantae
- Clade: Tracheophytes
- Clade: Angiosperms
- Clade: Eudicots
- Clade: Asterids
- Order: Asterales
- Family: Asteraceae
- Subfamily: Mutisioideae
- Tribe: Mutisieae
- Genus: Oreoseris; DC.

Species
- See text

Synonyms
- Berniera DC.; Uechtritzia Freyn

Genus of Asteraceae plants

Oreoseris is a genus of flowering plants in the family Asteraceae, native to Anatolia, Central Asia, the Himalaya region, and Thailand. Originally described in 1838, it was resurrected with the Asian species of Gerbera and all the species of Uechtritzia in 2018.

== Species ==
The following species are accepted:

- Oreoseris armena (Freyn & Sint.) V.A.Funk & J.Wen
- Oreoseris delavayi (Franch.) X.D.Xu & W.Zheng
- Oreoseris gossypina (Royle) X.D.Xu & V.A.Funk
- Oreoseris henryi (Dunn) W.Zheng & J.Wen
- Oreoseris kokanica (Regel & Schmalh.) J.Wen & W.Zheng
- Oreoseris lacei (G.Watt) V.A.Funk & W.Zheng
- Oreoseris latiligulata (Y.C.Tseng) W.Zheng & J.Wen
- Oreoseris maxima (D.Don) X.D.Xu & W.Zheng
- Oreoseris nivea DC.
- Oreoseris raphanifolia (Franch.) V.A.Funk & J.Wen
- Oreoseris rupicola (T.G.Gao & D.J.N.Hind) X.D.Xu & V.A.Funk
- Oreoseris tanantii (Franch.) W.Zheng & X.D.Xu
