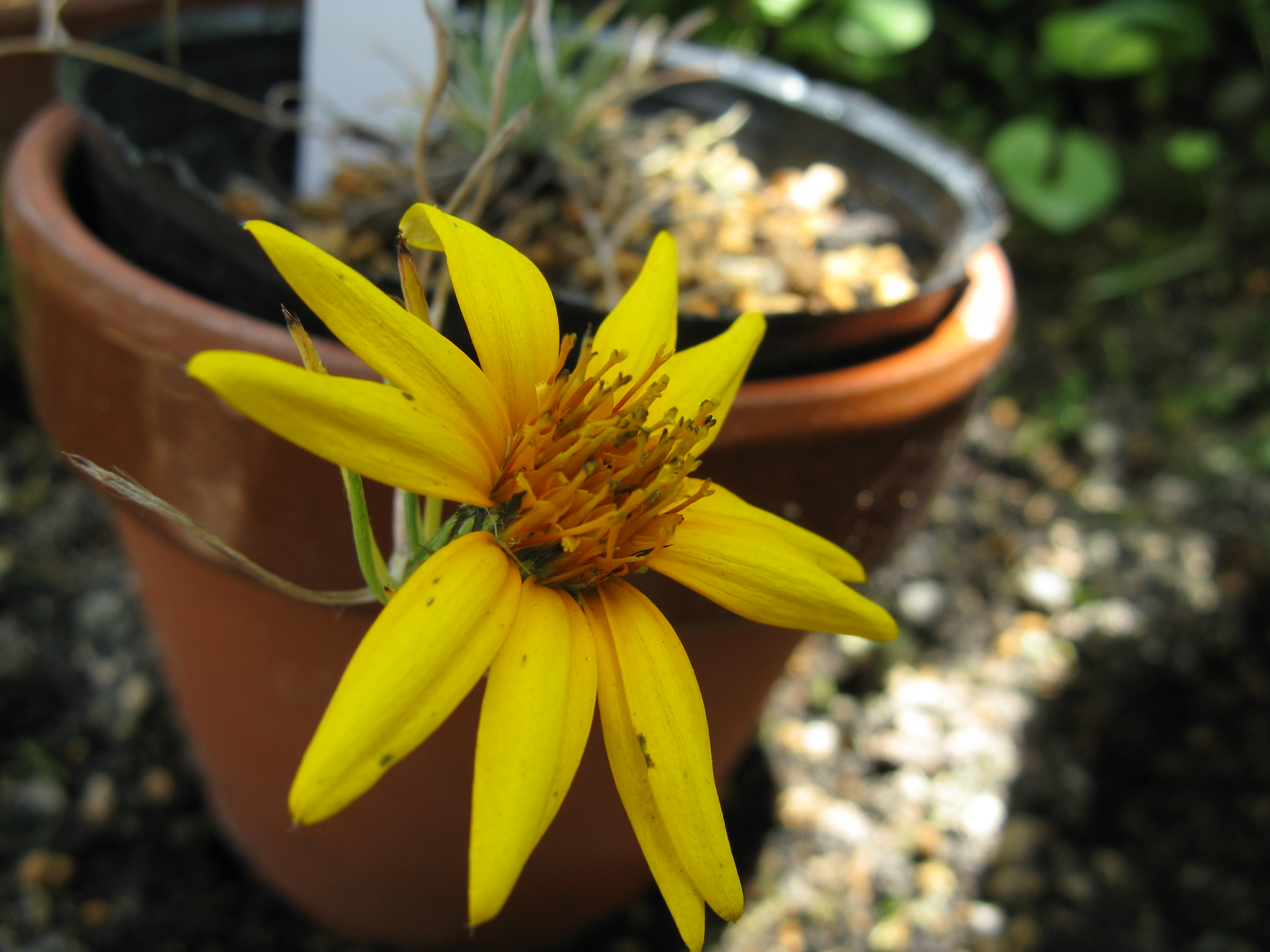
- Chaetanthera chilensis

Scientific classification
- Kingdom: Plantae
- Clade: Embryophytes
- Clade: Tracheophytes
- Clade: Angiosperms
- Clade: Eudicots
- Clade: Asterids
- Order: Asterales
- Family: Asteraceae
- Subfamily: Mutisioideae
- Tribe: Mutisieae
- Genus: Chaetanthera; Ruiz & Pav.

Type species
- Chaetanthera ciliata Ruiz & Pav.

Synonyms
- Chondrochilus Phil.; Cherina Cass.; Luciliopsis Wedd.; Euthrixia D.Don; Carmelita Gay ex DC.; Elachia DC.; Egania J.Rémy; Aldunatea J.Rémy

= Chaetanthera =

Genus of flowering plants

Chaetanthera is a genus of South American flowering plants in the family Asteraceae native to Argentina, Bolivia, Chile, and Peru.

== Description ==
Chaetanthera are annual or perennial plants, or dwarf shrubs.

== Taxonomy ==
It was published by Hipólito Ruiz López and José Antonio Pavón Jiménez in 1794. The lectotype Chaetanthera ciliata Ruiz & Pav. was designated in 1971.

=== Species ===
It has the following species:

- Chaetanthera acerosa
- Chaetanthera acheno-hirsuta
- Chaetanthera apiculata
- Chaetanthera australis
- Chaetanthera boliviensis
- Chaetanthera brachylepis
- Chaetanthera chilensis
- Chaetanthera chiquianensis
- Chaetanthera ciliata
- Chaetanthera cochlearifolia
- Chaetanthera delicatula
- Chaetanthera dioica
- Chaetanthera elegans
- Chaetanthera eryngioides
- Chaetanthera euphrasioides
- Chaetanthera flabellata
- Chaetanthera flabellifolia
- Chaetanthera floccosa
- Chaetanthera glabrata
- Chaetanthera glandulosa
- Chaetanthera gnaphalioides
- Chaetanthera incana
- Chaetanthera kalinii
- Chaetanthera lanata
- Chaetanthera leptocephala
- Chaetanthera limbata
- Chaetanthera linearis
- Chaetanthera lycopodioides
- Chaetanthera microphylla
- Chaetanthera minuta
- Chaetanthera moenchioides
- Chaetanthera pentacaenoides
- Chaetanthera perpusilla
- Chaetanthera peruviana
- Chaetanthera planiseta
- Chaetanthera polymalla
- Chaetanthera pulvinata
- Chaetanthera pusilla
- Chaetanthera renifolia
- Chaetanthera revoluta
- Chaetanthera serrata
- Chaetanthera spathulata
- Chaetanthera sphaeroidalis
- Chaetanthera splendens
- Chaetanthera stuebelii
- Chaetanthera tenella
- Chaetanthera valdiviana
- Chaetanthera villosa

== Distribution ==
It is native to Argentina, Bolivia, Chile, and Peru. The centre of its distribution is in Chile, which is home to 18 endemic species.
