= List of lyrate plants =

The following plants have leaves that are lyrate:

- Arabidopsis lyrata
- Berlandiera lyrata
- Ficus lyrata
- Leibnitzia lyrata
- Paysonia lyrata
- Quercus lyrata
- Salvia lyrata
- Saussurea costus
