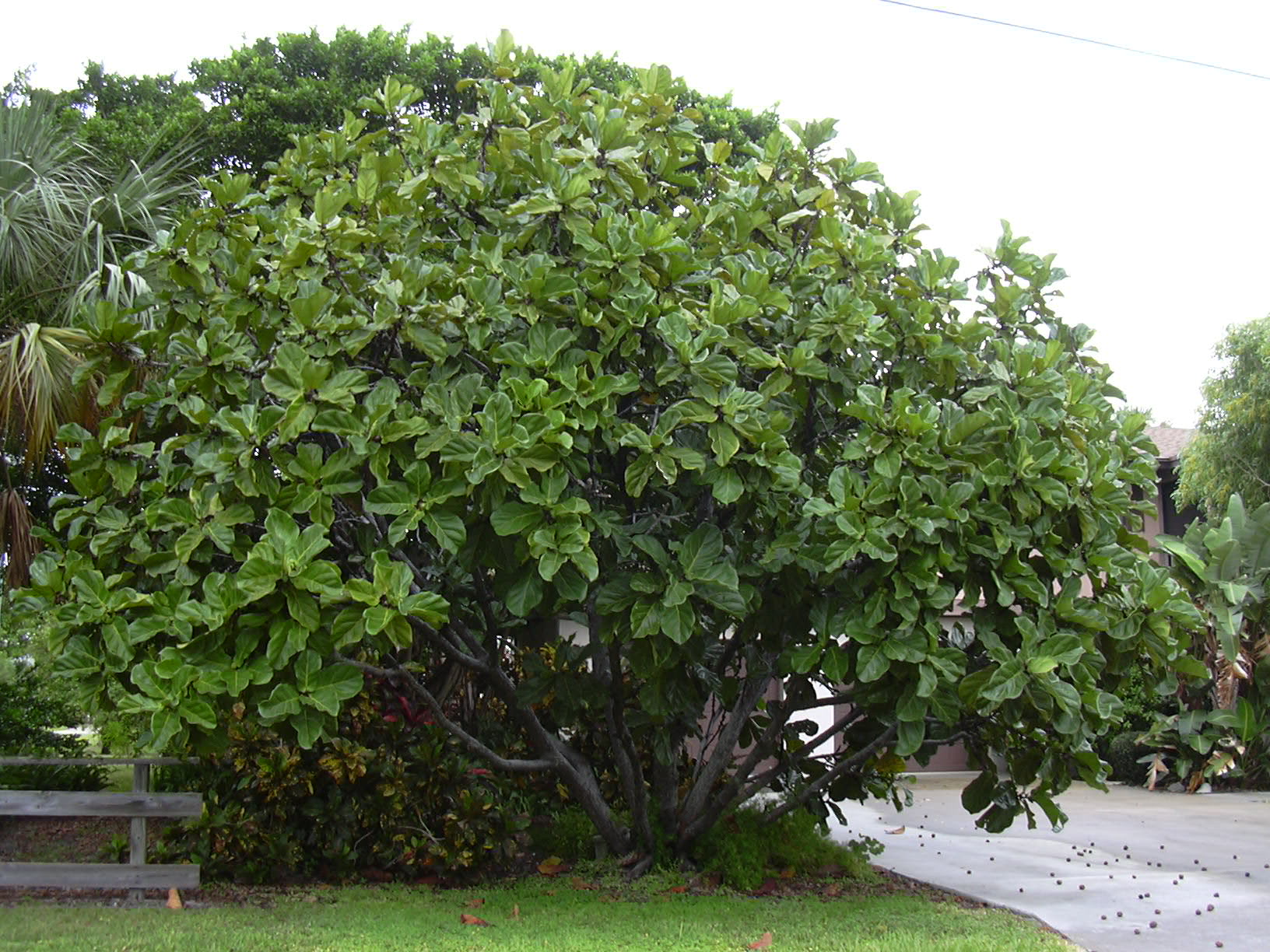

Conservation status
- Least Concern (IUCN 3.1)

Scientific classification
- Kingdom: Plantae
- Clade: Tracheophytes
- Clade: Angiosperms
- Clade: Eudicots
- Clade: Rosids
- Order: Rosales
- Family: Moraceae
- Genus: Ficus
- Subgenus: F. subg. Urostigma
- Species: F. lyrata

Binomial name
- Ficus lyrata Warb.

Synonyms
- Ficus pandurata Sander, nom. illeg. homonym. post.

= Ficus lyrata =

Species of flowering plant in the fig and mulberry family

Ficus lyrata, commonly known as the fiddle-leaf fig, banjo fig, fiddle-leaved fig tree, lyre leaf fig tree, or lyre-leaved fig tree, is a species of plant in the mulberry and fig family Moraceae. It is native to western Africa, but is cultivated around the world as an ornamental plant. It has received the Royal Horticultural Society's Award of Garden Merit.

== Description ==
Ficus lyrata is an evergreen tree or shrub, native to the tropical rain forests of West and Central Africa, and is one of the most demanding and showy Ficus species. Outdoors, it can grow 9–12 m (30–39 ft) tall.

The leaves are variable in shape, but often with a broad apex and narrow middle, resembling a lyre or fiddle; they are up to 45 cm (18 in) long and 30 cm (12 in) broad (though usually smaller), with a leathery texture, prominent veins and a wavy margin.

The fruit is a green fig 2.5–3 cm (1.0–1.2 in) diameter.

== Distribution and habitat ==
F. lyrata is native to Benin, Cameroon, Gabon, Ghana, Guinea, Guinea-Bissau, Ivory Coast, Liberia, Nigeria, Sierra Leone, and Togo, where it occurs in moist lowland forests. It also occurs as an introduced species in the Canary Islands, El Salvador, and Trinidad and Tobago.

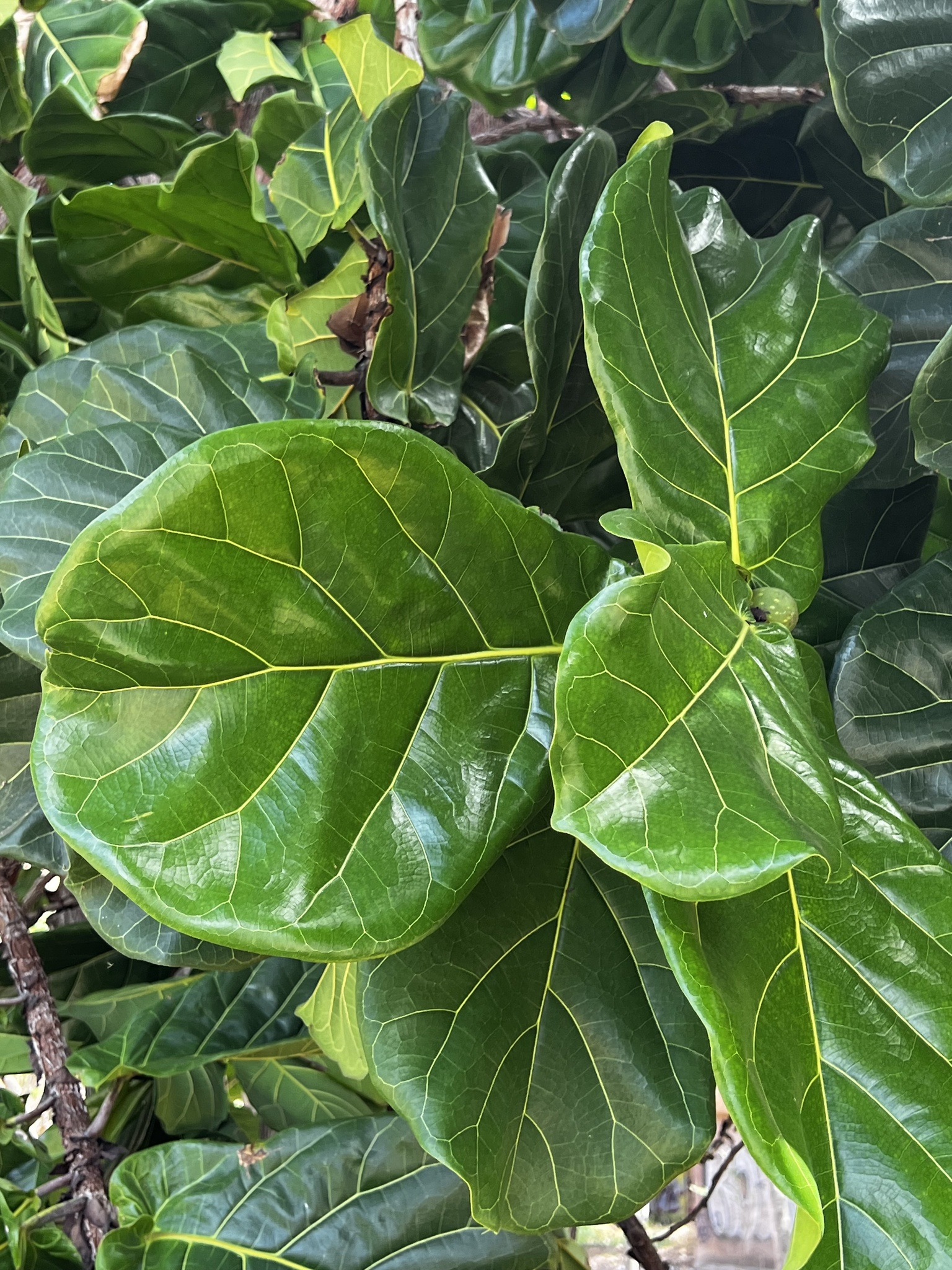
Ficus lyrata leaves are lyrate, meaning that they resemble a lyre.

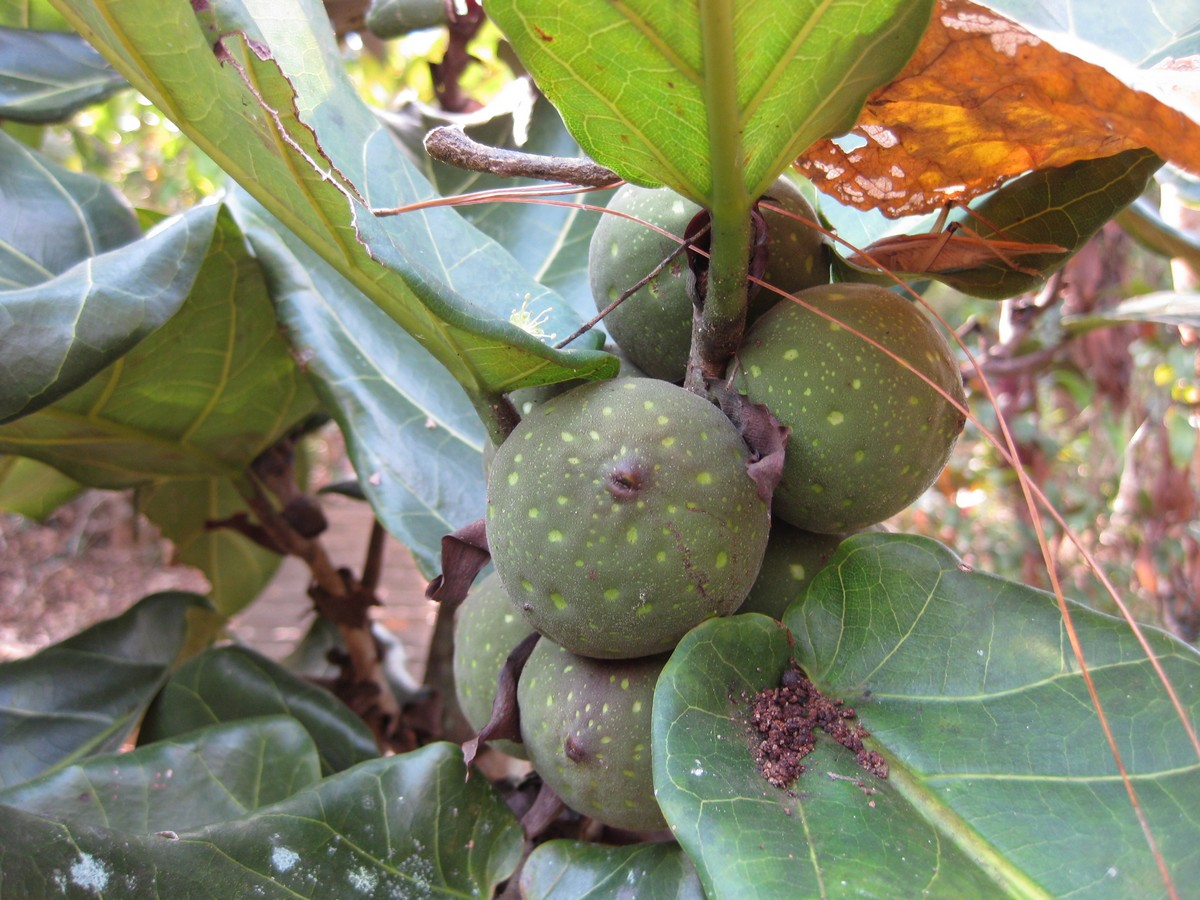
The fruit is a green fig.

== Cultivation ==
It is widely grown outdoors in tropical regions, and also as a decorative species indoors in Europe and North America. During the 2010s, it became increasingly popular as a houseplant and interior design feature. It is a popular ornamental tree in subtropical and tropical gardens, and is also grown as a houseplant in temperate areas, where it usually stays shorter and fails to flower or fruit. It thrives in bright, indirect light and can tolerate some direct sunlight. It is hardy down to 10 °C (50 °F), so specimens may be placed outside during warm periods.

=== Propagation ===
Ficus lyrata can be propagated by division, stem cuttings, or air layering.

== See also ==
- List of lyrate plants
