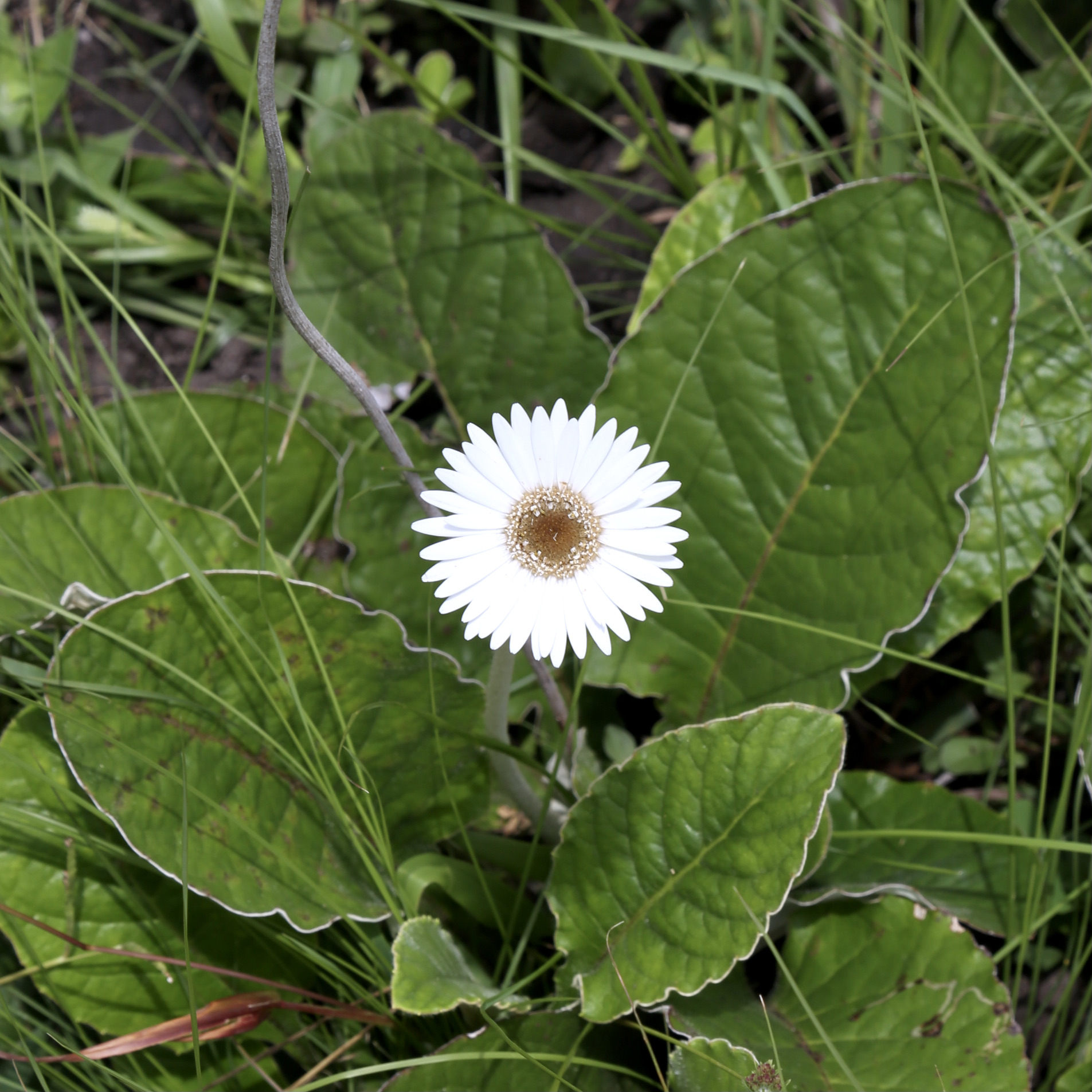
- Gerbera ambigua from Vernon Crookes Nature Reserve, KwaZulu-Natal.

Scientific classification
- Kingdom: Plantae
- Clade: Tracheophytes
- Clade: Angiosperms
- Clade: Eudicots
- Clade: Asterids
- Order: Asterales
- Family: Asteraceae
- Genus: Gerbera
- Species: G. ambigua

Binomial name
- Gerbera ambigua Sch.Bip. (1844)

Synonyms
- Lasiopus ambiguus Cass. (1822); Lasiopus coriaceus DC. (1838); Gerbera kraussii Sch.Bip. (1844); Gerbera coriacea Sch.Bip. (1844); Gerbera nervosa Sond. (1850); Gerbera discolor Sond. ex Harv. (1865); Gerbera elegans Muschl. (1911); Gerbera lynchii Dümmer (1914); Gerbera flava R.E.Fr. (1916); Gerbera welwitschii S.Moore (1916); Gerbera randii S.Moore (1926)

= Gerbera ambigua =

Species of flowering plant

Gerbera ambigua is a species of flowering plant in the section Lasiopus of genus Gerbera belonging to the basal Mutisieae tribe within the large Asteraceae (or Compositae) family.

It is indigenous to Southern Africa and commonly known as the Botterblom or Griekwateebossie in Afrikaans. It was first described by Carl Heinrich "Bipontinus" Schultz in Flora Journal in 1844.

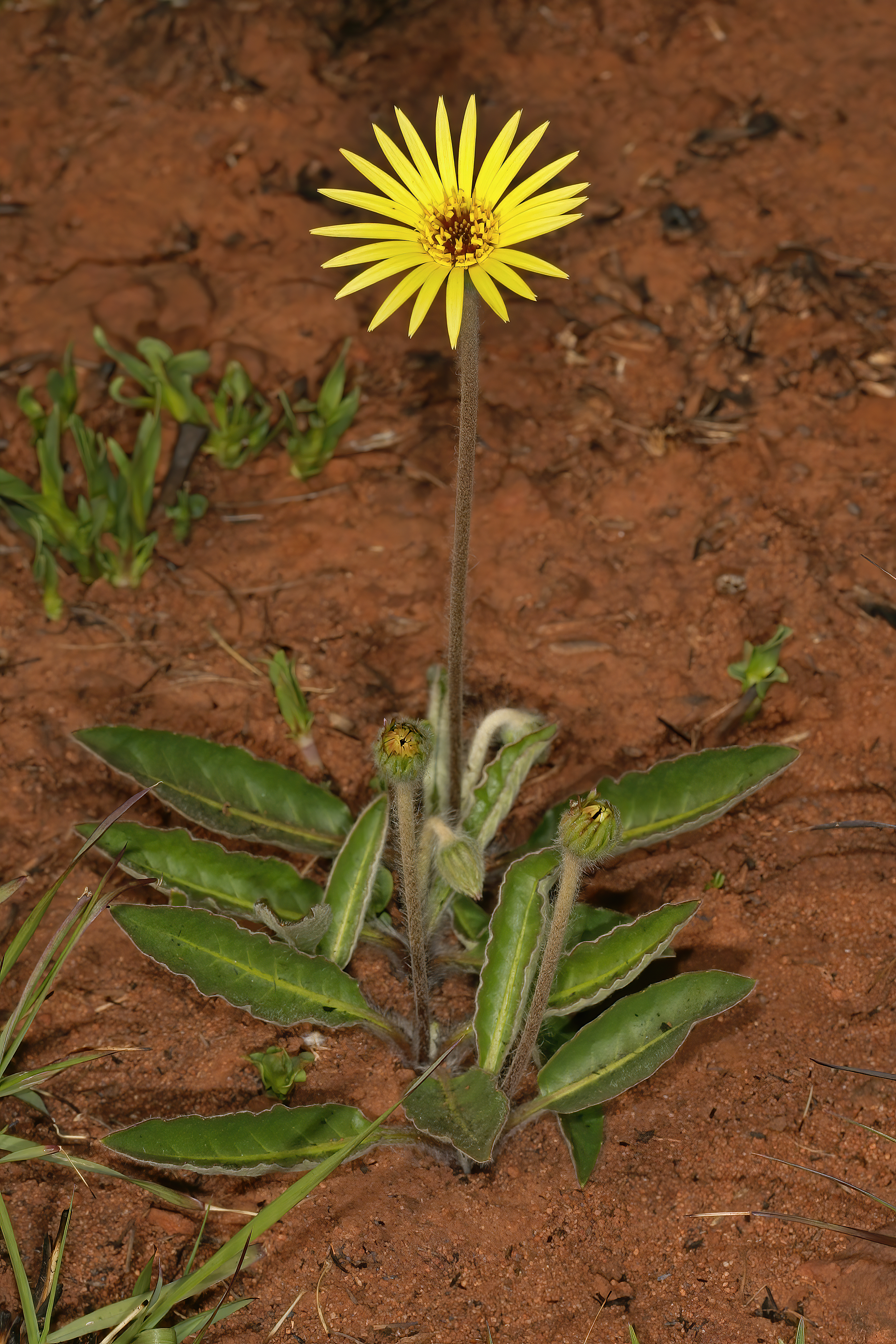
Gerbera ambigua, yellow form

== Etymology ==
The genus was named in honour of German botanist and medical doctor Traugott Gerber (1710 — 1743). The Latin epithet ambigua means "doubtful".

== Description ==
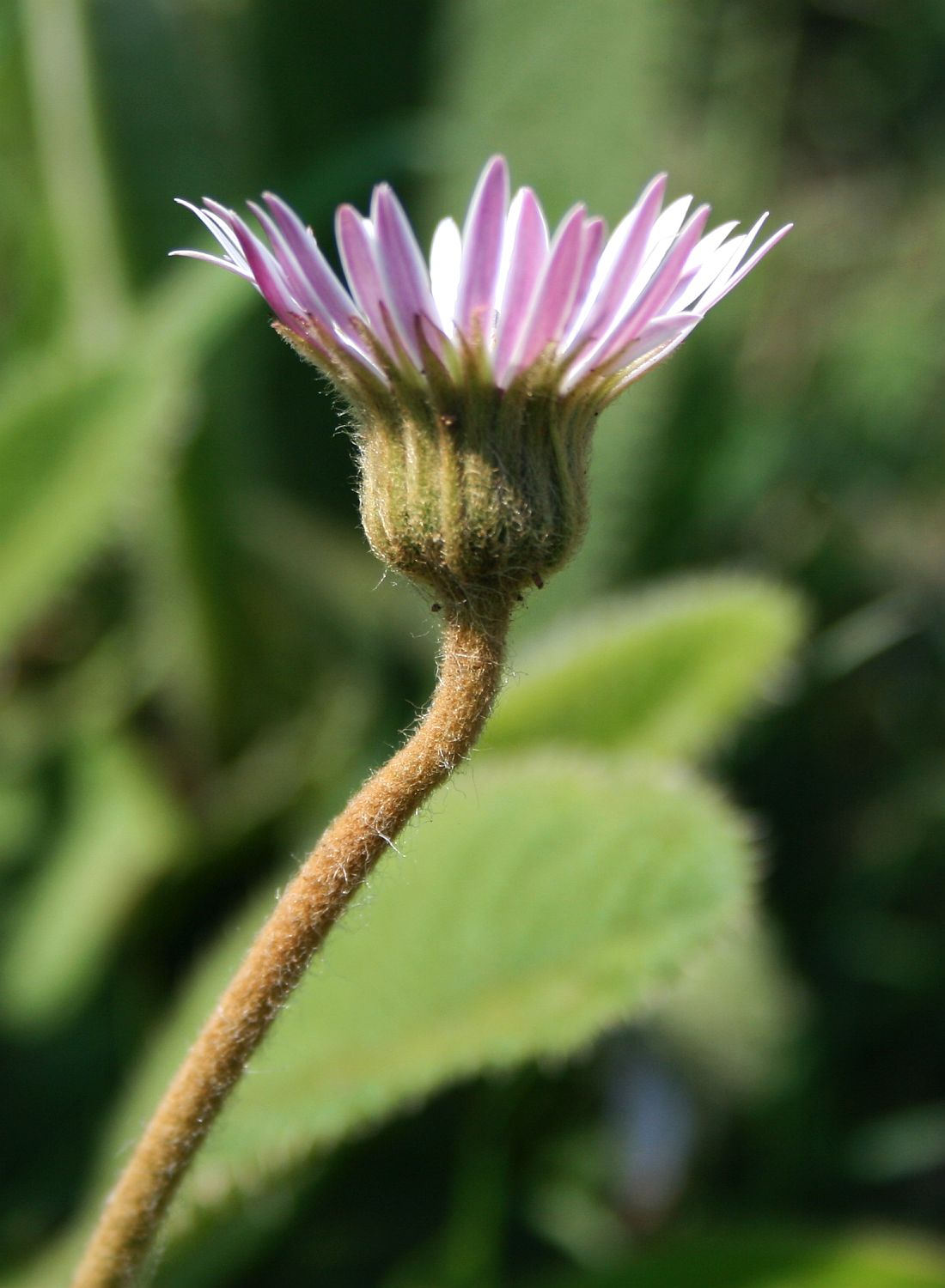
Ray florets are commonly white above and pink beneath

Gerbera ambigua is an acaulescent tufted perennial herb with thickened woody rootstock and naked flowering scapes up to 35 cm high. Leaves are very variable, usually petiolate, elliptical or oblanceolate, 5–8 cm long and 2.5–3.5 cm wide, thinly hairy above and white- or yellow-felted beneath. Flower-heads (capitula) are 2–5 cm in diameter, ray florets are white to yellow abobe and pink to coppery reddish on reverse. It flowers from September to February.

== Distribution ==
Gerbera ambigua grows in grassland and savanna of eastern South Africa, Lesotho, Eswatini and in tropical Southern Africa: Zaire, Angola, Zambia, Malawi, Tanzania, Zimbabwe, Mozambique, Malawi.

== Habitat ==
The species grows from 1500 m to 2600 m above sea level on rocky slopes in woodland. It is able to survive both dry, cold winters and annual fires which are typical of the region in which it is found.

== Ecology ==
The species is pollinated by many different flying insects including beetles which feed on the pollen.
