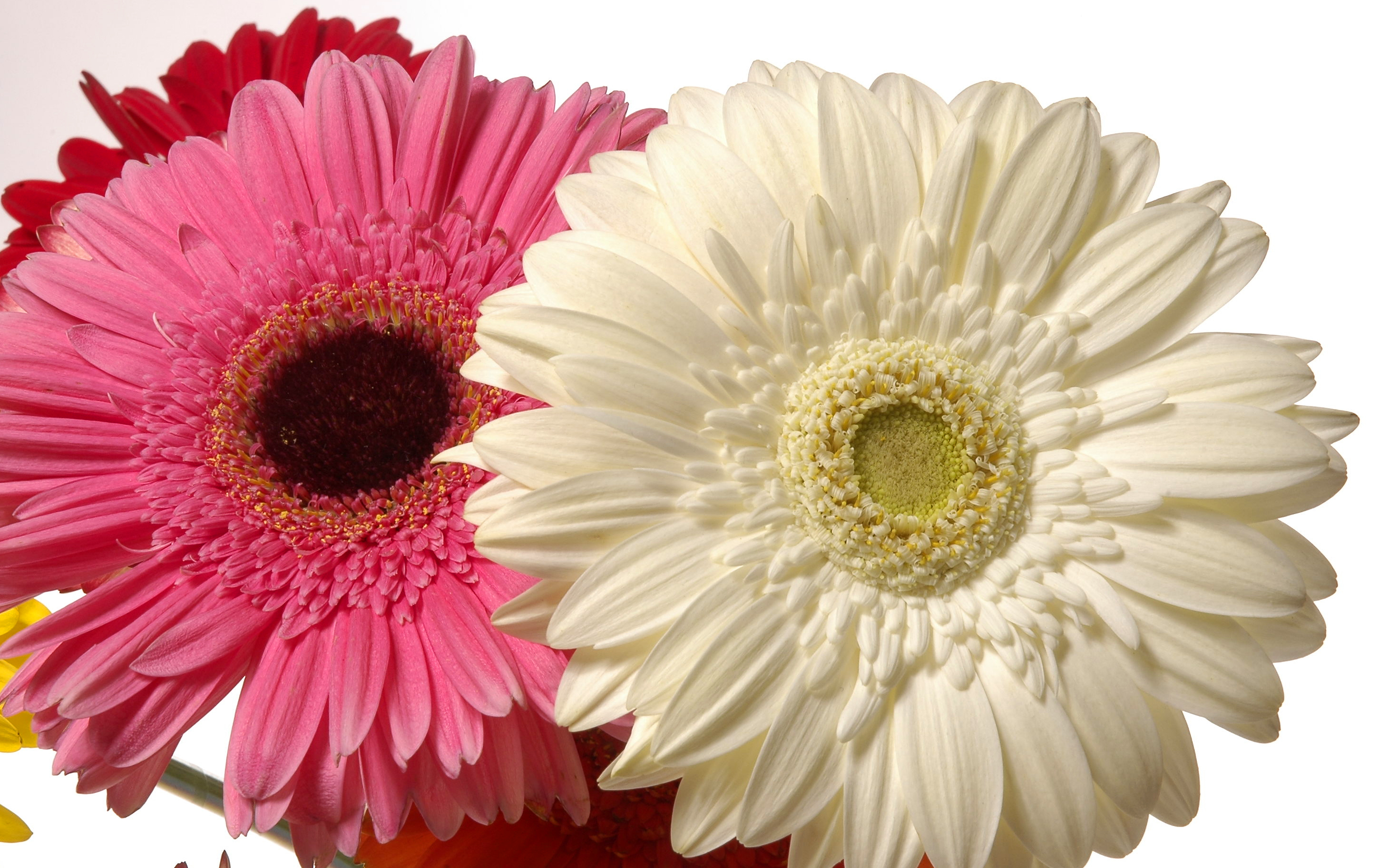
- Gerbera × hybrida

Scientific classification
- Kingdom: Plantae
- Clade: Tracheophytes
- Clade: Angiosperms
- Clade: Eudicots
- Clade: Asterids
- Order: Asterales
- Family: Asteraceae
- Subfamily: Mutisioideae
- Tribe: Mutisieae
- Genus: Gerbera; L. (1758)

Synonyms
- Pseudoseris Baill. (1881); Epiclinastrum Bojer ex DC. (1838); Berniera DC (1838); Lasiopus Cass. (1817); Aphyllocaulon Lag. (1811); Atasites Neck. (1790); Idicium Neck. (1790)

= Gerbera =

Genus of plants

Gerbera (/ˈdʒɜːrbərə/ JUR-bər-ə or /ˈɡɜːrbərə/ GUR-bər-ə) L. is a genus of plants in the Asteraceae (Compositae) family. The first scientific description of a Gerbera was made by J. D. Hooker in Curtis's Botanical Magazine in 1889 when he described Gerbera jamesonii, a South African species also known as Transvaal daisy or Barberton daisy. Gerbera is also commonly known as the African daisy. There are also different colors of gerberas.

== Etymology ==
The genus was named in honour of German botanist and medical doctor Traugott Gerber (1710–1743), who travelled extensively in Russia and was a friend of Carl Linnaeus.

== Description ==
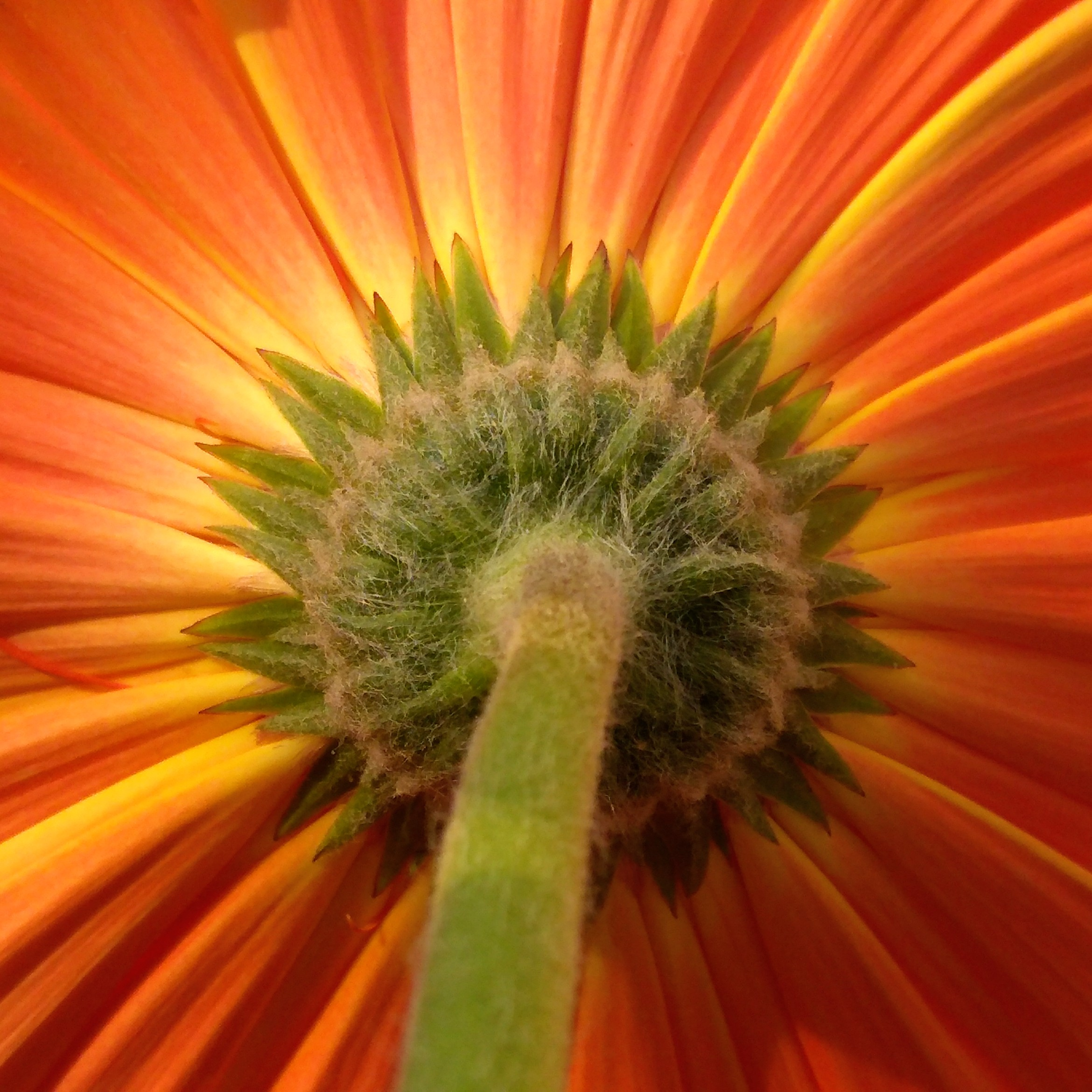
Gerbera involucre

Gerbera species are tufted, caulescent, perennial herbs, often with woolly crown, up to 80 cm high. Leaves are all in rosette, elliptical with entire or toothed margin or lobed, petiolate or with a petaloid base, pinnately veined, often leathery and felted beneath. Single to several flowering stems from each rosette bear bracteate or ebracteate, simple, one-headed inflorescence-capitulum. Capitula are radiate, with several rows of bracts. Ray florets are female, 2-lipped, the outer lip is large and strap-shaped, inner lip consists of two small, thread-like lobes of white, pink or red, rarely yellow colour. Disc florets are fertile, five-lobed and irregularly 2-lipped with curled petals.

=== Species ===
Formerly included numerous species once considered members of Gerbera are now placed in other genera: Chaptalia, Leibnitzia, Mairia, Perdicium, Trichocline, and Oreoseris.

In accordance with International Plant Names Index genus Gerbera includes 22 accepted species:

==== Section Gerbera ====
- Gerbera crocea Kuntze — Dialstee
- Gerbera grandis J.C.Manning & Simka
- Gerbera linnaei Cass. — Varingblom
- Gerbera ovata J.C.Manning & Simka
- Gerbera serrata Druce
- Gerbera tomentosa DC.
- Gerbera wrightii Harv.

==== Section Lasiopus (Cass.) Sch.Bip. ====
- Gerbera ambigua Sch.Bip.
- Gerbera aurantiaca Sch.Bip. — Hilton daisy
- Gerbera galpinii Klatt — Galpin's gerbera
- Gerbera jamesonii Bolus — Barberton daisy, Gerbera daisy, Transvaal daisy
- Gerbera sylvicola Johnson, N.R.Crouch & T.J.Edwards
- Gerbera viridifolia (DC.) Sch.Bip. — Pink gerbera

==== Section Pseudoseris (Baill.) Jeffr. ====
- Gerbera bojeri Sch.Bip. — Bojer's gerbera
- Gerbera diversifolia Humbert
- Gerbera elliptica Humbert
- Gerbera emirnensis Baker
- Gerbera hypochaeridoides Baker
- Gerbera leandrii Humbert
- Gerbera perrieri Humbert
- Gerbera petasitifolia Humbert

==== Section Parva H.V.Hansen ====
- Gerbera parva N.E.Br.
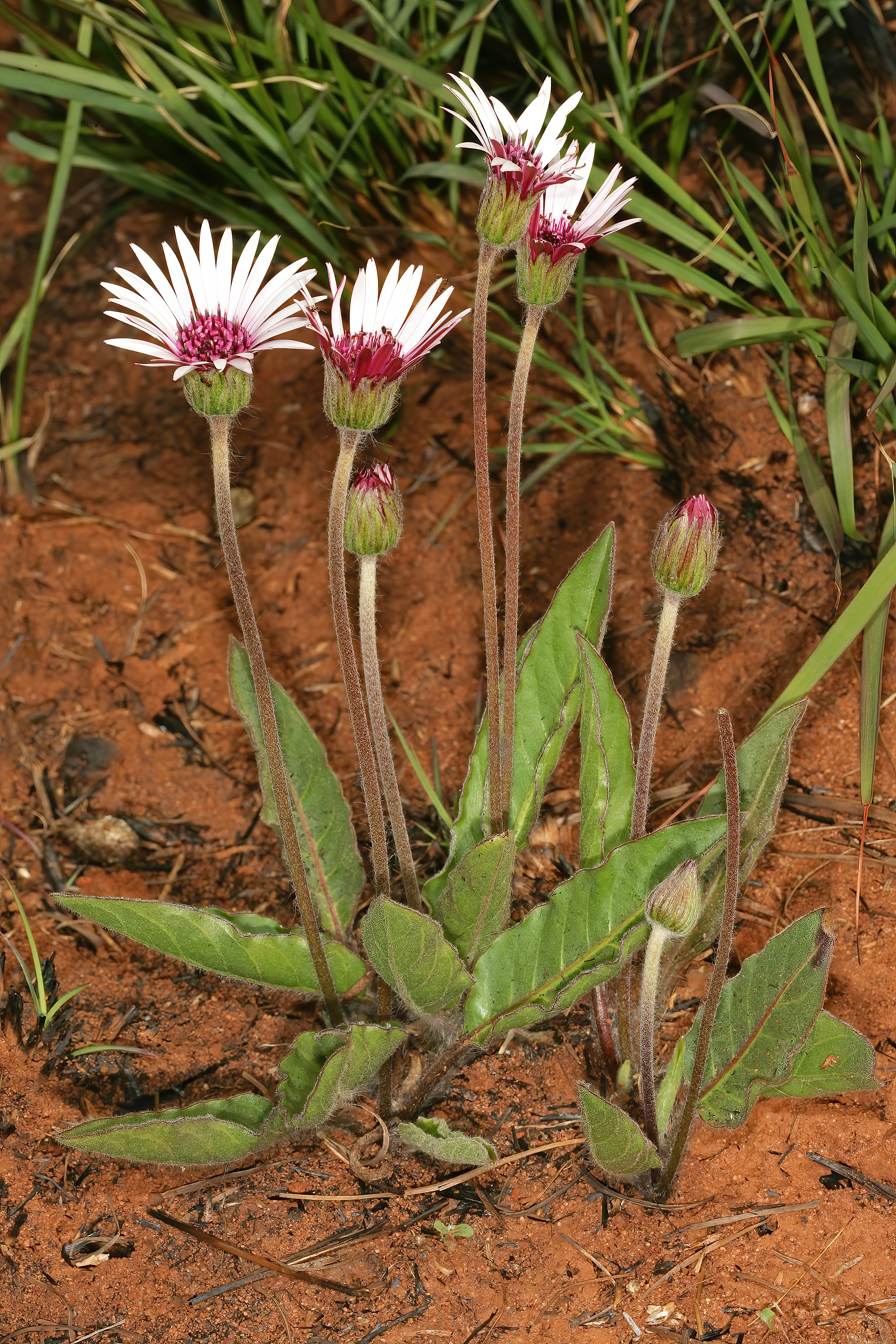
Gerbera viridifolia

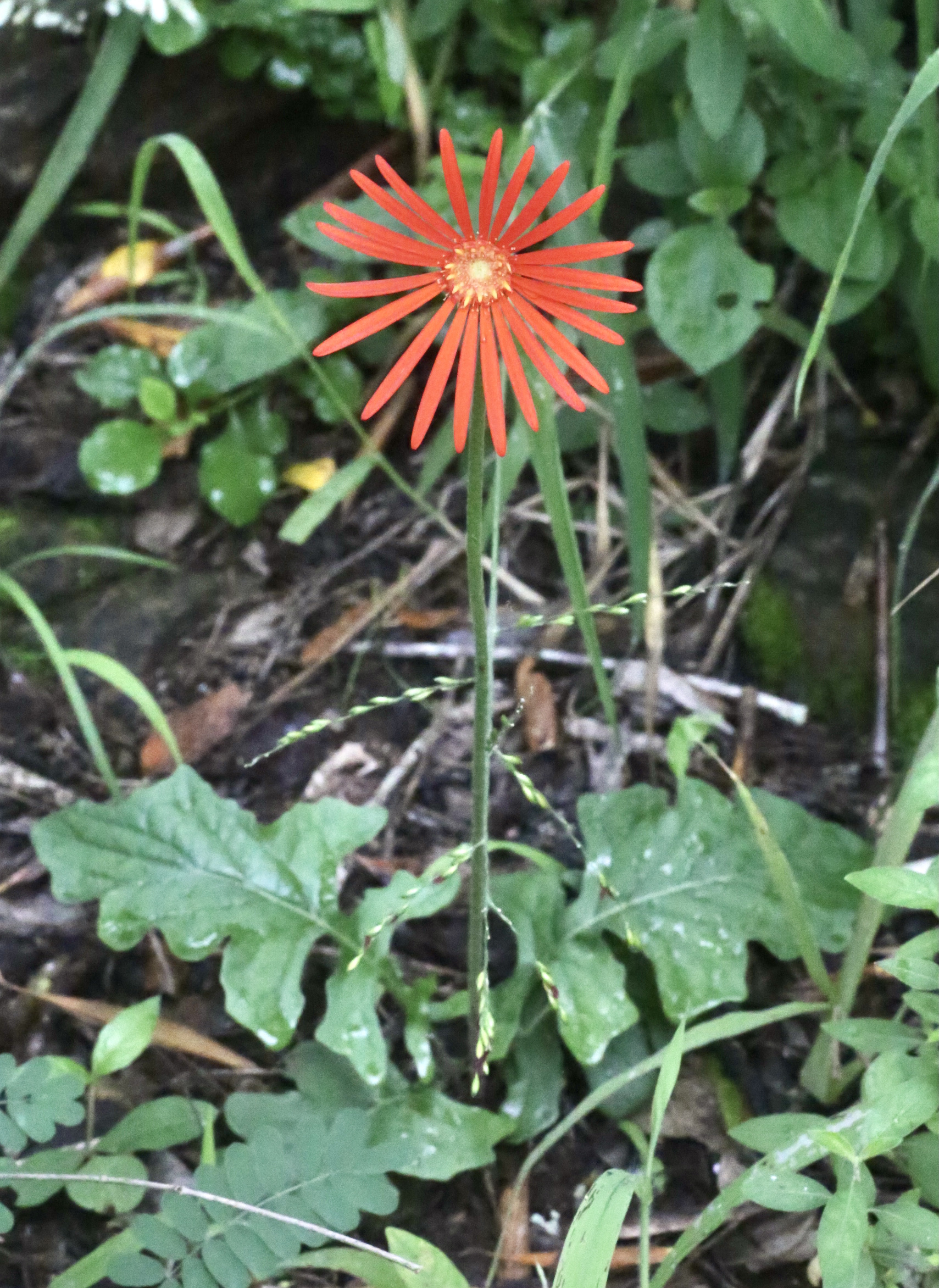
Gerbera jamesonii

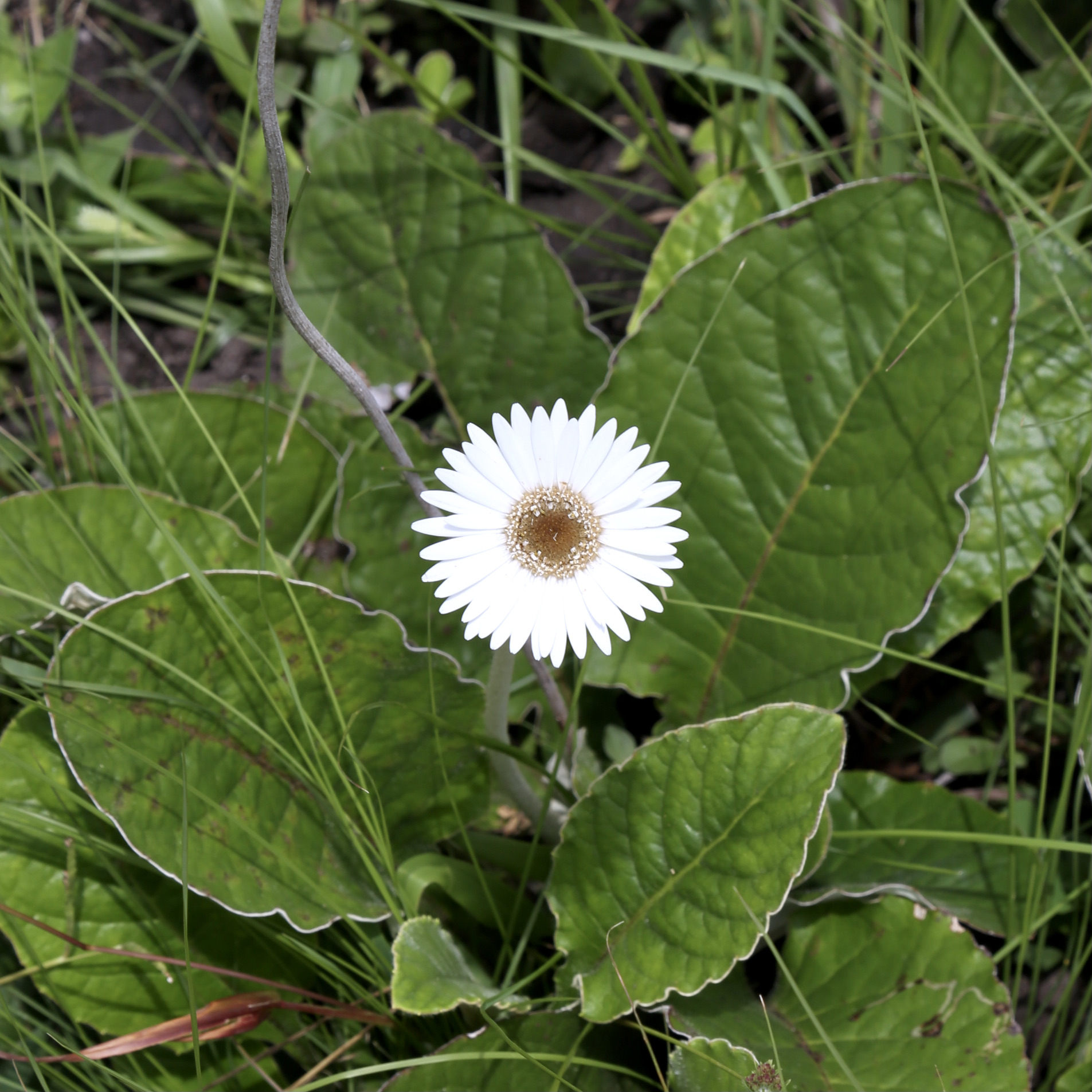
Gerbera ambigua

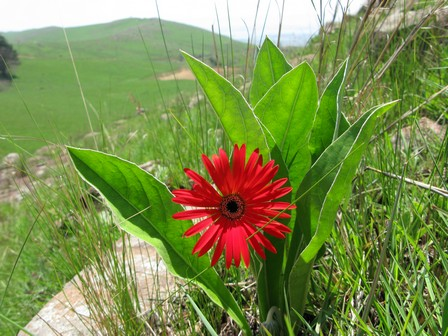
Gerbera aurantiaca

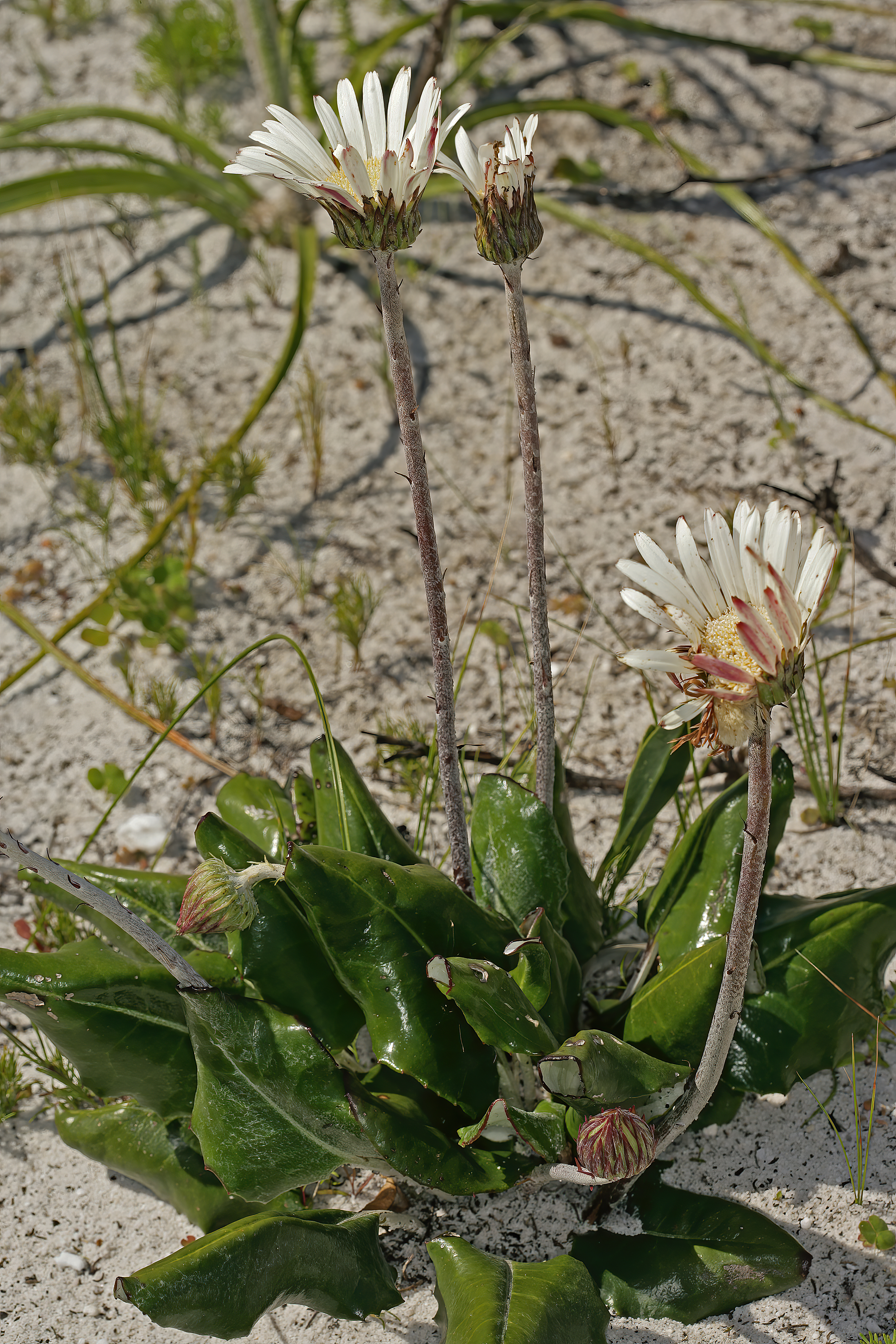
Gerbera wrightii

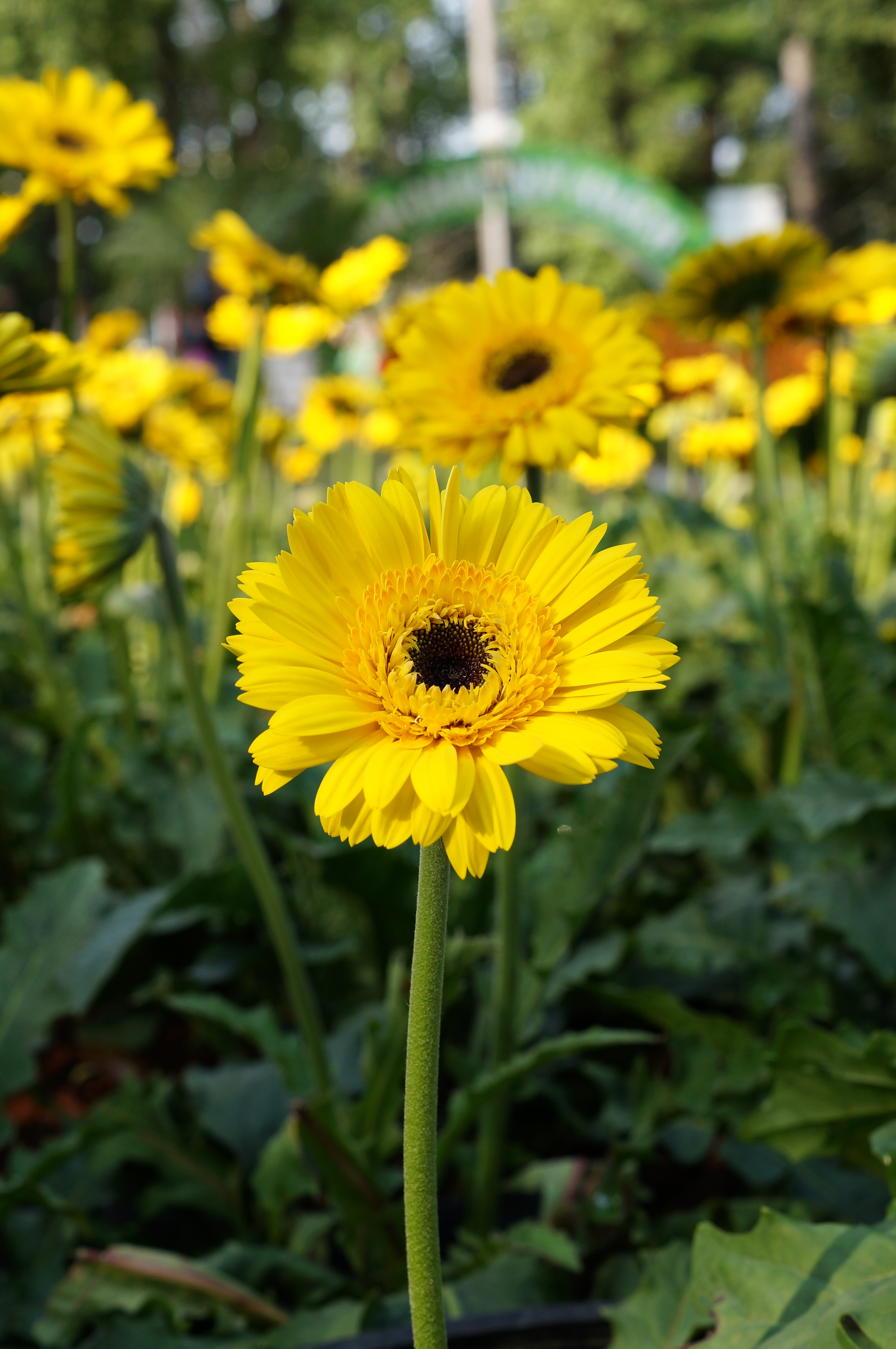
Gerbera × hybrida

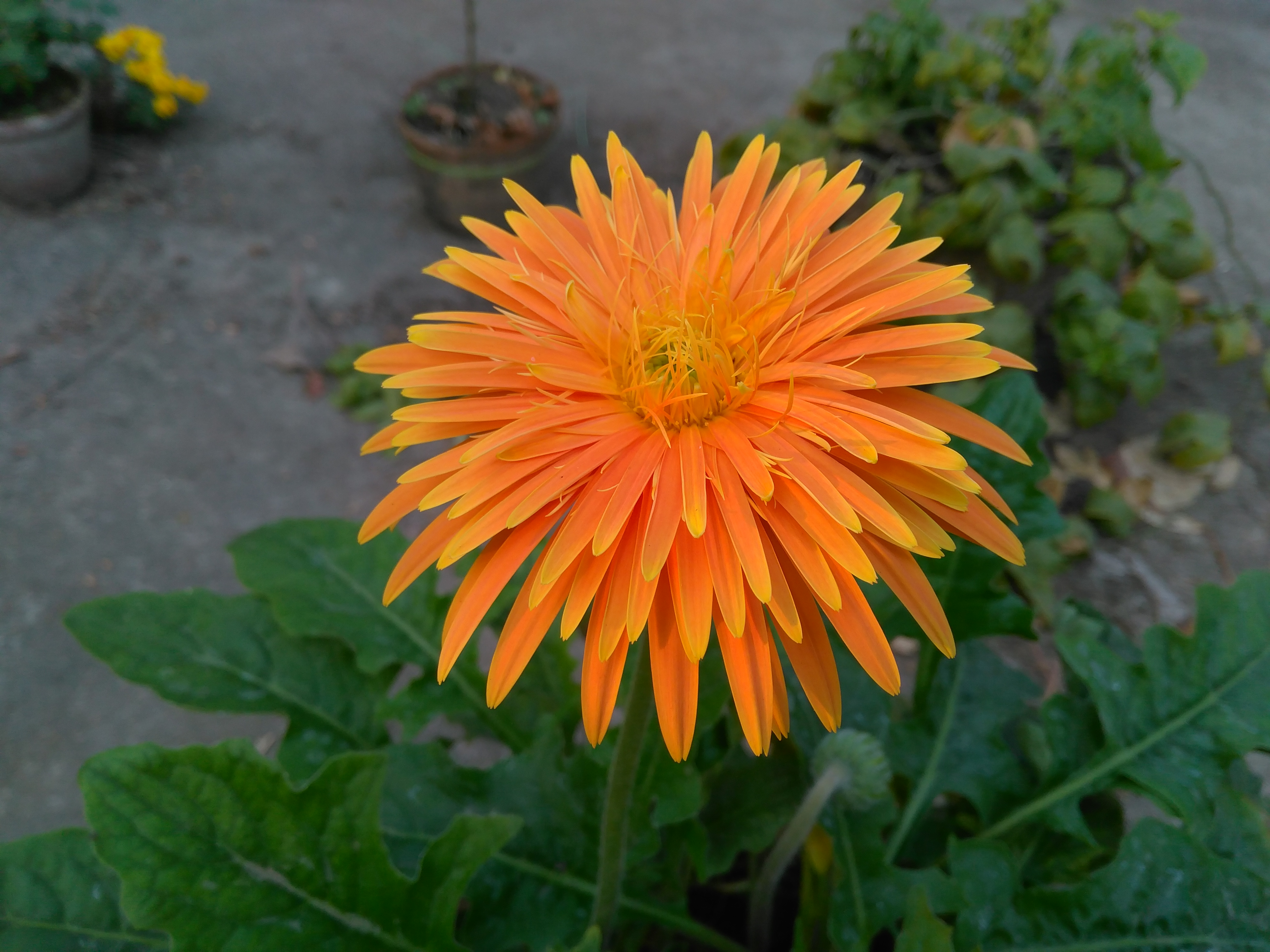
Gerbera × hybrida

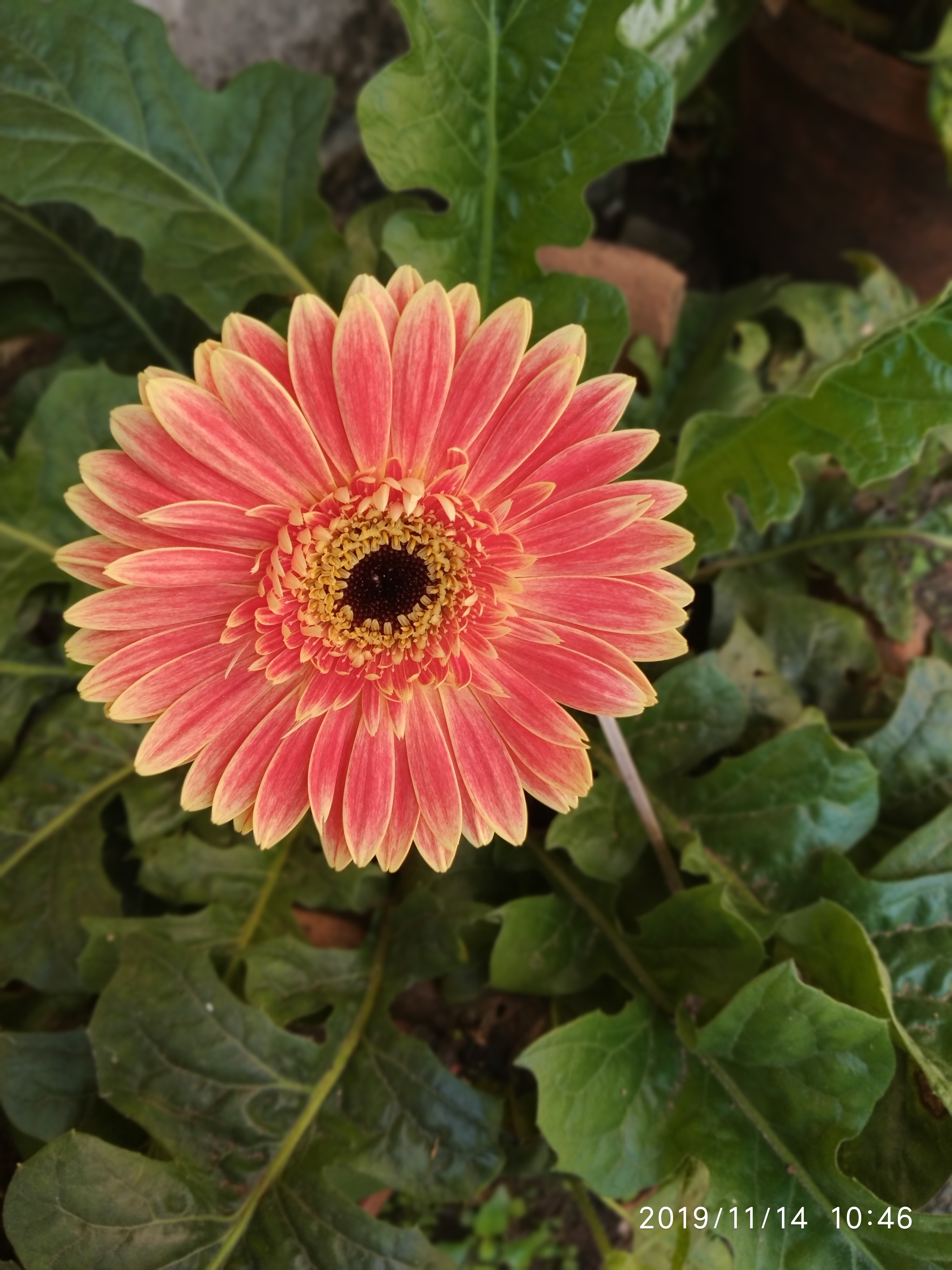
Gerbera × hybrida

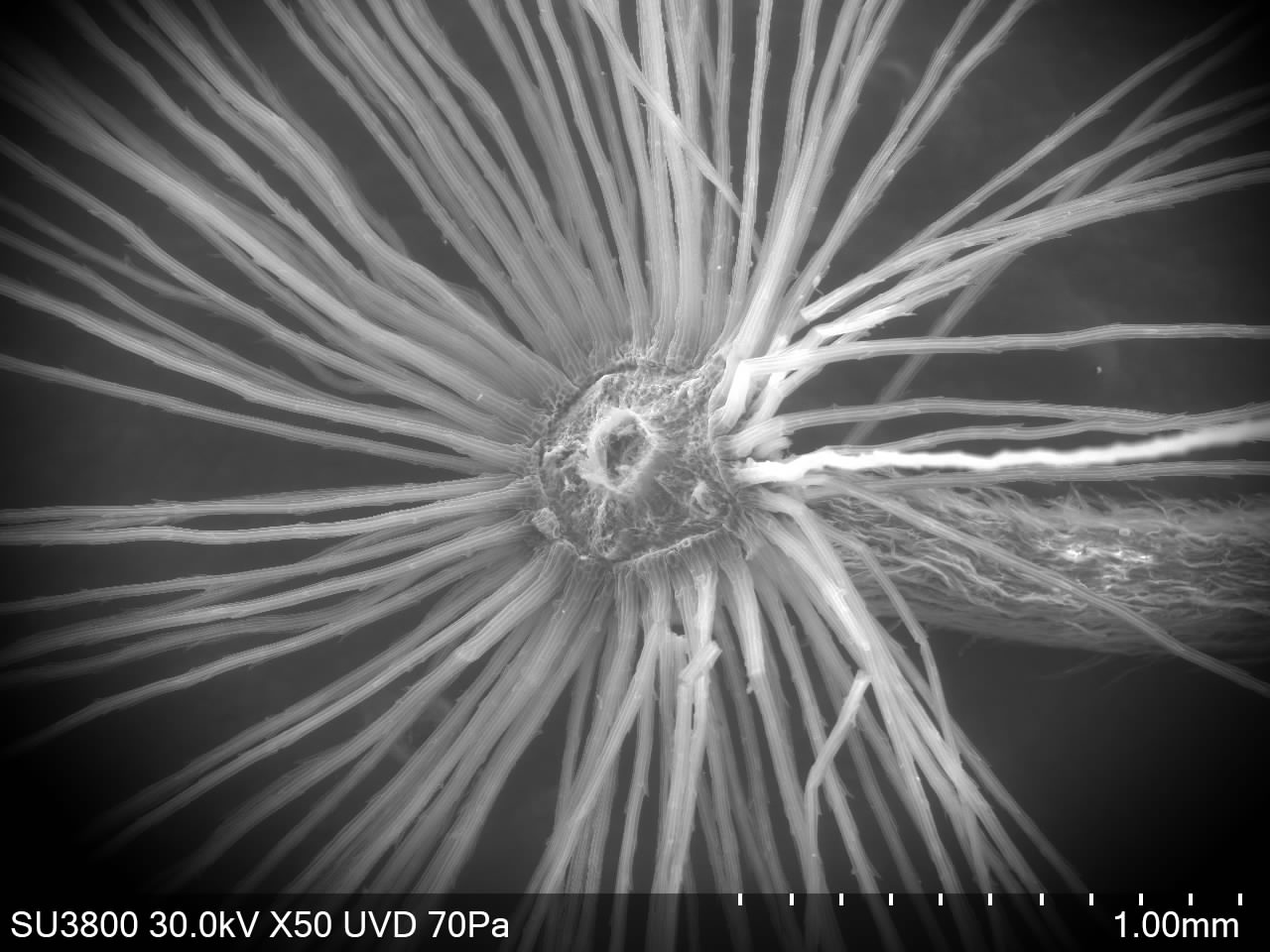
SEM micrograph of Gerbera pappus

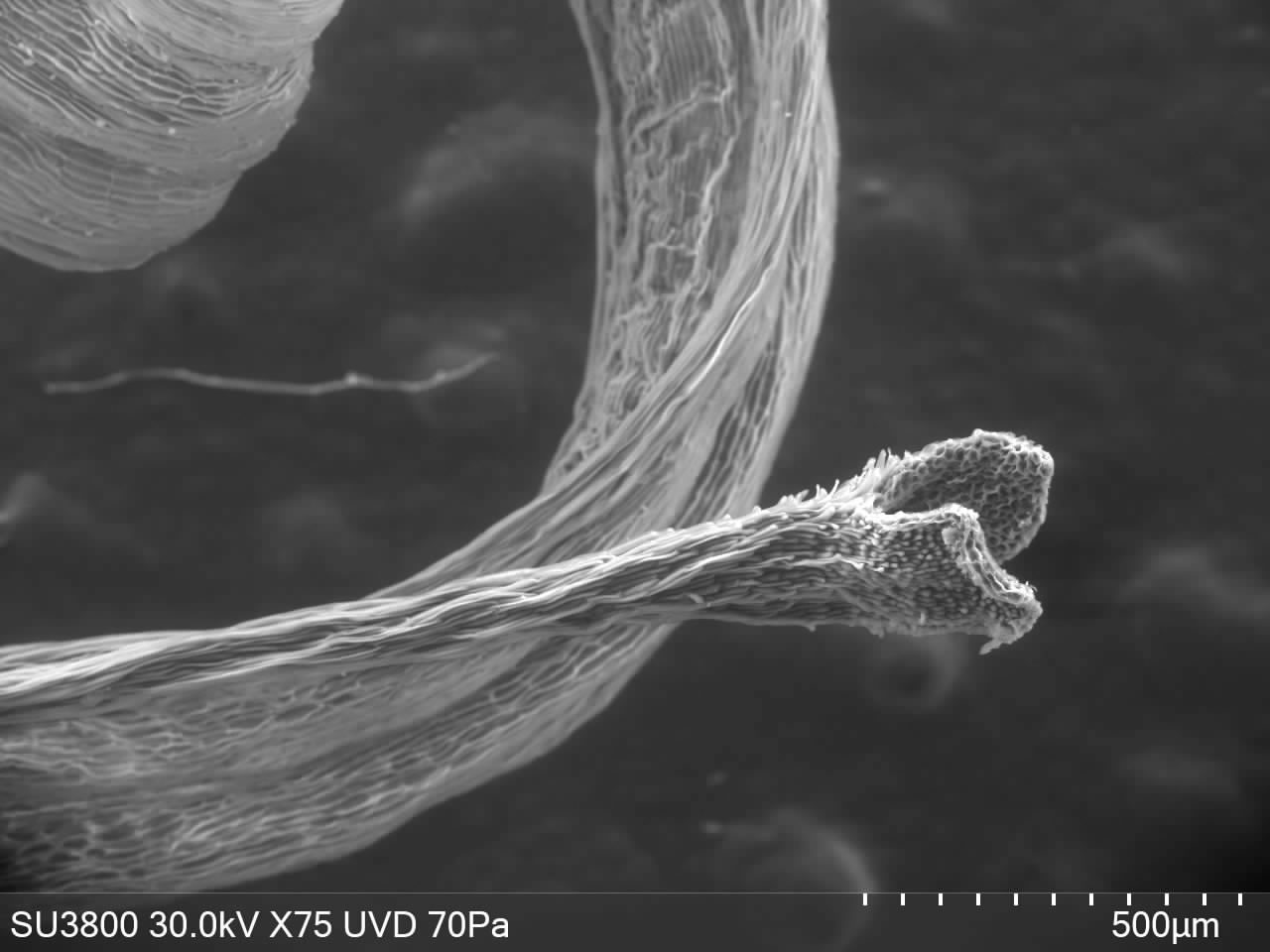
SEM micrograph of beak/rostrum (stalk) that attaches Gerbera pappus to the underlying cypsela (fruit).

== Distribution ==
Gerbera is native to tropical regions of Africa. It was introduced into countries of Latin America and Southeast Asia.

== Uses ==
Gerbera is very popular and widely used as a decorative garden plant or as cut flowers. The domesticated cultivars are mostly a result of a cross between Gerbera jamesonii and another South African species Gerbera viridifolia. The cross is known as Gerbera × hybrida. Thousands of cultivars exist, varying greatly in shape, size, and color, which include white, yellow, orange, red, and pink. The centre of the flower is sometimes black. Often the same flower can have petals of several different colours. The flower-heads (capitula) can be as small as 7 cm (Gerbera 'mini Harley') in diameter or up to 12 cm (Gerbera ‘Golden Serena’).

Gerbera is important commercially. It is the fifth most used cut flower in the world (after rose, carnation, chrysanthemum, and tulip). It is also used as a model organism in studying flower formation.

Gerbera contains naturally occurring coumarin derivatives. It is attractive to bees, butterflies, and birds, but resistant to deer. Small ones are called gerbrinis.
