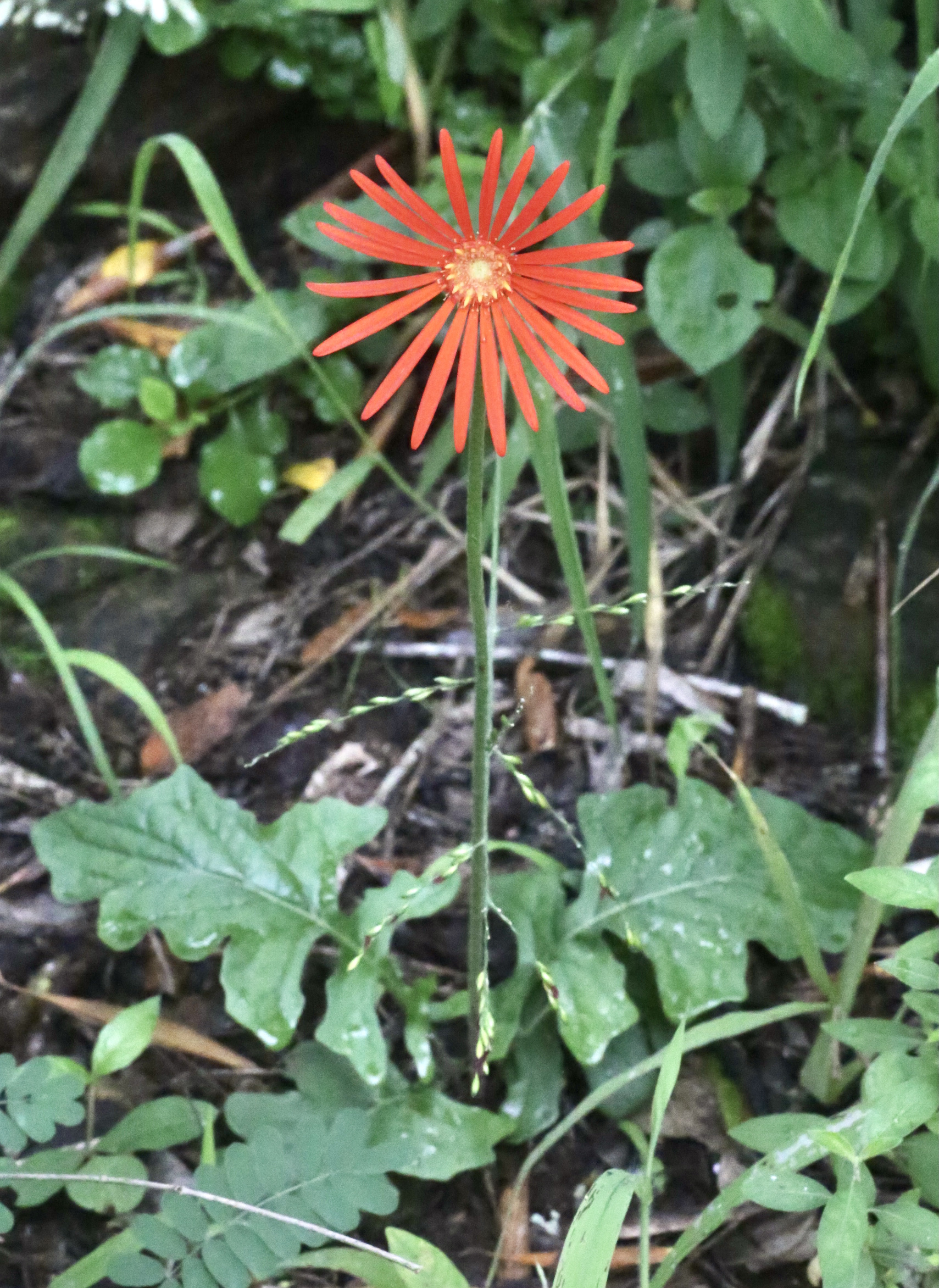
- Gerbera jamesonii from Mpumalanga

Scientific classification
- Kingdom: Plantae
- Clade: Embryophytes
- Clade: Tracheophytes
- Clade: Angiosperms
- Clade: Eudicots
- Clade: Asterids
- Order: Asterales
- Family: Asteraceae
- Genus: Gerbera
- Species: G. jamesonii

Binomial name
- Gerbera jamesonii Bolus ex Hooker f. (1889)

= Gerbera jamesonii =

Species of flowering plant

Gerbera jamesonii is a species of flowering plant in the genus Gerbera belonging to the basal Mutisieae tribe within the large Asteraceae (or Compositae) family. It is indigenous to South Eastern Africa and commonly known as the Barberton daisy, the Transvaal daisy, and as Barbertonse madeliefie or Rooigousblom in Afrikaans. It was the first species of Gerbera to be the subject of a scientific description, studied by J. D. Hooker in Curtis's Botanical Magazine in 1889.

== Etymology ==
The genus was named in honour of German botanist and medical doctor Traugott Gerber (1710—1743).

The Gerbera jamesonii was named in honour of Robert Jameson, who collected the plant near Barberton. The species epithet was proposed by the prominent South African botanist Harry Bolus, but first published by Richard Wills Adlam in 1888, so should be ascribed to him.

== Description ==
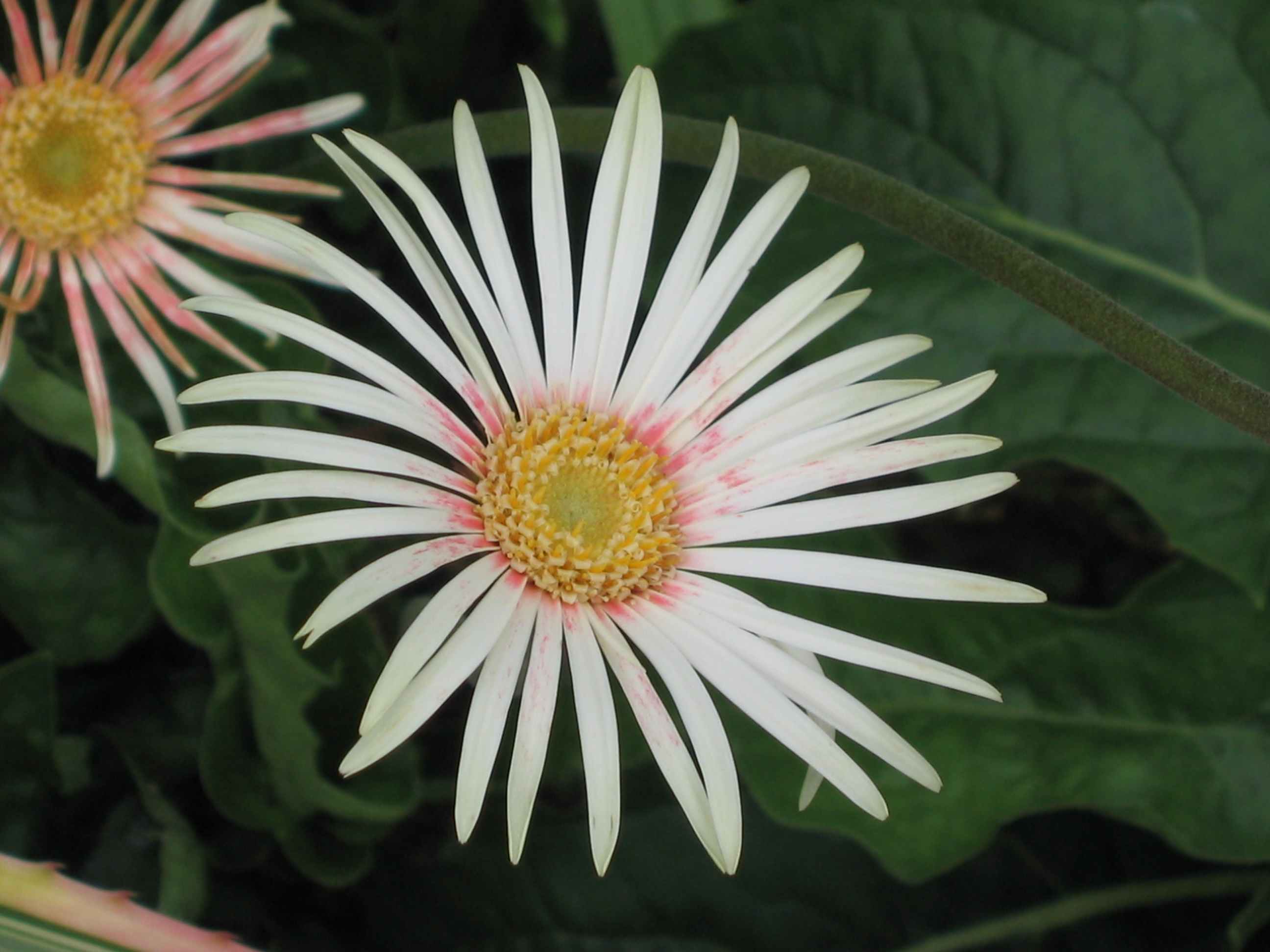
Gerbera jamesonii, white form

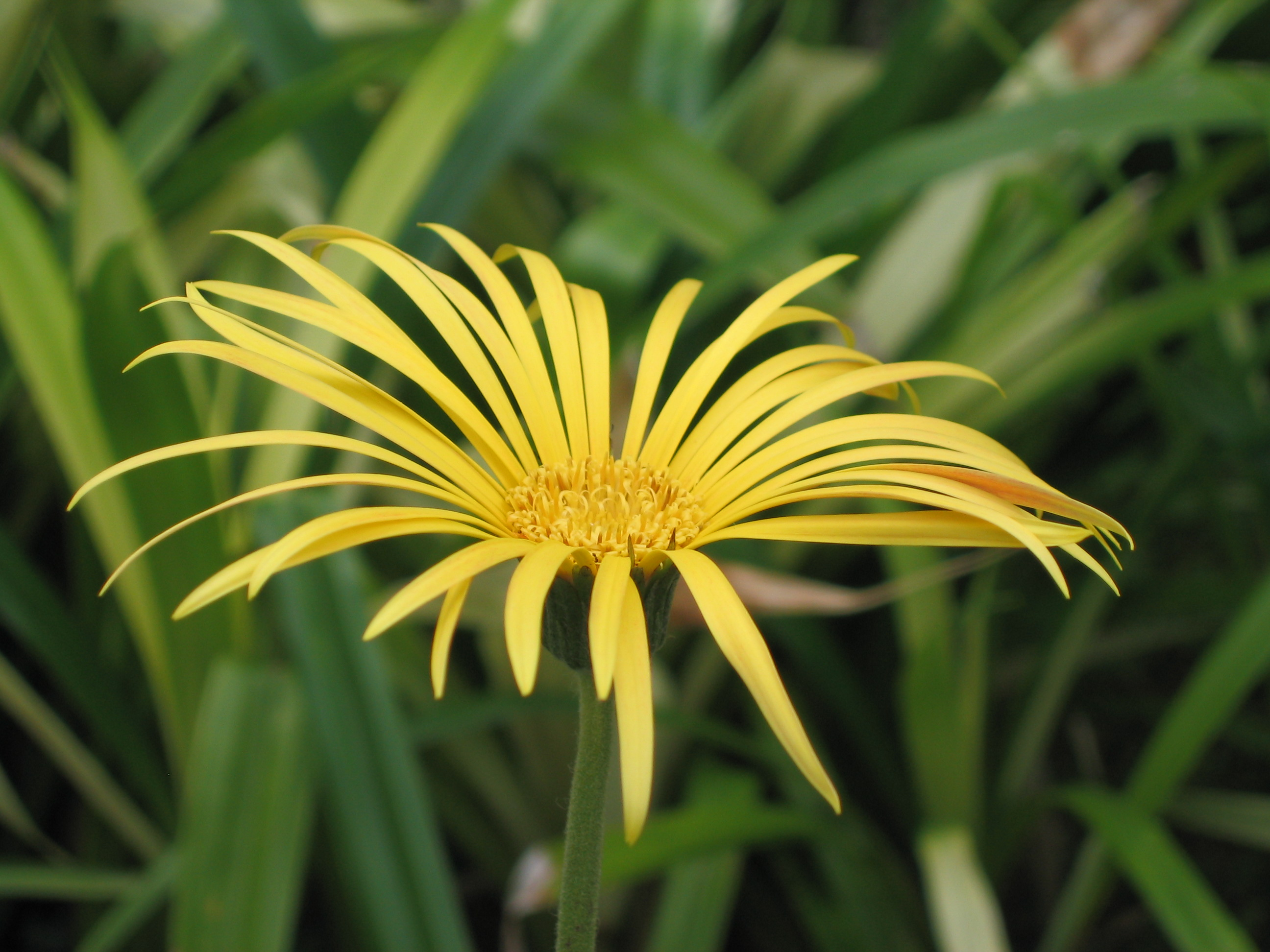
Gerbera jamesonii, yellow form

Gerbera jamesonii is a tufted perennial herb with the naked flowering scapes up to 75 cm high. Petiolate, deeply undulating or lobed leaves are 15–42 (up to 68) cm long and 4–14 cm wide, gathered in rosette. The plant produces spectacular flowers (capitula) of 4–5 cm in diameter with normally orange-red (rarely yellow, orange, white, pink) ray florets. It flowers from September to December, reproduces asexually. The seeds have a pappus of bristles.

== Distribution ==
Gerbera jamesonii is endemic to Mpumalanga, Limpopo and Eswatini. The plant is introduced into several countries of Latin America, Equatorial Africa and Southeast Asia.

== Ecology ==
The species grows from 500 to 1670 m above sea level on rocky slopes in woodland, usually in some shade or under bushes and trees. The flowers are pollinated by bees and other insects. The seeds are light and easily dispersed by wind.

== Uses ==
The species is the ancestor of all cultivated forms of Gerbera, or they originate from the cross Gerbera jamesonii and Gerbera viridifolia, originally made by R. I. Lynch in Cambridge, England about 1890. He named the hybrid as Gerbera × cantebrigiensis, known today as Gerbera × hybrida. Nowadays thousands of cultivars exist and they are the important article of trade belonging to the most important ornamental crops in the world together with rose, chrysanthemum, carnation, lily and tulip. The popular cultivars include "Sazou", "Sangria", "Rosalin", "Pink Elegance", "Tropic Blend", "Piton", "Winter Queen", "Savannah", "Primrose" and many others. They are propagated by tissue culture and by seeds.

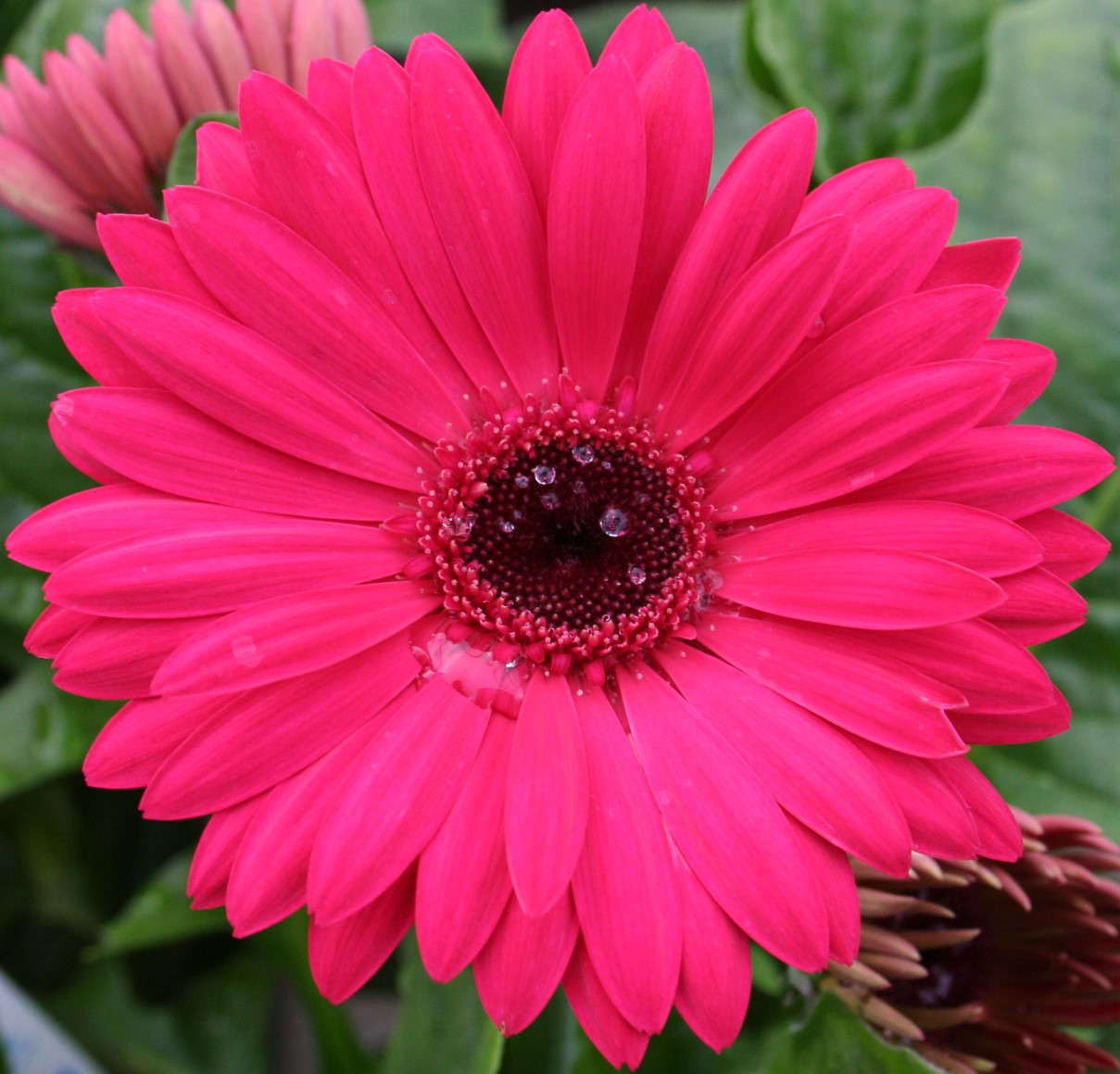
Cultivar "West Virginia"

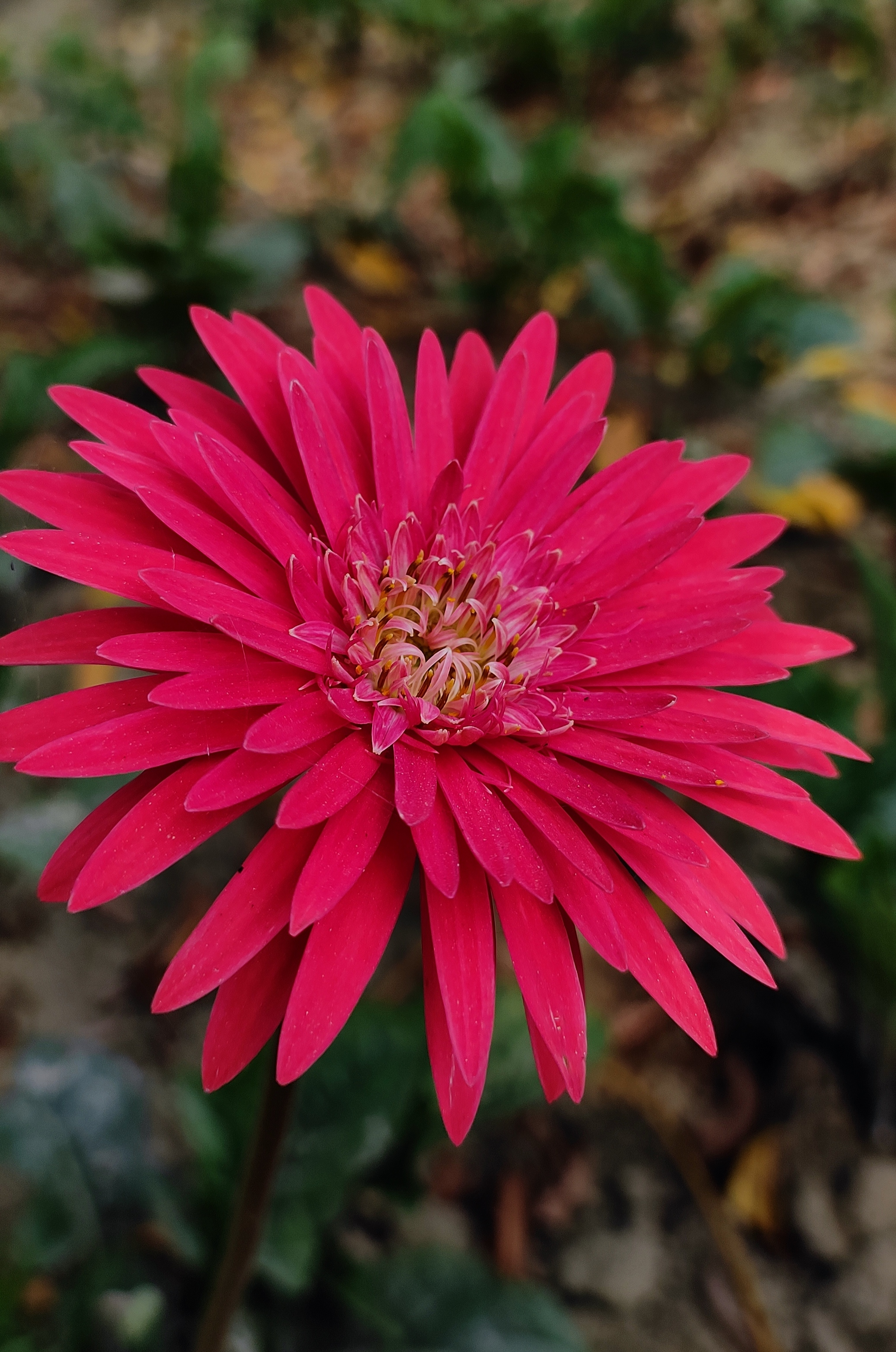
Gerbera × hybrida

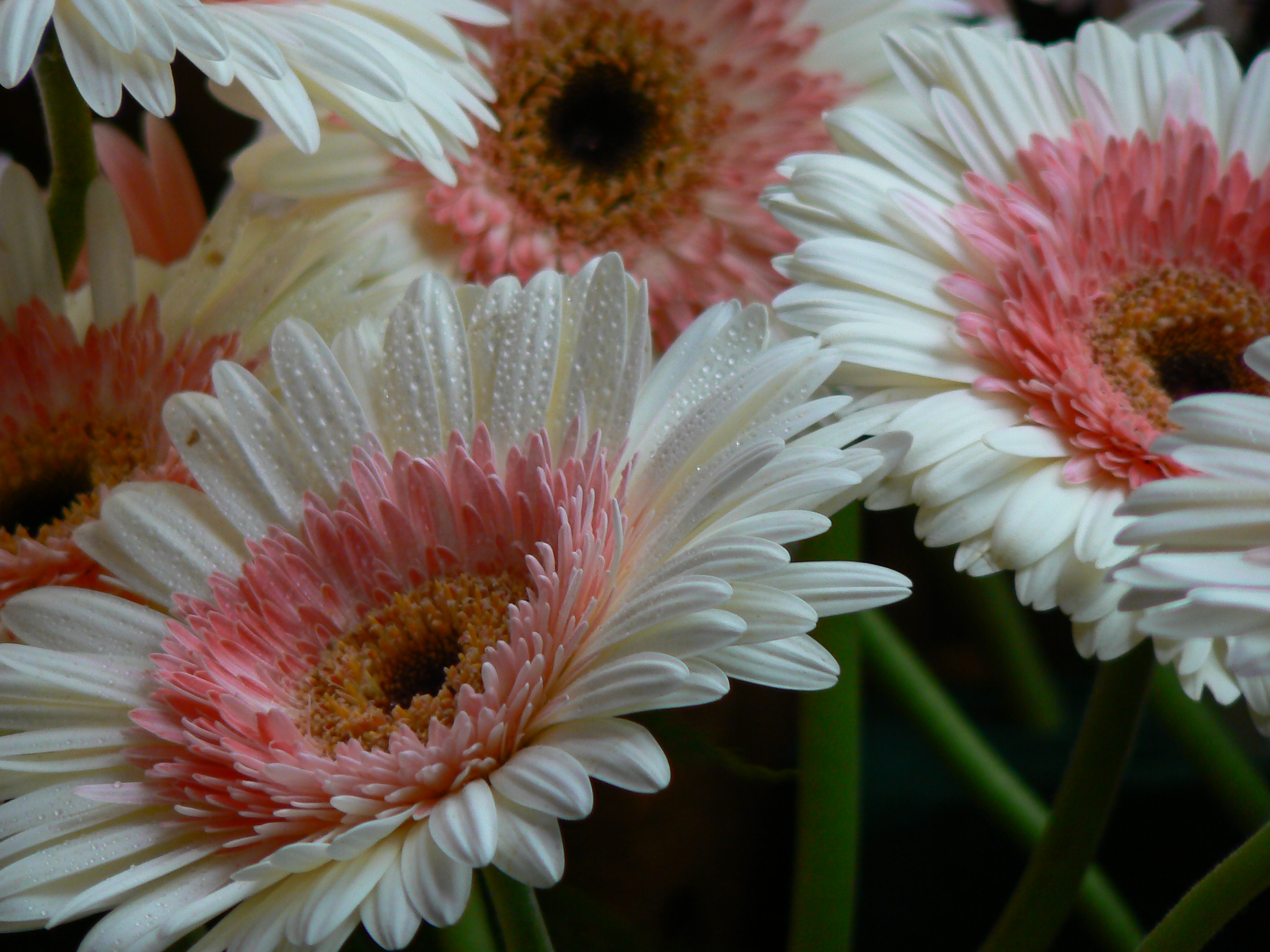
Gerbera × hybrida

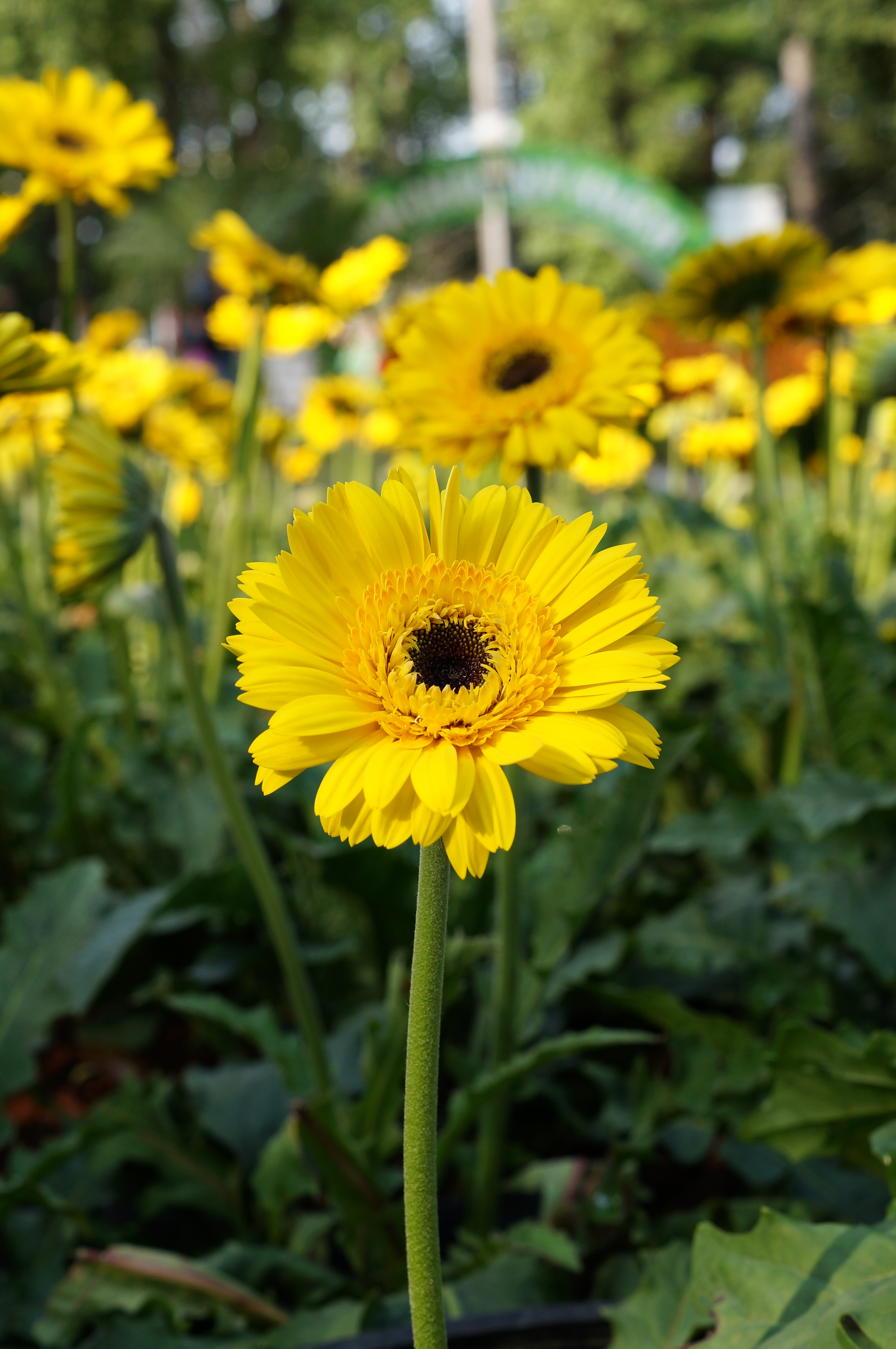
Gerbera × hybrida

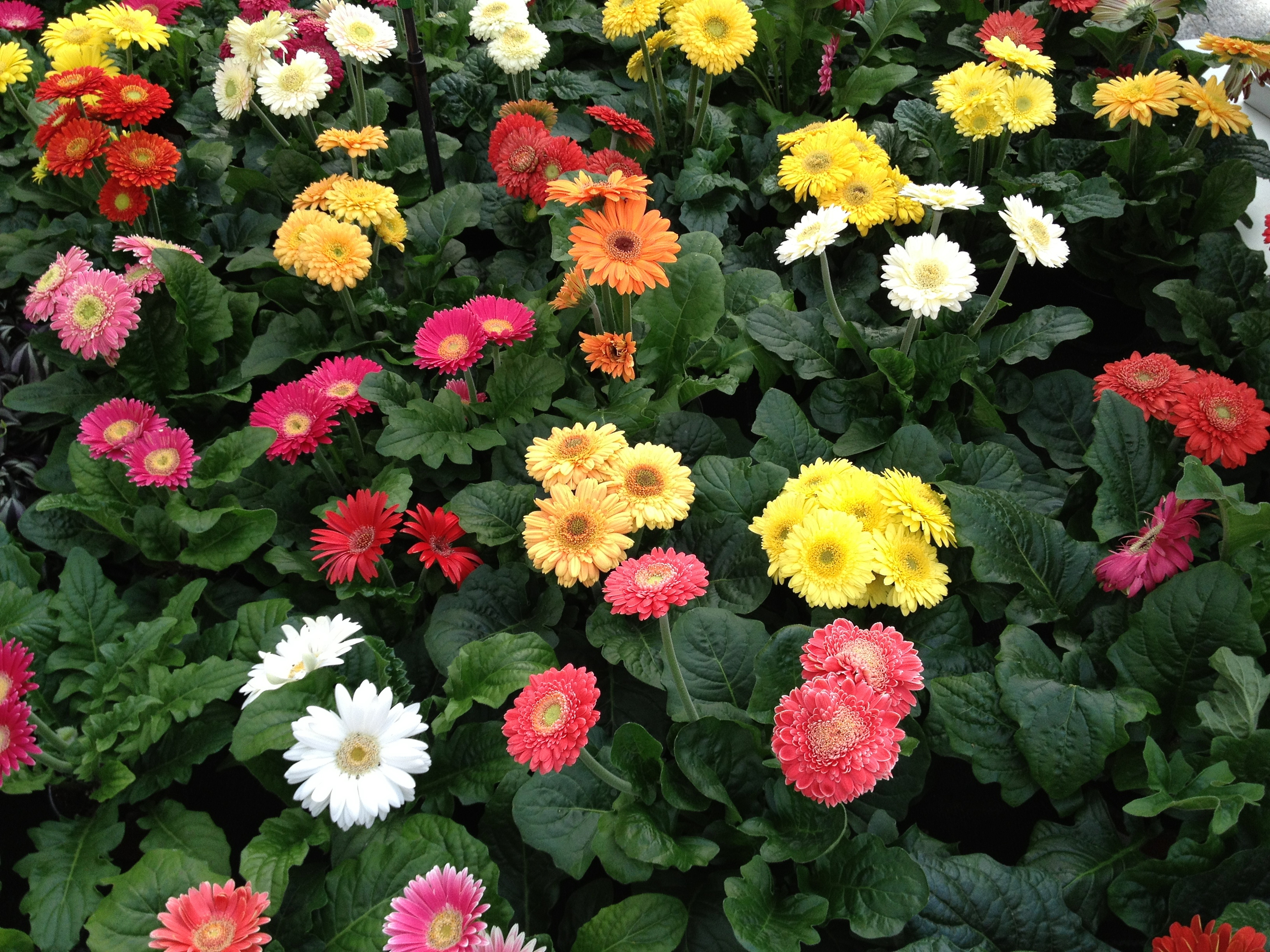
Gerbera × hybrida

== In culture ==
The flag and coat of arms of the Province of Mpumalanga include a depiction of this flower.

== Pests ==
=== Fungi ===
- Foot rot caused by Phytophthora tentaculata
- Root rot caused by Rhizoctonia solani and Pythium irregulare.
- Grey mildew caused by Botrytis cinerea.
- Powdery mildew caused by an unknown Golovinomyces species.
- Leaf blight caused by Alternaria alternata, A. citri, A. tennuisssima.
- Leaf spots caused by Ascochyta gerberae, Gloeosporium spp. and other fungi.

=== Insects ===
- Plant lice Aphids.
- Leafminer Liriomyza trifolii.
- Greenhouse whiteflies Trialeurodes vaporariorum and Bemisia tabaci.
- Thrips Thrips tabaci and Heliothrips haemorrhoidalis.

=== Mites ===
- Spider mite Tetranychus urticae
- Broad mite Polyphagotarsonemus latus.
- Cyclamen mite Steneotarsonemus pallidus.
