= Phytophthora tentaculata =

Scientific classification
- Domain: Eukaryota
- Clade: Sar
- Clade: Stramenopiles
- Division: Oomycota
- Class: Peronosporomycetes
- Order: Peronosporales
- Family: Peronosporaceae
- Genus: Phytophthora
- Species: P. tentaculata

Binomial name
- Phytophthora tentaculata Kröber & Marwitz, 1993

Species of oomycete that causes root and stalk rot

Phytophthora tentaculata is a plant pathogen that causes root and stalk rot. It was first isolated in 1993 in a nursery in Germany infecting Chrysanthemum, Verbena, and Delphinium ajacis. It has since been found infecting a Verbena in Majorca, Spain in June 2001 but was thought to be restricted to nurseries in Germany and the Netherlands. Other species have since been found to be infected, Santolina chamaecyparissus (Lavender cotton) in Spain in 2004, Gerbera jamesonii in Italy 2006, and Aucklandia lappa in China in 2008.
