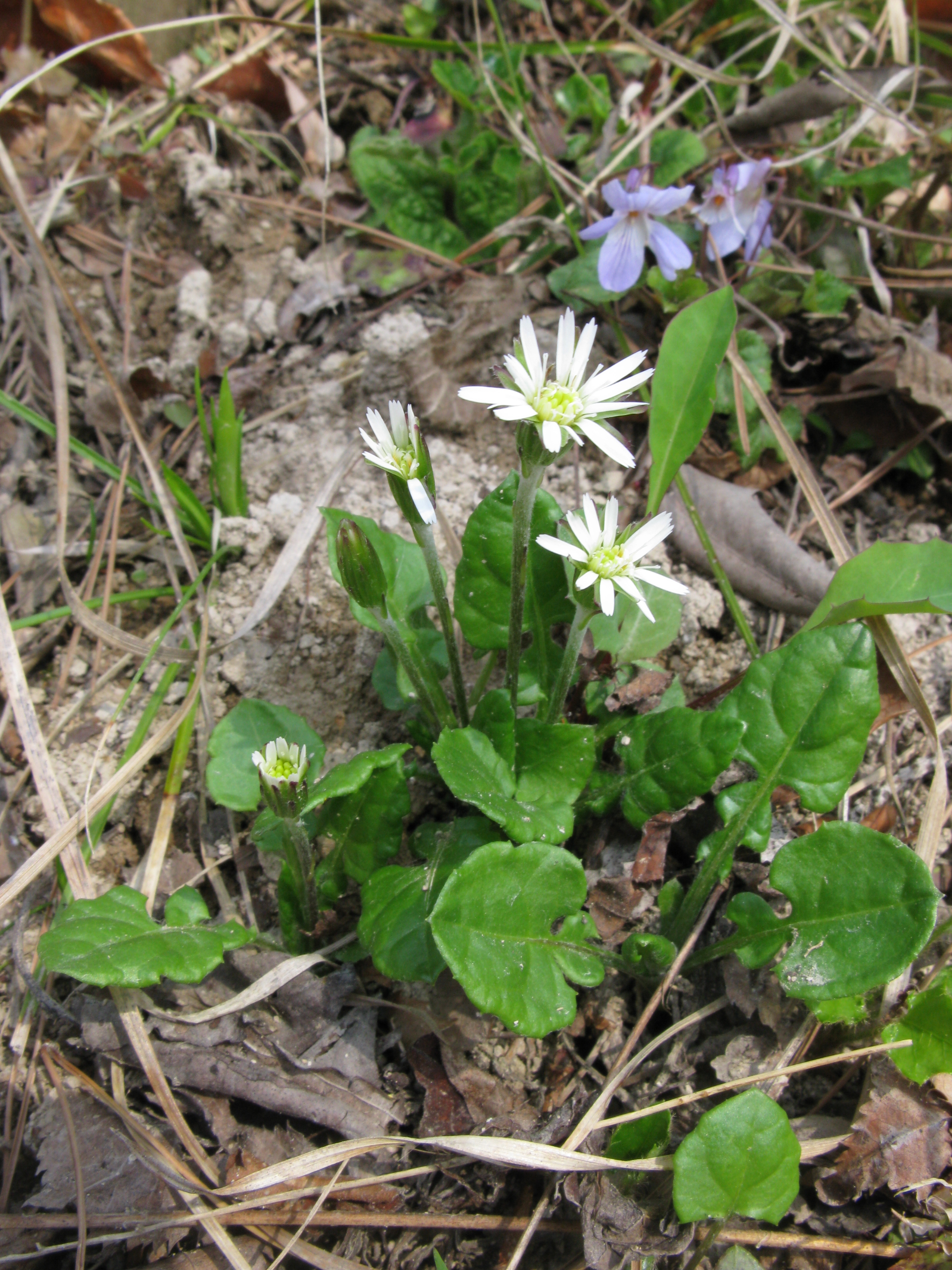
- Leibnitzia anandria

Scientific classification
- Kingdom: Plantae
- Clade: Tracheophytes
- Clade: Angiosperms
- Clade: Eudicots
- Clade: Asterids
- Order: Asterales
- Family: Asteraceae
- Subfamily: Mutisioideae
- Tribe: Mutisieae
- Genus: Leibnitzia; Cass.

Type species
- Tussilago anandria L.

Synonyms
- Cleistanthium Kuntze; Anandria Siegesb. ex Less.

= Leibnitzia =

Genus of flowering plants

Leibnitzia (sunbonnets) is a genus of Asian and North American flowering plants in the family Asteraceae.

The genus is named for Gottfried Wilhelm von Leibniz (1646-1716), German scientist and mathematician

Species

- Leibnitzia anandria (L.) Turcz. - Japan, Korea, Manchuria, Mongolia, Siberia, Russian Far East
- Leibnitzia knorringiana (B.Fedtsch.) Pobed. - Kazakhstan, Kyrgyzstan, Uzbekistan
- Leibnitzia lyrata (Sch.Bip.) G.L.Nesom - United States (Arizona, New Mexico), Mexico (from Chihuahua to Oaxaca)
- Leibnitzia occimadrensis G.L.Nesom - Sinaloa
- Leibnitzia phanerogama Cass. - Siberia
- Leibnitzia pusilla (Wall. ex DC.) S.Gould ex Kitam. & Gould - Bhutan, Nepal, southwestern China

formerly included

see Gerbera

- Leibnitzia bonatiana (Beauverd) Kitam.- Gerbera bonatiana (Beauverd) Beauverd
- Leibnitzia nepalensis (Kunze) Kitam. - Gerbera kunzeana A.Br. & Asch.
- Leibnitzia ruficoma (Franch.) Kitam. - Gerbera ruficoma Franch.
