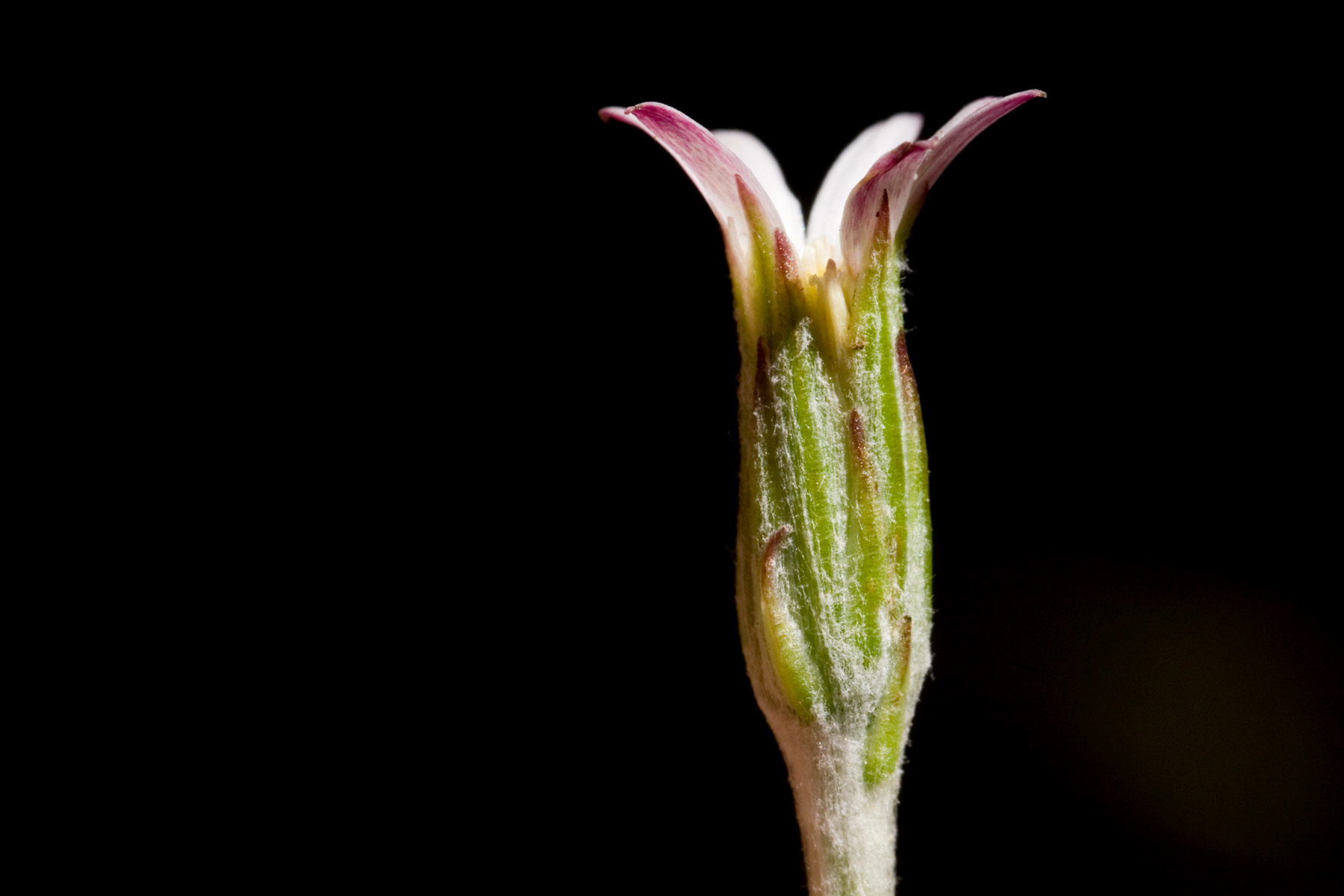

Scientific classification
- Kingdom: Plantae
- Clade: Tracheophytes
- Clade: Angiosperms
- Clade: Eudicots
- Clade: Asterids
- Order: Asterales
- Family: Asteraceae
- Genus: Leibnitzia
- Species: L. lyrata

Binomial name
- Leibnitzia lyrata (Sch. Bip.) G.L. Nesom

Synonyms
- Chaptalia alsophila Greene; Chaptalia ehrenbergii (Sch. Bip.) Hemsl.; Chaptalia leucocephala Greene; Chaptalia lyrata (Willd.) Spreng.; Chaptalia lyrata D. Don, illegitimate homonym; Chaptalia monticola Greene; Chaptalia seemannii (Sch. Bip.) Hemsl.; Chaptalia sonchifolia Greene; Gerbera ehrenbergii Sch. Bip.; Gerbera lyrata Sch. Bip. (basionym); Gerbera seemannii Sch. Bip.; Hieracium stipitatum Sessé & Moc. ex D. Don; Leibnitzia seemannii (Sch. Bip.) G.L. Nesom; Thyrsanthema ehrenbergii (Sch. Bip.) Kuntze; Thyrsanthema lyrata Kuntze; Thyrsanthema seemannii (Sch. Bip.) Kuntze

= Leibnitzia lyrata =

Species of flowering plant

Leibnitzia lyrata, common name Seemann's sunbonnet, is a plant species widespread across much of Mexico and also found in the US states of Arizona and New Mexico. It is found in open locations in pine-oak woodlands, often in disturbed areas.

Leibnitzia lyrata is a perennial herb up to 60 cm (2 feet) tall. Heads are borne singly. Outer florets of the head are pink to purplish, the inner florets white. Flowers tend to be fully open early in the season but remain closed and self-fertilizing later in the year.
