= Glossary of leaf morphology =

Chart illustrating leaf morphology terms

The following terms are used to describe leaf morphology in the description and taxonomy of plants. Leaves may be simple (that is, the leaf blade or 'lamina' is undivided) or compound (that is, the leaf blade is divided into two or more leaflets). The edge of the leaf may be regular or irregular, and may be smooth or have hair, bristles, or spines. For more terms describing other aspects of leaves besides their overall morphology, see the leaf article.

The terms listed here all are supported by technical and professional usage, but they cannot be represented as mandatory or undebatable; readers must use their judgement. Authors often use terms arbitrarily, or coin them to taste, possibly in ignorance of established terms, and it is not always clear whether because of ignorance, or personal preference, or because usages change with time or context, or because of variation between specimens, even specimens from the same plant. For example, whether to call leaves on the same tree "acuminate", "lanceolate", or "linear" could depend on individual judgement, or which part of the tree one collected them from. The same cautions might apply to "caudate", "cuspidate", and "mucronate", or to "crenate", "dentate", and "serrate".

Another problem is to establish definitions that meet all cases or satisfy all authorities and readers. For example, it seems altogether reasonable to define a mucro as "a small sharp point as a continuation of the midrib", but it may not be clear how small is small enough, how sharp is sharp enough, how hard the point must be, and what to call the point when one cannot tell whether the leaf has a midrib at all. Various authors or field workers might come to incompatible conclusions, or might try to compromise by qualifying terms so vaguely that a description of a particular plant practically loses its value.

Use of these terms is not restricted to leaves, but may be applied to morphology of other parts of plants, e.g. bracts, bracteoles, stipules, sepals, petals, carpels or scales. Some of these terms are also used for similar-looking anatomical features on animals.

== Leaf structure ==
Leaves of most plants include a flat structure called the blade or lamina supported by a network of veins, a petiole and a leaf base; but not all leaves are flat, some are cylindrical. Leaves may be simple, with a single leaf blade, or compound, with several leaflets. Compound leaves may be pinnate with pinnae (leaflets) on both sides of a rachis (axis), or may be palmate with multiple leaflets arising from a single point. Leaf structure is described by several terms that include:

Image	Term	Latin	Description
	bifoliolate		Having two leaflets
	geminate		Having two leaflets
	jugate		Having two leaflets
	bigeminate		Having two leaflets, each leaflet being bifoliolate
	bipinnate	bipinnatus	The leaflets are themselves pinnately-compound; twice pinnate see imparipinnate and paripinnate
	biternate		With three components, each with three leaflets
	imparipinnate		With an odd number of leaflets, pinnate with a terminal leaflet (the opposite of paripinnate)
	odd-pinnate		With an odd number of leaflets, pinnate with a terminal leaflet (the opposite of paripinnate)
	paripinnate		Pinnate with an even number of leaflets, lacking a terminal leaflet (the opposite of imparipinnate)
	even-pinnate		Pinnate with an even number of leaflets, lacking a terminal leaflet (the opposite of imparipinnate)
	palmately compound	palmatus	Consisting of leaflets all radiating from one point
	simple		Leaf blade in one continuous section, without leaflets (not compound)
	ternate	ternatus	With three leaflets
	trifoliate	trifoliatus	With three leaflets
	trifoliolate	trifoliolatus	With three leaflets
	tripinnate	tripinnatus	Pinnately compound in which each leaflet is itself bipinnate

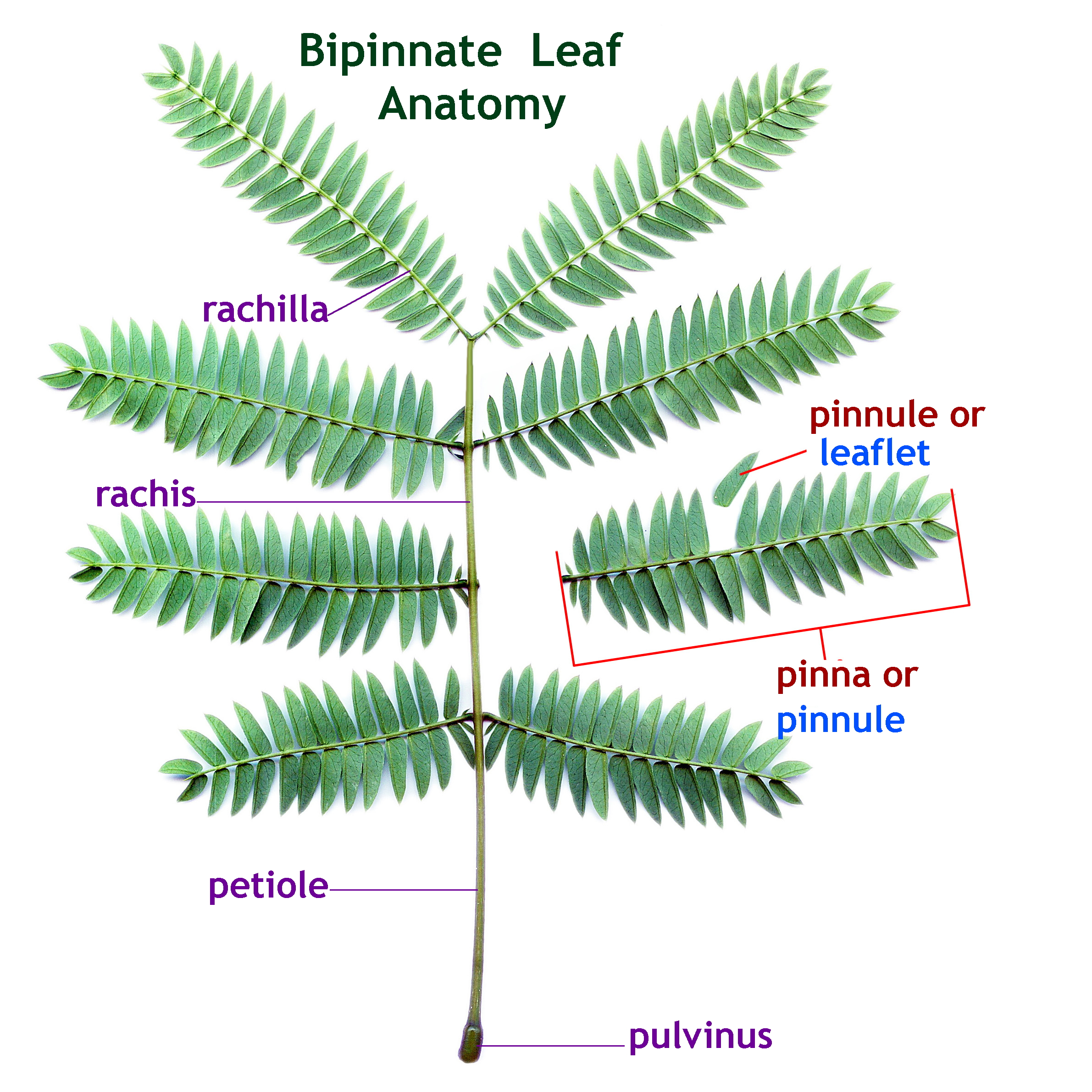
Bipinnate leaf anatomy with labels showing alternative usages

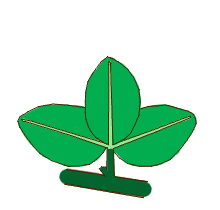
A ternate compound leaf with a petiole but no rachis (or rachillae)

== Leaf and leaflet shapes ==
Being one of the more visible features, leaf shape is commonly used for plant identification. Similar terms are used for other plant parts, such as petals, tepals, and bracts.

Image	Term	Latin	Refers principally to	Description
	acicular	acicularis	whole leaf	Slender and pointed, needle-like
	acuminate	acuminatus	leaf tip	Tapering to a long point in a concave manner
	acute		leaf tip or base	Pointed, having a short sharp apex angled less than 90°
	apiculate	apiculatus	leaf tip	Tapering and ending in a short, slender point
	aristate	aristatus	leaf tip	Ending in a stiff, bristle-like point
	asymmetrical		whole leaf	With the blade shape different on each side of the midrib
	attenuate	attenuatus	leaf base	Having leaf tissue taper down the petiole to a narrow base and always having some leaf material on each side of the petiole
	auriculate	auriculatus	leaf base	Having ear-shaped appendages reaching beyond the attachment to the petiole or stem (in case of a seated leaf)
	caudate	caudatus	leaf tip	Tailed at the apex
	cirrus, cirrate		leaf tip	Having a rachis that extends beyond the leaf blade or leaflets into a long whip-like extension or cirrus (common in climbing palms); antonym: ecirrate
	cordate, cordiform	cordatus	whole leaf or base	Heart-shaped, with the petiole or stem attached to the notch
	cuneate	cuneatus	leaf base	Triangular, wedge-shaped, stem attaches to point
	cuneiform		whole leaf	Narrowly triangular, widest on the opposite end from the stem, with the corners at that end rounded
	cuspidate	cuspidatus	leaf tip	With a sharp, elongated, rigid tip; tipped with a cusp
	deltoid, deltate	deltoideus	whole leaf	Shaped like the Greek letter delta; triangular with stem attached to side
	digitate	digitatus	whole leaf	A palmately compound leaf with leaflets, similar to palmate
	ecirrate		leaf tip	Without a cirrus; antonym: cirrate
	elliptic	ellipticus	whole leaf	Shaped like an ellipse (widest at mid-blade and with similar convex tapering towards apex and base), with a short or no point
	emarginate	emarginatus	leaf tip	Slightly indented at the tip
	ensiform	ensiformis	whole leaf	Shaped like a sword; long and narrow with a sharp pointed tip
	falcate	falcatus	whole leaf	Sickle-shaped
	fenestrate	fenestratus	leaf surface features	Large openings through the leaf; see perforate; sometimes used to describe leaf epidermal windows
	filiform	filiformis	whole leaf	Thread- or filament-shaped
	flabellate	flabellatus	whole leaf	Semi-circular or fan-like
	hastate	hastatus	whole leaf or base	Spear-shaped: pointed, with barbs, shaped like a spear point, with flaring pointed lobes at the base
	laciniate	lacinatus	whole leaf	Very deeply lobed with the lobes being very drawn out and often making the leaf look somewhat like a branch or a pitchfork
	laminar		3-D shape	Flat (like most leaves)
	lanceolate	lanceolatus	whole leaf	Long, wider in the middle, shaped like a lance tip
	linear	linearis	whole leaf	Long and very narrow like a blade of grass
	lobed	lobatus	whole leaf	Being divided by clefts; may be pinnately lobed or palmately lobed
	lorate	loratus	whole leaf	Having the form of a thong or strap
	lyrate	lyratus	whole leaf	Shaped like a lyre, pinnately lobed leaf with an enlarged terminal lobe and smaller lateral lobes. See also List of lyrate plants.
	mucronate	mucronatus	leaf tip	Ending abruptly in a small sharp point as a continuation of the midrib
	multifid	multi + findere	whole leaf	Cleft into many parts or lobes
	obcordate	obcordatus	whole leaf	Heart-shaped, stem attaches at the tapering end
	oblanceolate	oblanceolatus	whole leaf	Much longer than wide and with the widest portion near the tip; reversed lanceolate
	oblique		leaf base	Asymmetrical leaf base, with one side lower than the other
	oblong	oblongus	whole leaf	Having an elongated form with slightly parallel sides; roughly rectangular
	obovate	obovatus	whole leaf	Teardrop-shaped, stem attaches to the tapering end; reversed ovate
	obtrullate		whole leaf	Reversed trullate; the longer sides meet at the base rather than the apex.
	obtuse	obtusus	leaf tip or base	Blunt, forming an angle > 90°
	orbicular	orbicularis	whole leaf	Circular
	ovate	ovatus	whole leaf	Egg-shaped, with a tapering point and the widest portion near the petiole
	palmate	palmatus	whole leaf	Palm-shaped, i.e. with lobes or leaflets stemming from the leaf base
	palmately lobed	palmatus	whole leaf	Lobes spread radially from a point
	palmatifid	palma + findere	whole leaf	Palm-shaped, having lobes with incisions that extend less than halfway toward the petiole
	palmatipartite	palma + partiri	whole leaf	Having palmate lobes with incisions that extend over halfway toward the petiole
	palmatisect	palma + secare	whole leaf	Having palmate lobes with incisions that extend almost up, but not quite to the petiole.
	pandurate	panduratus	whole leaf	Fiddle-shaped; obovate with a constriction near the middle.
	pedate	pedatus	whole leaf	Palmate, with cleft lobes
	peltate	peltatus	stem attachment	A round leaf where the petiole attaches near the center, e.g. a lotus leaf
	perfoliate	perfoliatus	stem attachment	With the leaf blade surrounding the stem such that the stem appears to pass through the leaf
	perforate	perforatus	leaf surface features	Many holes, or perforations, on leaf surface. Compare with fenestrate.
	pinnately lobed	pinna + lobus	whole leaf	Having lobes pinnately arranged on the central axis
	pinnatifid	pinna + findere	whole leaf	Having lobes with incisions that extend less than halfway to the midrib
	pinnatipartite	pinnatus + partiri	whole leaf	Having lobes with incisions that extend more than halfway to the midrib
	pinnatisect	pinnatus + sectus	whole leaf	Having lobes with incisions that extend almost to, or up to, the midrib
	reniform	reniformis	whole leaf	Shaped like a kidney, with an inward curve on one side
	retuse		leaf tip	With a shallow notch in a round apex
	rhomboid, rhombic	rhomboidalis	whole leaf	Diamond-shaped
	rounded	rotundifolius	leaf tip or base	Circular, no distinct point
	semiterete		3-D shape	Rounded on one side and flat on the other
	sagittate	sagittatus	whole leaf	Arrowhead-shaped with the lower lobes folded, or curled downward
	spatulate	spathulatus	whole leaf	Spoon-shaped; having a broad flat end which tapers to the base
	spear-shaped	hastatus	whole leaf	See hastate.
	subobtuse	subobtusus	leaf tip or base	Somewhat blunted; neither blunt nor sharp
	subulate	subulatus	leaf tip	Awl-shaped with a tapering point
	terete		3-D shape	Cylindrical with a circular or distorted circular cross-section and a single surface wrapping around it with no grooves or ridges. Subterete means the leaves are not completely terete, as seen in various lichens and succulents.
	trullate		whole leaf	Shaped like a masonry trowel
	truncate	truncatus	leaf tip or base	With a squared-off end
	undulate	undulatus	3-D shape	Wave-like
	unifoliate	unifoliatus	compound leaves	With a single leaflet; it is distinct from a simple leaf by the presence of two abscission layers and often by petiolules and stipels.

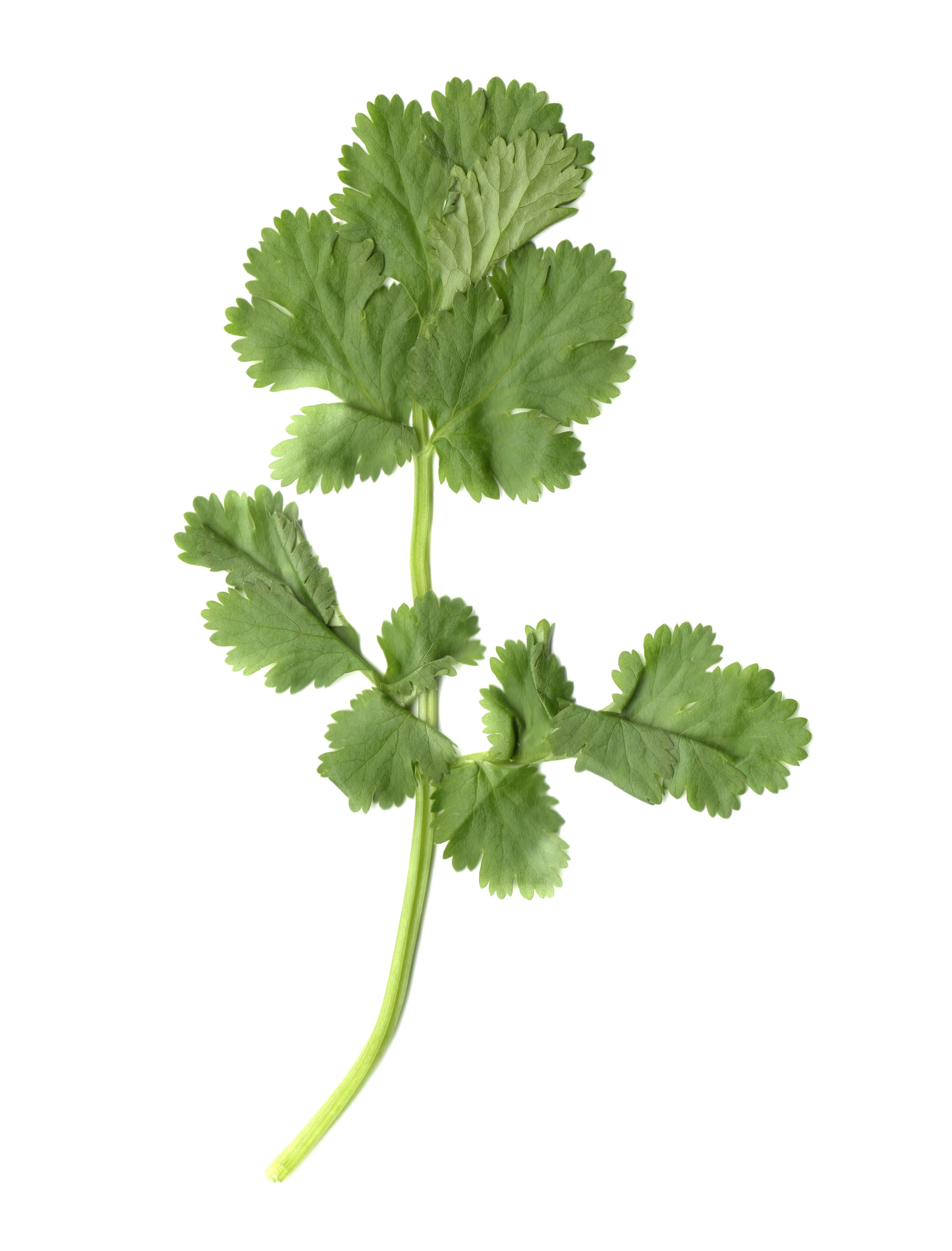
Oddly pinnate, pinnatifid leaves (Coriandrum sativum, coriander or cilantro)

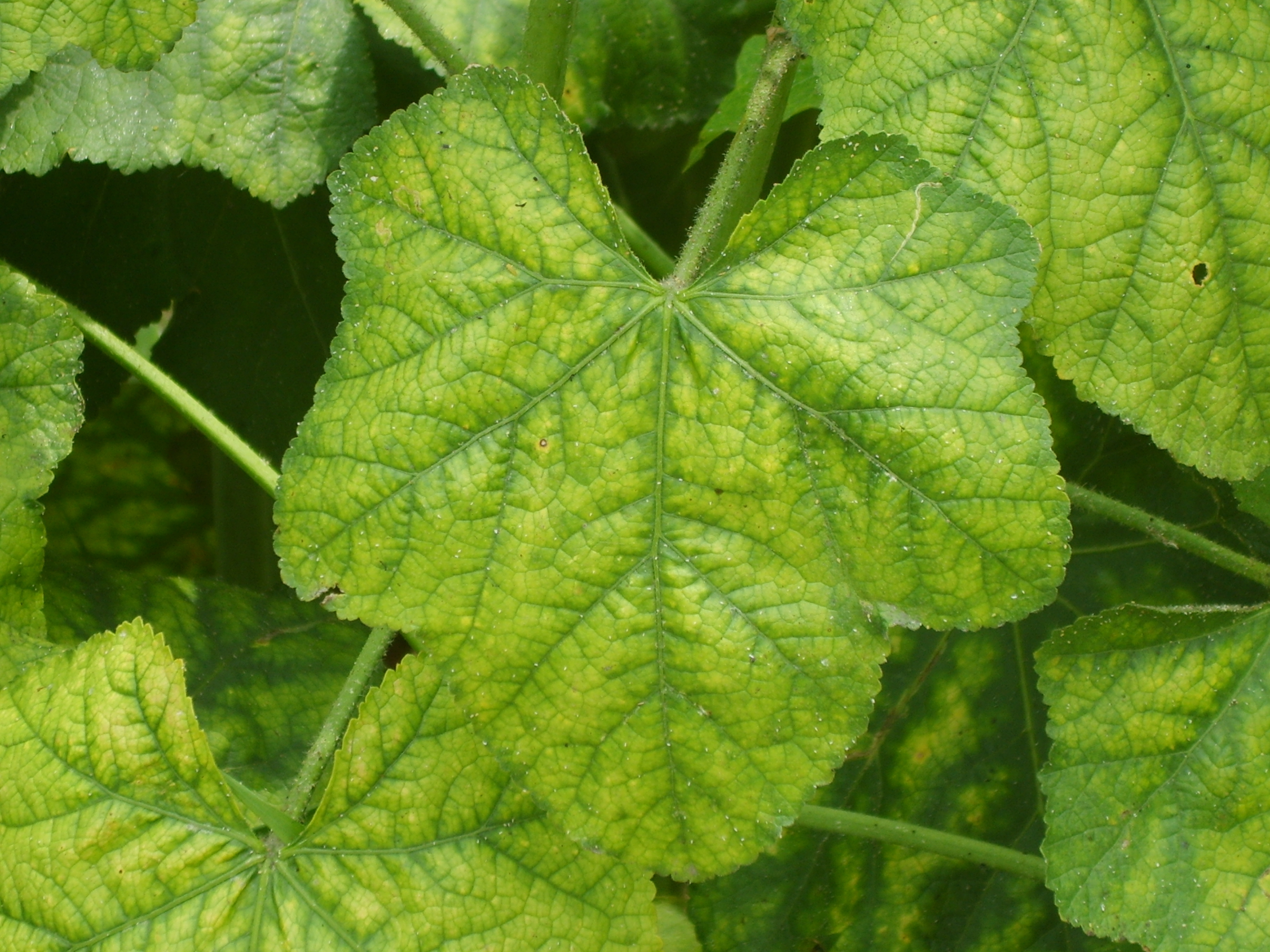
Partial chlorosis revealing palmate venation in simple leaves of Hibiscus mutabilis

== Edge ==
Leaf margins (edges) are frequently used in visual plant identification because they are usually consistent within a species or group of species, and are an easy characteristic to observe. Edge and margin are interchangeable in the sense that they both refer to the outside perimeter of a leaf.

Image	Term	Latin	Description
	entire	Forma integra	Even; with a smooth margin; without toothing
	ciliate	ciliatus	Fringed with hairs
	crenate	crenatus	Wavy-toothed; dentate with rounded teeth
	crenulate	crenulatus	Finely crenate
	crisped	crispus	Curly
	dentate	dentatus	Toothed; may be coarsely dentate, having large teeth or glandular dentate, having teeth which bear glands
	denticulate	denticulatus	Finely toothed
	doubly serrate	duplicato-dentatus	Each tooth bearing smaller teeth
	serrate	serratus	Saw-toothed; with asymmetrical teeth pointing forward
	serrulate	serrulatus	Finely serrate
	sinuate	sinuosus	With deep, wave-like indentations; coarsely crenate
	lobate	lobatus	Indented, with the indentations not reaching the center
	undulate	undulatus	With a wavy edge, shallower than sinuate
	spiny or pungent	spiculatus	With stiff, sharp points such as thistles

== Leaf folding ==
Leaves may also be folded, sculpted or rolled in various ways. If the leaves are initially folded in the bud, but later unrolls it is called vernation, ptyxis is the folding of an individual leaf in a bud.

Image	Term	Latin	Description
	carinate or keeled	carinatus	With a longitudinal ridge, keel-shaped
	conduplicate		Folded upwards, with the surfaces close to parallel
	cucullate		Forming a hood, margins and tip curved downward
	involute		Rolled upwards (towards the adaxial surface)
	plicate	plicatus	With parallel folds
	reduplicate		Folded downwards, with the surfaces close to parallel
	revolute		Rolled downwards (towards the abaxial surface)
	supervolute		Opposing left and right halves of lamina folded along longitudinal axis, with one half rolled completely within the other

== Latin descriptions ==
The Latin word for 'leaf', folium, is neuter. In descriptions of a single leaf, the neuter singular ending of the adjective is used, e.g. folium lanceolatum 'lanceolate leaf', folium lineare 'linear leaf'. In descriptions of multiple leaves, the neuter plural is used, e.g. folia linearia 'linear leaves'. Descriptions commonly refer to the plant using the ablative singular or plural, e.g. foliis ovatis 'with ovate leaves'.

== See also ==
- Glossary of botanical terms
- Glossary of plant morphology
- Cladophylls are leaf-like petioles
- Leaf size
- Sinus
- Leaflet (botany) and Rachis
- Petiole (botany) and Plant stem
- Phylloclades are flattened stems that resemble leaves
- Pinnation
- Plant morphology
- Taxonomy (biology)

== Bibliography ==
- Stearn, W.T. (2004). Botanical Latin (4th (p/b) ed.). Portland, Oregon: Timber Press. ISBN 978-0-7153-1643-6.
- "Leaves"., in Massey & Murphy (1996)
- "Shapes"., in Massey & Murphy (1996)
- Massey, Jimmy R.; Murphy, James C. (1996). "Vascular plant systematics". NC Botnet. University of North Carolina at Chapel Hill.
