= Eugenia oreophila =

Eugenia oreophila can refer to:

- Eugenia oreophila Ridl., a synonym of Syzygium oreophilum
- Eugenia oreophila Rech., a synonym of Syzygium brevifolium
- Eugenia oreophila Diels, a synonym of Myrcianthes oreophila
