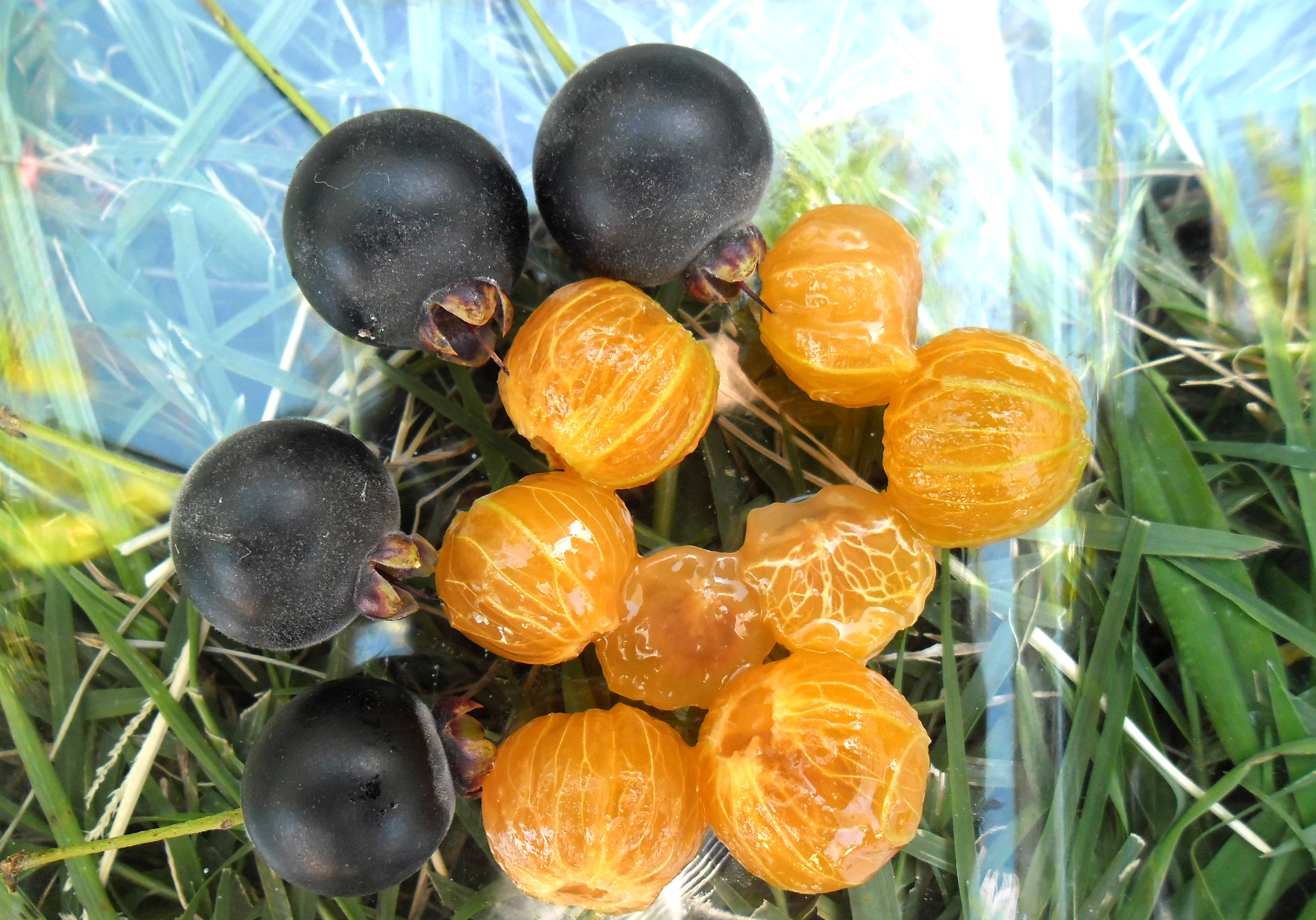

Conservation status
- Endangered (IUCN 2.3)

Scientific classification
- Kingdom: Plantae
- Clade: Tracheophytes
- Clade: Angiosperms
- Clade: Eudicots
- Clade: Rosids
- Order: Myrtales
- Family: Myrtaceae
- Genus: Myrcianthes
- Species: M. pungens

Binomial name
- Myrcianthes pungens (O.Berg) D.Legrand

Synonyms
- Acreugenia pungens (O.Berg) Kausel; Eugenia pungens O.Berg; Eugenia ybaviyu Parodi; Luma pungens (O.Berg) Herter

= Myrcianthes pungens =

Species of flowering plant

Myrcianthes pungens, the guabiyu, is a species of flowering plant in the family Myrtaceae. It is a tree native to northern Argentina, central and southern Brazil, Bolivia, Paraguay, and Uruguay.

The species was first described as Eugenia pungens by Otto Karl Berg in 1857. In 1968 Carlos Maria Diego Enrique Legrand placed the species in genus Myrcianthes as M. pungens.

== Description ==
Myrcianthes pungens is a medium sized tree, up to 10 m high, with a not very compact cup, with a lot of pubescent branches. The leaves are alternate, petiole, stiff, oval oblong, obtuse and acuminate, 4–7 cm, with a strong green color on the outside and lighter on the underside. It has rough bark of light brown color with abundant removable scales of the bark. Internally the bark has a whitish color, and when cut, emits a soft aroma. The flowers are tiny, whitish, abundant and aromatic.

It presents small, globose fruits, 1 cm in diameter, dark purple when they reach maturity, with sweet and edible pulp and a large seed. In the Southern Hemisphere, it blooms from September to October and bears from November to January. It is found in the Paraguayan departments of Guaira and Caaguazú and in the Cordillera department.

== Distribution ==
It is cultivated as an ornamental plant in parks and gardens, being able as a shrub for colorful fences. The leaves can be used scattered on the ground in areas where flies abound, since when crushed they release a resin that drives them away.

== Gallery ==
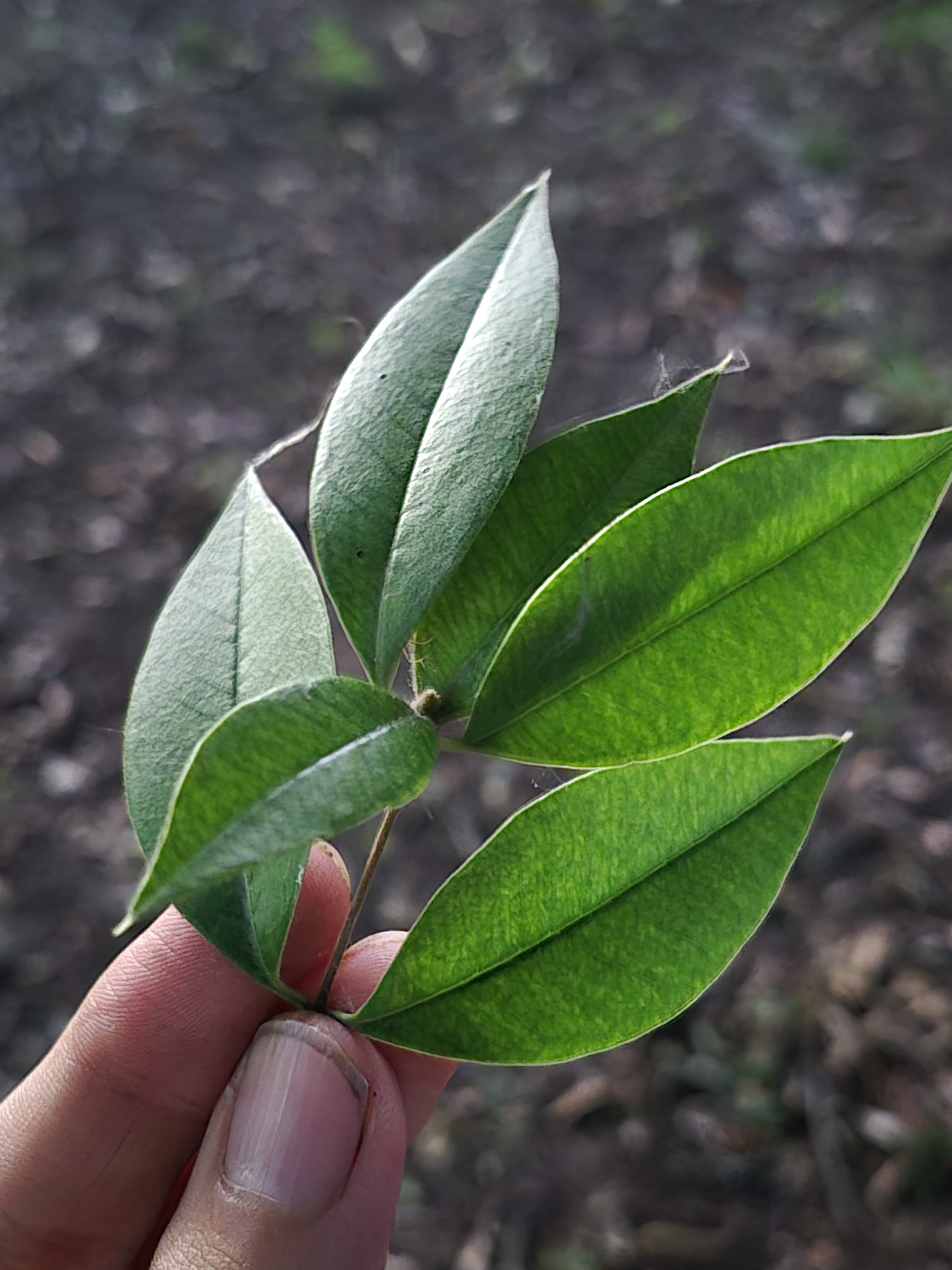
Leaves

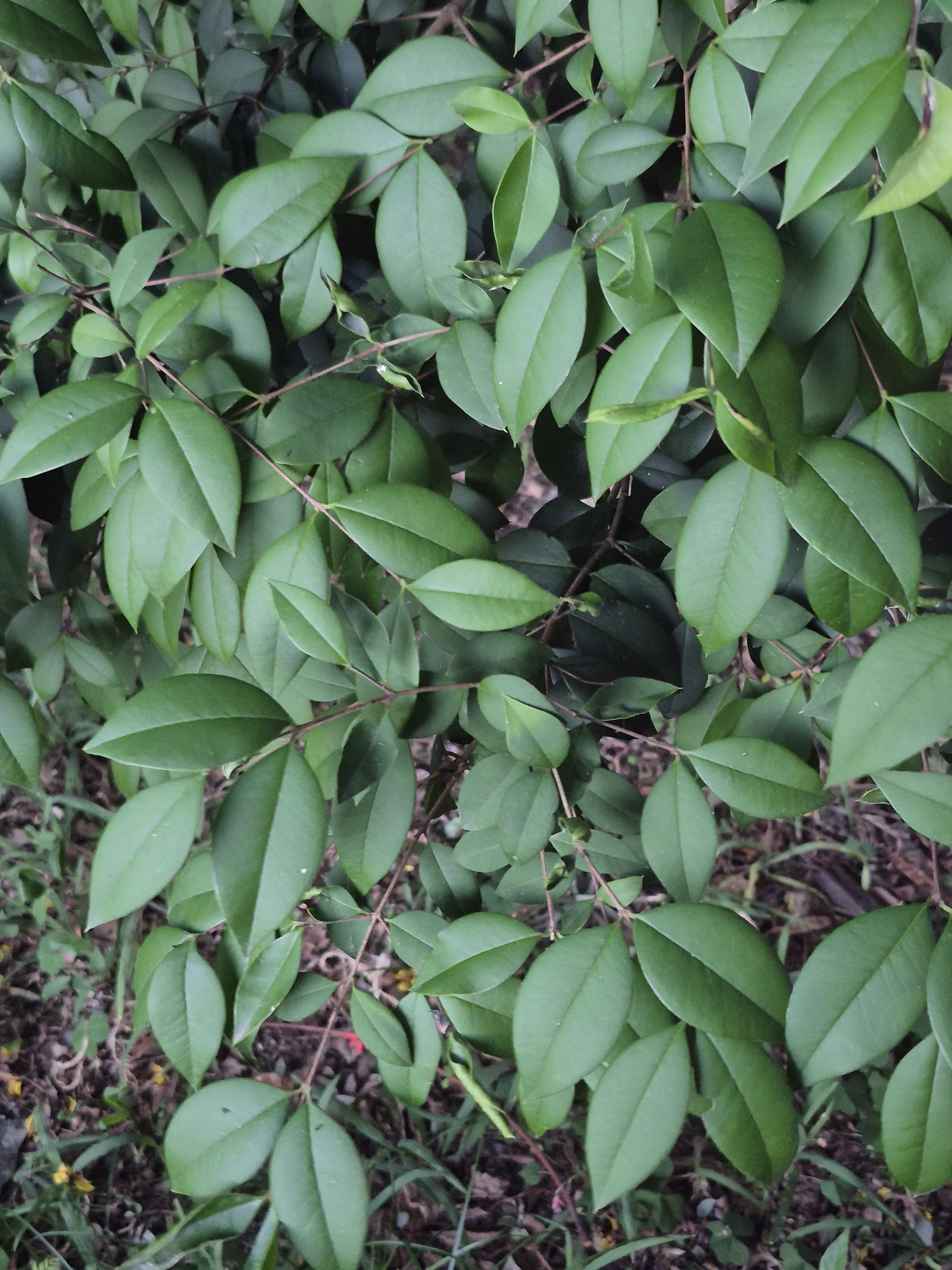

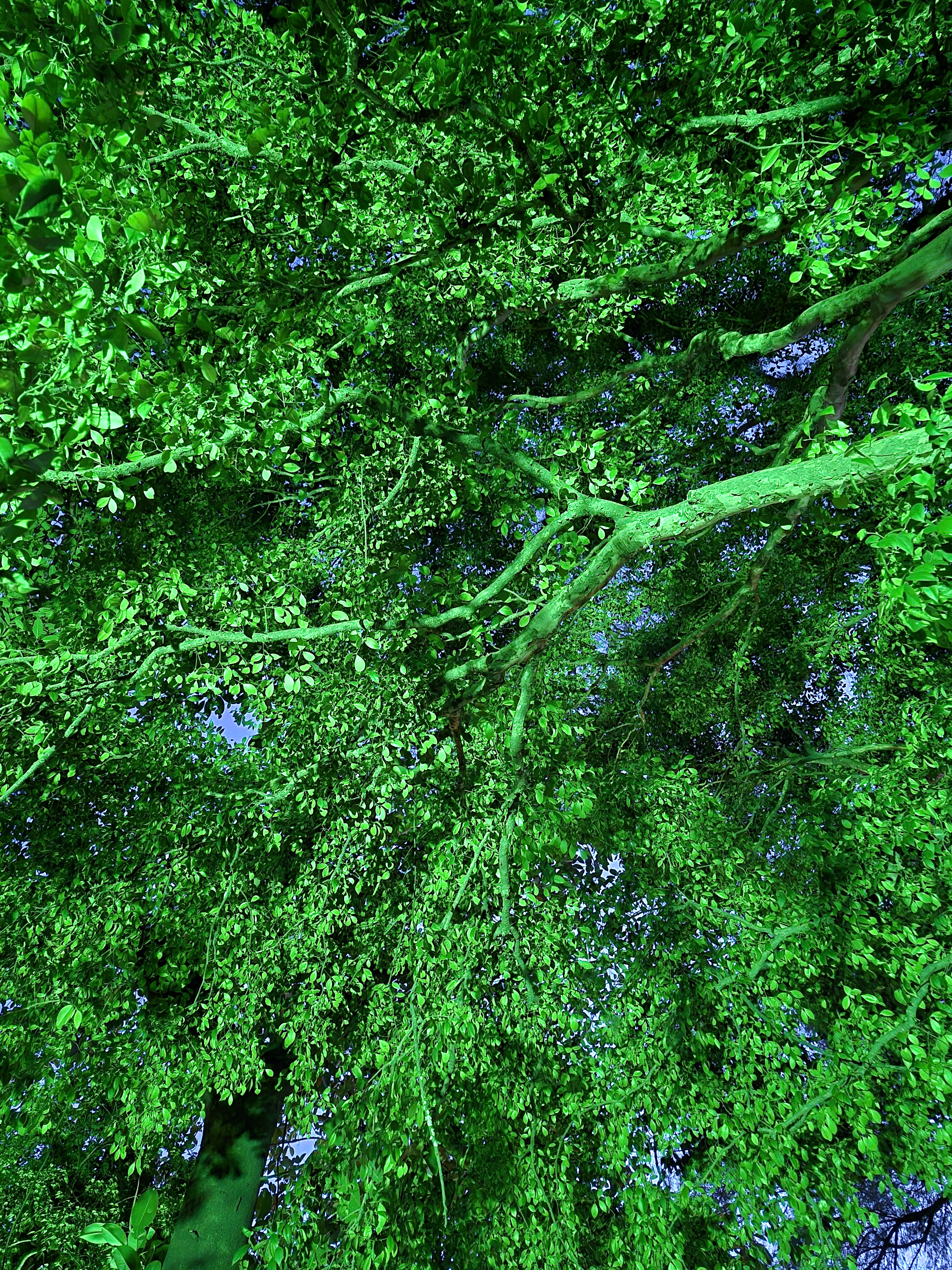
Tree

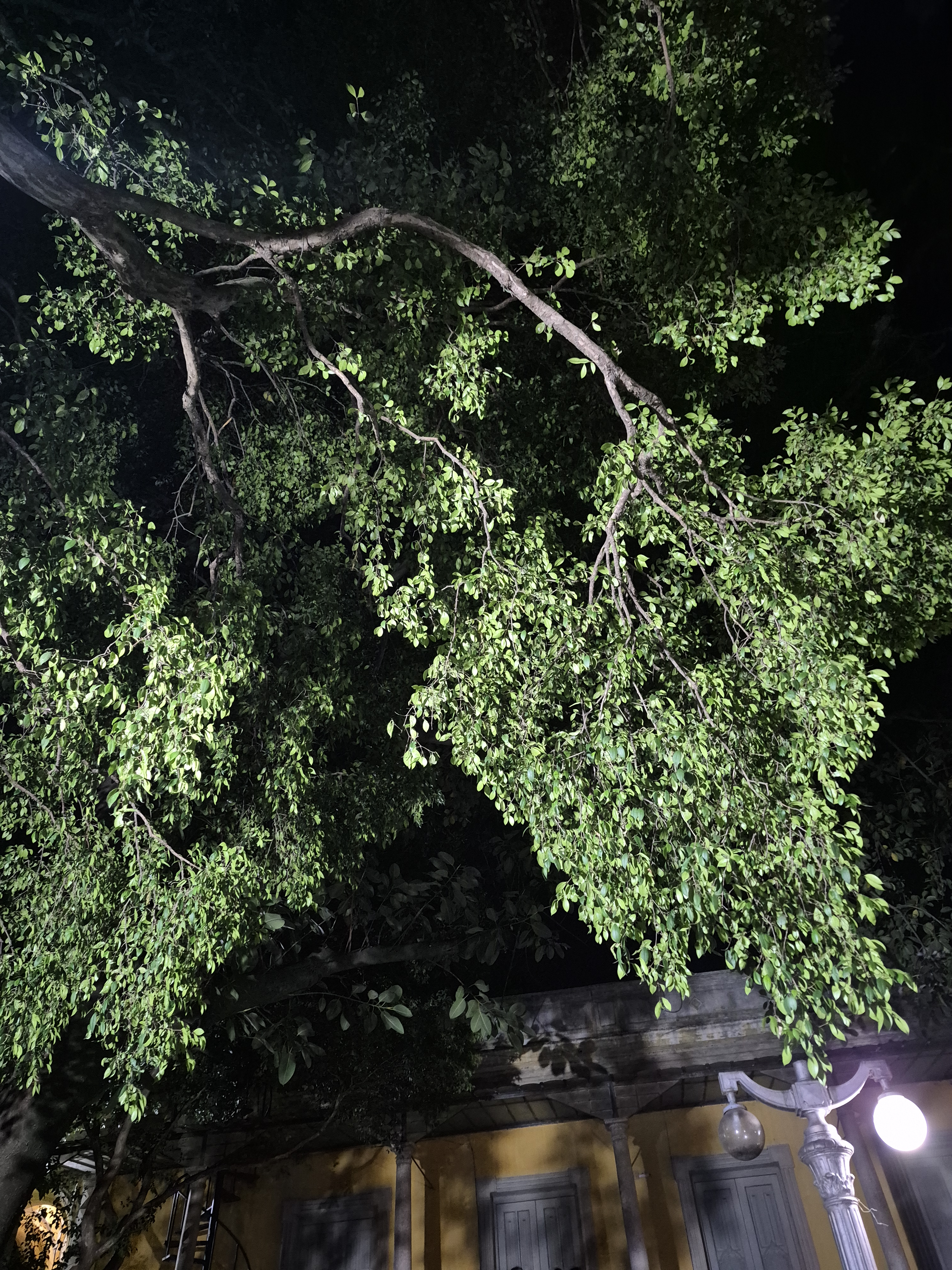
Branch

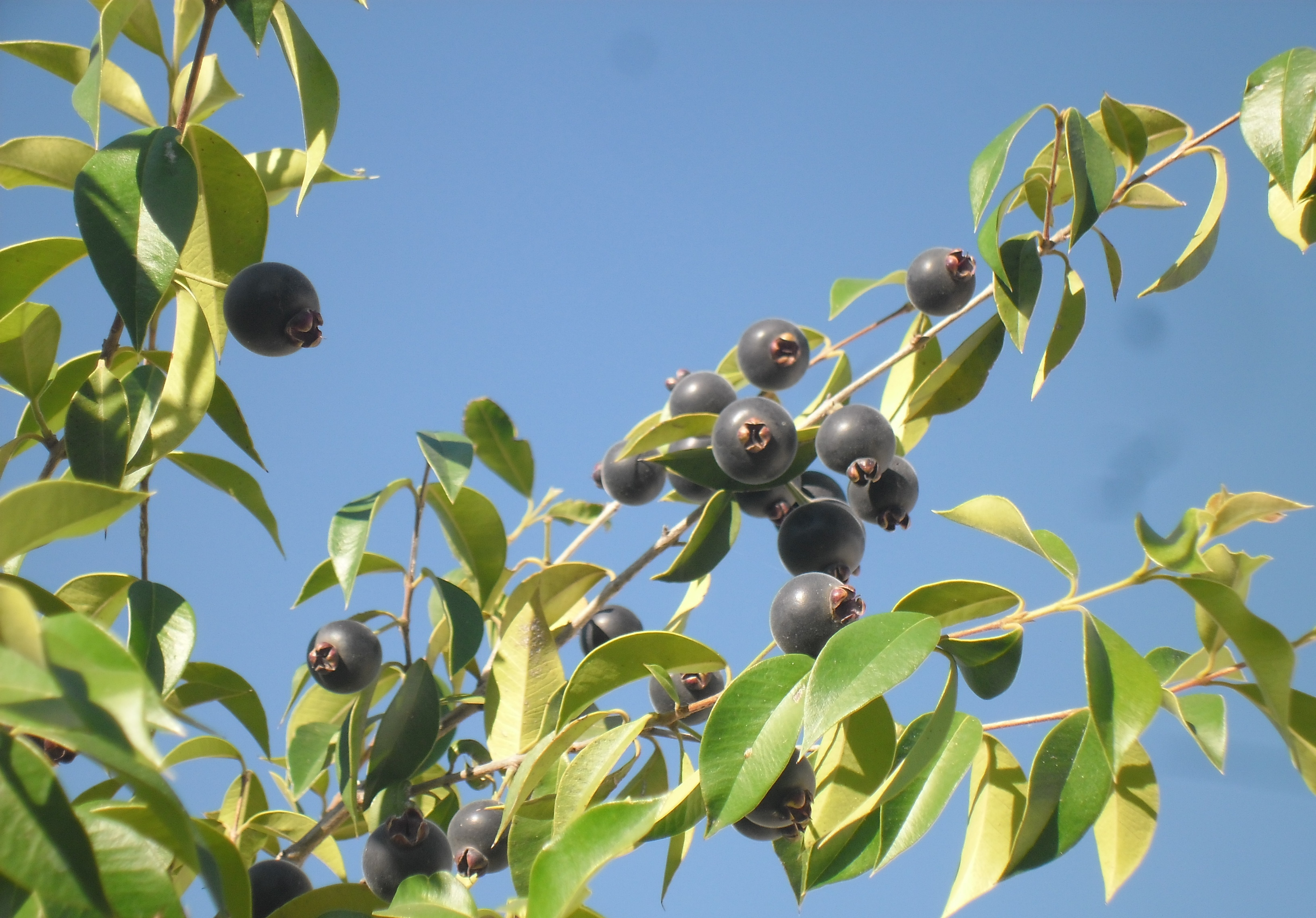
Fruits

== See also ==
- Myrcianthes coquimbensis
- Myrcianthes rhopaloides
