= P. poeppigii =

P. poeppigii may refer to:

- Perezia poeppigii, a South American aster
- Polyachyrus poeppigii, a South American daisy
- Pseudogynoxys poeppigii, a Peruvian sunflower
