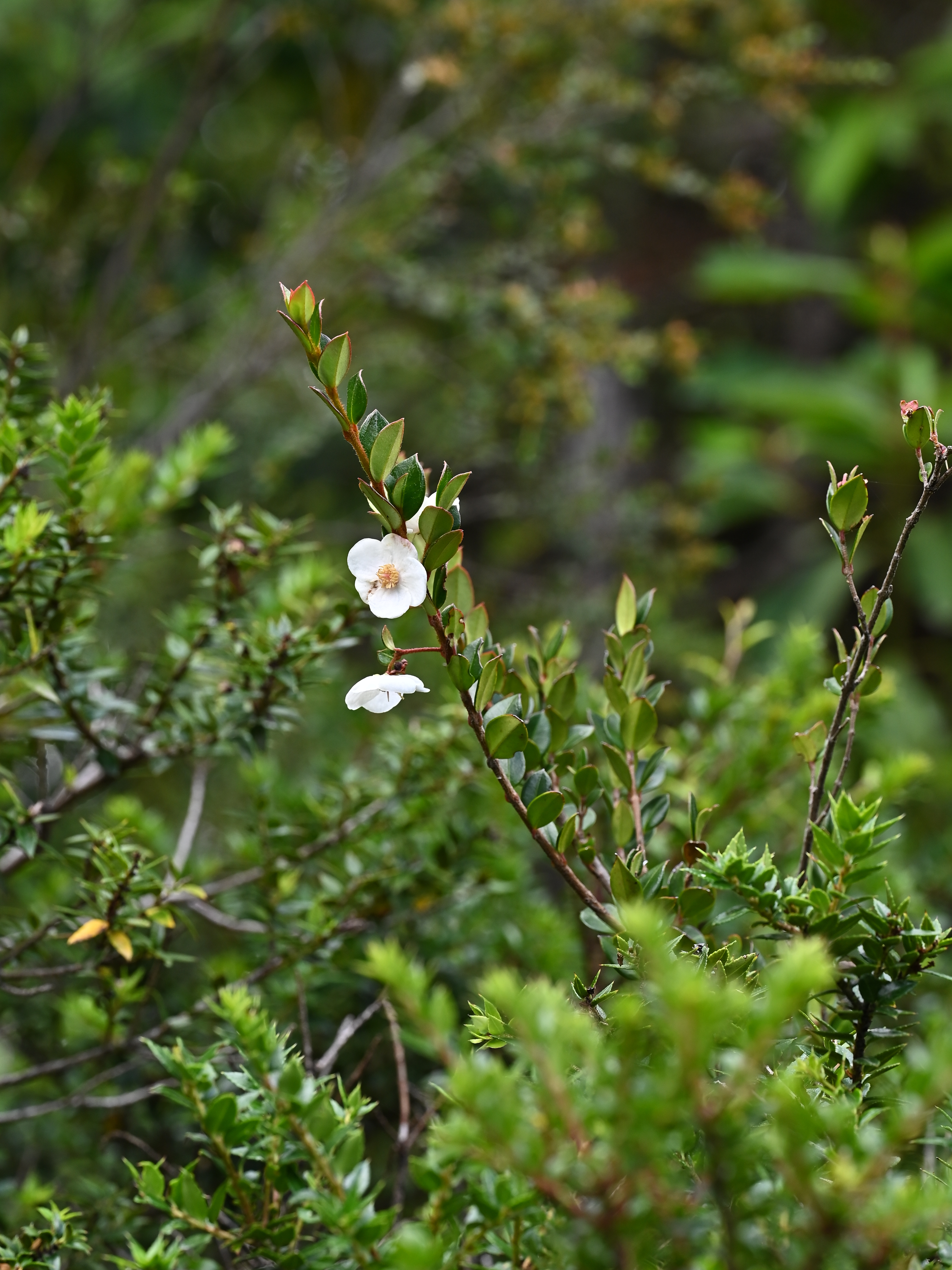
- Flowers
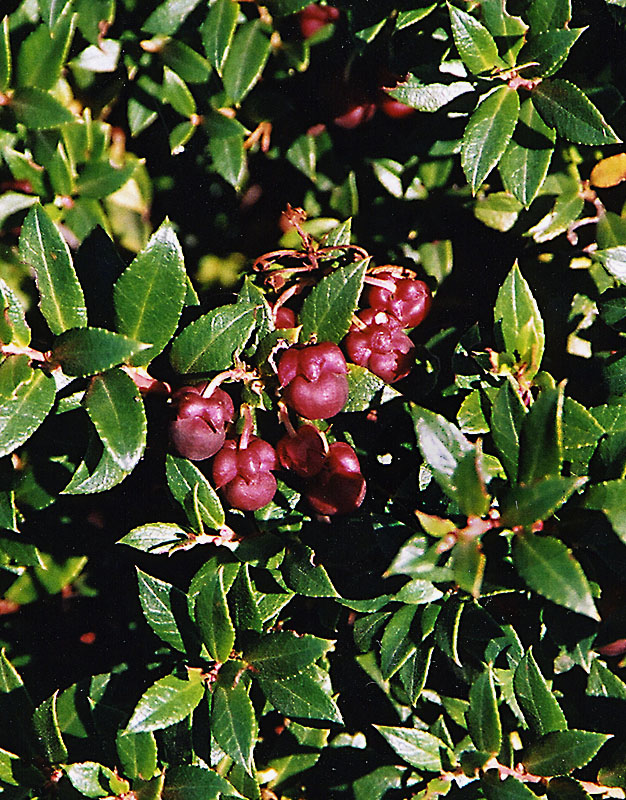
- Fruit

Scientific classification
- Kingdom: Plantae
- Clade: Embryophytes
- Clade: Tracheophytes
- Clade: Spermatophytes
- Clade: Angiosperms
- Clade: Eudicots
- Clade: Rosids
- Order: Myrtales
- Family: Myrtaceae
- Genus: Ugni
- Species: U. candollei

Binomial name
- Ugni candollei (Barnéoud) O.Berg

= Ugni candollei =

Species of shrub

Ugni candollei is a species of shrub, 80 cm in height, with white, 5-petal flowers, endemic to Chile. Its fruit is edible, and is used by natives to make a chicha. It is reported to be an oneirogen.

== Distribution ==
It is distributed between Maule Region and Los Lagos Region, also it can be found near the coast.

== See also ==
- Ugni molinae
