= Karl Friedrich Reiche =

German botanist (1860-1929)

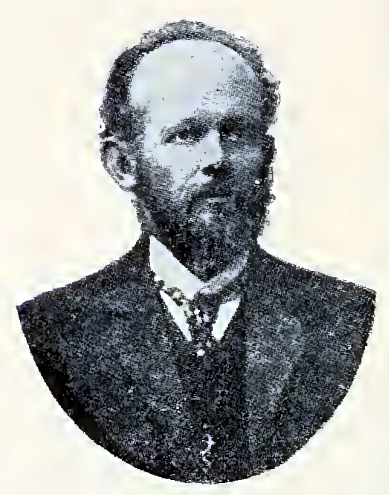
Karl Friedrich Reiche c. 1910

Karl Friedrich Reiche (Spanish: Carlos Reiche, October 31, 1860 – February 26, 1929) was a German botanist who worked as a university professor in Chile and Mexico.

== Life ==
Reiche was born in Dresden and earned his doctorate in 1885 in Leipzig. He worked as a professor in Dresden (1886-1889) and Constitución, Chile (1889-1896). He was a professor in Mexico, and he directed the botanical section of the Chilean National Museum of Natural History (Museo Nacional de Historia Natural de Chile) in Santiago de Chile from 1896 to 1911, while Rodolfo Amando Philippi was director. There he published in the Annals of the University of Chile and at the same time six volumes of the Estudios críticos de la Flora de Chile, work which remained unfinished. Although formally he was recognized as the only author of this work, probably he collaborated with Federico Philippi and F. Johow. He wrote the entries to many plant families in the work Die natürlichen Pflanzenfamilien by Adolf Engler and Carl Prantl in the first edition (1890–1897).

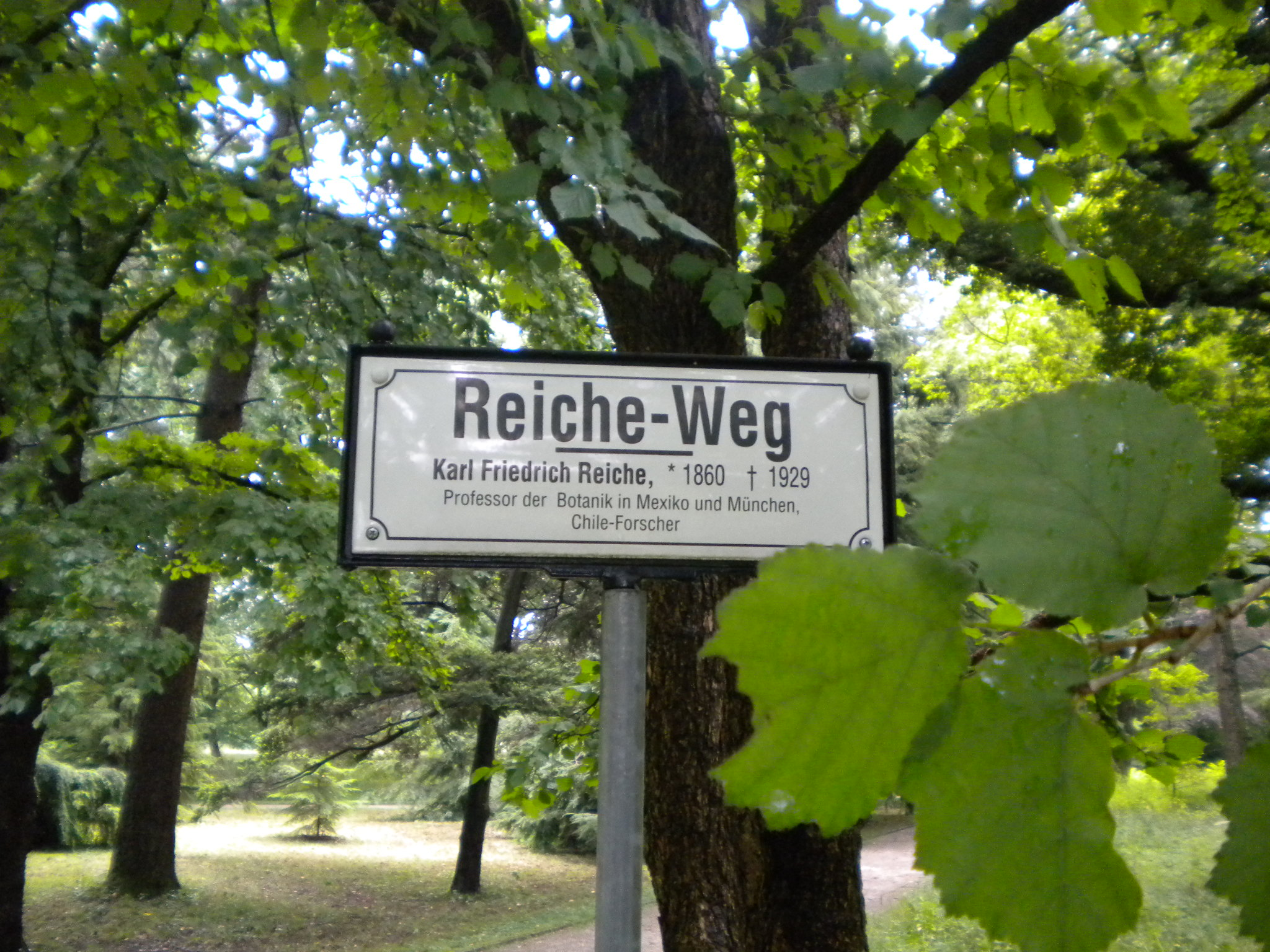
Name of a path in Nymphenburg Munich Botanical Garden

Upon leaving the museum, he assumed a post as professor of botany in the Escuela Nacional de Altos Estudios in México (1911-1923). He became a corresponding member of the German Botanical Society (Deutschen Botanischen Gesellschaft) in 1911. From 1924 he worked in Munich, as an independent investigator of the Botanische Staatssammlung München. In 1926 he returned to Mexico to complete his work and take a job as emprendido for the Chilean flora. In 1928 he directed the phanerogamy section of the Botanischer Garten München-Nymphenburg. He died in Munich in 1929.

The plant genus Reichea (Myrcianthes today) in family Myrtaceae, Reicheocactus in family Cactaceae, and Reicheella in family Caryophyllaceae are named for him. A type of frog Arthroleptis reichei, sometimes known as 'Reiche's squeaker', is also named after him.

== Writings ==
- Grundzüge der Pflanzenverbreitung in Chile, Leipzig, 1907 (Reprint Gantner: Vaduz, 1976). ("Die Vegetation der Erde"; 8) Available online at Internet archive
- '"Kreuz und quer durch Mexiko" in Wanderbuch eines deutschen Gelehrten. Leipzig: Deutsche Buchwerkstätten GmbH 1930.
- "Estudios críticos de la Flora de Chile." Anales de Universidad de Chile, 1894–1911. Available online at http://www.efloras.org/
- Geografía botánica de Chile, 1934
- La vegetación de los alrededores de la capital de México, 1924
- Flora excursoria en el Valle Central de México, 1926

== Sources ==
- H. Ross: Karl Reiche. In: Berichte der deutschen Botanischen Gesellschaft 47, 1929, Generalversammlung-Heft.
- Robert Zander. Handwörterbuch der Pflanzennamen. Fritz Encke, Günther Buchheim, Siegmund Seybold, eds. Vol. 13. Stuttgart: Ulmer Verlag, 1984. ISBN 3-8001-5042-5
- (in Spanish) biographical notes biografiasyvidas.com
- Abstract to Grundzüge der Pflanzenverbreitung in Chile (from New Zealand National Library)
- Gunckel H. 1961. "Sesquicentenario de la Independencia nacional Centenario del Nacimiento del sabio botánico Dr. Carlos Reiche." Revista Universitaria 67-70.

This article is based on translations of articles from the Spanish Wikipedia and the German Wikipedia.
