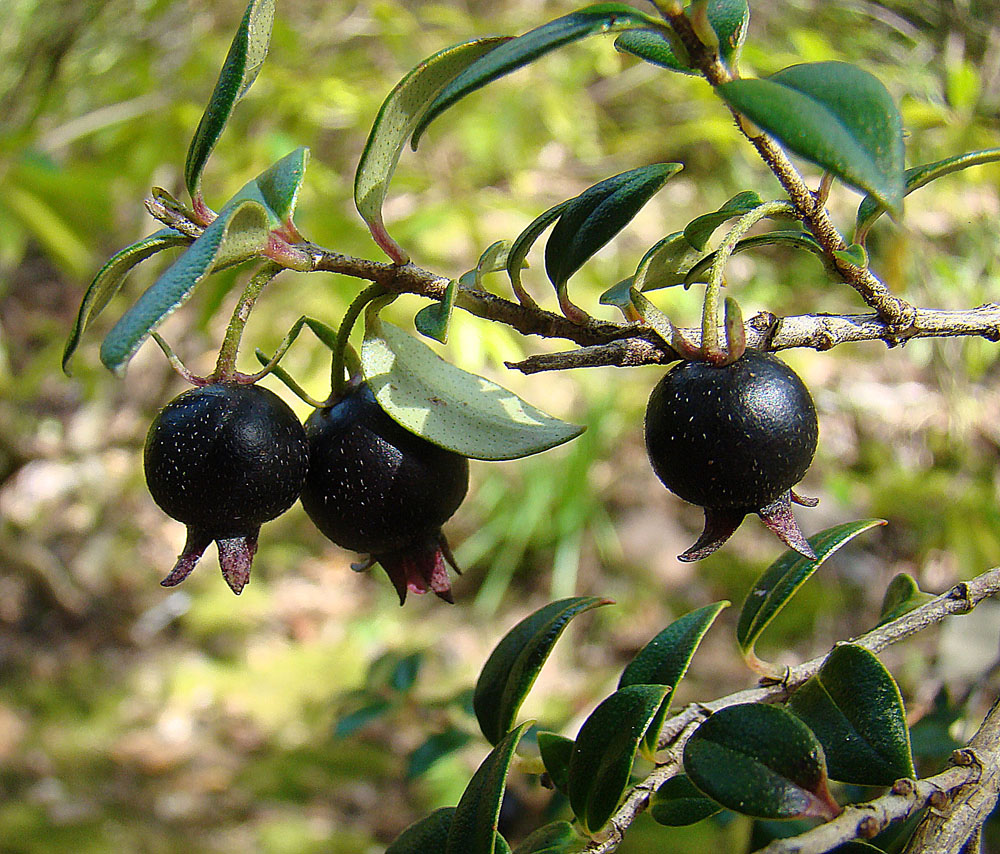

Conservation status
- Least Concern (IUCN 3.1)

Scientific classification
- Kingdom: Plantae
- Clade: Tracheophytes
- Clade: Angiosperms
- Clade: Eudicots
- Clade: Rosids
- Order: Myrtales
- Family: Myrtaceae
- Genus: Ugni
- Species: U. myricoides

Binomial name
- Ugni myricoides (Kunth) O.Berg (1856)

Synonyms
- Synonymy: Eugenia friedrichsthalii (O.Berg) Hemsl.; Eugenia warszewiczii (O.Berg) Hemsl.; Myrtus friedrichsthalii (O.Berg) Donn.Sm. & Standl.; Myrtus friedrichsthalii var. brevipes Donn.Sm.; Myrtus matudae Lundell; Myrtus montana Benth.; Myrtus myricoides Kunth; Myrtus myricoides var. roraimensis (N.E.Br.) Steyerm.; Myrtus myricoides var. stenophylla (Oliv.) Steyerm.; Myrtus myricoides var. turumiquirensis Steyerm.; Myrtus oerstedii (O.Berg) Hemsl.; Myrtus roraimensis N.E.Br.; Myrtus stenophylla Oliv.; Ugni angustifolia Burret; Ugni disterigmoides Ant.Molina; Ugni friedrichsthalii O.Berg; Ugni friedrichsthalii var. brevipes O.Berg; Ugni friedrichsthalii var. longipes O.Berg; Ugni montana (Benth.) O.Berg; Ugni myricoides f. bifaria McVaugh; Ugni myricoides f. grossa McVaugh; Ugni myricoides var. longipes (O.Berg) McVaugh; Ugni myricoides var. oerstedii (O.Berg) McVaugh; Ugni myricoides f. oligandra McVaugh; Ugni myricoides var. roraimensis (N.E.Br.) McVaugh; Ugni myricoides f. stenophylla (Oliv.) McVaugh; Ugni oerstedii O.Berg; Ugni roraimensis (N.E.Br.) Burret; Ugni stenophylla (Oliv.) Burret; Ugni vaccinioides Burret; Ugni warscewiczii O.Berg

= Ugni myricoides =

Species of shrub

Ugni myricoides is a species of shrub or small tree native to the tropical Americas, ranging from Mexico (Hidalgo, Veracruz, Puebla, Oaxaca, Chiapas) to Central America and South America (Guyana, Venezuela, Colombia, Ecuador, Peru, NW Brazil (Amazonas + Roraima)).

== Gallery ==
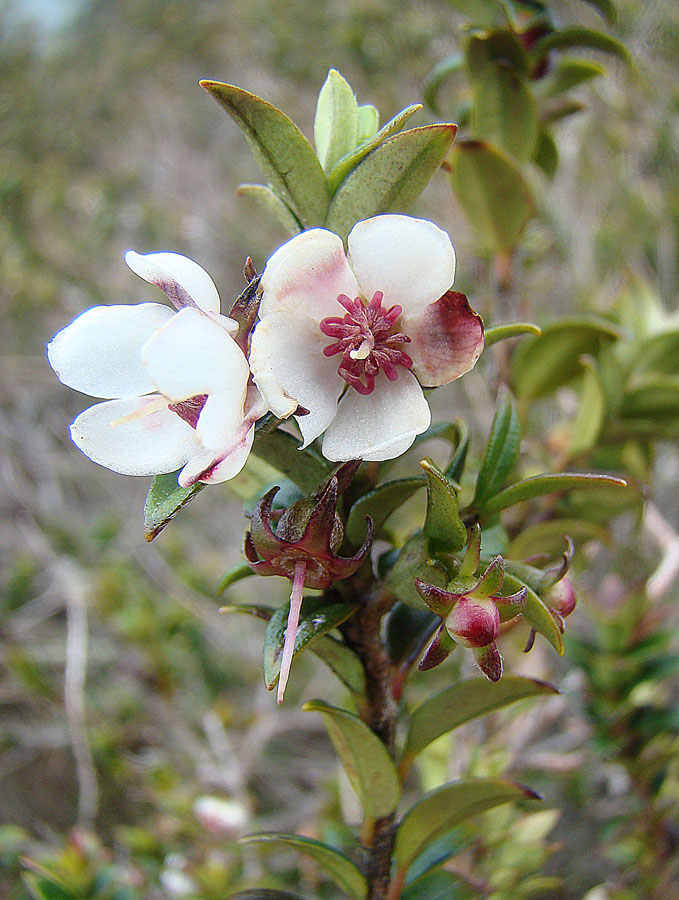

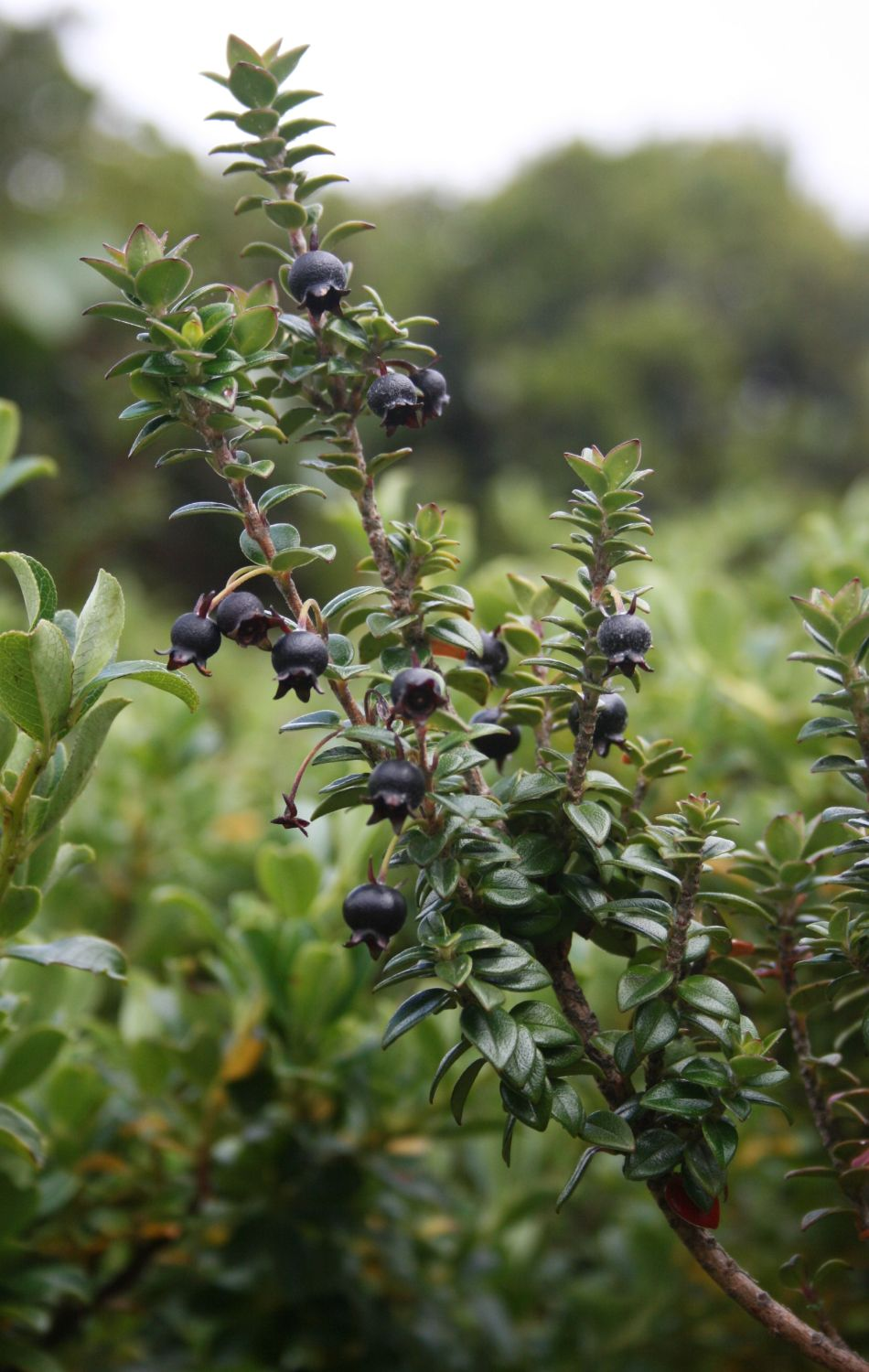

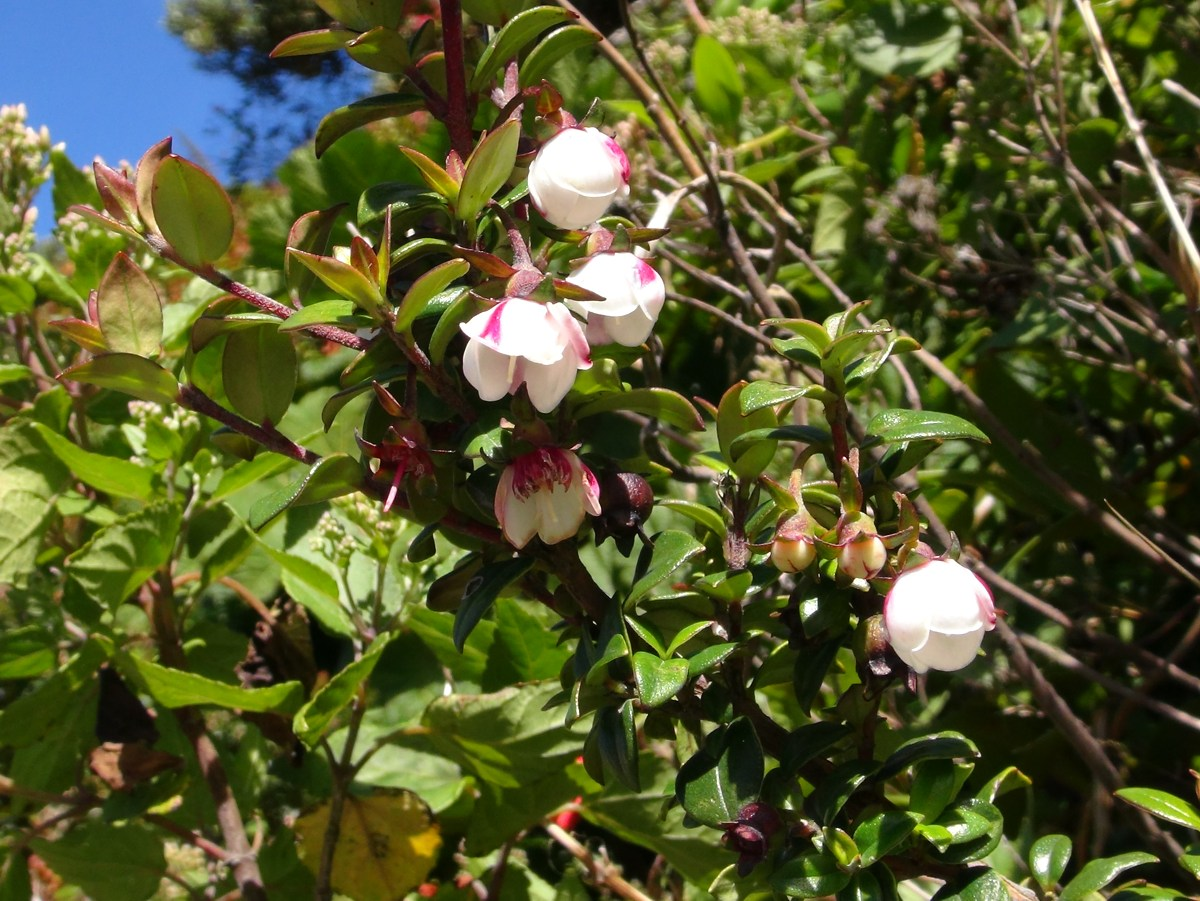
