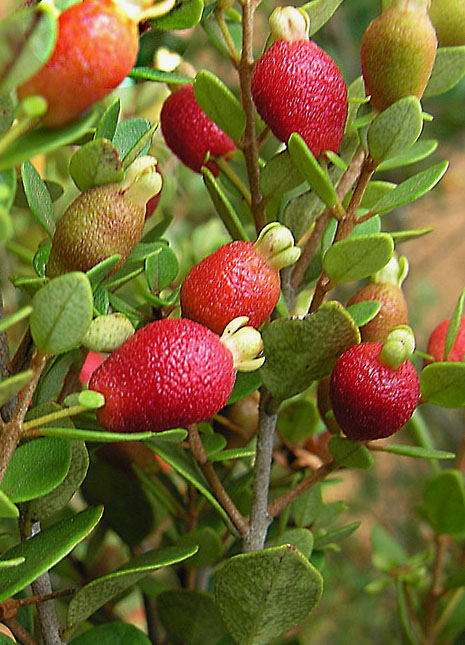

Conservation status
- Least Concern (IUCN 3.1)

Scientific classification
- Kingdom: Plantae
- Clade: Tracheophytes
- Clade: Angiosperms
- Clade: Eudicots
- Clade: Rosids
- Order: Myrtales
- Family: Myrtaceae
- Genus: Myrceugenia
- Species: M. obtusa

Binomial name
- Myrceugenia obtusa (DC.) O.Berg

Synonyms
- Eugenia obtusa DC.; Eugenia polyantha Phil.; Eugenia raran (Colla) Barnéoud; Luma obtusa (DC.) A.Gray; Myrceugenia chilensis O.Berg, nom. illeg. superfl.; Myrceugenia obtusa var. berteroana O.Berg; Myrceugenia obtusa var. polyantha (Phil.) O.Berg; Myrceugenia obtusa var. raran (Colla) O.Berg; Myrtus raran Colla

= Myrceugenia obtusa =

Species of plant

Myrceugenia obtusa, also known as raran, is an evergreen shrub or tree endemic to central Chile. It ranges from Coquimbo to Cautin (31 to 38°S), where it grows mainly in the coastal mountains on moist sites.

== Description ==
It is an evergreen small tree or shrub that measures up to 8 m (26 ft) tall, greyish bark, newly shoots are reddish and hairy, opposite and leathery leaves with the entire margin, and elliptical to aovate shaped, acute, obtuse and roundish apex. The leaves are 1.3 cm long and 0.6-2.5 cm wide, dark green above and pale green below, glabrous or somewhat pubescent. They possess glands that look like dots.

The flowers are hermaphrodite, solitary and axillary, 4 sepals fused at the base and 4 with free petals. The stamen are very numerous: they vary 90-190 and 4–8 mm long, a style about 5–7 mm long. The fruit is a globose berry, black when mature. Within it there are 3-4 seeds about 4–5 mm long.

== Cultivation and uses ==
It is planted as an ornamental tree in Chile. Edible fruit.

== See also ==
- Myrcianthes coquimbensis
- Myrteola nummularia
- Ugni molinae
