= Murta con membrillo =

- Course: Dessert
- Place of origin: Chile
- Main ingredients: Quince, Chilean guava berries, sugar

Murta con membrillo (English: Chilean guava (Ugni molinae) with quince) is a typical dessert from southern Chile where the Chilean guava shrub is common. It is made by boiling the quince and Chilean guava berries together with sugar.
