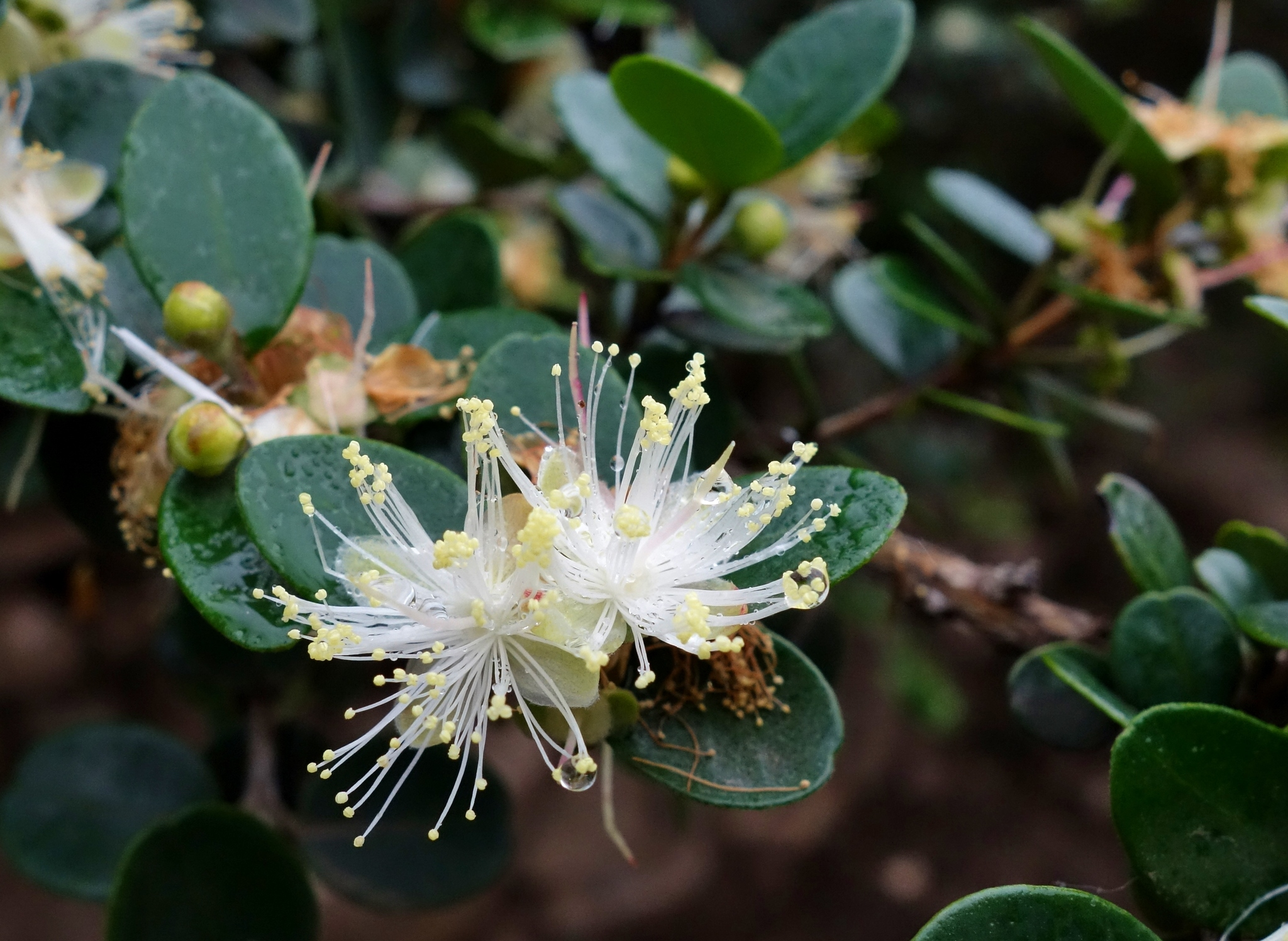

Conservation status
- Critically Endangered (IUCN 3.1)

Scientific classification
- Kingdom: Plantae
- Clade: Tracheophytes
- Clade: Angiosperms
- Clade: Eudicots
- Clade: Rosids
- Order: Myrtales
- Family: Myrtaceae
- Genus: Myrcianthes
- Species: M. ferreyrae

Binomial name
- Myrcianthes ferreyrae McVaugh

= Myrcianthes ferreyrae =

Species of plant

Myrcianthes ferreyrae is a species of tree in the family Myrtaceae. It is endemic to the lomas, or fog oases, found on the coastal hills of the region of Arequipa, Peru.
