= Myrcianthes callicoma =

Conservation status
- Vulnerable (IUCN 2.3)

Scientific classification
- Kingdom: Plantae
- Clade: Tracheophytes
- Clade: Angiosperms
- Clade: Eudicots
- Clade: Rosids
- Order: Myrtales
- Family: Myrtaceae
- Genus: Myrcianthes
- Species: M. callicoma

Binomial name
- Myrcianthes callicoma McVaugh

Species of flowering plant

Myrcianthes callicoma is a species of flowering plant in the family Myrtaceae. It is a tree native to Tucumán Province of northwestern Argentina and to southern Bolivia.

The species was described by Rogers McVaugh in 1963.
