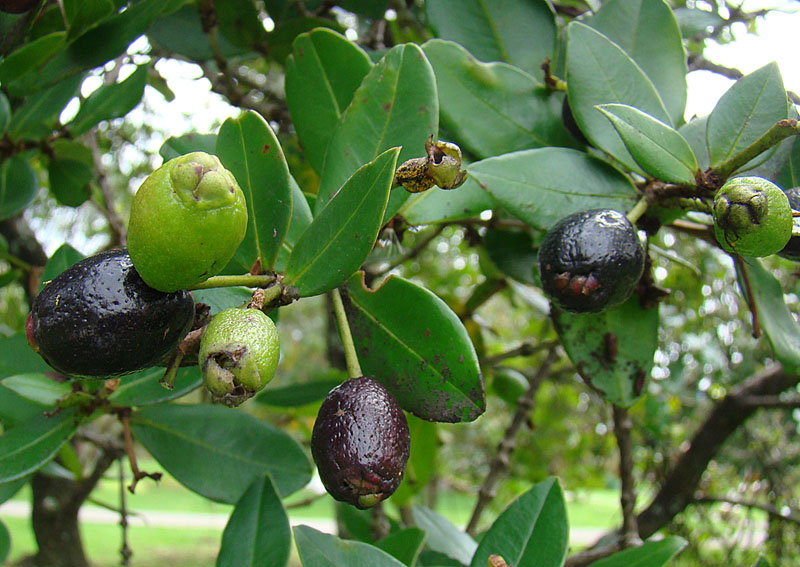

Conservation status
- Least Concern (IUCN 3.1)

Scientific classification
- Kingdom: Plantae
- Clade: Tracheophytes
- Clade: Angiosperms
- Clade: Eudicots
- Clade: Rosids
- Order: Myrtales
- Family: Myrtaceae
- Genus: Myrcianthes
- Species: M. rhopaloides

Binomial name
- Myrcianthes rhopaloides (Kunth) McVaugh

Synonyms
- Eugenia rhopaloides (Kunth) DC.; Eugenia coccolobifolia (Kunth) Burret; Eugenia mariquitensis O.Berg; Eugenia porphyroclada O.Berg; Myrcia coccolobifolia (Kunth) DC.; Myrtus coccolobifolia Kunth; Myrtus rhopaloides Kunth; Pseudocaryophyllus coccolobifolius (Kunth) O.Berg

= Myrcianthes rhopaloides =

Species of tree

Myrcianthes rhopaloides, commonly known as arrayán, is a species of flowering plant in the family Myrtaceae. It is a shrub or tree native to Venezuela, Colombia, Ecuador, Peru, and Bolivia in South America. It grows up to 15 metres tall and produces edible fruit. It grows in Andean montane tropical moist forests and cloud forests, including in the Northwestern Andean montane forests, Eastern Cordillera Real montane forests, and Bolivian Yungas ecoregions, from 1,500 to 3,200 metres elevation.

The species was first described as Myrtus rhopaloides by Carl Sigismund Kunth in 1823. In 1958 Rogers McVaugh placed the species in genus Myrcianthes as M. rhopaloides.

== See also ==
- Myrcianthes coquimbensis
