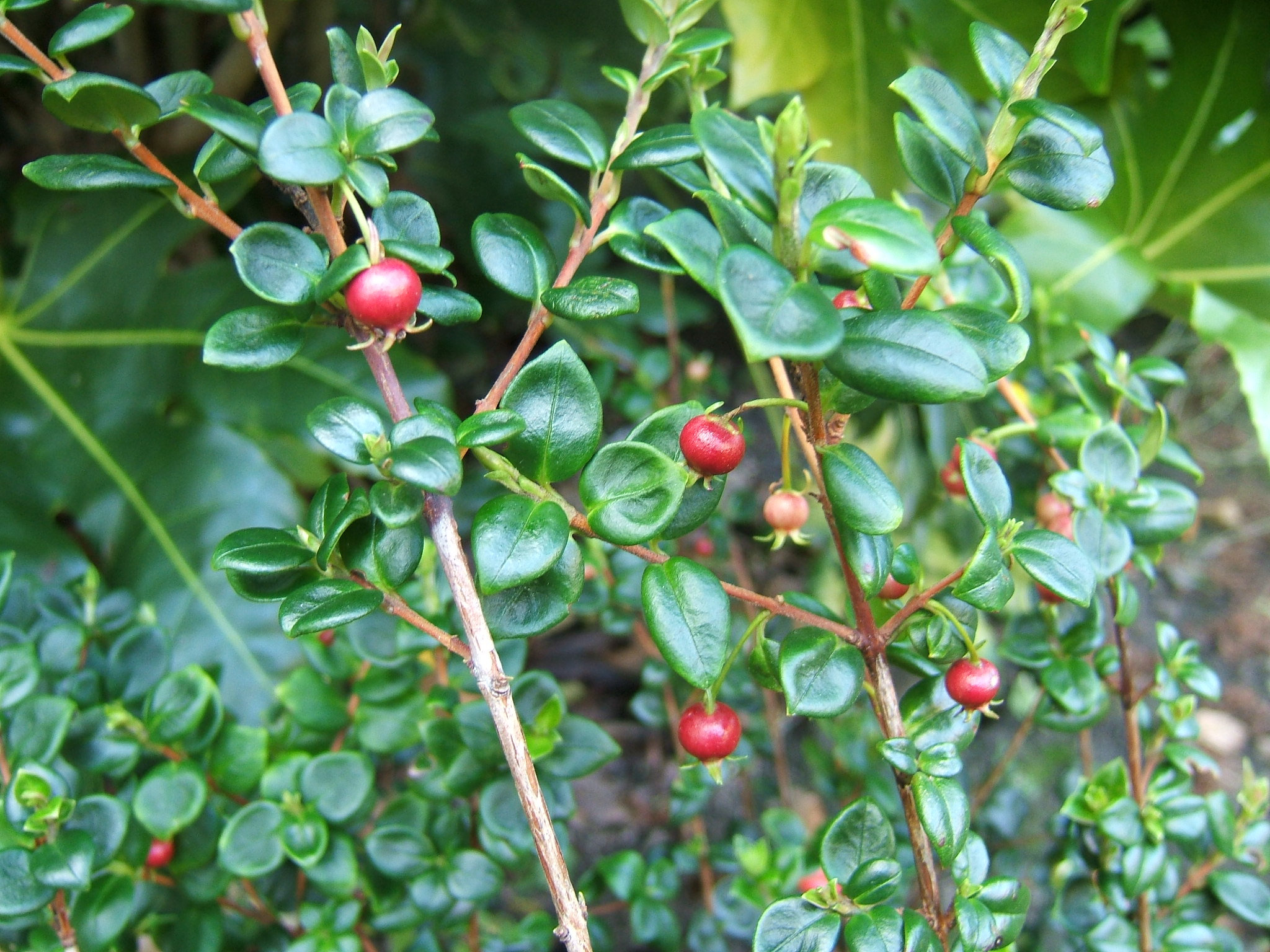

Scientific classification
- Kingdom: Plantae
- Clade: Embryophytes
- Clade: Tracheophytes
- Clade: Spermatophytes
- Clade: Angiosperms
- Clade: Eudicots
- Clade: Rosids
- Order: Myrtales
- Family: Myrtaceae
- Genus: Ugni
- Species: U. molinae

Binomial name
- Ugni molinae Turcz.

Synonyms
- Eugenia ugni Hook. & Arn.; Myrtus molinae Barnéoud ex Gay; Myrtus ugni Molina

= Ugni molinae =

Species of shrub

Ugni molinae, commonly known as Chilean guava berry, or strawberry myrtle, is a shrub native to Chile and adjacent regions of southern Argentina. The local Spanish name is murta, and the Mapuche Native American name is "uñi". It is in the same botanical family as the guava, in Myrtaceae.

The fruit is sometimes marketed as "Ugniberry", as "New Zealand cranberry" in New Zealand, and the name "Tazziberry" has been trademarked in Australia, but it is not a native plant to these countries.

== Description ==
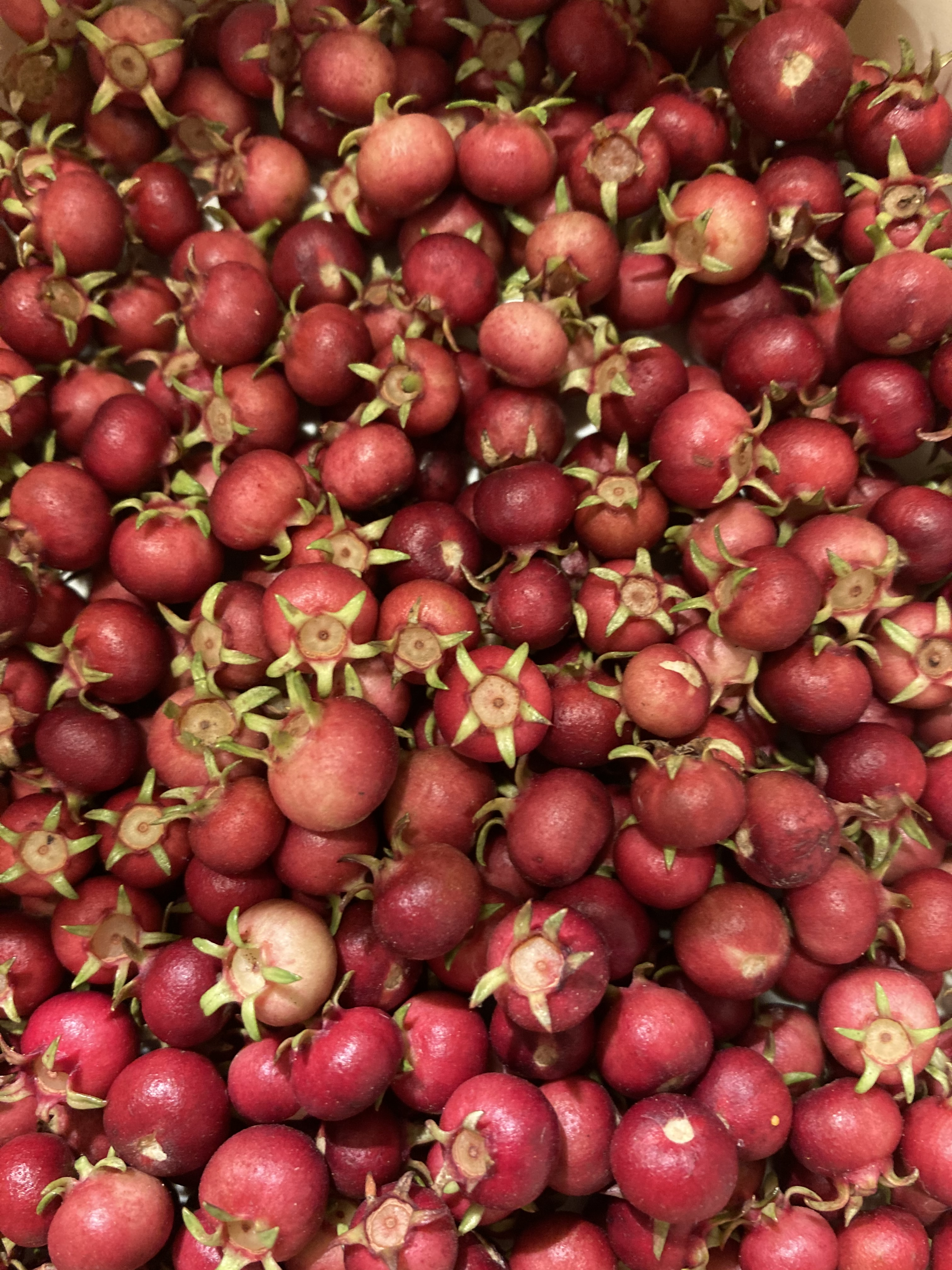
Berries picked and destalked ready for cooking

Ugni is a shrub from 30 cm to 170 cm tall with evergreen foliage. In some exceptional cases, the shrub can grow up to 3 m in height. The leaves are opposite, oval, 1–2 cm long and 1-1.5 cm broad, entire, glossy dark green, with a spicy scent if crushed. The flowers are drooping, 1 cm diameter with four or five white or pale pink petals and numerous short stamens; the fruit is a small red, white or purple berry 1 cm diameter. In its natural habitat, the Valdivian temperate rain forests, the fruit matures in autumn from March to May.

== History ==
It was first described by Juan Ignacio Molina (hence its name) in 1782. It was introduced to England in 1844 by the botanist and plant collector William Lobb, where it became a favorite fruit of Queen Victoria. It is also grown as an ornamental plant.

Sometime prior to 1896 Ugni molinae was introduced to Robinson Crusoe Island where it became an invasive species colonizing open patches and forming dense brushes.

The fruit is cultivated to a small extent. The usage of the fruit in cuisine is limited to southern Chile where it grows natively as well as in small-scale commercial agriculture in New Zealand. It is used to make the traditional liqueur Murtado that is made of aguardiente and sugar flavoured by conserving murtas inside the bottle. It is also used to make jam and the murta con membrillo dessert and in Kuchen.

Considered an invasive species in the Juan Fernandez Islands, the Juan Fernandez Women's Group has led efforts to support local women to harvest the berries and create products to sell with them.

== See also ==
- Myrcianthes coquimbensis
- Myrteola nummularia
- Myrceugenia obtusa
- Empetrum rubrum
- Aristotelia chilensis
- Austromyrtus dulcis
