= Reicheella =

Scientific classification
- Kingdom: Plantae
- Clade: Tracheophytes
- Clade: Angiosperms
- Clade: Eudicots
- Order: Caryophyllales
- Family: Caryophyllaceae
- Genus: Reicheella; Pax (1900)
- Species: R. andicola

Binomial name
- Reicheella andicola (Phil.) Pax (1900)

Synonyms
- Bryopsis Reiche (1895), nom. illeg.; Bryopsis andicola (Phil.) Reiche (1895); Lyallia andicola Phil. (1891)

Species of flowering plant

Reicheella is a genus of flowering plants belonging to the family Caryophyllaceae. It has a synonym of Bryopsis Reiche, and only contains one known species, Reicheella andicola (Phil.) Pax

Its native range is northern Chile.

The genus name of Reicheella is in honour of Karl Friedrich Reiche (1860–1929), a German botanist who worked as a university professor in Chile and Mexico. The Latin specific epithet of andicola is a compound word; with 'Andi-' meaning the Andes and also the Latin cola for "dweller" (from colere "to dwell"). It was first described and published in H.G.A.Engler & K.A.E.Prantl, Nat. Pflanzenfam., Nachtr. Vol.2 on page 21 in 1900.
