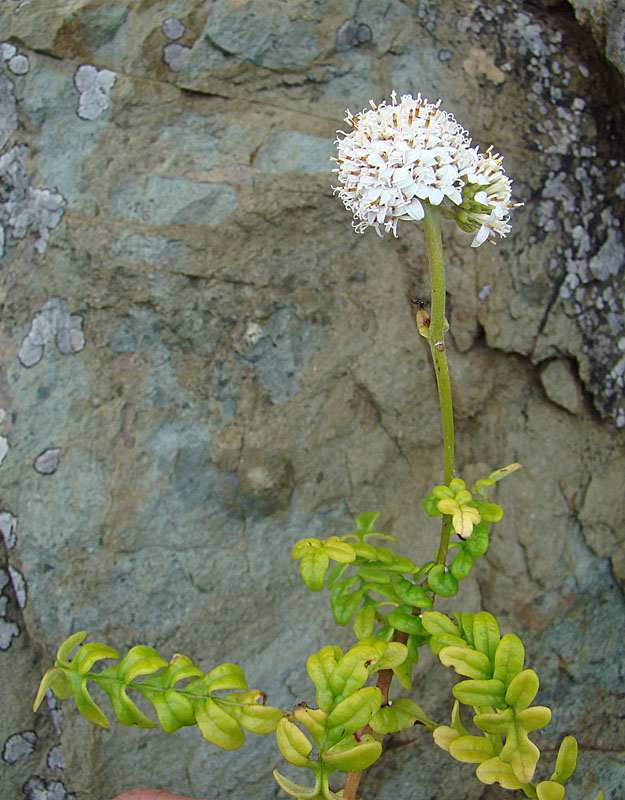
- Polyachyrus poeppigii

Scientific classification
- Kingdom: Plantae
- Clade: Tracheophytes
- Clade: Angiosperms
- Clade: Eudicots
- Clade: Asterids
- Order: Asterales
- Family: Asteraceae
- Subfamily: Mutisioideae
- Tribe: Nassauvieae
- Genus: Polyachyrus; Lag.

Type species
- Polyachyrus poeppigii Kunze ex Less.

Synonyms
- Diaphoranthus Meyen; Bridgesia Hook.; Cephaloseris Poepp. ex Rchb.

= Polyachyrus =

Species of plant

Polyachyrus is a genus of South American plants in the family Asteraceae.

Species accepted by the Plants of the World Online as of December 2022:

- Polyachyrus annuus I.M.Johnst. - Chile, Peru
- Polyachyrus carduoides Phil. - Chile
- Polyachyrus cinereus Ricardi & Weldt - Chile
- Polyachyrus fuscus (Meyen) Walp. - Chile, Peru
- Polyachyrus gayi J.Rémy - Chile
- Polyachyrus poeppigii Kunze ex Less. - Chile, Peru
- Polyachyrus sphaerocephalus D.Don - Chile, Peru
