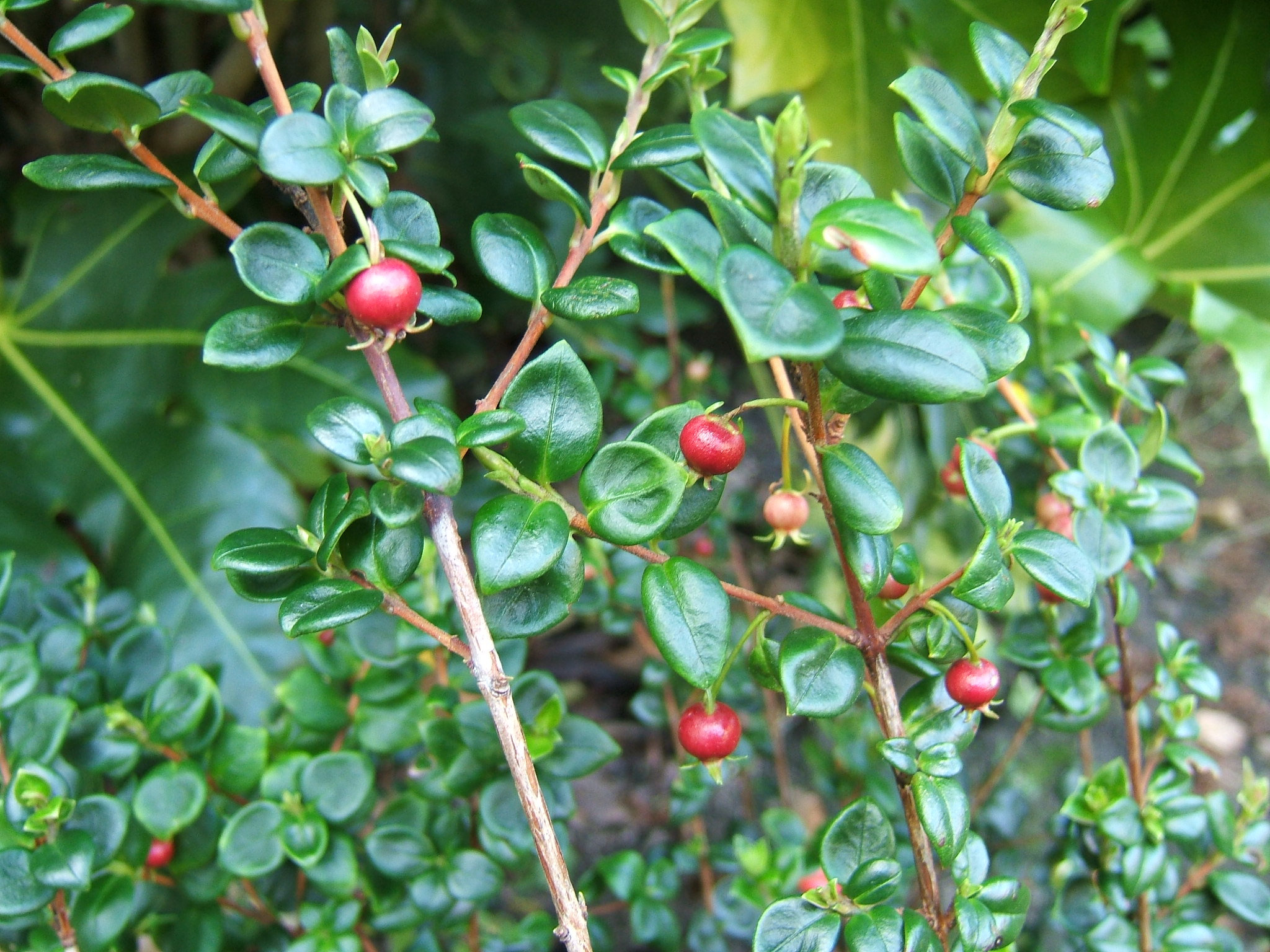
- Ugni molinae

Scientific classification
- Kingdom: Plantae
- Clade: Tracheophytes
- Clade: Angiosperms
- Clade: Eudicots
- Clade: Rosids
- Order: Myrtales
- Family: Myrtaceae
- Subfamily: Myrtoideae
- Tribe: Myrteae
- Genus: Ugni; Turcz.

Type species
- Ugni molinae Turcz.

= Ugni =

Genus of flowering plants in the myrtle family

Ugni is a genus of plants in the myrtle family Myrtaceae, described as a genus in 1848. It is native to western Latin America from the Valdivian temperate rain forests of southern Chile (including the Juan Fernández Islands) and adjacent regions of southern Argentina, north to southern Mexico.

They are shrubs with evergreen foliage, reaching 1–5 m (3.3–16.4 ft) tall. The leaves are opposite, oval, 1–4 cm (0.4–1.6 in) long and 0.2–2.5 cm (0.08–1 in) broad, entire, glossy dark green, with a spicy scent if crushed. The flowers are drooping, 1–2 cm (0.4–0.8 in) diameter with four or five white or pale pink petals and numerous short stamens; the fruit is a small red or purple berry 1 cm diameter.

== Species ==
Image	Scientific name	Distribution
	Ugni candollei (Barnéoud) O.Berg	Central to southern Chile
	Ugni molinae Turcz.	Central to southern Chile, southern Argentina; naturalized in New Zealand and Juan Fernández Islands
	Ugni myricoides (Kunth) O.Berg	Mexico (Hidalgo, Veracruz, Puebla, Oaxaca, Chiapas), Central America, South America (Guyana, Venezuela, Guyana, Colombia, Ecuador, Peru, NW Brazil (Amazonas + Roraima)).
	Ugni selkirkii (Hook. & Arn.) O.Berg	Robinson Crusoe Island

== Etymology ==
The scientific name derives from the Mapuche Native American name Uñi for U. molinae. The genus was formerly often included in either Myrtus or Eugenia; it is distinguished from these by the drooping flowers with stamens shorter than the petals.

== Uses ==
Ugni molinae (syn. Myrtus ugni, Eugenia ugni) is grown as an ornamental plant for its edible berries. Some commercial "strawberry flavouring" is made from this species, not from strawberries. Myrtus ugni fruits are oblate and up to 1.5 cm (0.6 in) in diameter with a purplish to deep cranberry color. They are used to make piquant drinks, desserts, jams, and jellies.
