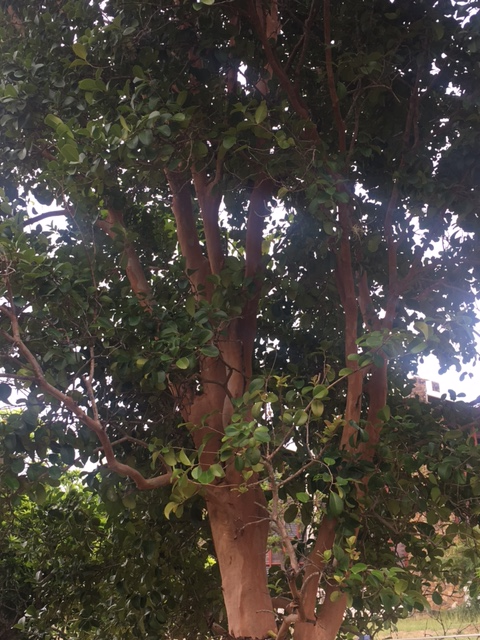

Conservation status
- Least Concern (IUCN 3.1)

Scientific classification
- Kingdom: Plantae
- Clade: Tracheophytes
- Clade: Angiosperms
- Clade: Eudicots
- Clade: Rosids
- Order: Myrtales
- Family: Myrtaceae
- Genus: Myrcianthes
- Species: M. fragrans

Binomial name
- Myrcianthes fragrans (Sw.) McVaugh

= Myrcianthes fragrans =

Species of tree

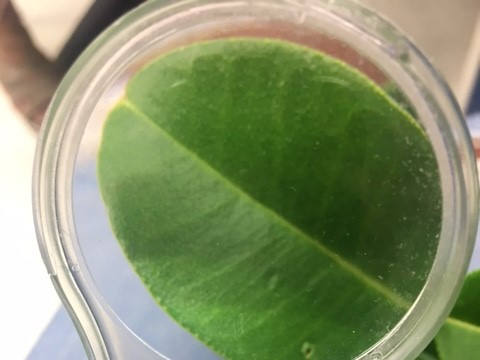
Myrcianthes fragrans leaf. Picture taken on the campus of the University of the Virgin Islands, St.Thomas

Myrcianthes fragrans, commonly known as twinberry or Simpson's stopper, is a tree in the family of Myrtaceae, native to Florida, the United States Virgin Islands, other countries within the Caribbean, Central America and northern South America. It is a common tree in moist tropical forests of the region.

== Description ==
Myrcianthes fragrans can grow up to 6 m (20 ft) in hight, the plant may grow as a shrub or small tree. It blooms white small flowers and green berries. The leaves are of a dark green color and give off a subtle nutmeg scent. The leaves are generally three inches (76 mm) in length and have an elliptical shape.

== Usage ==
Used medically to treat gastrointestinal problems.
