= Myrcianthes oreophila =

Conservation status
- Least Concern (IUCN 3.1)

Scientific classification
- Kingdom: Plantae
- Clade: Tracheophytes
- Clade: Angiosperms
- Clade: Eudicots
- Clade: Rosids
- Order: Myrtales
- Family: Myrtaceae
- Genus: Myrcianthes
- Species: M. oreophila

Binomial name
- Myrcianthes oreophila (Diels) McVaugh

Synonyms
- Eugenia oreophila Diels

Species of tree

Myrcianthes oreophila is a species of tree in the family Myrtaceae. It is native to southern Peru and Bolivia.

== Description ==
Tree 5–15 meters high, with a beige or reddish flaky bark. Vegetative buds and young branchlets are covered in white tiny hairs. Petioles are short and stout, 2.5–4 mm. long, 1-1.5 mm. thick. Leaves are ovate to orbicular or reniform, rigid, 1–4.5 cm long, 1–3 cm wide. Inflorescence is a three-flowered dichasium, or just a single flower; calyx-lobes deltoid, blunt-tipped, 3.5–4 mm. wide at base, about 3.5 mm. long, externally covered by tiny coarse hairs; petals 4, obovate, about 7 mm. long; stamens about 150, up to 8 mm. long; style glabrous, 7–8 mm. long.

== Distribution and habitat ==
Myrcianthes oreophila grows in humid or subhumid Andean montane forests of southern Peru, between 2500 and 4000 meters above sea level. It has been reported from the Peruvian regions of Apurimac and Cusco, although there is a report from Bolivia. It's an indicator species of mature vegetation.
