= Syzygium oreophilum =

Conservation status
- Least Concern (IUCN 2.3)

Scientific classification
- Kingdom: Plantae
- Clade: Tracheophytes
- Clade: Angiosperms
- Clade: Eudicots
- Clade: Rosids
- Order: Myrtales
- Family: Myrtaceae
- Genus: Syzygium
- Species: S. oreophilum

Binomial name
- Syzygium oreophilum I.M.Turner

Synonyms
- Eugenia jugalis Ridl.; Eugenia oreophila Ridl., nom. illeg. homonym. post.

Species of flowering plant

Syzygium oreophilum is a species of flowering plant in the family Myrtaceae. It is a shrub endemic to Peninsular Malaysia.
