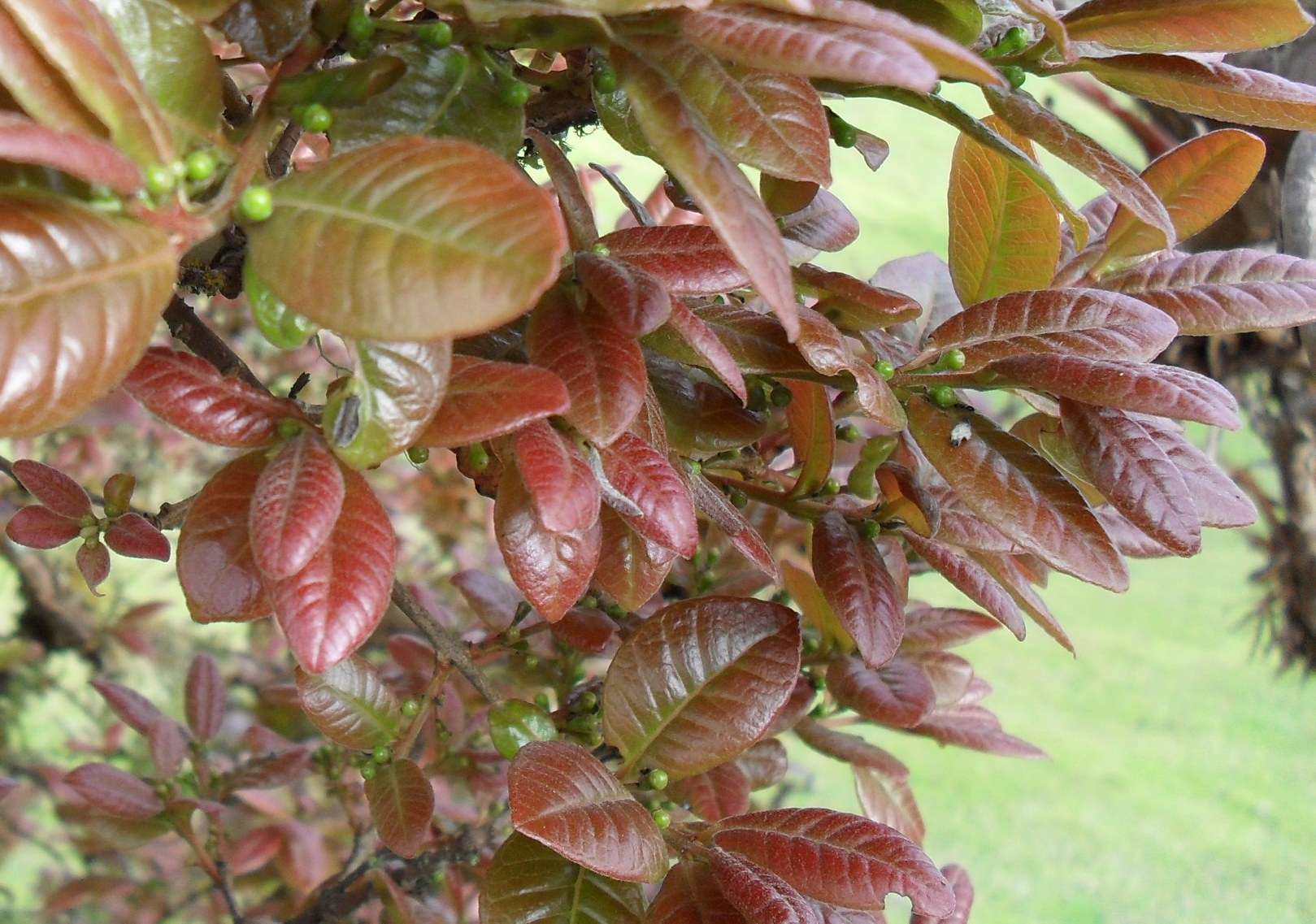
- Myrcianthes leucoxyla

Scientific classification
- Kingdom: Plantae
- Clade: Embryophytes
- Clade: Tracheophytes
- Clade: Spermatophytes
- Clade: Angiosperms
- Clade: Eudicots
- Clade: Rosids
- Order: Myrtales
- Family: Myrtaceae
- Subfamily: Myrtoideae
- Tribe: Myrteae
- Genus: Myrcianthes; O.Berg

Synonyms
- Acreugenia Kausel; Anamomis Griseb.; Aspidogenia Burret; Reichea Kausel; Reicheia Kausel; Pseudomyrcianthes Kausel

= Myrcianthes =

Genus of flowering plants in the myrtle family

Myrcianthes is a genus of flowering plants in the myrtle family, Myrtaceae, described as a genus in 1856. They are native to Central and South America, the West Indies, and southern Florida.

== Taxonomy ==
Accepted species:

Image	Scientific name	Common name	Distribution
	Myrcianthes borealis McVaugh		Colombia, Venezuela
	Myrcianthes bradeana Mattos & D.Legrand		Minas Gerais
	Myrcianthes callicoma McVaugh		Tucumán, Bolivia
	Myrcianthes cavalcantei Mattos		Roraima
	Myrcianthes cisplatensis (Cambess.) O.Berg		S Brazil, Paraguay, Uruguay, N Argentina
	Myrcianthes coquimbensis (Barnéoud) Landrum & Grifo	lucumillo	Coquimbo
	Myrcianthes crebrifolia (Steyerm.) McVaugh		Colombia, Venezuela
	Myrcianthes cymosa (O.Berg) Mattos		SE Brazil
	Myrcianthes discolor (Kunth) McVaugh		Bolivia, Peru, Ecuador
	Myrcianthes esnardiana (Urb. & Ekman) Alain		Massif de la Hotte
	Myrcianthes ferreyrae (McVaugh) McVaugh		Peru
	Myrcianthes fimbriata (Kunth) McVaugh		Peru, Ecuador
	Myrcianthes fragrans (Sw.) McVaugh	twinberry, twinberry stopper	from Mexico + Florida to Peru
	Myrcianthes gigantea (D.Legrand) D.Legrand		S Brazil, Uruguay, Misiones
	Myrcianthes hallii (O.Berg) McVaugh	Arrayán de Quito	Colombia, Venezuela, Ecuador
	Myrcianthes indifferens (McVaugh) McVaugh		Peru
	Myrcianthes karsteniana (Klotzsch ex O.Berg) McVaugh		Colombia, Venezuela
	Myrcianthes lanosa McVaugh		Cajamarca (Peru)
	Myrcianthes leucoxyla (Ortega) McVaugh	Arrayán blanco	Colombia, Venezuela
	Myrcianthes lindleyana (Kunth) McVaugh		Colombia, Venezuela, Ecuador, Peru
	Myrcianthes mato (Griseb.) McVaugh		Bolivia, NW Argentina
	Myrcianthes minimifolia (McVaugh) McVaugh		Peru, Jujuy (Argentina)
	Myrcianthes monteucalyptoides Proença & L.V.S.Jenn.		Peru
	Myrcianthes myrsinoides (Kunth) Grifo		Colombia, Venezuela, Ecuador, Peru, Bolivia
	Myrcianthes oreophila (Diels) McVaugh		Peru, Bolivia
	Myrcianthes orthostemon (O.Berg) Grifo		Colombia, Venezuela, Ecuador, Peru
	Myrcianthes osteomeloides (Rusby) McVaugh		Peru, Bolivia
	Myrcianthes pearcei (McVaugh) McVaugh		La Paz (Bolivia)
	Myrcianthes pedersenii D.Legrand		Paraguay
	Myrcianthes prodigiosa McVaugh		Venezuela, Ecuador, Guyana, Suriname
	Myrcianthes pseudomato (D.Legrand) McVaugh		Bolivia, NW Argentina
	Myrcianthes pungens (O.Berg) D.Legrand	Guabiyu	Bolivia, Brazil, Paraguay, Uruguay, N Argentina
	Myrcianthes quinqueloba (McVaugh) McVaugh		Peru
	Myrcianthes rhopaloides (Kunth) McVaugh		Colombia, Venezuela, Ecuador, Peru, Bolivia
	Myrcianthes riparia Sobral, Grippa & T.B.Guim.		S Brazil
	Myrcianthes sessilis McVaugh		Colombia, Venezuela
	Myrcianthes storkii (Standl.) McVaugh		Panama, Costa Rica
