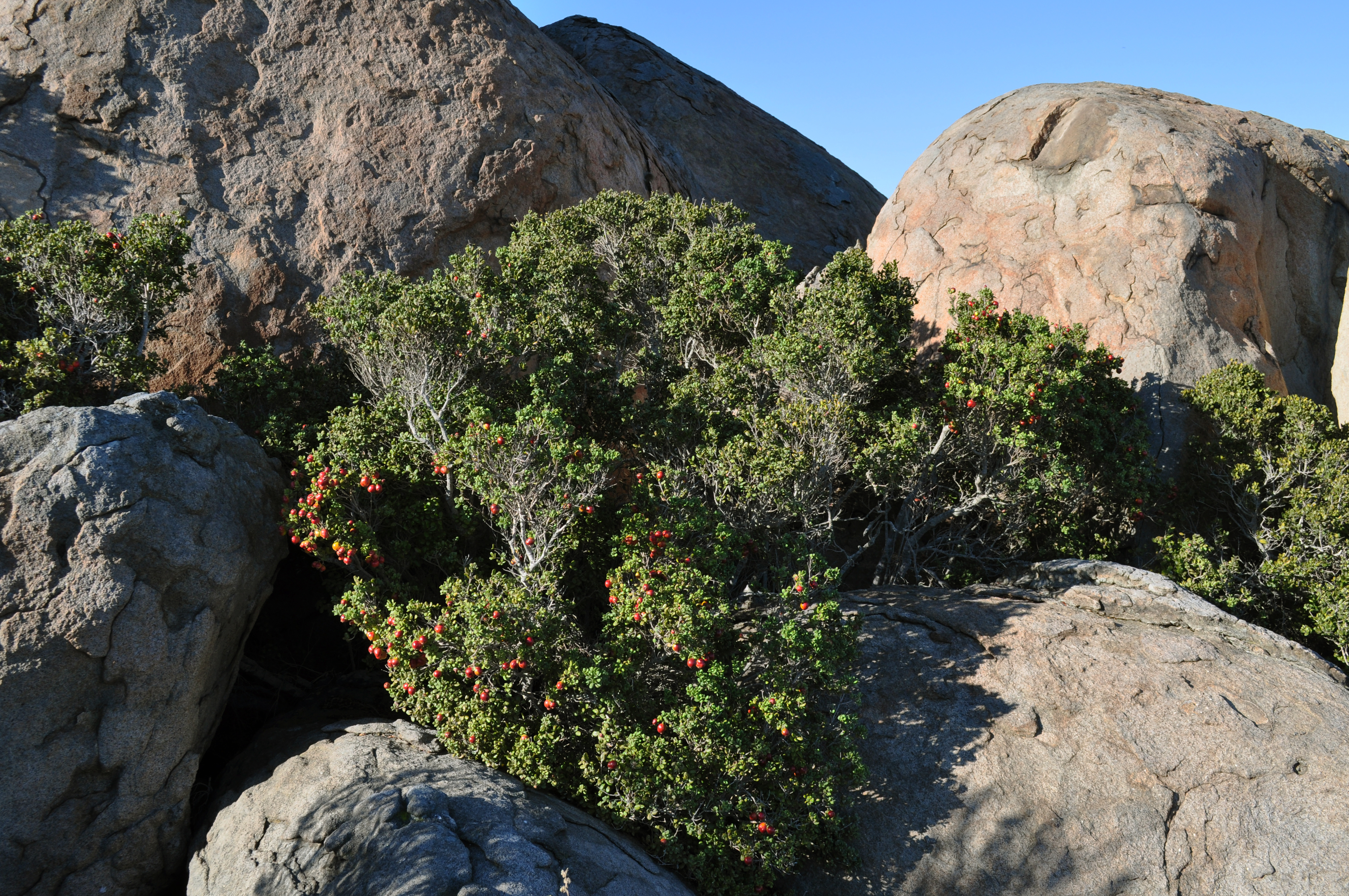

Conservation status
- Least Concern (IUCN 3.1)

Scientific classification
- Kingdom: Plantae
- Clade: Tracheophytes
- Clade: Angiosperms
- Clade: Eudicots
- Clade: Rosids
- Order: Myrtales
- Family: Myrtaceae
- Genus: Myrcianthes
- Species: M. coquimbensis

Binomial name
- Myrcianthes coquimbensis (Barnéoud) Landrum & Grifo

Synonyms
- Aspidogenia coquimbensis (Barnéoud) Burret; Myrtus coquimbensis Barnéoud; Myrtus coquimbensis var. rotundifolia O.Berg; Reichea coquimbensis (Barnéoud) Kausel

= Myrcianthes coquimbensis =

Species of plant

Myrcianthes coquimbensis, commonly called lucumillo, is an evergreen shrub of the genus Myrcianthes of the family Myrtaceae. It is endemic to coastal Coquimbo Region in north-central Chile. It produces edible fruit.

== Description ==
Myrcianthes coquimbensis is a small rounded, aromatic, dense shrub growing to a height of about 1.5 metres (5 feet). The leaves are short-stalked, evergreen, oval or elliptical, with entire margins that are often downrolled. They are leathery with bluntly rounded tips, and are 1.5 to 2.5 cm (0.6 to 1.0 in) long and 1.2 to 1.8 cm (0.5 to 0.7 in) wide. The lateral veins are nearly perpendicular to the central vein. The small flowers either grow singly or in groups of three, the central one being sessile and the side ones having short stalks. The five petals are white and there is a boss of protruding stamens. The fruit is a edible fleshy berry containing one or two seeds and is topped by the remains of the five persistent sepals. The fruit has a diameter of 1.5 to 2 cm (0.6 to 0.8 in) and turns red when ripe.

== Distribution and habitat ==
Myrcianthes coquimbensis is endemic to Chile. Its range extends for about 83 kilometres (52 mi) along the coast of the Elqui Province in the Chilean region of Coquimbo. It typically grows on coastal rocks located on slopes that are almost constantly moist with mists blown in from the Pacific Ocean, although some plants grow in other locations. This species is often associated with a community of other plants and shrubs including Bridgesia incisifolia, Oxalis gigantea, Heliotropium stenophyllum, Bahia ambrosioides and Polyachyrus poeppigii. The conservation status of this shrub is considered to be "endangered" because of habitat loss, failure of the shrub to flower and fruit, and consequent lack of recruitment of young plants. The IUCN Red List assesses the species as Least Concern.

== See also ==
- Myrceugenia obtusa
- Pouteria valparadisaea
- Eugenia calycina
