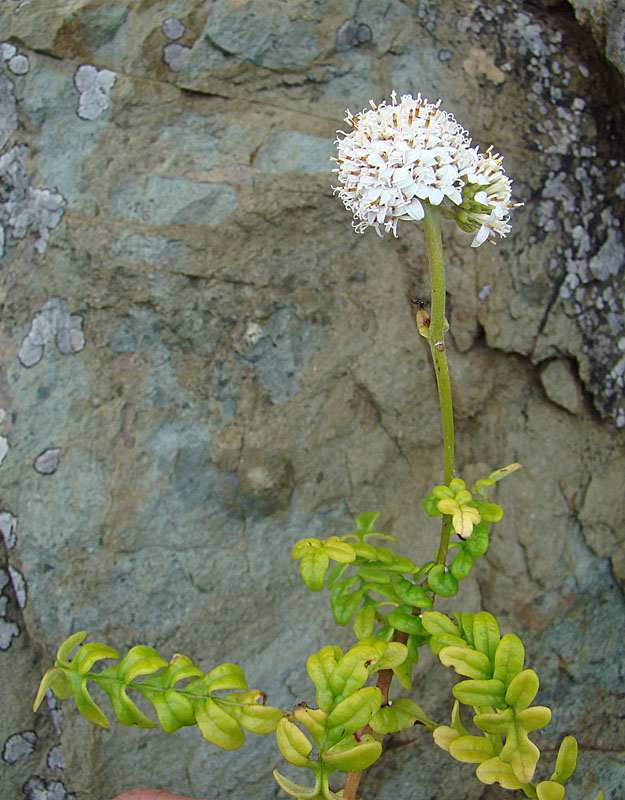

Scientific classification
- Kingdom: Plantae
- Clade: Tracheophytes
- Clade: Angiosperms
- Clade: Eudicots
- Clade: Asterids
- Order: Asterales
- Family: Asteraceae
- Genus: Polyachyrus
- Species: P. poeppigii

Binomial name
- Polyachyrus poeppigii Kunze ex Less.

= Polyachyrus poeppigii =

Species of plant

Polyachyrus poeppigii is a species in the family Asteraceae that has segmented leaves.

== Bibliography ==
- Eggli, Urs; Newton, Leonard E. (2004). Etymological Dictionary of Succulent Plant Names. Springer Science+Business Media. ISBN 9783540004899.
