= Bull Point =

Most southerly part of East Falkland, and of the two main islands of the Falklands

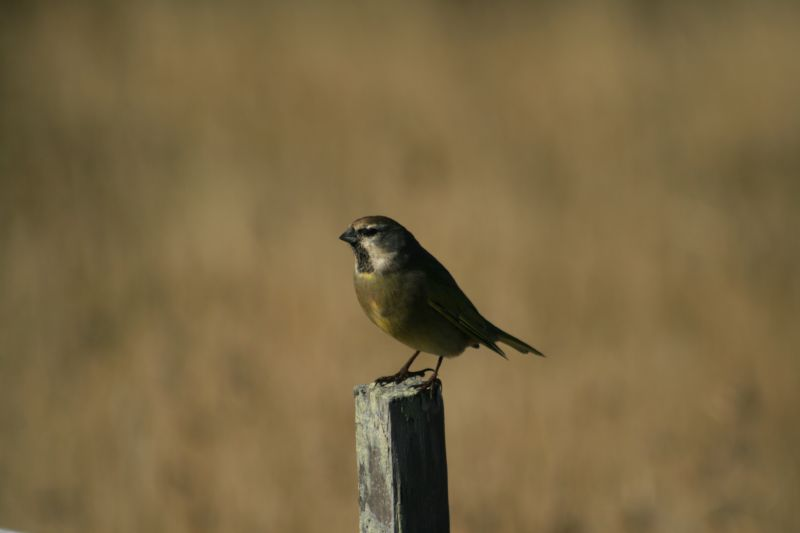
- Bull Point is an important site for white-bridled finches

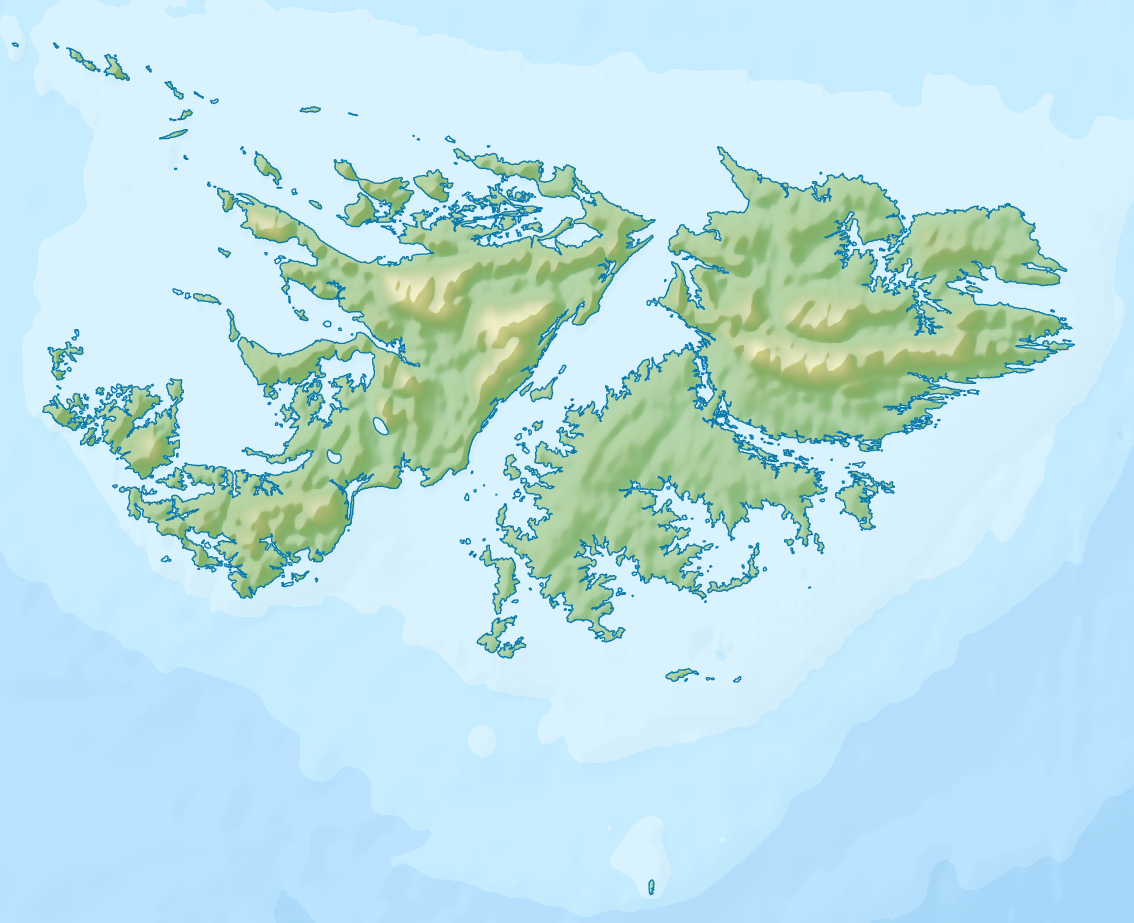
- Location within Falkland Islands
- Location: East Falkland, Falklands
- Coordinates: 52.3325°S 59.2989°W
- Area: 1,500 ha (5.8 sq mi)
- Designation: Important Bird Area
- Designated: by BirdLife International

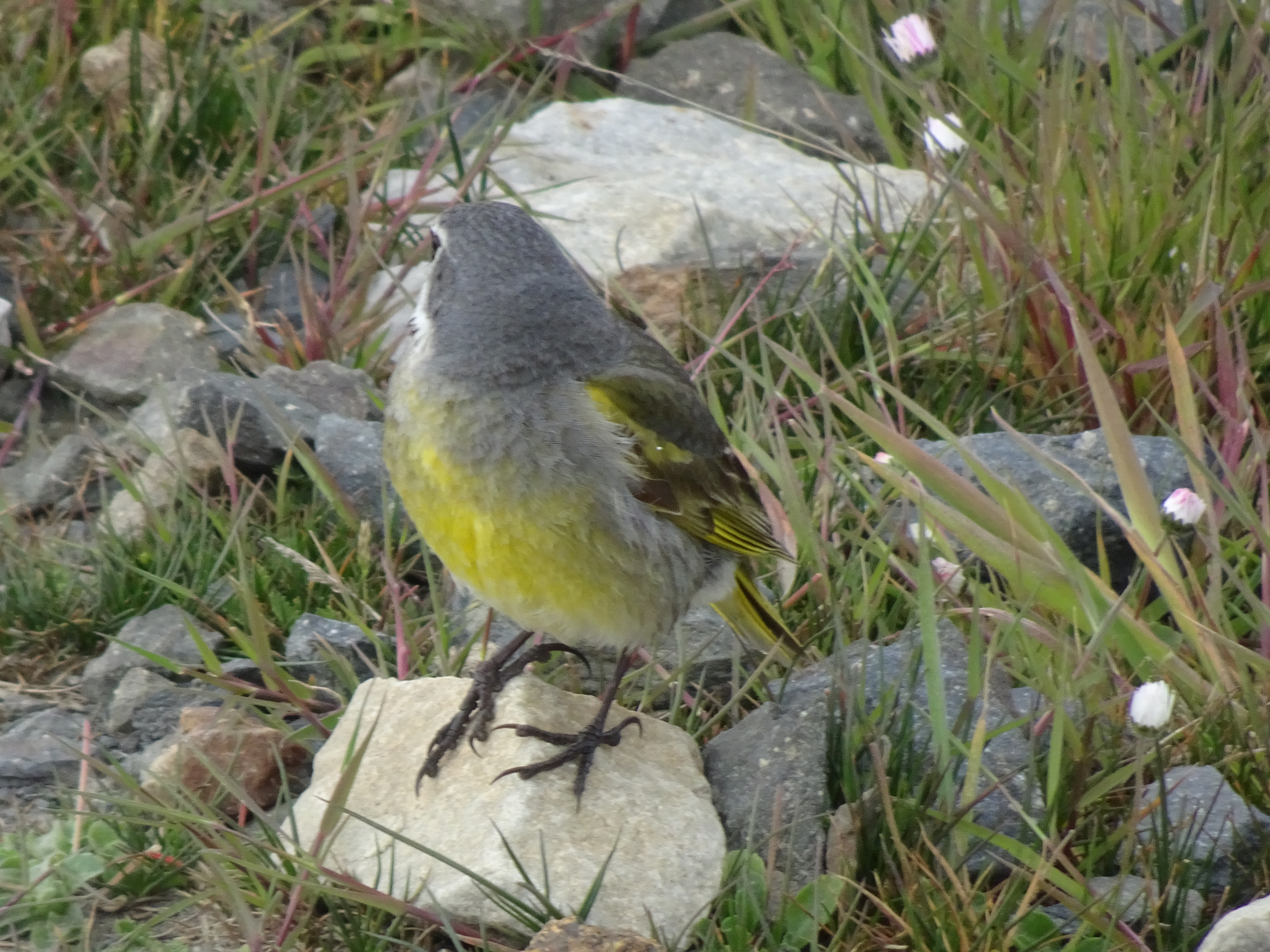
White-bridled finch (Melanodera melanodera) near Bull Point.

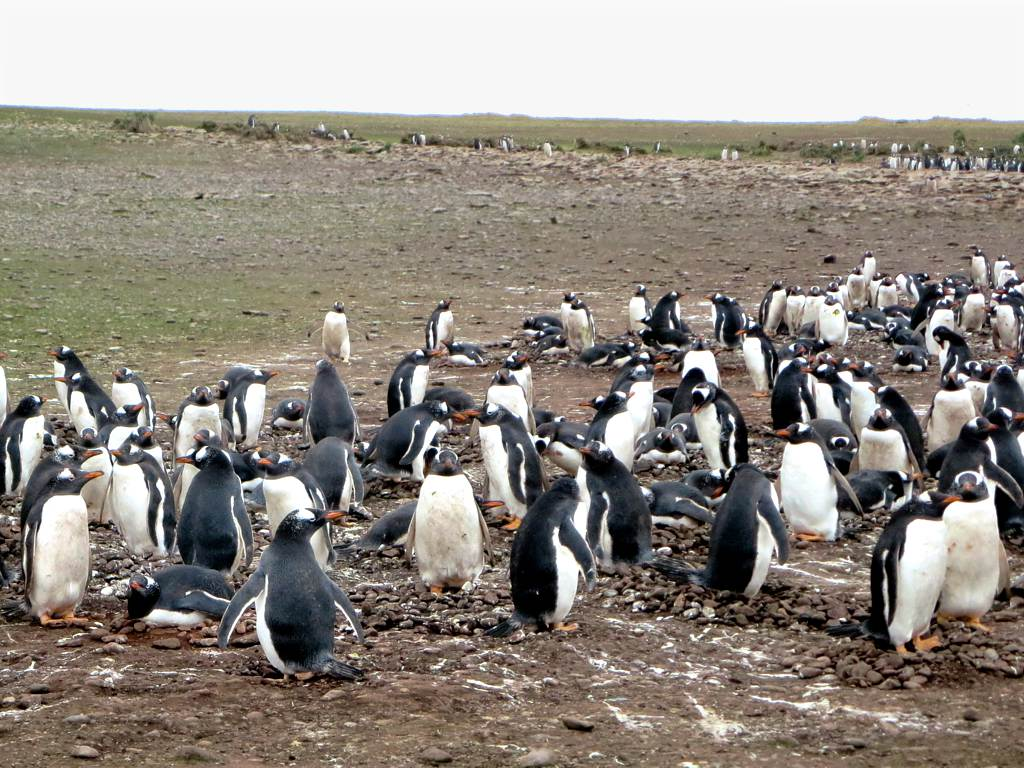
Gentoo penguin (Pygoscelis papua) colony in the Falkland Islands

Bull Point is the most southerly part of East Falkland, and of the two main islands of the Falklands. It is at the far end of Lafonia, near Eagle Passage, and forms part of the west shore of the Bay of Harbours. A 1500 ha tract has been identified by BirdLife International as an Important Bird Area (IBA).

== Description ==
The area is part of a farm and subject to grazing, though the tip of the point has been fenced off for conservation. The land is generally low-lying with a varied habitat of maritime heath in the higher areas and rocky and sandy beaches on the coast. Dune systems cover much of the southern point. Coastal greens interspersed with permanent and seasonal ponds provide habitat for waders and waterfowl.

=== Flora and fauna ===
Among the 101 species of plants recorded, interesting species are the vulnerable native fern Dusen's moonwort, only known to occur in two other localities in the Falklands, southern dock, and the endemic clubmoss cudweed, lady's slipper, coastal nassauvia and vanilla daisy. There is a small southern sea lion breeding colony and a major haul-out site for southern elephant seals. Birds for which the site is of conservation significance include Falkland steamer ducks, ruddy-headed geese (65 breeding pairs), gentoo penguins (4800 pairs), Magellanic penguins and white-bridled finches.
