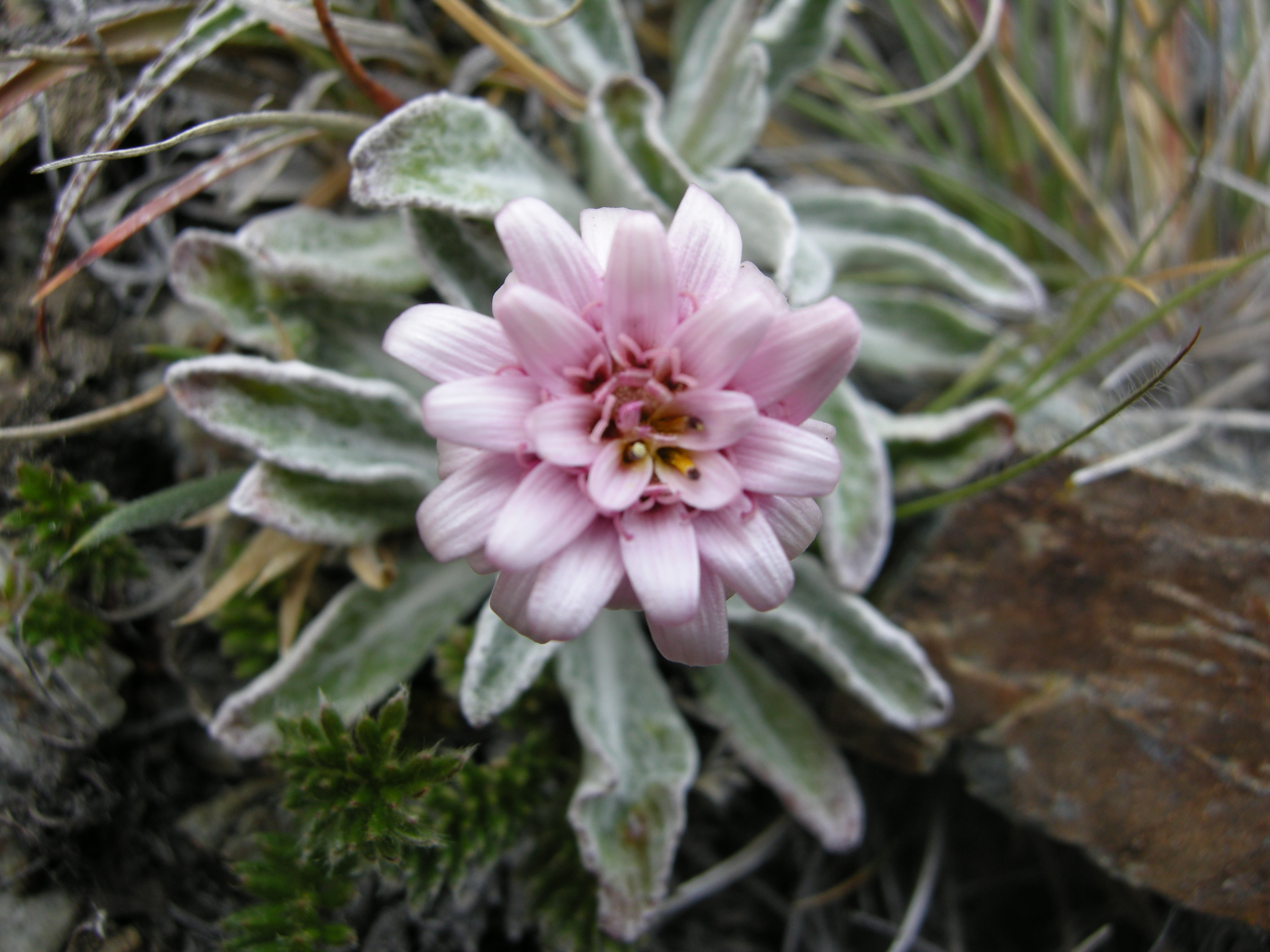
- Leucheria hahnii

Scientific classification
- Kingdom: Plantae
- Clade: Tracheophytes
- Clade: Angiosperms
- Clade: Eudicots
- Clade: Asterids
- Order: Asterales
- Family: Asteraceae
- Subfamily: Mutisioideae
- Tribe: Nassauvieae
- Genus: Leucheria; Lag.

Type species
- Leucheria hieracioides Cass.

Synonyms
- Clybatis Phil.; Lasiorrhiza Lag.; Eizaguirrea Remy; Leuceria Lag.; Mimela Phil.; Chabraea DC.; Ptilurus D.Don; Bertolonia DC.

= Leucheria =

Genus of flowering plants

Leucheria is a genus of flowering plants in the family Asteraceae.

Leucheria is native to South America and the Falkland Islands.

Species

- Leucheria achillaeifolia Hook. & Arn.
- Leucheria amoena Phil.
- Leucheria apiifolia Phil.
- Leucheria barrasiana (J.Rémy) F.Meigen
- Leucheria bridgesii Hook. & Arn.
- Leucheria candidissima Gillies & D.Don
- Leucheria cantillanensis Lavandero
- Leucheria cerberoana J.Rémy
- Leucheria coerulescens J.Rémy
- Leucheria congesta Gillies ex D.Don
- Leucheria cumingii Hook. & Arn.
- Leucheria daucifolia (D.Don) Crisci
- Leucheria diemii Cabrera
- Leucheria eriocephala Speg.
- Leucheria floribunda DC.
- Leucheria garciana J.Rémy
- Leucheria gayana (J.Rémy) Reiche
- Leucheria gilliesii Hook. & Arn.
- Leucheria glabriuscula (Phil.) Reiche
- Leucheria glacialis (Poepp. ex Less.) Reiche
- Leucheria glandulosa D.Don
- Leucheria hahnii Franch.
- Leucheria hieracioides Cass.
- Leucheria landbeckii (Phil.) Reiche
- Leucheria leontopodioides (Kuntze) K.Schum.
- Leucheria lithospermifolia (Less.) Reiche
- Leucheria magna Phil.
- Leucheria menana J.Rémy
- Leucheria millefolium Dusén & Skottsb.
- Leucheria multiflora Phil.
- Leucheria nutans (J.Rémy) Reiche
- Leucheria oligocephala J.Rémy
- Leucheria paniculata Poepp. ex Less.
- Leucheria papillosa Cabrera
- Leucheria polyclados (J.Rémy) Reiche
- Leucheria pteropogon (Griseb.) Cabrera
- Leucheria purpurea (Vahl) Hook. & Arn.
- Leucheria purpurea (Vahl) O.Hoffm. & Dusén
- Leucheria rosea Poepp. ex Less.
- Leucheria runcinata D.Don
- Leucheria salina Hieron.
- Leucheria scrobiculata D.Don
- Leucheria senecioides Hook. & Arn.
- Leucheria suaveolens (d'Urv.) Speg.
- Leucheria tenuis Less.
- Leucheria thermarum (Phil.) Phil.
- Leucheria tomentosa (Less.) Crisci
- Leucheria viscida (Bertero ex Colla) Crisci
