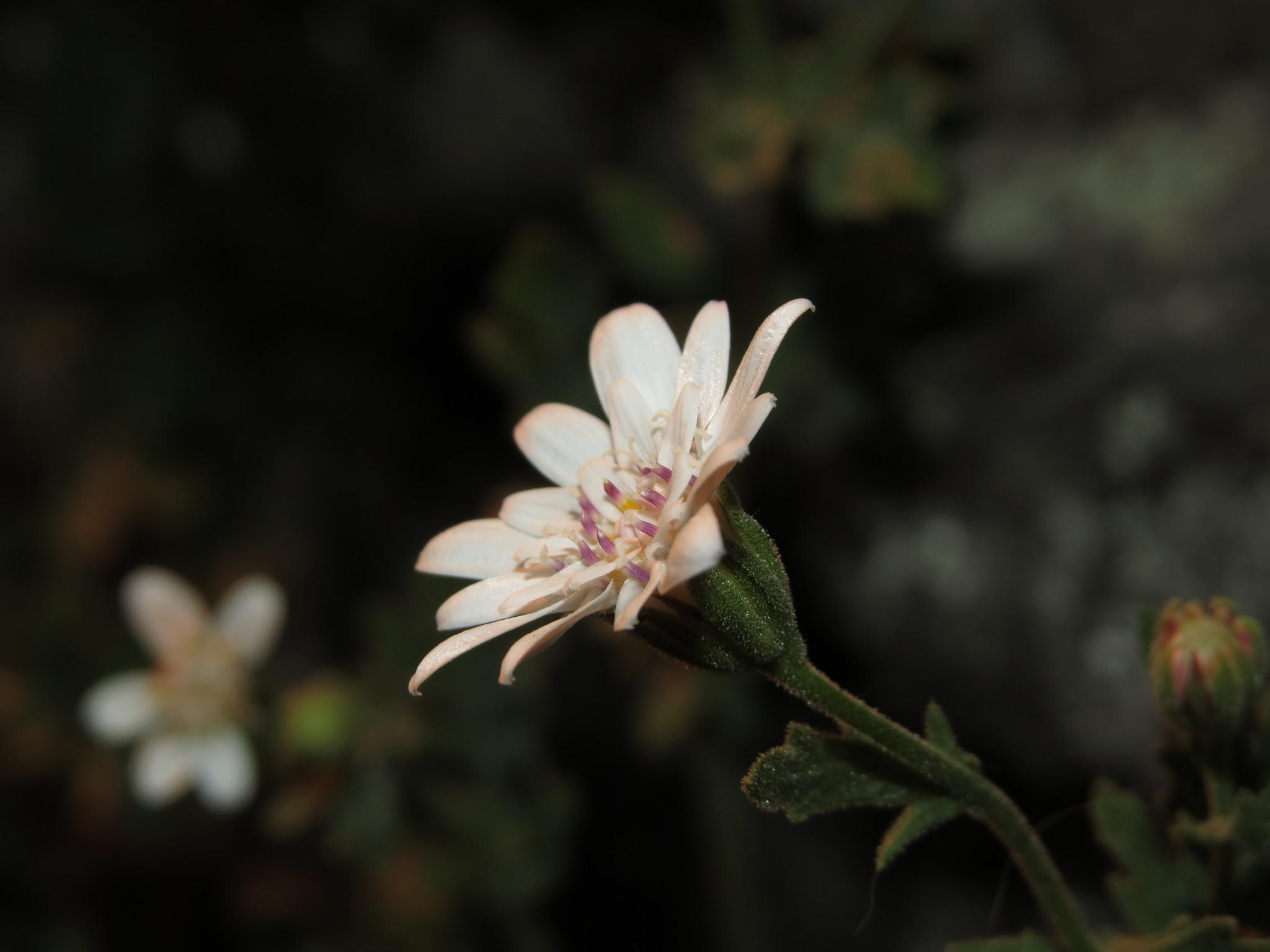

Scientific classification
- Kingdom: Plantae
- Clade: Tracheophytes
- Clade: Angiosperms
- Clade: Eudicots
- Clade: Asterids
- Order: Asterales
- Family: Asteraceae
- Genus: Leucheria
- Species: L. cantillanensis

Binomial name
- Leucheria cantillanensis Lavandero

= Leucheria cantillanensis =

Species of plant

Leucheria cantillanensis is a species of flowering plant in the family Asteraceae. It is endemic to the coastal mountain range of Central Chile. The species was first collected at the Altos de Cantillana Natural Reserve in 2019.
