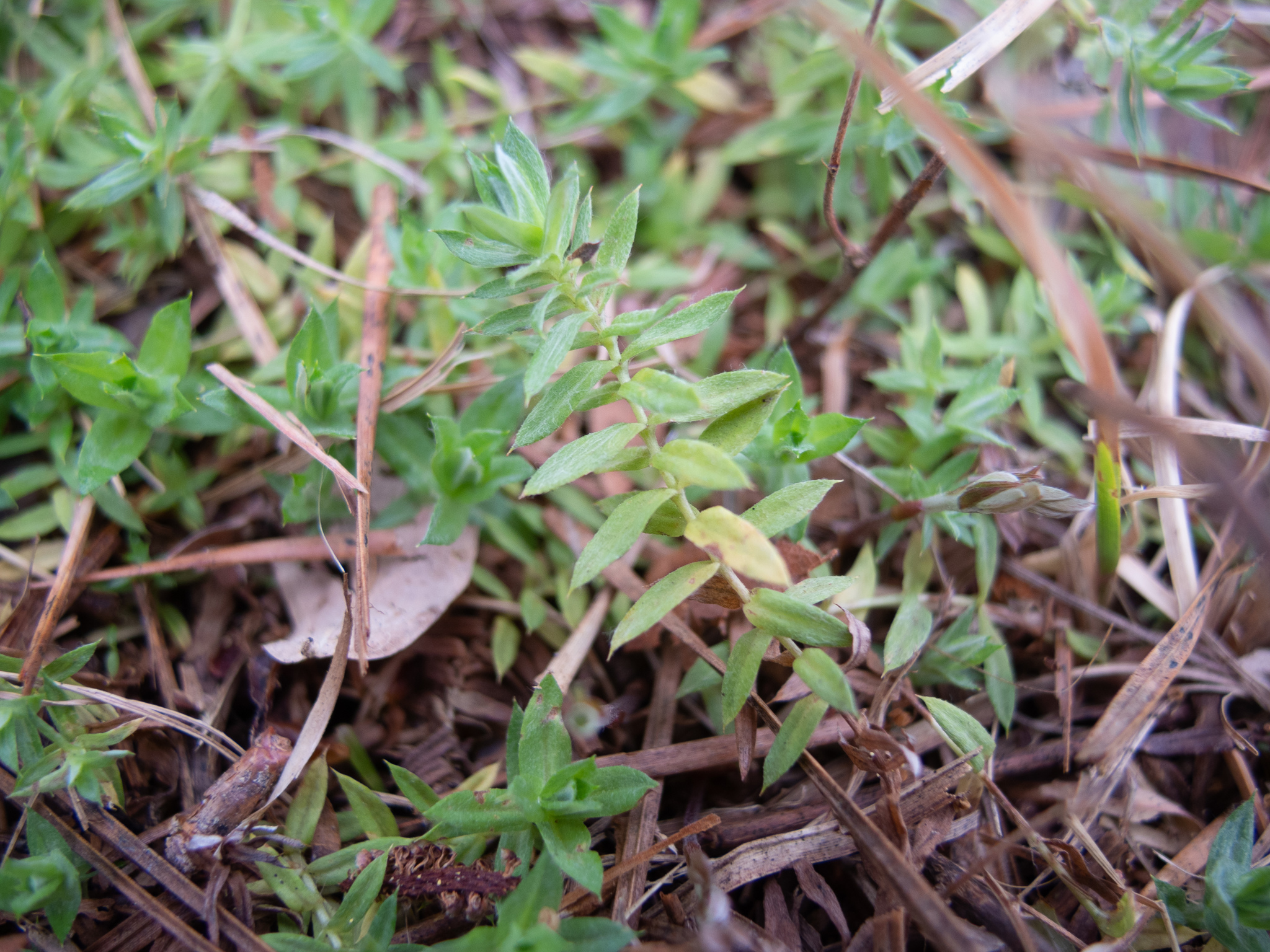

Scientific classification
- Kingdom: Plantae
- Clade: Tracheophytes
- Clade: Angiosperms
- Clade: Eudicots
- Clade: Asterids
- Order: Asterales
- Family: Asteraceae
- Genus: Chevreulia
- Species: C. acuminata

Binomial name
- Chevreulia acuminata Less.

Synonyms
- Chevreulia longipes Wedd.; Chevreulia filiformis Hook. & Arn.; Chevreulia elegans Rusby; Leucopodum campestre Gardner

= Chevreulia acuminata =

Species of flowering plant

Chevreulia acuminata, commonly known as Chevreul's sharp lawn-weed, is a plant species in the genus Chevreulia. It is found in the South American countries of Argentina, Bolivia, Brazil, Ecuador, Peru, and Venezuela.
