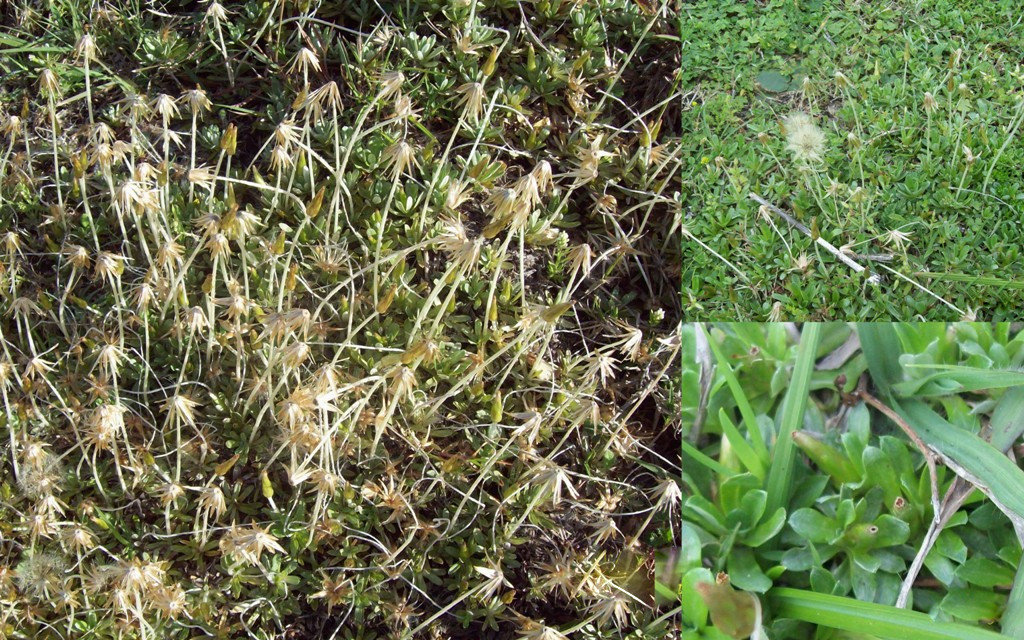
- Chevreulia sarmentosa

Scientific classification
- Kingdom: Plantae
- Clade: Embryophytes
- Clade: Tracheophytes
- Clade: Angiosperms
- Clade: Eudicots
- Clade: Asterids
- Order: Asterales
- Family: Asteraceae
- Subfamily: Asteroideae
- Tribe: Gnaphalieae
- Genus: Chevreulia; Cass.

Synonyms
- Leucopodum Gardner

= Chevreulia =

Genus of flowering plants

Chevreulia is a genus of plants in the family Asteraceae, described as a genus in 1817.

The genus is native to South America (Brazil, Bolivia, Ecuador, Argentina) and the Falkland Islands.

Species

- Chevreulia acuminata Less.
- Chevreulia diemii Cabrera
- Chevreulia gnaphalioides D.Don ex Hook. & Arn.
- Chevreulia lycopodioides (d'Urv.) DC.
- Chevreulia pusilla DC.
- Chevreulia sarmentosa (Pers.) S.F.Blake
- Chevreulia xeranthemoides D.Don ex Hook.
