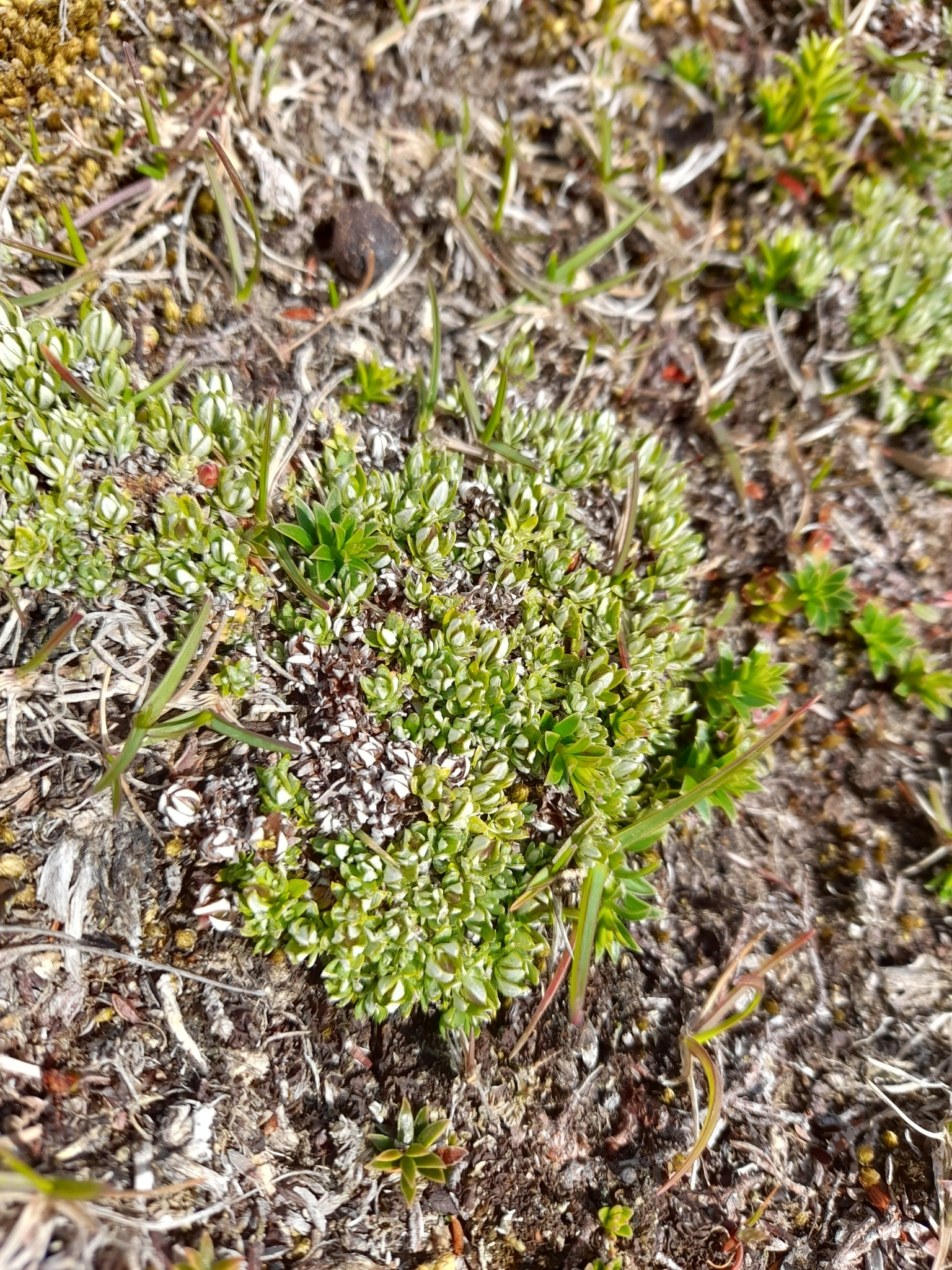

Conservation status
- Least Concern (IUCN 3.1)

Scientific classification
- Kingdom: Plantae
- Clade: Tracheophytes
- Clade: Angiosperms
- Clade: Eudicots
- Clade: Asterids
- Order: Asterales
- Family: Asteraceae
- Genus: Chevreulia
- Species: C. lycopodioides

Binomial name
- Chevreulia lycopodioides (d'Urv.) DC.

= Chevreulia lycopodioides =

Species of flowering plant

Chevreulia lycopodioides, the clubmoss cudweed, is a species of flowering plant in the family Asteraceae. It is found only in Falkland Islands. Its natural habitats are temperate shrubland and temperate grassland.
