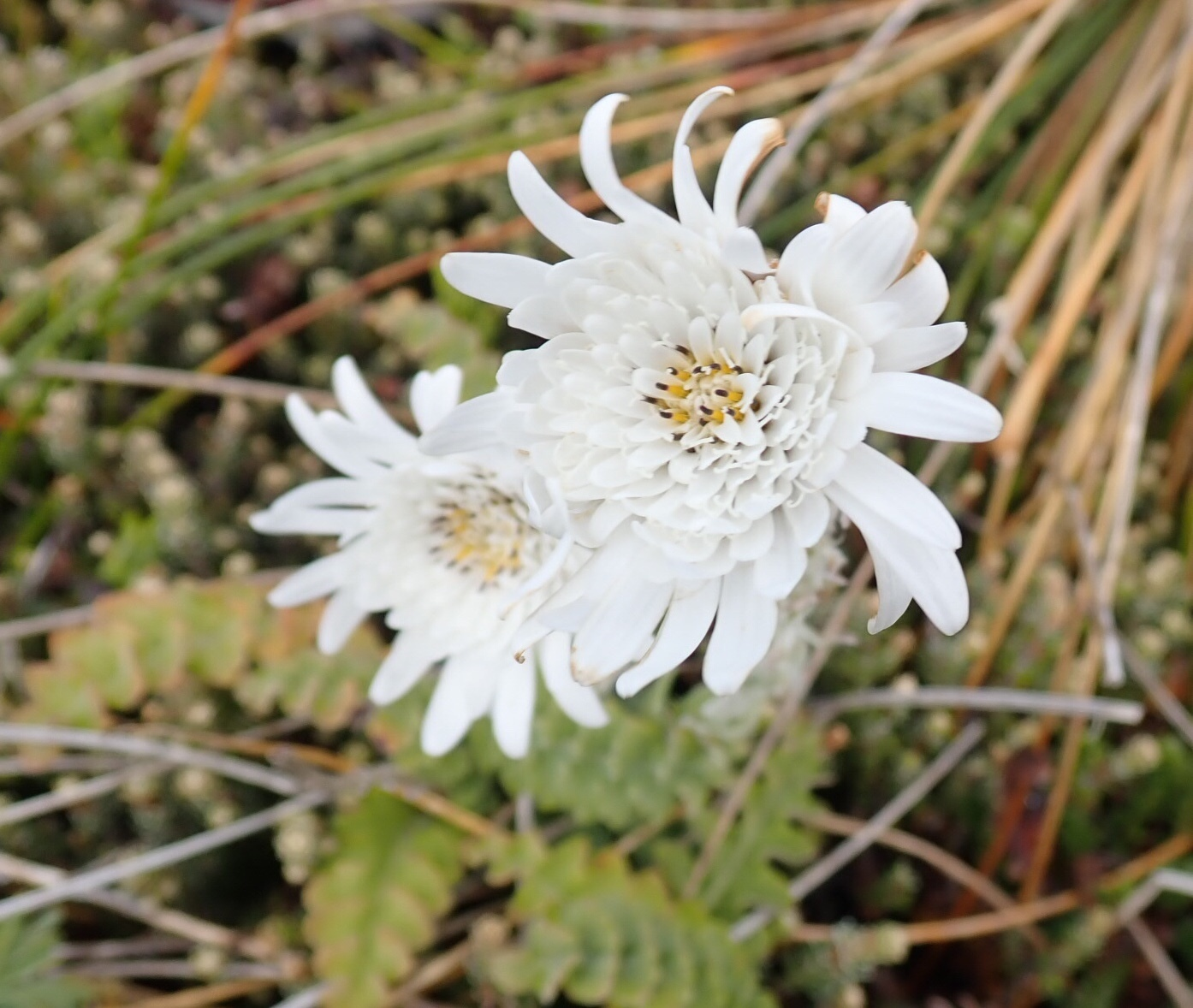

Conservation status
- Least Concern (IUCN 3.1)

Scientific classification
- Kingdom: Plantae
- Clade: Tracheophytes
- Clade: Angiosperms
- Clade: Eudicots
- Clade: Asterids
- Order: Asterales
- Family: Asteraceae
- Genus: Leucheria
- Species: L. suaveolens

Binomial name
- Leucheria suaveolens (d'Urv.) Skottsb.

= Leucheria suaveolens =

Species of flowering plant

Leucheria suaveolens, the vanilla daisy, is a species of flowering plant in the family Asteraceae. It is endemic to Falkland Islands. Its natural habitats are temperate shrubland, rocky areas, and rocky shores. It is threatened by habitat loss.
