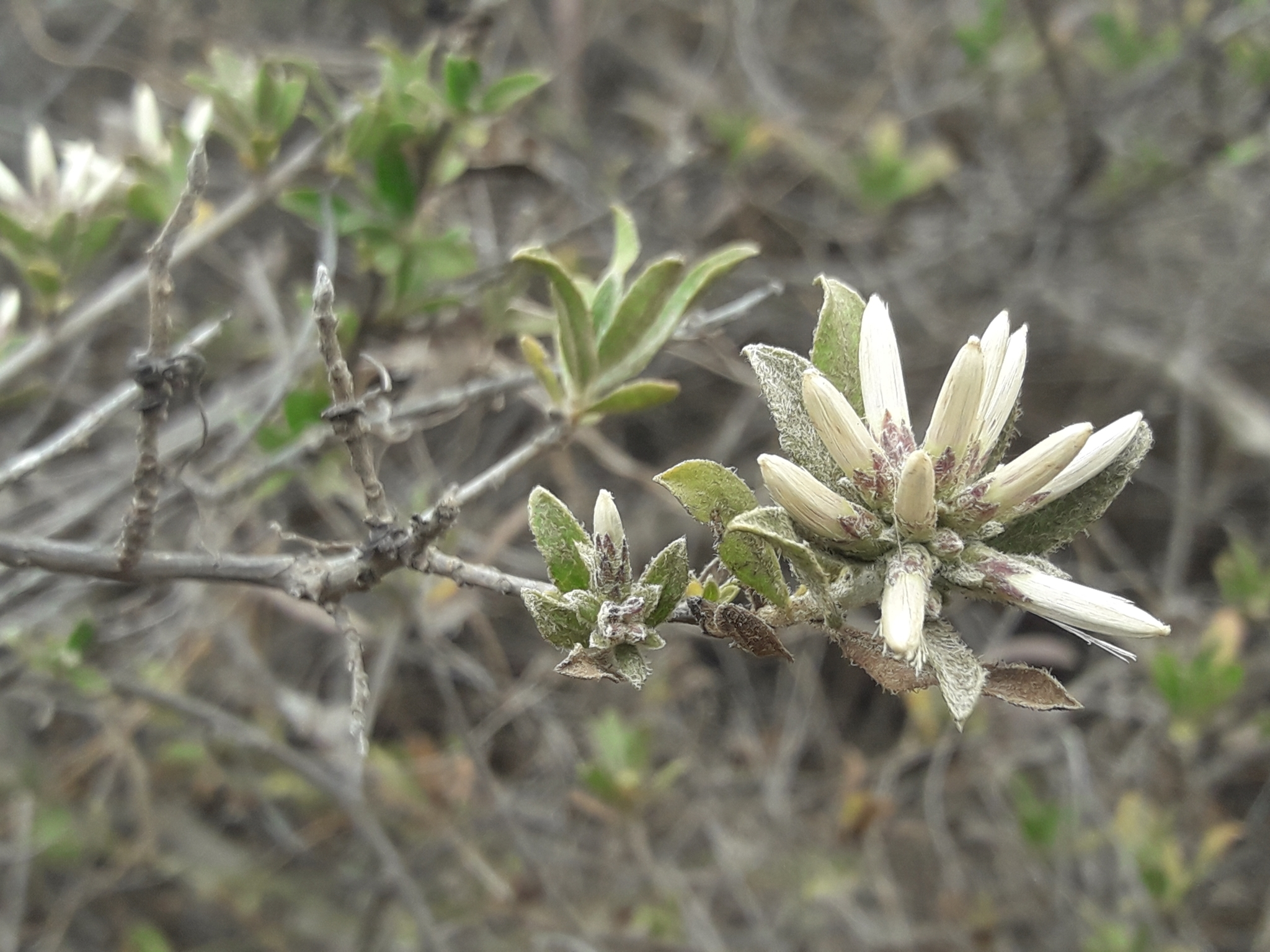
- Gochnatia foliolosa

Scientific classification
- Kingdom: Plantae
- Clade: Embryophytes
- Clade: Tracheophytes
- Clade: Spermatophytes
- Clade: Angiosperms
- Clade: Eudicots
- Clade: Asterids
- Order: Asterales
- Family: Asteraceae
- Subfamily: Gochnatioideae
- Tribe: Gochnatieae
- Genus: Gochnatia; Kunth (1818)

Type species
- Gochnatia vernonioides Kunth

Species
- 17; see text

Synonyms
- Hedraiophyllum Less. ex Steud. (1840), pro syn.; Pentaphorus D.Don (1830)

= Gochnatia =

Genus of flowering plants

Gochnatia is a genus of flowering plants in the daisy family, Asteraceae. It is named for botanist Frédéric Karl Gochnat. The genus contains mainly shrubs and subshrubs, with a few trees and herbs. All of the species are native to the American tropics. Two species native to the mountains of Southeast Asia and formerly included here are now separated as the genus Leucomeris in subfamily Wunderlichioideae.

These plants produce flower heads containing whitish or yellow disc florets each with five deep lobes. The style has short, smooth branches, and the fruit is a lightly hairy cypsela with a pappus of bristles or scales.

== Species ==
17 species are accepted.

- Gochnatia angustifolia G.Sancho, S.E.Freire & Katinas
- Gochnatia arequipensis Sandwith
- Gochnatia avicenniifolia (DC.) Cabrera
- Gochnatia boliviana S.F.Blake
- Gochnatia cardenasii S.F.Blake
- Gochnatia cratensis (Gardner) Cabrera
- Gochnatia curviflora O.Hoffm.
- Gochnatia foliolosa (D.Don) Hook. & Arn.
- Gochnatia glutinosa D.Don ex Hook. & Arn.
- Gochnatia lojaensis H.Rob. & V.A.Funk
- Gochnatia palosanto Cabrera
- Gochnatia patazina Cabrera
- Gochnatia peruviana H.Beltrán
- Gochnatia recticulifolia H.Rob. & V.A.Funk
- Gochnatia sagrana R.N.Jervis & Alain
- Gochnatia vargasii Cabrera
- Gochnatia vernonioides Kunth

=== Formerly placed here ===
- Moquiniastrum oligocephalum (Gardner) G.Sancho (as Gochnatia oligocephala (Gardner) Cabrera)
- Moquiniastrum polymorphum (as Gochnatia polymorpha)
- Nahuatlea arborescens (as Gochnatia arborescens)
- Nahuatlea hypoleuca (as Gochnatia hypoleuca)
- Tehuasca magna (M.C.Johnst.) Panero (as Gochnatia magna M.C.Johnst.)
- Vickia rotundifolia (Less.) Roque & G.Sancho (as Gochnatia rotundifolia Less.)
