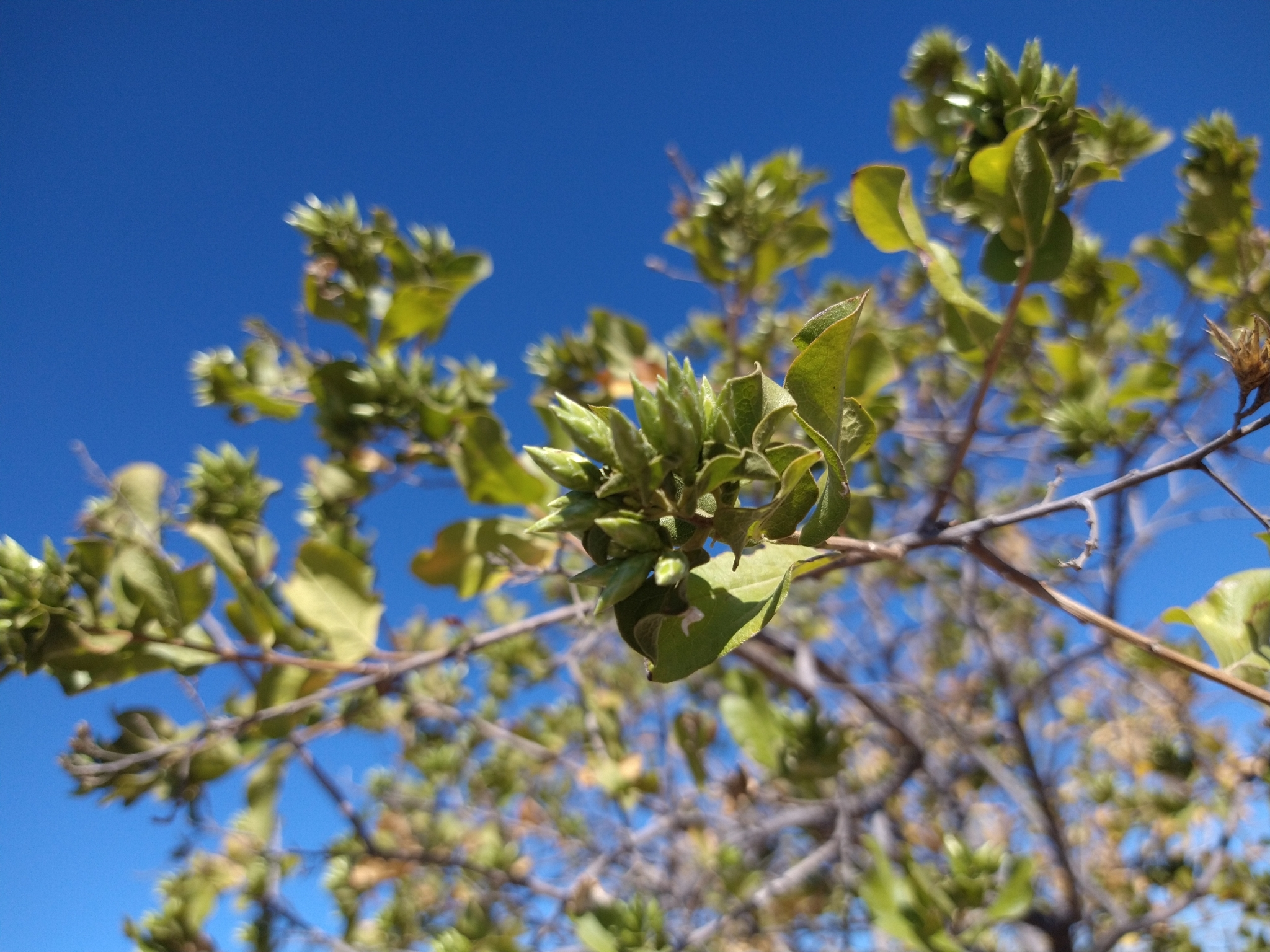
- Nahuatlea arborescens

Scientific classification
- Kingdom: Plantae
- Clade: Tracheophytes
- Clade: Angiosperms
- Clade: Eudicots
- Clade: Asterids
- Order: Asterales
- Family: Asteraceae
- Tribe: Gochnatieae
- Genus: Nahuatlea; V.A.Funk (2017)

Species
- 7; see text

= Nahuatlea =

Genus of flowering plants

Nahuatlea is a genus of flowering plants in the sunflower family, Asteraceae. It includes seven species which range from southern Texas to southern Mexico.

The species which constitute genus Nahuatlea were originally placed in genus Gochnatia. It was later discovered that Gochnatia was not monophyletic, and included a number of distinct clades. In 2017 Vicki Funk combined Mexican species of Gochnatia into a new genus Nahuatlea. Funk concluded that the genus is a sister to the Caribbean genus Anastraphia, and their common ancestor originated from South America in a dispersal event, evidenced by the fact that the Mexican Gochnatia (now Nahuatlea) are more morphologically similar to the Andean members of Gochnatia than to Anastraphia.

== Species ==
Seven species are accepted.

- Nahuatlea arborescens (Brandegee) V.A.Funk
- Nahuatlea hiriartiana (Villaseñor, Medrano & Medina) V.A.Funk
- Nahuatlea hypoleuca (DC.) V.A.Funk
- Nahuatlea magna (M.C.Johnst. ex Cabrera) V.A.Funk
- Nahuatlea obtusata (S.F.Blake) V.A.Funk
- Nahuatlea purpusii (Brandegee) V.A.Funk
- Nahuatlea smithii (B.L.Rob. & Greenm.) V.A.Funk
