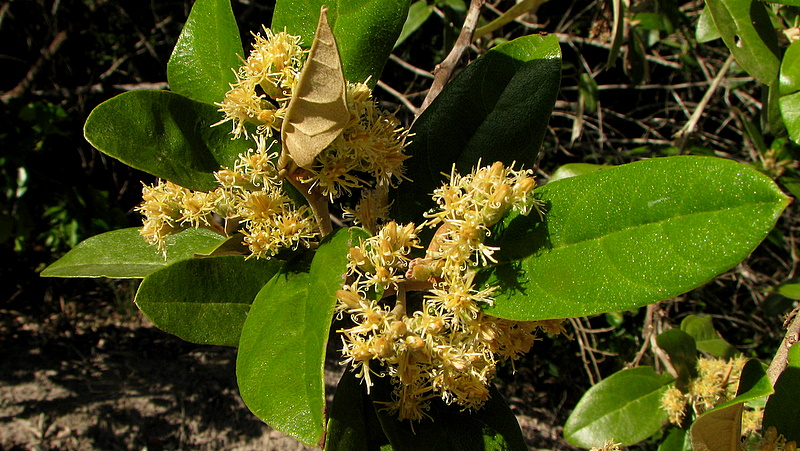
- Gochnatia oligocephala

Scientific classification
- Kingdom: Plantae
- Clade: Tracheophytes
- Clade: Angiosperms
- Clade: Eudicots
- Clade: Asterids
- Order: Asterales
- Family: Asteraceae
- Subfamily: Gochnatioideae (Benth. & Hook.f.) Panero & V.A.Funk
- Tribe: Gochnatieae; Panero & V.A.Funk

Genera
- Anastraphia D.Don; Cnicothamnus Griseb.; Cyclolepis Moq.; Gochnatia Kunth; Moquiniastrum (Cabrera) G.Sancho; Nahuatlea V.A.Funk; Richterago Kuntze; Tehuasca Panero; Vickia Roque & G.Sancho

= Gochnatioideae =

Subfamily of flowering plants

The Gochnatioideae are a subfamily of the aster family, Asteraceae. It contains the single tribe Gochnatieae of six to ten genera, with a total of about 80 to 95 species. They are native to the Americas from the southern United States to Argentina, including the Caribbean, and Cuba in particular.

These are trees, shrubs, subshrubs, and perennial herbs. They have alternately arranged leaves and some have basal rosettes. The inflorescence is a solitary flower head or a few or many. Some only have disc florets, and some also have ray florets. The heads are small, with just a few florets, or large, with hundreds. They are usually white to orange, but some species have pink or purple florets. The disc florets are tubular with deep lobes at the tips.

== Genera ==
Nine genera are currently accepted; ten if Pentaphorus is accepted as separate genus.

- Anastraphia D.Don
- Cnicothamnus Griseb.
- Cyclolepis Moq.
- Gochnatia Kunth (synonym Pentaphorus D.Don)
- Moquiniastrum (Cabrera) G.Sancho
- Nahuatlea V.A.Funk
- Richterago Kuntze
- Tehuasca Panero
- Vickia Roque & G.Sancho
