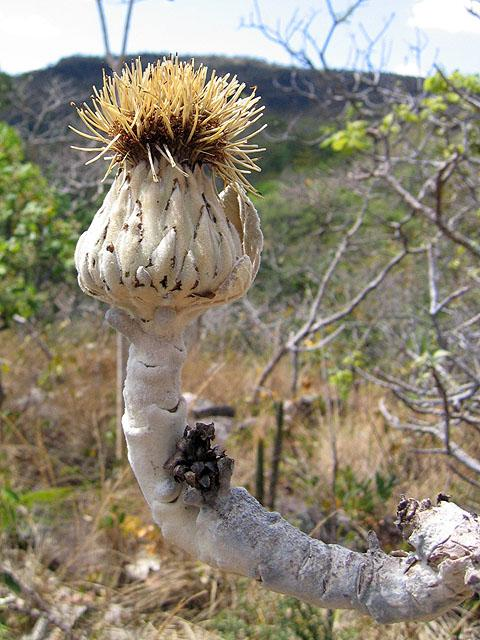
- Wunderlichia mirabilis

Scientific classification
- Kingdom: Plantae
- Clade: Tracheophytes
- Clade: Angiosperms
- Clade: Eudicots
- Clade: Asterids
- Order: Asterales
- Family: Asteraceae
- Subfamily: Wunderlichioideae; Panero & V.A.Funk

Tribes
- Hyalideae; Wunderlicheae

= Wunderlichioideae =

Subfamily of flowering plants

The Wunderlichioideae are a subfamily of flowering plants belonging to the family Asteraceae.

The subfamily includes eight genera and about 24 species that are concentrated in Brazil (Wunderlichia) and Guyana (Chimantaea, Stenopadus, and Stomatochaeta), with some species in other South America countries (Hyalis and Ianthopappus) and others (Nouelia and Leucomeris) in Southeast Asia and the Himalayas. Distinguishing features of the members of this subfamily are presence of styles with glabrous style branches and a deletion in the rpoB gene. Two tribes, Wunderlicheae and Hyalideae, are recognised.
