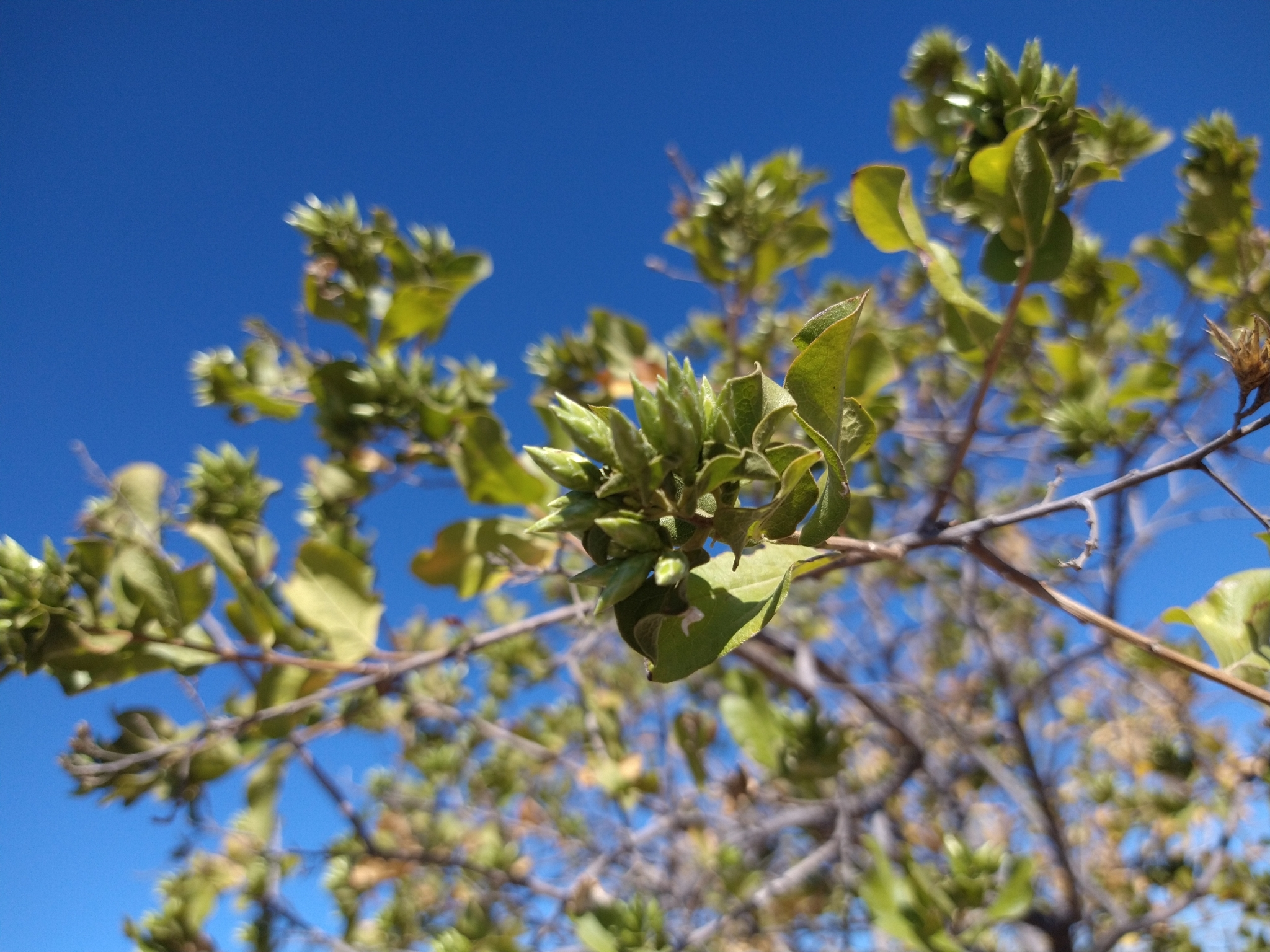

Scientific classification
- Kingdom: Plantae
- Clade: Tracheophytes
- Clade: Angiosperms
- Clade: Eudicots
- Clade: Asterids
- Order: Asterales
- Family: Asteraceae
- Genus: Nahuatlea
- Species: N. arborescens

Binomial name
- Nahuatlea arborescens (T.S. Brandegee) V.A. Funk, 2017

Synonyms
- Gochnatia arborescens T.S. Brandegee, 1903

= Nahuatlea arborescens =

Species of tree

Nahuatlea aborescens is a species of tree in the Composite family endemic to the Cape region and Cerralvo Island of Baja California Sur, commonly known as ocote. It grows up to 8 meters tall, with monoecious tan-colored flowers and short, leafy branchlets. It was formerly in the genus Gochnatia, where it was known commonly as the tree gochnatia.

== Description ==
This plant grows in a tree habit, 3 to 8 m tall, and with a trunk 20 to 30 cm in diameter. The leaves are chartaceous (meaning resembling paper or parchment), and shaped ovate to elliptic, glabrescent (nearly smooth) on both faces. The leaf blades are 3.5 to 6.5 cm long by 2.5 to 4.5 cm wide. The leaf petiole is 5 mm long.

The inflorescence is crowded at the ends of the branches. The flower heads are solitary or more usually in loose clusters of 2 to 20 at the apex of the branches, with few clusters per plant. There are 13 to 20 flowers per head, with yellowish corollas, 12 mm long. The involucre is shaped cylindrical to narrowly obconic depending on age, and is 10 to 15 mm tall by 6 to 8 mm wide at anthesis, with the bracts in 8 to 10 series.

== Taxonomy ==
This species was first described by Townshend Stith Brandegee as Gochnatia arborescens in 1903. In later years, it was discovered that the genus Gochnatia was not monophyletic, but in fact composed of a number of distinct clades. The Mexican species of Gochnatia were then combined into a new genus Nahuatlea, by Vicki Funk in 2017. Funk suggested that the genus originated from South America in a dispersal event, evidenced by the fact that the Mexican Gochnatia (now Nahuatlea) are more morphologically similar to the Andean members of Gochnatia.

== Distribution and habitat ==
This species is endemic to the state of Baja California Sur in Mexico, which is on the Baja California Peninsula. It is distributed from the Sierra de La Giganta to the Cape region of the peninsula and on Cerralvo Island in the Gulf of California. It is found in arroyos and along roads in agricultural areas.
