= Pitcairnia funkiae =

Scientific classification
- Kingdom: Plantae
- Clade: Tracheophytes
- Clade: Angiosperms
- Clade: Monocots
- Clade: Commelinids
- Order: Poales
- Family: Bromeliaceae
- Genus: Pitcairnia
- Species: P. funkiae

Binomial name
- Pitcairnia funkiae Spencer

Species of flowering plant

Pitcairnia funkiae is a plant species in the genus Pitcairnia. This species is native to Costa Rica. It is similar in appearance to Pitcairnia atrorubens.

Pitcairnia funkiae is named for its collector Vicki Funk.
