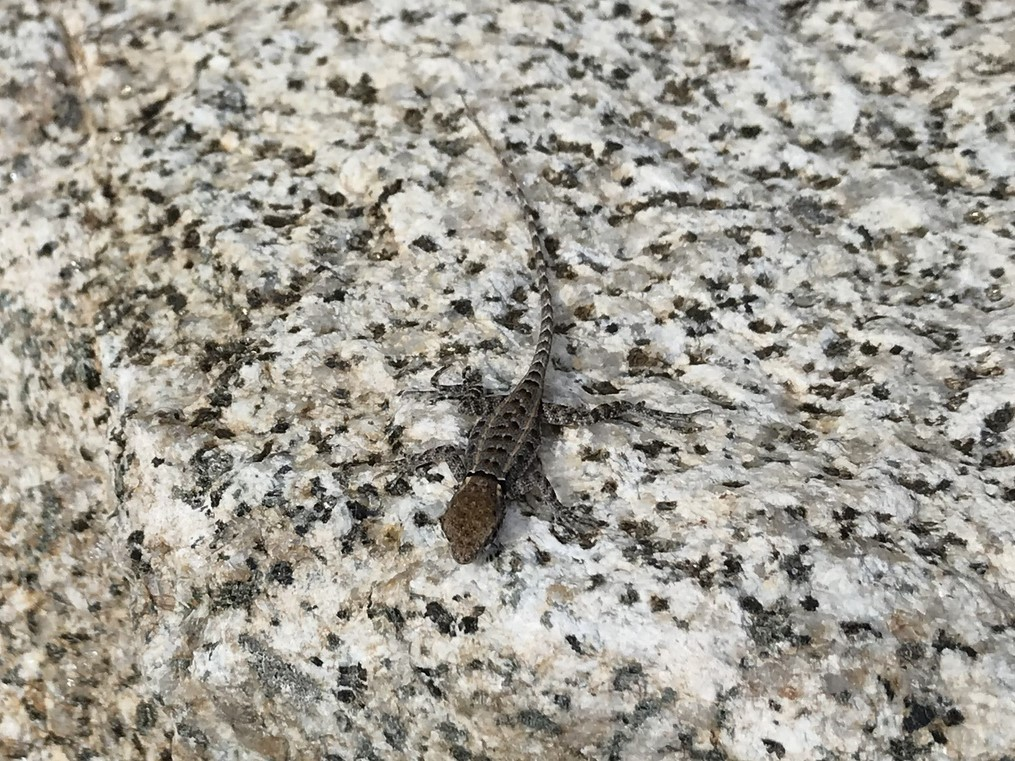

Conservation status
- Least Concern (IUCN 3.1)

Scientific classification
- Kingdom: Animalia
- Phylum: Chordata
- Class: Reptilia
- Order: Squamata
- Suborder: Iguania
- Family: Phrynosomatidae
- Genus: Sceloporus
- Species: S. grandaevus

Binomial name
- Sceloporus grandaevus (Dickerson, 1919)

= Sceloporus grandaevus =

Species of lizard

Sceloporus grandaevus, often called the Cerralvo Island sator, is a species of lizard that can grow up to 3.2 inches in length. It is found in Mexico, and is endemic to the Cerralvo Island in the Gulf of California.

== Habitat ==
S. grandaevus lives in shrublands, inland cliffs, mountains peaks, and deserts of its range. This species can be found in vegetated areas, with coastal dunes and open flats nearby that have vegetation.

== Conservation ==
S. grandaevus occurs in at least one protected area. Its population is stable, and although its range is only less than 200 km², it is abundant, and can adapt to changes. Its island is not very populated with humans, due to there being no water, so it is not at risk with future invasive species or natural disasters. In the future, this species may come to threat if there are invasive species, tourism, and overcollection. For these reasons, it is listed as "Least Concern" by the IUCN Red List.
