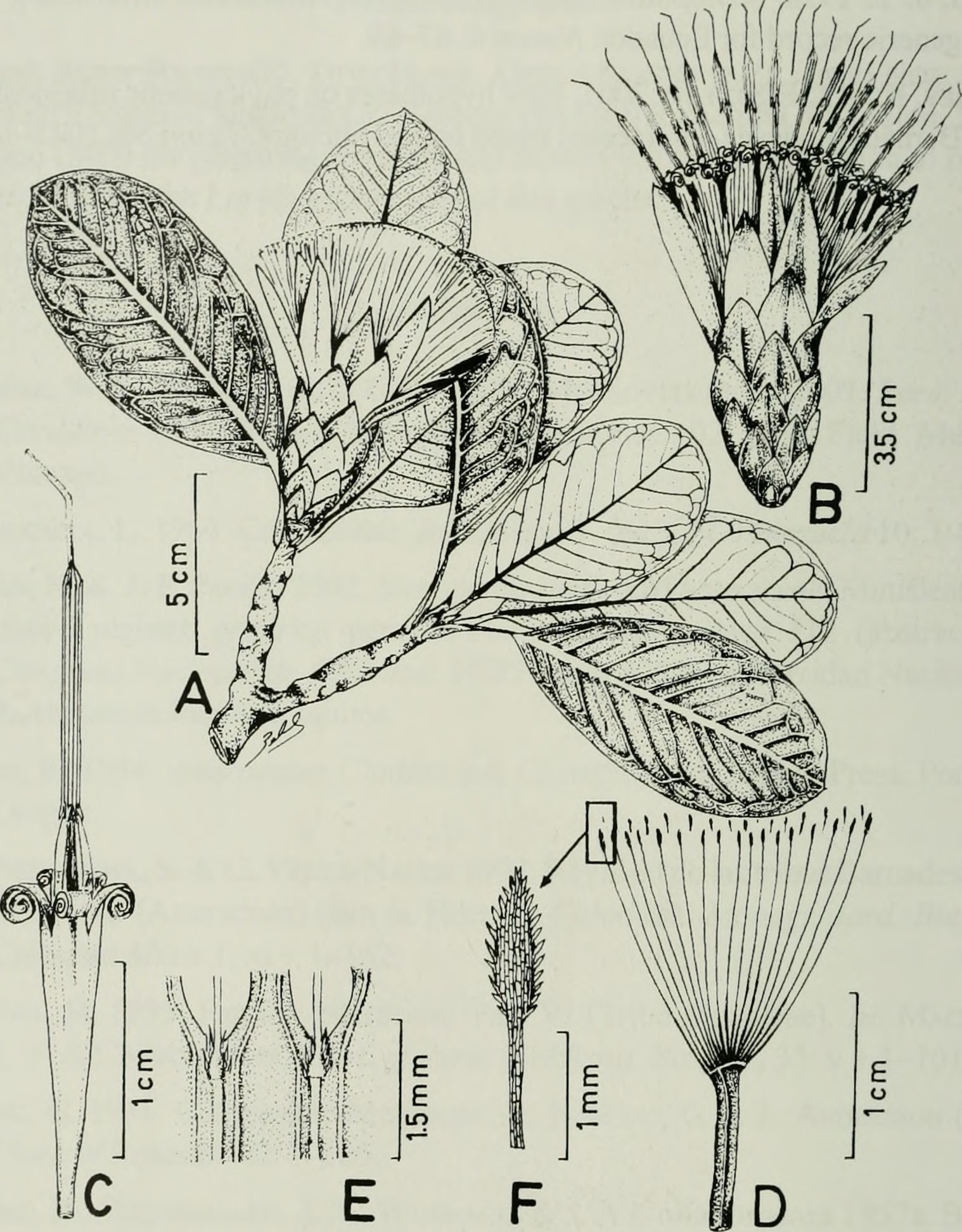
- Stenopadus andicola

Scientific classification
- Kingdom: Plantae
- Clade: Embryophytes
- Clade: Tracheophytes
- Clade: Spermatophytes
- Clade: Angiosperms
- Clade: Eudicots
- Clade: Asterids
- Order: Asterales
- Family: Asteraceae
- Subfamily: Wunderlichioideae
- Tribe: Wunderlichieae
- Genus: Stenopadus; S.F.Blake

= Stenopadus =

Genus of flowering plants

Stenopadus is a genus of South American plants in the family Asteraceae. It includes 15 species native to tropical South America, including Colombia, Ecuador, Peru, Venezuela, Guyana, and northern Brazil.

== Species ==
15 species are accepted.

- Stenopadus andicola Pruski
- Stenopadus aracaensis Pruski
- Stenopadus campestris Maguire & Wurdack
- Stenopadus chimantensis Maguire, Steyerm. & Wurdack
- Stenopadus colombianus Cuatrec. & Steyerm.
- Stenopadus colveei (Steyerm.) Pruski
- Stenopadus connellii S.F.Blake
- Stenopadus cucullatus Maguire & Wurdack
- Stenopadus huachamacari Maguire
- Stenopadus jauensis Aristeg.
- Stenopadus kunhardtii Maguire
- Stenopadus megacephalus Pruski
- Stenopadus obconicus Maguire & Wurdack
- Stenopadus sericeus Maguire & Aristeg.
- Stenopadus talaumifolius S.F.Blake

=== Formerly included ===
See Chimantaea and Stomatochaeta.

- Stenopadus cinereus - Chimantaea cinerea
- Stenopadus condensatus - Stomatochaeta condensata
- Stenopadus crassifolius S.F.Blake – Stomatochaeta crassifolia (S.F.Blake) Maguire & Wurdack
- Stenopadus cymbifolius - Stomatochaeta cymbifolia
- Stenopadus guaiquinimensis - Stomatochaeta condensata
- Stenopadus variabilis - Stomatochaeta condensata
