= Cerralvo =

Cerralvo may refer to:

- Cerralvo Municipality
- Ciudad Cerralvo
- Rodrigo Pacheco, 3rd Marquis of Cerralvo
- Cerralvo Island
