= Stephanbeckia =

Scientific classification
- Kingdom: Plantae
- Clade: Tracheophytes
- Clade: Angiosperms
- Clade: Eudicots
- Clade: Asterids
- Order: Asterales
- Family: Asteraceae
- Genus: Stephanbeckia; H.Rob. & V.A.Funk
- Species: S. plumosa

Binomial name
- Stephanbeckia plumosa H.Rob. & V.A.Funk

Genus of plants

Stephanbeckia is a monotypic genus of flowering plants belonging to the family Asteraceae. The only species is Stephanbeckia plumosa.

The species is found in Bolivia.
