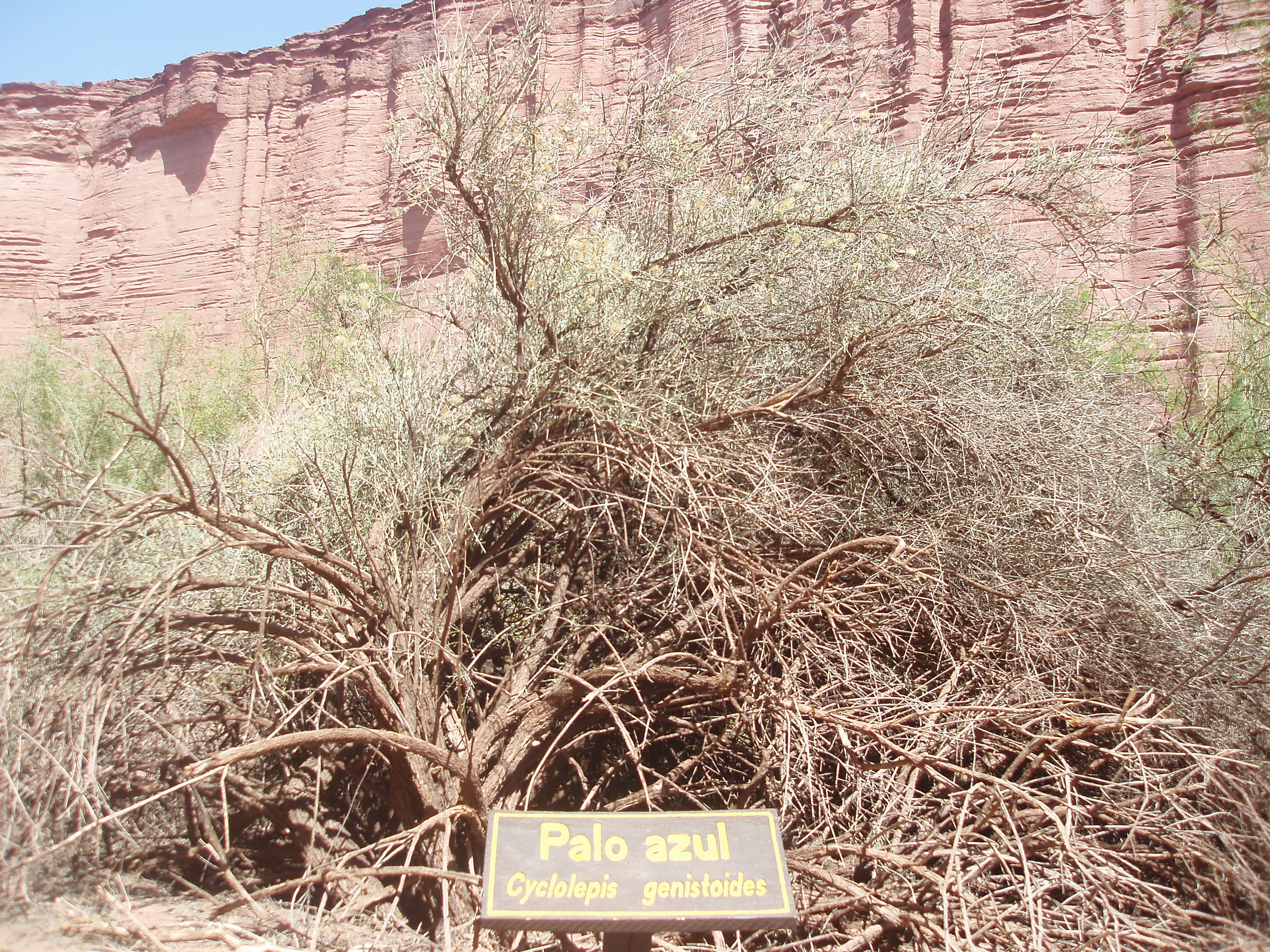

Scientific classification
- Kingdom: Plantae
- Clade: Tracheophytes
- Clade: Angiosperms
- Clade: Eudicots
- Clade: Asterids
- Order: Asterales
- Family: Asteraceae
- Subfamily: Gochnatioideae
- Tribe: Gochnatieae
- Genus: Cyclolepis; Gillies ex D.Don
- Species: C. genistoides

Binomial name
- Cyclolepis genistoides D.Don

= Cyclolepis =

Genus of flowering plants

Cyclolepis is a monotypic genus of flowering plants in the family Asteraceae. The sole species, Cyclolepis genistoides, is native to South America, where it occurs in Argentina, Chile, Paraguay, and possibly Bolivia. Its common names include matorro negro.

This is a dominant halophytic shrub in some saline habitat types, such as coastal habitat near Bahía Blanca and the inland salt marshes of central Argentina.
