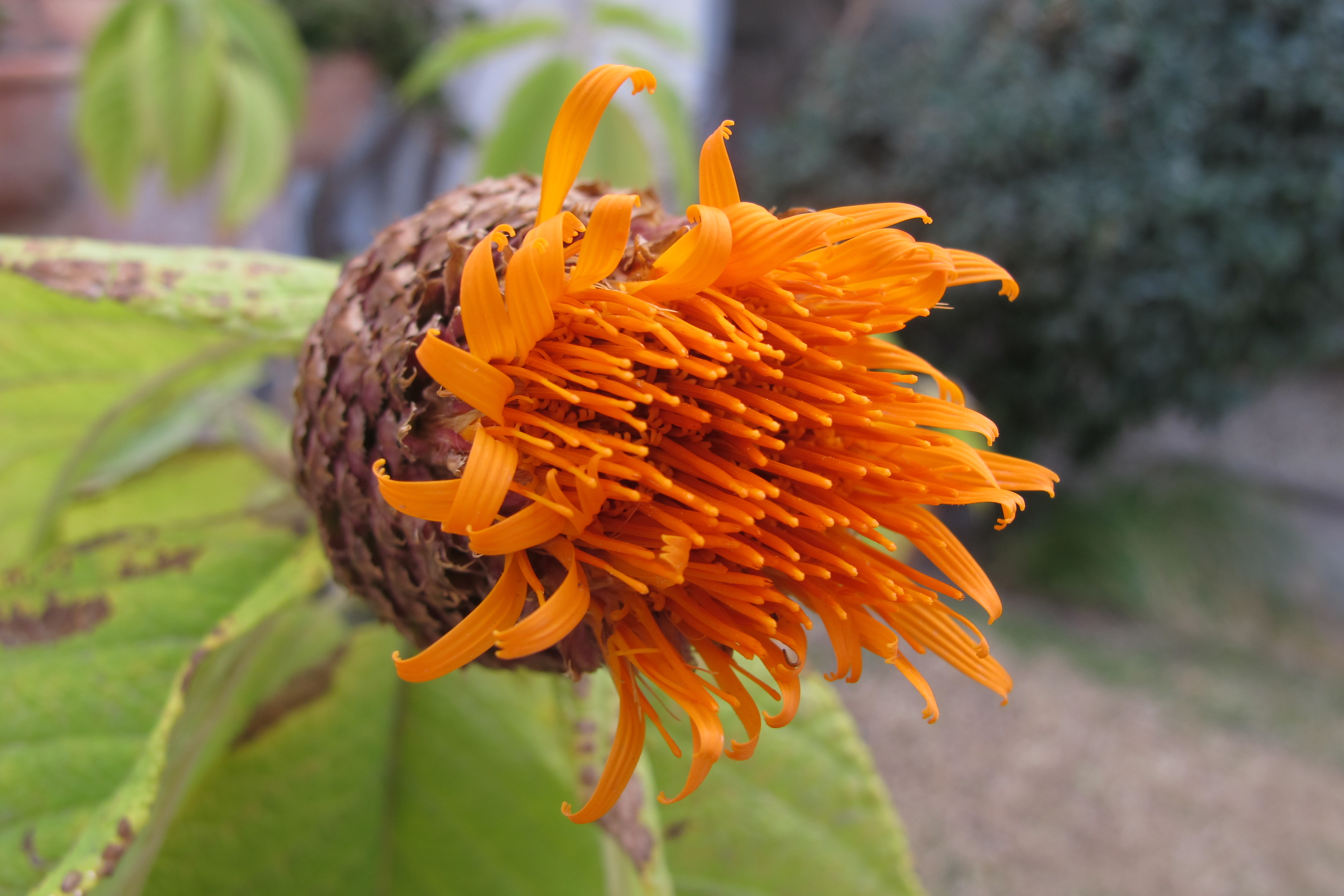
- Cnicothamnus lorentzii

Scientific classification
- Kingdom: Plantae
- Clade: Embryophytes
- Clade: Tracheophytes
- Clade: Angiosperms
- Clade: Eudicots
- Clade: Asterids
- Order: Asterales
- Family: Asteraceae
- Subfamily: Gochnatioideae
- Tribe: Gochnatieae
- Genus: Cnicothamnus; Griseb.

Type species
- Cnicothamnus lorentzii Griseb.

Synonyms
- Lefrovia Franch.

= Cnicothamnus =

Genus of flowering plants

Cnicothamnus is a genus of flowering plants in the family Asteraceae. Its species are small trees which can reach 5m in height, bearing alternate ovate and dentate leaves with a whitish pubescence. The inflorescences, borne at branch tips, are bell-shaped capitula of a bright orange colour, and usually appear during local winter. Their fruit (which can be described as a cypsela) bears a rough plume.

Species

- Cnicothamnus azafran, native to Argentina, Bolivia, and Paraguay
- Cnicothamnus lorentzii, native to Argentina and Bolivia
