= Ianthopappus =

Scientific classification
- Kingdom: Plantae
- Clade: Tracheophytes
- Clade: Angiosperms
- Clade: Eudicots
- Clade: Asterids
- Order: Asterales
- Family: Asteraceae
- Subfamily: Wunderlichioideae
- Tribe: Hyalideae
- Genus: Ianthopappus; Roque & D.J.N.Hind
- Species: I. corymbosus

Binomial name
- Ianthopappus corymbosus (Less.) Roque & D.J.N. Hind.

Synonyms
- Gochnatia corymbosa Less.; Actinoseris corymbosa (Less.) Cabrera; Onoseris corymbosa (Less.) Benth. & Hook.f.

Genus of flowering plants

Ianthopappus is a genus of South American flowering plants in the family Asteraceae.

Species

The only known species is Ianthopappus corymbosus, native to Brazil (Rio Grande do Sul), Argentina (Corrientes) and Uruguay (Artigas).
