= Vickifunkia =

Scientific classification
- Kingdom: Plantae
- Clade: Tracheophytes
- Clade: Angiosperms
- Clade: Eudicots
- Clade: Asterids
- Order: Asterales
- Family: Asteraceae
- Subfamily: Asteroideae
- Tribe: Senecioneae
- Subtribe: Tussilagininae
- Genus: Vickifunkia; C.Ren, L.Wang, I.D.Illar. & Q.E.Yang

Genus of flowering plants

Vickifunkia is a genus of flowering plants in the family Asteraceae. It includes ten species native to Central Asia, Afghanistan, the Himalayas, Xinjiang, Mongolia, and western Siberia.

In 2020, an international team of botanists (Chen Ren, Long Wang, Irina Illarionova, and Qin-Er Yang) segregated a distinct section of the genus Ligularia (Ligularia sect. Stenostegia) into an independent genus, Vickifunkia, based on morphological and molecular phylogenetic studies. The genus was named in honor of Vicki Ann Funk (1947–2019), a distinguished American botanist, systematist, and curator at the Smithsonian National Museum of Natural History.

== Species ==
Ten species are accepted.

- Vickifunkia altissima (Pojark.) C.Ren, L.Wang, I.D.Illar. & Q.E.Yang
- Vickifunkia karataviensis (Lipsch.) C.Ren, L.Wang, I.D.Illar. & Q.E.Yang
- Vickifunkia kareliniana (Stschegl.) C.Ren, L.Wang, I.D.Illar. & Q.E.Yang
- Vickifunkia narynensis (C.Winkl.) C.Ren, L.Wang, I.D.Illar. & Q.E.Yang
- Vickifunkia robusta (Ledeb.) C.Ren, L.Wang, I.D.Illar. & Q.E.Yang
- Vickifunkia schischkinii (Rubtz.) C.Ren, L.Wang, I.D.Illar. & Q.E.Yang
- Vickifunkia sibirica (L.f.) Sennikov
- Vickifunkia songarica (Fisch.) C.Ren, L.Wang, I.D.Illar. & Q.E.Yang
- Vickifunkia thomsonii (C.B.Clarke) C.Ren, L.Wang, I.D.Illar. & Q.E.Yang
- Vickifunkia tianschanica (Chang Y.Yang & S.L.Keng) C.Ren, L.Wang, I.D.Illar. & Q.E.Yang
