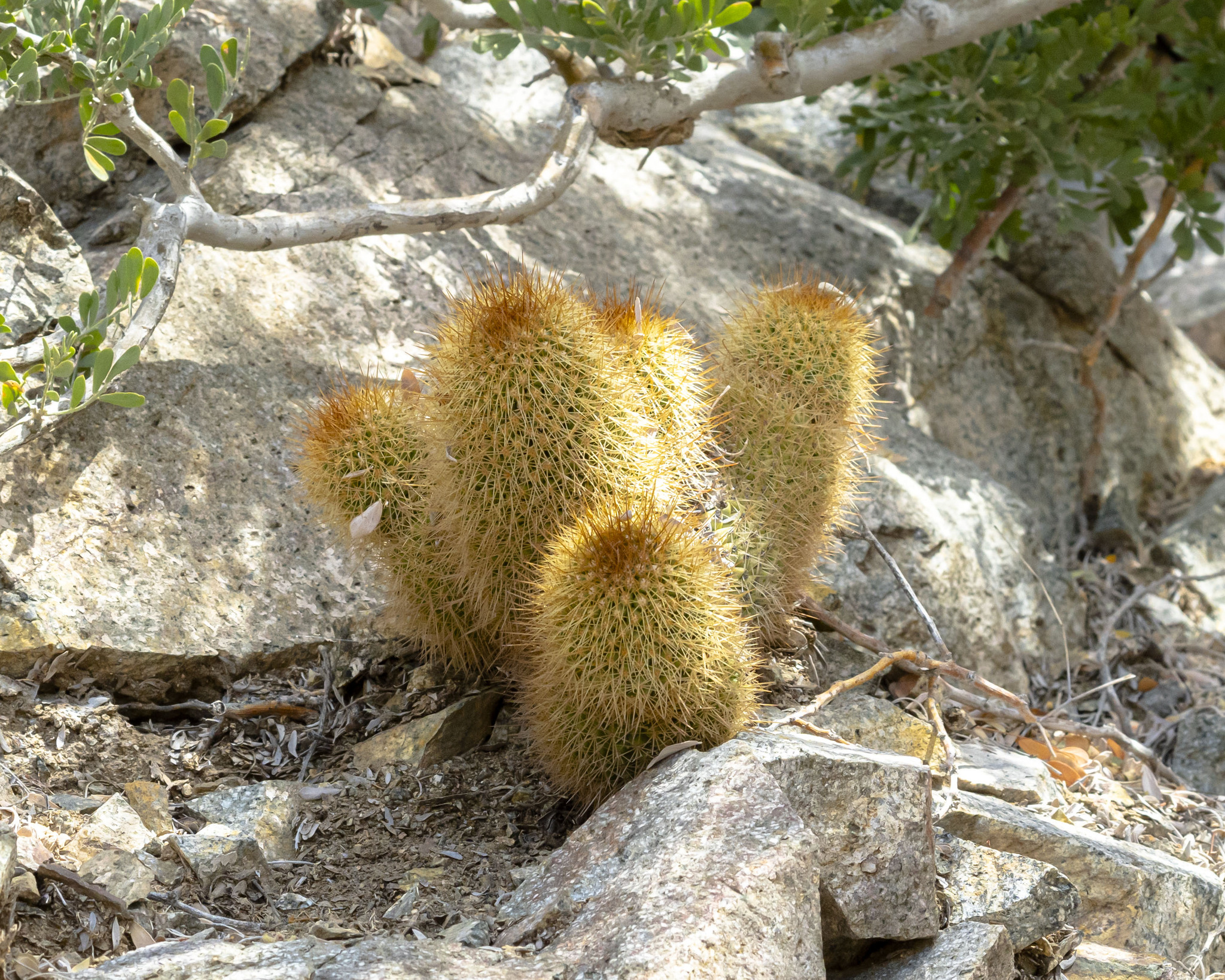
- In habitat on Cerralvo Island

Conservation status
- Least Concern (IUCN 3.1)

Scientific classification
- Kingdom: Plantae
- Clade: Tracheophytes
- Clade: Angiosperms
- Clade: Eudicots
- Order: Caryophyllales
- Family: Cactaceae
- Subfamily: Cactoideae
- Genus: Cochemiea
- Species: C. cerralboa

Binomial name
- Cochemiea cerralboa (Britton & Rose) P.B.Breslin & Majure

Synonyms
- List: Bartschella cerralboa (Britton & Rose) Doweld 2000; Mammillaria armillata subsp. cerralboa (Britton & Rose) D.R.Hunt 1997; Mammillaria cerralboa (Britton & Rose) Orcutt 1926; Mammillaria dioica var. cerralboa (Britton & Rose) Neutel. 1986; Neomammillaria cerralboa Britton & Rose 1923

= Cochemiea cerralboa =

Species of cactus

Cochemiea cerralboa is a rare species of cactus in the genus Cochemiea commonly known as the Cerralvo nipple cactus. It is only found on Cerralvo Island in Baja California Sur, Mexico.

== Description ==
Cochemiea cerralboa typically grows solitary and rarely forms groups. Its slender cylindrical shoots reach up to 20 cm (7.9 in) in height and 3 to 4 cm (1.2 to 1.6 in) in diameter. The yellowish-green warts are firm, conical to cylindrical, and lack milky juice. Axillae have short bristles. The plant features a strong, straight or sometimes hooked yellowish central spine, 1 to 2 cm (0.39 to 0.79 in) long, and about 10 yellow, straight radial spines, each up to 2 cm (0.79 in) long.

The funnel-shaped flowers are white with pinkish-brown central stripes, up to 2 cm (0.79 in) long and wide. The club-shaped fruits vary from greenish to purple-red and contain black seeds.

== Taxonomy ==
It was first described as Neomammillaria cerralboa by Nathaniel Lord Britton and Joseph Nelson Rose in 1923. In 2021, Peter B. Breslin and Lucas C. Majure reclassified it into the genus Cochemiea.

== Distribution ==
Cochemiea cerralboa is endemic to Cerralvo Island, the southernmost island in the Gulf of California, belonging to the state of Baja California Sur in Mexico.

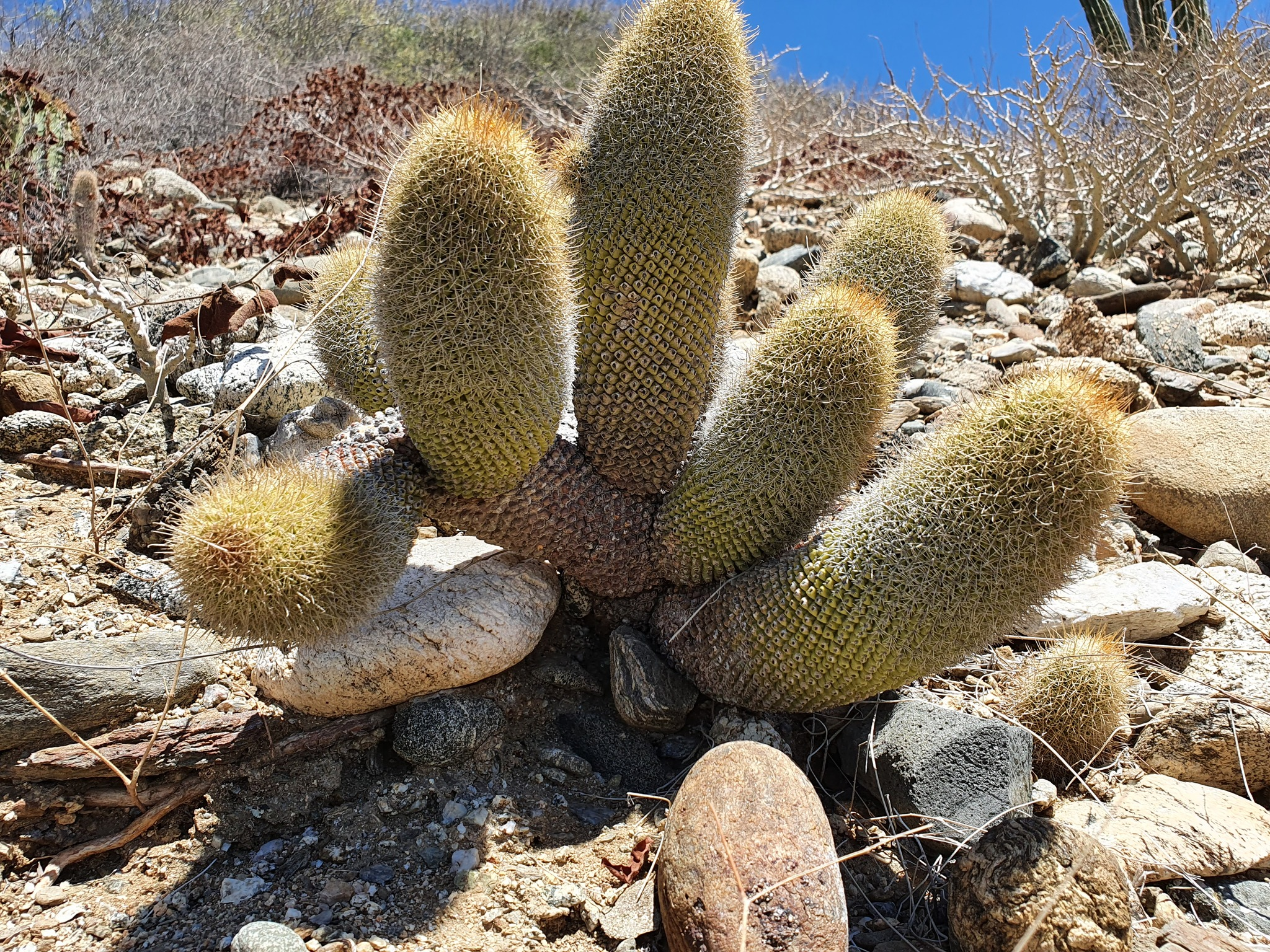
Plant growing in habitat

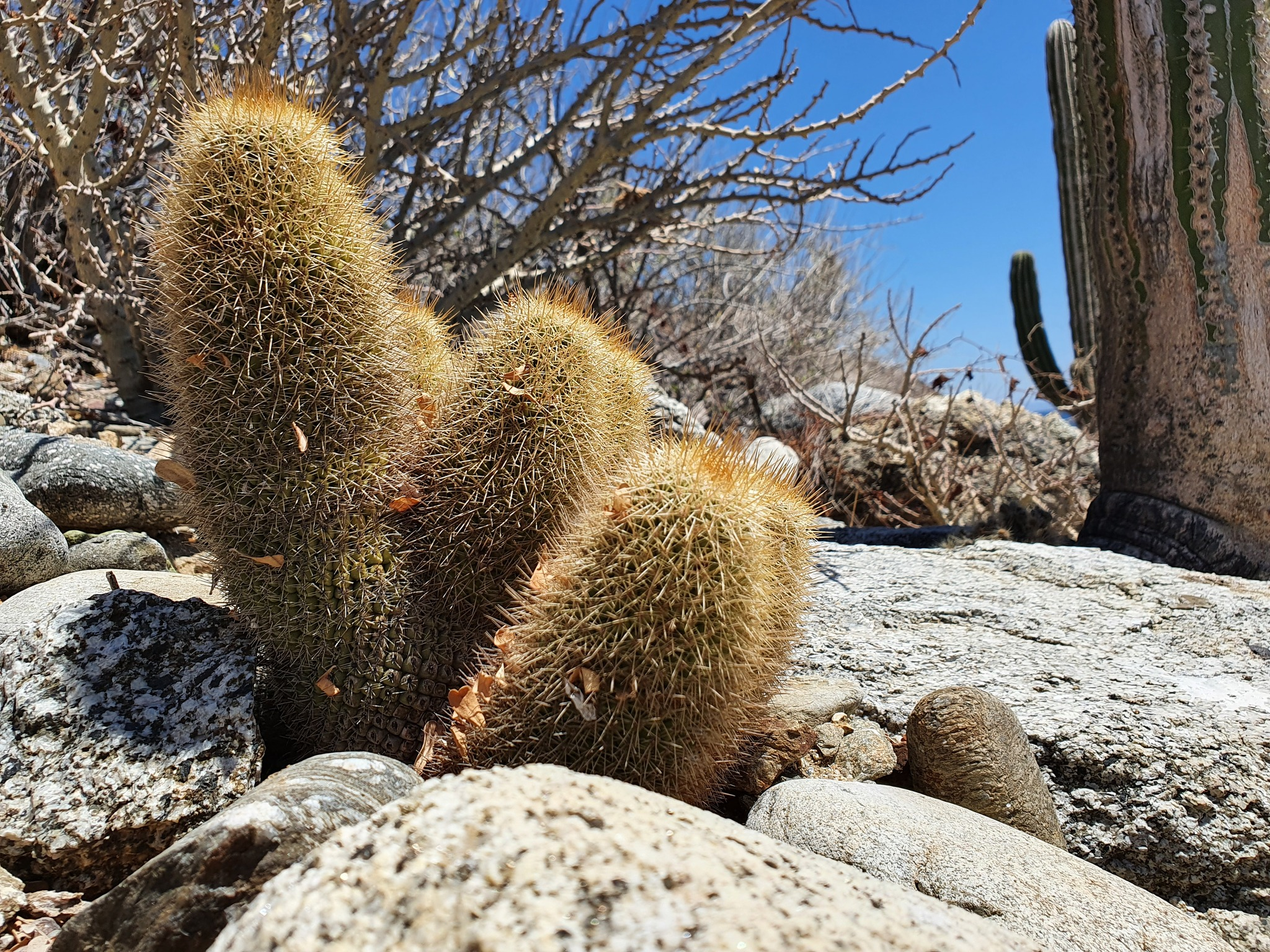

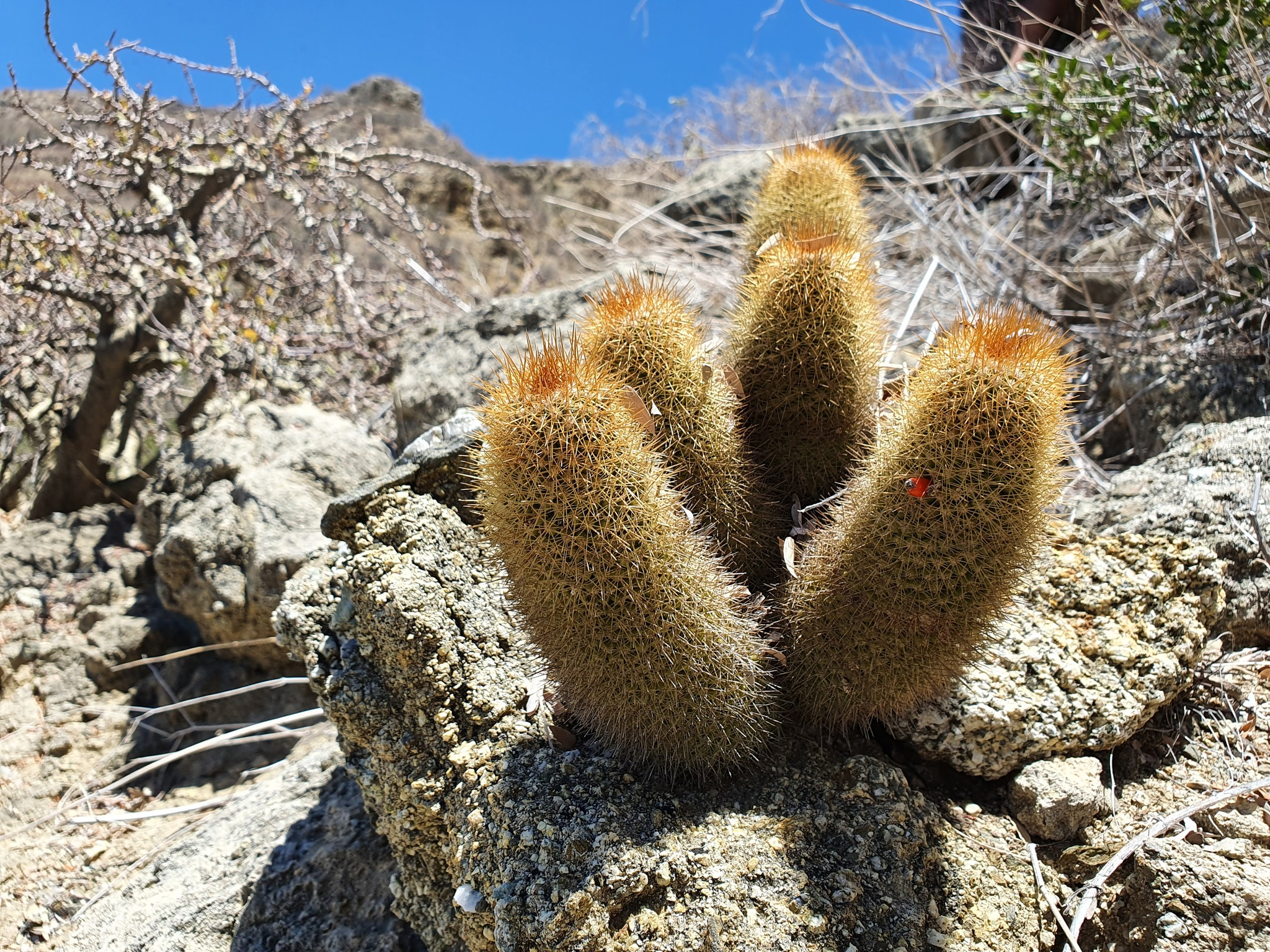

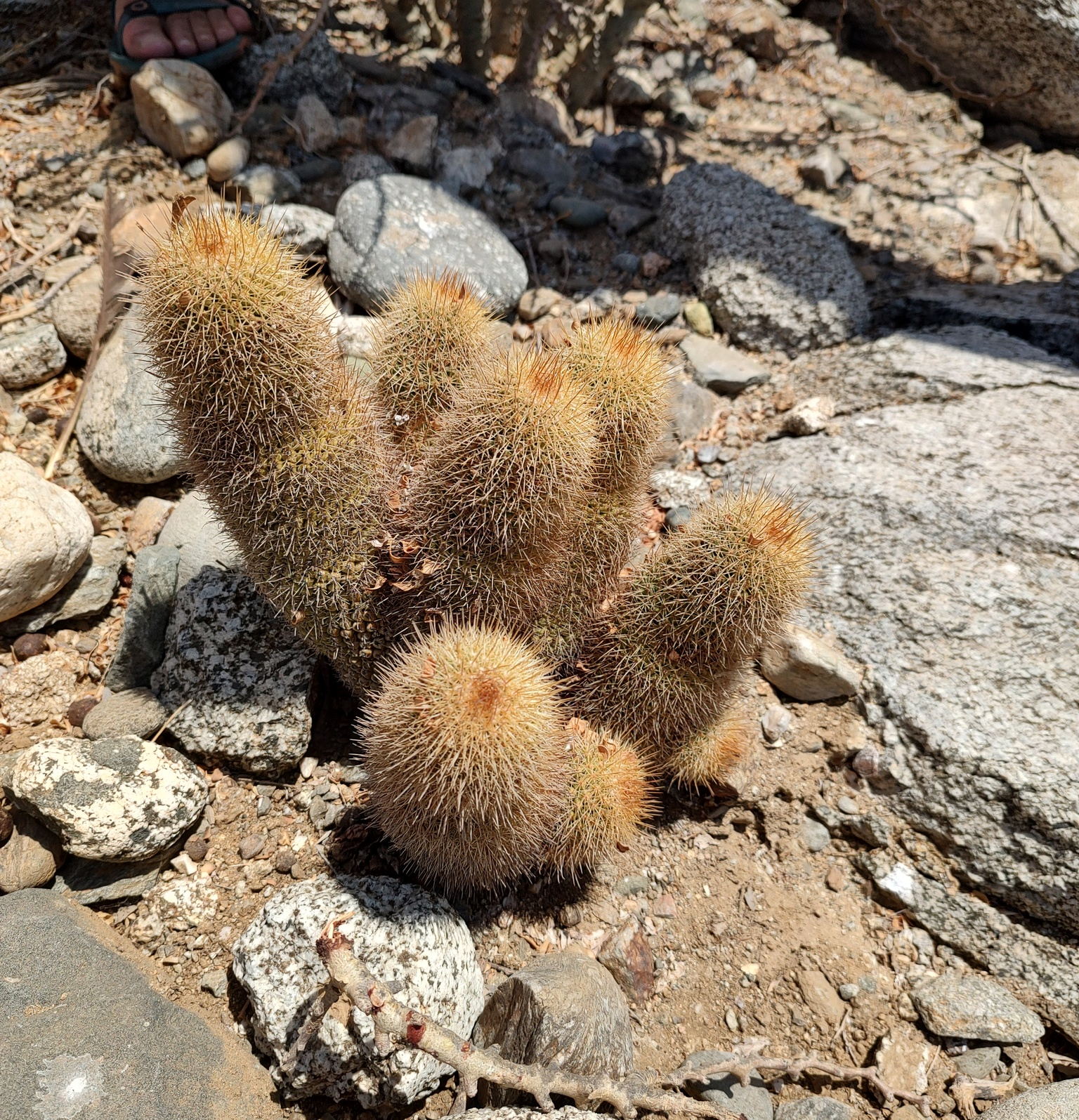
