= La Ventana =

- Location in Baja California Sur
- Coordinates: 24°03′01″N 109°59′20″W
- Country: Mexico
- State: Baja California Sur
- Municipality: La Paz
- Elevation: 6.6 ft (2 m)

Population (2010)
  - City: 255
  - Urban: 0

La Ventana is a small fishing village on the shore of La Ventana Bay south of La Paz on the eastern side of the Baja California peninsula in the Mexican state of Baja California Sur. The village was founded in the early 1940s by the La Paz pearl diver Salome Leon. When pearl diving became unprofitable, Salome brought his family over the mountains from La Paz to La Ventana Bay to found the village. Many of his descendants continue to live, fish, and work in the village.

== History ==
The area was first inhabited by Neolithic hunter-gatherers at least 10,000 years ago who left traces of their existence in the form of rock paintings near the city and throughout the Baja California Peninsula. Hernán Cortés sailed into Bahía de La Paz on May 3, 1535. He attempted to start a colony but abandoned his efforts after several years due to logistical problems. Sebastián Vizcaíno arrived in 1596 as part of a pearl-fishing expedition on the western shore of the Gulf of California. He sailed on to La Paz after attempts to pacify the area were rebuffed. The first permanent settlement in Baja California was not formed until 1695 further north in Loreto.

== Name origin ==
La Ventana (English "The Window") is named for the 'window' to the Gulf of California between nearby Isla Cerralvo and Punta Arena, which contrasted with the closed-in La Paz Bay from which the first inhabitants relocated.
