= Richterago radiata =

Scientific classification
- Kingdom: Plantae
- Clade: Embryophytes
- Clade: Tracheophytes
- Clade: Angiosperms
- Clade: Eudicots
- Clade: Asterids
- Order: Asterales
- Family: Asteraceae
- Genus: Richterago
- Species: R. radiata

Binomial name
- Richterago radiata (Vell.) Roque

Synonyms
- Actinoseris radiataa (Vell.) Cabrera; Ingenhusia radiata Vell.; Onoseris brevifolia D.Don; Seris denticulata DC.; Trichocline radiata (Vell.) S.F.Blake

Species of flowering plant

Richterago radiata is a species of flowering plant in the family daisy family. It is native to Brazil.
