= Anastraphia =

Scientific classification
- Kingdom: Plantae
- Clade: Embryophytes
- Clade: Tracheophytes
- Clade: Angiosperms
- Clade: Eudicots
- Clade: Asterids
- Order: Asterales
- Family: Asteraceae
- Subfamily: Gochnatioideae
- Tribe: Gochnatieae
- Genus: Anastraphia; D.Don (1830)

Type species
- Anastraphia ilicifolia D.Don

Species
- 33; see text

Genus of flowering plants

Anastraphia is a genus of flowering plants in the family Asteraceae. It includes 33 species native to the Caribbean, including Cuba, Hispaniola (Dominican Republic and Haiti), the Bahamas, and the Turks and Caicos Islands.

Several species formerly in Anastraphia have been transferred to the related genus Gochnatia.

== Species ==
33 species are accepted.

- Anastraphia attenuata Britton – Cuba
- Anastraphia buchii Urb. – Hispaniola
- Anastraphia calcicola Britton – Cuba
- Anastraphia cowellii Britton – Cuba
- Anastraphia crassifolia Britton – Cuba
- Anastraphia crebribracteata Ventosa & P.Herrera – Cuba
- Anastraphia cristalensis Ventosa & P.Herrera – Cuba
- Anastraphia cubensis Carabia – Cuba
- Anastraphia ekmanii Urb. – Cuba
- Anastraphia elliptica León – Cuba
- Anastraphia enneantha S.F.Blake – Dominican Republic
- Anastraphia geigeliae Ventosa & P.Herrera – Cuba
- Anastraphia gomezii León – Cuba
- Anastraphia herrerae Ventosa – Cuba
- Anastraphia ilicifolia D.Don – Cuba
- Anastraphia intertexta C.Wright ex Griseb. – Cuba
- Anastraphia maisiana León – Cuba
- Anastraphia mantuensis C.Wright ex Griseb. – Cuba
- Anastraphia microcephala Griseb. – Cuba
- Anastraphia montana Britton – Cuba
- Anastraphia northropiana Greenm. – Bahamas and Cuba
- Anastraphia obovata Urb. & Ekman – Haiti
- Anastraphia obtusifolia Britton – Cuba
- Anastraphia oligantha Urb. – Hispaniola
- Anastraphia oviedoae Ventosa & P.Herrera – Cuba
- Anastraphia parvifolia Britton – Cuba
- Anastraphia pauciflosculosa C.Wright ex Hitchc. – Bahamas and Turks and Caicos Islands
- Anastraphia picardae Urb. – Haiti
- Anastraphia recurva Britton – Cuba
- Anastraphia sessilis (Alain) Ventosa & V.A.Funk – Dominican Republic
- Anastraphia shaferi Britton – Cuba
- Anastraphia tortuensis Urb. – Haiti
- Anastraphia wilsonii Britton – Cuba
