= Stomatochaeta =

- Stomatochaeta condensata in Venezuela

Scientific classification
- Kingdom: Plantae
- Clade: Tracheophytes
- Clade: Angiosperms
- Clade: Eudicots
- Clade: Asterids
- Order: Asterales
- Family: Asteraceae
- Subfamily: Wunderlichioideae
- Tribe: Wunderlichieae
- Genus: Stomatochaeta (S.F.Blake) Maguire & Wurdack

Type species
- Stomatochaeta crassifolia (S.F.Blake) Maguire & Wurdack

Synonyms
- Stenopadus subg. Stomatochaeta S.F.Blake

Genus of plants

Stomatochaeta is a genus of South American plants in the family Asteraceae.

Species

- Stomatochaeta acuminata Pruski - Venezuela
- Stomatochaeta condensata (Baker) Maguire & Wurdack - Venezuela, Guyana, Roraima
- Stomatochaeta crassifolia (S.F.Blake) Maguire & Wurdack - Venezuela
- Stomatochaeta cylindrica Maguire & Wurdack - Venezuela
- Stomatochaeta cymbifolia (S.F.Blake) Maguire & Wurdack - Venezuela
- Stomatochaeta steyermarkii Aristeg. - Venezuela

formerly included

see Stenopadus

- Stomatochaeta colveei - Stenopadus colveei
