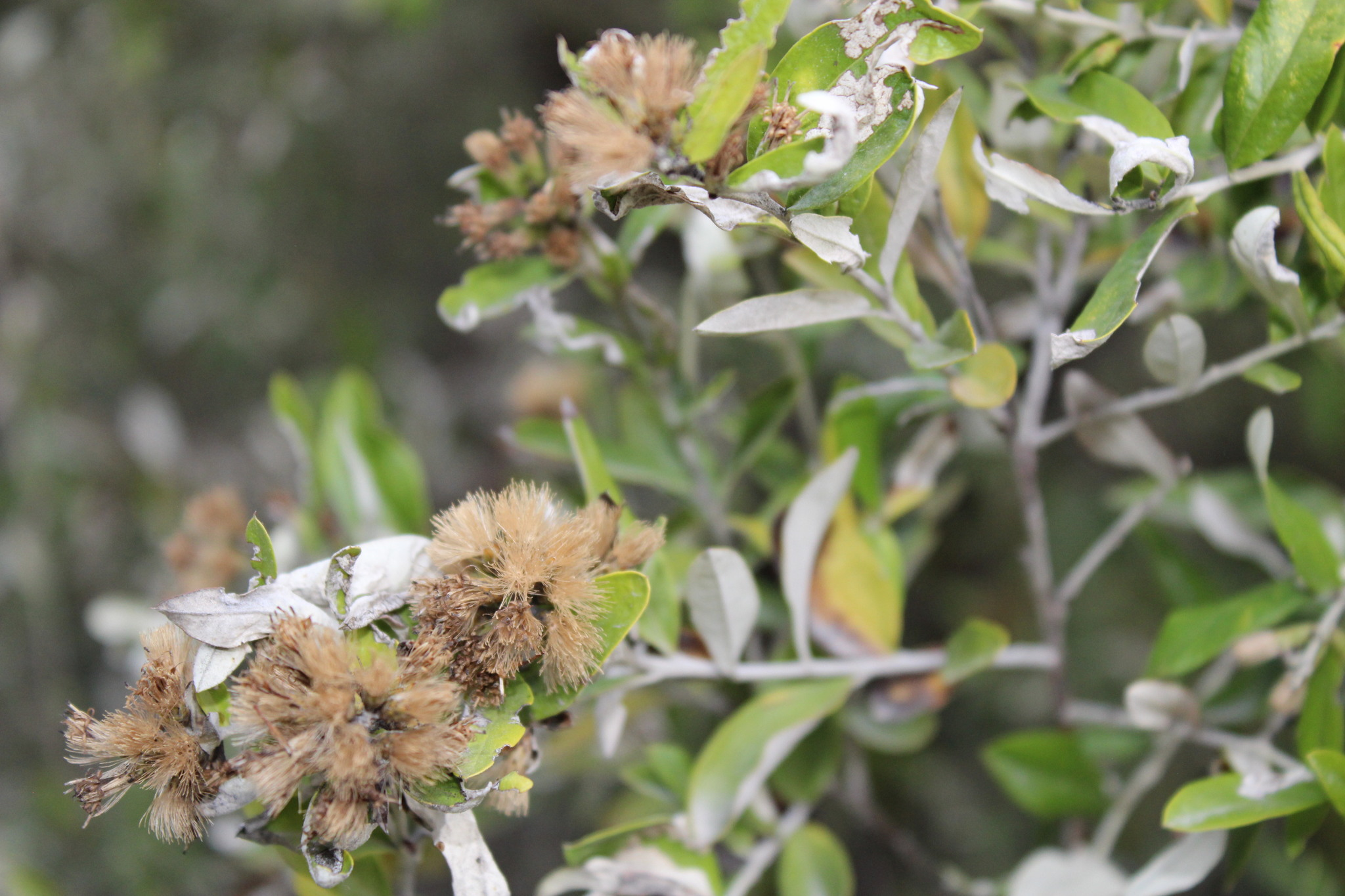

Scientific classification
- Kingdom: Plantae
- Clade: Tracheophytes
- Clade: Angiosperms
- Clade: Eudicots
- Clade: Asterids
- Order: Asterales
- Family: Asteraceae
- Genus: Nahuatlea
- Species: N. hypoleuca

Binomial name
- Nahuatlea hypoleuca (DC.) V.A.Funk (2017)

Synonyms
- Gochnatia hypoleuca (DC.) A.Gray (1883); Moquinia hypoleuca DC. (1838)

= Nahuatlea hypoleuca =

Species of flowering plant

Nahuatlea hypoleuca, the shrubby bullseye, is a North American species of plants in the family Asteraceae. It is native to northern Mexico (from Coahuila east to Tamaulipas and south as far as Oaxaca) and just north of the Río Grande in Texas.

Nahuatlea hypoleuca is a shrub, stems and undersides of the leaves covered with thick, white woolly hairs. Flower heads are in tight arrays, each head with numerous whitish flowers with lobed corollas. The plant grows in gravel and caliche soils in desert scrub vegetation.
