= Richterago =

Scientific classification
- Kingdom: Plantae
- Clade: Tracheophytes
- Clade: Angiosperms
- Clade: Eudicots
- Clade: Asterids
- Order: Asterales
- Family: Asteraceae
- Subfamily: Gochnatioideae
- Tribe: Gochnatieae
- Genus: Richterago; Kuntze

Synonyms
- Seris Less. 1830, illegitimate homonym not Willd. 1807; Actinoseris (Endl.) Cabrera; Seris [infragen.unranked] Actinoseris Endl.

Genus of plants

Richterago is a genus of Brazilian plants in the family Asteraceae.

Species

- Richterago amplexifolia (Gardner) Kuntze - Minas Gerais, Brasília
- Richterago angustifolia (Gardner) Roque - Minas Gerais
- Richterago arenaria (Baker) Roque - Minas Gerais
- Richterago campestris Roque & J.N.Nakaj. - Minas Gerais
- Richterago caulescens Roque - Minas Gerais
- Richterago conduplicata Roque - Minas Gerais
- Richterago discoidea (Less.) Kuntze - Minas Gerais, Bahia
- Richterago elegans Roque - Minas Gerais
- Richterago hatschbachii (Zardini) Roque - Minas Gerais
- Richterago lanata Roque - Minas Gerais
- Richterago petiolata Roque & J.N.Nakaj. - Minas Gerais, Goiás
- Richterago polymorpha (Less.) Roque - Minas Gerais
- Richterago polyphylla (Baker ex Baker) Ferreyra - Minas Gerais
- Richterago radiata (Vell.) Roque - Brazil
- Richterago riparia Roque - Minas Gerais
- Richterago stenophylla (Cabrera) Roque - Minas Gerais
- Richterago suffrutescens (Cabrera) Roque - Minas Gerais
