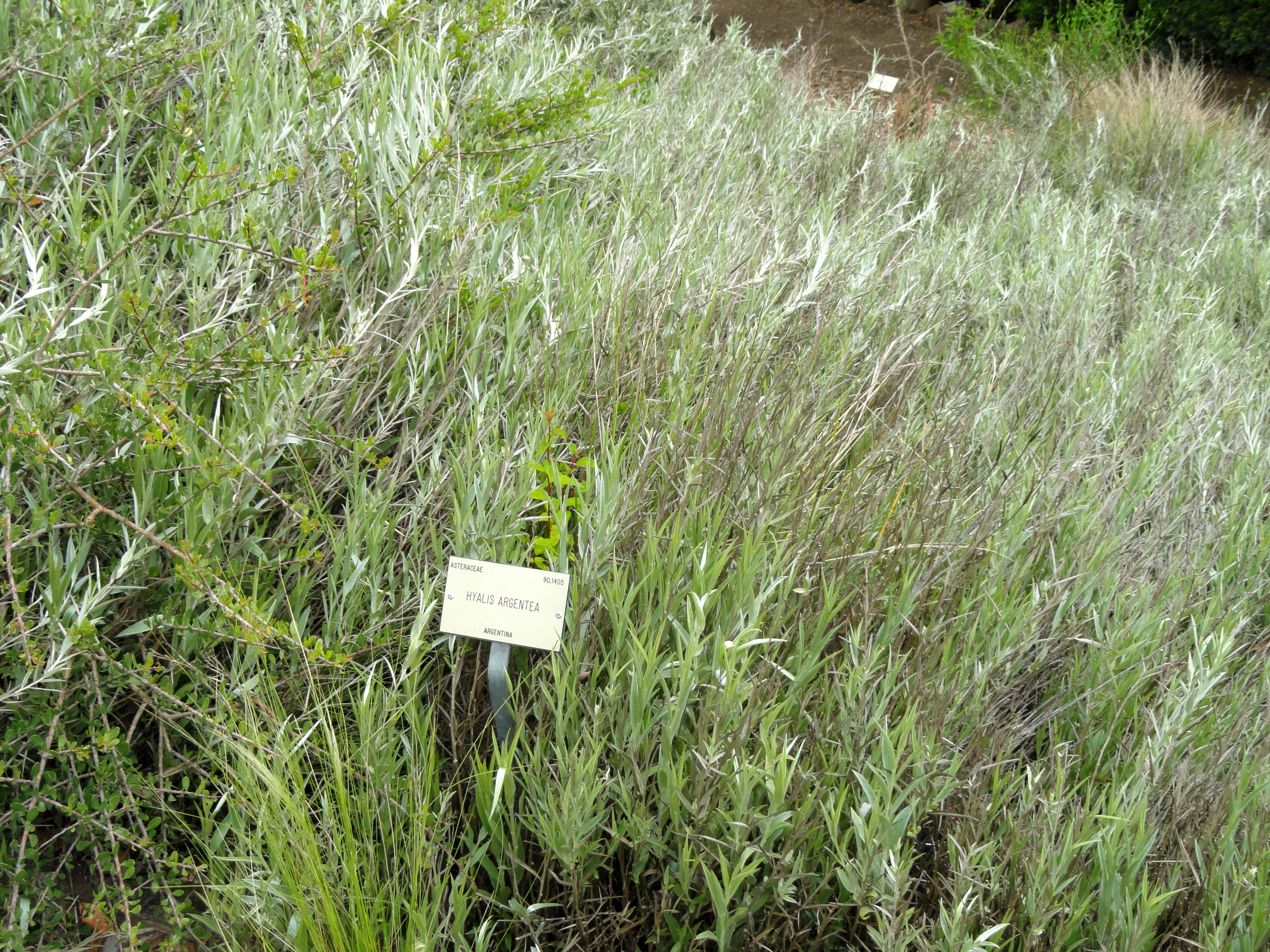
- Hyalis argentea

Scientific classification
- Kingdom: Plantae
- Clade: Embryophytes
- Clade: Tracheophytes
- Clade: Spermatophytes
- Clade: Angiosperms
- Clade: Eudicots
- Clade: Asterids
- Order: Asterales
- Family: Asteraceae
- Subfamily: Wunderlichioideae
- Tribe: Hyalideae
- Genus: Hyalis; D.Don ex Hook. & Arn.

Type species
- Hyalis argentea D.Don ex Hook. & Arn.

= Hyalis =

Genus of flowering plants

Hyalis is a genus of South American flowering plants in the family Asteraceae.

Species

- Hyalis argentea D.Don ex Hook. & Arn. - Bolivia
- Hyalis lancifolia Baker - Bolivia, Argentina, Paraguay

formerly included

see Aphyllocladus

- Hyalis spartioides (Wedd.) Benth. & Hook.f. ex Griseb. - Aphyllocladus spartioides Wedd.
