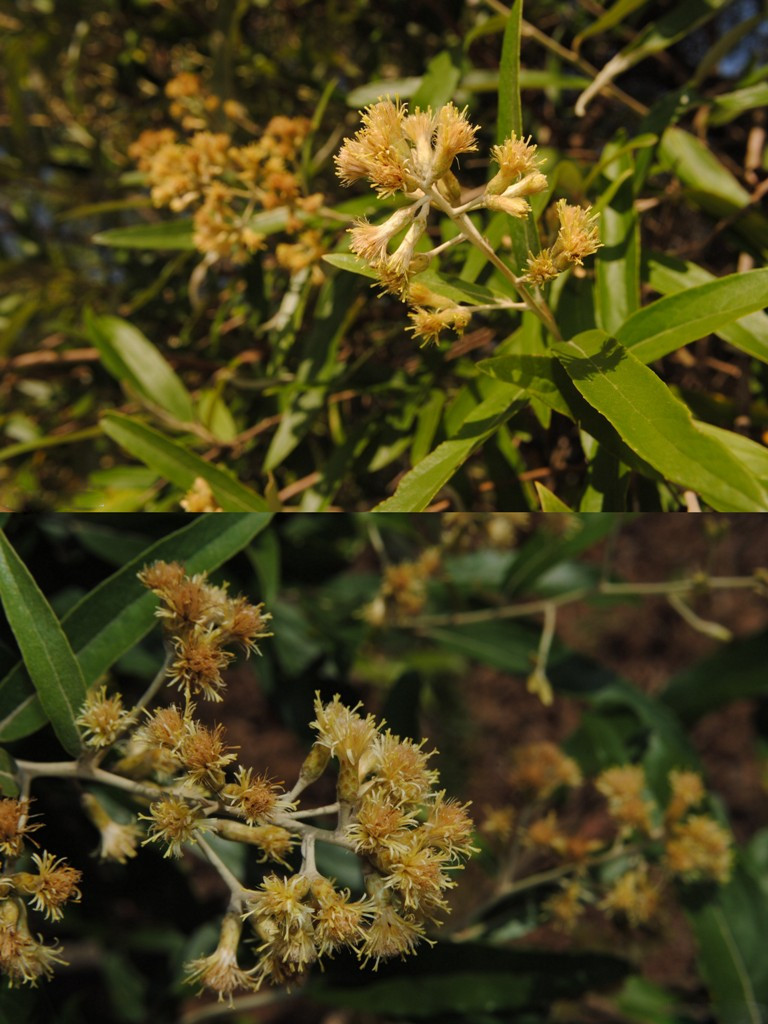

Scientific classification
- Kingdom: Plantae
- Clade: Tracheophytes
- Clade: Angiosperms
- Clade: Eudicots
- Clade: Asterids
- Order: Asterales
- Family: Asteraceae
- Subfamily: Gochnatioideae
- Tribe: Gochnatieae
- Genus: Moquiniastrum (Cabrera) G.Sancho

Synonyms
- Spadonia Less.

= Moquiniastrum =

Genus of flowering plant

Moquiniastrum is a genus of flowering plants belonging to the family Asteraceae.

Its native range is Venezuelan Antilles to Southern Tropical America. It is found in Argentina, Bolivia, Brazil, Paraguay, Uruguay, Venezuela and Venezuelan Antilles.

The genus name of Moquiniastrum is in honour of Alfred Moquin-Tandon (1804–1863), a French naturalist and doctor. It was first described and published in Phytotaxa Vol.147 on page 29 in 2013.

== Known species ==
According to Kew:

- Moquiniastrum argentinum (Cabrera) G.Sancho
- Moquiniastrum argyreum (Dusén ex Malme) G.Sancho
- Moquiniastrum barrosoae (Cabrera) G.Sancho
- Moquiniastrum blanchetianum (DC.) G.Sancho
- Moquiniastrum bolivianum (Rusby) G.Sancho
- Moquiniastrum cinereum (Hook. & Arn.) G.Sancho
- Moquiniastrum cordatum (Less.) G.Sancho
- Moquiniastrum densicephalum (Cabrera) G.Sancho
- Moquiniastrum discolor (Baker) G.Sancho
- Moquiniastrum floribundum (Cabrera) G.Sancho
- Moquiniastrum gardneri (Baker) G.Sancho
- Moquiniastrum glabrum Roque, Neves & A.M.Teles
- Moquiniastrum hatschbachii (Cabrera) G.Sancho
- Moquiniastrum haumanianum (Cabrera) G.Sancho
- Moquiniastrum mollissimum (Malme) G.Sancho
- Moquiniastrum oligocephalum (Gardner) G.Sancho
- Moquiniastrum paniculatum (Less.) G.Sancho
- Moquiniastrum polymorphum (Less.) G.Sancho
- Moquiniastrum pulchrum (Cabrera) G.Sancho
- Moquiniastrum ramboi (Cabrera) G.Sancho
- Moquiniastrum sordidum (Less.) G.Sancho
- Moquiniastrum velutinum (Bong.) G.Sancho
