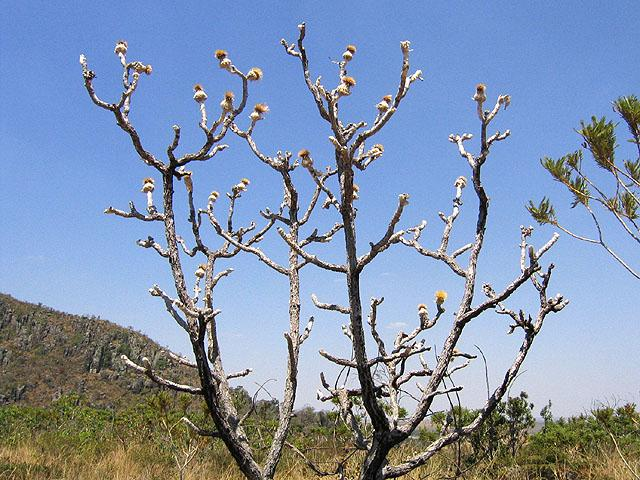

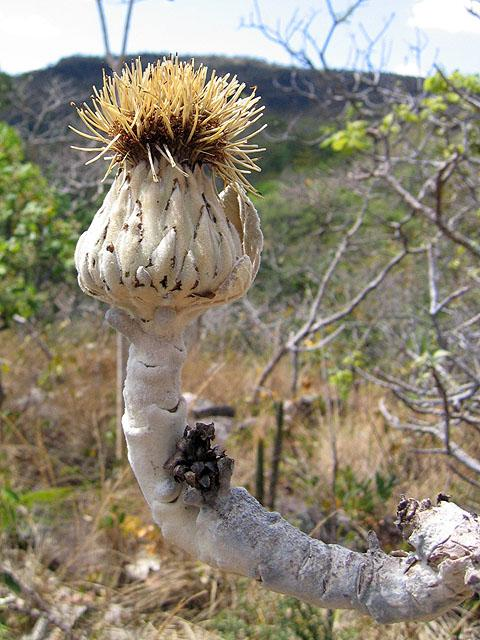

Scientific classification
- Kingdom: Plantae
- Clade: Tracheophytes
- Clade: Angiosperms
- Clade: Eudicots
- Clade: Asterids
- Order: Asterales
- Family: Asteraceae
- Genus: Wunderlichia
- Species: W. mirabilis

Binomial name
- Wunderlichia mirabilis Riedel ex Baker

= Wunderlichia mirabilis =

Species of flowering plant

Wunderlichia mirabilis is a plant species endemic to the highlands of east-central Brazil. It is known from the states of Espírito Santo, Minas Gerais, Goias, and São Paulo.

W. mirabilis is a branching tree up to 5 m tall. Leaves are broadly ovate to lanceolate, thick, and leathery. Flower heads have a large urn-shaped receptacle with whitish, tomentose phyllaries tapering toward the tip. Flowers are wind-pollinated.
