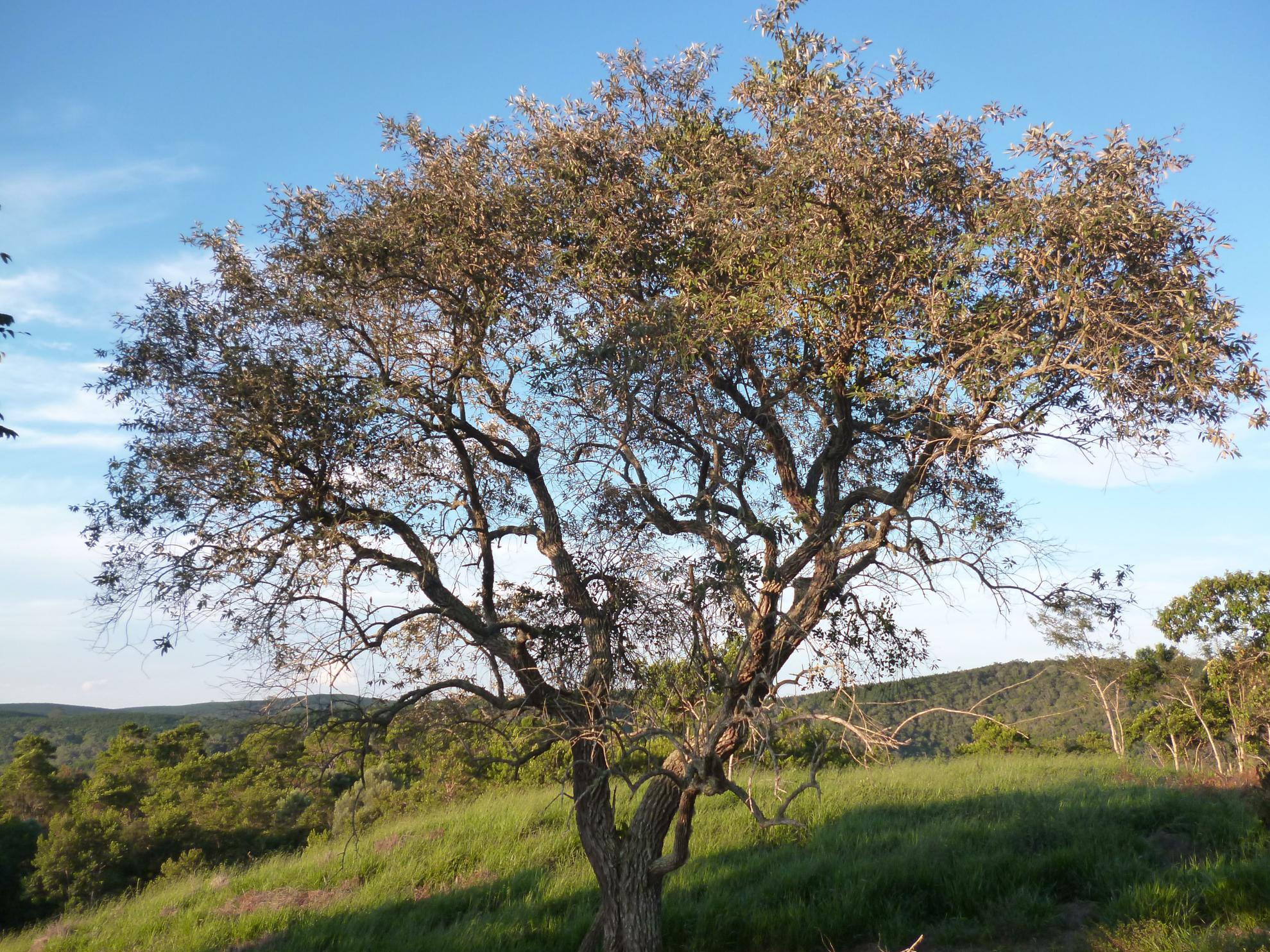

Scientific classification
- Kingdom: Plantae
- Clade: Tracheophytes
- Clade: Angiosperms
- Clade: Eudicots
- Clade: Asterids
- Order: Asterales
- Family: Asteraceae
- Genus: Moquiniastrum
- Species: M. polymorphum

Binomial name
- Moquiniastrum polymorphum (Less.) G.Sancho (2013)

Subspecies
- Moquiniastrum polymorphum subsp. ceanothifolium (Less.) G.Sancho; Moquiniastrum polymorphum subsp. floccosum (Cabrera) G.Sancho; Moquiniastrum polymorphum subsp. polymorphum

Synonyms
- Gochnatia polymorpha (Less.) Cabrera (1950); Moquinia polymorpha (Less.) DC. (1838); Spadonia polymorpha Less. (1832)

= Moquiniastrum polymorphum =

Species of flowering plant

Moquiniastrum polymorphum, the candeia or cambará, is a South American tree species in the family Asteraceae. It is native to South America, ranging from northeastern to southern and west-central Brazil, and Paraguay, Uruguay, and northeastern Argentina.

== Subspecies ==
Three subspecies are accepted.

- Moquiniastrum polymorphum subsp. ceanothifolium (Less.) G.Sancho – northeastern Argentina, southern Brazil, Paraguay, and Uruguay
- Moquiniastrum polymorphum subsp. floccosum (Cabrera) G.Sancho – southern Brazil
- Moquiniastrum polymorphum subsp. polymorphum – northeastern Brazil to southern Brazil and Paraguay
