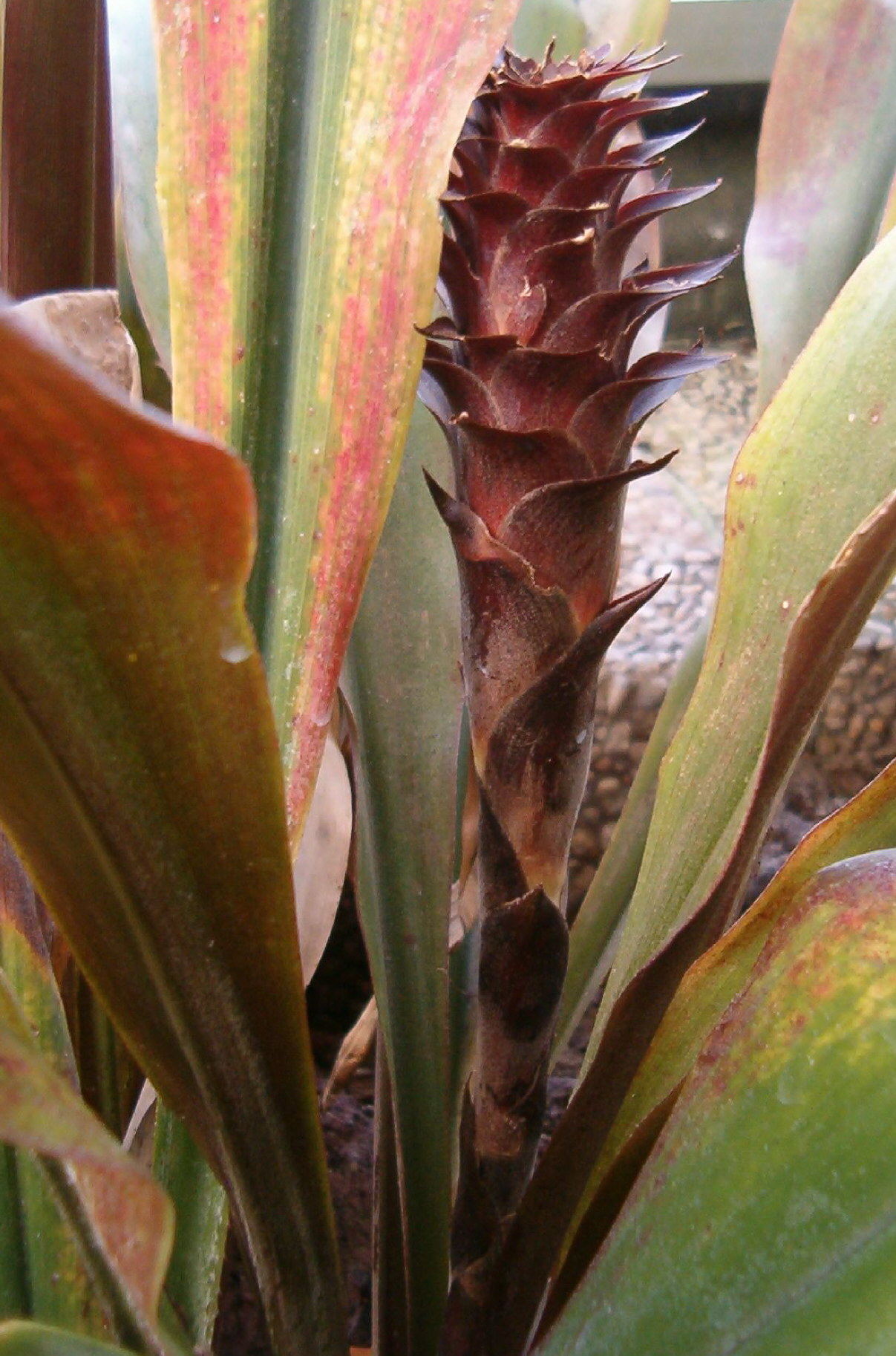

Scientific classification
- Kingdom: Plantae
- Clade: Tracheophytes
- Clade: Angiosperms
- Clade: Monocots
- Clade: Commelinids
- Order: Poales
- Family: Bromeliaceae
- Genus: Pitcairnia
- Species: P. atrorubens

Binomial name
- Pitcairnia atrorubens (Beer) Baker

Synonyms
- Phlomostachys atrorubens Beer; Neumannia atrorubens (Beer) K.Koch; Hepetis atrorubens (Beer) Mez; Lamproconus warszewiczii (H.Wendl. ex Hook.) Lem.; Puya warszewiczii H.Wendl. ex Hook.; Neumannia lindenii E.Morren ex Baker; Pitcairnia lamarcheana E.Morren ex Baker; Pitcairnia lindenii Baker; Hepetis atrorubens var. lamarcheana (E.Morren ex Baker) Mez; Hepetis lindenii (Baker) Mez; Pitcairnia atrorubens var. lamarcheana (E.Morren ex Baker) Mez; Pitcairnia atrorubens var. pallidobracteata Gross & Rauh

= Pitcairnia atrorubens =

Species of plant

Pitcairnia atrorubens is a species of flowering plant in Bromeliaceae family. It is native to Costa Rica, Panama, Honduras, Guatemala, Colombia, and western Mexico as far north as Nayarit.
