= Chimantaea =

Scientific classification
- Kingdom: Plantae
- Clade: Embryophytes
- Clade: Tracheophytes
- Clade: Spermatophytes
- Clade: Angiosperms
- Clade: Eudicots
- Clade: Asterids
- Order: Asterales
- Family: Asteraceae
- Subfamily: Wunderlichioideae
- Tribe: Wunderlichieae
- Genus: Chimantaea; Maguire, Steyerm. & Wurdack

Type species
- Chimantaea mirabilis Maguire, Steyerm. & Wurdack

Genus of flowering plants

Chimantaea is a genus of flowering plants in the family Asteraceae.

This genus is endemic to the Pantepui, a biogeographic province on the Guiana Highlands in Venezuela, Guyana, and Brazil. The region is characterized by a pattern of about 50 tepuis, isolated tabletop mountains that arise from the sandstone plateau of the highlands. Tepuis are known for their biodiversity, especially their concentrations of endemic species, and most are still pristine, undisturbed ecosystems. The genus is almost entirely restricted to the Chimantá Massif, a complex of several of these tepuis in Bolívar, Venezuela. There several species of the genus are dominant members of the higher-elevation shrublands, which are known as paramoid vegetation because of their similarity to the páramos of the Andes.

Species

All the species are endemic to Venezuela.

- Chimantaea acopanensis
- Chimantaea cinerea
- Chimantaea eriocephala
- Chimantaea espeletoidea
- Chimantaea huberi
- Chimantaea humilis
- Chimantaea lanocaulis
- Chimantaea mirabilis
- Chimantaea rupicola
