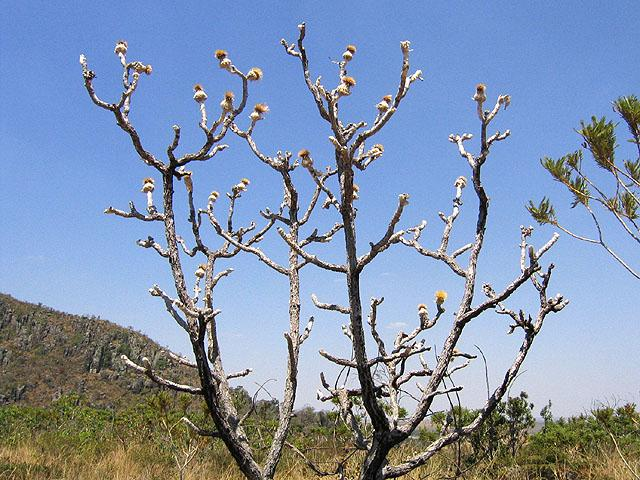
- Wunderlichia mirabilis
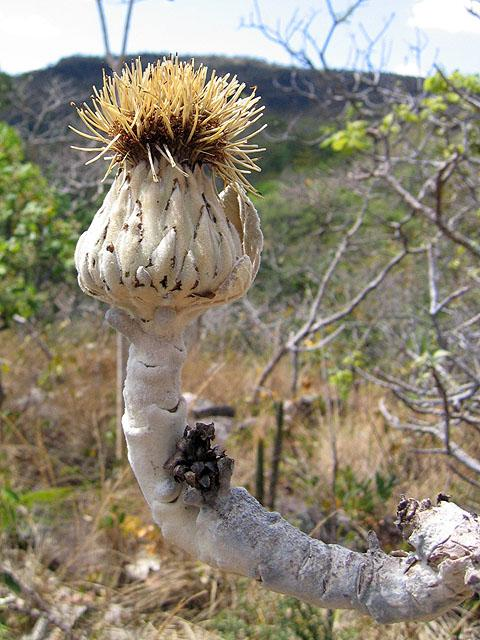

Scientific classification
- Kingdom: Plantae
- Clade: Tracheophytes
- Clade: Angiosperms
- Clade: Eudicots
- Clade: Asterids
- Order: Asterales
- Family: Asteraceae
- Tribe: Wunderlichieae
- Genus: Wunderlichia; Riedel ex Benth.

Type species
- Wunderlichia mirabilis Riedel ex J.G.Baker

= Wunderlichia =

Genus of trees

Wunderlichia is a genus of Brazilian trees in the family Asteraceae.

The genus contains several species of wind-pollinated trees, all endemic to Brazil.

Species

- Wunderlichia azulensis Maguire & G.M.Barroso - Espírito Santo, Minas Gerais
- Wunderlichia bahiensis Maguire & G.M.Barroso- Bahia
- Wunderlichia cruelsiana Taub. - Tocantins, Bahia, Goiás
- Wunderlichia insignis Baill. - Rio de Janeiro
- Wunderlichia mirabilis Riedel ex Baker - Espírito Santo, Minas Gerais, Bahia, São Paulo, D.F., Mato Grosso, Goiás
- Wunderlichia senaeii Glaz. ex Maguire & G.M.Barroso - Minas Gerais
