= Tehuasca =

Scientific classification
- Kingdom: Plantae
- Clade: Tracheophytes
- Clade: Angiosperms
- Clade: Eudicots
- Clade: Asterids
- Order: Asterales
- Family: Asteraceae
- Subfamily: Gochnatioideae
- Tribe: Gochnatieae
- Genus: Tehuasca; Panero
- Species: T. magna

Binomial name
- Tehuasca magna (M.C.Johnst.) Panero

Synonyms
- Gochnatia magna M.C.Johnst.; Nahuatlea magna (M.C.Johnst. ex Cabrera) V.A.Funk

Genus of flowering plants

Tehuasca is a genus of flowering plants in the family Asteraceae. It includes a single species, Tehuasca magna, a shrub or small tree native to eastern Mexico. it grows two to five meters tall with broadly ovate leaves, and is native to seasonally-dry xerophytic and moist forests.

The species was first described as Gochnatia magna by Marshall Conring Johnston in 1971. In 2019 José L. Panero placed it in the newly described monotypic genus Tehuasca.
