= Vickia =

Scientific classification
- Kingdom: Plantae
- Clade: Tracheophytes
- Clade: Angiosperms
- Clade: Eudicots
- Clade: Asterids
- Order: Asterales
- Family: Asteraceae
- Genus: Vickia; Roque & G.Sancho (2020)
- Species: V. rotundifolia

Binomial name
- Vickia rotundifolia (Less.) Roque & G.Sancho (2020)

Synonyms
- Gochnatia rotundifolia Less. (1832)

Genus of flowering plants

Vickia rotundifolia is a species of flowering plant in the sunflower family, Asteraceae. It is the sole species in genus Vickia. It is a subshrub or shrub native to the states of Rio de Janeiro, São Paulo, and Paraná in southeastern and southern Brazil.

Vickia is monoecious shrub growing 30 to 50 cm tall. It is native to the Cerrado ecoregion.

The species was first described as Gochnatia rotundifolia by Christian Friedrich Lessing in 1832. In 2020 Nadia Roque and Gisela Sancho placed it in the new monotypic genus Vickia as Vickia rotundifolia. The genus name honors Vicki Ann Funk, a Senior Research Botanist and Curator at the Smithsonian's National Museum of Natural History.
