= Jacques Cousteau Island =

Island in Baja California Sur, Mexico

Isla Jacques Cousteau Isla Cerralvo Jacques Cousteau Island Cerralvo Island
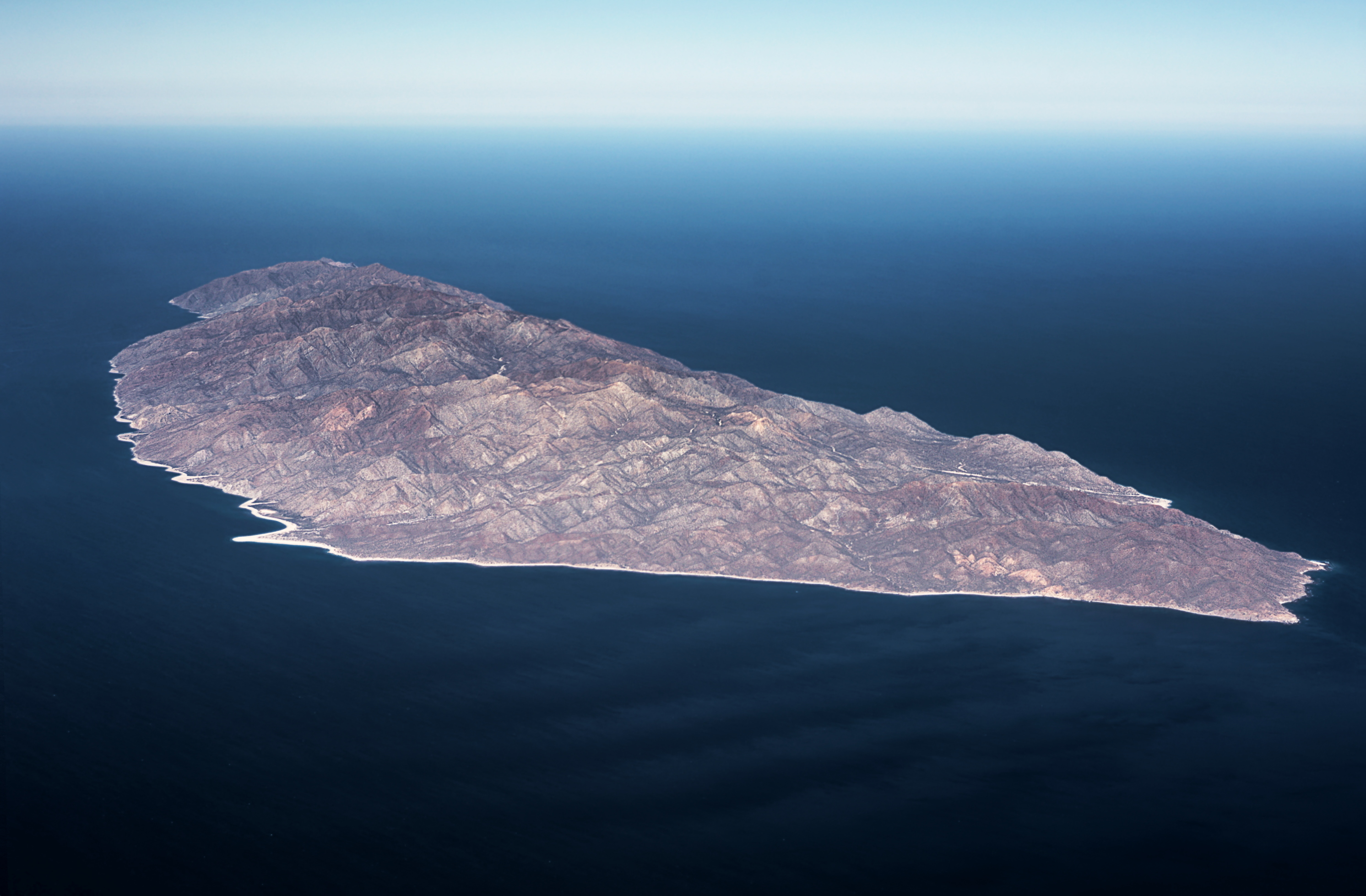
- Aerial view of Jacques Cousteau Island

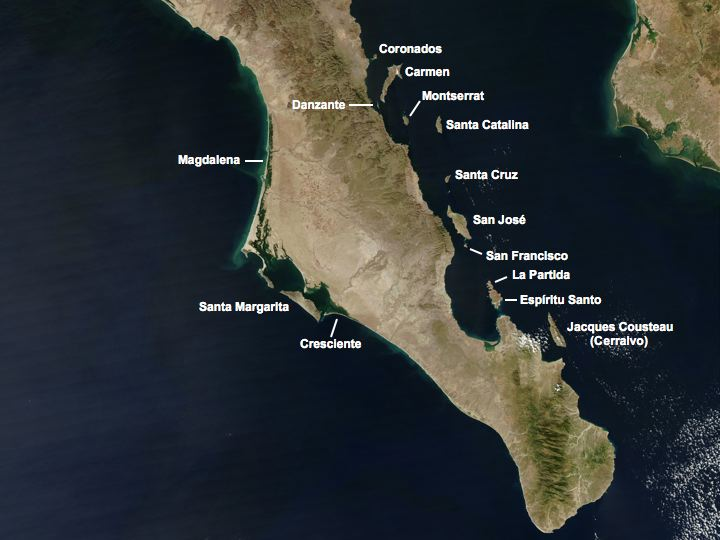

Geography
- Location: Gulf of California; Baja California Sur
- Coordinates: 24°13′17″N 109°52′14″W
- Area: 136 km^{2} (53 sq mi)

Administration
- Mexico

Demographics
- Population: Uninhabited

Isla Cerralvo (Spanish: [ˈisla seˈralβo]), as is commonly named, whose official name is Isla Jacques Cousteau (French: [ʒak kusto]; Spanish: [ʝak ˈkusto]), is an island located off the Cerralvo Canal coast near La Paz, Baja California Sur, Mexico.

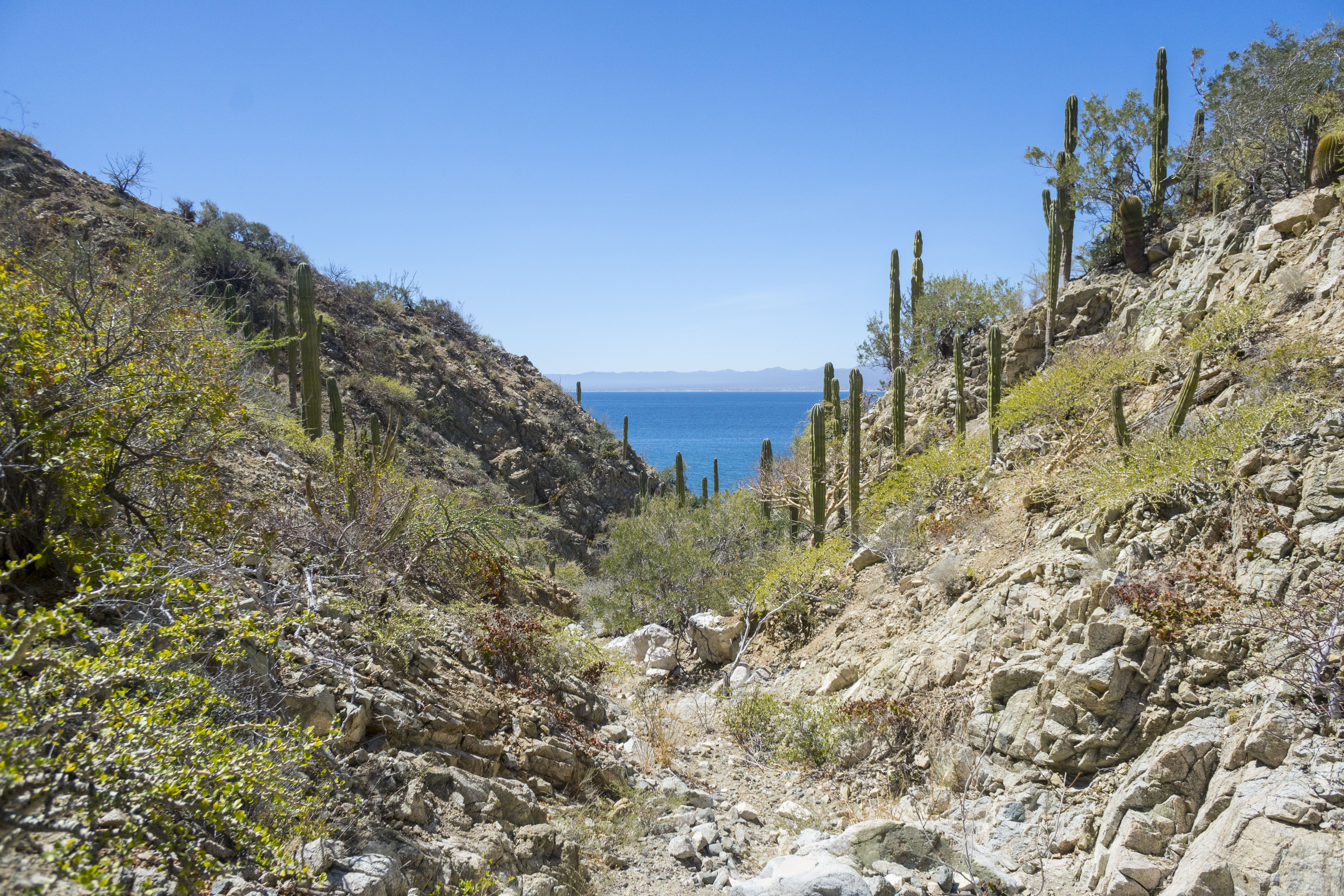
The landscape of the west coast of Cerralvo Island looking from a canyon towards La Ventana.

It is 18 miles (29 km) long with a land area of 136.498 square kilometres (52.702 sq mi), and is the ninth-largest island in Mexico. The island is adjacent to the towns of El Sargento and La Ventana and is part of Municipality of La Paz. The island peak comes to 2,100 ft (640 m) and the ridge line runs north–south with many small streams draining east to Gulf of California and west to Cupalo Canal. There are many steep bluffs on the eastern sides and many sandy beaches and points on the west side.

There is abundant marine life surrounding this island which are due to underwater topography and ocean currents and are the traditional fishing grounds of the local ejidos and is dotted with temporary fish camps. Virtually all local marine life must migrate past the island, and water visibility goes up to 30 meters, making it a prime location for big game fishing. There are abundant yellowtail, golden grouper, marlin, sailfish, swordfish or broadbill, other game, and bait fish in Cerralvo Canal waters.

The cactus species Cochemiea cerralboa is endemic to the island.

== Name change ==
On November 17, 2009, the Mexican government changed the island name from its historical name, "Isla Cerralvo", to "Isla Jacques Cousteau", in honor of French oceanographer Jacques-Yves Cousteau (1910–1997), who had led many expeditions in this area.

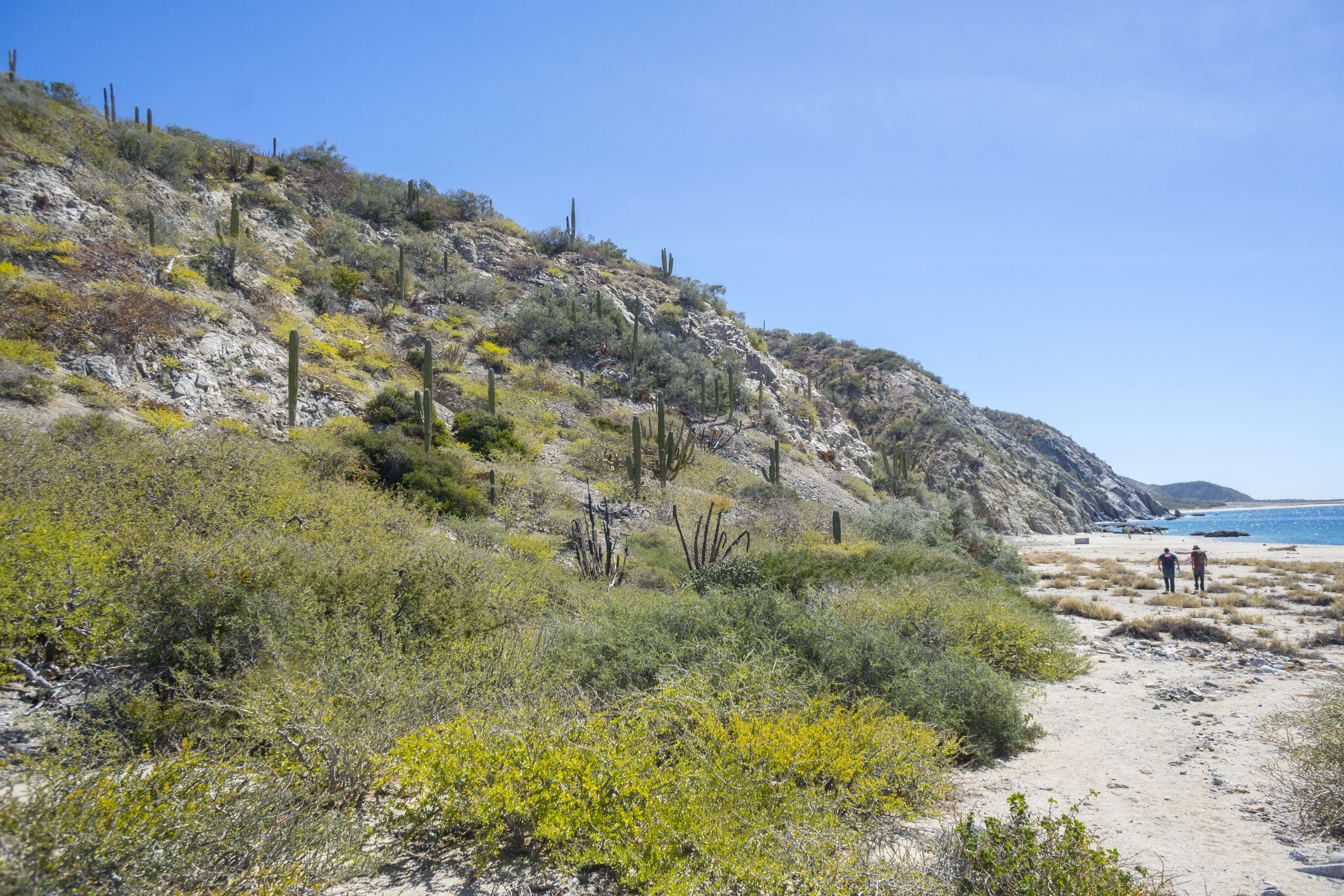
View from a beach on the west coast of Cerralvo.

This name change has generated annoyance and a growing resistance amongst citizens of nearby towns of El Sargento and La Ventana, in Baja California Sur state, who were not consulted; they insist on keeping the name "Isla Cerralvo". This resistance is also supported by many people in other Mexican regions.

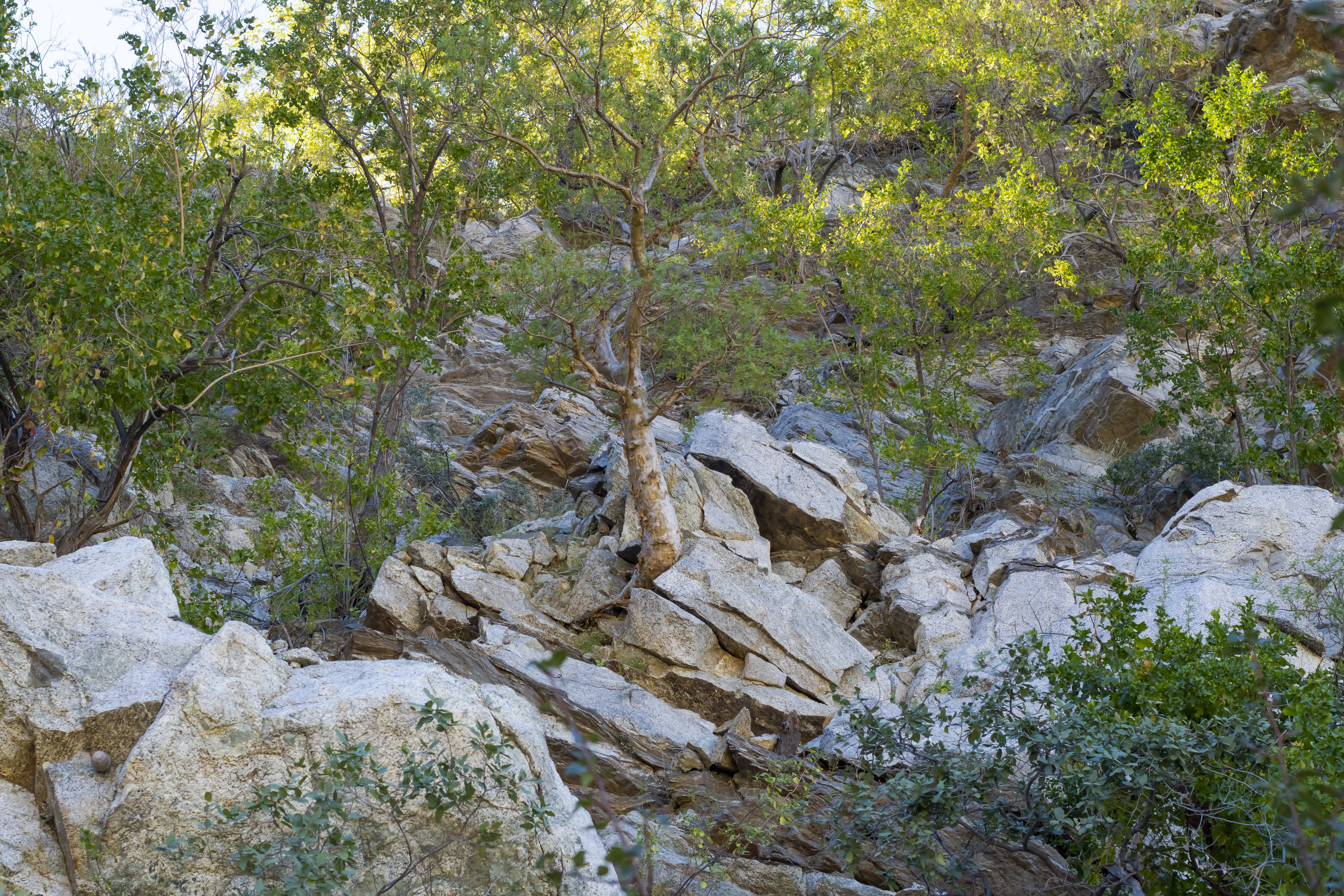
Pachycormus discolor growing on a shady granitic face on Cerralvo Island.

Mexican senators Luis Alberto Coppola Joffroy, Sebastian Calderón Centeno and Humberto Andrade Quezada, from Partido Acción Nacional (PAN) initiated a resolution to request different Mexican authorities to inform the decree where change of name was adopted.

Also senator Francisco Javier Obregón Espinoza has introduced a resolution in the Mexican Congress requesting the name change be reversed. Leading Mexican intellectuals such as Miguel León-Portilla (a former UNESCO director) have also voiced opposition to the name change.
