= Vicki Funk =

American botanist (1947–2019)

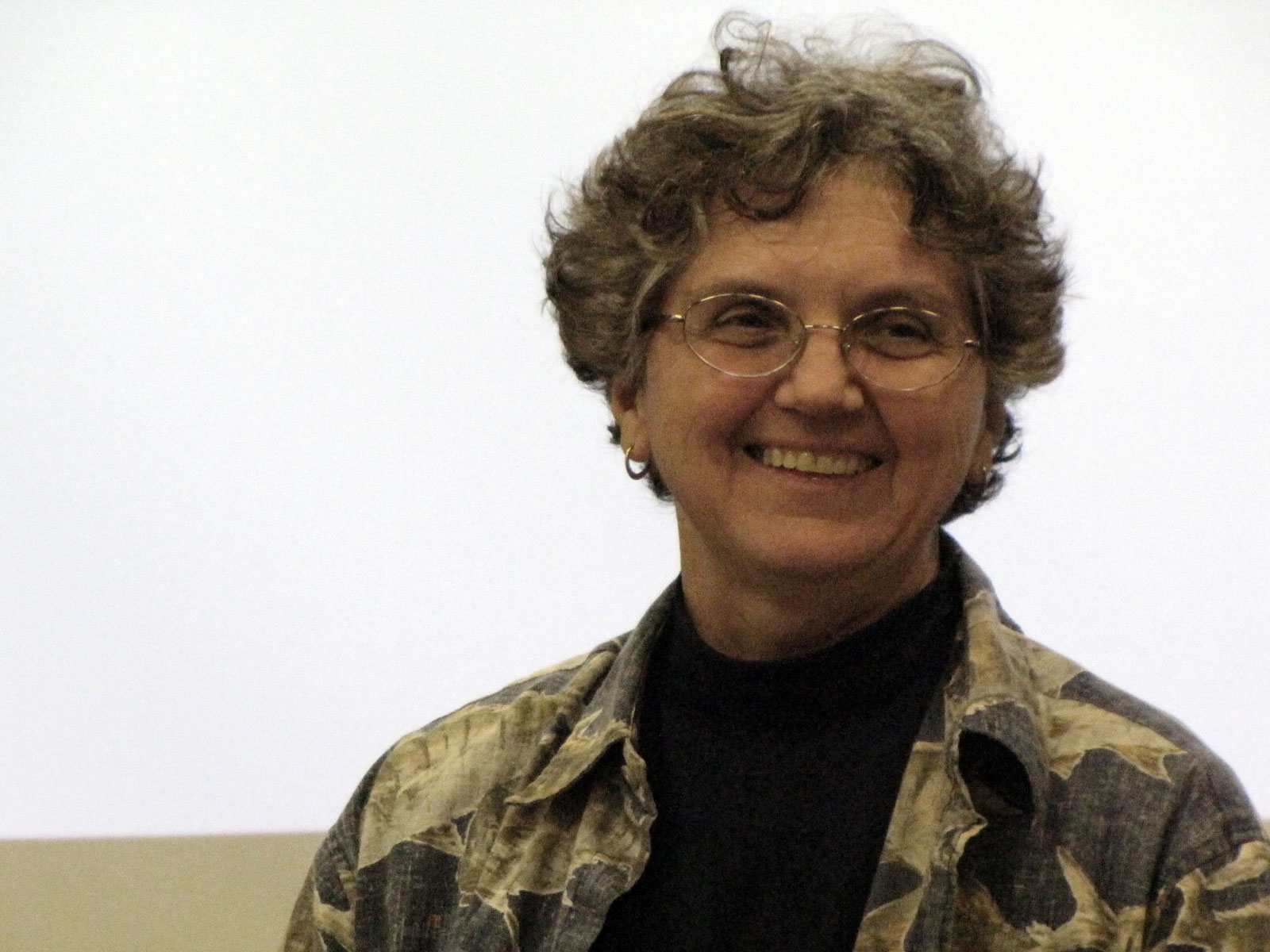
- Funk in 2010
- Born: Vicki Ann Funk; November 26, 1947; Owensboro, Kentucky, U.S.
- Died: October 22, 2019 (aged 71)
- Education: B.S., Murray State University, Biology and History, 1969, M.S., Murray State University, Biology, 1975; PhD, Ohio State University, 1980
- Known for: Botanist and curator
- Awards: Queensland Fellowship (2001); Society of Systematic Biologists President’s Award for Service (2002); National Museum of Natural History Science Achievement Award (2006); National Museum of Natural History Science Achievement Award (2009); Secretary's Award for Excellence in Collaboration (2009); International Association for Plant Taxonomy Stebbins' Medal (2010); Smithsonian's Secretary's Award for Outstanding Publication (2012); Rolf Dahlgren Prize (2014); American Society of Plant Taxonomists Asa Gray Lifetime Achievement Award (2018); Linnean Medal (2019)
- Scientific career
- Workplaces: New York Botanical Garden, Smithsonian Institution, George Mason University, Duke University
- Theses: A Floristic and Geologic Survey of Selected Seeps of Calloway County, KY.; The Systematics of Montanoa Cerv. (Asteraceae)
- Author abbrev. (botany): V.A.Funk

Vicki Ann Funk (November 26, 1947 – October 22, 2019) was an American botanist and curator at the Smithsonian's National Museum of Natural History, known for her work on members of the composite family (Asteraceae) including collecting plants in many parts of the world, as well as her synthetic work on phylogenetics and biogeography.

== Biography ==
Funk was born on November 26, 1947, in Owensboro, Kentucky, to Edwin Joseph and Betty Ann (née Massenburg) Funk. She had two brothers, Edwin Jr. and Jared Kirk. She grew up in Owensboro and at a few United States Air Force bases before she was in elementary school. Funk studied biology and history at Murray State University in Kentucky and received a Bachelor of Science (BS) degree in 1969. She had wanted to attend medical school, but decided against it after volunteering at a hospital one summer. After graduating, she lived and worked part-time in Germany for two years, then returned to the United States to teach high school for one year. She then spent a summer at the Hancock Biological Station on Kentucky Lake. There she discovered her passion for field work and research.

In 1975, she received an M.S. in biology at Murray State where her thesis was A Floristic and Geologic Survey of Selected Seeps of Calloway County, KY. Her advisor was Dr. Marian Fuller. She spent the summer of 1975 studying aquatic plants at Stone Lab at Lake Erie. In the fall she began doctoral studies at Ohio State University with Ron Stuckey as her advisor. She later changed her focus to Compositae with Tod Stuessy. She was an assistant curator at the Ohio State University from 1976 until 1977. In 1980, she graduated from the Ohio State University with a Ph.D., writing her thesis on The Systematics of Montanoa Cerv. (Asteraceae), which was published in 1982 in the Memoirs of the New York Botanical Garden. In 1981, she spent a postdoctoral year at the New York Botanical Garden where she studied Compositae with Arthur Cronquist and the newly developing field of phylogenetics at the American Museum of Natural History.

Funk was appointed as a research scientist and curator at the U.S. National Herbarium of the Smithsonian Institution's National Museum of Natural History in 1981. In 1986, she published A Phylogenetic analysis of the Orchidaceae (Smithsonian Institution Press) with Dr. Pamela Burns-Balogh. In 2004, she became a senior research scientist and curator of compositae at the U.S. National Herbarium Department of Botany.

Funk's research included detailing evolutionary relationships and biogeography using plant DNA. She co-discovered the critically endangered Bidens meyeri in Rapa Iti, French Polynesia. Her work shows that this Bidens species may represent the end of a migration from North America through the Society Islands to the Austral Islands.

Beginning in 1988, she served as head of the Biological Diversity of the Guiana Shield Program (BDG), and in 2015 began the Global Genome Initiative for Gardens, both headquartered at the Smithsonian Institution. Both of these programs were passed on to others in 2018. She was also an adjunct professor at George Mason University and Duke University.

Funk was a member of a number of societies and served in a position for many. She was the president of the Society of Systematic Biologists (1998–1999), American Society of Plant Taxonomists (2006–2007), International Biogeography Society (2007–2009), Botanical Society of Washington (2014), and International Association of Plant Taxonomists (2011–2017). She was in many other positions in these societies and others.

== Awards and honors ==
In 2001, the government of Queensland awarded Funk a Queensland Research Fellowship. In 2009, she received two awards: the Secretary's Award for Excellence in Collaboration and the National Museum of Natural History Science Achievement Award. In 2010, she was awarded the Stebbins' Medal for the best publication in Plant Systematics or Plant Evolution in the period 2007 to 2009 from the International Association for Plant Taxonomy. In 2012, she won the Smithsonian's Secretary's Award for Outstanding Publication and became a board member for the National Evolutionary Synthesis Center for two years. In 2014 she won the Rolf Dahlgren Prize for her major contributions to the understanding of the systematics and evolution of the angiosperms.

Funk has also been recognized for lifetime achievements in her field. In 2018, she won the Asa Gray Lifetime Achievement Award from the American Society of Plant Taxonomists. In 2019, the Linnean Society of London recognized Funk with its Linnean Medal for lifetime service to the natural sciences. In 2019, the American Society of Plant Taxonomists announced the new Vicki Funk Fund for Graduate Student Research in her honor.

In 2005, scientists named a new species of ant after Vicki Funk. This species, Pheidole funki, is known only from a single specimen collected in Guyana. Three genera, namely Vickia, Vickifunkia and Vickianthus, are named in honor of Vicki Funk's contribution towards systematics of Compositae. The species Xenophyllum funkianum J. Calvo from the Ecuadorian Andes was named after her in 2020 in a posthumous co-publication. Baccharis funkiae, a narrow endemic species of Compositae from Uruguay is named after Vicki Funk. Indian botanists named a new species of Gesneriaceae as Didymocarpus vickifunkiae to honor her contributions.

In November 2020, the Journal of Systematics and Evolution dedicated a special issue on collection-based systematics and biogeography as a tribute to Vicki Funk.

== Bibliography ==
The standard author abbreviation V.A. Funk is used to indicate this person as the author when citing a botanical name.

- Funk, Vicki (2004). "100 Uses for an Herbarium (Well at Least 72)" (PDF). Division of Botany, The Yale University Herbarium.
- "An opinion: Down with Alphabetically Arranged Herbaria (and alphabetically arranged floras too for that matter)" (PDF). Plant Science Bulletin Volume 49 Issue 4.

== Select publications ==
She was the author or co-author of over 280 publications.

Top five cited papers:

- EO Wiley, D Siegel-Causey, DR Brooks, VA Funk. 1991. "The compleat cladist: A primer of phylogeny procedures". https://repository.si.edu/bitstream/handle/10088/11369/bot_1991_pr_Wiley_etal._CompleatCladist.pdf.
- WL Wagner, VA Funk. 1995. "Hawaiian biogeography". Smithsonian Institution Press.https://www.biodiversitylibrary.org/item/224621#page/7/mode/1up
- VA Funk, R Bayer, S Keeley, R Chan, L Watson, B Gemeinholzer, E Schilling, J Panero, B Baldwin, NT Garcia-Jacas, A Susanna, RK Jansen. 2005. "Everywhere but Antarctica: Using a supertree to understand the diversity and distribution of the Compositae". In Proceedings of a Symposium on Plant Diversity and Complexity Patterns - Local, Regional and Global Dimensions. I Friis and H Balslev (eds.). The Royal Danish Academy of Sciences and Letters, Copenhagen. Biologiske Skrifter 55: 343–374. https://repository.si.edu/bitstream/handle/10088/11397/bot_2005_pr_Funk_etal_Supertree.pdf.
- JL Panero, VA Funk. 2008. "The value of sampling anomalous taxa in phylogenetic studies: major clades of the Asteraceae revealed". Molecular Phylogenetics and Evolution 47 (2), 757-782. https://repository.si.edu/bitstream/handle/10088/11405/bot_2008_pr_Panero_Funk_Base_tree.pdf
- VA Funk, A Susanna, T Stuessy, R Bayer. 2009. "Systematics, evolution, and biogeography of Compositae". International Association for Plant Taxonomy.

Top five cited papers in the last five years (2013 – August 2018):

- JR Mandel, RB Dikow, VA Funk, RR Masalia, SE Staton, A Kozik, RW Michelmore, LH Rieseberg, JM Burke. 2014. "A target enrichment method for gathering phylogenetic information from hundreds of loci: an example from the Compositae". Applications in Plant Sciences 2 (2), 1300085. https://onlinelibrary.wiley.com/doi/pdf/10.3732/apps.1300085
- J Wen, SM Ickert‐Bond, MS Appelhans, LJ Dorr, VA Funk. 2015. "Collections‐based systematics: Opportunities and outlook for 2050". Journal of Systematics and Evolution 53 (6), 477–488. https://onlinelibrary.wiley.com/doi/full/10.1111/jse.12181
- J Wen, RH Ree, SM Ickert-Bond, Z Nie, V Funk. 2013. "Biogeography: where do we go from here?". Taxon 62 (5), 912–927. https://www.ingentaconnect.com/contentone/iapt/tax/2013/00000062/00000005/art00007?crawler=true
- JR Mandel, RB Dikow, VA Funk. 2015. "Using phylogenomics to resolve mega‐families: An example from Compositae". Journal of Systematics and Evolution 53 (5), 391–402. https://onlinelibrary.wiley.com/doi/pdf/10.1111/jse.12167
- ZL Nie, V Funk, H Sun, T Deng, Y Meng, J Wen. 2013. "Molecular phylogeny of Anaphalis (Asteraceae, Gnaphalieae) with biogeographic implications in the Northern Hemisphere". Journal of Plant Research 126 (1), 17–32. https://link.springer.com/article/10.1007/s10265-012-0506-6
