= Piezocerini =

Scientific classification
- Domain: Eukaryota
- Kingdom: Animalia
- Phylum: Arthropoda
- Class: Insecta
- Order: Coleoptera
- Suborder: Polyphaga
- Infraorder: Cucujiformia
- Family: Cerambycidae
- Subfamily: Cerambycinae
- Tribe: Piezocerini

Tribe of beetles

Piezocerini is a tribe of beetles in the subfamily Cerambycinae, containing the following genera:

- Acruspex
- Alienosternus
- Cicatrizocera
- Colynthaea
- Gorybia
- Haruspex
- Hemilissa
- Migmocera
- Migorybia
- Othnocerus
- Pharcidodes
- Piezarina
- Piezasteria
- Piezocera
- Piezogenista
- Piezosecus
- Pseudocolynthaea
- Thyellocerus
- Zelliboria
