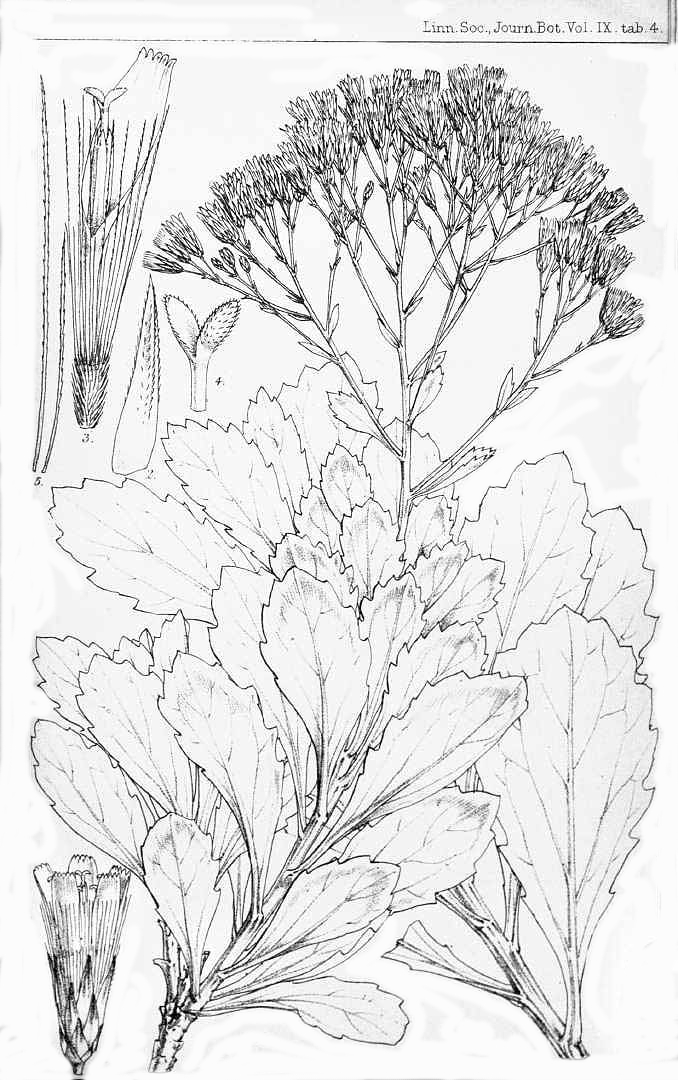

Scientific classification
- Kingdom: Plantae
- Clade: Tracheophytes
- Clade: Angiosperms
- Clade: Eudicots
- Clade: Asterids
- Order: Asterales
- Family: Asteraceae
- Subfamily: Pertyoideae
- Tribe: Pertyeae
- Genus: Catamixis; Thomson
- Species: C. baccharoides

Binomial name
- Catamixis baccharoides Thomson

Synonyms
- Baccharis oligantha DC. ex Thomson

= Catamixis =

Genus of flowering plants

Catamixis is a genus assigned to the family Asteraceae, with only one known species, Catamixis baccharoides, a low to medium height shrub. It is native to a very small area of western Nepal and northern India in the Himalayas. It has spoon-shaped, leathery leaves with rounded teeth, set alternately along straight, shyly branching stems. They carry many flower heads about 1 cm (0.4 in) long, with a few creamy white florets, sometimes with a hint of violet, in corymbs at the end of the branches. Flowers and fruits can be found between March and May. Its vernacular name in Hindi is विषपत्री (vishpatri) or विश्पत्र (vishpatra).

== Description ==
Catamixis baccharoides is a shrub 0.75–1.75 m (2 ft 6 in – 5 ft 9 in) high, with straight, shyly branching stems, which are circular in cross-section, initially covered in silky hairs pressed to the surface, but later becoming hairless, carrying alternately set leaves close together, which leave distinct marks after being shed. The leaves are leathery and hairless, up to 8 cm (3.1 in) long and 3.5 cm (1.4 in) wide, spoon-shaped, the base tapering into the stalk, while the margin is somewhat wavy, with distanced rounded teeth particularly in the upper half. The flower heads are set in corymbs at the end of the branches or in the leaf axils. Each flower head consists of an involucre, 5–6 mm (0.20–0.24 in) high, with several whorls of lanceolate bracts narrowing into the tip, with papery edges, and contains mostly five, sometimes four or six, hermaphrodite creamy white ligulate florets 3.7 cm (1.5 in) long, ending in five shallow, but irregular lobes. Each of the five individual anthers per floret has two spurs at its base, giving them an arrow-shaped foot. Like in all Asteraceae, the pinkish anthers are fused into a tube through which the style grows, while picking up the pollen that is released at the inside of the tube. The shaft of the style only has few hairs at its base. When ripe, the style opens into two branches about 0.5 mm (0.02 in) long with short stigmatic papillae at the dorsal side. There are no bracts on the common base of the florets. The indehiscent one-seeded fruits (called cypselas) are 2 mm (0.08 in) long, covered in velvety hairs, and are adorned by ten longitudinal ribs. The sepals which are changed to barbed 8 mm (0.31 in) long hairs called pappus are white in color. The pollen is tricolpate and has some small spines of less than 1 μm (3.9×10^{−5} in) high.

=== Common characters with other less related Asteraceae ===
The flower heads of Catamixis contain florets with ligulate corollas only, a trait shared with the Lactuceae, but also with Fitchia, Hyaloseris, Dinoseris and Glossarion.

== Taxonomy ==
Catamixis baccharoides was described by Thomas Thomson in 1867, who thought it was most closely related to Leucomeris, a genus that is now assigned to the subfamily Wunderlichioideae, tribe Hyalideae. It has been difficult to establish the relationships of Catamixis with other asterids, since no substantial analysis of its genetic material has been published so far. Because it shares the combination of ligulate florets, spurred anthers, and involucres that consist of several whorls of overlapping bracts, the species was initially assigned to the tribe Mutisieae sensu lato, but genetic analysis has since shown that this grouping constitutes a basal evolutionary grade, which has been consequently divided into nine subfamilies. However, further characters of Catamixis are shared with different of these subfamilies or the subdivisions they include, but always elements of the unique character combinations of these subfamilies are lacking in Catamixis. More recently, Catamixis was assumed to be associated with the tribe Pertyeae. Catamixis lacks a deletion of 17 base pairs close to one of the chloroplast NADH dehydrogenase genes, that is a common character for members of the subfamilies Gymnarrhenoideae, Cichorioideae, Corymbioideae and Asteroideae. Catamixis, Pertya, Myripnois and two of the Ainsliaea-species share a deletion of 145 base pairs not found in any lineage except Pertyoideae. A point mutation in the maturase K gene is shared with the genera Ainsliaea and Pertya, which belong to the Pertyoideae. This makes it very likely that Catamixis should be included in the Pertyoideae, but does not fully resolve the position within that subfamily.

=== Etymology ===
The name Catamixis is a contraction of the Greek words κατά (kata) and μιξη (mixi), meaning “mixed affinity”, which refers to the combination of characters that makes it difficult to assign it based on morphology within the Asteraceae.

== Distribution and habitat ==
This is a narrow range, endemic, monotypic genus distributed in lower Shiwalik belt of Western Himalaya from an altitude range of 500–1,000 m (1,600–3,300 ft). The species is reported from few localities in India from Haryana, Himachal Pradesh, Uttarakhand and Uttar Pradesh and one from West Nepal. The species is habitat specific and grows on exposed, dry, sandstone or calcareous rocky cliffs of lower Shiwalik belt.

== Conservation ==
Since the species is threatened, a number of efforts were carried out for its conservation under ex-situ conservation. This habitat-specific species is also propagated and cultivated in the botanical garden of Botanical Survey of India, Dehradun in an artificially created rocky mound and is also planted in the experimental garden of Forest Research Institute, Dehradun.
