= Gymnelia xanthogastra =

Scientific classification
- Kingdom: Animalia
- Phylum: Arthropoda
- Clade: Pancrustacea
- Class: Insecta
- Order: Lepidoptera
- Superfamily: Noctuoidea
- Family: Erebidae
- Subfamily: Arctiinae
- Genus: Gymnelia
- Species: G. xanthogastra

Binomial name
- Gymnelia xanthogastra (Perty, 1834)

Synonyms
- Glaucopis xanthogastra Perty, 1834

Species of moth

Gymnelia xanthogastra is a moth of the subfamily Arctiinae. It was described by Maximilian Perty in 1834. It is found in Rio de Janeiro, Brazil.
