= Leucomeris =

Scientific classification
- Kingdom: Plantae
- Clade: Tracheophytes
- Clade: Angiosperms
- Clade: Eudicots
- Clade: Asterids
- Order: Asterales
- Family: Asteraceae
- Subfamily: Wunderlichioideae
- Tribe: Hyalideae
- Genus: Leucomeris; D.Don

Synonyms
- Gochnatia subg. Leucomeris (D.Don) Less.; Gochnatia sect. Leucomeris (D.Don) Cabrera; Nouelia Franch.

Genus of flowering plants

Leucomeris is a genus of Asian flowering plant in the family Asteraceae. It includes three species native to the Indian Subcontinent, Indochina, and south-central China.

== Species ==
Three species are accepted.

- Leucomeris decora Kurz – Manipur, Mizoram, Myanmar, Yunnan, Guizhou, Thailand, and Vietnam
- Leucomeris insignis (Franch.) Su Liu & Z.H.Feng – southwestern Sichuan and Yunnan
- Leucomeris spectabilis D.Don – Nepal, Uttar Pradesh, and Uttarakhand

formerly included

see Pertya Vernonia

- Leucomeris celebica (Blume) Blume ex DC.- Vernonia arborea Buch.-Ham.
- Leucomeris glabra Blume ex DC. - Vernonia arborea Buch.-Ham.
- Leucomeris javanica Blume ex DC. - Vernonia arborea Buch.-Ham.
- Leucomeris scandens (Thunb. ex Murray) Sch.Bip. - Pertya scandens (Thunb. ex Thunb.) Sch.Bip.
