= Leucomeris insignis =

Conservation status
- Near Threatened (IUCN 2.3)

Scientific classification
- Kingdom: Plantae
- Clade: Tracheophytes
- Clade: Angiosperms
- Clade: Eudicots
- Clade: Asterids
- Order: Asterales
- Family: Asteraceae
- Subfamily: Wunderlichioideae
- Tribe: Hyalideae
- Genus: Leucomeris
- Species: L. insignis

Binomial name
- Leucomeris insignis (Franch.) Su Liu & Z.H.Feng

Synonyms
- Nouelia insignis Franch.

Genus of flowering plants

Leucomeris insignis is a species of flowering plant in the family Asteraceae. It is a shrub or small tree native to Yunnan and southwestern Sichuan provinces of south-central China. where it is found in the lower reaches of the Anning and Yalong rivers and Jinsha River valley. Plants grow singly or in small clumps from 900 to 2,800 meters elevation, often rock crevices and on steep cliffs. The species threatened by habitat loss and over-collection for firewood.

The species was first described as Nouelia insignis by Adrien René Franchet in 1888, and placed in the monotypic genus Nouelia. A 2018 phylogenetic study found that the species was closely related to Leucomeris decora, and in 2024 Zhen-Hao Feng et al. placed the species in genus Leucomeris as Leucomeris insignis.
