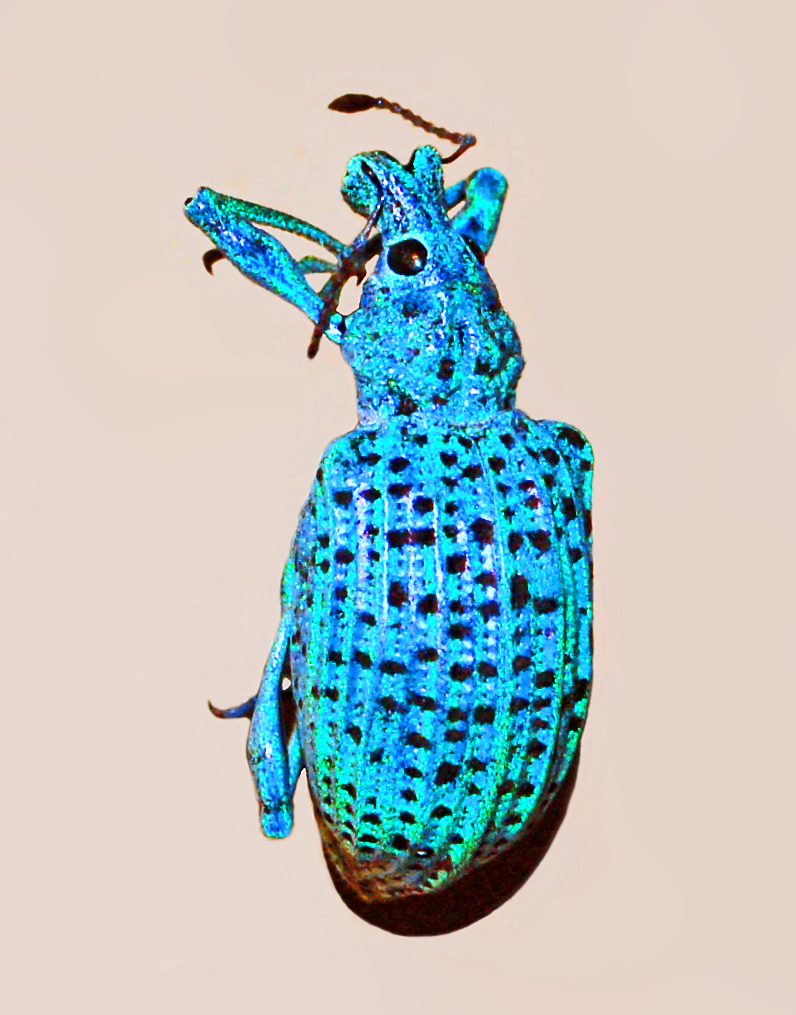
- Rhigus nigrosparsus from Brazil

Scientific classification
- Kingdom: Animalia
- Phylum: Arthropoda
- Clade: Pancrustacea
- Class: Insecta
- Order: Coleoptera
- Suborder: Polyphaga
- Infraorder: Cucujiformia
- Superfamily: Curculionoidea
- Family: Curculionidae
- Genus: Rhigus
- Species: R. nigrosparsus

Binomial name
- Rhigus nigrosparsus Perty, M., 1830-34

Synonyms
- Rhigus nigrosparsus (Perty 1832); Rhigus nigrosparsus (Perty, 1830)

= Rhigus nigrosparsus =

Species of beetle

Rhigus nigrosparsus is a species of weevil in the family Curculionidae. This species can be found in Brazil and Paraguay.
