= Gymnelia =

Scientific classification
- Kingdom: Animalia
- Phylum: Arthropoda
- Class: Insecta
- Order: Lepidoptera
- Superfamily: Noctuoidea
- Family: Erebidae
- Subfamily: Arctiinae
- Subtribe: Euchromiina
- Genus: Gymnelia; Walker, 1854

Synonyms
- Andrenimorpha Butler, 1876; Enioche Druce, 1896; Sansaptera Schaus, 1896

Genus of moths

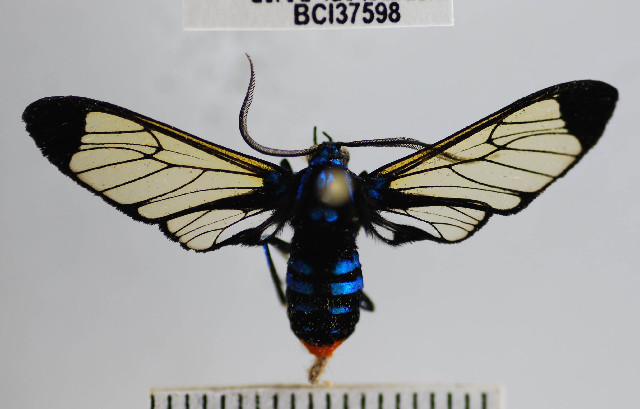
Gymnelia salvini

Gymnelia is a genus of moths in the subfamily Arctiinae. The genus was erected by Francis Walker in 1854.

== Species ==
- Gymnelia abdominalis Rothschild, 1931
- Gymnelia baroni Rothschild, 1910
- Gymnelia bricenoi (Rothschild, 1911)
- Gymnelia buckleyi (Druce, 1883)
- Gymnelia carabayana (Rothschild, 1911)
- Gymnelia cennocha Schaus, 1924
- Gymnelia colona (Schaus, 1911)
- Gymnelia doncasteri Rothschild, 1911
- Gymnelia dubium (Rothschild, 1911)
- Gymnelia ducei Schaus, 1924
- Gymnelia ethodaea (Druce, 1889)
- Gymnelia felderi Rothschild, 1931
- Gymnelia flavicapilla Rothschild, 1931
- Gymnelia gemmifera (Walker, 1854)
- Gymnelia guapila Schaus, 1911
- Gymnelia hampsoni (Klages, 1906)
- Gymnelia herodes (Druce, 1883)
- Gymnelia hyaloxantha Dognin, 1914
- Gymnelia ichneumonoides (Rothschild, 1911)
- Gymnelia jordani Zerny, 1912
- Gymnelia latimarginata Hampson, 1898
- Gymnelia lucens (Dognin, 1902)
- Gymnelia ludga Schaus, 1924
- Gymnelia lyrcea (Druce, 1883)
- Gymnelia metallicum (Rothschild, 1911)
- Gymnelia nobilis (Schaus, 1911)
- Gymnelia paranapanema Dognin, 1911
- Gymnelia pavo (Hampson, 1914)
- Gymnelia peculiaris Rothschild, 1931
- Gymnelia peratea Dognin, 1910
- Gymnelia perniciosa Dognin, 1923
- Gymnelia pitthea (Druce, 1896)
- Gymnelia sephela (Druce, 1883)
- Gymnelia semicincta Kaye, 1910
- Gymnelia simillimum (Rothschild, 1911)
- Gymnelia steinbachi Rothschild, 1911
- Gymnelia stuarti (Rothschild, 1911)
- Gymnelia taos Hampson, 1898
- Gymnelia torquatus Druce, 1883
- Gymnelia villia (Druce, 1906)
- Gymnelia viridicingulatum (Rothschild, 1911)
- Gymnelia xanthogastra (Perty, 1834)
- Gymnelia zelosa Dognin, 1899

== Former species ==
- Gymnelia cocho (Schaus, 1896)
