= Mallodeta =

Scientific classification
- Kingdom: Animalia
- Phylum: Arthropoda
- Class: Insecta
- Order: Lepidoptera
- Superfamily: Noctuoidea
- Family: Erebidae
- Subfamily: Arctiinae
- Genus: Mallodeta; Butler, 1876
- Species: M. clavata

Binomial name
- Mallodeta clavata (Walker, 1854)

Synonyms
- Generic; Lycorea Walker, 1854 (preocc. Doubleday, 1847); Specific; Glaucopis clavata Walker, 1854; Mallodeta simplex Rothschild, 1931

Genus of moths

Mallodeta is a monotypic moth genus in the family Erebidae described by Arthur Gardiner Butler in 1876. Its single species, Mallodeta clavata, was described by Francis Walker in 1854. It is found in Brazil and Paraguay.

== Former species ==
- Mallodeta cubana Gaede, 1926 now Phoenicoprocta capistrata (Fabricius, 1775)
- Mallodeta partheni (Fabricius, 1793) now Phoenicoprocta partheni (Fabricius, 1793)
- Mallodeta consors Walker, 1854 now Erruca consors (Walker, 1854)
- Mallodeta sanguipuncta Druce, 1898 now Erruca sanguipuncta Druce, 1898
