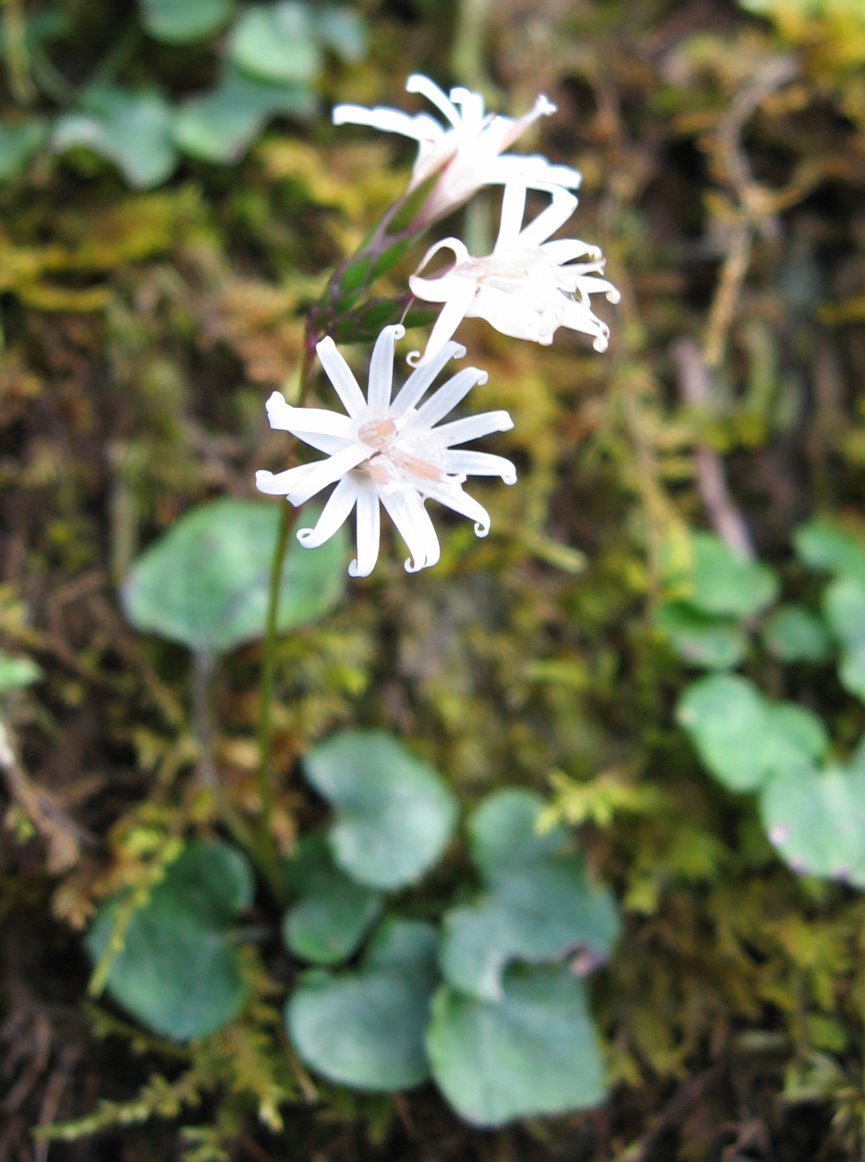
- Ainsliaea apiculata

Scientific classification
- Kingdom: Plantae
- Clade: Tracheophytes
- Clade: Angiosperms
- Clade: Eudicots
- Clade: Asterids
- Order: Asterales
- Family: Asteraceae
- Subfamily: Pertyoideae; Panero & V.A.Funk
- Tribe: Pertyeae; Panero & V.A.Funk

Genera
- Ainsliaea; Catamixis; Diaspananthus; Macroclinidium; Myripnois; Pertya

= Pertyoideae =

Subfamily of flowering plants

The Pertyoideae are a subfamily of the family Asteraceae of the flowering plants. It comprises a single tribe, Pertyeae, of six genera.
