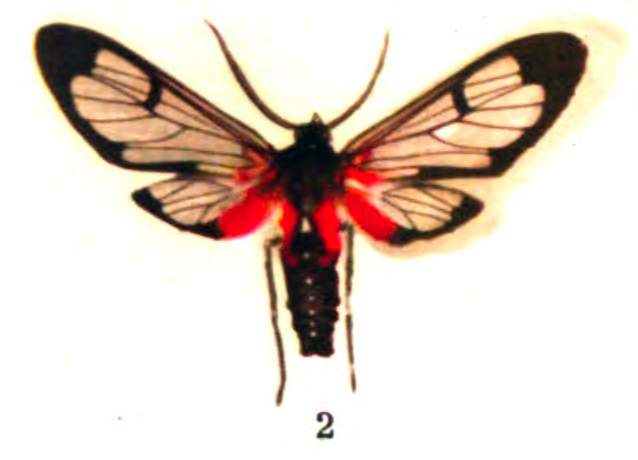
- Erruca cardinale

Scientific classification
- Kingdom: Animalia
- Phylum: Arthropoda
- Class: Insecta
- Order: Lepidoptera
- Superfamily: Noctuoidea
- Family: Erebidae
- Subfamily: Arctiinae
- Subtribe: Euchromiina
- Genus: Erruca; Walker, 1854

Synonyms
- Lagaria Walker, 1854 (preocc.); Aristodaema Wallengren, 1858; Aristodaema Wallengren, 1861; Rezia Kirby, 1892

= Erruca =

Genus of moths

Erruca is a genus of tiger moths in the subfamily Arctiinae erected by Francis Walker in 1854. Most species were formerly included in the genera Cosmosoma or Mallodeta.

== Species ==
- Erruca cardinale (Hampson, 1898)
- Erruca consors (Walker, 1854)
- Erruca cruenta (Perty, 1834)
- Erruca deyrolii (Walker, 1854)
- Erruca erythrarchos (Walker, 1854)
- Erruca hanga (Herrich-Schäffer, [1854])
- Erruca sanguipuncta (Druce, 1898)
