= Erruca cruenta =

Scientific classification
- Domain: Eukaryota
- Kingdom: Animalia
- Phylum: Arthropoda
- Class: Insecta
- Order: Lepidoptera
- Superfamily: Noctuoidea
- Family: Erebidae
- Subfamily: Arctiinae
- Genus: Erruca
- Species: E. cruenta

Binomial name
- Erruca cruenta (Perty, 1834)

Synonyms
- Glaucopis cruenta Perty, 1834

Species of moth

Erruca cruenta is a moth of the family Erebidae. It was described by Maximilian Perty in 1834. It is found in the Amazon region.
