= Lepiselaga =

Scientific classification
- Kingdom: Animalia
- Phylum: Arthropoda
- Class: Insecta
- Order: Diptera
- Family: Tabanidae
- Subfamily: Tabaninae
- Tribe: Diachlorini
- Genus: Lepiselaga; Macquart, 1938

Type species
- Tabanus lepidotus Fabricius, 1805

Synonyms
- Hadrus Perty, 1833; Lepidoselaga Agassiz, 1846; Lepisclaga Bellardi, 1859; Lepidoselaga Loew, 1869

Genus of flies

Lepiselaga is a genus of horse flies in the family Tabanidae.

== Species ==
- Lepiselaga albitarsis Macquart, 1850
- Lepiselaga colombiana Fairchild, 1966
- Lepiselaga crassipes (Fabricius, 1805)
