= Sceloenopla goniaptera =

Scientific classification
- Kingdom: Animalia
- Phylum: Arthropoda
- Class: Insecta
- Order: Coleoptera
- Suborder: Polyphaga
- Infraorder: Cucujiformia
- Family: Chrysomelidae
- Genus: Sceloenopla
- Species: S. goniaptera

Binomial name
- Sceloenopla goniaptera (Perty, 1832)

Synonyms
- Chalepus goniapterus Perty, 1832

Species of beetle

Sceloenopla goniaptera is a species of beetle of the family Chrysomelidae. It is found in Brazil (Amazonas).

== Life history ==
No host plant has been documented for this species.
