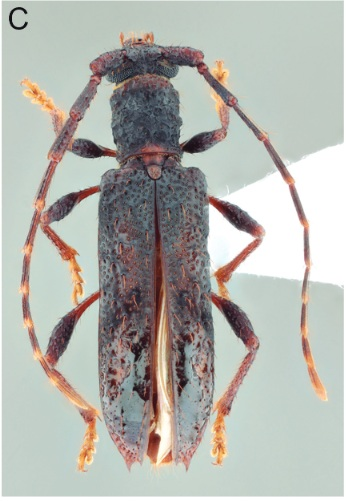

Scientific classification
- Kingdom: Animalia
- Phylum: Arthropoda
- Clade: Pancrustacea
- Class: Insecta
- Order: Coleoptera
- Suborder: Polyphaga
- Infraorder: Cucujiformia
- Family: Cerambycidae
- Genus: Hemilissa
- Species: H. gummosa

Binomial name
- Hemilissa gummosa (Perty, 1832)

Synonyms
- Acanthoptera gummosa Perty, 1832

= Hemilissa gummosa =

Species of beetle

Hemilissa gummosa is a species of beetle in the family Cerambycidae. It was described by German naturalist Maximilian Perty in 1832. It is found in Bolivia, Brazil, Argentina and Paraguay.
