= Alienosternus simplex =

Scientific classification
- Kingdom: Animalia
- Phylum: Arthropoda
- Class: Insecta
- Order: Coleoptera
- Suborder: Polyphaga
- Infraorder: Cucujiformia
- Family: Cerambycidae
- Genus: Alienosternus
- Species: A. simplex

Binomial name
- Alienosternus simplex Martins, 1976

Species of beetle

Alienosternus simplex is a species of beetle in the family Cerambycidae.
