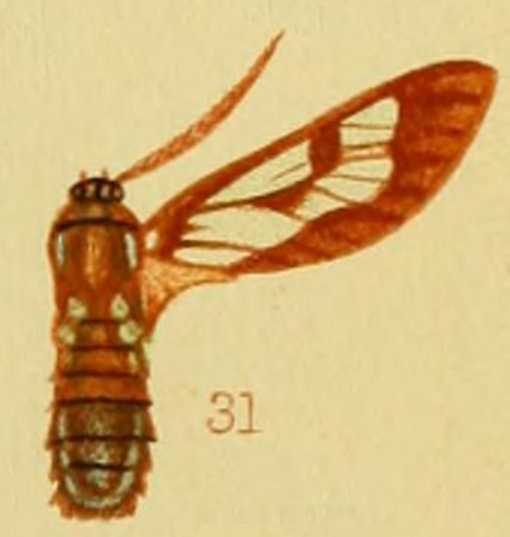
- P. nephelophora ♂.

Scientific classification
- Domain: Eukaryota
- Kingdom: Animalia
- Phylum: Arthropoda
- Class: Insecta
- Order: Lepidoptera
- Superfamily: Noctuoidea
- Family: Erebidae
- Subfamily: Arctiinae
- Genus: Pseudosphenoptera
- Species: P. nephelophora

Binomial name
- Pseudosphenoptera nephelophora Hampson, 1914

Synonyms
- Gymnelia cochonis Strand, 1917

= Pseudosphenoptera nephelophora =

Species of moth

Pseudosphenoptera nephelophora is a moth in the subfamily Arctiinae. It is found in Brazil.
