= Hemilissa =

Scientific classification
- Kingdom: Animalia
- Phylum: Arthropoda
- Clade: Pancrustacea
- Class: Insecta
- Order: Coleoptera
- Suborder: Polyphaga
- Infraorder: Cucujiformia
- Family: Cerambycidae
- Subfamily: Cerambycinae
- Tribe: Piezocerini
- Genus: Hemilissa; Pascoe, 1858

Genus of beetles

Hemilissa is a genus of beetles in the family Cerambycidae, containing the following species:

== Species ==
- Hemilissa bifasciata García, Botero & Martínez, 2020
- Hemilissa birai Galileo, Bezark & Santos-Silva, 2016
- Hemilissa catapotia Martins, 1976
- Hemilissa claudiae García, Botero & Martínez, 2020
- Hemilissa cornuta Bates, 1870
- Hemilissa emblema Martins, 1976
- Hemilissa erikae García, Botero & Martínez, 2020
- Hemilissa fabulosa Martins, 1985
- Hemilissa gummosa (Perty, 1832)
- Hemilissa opaca Martins, 1976
- Hemilissa picturata Galileo & Martins, 2000
- Hemilissa quadrispinosa Gounelle, 1913
- Hemilissa rufa Melzer, 1934
- Hemilissa striatothorax Vlasák & Santos-Silva, 2025
- Hemilissa sulcicollis Bates, 1870
- Hemilissa undulaticollis Zajciw, 1960

A further species, Hemilissa violascens (Perty, 1832) is currently considered as incertae sedis in Cerambycinae.
