= Haruspex ornatus =

Scientific classification
- Kingdom: Animalia
- Phylum: Arthropoda
- Class: Insecta
- Order: Coleoptera
- Suborder: Polyphaga
- Infraorder: Cucujiformia
- Family: Cerambycidae
- Genus: Haruspex
- Species: H. ornatus

Binomial name
- Haruspex ornatus Bates, 1870

Species of beetle

Haruspex ornatus is a species of beetle in the family Cerambycidae. It was described by Bates in 1870.
