= Hemilissa rufa =

Scientific classification
- Kingdom: Animalia
- Phylum: Arthropoda
- Class: Insecta
- Order: Coleoptera
- Suborder: Polyphaga
- Infraorder: Cucujiformia
- Family: Cerambycidae
- Genus: Hemilissa
- Species: H. rufa

Binomial name
- Hemilissa rufa Melzer, 1934

Species of beetle

Hemilissa rufa is a species of beetle in the family Cerambycidae. It was described by Melzer in 1934.
