= Hemilissa picturata =

Scientific classification
- Kingdom: Animalia
- Phylum: Arthropoda
- Class: Insecta
- Order: Coleoptera
- Suborder: Polyphaga
- Infraorder: Cucujiformia
- Family: Cerambycidae
- Genus: Hemilissa
- Species: H. picturata

Binomial name
- Hemilissa picturata Galileo & Martins, 2000

Species of beetle

Hemilissa picturata is a species of beetle in the family Cerambycidae. It was described by Galileo and Martins in 2000.
