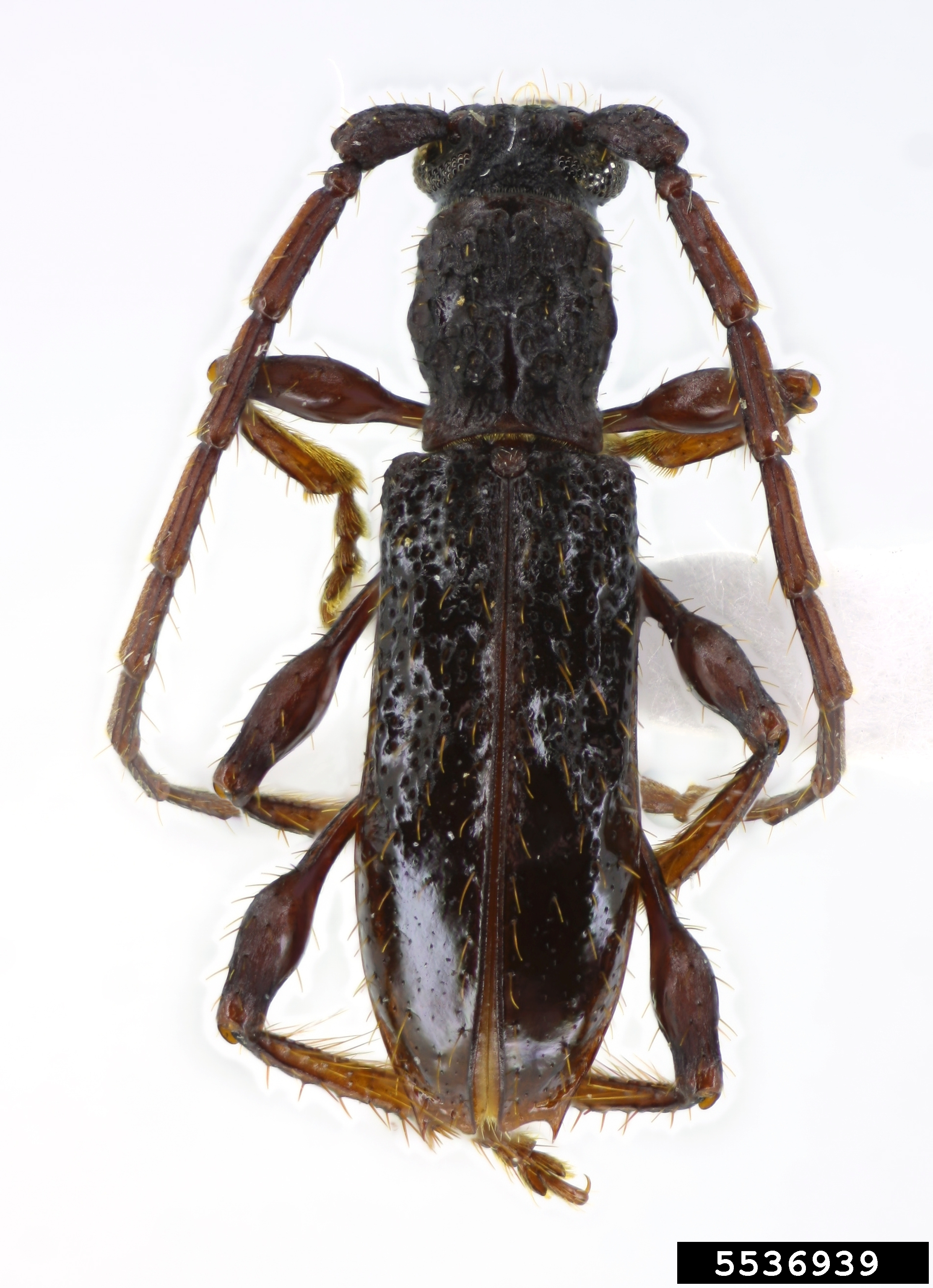
- Longhorned Beetle (Hemilissa emblema), Eugenio Nearns, Longicorn ID, USDA APHIS ITP, Bugwood.org

Scientific classification
- Kingdom: Animalia
- Phylum: Arthropoda
- Class: Insecta
- Order: Coleoptera
- Suborder: Polyphaga
- Infraorder: Cucujiformia
- Family: Cerambycidae
- Genus: Hemilissa
- Species: H. emblema

Binomial name
- Hemilissa emblema Martins, 1976

= Hemilissa emblema =

Species of beetle

Hemilissa emblema is a species of beetle in the family Cerambycidae. It was described by Martins in 1976.
