= Gymnelia stuarti =

Scientific classification
- Kingdom: Animalia
- Phylum: Arthropoda
- Clade: Pancrustacea
- Class: Insecta
- Order: Lepidoptera
- Superfamily: Noctuoidea
- Family: Erebidae
- Subfamily: Arctiinae
- Genus: Gymnelia
- Species: G. stuarti

Binomial name
- Gymnelia stuarti Rothschild, 1911

Species of moth

Gymnelia stuarti is a moth of the subfamily Arctiinae. It was described by Rothschild in 1911. It is found in Brazil (Amazonas).
