= Gymnelia hyaloxantha =

Scientific classification
- Kingdom: Animalia
- Phylum: Arthropoda
- Clade: Pancrustacea
- Class: Insecta
- Order: Lepidoptera
- Superfamily: Noctuoidea
- Family: Erebidae
- Subfamily: Arctiinae
- Genus: Gymnelia
- Species: G. hyaloxantha

Binomial name
- Gymnelia hyaloxantha Dognin, 1914

Species of moth

Gymnelia hyaloxantha is a moth of the subfamily Arctiinae. It was described by Paul Dognin in 1914. It is found in Colombia.
