= Gymnelia buckleyi =

Scientific classification
- Kingdom: Animalia
- Phylum: Arthropoda
- Clade: Pancrustacea
- Class: Insecta
- Order: Lepidoptera
- Superfamily: Noctuoidea
- Family: Erebidae
- Subfamily: Arctiinae
- Genus: Gymnelia
- Species: G. buckleyi

Binomial name
- Gymnelia buckleyi (H. Druce, 1883)

Synonyms
- Homoeocera buckleyi H. Druce, 1883; Dasysphinx buckleyi

Species of moth

Gymnelia buckleyi is a moth of the subfamily Arctiinae. It was described by Herbert Druce in 1883. It is found in Ecuador.
