= Alienosternus =

Scientific classification
- Kingdom: Animalia
- Phylum: Arthropoda
- Class: Insecta
- Order: Coleoptera
- Suborder: Polyphaga
- Infraorder: Cucujiformia
- Family: Cerambycidae
- Subfamily: Cerambycinae
- Tribe: Piezocerini
- Subtribe: Piezocerina
- Genus: Alienosternus; Martins, 1976

Genus of beetles

Alienosternus is a genus of beetles in the family Cerambycidae, containing the following species:

- Alienosternus cristatus (Zajciw, 1970)
- Alienosternus metallicus Martins, 1976
- Alienosternus simplex Martins, 1976
- Alienosternus solitarius (Gounelle, 1909)
