= Haruspex quadripustulatus =

Scientific classification
- Kingdom: Animalia
- Phylum: Arthropoda
- Class: Insecta
- Order: Coleoptera
- Suborder: Polyphaga
- Infraorder: Cucujiformia
- Family: Cerambycidae
- Genus: Haruspex
- Species: H. quadripustulatus

Binomial name
- Haruspex quadripustulatus Gounelle, 1909

Species of beetle

Haruspex quadripustulatus is a species of beetle in the family Cerambycidae. It was described by Gounelle in 1909.
