= Haruspex bivittis =

Scientific classification
- Kingdom: Animalia
- Phylum: Arthropoda
- Class: Insecta
- Order: Coleoptera
- Suborder: Polyphaga
- Infraorder: Cucujiformia
- Family: Cerambycidae
- Genus: Haruspex
- Species: H. bivittis

Binomial name
- Haruspex bivittis (White, 1855)

Species of beetle

Haruspex bivittis is a species of beetle in the family Cerambycidae. It was described by Scottish zoologist Adam White in 1855. The beetle's maximum size is 9mm. The beetle can be located in Amazonia, Argentina, Bolivia, and French Guiana.
