= Lepiselaga crassipes =

Scientific classification
- Kingdom: Animalia
- Phylum: Arthropoda
- Class: Insecta
- Order: Diptera
- Family: Tabanidae
- Subfamily: Tabaninae
- Tribe: Diachlorini
- Genus: Lepiselaga
- Species: L. crassipes

Binomial name
- Lepiselaga crassipes (Fabricius, 1805)

Synonyms
- Haematopota crassipes Fabricius, 1805; Tabanus lepidotus Wiedemann, 1828; Lepidoselaga recta Loew, 1869; Lepiselaga major Szilády, 1926; Lepidoselaga major Szilády, 1926; Lepidoselaga crassipes var. fenestrata Hack, 1953

Species of fly

Lepiselaga crassipes is a species of horse flies in the family Tabanidae.
