= Pseudosphenoptera =

Scientific classification
- Kingdom: Animalia
- Phylum: Arthropoda
- Class: Insecta
- Order: Lepidoptera
- Superfamily: Noctuoidea
- Family: Erebidae
- Subfamily: Arctiinae
- Genus: Pseudosphenoptera; Butler, 1876

Synonyms
- Chloropsinus Butler, 1876

Genus of moths

Pseudosphenoptera is a genus of moths in the subfamily Arctiinae.

== Species ==
- Pseudosphenoptera almonia Gaede, 1926
- Pseudosphenoptera basalis Walker, 1854
- Pseudosphenoptera boyi Zerny, 1931
- Pseudosphenoptera chimaera Rothschild, 1911
- Pseudosphenoptera chrysorrhoea Draudt, 1931
- Pseudosphenoptera cocho Schaus, 1898
- Pseudosphenoptera nephelophora Hampson, 1914
