= Gymnelia pavo =

Scientific classification
- Kingdom: Animalia
- Phylum: Arthropoda
- Clade: Pancrustacea
- Class: Insecta
- Order: Lepidoptera
- Superfamily: Noctuoidea
- Family: Erebidae
- Subfamily: Arctiinae
- Genus: Gymnelia
- Species: G. pavo

Binomial name
- Gymnelia pavo Hampson, 1914

Species of moth

Gymnelia pavo is a moth of the subfamily Arctiinae. It was described by George Hampson in 1914. It is found in Guyana.
