= Pseudosphenoptera boyi =

Scientific classification
- Domain: Eukaryota
- Kingdom: Animalia
- Phylum: Arthropoda
- Class: Insecta
- Order: Lepidoptera
- Superfamily: Noctuoidea
- Family: Erebidae
- Subfamily: Arctiinae
- Genus: Pseudosphenoptera
- Species: P. boyi

Binomial name
- Pseudosphenoptera boyi Zerny, 1931

Species of moth

Pseudosphenoptera boyi is a moth in the subfamily Arctiinae. It is found in Brazil.
