= Gymnelia villia =

Scientific classification
- Kingdom: Animalia
- Phylum: Arthropoda
- Clade: Pancrustacea
- Class: Insecta
- Order: Lepidoptera
- Superfamily: Noctuoidea
- Family: Erebidae
- Subfamily: Arctiinae
- Genus: Gymnelia
- Species: G. villia

Binomial name
- Gymnelia villia H. Druce, 1906

Species of moth

Gymnelia villia is a moth of the subfamily Arctiinae. It was described by Herbert Druce in 1906. It is found in Peru.
