= Pseudosphenoptera basalis =

Scientific classification
- Kingdom: Animalia
- Phylum: Arthropoda
- Class: Insecta
- Order: Lepidoptera
- Superfamily: Noctuoidea
- Family: Erebidae
- Subfamily: Arctiinae
- Genus: Pseudosphenoptera
- Species: P. basalis

Binomial name
- Pseudosphenoptera basalis (Walker, 1854)

Synonyms
- Euchromia basalis Walker, 1854; Chloropsinus lanceolatus Butler, 1876; Pseudosphenoptera pitthea Druce, 1896

Species of moth

Pseudosphenoptera basalis is a moth in the subfamily Arctiinae first described by Francis Walker in 1854. It is found in Brazil (Tefé, São Paulo).
