= Erruca erythrarchos =

Scientific classification
- Kingdom: Animalia
- Phylum: Arthropoda
- Clade: Pancrustacea
- Class: Insecta
- Order: Lepidoptera
- Superfamily: Noctuoidea
- Family: Erebidae
- Subfamily: Arctiinae
- Genus: Erruca
- Species: E. erythrarchos

Binomial name
- Erruca erythrarchos (Walker, 1854)

Synonyms
- Glaucopis erythrarchos Walker, 1854; Laemocharis vulnerata Herrich-Schäffer, [1854]; Laemocharis ignicolor Ménétriés, 1857

Species of moth

Erruca erythrarchos is a moth of the family Erebidae. It was described by Francis Walker in 1854. It is found in Brazil.
