= Gymnelia torquatus =

Scientific classification
- Kingdom: Animalia
- Phylum: Arthropoda
- Clade: Pancrustacea
- Class: Insecta
- Order: Lepidoptera
- Superfamily: Noctuoidea
- Family: Erebidae
- Subfamily: Arctiinae
- Genus: Gymnelia
- Species: G. torquatus

Binomial name
- Gymnelia torquatus H. Druce, 1883

Synonyms
- Dasysphinx torquata (H. Druce, 1883)

Species of moth

Gymnelia torquatus is a moth of the subfamily Arctiinae. It was described by Herbert Druce in 1883. It is found in Brazil.
