= Piezasteria =

Scientific classification
- Kingdom: Animalia
- Phylum: Arthropoda
- Class: Insecta
- Order: Coleoptera
- Suborder: Polyphaga
- Infraorder: Cucujiformia
- Family: Cerambycidae
- Tribe: Piezocerini
- Genus: Piezasteria

Genus of beetles

Piezasteria is a genus of beetles in the family Cerambycidae, containing the following species:

- Piezasteria helenae Martins, 1985
- Piezasteria sternalis Martins, 1976
