= Pharcidodes =

Scientific classification
- Kingdom: Animalia
- Phylum: Arthropoda
- Class: Insecta
- Order: Coleoptera
- Suborder: Polyphaga
- Infraorder: Cucujiformia
- Family: Cerambycidae
- Subfamily: Cerambycinae
- Tribe: Piezocerini
- Genus: Pharcidodes; Martins, 1976

Type species
- Piezocera rubiginosa Thomson, 1878

Genus of beetles

Pharcidodes is a genus of beetles in the family Cerambycidae, containing the following species:

- Pharcidodes divisus Martins, 1976
- Pharcidodes nigripennis Martins, 1985
- Pharcidodes rubiginosus (Thomson, 1878)
- Pharcidodes suturalis (Gounelle, 1909)
