= Gymnelia ethodaea =

Scientific classification
- Kingdom: Animalia
- Phylum: Arthropoda
- Clade: Pancrustacea
- Class: Insecta
- Order: Lepidoptera
- Superfamily: Noctuoidea
- Family: Erebidae
- Subfamily: Arctiinae
- Genus: Gymnelia
- Species: G. ethodaea

Binomial name
- Gymnelia ethodaea H. Druce, 1889

Synonyms
- Gymnelia patagiata Dyar

Species of moth

Gymnelia ethodaea is a moth of the subfamily Arctiinae. It was described by Herbert Druce in 1889. It is found in Mexico.
