= Erruca deyrolii =

Scientific classification
- Kingdom: Animalia
- Phylum: Arthropoda
- Class: Insecta
- Order: Lepidoptera
- Superfamily: Noctuoidea
- Family: Erebidae
- Subfamily: Arctiinae
- Genus: Erruca
- Species: E. deyrolii

Binomial name
- Erruca deyrolii (Walker, 1854)

Synonyms
- Glaucopsis deyrolii Walker, 1854; Glaucopis sortita Walker, 1854; Laemocharis deyrollii Herrich-Schäffer, [1854] (Emend.); Laemocharis aecyra Herrich-Schäffer, [1854]

Species of moth

Erruca deyrolii is a moth of the family Erebidae. It was described by Francis Walker in 1854. It is found in South America.
