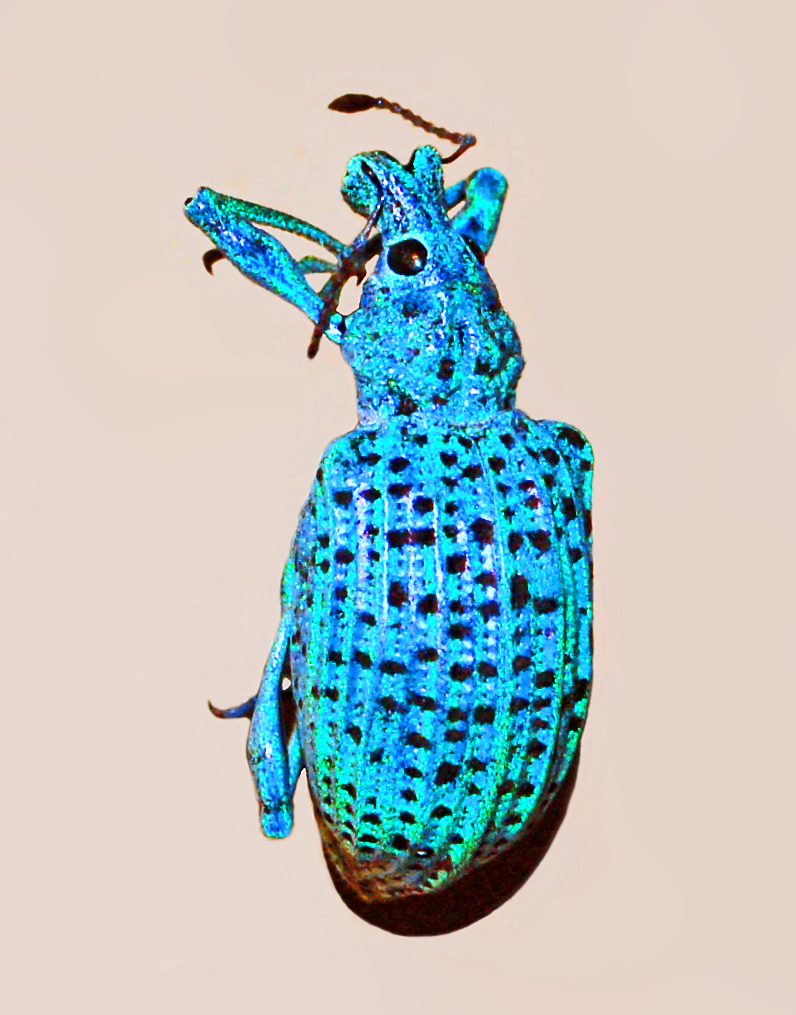
- Rhigus nigrosparsus from Brazil

Scientific classification
- Kingdom: Animalia
- Phylum: Arthropoda
- Clade: Pancrustacea
- Class: Insecta
- Order: Coleoptera
- Suborder: Polyphaga
- Infraorder: Cucujiformia
- Superfamily: Curculionoidea
- Family: Curculionidae
- Tribe: Entimini
- Genus: Rhigus; Schoenherr, 1823

Synonyms
- Barysomus Schoenherr, 1840; Rhigus Germar, 1824

= Rhigus =

Genus of beetles

Rhigus is a genus of beetles belonging to the family Curculionidae.

== List of species ==
- Rhigus aesopus Schoenherr, 1826
- Rhigus agricola Boheman, 1840
- Rhigus araneiformis Schoenherr, 1826
- Rhigus assimilis Cristofori & Jan, 1832
- Rhigus atrox Germar, 1824
- Rhigus bidentatus Boheman, 1833
- Rhigus brunneus Bovie, 1907
- Rhigus coelestinus Perty, 1832
- Rhigus conspurcatus Cristofori & Jan, 1832
- Rhigus contaminatus Dejean,
- Rhigus dejeanii Gyllenhal 1833
- Rhigus faldermanni Boheman, 1840
- Rhigus fischeri Gyllenhal, 1833
- Rhigus gyllenhalii Boheman, 1833
- Rhigus horridus Schoenherr, 1826
- Rhigus hypocrita Schneider, 1828
- Rhigus irroratus Boheman, 1840
- Rhigus lateritius Gyllenhal, 1833
- Rhigus latruncularius Perty, 1832
- Rhigus mannerheimii Gyllenhal, 1833
- Rhigus melanozugos Schoenherr, 1826
- Rhigus multipunctatus Dejean, 1835
- Rhigus mutillarius Perty, 1832
- Rhigus myrmosarius Perty, 1832
- Rhigus nigrosparsus Perty, 1830
- Rhigus obesus Dejean,
- Rhigus phaleratus Perty 1832
- Rhigus schueppelii Germar 1824
- Rhigus smaragdulus Herbst, J.F.W., 1795
- Rhigus speciosus Schoenherr, 1840
- Rhigus suturalis Hope,
- Rhigus tesserulatus Schoenherr, 1826
- Rhigus tribuloides Schoenherr, 1823
- Rhigus tumidus Dalman, 1833
- Rhigus vespertilio Pascoe, F.P., 1881
