= Haruspex celatus =

Scientific classification
- Kingdom: Animalia
- Phylum: Arthropoda
- Class: Insecta
- Order: Coleoptera
- Suborder: Polyphaga
- Infraorder: Cucujiformia
- Family: Cerambycidae
- Genus: Haruspex
- Species: H. celatus

Binomial name
- Haruspex celatus Lane, 1970

Species of beetle

Haruspex celatus is a species of beetle in the family Cerambycidae. It was described by Lane in 1970.
