= Haruspex (beetle) =

Scientific classification
- Kingdom: Animalia
- Phylum: Arthropoda
- Class: Insecta
- Order: Coleoptera
- Suborder: Polyphaga
- Infraorder: Cucujiformia
- Family: Cerambycidae
- Tribe: Piezocerini
- Genus: Haruspex; Thomson, 1864

Genus of beetles

Haruspex is a genus of beetles in the family Cerambycidae, containing these species:

- Haruspex bivittis (White, 1855)
- Haruspex brevipes (White, 1855)
- Haruspex celatus Lane, 1970
- Haruspex daithmus Martins, 1976
- Haruspex inscriptus Gahan, 1895
- Haruspex insulsus Martins & Galileo, 2005
- Haruspex lineolatus Bates, 1870
- Haruspex mentitus Martins, 1976
- Haruspex modestus (White, 1855)
- Haruspex ornatus Bates, 1870
- Haruspex pictilis Martins, 1976
- Haruspex quadripustulatus Gounelle, 1909
- Haruspex submaculatus (White, 1855)
