= Haruspex insulsus =

Scientific classification
- Kingdom: Animalia
- Phylum: Arthropoda
- Class: Insecta
- Order: Coleoptera
- Suborder: Polyphaga
- Infraorder: Cucujiformia
- Family: Cerambycidae
- Genus: Haruspex
- Species: H. insulsus

Binomial name
- Haruspex insulsus Martins & Galileo, 2005

Species of beetle

Haruspex insulsus is a species of beetle in the family Cerambycidae. It was described by Martins and Galileo in 2005.
