= Gymnelia baroni =

Scientific classification
- Kingdom: Animalia
- Phylum: Arthropoda
- Clade: Pancrustacea
- Class: Insecta
- Order: Lepidoptera
- Superfamily: Noctuoidea
- Family: Erebidae
- Subfamily: Arctiinae
- Genus: Gymnelia
- Species: G. baroni

Binomial name
- Gymnelia baroni Rothschild, 1910

Species of moth

Gymnelia baroni is a moth of the subfamily Arctiinae. It was described by Rothschild in 1910. It is found in Ecuador.

The species name has a complex taxonomic history with confusion by later authors. Potentially three currently valid taxa exist, the earliest by Rothschild 1910, the subsequent by Rothschild 1911 with replacement name Gymnelia jordani Zerny, 1912, and a possible third of uncertain status, potentially needing a replacement name.

1: Gymnelia baroni Rothschild 1910 (in Ann. Mag. Nat. Hist: p. 510.)

Described "Gymnelia baroni, sp.n." from "Hab. Zamora, Ecuador, 3000-4000 feet (O.T. Baron), 1 MAL" with forewing 20 mm.

2: Gymnelia jordani Zerny, 1912 (replacement name for Gymnelia baroni Rothschild 1911 (in Nov. Zool.: p. 28.; also Gymnelia ottonis Rothschild, 1913 superfluous replacement name: *Gymnelia ottonis Rothschild 1913)

Described "Gymnelia baroni, sp.n." from "Zamora, Ecuador, 3000-4000 ft. (O.T. Baron), 1 MAL; Huancabama, Cerro de Pasco, Peru (E. Bottger), 1 MAL" with forewing 24 mm.

(Note: Zerny, 1912 [in Wagner, Lep. Cat. 7: 58] writes (p. 58) "Jordani Zerny nom. nov. Baroni Rothsch., Nov. Zool. 18, p. 28 (1911) (nec Rothsoh. 1910). Ecuador, Peru." On same page he lists the older "Gymnelia baroni Rothschild 1910" as remaining valid as "Baroni Rothsch., Ann. & Mag. Nat. Hist. (8) 5, p. 510 (1910). Ecuador") Subsequently, Rothschild, 1913 [Novit. Zool. 20: 470, pl. 13, f. 21] writes (p. 470) in a figure legend as "21. Grymnelia ottonis Rothsch. nom. nov, for baroni ...." "Nov. Zool. vol. xviii. p.28", therefore after Zerny, 1912 leading to a superfluous replacement.

3: Gymnelia sp. "baroni" (in Rothschild 1911) From Cosmosoma baroni Rothschild 1911 (in Nov. Zool.: p. 32.). Hampson, 1914 gives revised combination Gymnelia baroni (Rothschild 1911) without comment on other previous usages, apparently forming a secondary homonym)

Described "Gymnelia baroni, sp.n." from "Hab. Zamora, Ecuador, 3000-4000 ft. (O.T. Baron), 1 MAL" with forewing 18 mm.

(Note: Hampson, 1914 [in Cat. Lepid. Phalaenae Br. Mus. (Suppl.) 1: 119] writes (p. 119) "*390 s. Gymnelia baroni." "Cosmosoma baroni, Roths. Nov. Zool. xviii. p. 32 (1911), & xx. p. 472, pl. xiv. f. 41." and "Hab. Ecuador, Zamora (Baron), type + MAL in Coll. Rothschild. Exp. 40 millim.")
