= Haruspex pictilis =

Scientific classification
- Kingdom: Animalia
- Phylum: Arthropoda
- Class: Insecta
- Order: Coleoptera
- Suborder: Polyphaga
- Infraorder: Cucujiformia
- Family: Cerambycidae
- Genus: Haruspex
- Species: H. pictilis

Binomial name
- Haruspex pictilis Martins, 1976

Species of beetle

Haruspex pictilis is a species of beetle in the family Cerambycidae. It was described by Martins in 1976.
