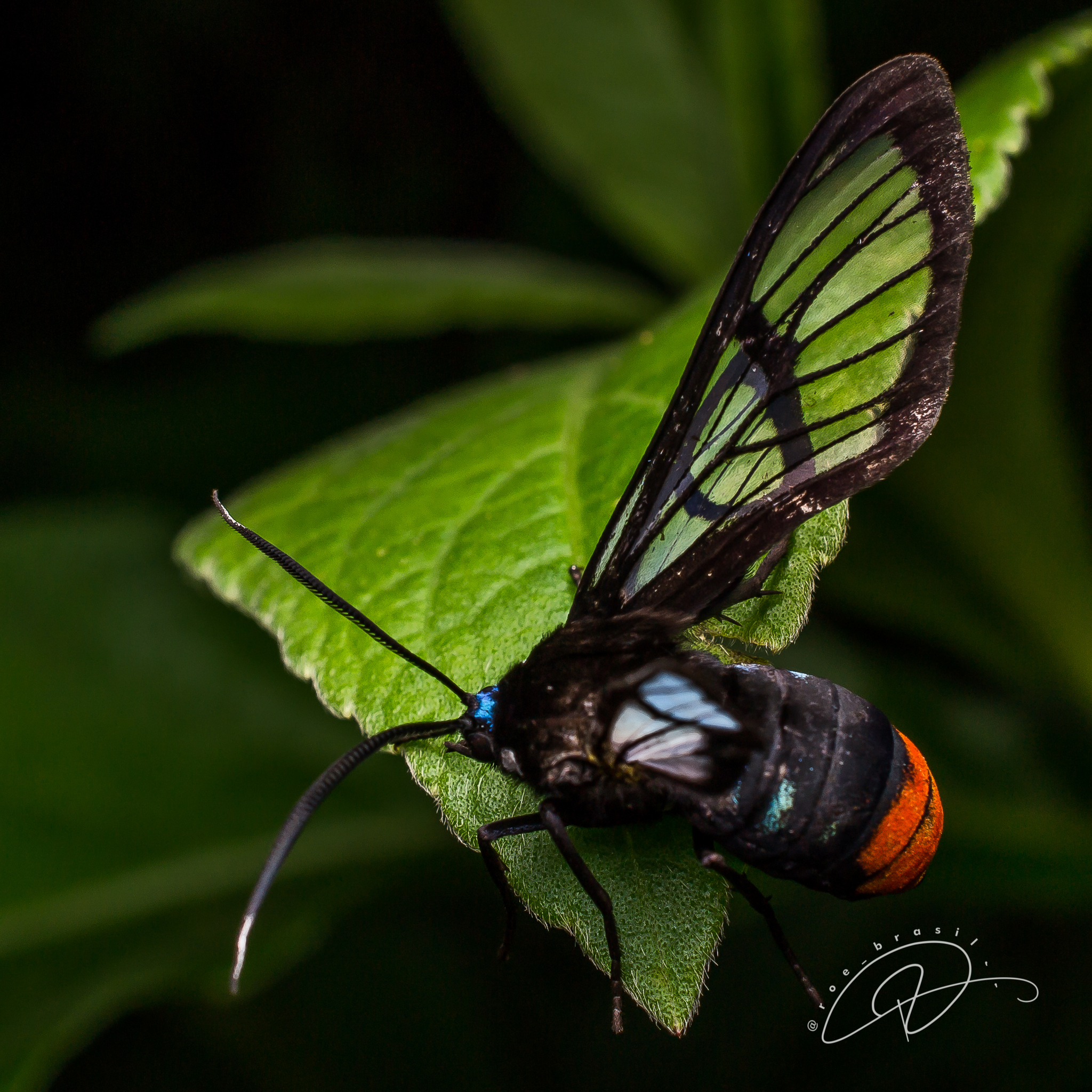

Scientific classification
- Kingdom: Animalia
- Phylum: Arthropoda
- Clade: Pancrustacea
- Class: Insecta
- Order: Lepidoptera
- Superfamily: Noctuoidea
- Family: Erebidae
- Subfamily: Arctiinae
- Genus: Gymnelia
- Species: G. paranapanema

Binomial name
- Gymnelia paranapanema Dognin, 1911

= Gymnelia paranapanema =

Species of moth

Gymnelia paranapanema is a species of moth in the subfamily Arctiinae. It was described by Paul Dognin in 1911 and is found in São Paulo, Brazil.
