= Gymnelia cennocha =

Scientific classification
- Kingdom: Animalia
- Phylum: Arthropoda
- Clade: Pancrustacea
- Class: Insecta
- Order: Lepidoptera
- Superfamily: Noctuoidea
- Family: Erebidae
- Subfamily: Arctiinae
- Genus: Gymnelia
- Species: G. cennocha

Binomial name
- Gymnelia cennocha Schaus, 1924

Species of moth

Gymnelia cennocha is a moth of the subfamily Arctiinae. It was described by William Schaus in 1924. It is found in Panama.
