= Gymnelia gemmifera =

Scientific classification
- Kingdom: Animalia
- Phylum: Arthropoda
- Clade: Pancrustacea
- Class: Insecta
- Order: Lepidoptera
- Superfamily: Noctuoidea
- Family: Erebidae
- Subfamily: Arctiinae
- Genus: Gymnelia
- Species: G. gemmifera

Binomial name
- Gymnelia gemmifera (Walker, 1854)

Synonyms
- Glaucopis gemmifera Walker, 1854

Species of moth

Gymnelia gemmifera is a moth of the subfamily Arctiinae. It was described by Francis Walker in 1854. It is found in Venezuela.
