= Gymnelia semicincta =

Scientific classification
- Kingdom: Animalia
- Phylum: Arthropoda
- Clade: Pancrustacea
- Class: Insecta
- Order: Lepidoptera
- Superfamily: Noctuoidea
- Family: Erebidae
- Subfamily: Arctiinae
- Genus: Gymnelia
- Species: G. semicincta

Binomial name
- Gymnelia semicincta Kaye, 1910

Species of moth

Gymnelia semicincta is a moth of the subfamily Arctiinae. It was described by William James Kaye in 1910. It is found in Colombia.
