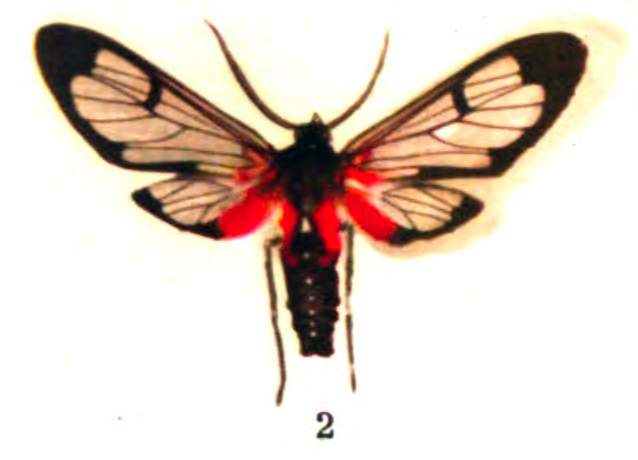

Scientific classification
- Domain: Eukaryota
- Kingdom: Animalia
- Phylum: Arthropoda
- Class: Insecta
- Order: Lepidoptera
- Superfamily: Noctuoidea
- Family: Erebidae
- Subfamily: Arctiinae
- Genus: Erruca
- Species: E. cardinale

Binomial name
- Erruca cardinale (Hampson, 1898)

Synonyms
- Cosmosoma cardinalis; Cosmosoma cardinale

= Erruca cardinale =

Species of moth

Erruca cardinale is a moth of the family Erebidae and described by George Hampson in 1898. It is found in Brazil and Argentina.

First described from São Paulo, this moth is also known from other parts of Brazil like Bahia, Espirito Santo, Rio de Janeiro, Minas Gerais, and Santa Catarina (specifically in the towns of Bom Jardim da Serra, Brusque, Joinville and São Bento do Sul), and from Argentina. Erruca cardinale is described as a day-flying moth, meaning that unlike most species of moth it is active during the day and sleeps at night. In volume one of the Catalogue of the Lepidoptera Phalaenae (1898) E. cardinale is described as follows:

Black-brown; antennae white at tips; tegulae with white points; patagia with crimson patches; legs with white spots; abdomen with lateral patches of crimson at base, and dorsal and two lateral series of white points, the 1st dorsal spot large; wings hyaline, the veins and margins black. Fore wing with crimson spot below base of median nervure and patch on basal part of inner margin followed by a whiteish mark; a discocellular black patch; the terminal band very wide on apical area and expanding at tornus; cilia white at apex. Hind wing with the innter area brilliant crimson; the terminal band expanding slightly at apex and above tornus.
