= Pharcidodes nigripennis =

Scientific classification
- Kingdom: Animalia
- Phylum: Arthropoda
- Class: Insecta
- Order: Coleoptera
- Suborder: Polyphaga
- Infraorder: Cucujiformia
- Family: Cerambycidae
- Genus: Pharcidodes
- Species: P. nigripennis

Binomial name
- Pharcidodes nigripennis Martins, 1985

Species of beetle

Pharcidodes nigripennis is a species of beetle in the family Cerambycidae. It was described by Martins in 1985.
