= Gymnelia dubia =

Scientific classification
- Kingdom: Animalia
- Phylum: Arthropoda
- Clade: Pancrustacea
- Class: Insecta
- Order: Lepidoptera
- Superfamily: Noctuoidea
- Family: Erebidae
- Subfamily: Arctiinae
- Genus: Gymnelia
- Species: G. dubium

Binomial name
- Gymnelia dubium (Rothschild, 1911)

Species of moth

Gymnelia dubium is a moth of the subfamily Arctiinae. It was described by Rothschild in 1911. It is found on Jamaica.

Note: The species name dubia may be technically correct spelling if interpret the current genus Gymnelia as feminine, however any usage derives from the original Cosmosoma dubium Rothschild, 1911; Novit. Zool. 18 (1): 34.
