= Piezasteria sternalis =

Scientific classification
- Kingdom: Animalia
- Phylum: Arthropoda
- Class: Insecta
- Order: Coleoptera
- Suborder: Polyphaga
- Infraorder: Cucujiformia
- Family: Cerambycidae
- Genus: Piezasteria
- Species: P. sternalis

Binomial name
- Piezasteria sternalis Martins, 1976

Species of beetle

Piezasteria sternalis is a species of beetle in the family Cerambycidae. It was described by Martins in 1976.
