= Pharcidodes rubiginosus =

Scientific classification
- Kingdom: Animalia
- Phylum: Arthropoda
- Class: Insecta
- Order: Coleoptera
- Suborder: Polyphaga
- Infraorder: Cucujiformia
- Family: Cerambycidae
- Genus: Pharcidodes
- Species: P. rubiginosus

Binomial name
- Pharcidodes rubiginosus (Thomson, 1878)

Species of beetle

Pharcidodes rubiginosus is a species of beetle in the family Cerambycidae. It was described by Thomson in 1878.
