= Gymnelia taos =

Scientific classification
- Kingdom: Animalia
- Phylum: Arthropoda
- Clade: Pancrustacea
- Class: Insecta
- Order: Lepidoptera
- Superfamily: Noctuoidea
- Family: Erebidae
- Subfamily: Arctiinae
- Genus: Gymnelia
- Species: G. taos

Binomial name
- Gymnelia taos Hampson, 1898

Species of moth

Gymnelia taos is a moth of the subfamily Arctiinae. It was described by George Hampson in 1898. It is found in Colombia.
