= Alienosternus solitarius =

Scientific classification
- Kingdom: Animalia
- Phylum: Arthropoda
- Class: Insecta
- Order: Coleoptera
- Suborder: Polyphaga
- Infraorder: Cucujiformia
- Family: Cerambycidae
- Genus: Alienosternus
- Species: A. solitarius

Binomial name
- Alienosternus solitarius (Gounelle, 1909)

Species of beetle

Alienosternus solitarius is a species of beetle in the family Cerambycidae.
