= Gymnelia hampsoni =

Scientific classification
- Kingdom: Animalia
- Phylum: Arthropoda
- Clade: Pancrustacea
- Class: Insecta
- Order: Lepidoptera
- Superfamily: Noctuoidea
- Family: Erebidae
- Subfamily: Arctiinae
- Genus: Gymnelia
- Species: G. hampsoni

Binomial name
- Gymnelia hampsoni Klages, 1906

Species of moth

Gymnelia hampsoni is a moth of the subfamily Arctiinae. It was described by Edward A. Klages in 1906. It is found in Venezuela.
