= Pharcidodes divisus =

Scientific classification
- Kingdom: Animalia
- Phylum: Arthropoda
- Class: Insecta
- Order: Coleoptera
- Suborder: Polyphaga
- Infraorder: Cucujiformia
- Family: Cerambycidae
- Genus: Pharcidodes
- Species: P. divisus

Binomial name
- Pharcidodes divisus Martins, 1976

Species of beetle

Pharcidodes divisus is a species of beetle in the family Cerambycidae. It was described by Martins in 1976.
