= Gymnelia pitthea =

Scientific classification
- Kingdom: Animalia
- Phylum: Arthropoda
- Clade: Pancrustacea
- Class: Insecta
- Order: Lepidoptera
- Superfamily: Noctuoidea
- Family: Erebidae
- Subfamily: Arctiinae
- Genus: Gymnelia
- Species: G. pitthea

Binomial name
- Gymnelia pitthea (H. Druce, 1896)

Synonyms
- Enioche pitthea (H. Druce, 1896); Pseudosphenoptera basalis (Walker, 1854)

Species of moth

Gymnelia pitthea is a moth of the subfamily Arctiinae. It was described by Herbert Druce in 1896. It is found in Peru.
