= Hemilissa violascens =

Scientific classification
- Kingdom: Animalia
- Phylum: Arthropoda
- Clade: Pancrustacea
- Class: Insecta
- Order: Coleoptera
- Suborder: Polyphaga
- Infraorder: Cucujiformia
- Family: Cerambycidae
- Genus: Hemilissa
- Species: H. violascens

Binomial name
- Hemilissa violascens (Perty, 1832)

Synonyms
- Acanthoptera violascens Perty, 1832

Species of beetle

Hemilissa violascens is a species of beetle in the family Cerambycidae. It was described by Perty in 1832. It is found in Brazil.
