= Pseudosphenoptera almonia =

Scientific classification
- Domain: Eukaryota
- Kingdom: Animalia
- Phylum: Arthropoda
- Class: Insecta
- Order: Lepidoptera
- Superfamily: Noctuoidea
- Family: Erebidae
- Subfamily: Arctiinae
- Genus: Pseudosphenoptera
- Species: P. almonia

Binomial name
- Pseudosphenoptera almonia Gaede, 1926

Species of moth

Pseudosphenoptera almonia is a moth in the subfamily Arctiinae. It is found in Peru.
