= Hemilissa cornuta =

Scientific classification
- Kingdom: Animalia
- Phylum: Arthropoda
- Class: Insecta
- Order: Coleoptera
- Suborder: Polyphaga
- Infraorder: Cucujiformia
- Family: Cerambycidae
- Genus: Hemilissa
- Species: H. cornuta

Binomial name
- Hemilissa cornuta Bates, 1870

Species of beetle

Hemilissa cornuta is a species of beetle in the family Cerambycidae. It was described by Henry Walter Bates in 1870.
