= Gymnelia lucens =

Scientific classification
- Kingdom: Animalia
- Phylum: Arthropoda
- Clade: Pancrustacea
- Class: Insecta
- Order: Lepidoptera
- Superfamily: Noctuoidea
- Family: Erebidae
- Subfamily: Arctiinae
- Genus: Gymnelia
- Species: G. lucens

Binomial name
- Gymnelia lucens Dognin, 1902

Species of moth

Gymnelia lucens is a moth of the subfamily Arctiinae. It was described by Paul Dognin in 1902. It is found in Colombia and Peru.
