= Ainsliaea elegans =

Scientific classification
- Kingdom: Plantae
- Clade: Tracheophytes
- Clade: Angiosperms
- Clade: Eudicots
- Clade: Asterids
- Order: Asterales
- Family: Asteraceae
- Genus: Ainsliaea
- Species: A. elegans

Binomial name
- Ainsliaea elegans Hemsl.

Synonyms
- Ainsliaea elegans Hayata, 1906; Ainsliaea elegans var. elegans; Ainsliaea elegans var. strigosa Mattf., 1931; Ainsliaea elegans var. tomentosa Mattf., 1931; Pertya esquirolii H.Lév.

Species of flowering plant

Ainsliaea elegans is a species of flowering plants in the family Asteraceae. It is found in China (Guizhou, Yunnan) and Vietnam.
