= Pseudosphenoptera chimaera =

Scientific classification
- Domain: Eukaryota
- Kingdom: Animalia
- Phylum: Arthropoda
- Class: Insecta
- Order: Lepidoptera
- Superfamily: Noctuoidea
- Family: Erebidae
- Subfamily: Arctiinae
- Genus: Pseudosphenoptera
- Species: P. chimaera

Binomial name
- Pseudosphenoptera chimaera (Rothschild, 1911)

Synonyms
- Gymnelia chimaera Rothschild, 1911

Species of moth

Pseudosphenoptera chimaera is a moth in the subfamily Arctiinae. It is found in Peru.

The length of the forewings is about 17 mm. The forewings are black, but brownish on the outer area. There is a patch of metallic blue scales and a streak of such scales in the cell. There is also a hyaline spot in the base of the cell and another below the base. The hindwings are reduced to a tuft of black hair of about 2 mm long.
