= Haruspex brevipes =

Scientific classification
- Kingdom: Animalia
- Phylum: Arthropoda
- Class: Insecta
- Order: Coleoptera
- Suborder: Polyphaga
- Infraorder: Cucujiformia
- Family: Cerambycidae
- Genus: Haruspex
- Species: H. brevipes

Binomial name
- Haruspex brevipes (White, 1855)

Species of beetle

Haruspex brevipes is a species of beetle in the family Cerambycidae. It was described by Scottish zoologist Adam White in 1855.
