= Hemilissa quadrispinosa =

Scientific classification
- Kingdom: Animalia
- Phylum: Arthropoda
- Class: Insecta
- Order: Coleoptera
- Suborder: Polyphaga
- Infraorder: Cucujiformia
- Family: Cerambycidae
- Genus: Hemilissa
- Species: H. quadrispinosa

Binomial name
- Hemilissa quadrispinosa Gounelle, 1913

Species of beetle

Hemilissa quadrispinosa is a species of beetle in the family Cerambycidae. It was described by Gounelle in 1913.
