= Haruspex inscriptus =

Scientific classification
- Kingdom: Animalia
- Phylum: Arthropoda
- Class: Insecta
- Order: Coleoptera
- Suborder: Polyphaga
- Infraorder: Cucujiformia
- Family: Cerambycidae
- Genus: Haruspex
- Species: H. inscriptus

Binomial name
- Haruspex inscriptus Gahan, 1895

Species of beetle

Haruspex inscriptus is a species of beetle in the family Cerambycidae. It was described by Gahan in 1895.
