= Hemilissa striatothorax =

Scientific classification
- Kingdom: Animalia
- Phylum: Arthropoda
- Clade: Pancrustacea
- Class: Insecta
- Order: Coleoptera
- Suborder: Polyphaga
- Infraorder: Cucujiformia
- Family: Cerambycidae
- Genus: Hemilissa
- Species: H. striatothorax

Binomial name
- Hemilissa striatothorax Vlasák & Santos-Silva, 2025

Species of beetle

Hemilissa striatothorax is a species of beetle of the family Cerambycidae. It is found in Ecuador.

== Description ==
Adults reach a length of about 7.55–11.45 mm (0.297–0.451 in). The head capsule is mostly dark reddish brown. The pronotum is dark brown with dark reddish‑brown areas and the scutellum is dark reddish brown with a dark‑brown area close to the margins. The elytra have a blackish longitudinal band, from the blackish circum‑scutellar area to the posterior quarter, not reaching the sutural margin, then brown to the apical sixth. There is a blackish longitudinal band on the anterior half close to the epipleural margin. The remaining anterior part is dark reddish brown. The posterior quarter is light yellowish‑brown except for the brownish sutural, epipleural, and apical margins.

== Etymology ==
The species name is derived from Latin striatus (meaning striated) and thorax and refers to the striated sculpturing of the pronotal disc.
