= Erruca hanga =

Scientific classification
- Kingdom: Animalia
- Phylum: Arthropoda
- Clade: Pancrustacea
- Class: Insecta
- Order: Lepidoptera
- Superfamily: Noctuoidea
- Family: Erebidae
- Subfamily: Arctiinae
- Genus: Erruca
- Species: E. hanga

Binomial name
- Erruca hanga (Herrich-Schäffer, [1854])

Synonyms
- Laemocharis hanga Herrich-Schäffer, [1854]; Aristodaema arauna Wallengren, 1858; Aristodaema arauna Wallengren, 1860

Species of moth

Erruca hanga is a moth of the family Erebidae. It was described by Gottlieb August Wilhelm Herrich-Schäffer in 1854. It is found in the Brazilian states of São Paulo, Espírito Santo and Rio de Janeiro.
