= Migorybia =

Migorybia miranda

Scientific classification
- Kingdom: Animalia
- Phylum: Arthropoda
- Class: Insecta
- Order: Coleoptera
- Suborder: Polyphaga
- Infraorder: Cucujiformia
- Family: Cerambycidae
- Genus: Migorybia
- Species: M. miranda

Binomial name
- Migorybia miranda Martins, 1985

Genus of beetles

Migorybia miranda is a species of beetle in the family Cerambycidae, the only species in the genus Migorybia.
