= Erruca sanguipuncta =

Scientific classification
- Domain: Eukaryota
- Kingdom: Animalia
- Phylum: Arthropoda
- Class: Insecta
- Order: Lepidoptera
- Superfamily: Noctuoidea
- Family: Erebidae
- Subfamily: Arctiinae
- Genus: Erruca
- Species: E. sanguipuncta

Binomial name
- Erruca sanguipuncta H. Druce, 1898

Species of moth

Erruca sanguipuncta is a moth of the family Erebidae. It was described by Herbert Druce in 1898. It is found in Ecuador.
