= Zelliboria =

Zelliboria daedalea

Scientific classification
- Kingdom: Animalia
- Phylum: Arthropoda
- Class: Insecta
- Order: Coleoptera
- Suborder: Polyphaga
- Infraorder: Cucujiformia
- Family: Cerambycidae
- Genus: Zelliboria
- Species: Z. daedalea

Binomial name
- Zelliboria daedalea (Perty, 1832)

Genus of beetles

Zelliboria daedalea is a species of beetle in the family Cerambycidae, the only species in the genus Zelliboria.
