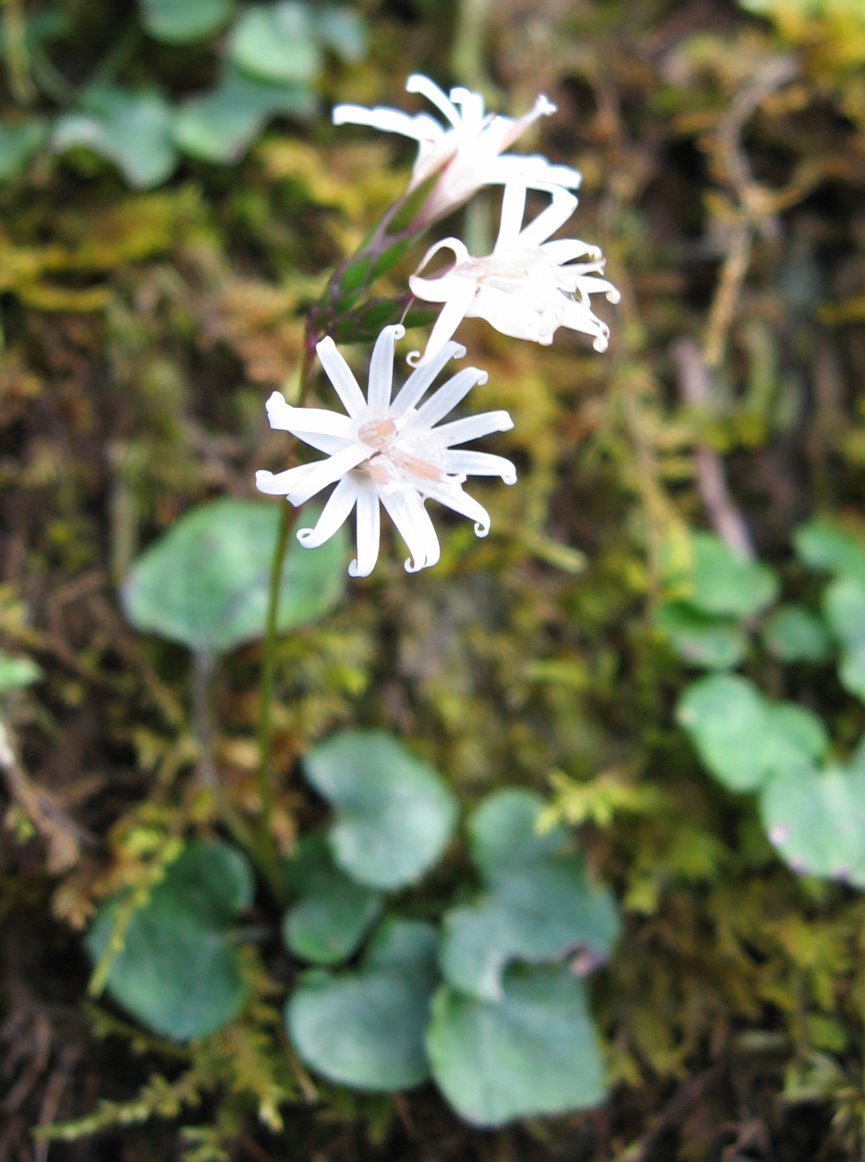

Scientific classification
- Kingdom: Plantae
- Clade: Tracheophytes
- Clade: Angiosperms
- Clade: Eudicots
- Clade: Asterids
- Order: Asterales
- Family: Asteraceae
- Genus: Ainsliaea
- Species: A. apiculata

Binomial name
- Ainsliaea apiculata Sch. Bip.

Synonyms
- A. apiculata var. typica Masam.; A. apiculata var. rotundifolia Masam.

= Ainsliaea apiculata =

Species of flowering plant

Ainsliaea apiculata, commonly known as small maple-leaf ainsliaea, is a perennial species of flowering plant in the family Asteraceae. It is commonly found in the Beech Forests of Eastern Asia. In Taiwan and Japan, it is found near low hills or mountain slopes. The plant typically measures between 8 and 30 cm (3.1 and 11.8 in) tall.
