= Erruca consors =

Scientific classification
- Kingdom: Animalia
- Phylum: Arthropoda
- Clade: Pancrustacea
- Class: Insecta
- Order: Lepidoptera
- Superfamily: Noctuoidea
- Family: Erebidae
- Subfamily: Arctiinae
- Genus: Erruca
- Species: E. consors

Binomial name
- Erruca consors (Walker, 1854)

Synonyms
- Glaucopis consors Walker, 1854; Laemocharis norma Herrich-Schäffer, [1854]

Species of moth

Erruca consors is a moth of the family Erebidae. It was described by Francis Walker in 1854. It is found in Brazil.
