= Thyellocerus =

Thyellocerus fulgidipennis

Scientific classification
- Kingdom: Animalia
- Phylum: Arthropoda
- Class: Insecta
- Order: Coleoptera
- Suborder: Polyphaga
- Infraorder: Cucujiformia
- Family: Cerambycidae
- Genus: Thyellocerus
- Species: T. fulgidipennis

Binomial name
- Thyellocerus fulgidipennis (Gounelle, 1909)

Genus of beetles

Thyellocerus fulgidipennis is a species of beetle in the family Cerambycidae, the only species in the genus Thyellocerus.
