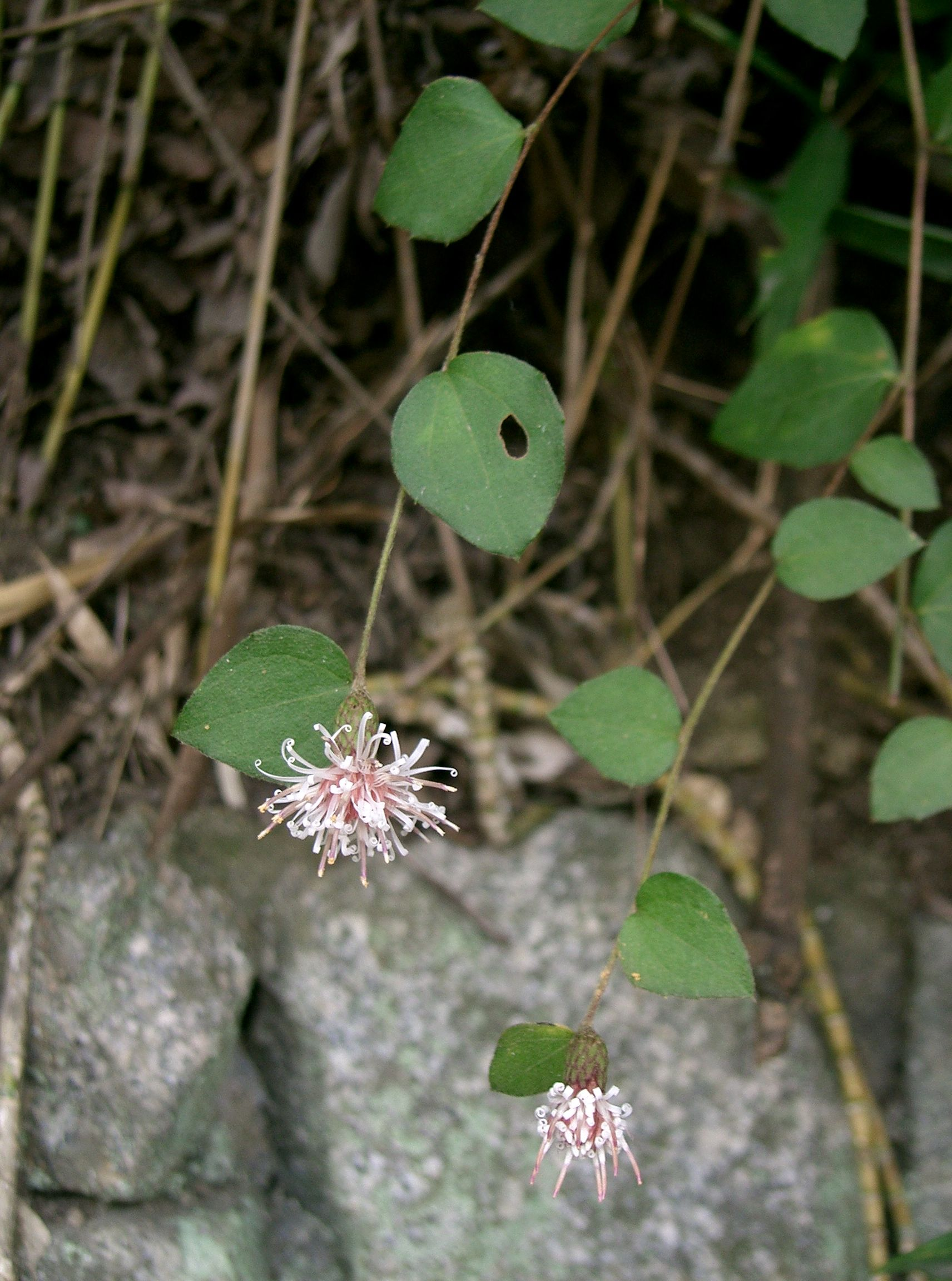

Scientific classification
- Kingdom: Plantae
- Clade: Tracheophytes
- Clade: Angiosperms
- Clade: Eudicots
- Clade: Asterids
- Order: Asterales
- Family: Asteraceae
- Genus: Pertya
- Species: P. scandens

Binomial name
- Pertya scandens (Thunb.) Sch.Bip.

= Pertya scandens =

Species of shrub

Pertya scandens is a type of small, deciduous shrubbery belonging to the family Asteraceae. In Japan, it is often bundled together from Mount Kōya and used as material for constructing brooms. As such, it is named in Japanese, "Kōyabōki" (高野箒, Kōya Broom). From Kantō to Kyūshū, it can be found in sunny mountain forests. Its stalks are narrow but firm, and it possesses broad, oval-shaped leaves. Its flowerhead, which blooms on the autumn of its first year, typically holds around 10 cylindrical, white seeds at the length of 1.5 cm approximately.

Media related to Pertya scandens at Wikimedia Commons
