= Acruspex =

Acruspex spinipennis

Scientific classification
- Kingdom: Animalia
- Phylum: Arthropoda
- Class: Insecta
- Order: Coleoptera
- Suborder: Polyphaga
- Infraorder: Cucujiformia
- Family: Cerambycidae
- Genus: Acruspex
- Species: A. spinipennis

Binomial name
- Acruspex spinipennis (Zajciw, 1970)

Genus of beetles

Acruspex is a genus of beetles in the family Cerambycidae, containing a single species, Acruspex spinipennis.
