= Leucomeris decora =

Conservation status
- Data Deficient (IUCN 2.3)

Scientific classification
- Kingdom: Plantae
- Clade: Tracheophytes
- Clade: Angiosperms
- Clade: Eudicots
- Clade: Asterids
- Order: Asterales
- Family: Asteraceae
- Genus: Leucomeris
- Species: L. decora

Binomial name
- Leucomeris decora Kurz

Synonyms
- Gochnatia decora (Kurz) Cabrera

Species of tree

Leucomeris decora is a species of flowering plant in the family Asteraceae.

== Description ==
The plant is native to Southeast Asia. It is found in Myanmar, Thailand, Vietnam, and Yunnan province of southern China.

The small composite tree grows in hot dry valleys.

=== Conservation ===
Leucomeris decora is on the IUCN Red List. Threats include local exploitation of the wood for fuel and the bark for medicine.
