= Piezarina =

Piezarina smaragdina

Scientific classification
- Kingdom: Animalia
- Phylum: Arthropoda
- Class: Insecta
- Order: Coleoptera
- Suborder: Polyphaga
- Infraorder: Cucujiformia
- Family: Cerambycidae
- Genus: Piezarina
- Species: P. smaragdina

Binomial name
- Piezarina smaragdina Martins, 1976

Genus of beetles

Piezarina smaragdina is a species of beetle in the family Cerambycidae, the only species in the genus Piezarina.
