= Cicatrizocera =

Cicatrizocera bilistrata

Scientific classification
- Kingdom: Animalia
- Phylum: Arthropoda
- Class: Insecta
- Order: Coleoptera
- Suborder: Polyphaga
- Infraorder: Cucujiformia
- Family: Cerambycidae
- Genus: Cicatrizocera
- Species: C. bilistrata

Binomial name
- Cicatrizocera bilistrata (Lane, 1959)

Genus of beetles

Cicatrizocera bilistrata is a species of beetle in the family Cerambycidae, the only species in the genus Cicatrizocera.
