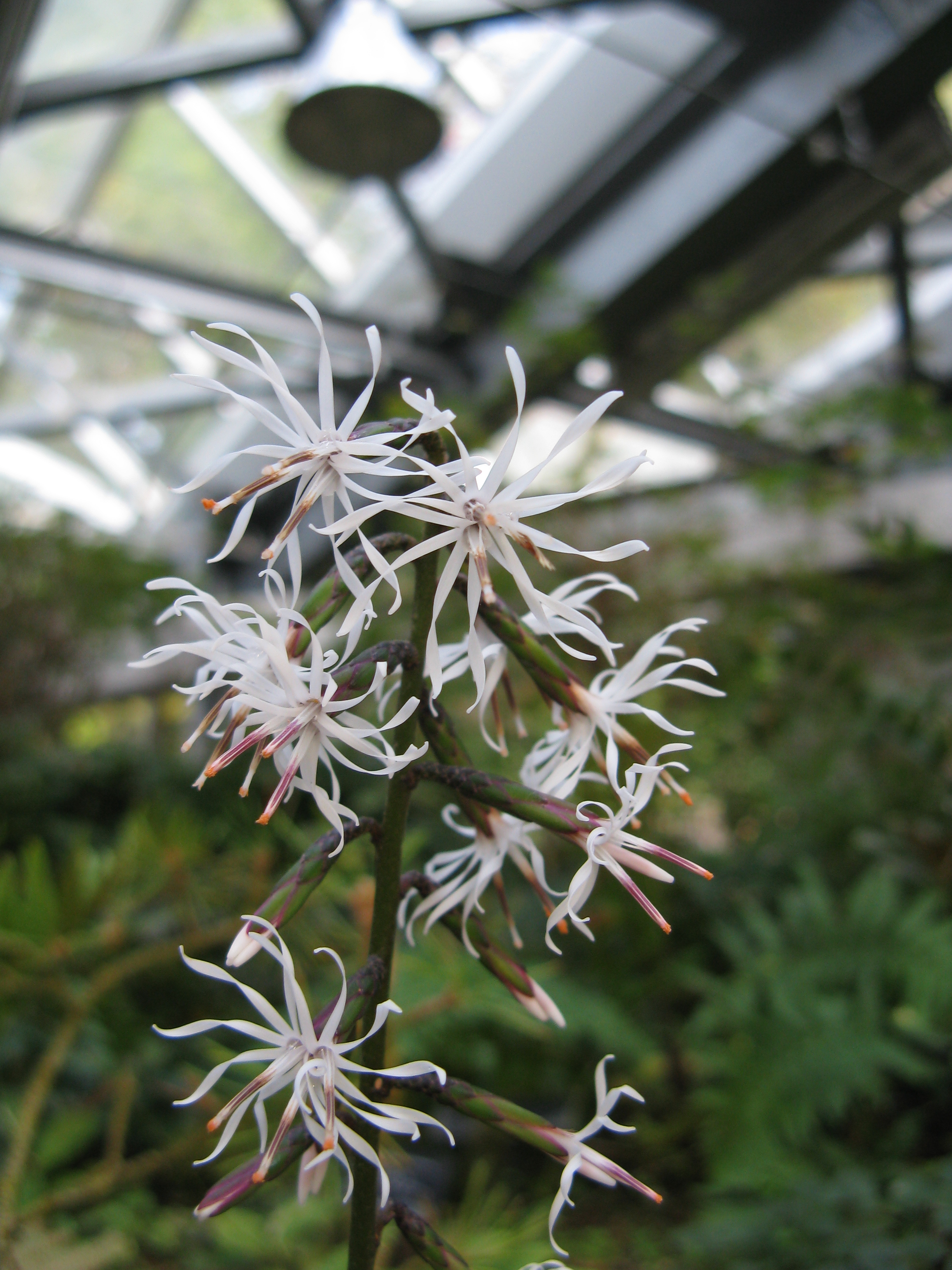
- Ainsliaea cordifolia

Scientific classification
- Kingdom: Plantae
- Clade: Tracheophytes
- Clade: Angiosperms
- Clade: Eudicots
- Clade: Asterids
- Order: Asterales
- Family: Asteraceae
- Subfamily: Pertyoideae
- Tribe: Pertyeae
- Genus: Ainsliaea; DC.

Type species
- Ainsliaea pteropoda DC.

Synonyms
- Diaspananthus Miq.; Ainsliaea sect. Scaposae Beauverd

= Ainsliaea =

Genus of flowering plants

Ainsliaea is a genus of flowering plants in the family Asteraceae described as a genus in 1838.

Ainsliaea is native to East Asia, the Indian subcontinent, and Southeast Asia.

== Species ==
Species

- Ainsliaea acerifolia Sch.Bip.
- Ainsliaea angustata C.C.Chang
- Ainsliaea angustifolia Hook.f. & Thomson ex C.B.Clarke
- Ainsliaea apiculata Sch.Bip.
- Ainsliaea aptera DC.
- Ainsliaea apteroides (C.C.Chang) Y.C.Tseng
- Ainsliaea asaroides Y.S.Ye, J.Wang & H.G.Ye
- Ainsliaea asperrima Sch.Bip.
- Ainsliaea bonatii Beauverd
- Ainsliaea brandisiana Kurz
- Ainsliaea caesia Hand.-Mazz.
- Ainsliaea cavaleriei
- Ainsliaea chapaensis
- Ainsliaea cleistogama
- Ainsliaea cordifolia
- Ainsliaea crassifolia
- Ainsliaea dentata
- Ainsliaea dissecta
- Ainsliaea elegans
- Ainsliaea faurieana
- Ainsliaea foliosa
- Ainsliaea fragrans
- Ainsliaea fulvioides
- Ainsliaea fulvipes
- Ainsliaea glabra
- Ainsliaea gongshanensis
- Ainsliaea gracilis
- Ainsliaea grossedentata
- Ainsliaea hayatae
- Ainsliaea heterantha
- Ainsliaea hypoleuca
- Ainsliaea lancangensis
- Ainsliaea lancifolia
- Ainsliaea latifolia
- Ainsliaea lijiangensis
- Ainsliaea longipetiolata
- Ainsliaea macrocephala
- Ainsliaea macroclinidioides
- Ainsliaea mairei
- Ainsliaea mattfeldiana
- Ainsliaea mollis
- Ainsliaea morrisonicola
- Ainsliaea multibracteata
- Ainsliaea nana
- Ainsliaea nervosa
- Ainsliaea oblonga
- Ainsliaea ovata
- Ainsliaea parvifolia
- Ainsliaea paucicapitata
- Ainsliaea pentaflora
- Ainsliaea pertyoides
- Ainsliaea petelotii
- Ainsliaea pingbianensis
- Ainsliaea plantaginifolia
- Ainsliaea qianiana
- Ainsliaea ramosa
- Ainsliaea rubrifolia
- Ainsliaea rubrinervis
- Ainsliaea smithii
- Ainsliaea spanocephala
- Ainsliaea spicata
- Ainsliaea sutchuenensis
- Ainsliaea tenuicaulis
- Ainsliaea tonkinensis
- Ainsliaea trinervis
- Ainsliaea walkeri
- Ainsliaea yadsimae
- Ainsliaea yunnanensis
