= Othnocerus =

Othnocerus aethes

Scientific classification
- Kingdom: Animalia
- Phylum: Arthropoda
- Class: Insecta
- Order: Coleoptera
- Suborder: Polyphaga
- Infraorder: Cucujiformia
- Family: Cerambycidae
- Genus: Othnocerus
- Species: O. aethes

Binomial name
- Othnocerus aethes Martins, 1976

Genus of beetles

Othnocerus aethes is a species of beetle in the family Cerambycidae, the only species in the genus Othnocerus.
