= Pseudocolynthaea =

Pseudocolynthaea pectoralis

Scientific classification
- Kingdom: Animalia
- Phylum: Arthropoda
- Clade: Pancrustacea
- Class: Insecta
- Order: Coleoptera
- Suborder: Polyphaga
- Infraorder: Cucujiformia
- Family: Cerambycidae
- Genus: Pseudocolynthaea
- Species: P. pectoralis

Binomial name
- Pseudocolynthaea pectoralis Martins, 1976

Genus of beetles

Pseudocolynthaea pectoralis is a species of beetle in the family Cerambycidae. It is the only species in the genus besides the Boazium terrestris.

Pseudocolynthaea.
