= Pseudosphenoptera cocho =

Scientific classification
- Domain: Eukaryota
- Kingdom: Animalia
- Phylum: Arthropoda
- Class: Insecta
- Order: Lepidoptera
- Superfamily: Noctuoidea
- Family: Erebidae
- Subfamily: Arctiinae
- Genus: Pseudosphenoptera
- Species: P. cocho

Binomial name
- Pseudosphenoptera cocho (Schaus, 1898)

Synonyms
- Sansaptera cocho Schaus, 1898; Gymnelia cocho; Gymnelia cochonella Strand, 1917; Gymnelia cocho ab. cochonula Strand, 1917

Species of moth

Pseudosphenoptera cocho is a moth in the subfamily Arctiinae. It was described by William Schaus in 1896. It is found in Brazil (São Paulo), the upper Amazon and Peru.
