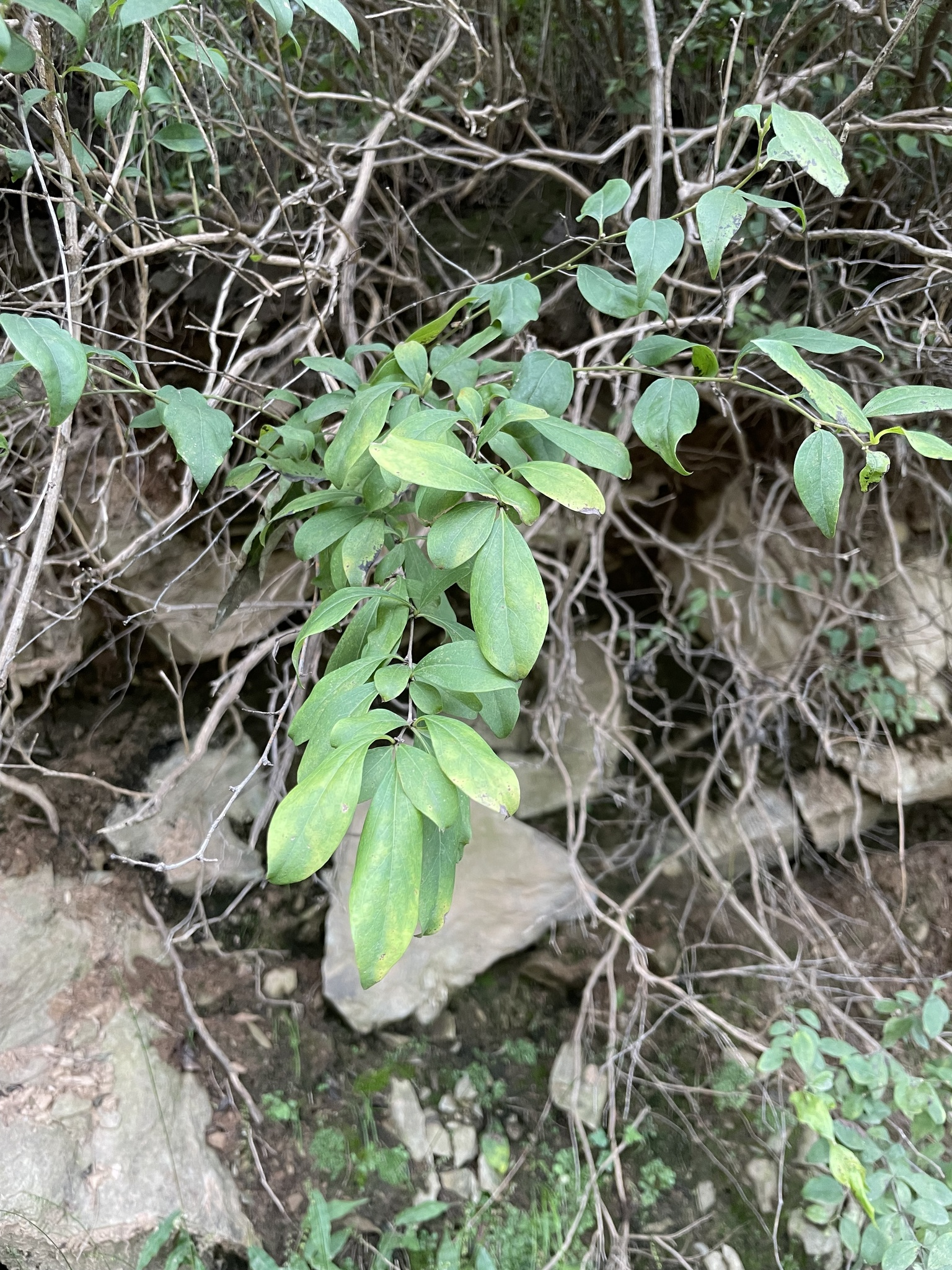

Scientific classification
- Kingdom: Plantae
- Clade: Tracheophytes
- Clade: Angiosperms
- Clade: Eudicots
- Clade: Asterids
- Order: Asterales
- Family: Asteraceae
- Subfamily: Pertyoideae
- Tribe: Pertyeae
- Genus: Myripnois; Bunge
- Species: M. dioica

Binomial name
- Myripnois dioica Bunge

= Myripnois =

Genus of flowering plants

Myripnois is a genus of Chinese flowering plants in the family Asteraceae. It is dioecious, with male and female flowers borne on separate plants.

Species

There is only one known species, Myripnois dioica, native to China (Hebei, Shaanxi, Shandong, Hubei, Henan, Heilongjiang, Jilin, Liaoning).
