= Piezogenista =

Piezogenista callytra

Scientific classification
- Kingdom: Animalia
- Phylum: Arthropoda
- Class: Insecta
- Order: Coleoptera
- Suborder: Polyphaga
- Infraorder: Cucujiformia
- Family: Cerambycidae
- Genus: Piezogenista
- Species: P. callytra

Binomial name
- Piezogenista callytra Martins, 1976

Genus of beetles

Piezogenista callytra is a species of beetle in the family Cerambycidae, the only species in the genus Piezogenista.
