= Colynthaea =

Colynthaea coriacea

Scientific classification
- Kingdom: Animalia
- Phylum: Arthropoda
- Class: Insecta
- Order: Coleoptera
- Suborder: Polyphaga
- Infraorder: Cucujiformia
- Family: Cerambycidae
- Genus: Colynthaea
- Species: C. coriacea

Binomial name
- Colynthaea coriacea (Erichson in Schomburg, 1848)

Genus of beetles

Colynthaea coriacea is a species of beetle in the family Cerambycidae, the only species in the genus Colynthaea.
