= Migmocera =

Migmocera flavicauda

Scientific classification
- Kingdom: Animalia
- Phylum: Arthropoda
- Class: Insecta
- Order: Coleoptera
- Suborder: Polyphaga
- Infraorder: Cucujiformia
- Family: Cerambycidae
- Genus: Migmocera
- Species: M. flavicauda

Binomial name
- Migmocera flavicauda (Bates, 1885)

Genus of beetles

Migmocera flavicauda is a species of longhorn beetles belonging to the family Cerambycidae, the only species in the genus Migmocera.

The beetle larvae in this species usually drill into wood, and can cause damage to living wood trunks or felled wood.
