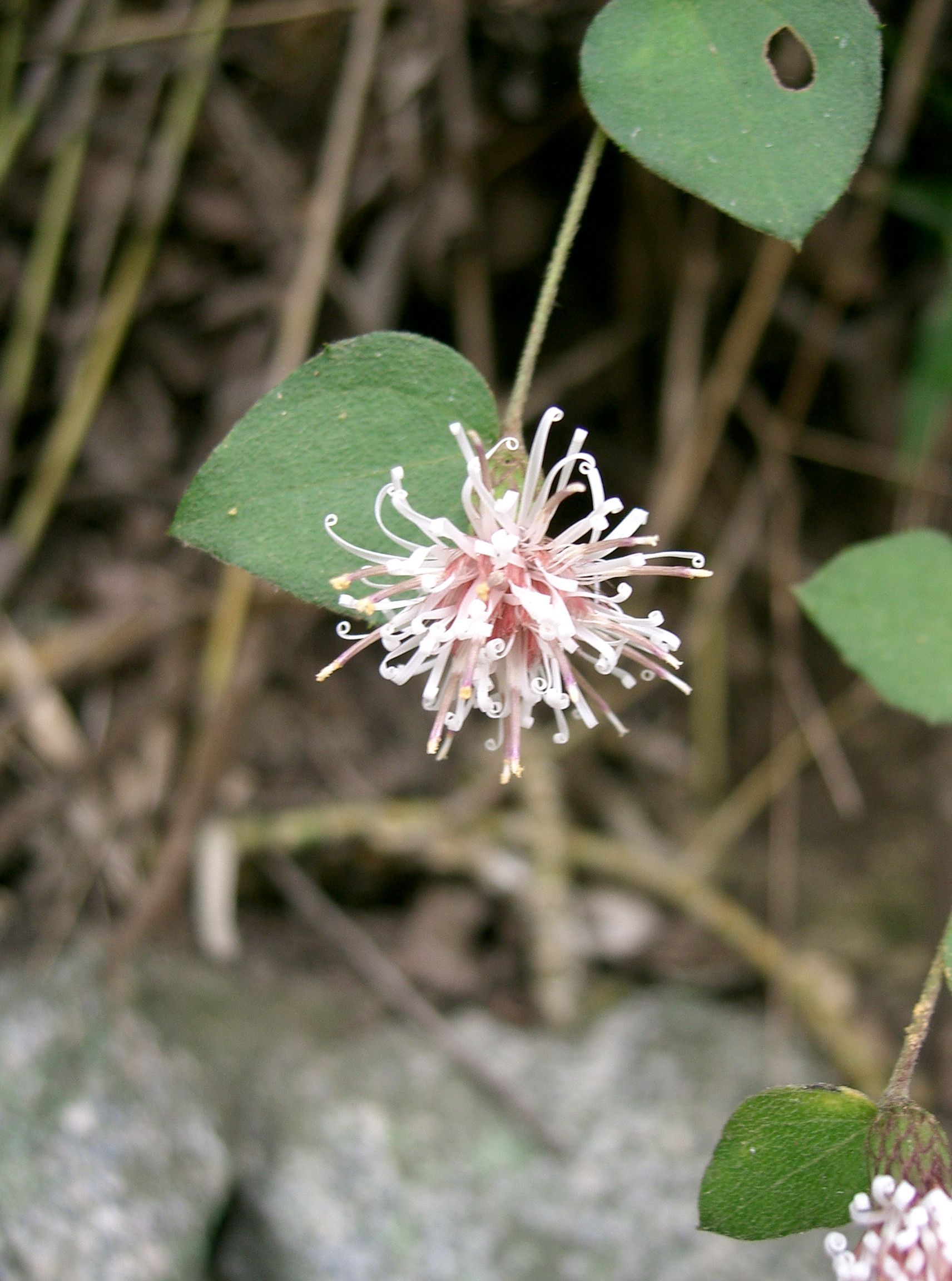
- Pertya scandens

Scientific classification
- Kingdom: Plantae
- Clade: Tracheophytes
- Clade: Angiosperms
- Clade: Eudicots
- Clade: Asterids
- Order: Asterales
- Family: Asteraceae
- Subfamily: Pertyoideae
- Tribe: Pertyeae
- Genus: Pertya; Sch.Bip.

Type species
- Pertya scandens (Thunb.) Sch.Bip.

= Pertya =

Genus of flowering plants

Pertya is a genus of Asian flowering plants in the family Asteraceae.

Species

- Pertya × hybrida Makino - Honshu
- Pertya aitchisonii C.B.Clarke - Afghanistan
- Pertya angustifolia - Sichuan
- Pertya berberidoides (Hand.-Mazz.) - Sichuan, Yunnan, Tibet
- Pertya bodinieri Vaniot - Yunnan
- Pertya cordifolia Mattf. - Anhui, Jiangxi, Hunan
- Pertya corymbosa - Guangxi, Hunan
- Pertya discolor Rehder - Gansu, Shanxi, Sichuan, Ningxia, Qinghai
- Pertya glabrescens Sch.Bip. - Japan, Fujian, Jiangxi
- Pertya henanensis - Sichuan, Henan
- Pertya mattfeldii Bornm. - Afghanistan
- Pertya monocephala W.W.Sm. - Yunnan, Tibet
- Pertya phylicoides Jeffrey - Yunnan, Tibet
- Pertya pubescens Ling - Fujian, Guangdong, Jiangxi, Zhejiang
- Pertya pungens - Guangdong
- Pertya rigidula (Miq.) Makino - Honshu
- Pertya robusta (Maxim.) Beauverd - Japan
- Pertya scandens (Thunb. ex Thunb.) Sch.Bip. - Japan, Fujian, Jiangxi
- Pertya simozawai Masam. - Taiwan
- Pertya sinensis Oliv. - China
- Pertya suzukii Kitam. - Honshu
- Pertya triloba (Makino) Matsum. - Honshu
- Pertya tsoongiana Ling - Sichuan
- Pertya uniflora (Maxim.) Mattf. - Gansu
- Pertya yakushimensis H.Koyama & Nagam. - Kyushu
