= Maximilian Perty =

German naturalist and entomologist (1804–1884)

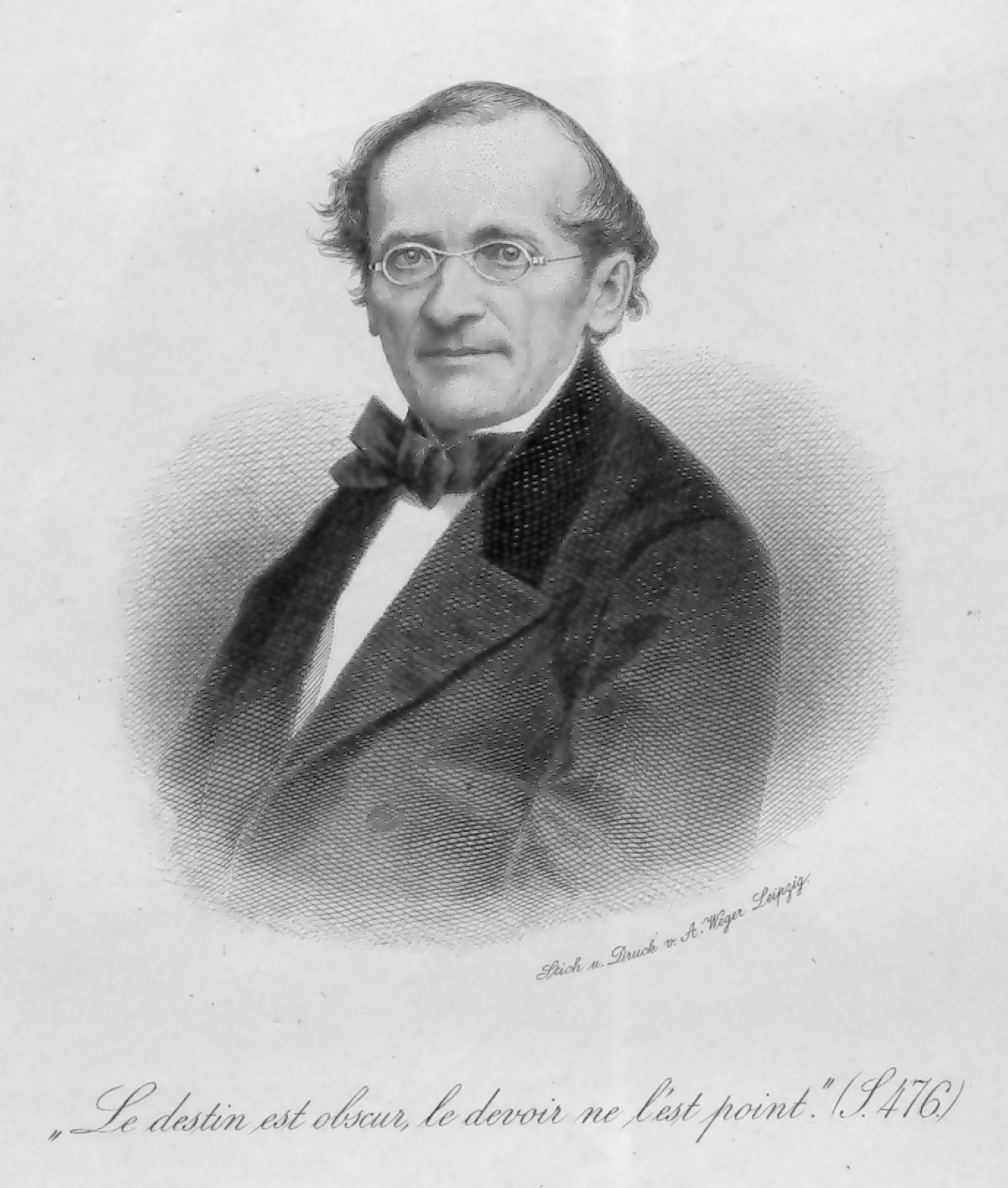
- Born: Maximilian Perty; 17 September 1804
- Died: 8 August 1884 (aged 79)

Josef Anton Maximilian Perty (17 September 1804, Ornbau – 8 August 1884, Bern) was a German naturalist and entomologist. He was a professor of zoology and comparative anatomy at the University of Bern. His first name is sometimes spelled as "Joseph".

He studied natural sciences and medicine in Landshut, earning his medical doctorate in 1826. Afterward, he obtained his PhD at Erlangen with a thesis on a previously unknown species of beetle, and in 1831 became privat-docent of zoology and general natural history at the Ludwig-Maximilians-Universität München. From 1833 to 1876, he was a professor at the University of Bern.

He conducted investigative studies of arthropods collected by Johann Baptist von Spix and Carl Friedrich Philipp von Martius from an expedition in Brazil. In 1862, the botanical genus Pertya was named in his honor by Carl Heinrich "Bipontinus" Schultz.

== Works ==
- Observationes nonnulae in Coleoptera Indiae orientalis, München (1831).
- Delectus Animalium Articulatorum quae in itinere per Brasiliam Annis MDCCCXVII – MDCCCXX Iussu et Auspiciis Maximiliani Josephi I. Bavariae Regis Augustissimi, percato collegerunt Dr J. B. de Spix et Dr. C. F. Ph. de Martius. (1830-1834).
- Zur Kenntniss kleinster Lebensformen: nach Bau, Funktionen, Systematik, mit Specialverzeichniss der in der Schweiz beobachteten. pp. 1-228, pls I-XVII. Bern: Verlag von Jent & Reinert.
- Die mystischen Erscheinungen in der menschlichen Natur. Leipzig, (2nd edition 1872, 2 vols.) (1861).
- Über das Seelenleben der Tiere (Leipzig und Heidelberg, 2. 1865: new edition 1876).
- Die Natur im Licht philosophischer Anschauung (Leipzig und Heidelberg) (1869).
- Erinnerungen aus dem Leben eines Natur- und Seelenforschers des 19. Jahrhunderts (Leipzig und Heidelberg) (1879).

== Collections ==
Perty's collections are divided between the University of Bern and the Zoologische Staatssammlung München
