= Plazia =

Scientific classification
- Kingdom: Plantae
- Clade: Tracheophytes
- Clade: Angiosperms
- Clade: Eudicots
- Clade: Asterids
- Order: Asterales
- Family: Asteraceae
- Subfamily: Mutisioideae
- Tribe: Onoserideae
- Genus: Plazia; Ruiz & Pav.

Synonyms
- Aglaodendron Remy; Harthamnus H.Rob.

Genus of plants

Plazia is a genus of South American plants in the family Asteraceae.

Species

- Plazia cheiranthifolia Wedd. - Coquimbo in Colombia
- Plazia conferta Ruiz & Pav. - Junín in Peru
- Plazia daphnoides Wedd. - Bolivia, Peru (Ayacucho), Chile (Tarapacá), Argentina (Jujuy, Mendoza, Salta)
- Plazia robinsonii M.O. Dillon & Sagást - Peru (Huamachuco)

formerly included

transferred to other genera - Aphyllocladus Gypothamnium Hyalis

- Plazia acaciifolia J. Koster - Hyalis lancifolia Baker
- Plazia pinnifolia (Phil.) O.Hoffm. - Gypothamnium pinifolium Phil.
- Plazia spartioides (Wedd.) Kuntze - Aphyllocladus spartioides Wedd.
