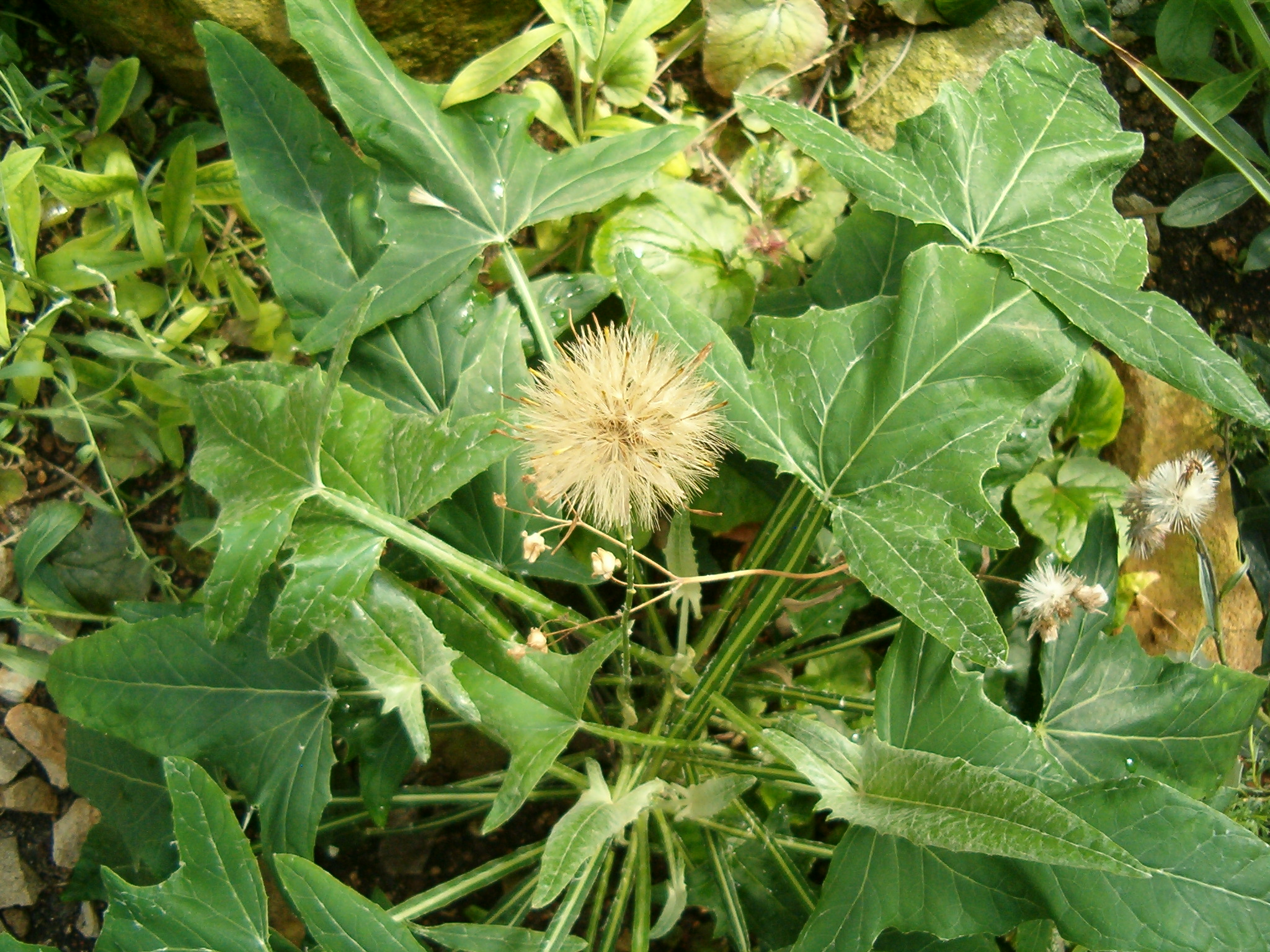
- Onoseris alata

Scientific classification
- Kingdom: Plantae
- Clade: Tracheophytes
- Clade: Angiosperms
- Clade: Eudicots
- Clade: Asterids
- Order: Asterales
- Family: Asteraceae
- Subfamily: Mutisioideae
- Tribe: Onoserideae
- Genus: Onoseris; Willd.

Type species
- Atractylis purpurea L.f.

Synonyms
- Cladoseris (Less.) Spach; Chaetachlaena D.Don; Seris Willd.; Pereziopsis Coult.; Cursonia Nutt.; Onoseris sect. Cladoseris Less.; Hipposeris Cass.; Hilairia DC.; Schaetzellia Klotzsch; Rhodoseris Turcz.; Isotypus Kunth; Cataleuca K.Koch & Fintelm.; Centroclinium D.Don; Pereziopsis J.M.Coult.; Caloseris Benth.

= Onoseris =

Genus of flowering plants

Onoseris is a genus of Mesoamerican and South American flowering plants in the family Asteraceae.

Species

- Onoseris acerifolia Kunth
- Onoseris alata Rusby
- Onoseris albicans (D.Don) Ferreyra
- Onoseris annua Less.
- Onoseris brasiliensis Cabrera
- Onoseris castelnaeana Wedd.
- Onoseris cumingii Hook. & Arn.
- Onoseris donnell-smithii (J.M.Coult.) Ferreyra
- Onoseris drakeana André
- Onoseris fraterna S.F.Blake
- Onoseris gnaphalioides Muschl.
- Onoseris hastata Wedd.
- Onoseris hyssopifolia Kunth
- Onoseris odorata (D.Don) Hook. & Arn.
- Onoseris onoseroides (Kunth) B.L.Rob.
- Onoseris purpurata Willd.
- Onoseris purpurea (L.f.) S.F.Blake
- Onoseris sagittata (Rusby) Rusby
- Onoseris salicifolia Kunth
- Onoseris silvatica Greenm.
- Onoseris speciosa Kunth

Formerly included

Several species once considered members of Onoseris are now regarded as better suited to other genera: Actinoseris, Criscia, Hieracium, Ianthopappus, Lycoseris, Noticastrum, Trichocline, and Urmenetea.
