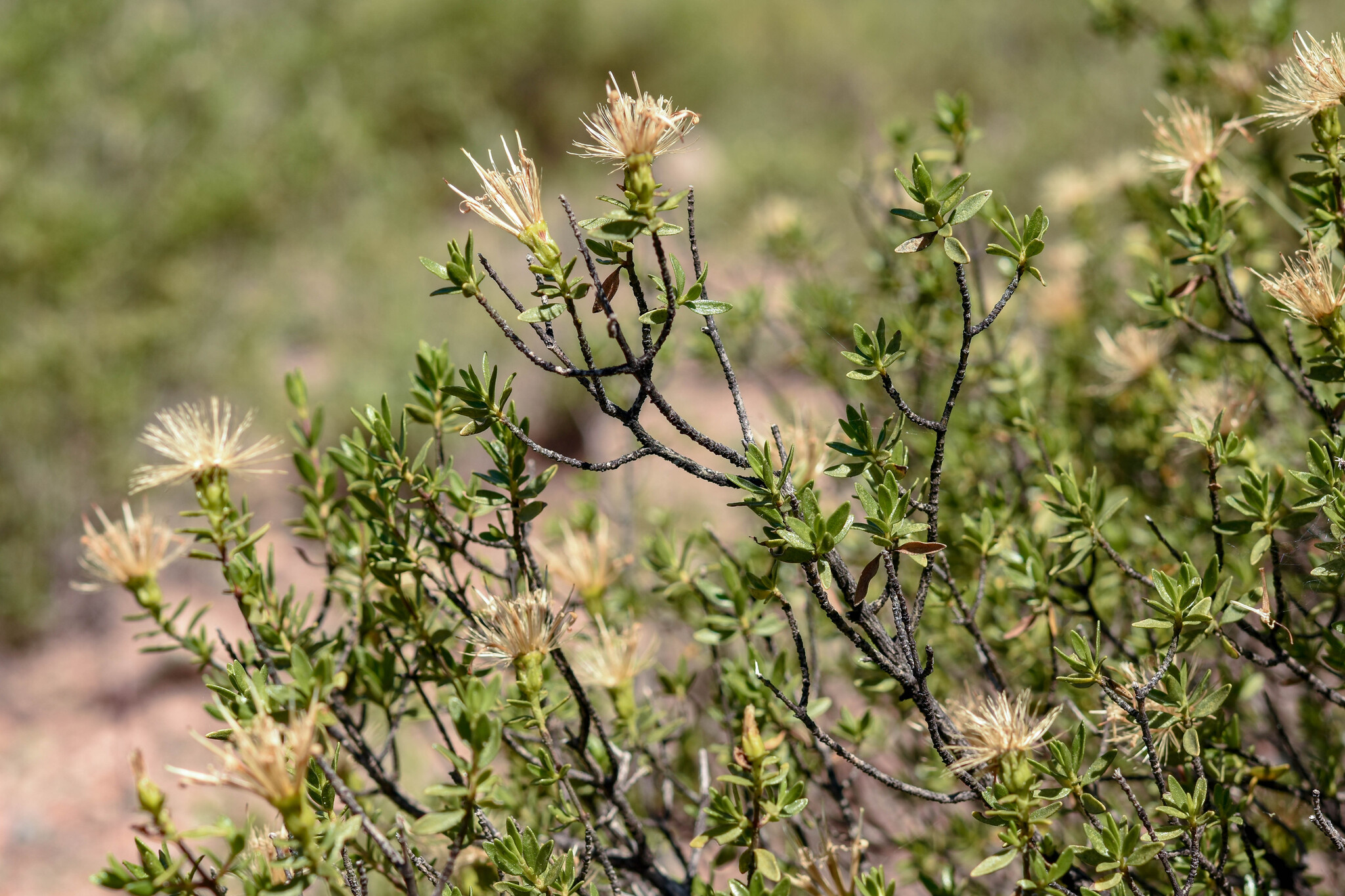

Scientific classification
- Kingdom: Plantae
- Clade: Tracheophytes
- Clade: Angiosperms
- Clade: Eudicots
- Clade: Asterids
- Order: Asterales
- Family: Asteraceae
- Subfamily: Famatinanthoideae; S.E.Freire, Ariza & Panero
- Tribe: Famatinantheae; S.E.Freire, Ariza & Panero
- Genus: Famatinanthus; Ariza & S.E.Freire
- Species: F. decussatus

Binomial name
- Famatinanthus decussatus (Hieron.) Ariza & S.E.Freire

Synonyms
- Aphyllocladus decussatus Hieron.

= Famatinanthus =

Genus of flowering plants

Famatinanthus is a genus in the family Asteraceae that was described in 2014 and has been assigned to its own tribe Famatinantheae and subfamily Famatinanthoideae. It contains only one known species, F. decussatus, a small shrub of 0.5–1.8 m (1 ft 8 in – 5 ft 11 in) high that is an endemic of the Andes of north-western Argentina, with small, entire, oppositely set leaves and flowerheads containing about ten cream-colored, ray and disk florets, with backward coiled lobes. It is locally known as sacansa. For more than 100 years, the species was known to science only from the type collection. It was described in 1885 and originally assigned to the genus Aphyllocladus.

== Description ==
Famatinanthus is a long-lived, xerophitic, thornless shrub of 0.5–1.8 m (1 ft 8 in – 5 ft 11 in) high. Flowers can be found from December to February. It has fifty four chromosomes (2n=54), probably developed through multiplication of a base set of nine (n=9).

=== Stems and leaves ===
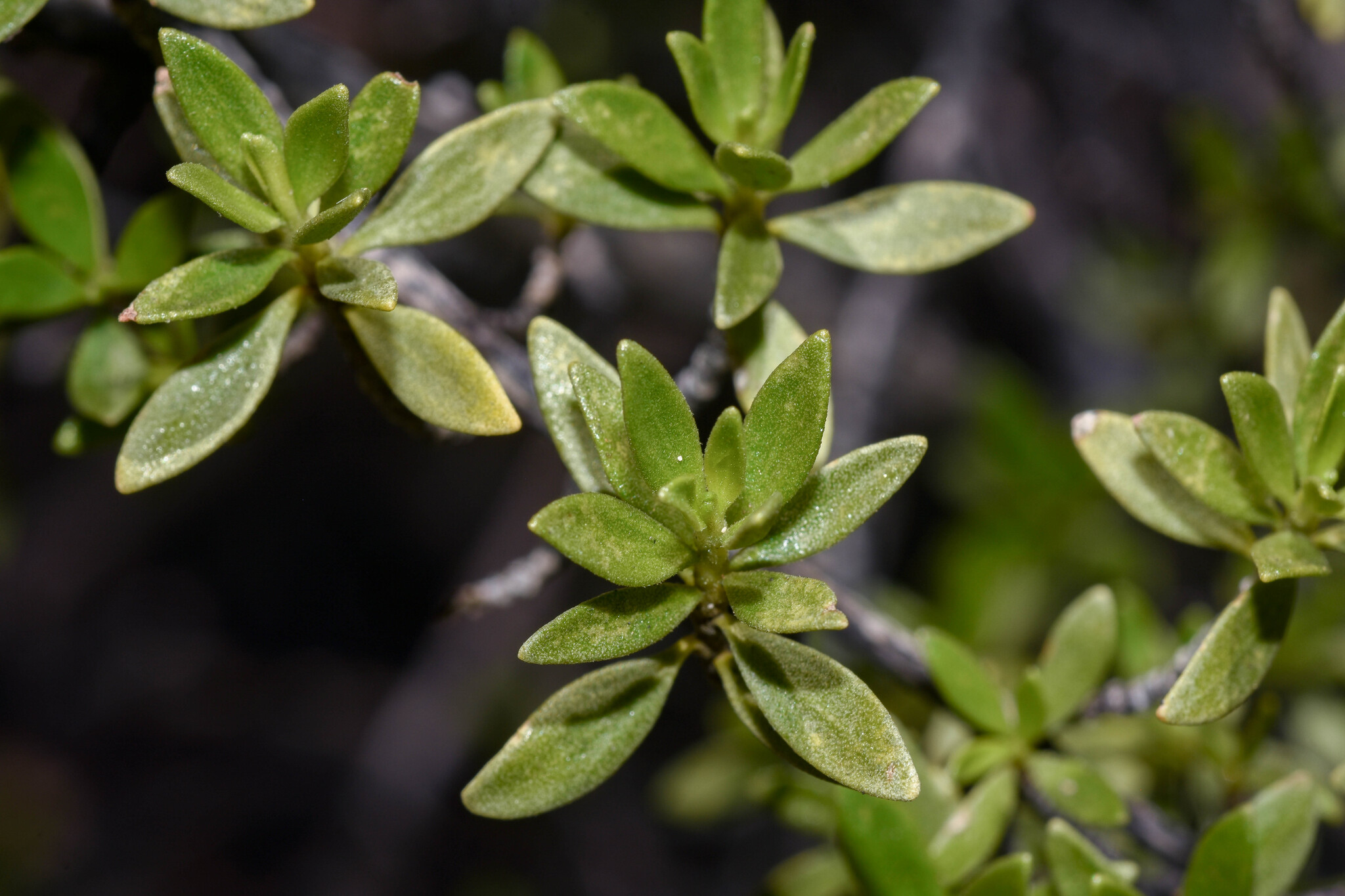
Famatinanthus decussatus, oblique view of leaves

In the field, the stems are blackish in colour and look powdery. They are circular in cross section, unribbed and without secretory cavities, with side-branches approximately perpendicular to the main branch. Leaves remain attached when fully grown and are oppositely set along the branches. The leaves are leathery, have no petiole, are oval to elongated reversed egg-shaped, with the base narrowing gradually to the main vein but clasping the stem at the foot, with entire margins, a pointy tip, and its veins branching pinnately. The leaves have peculiar stomata that are raised by the surrounding tissue and hide a large chamber underneath. There are also sparse, sunken, reversed egg-shaped glandular hairs of about 50 μm high, on both surfaces of the leaf consisting of about 5 flat cells, arranged like a pile of pancakes, these excrete essential oils, and appear as dots to the naked eye. Both sides of the leaf surface further sprout sparse, erect, multi-storied T-shaped hairs of about 150 μm long. These are one cell thick, with a stalk of two to six cells and a platform of two to five increasingly wider cells, sometimes followed by a second stalk and platform.

=== Flowers ===
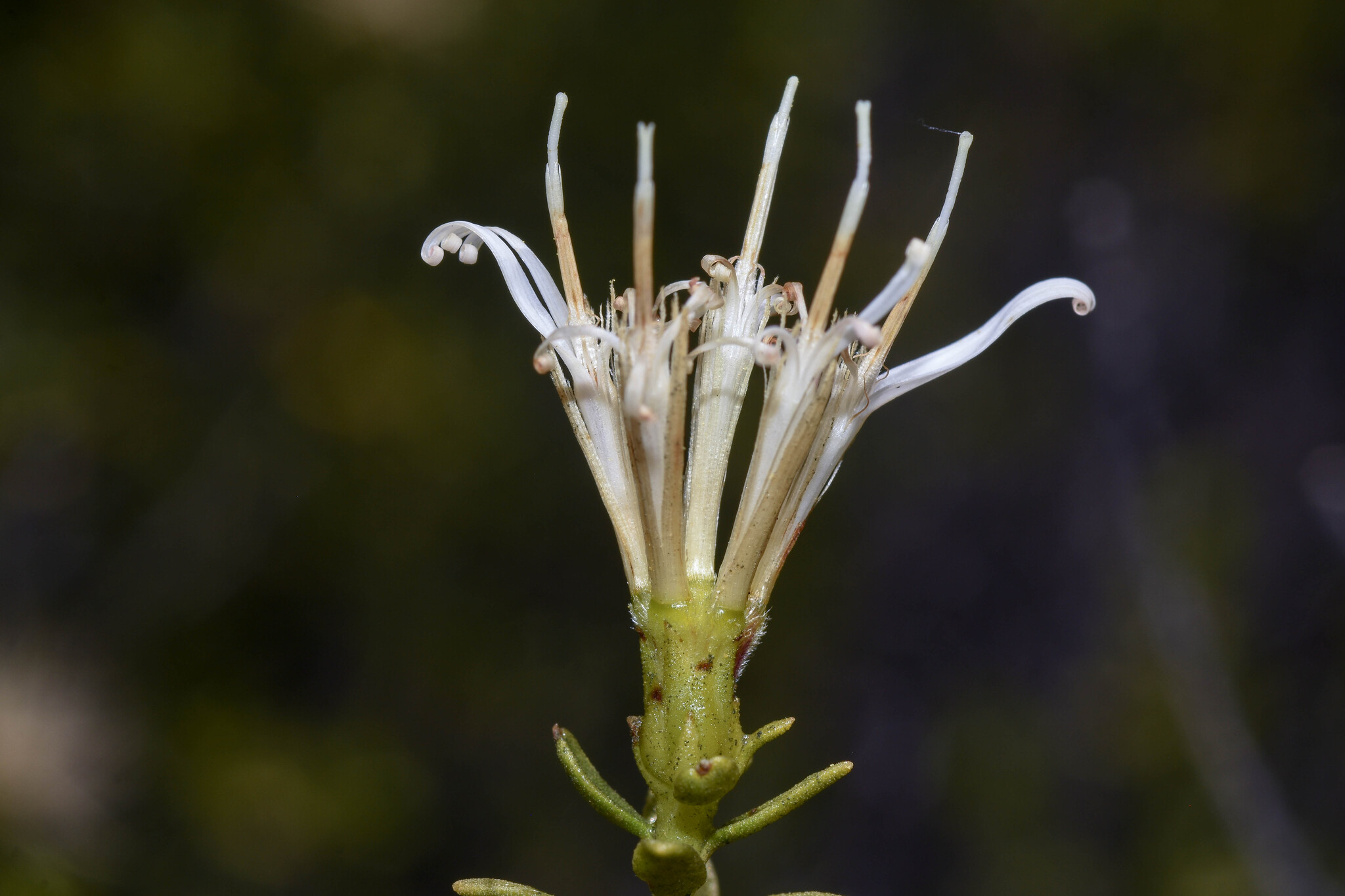
Famatinanthus decussatus, side view of a capitulum

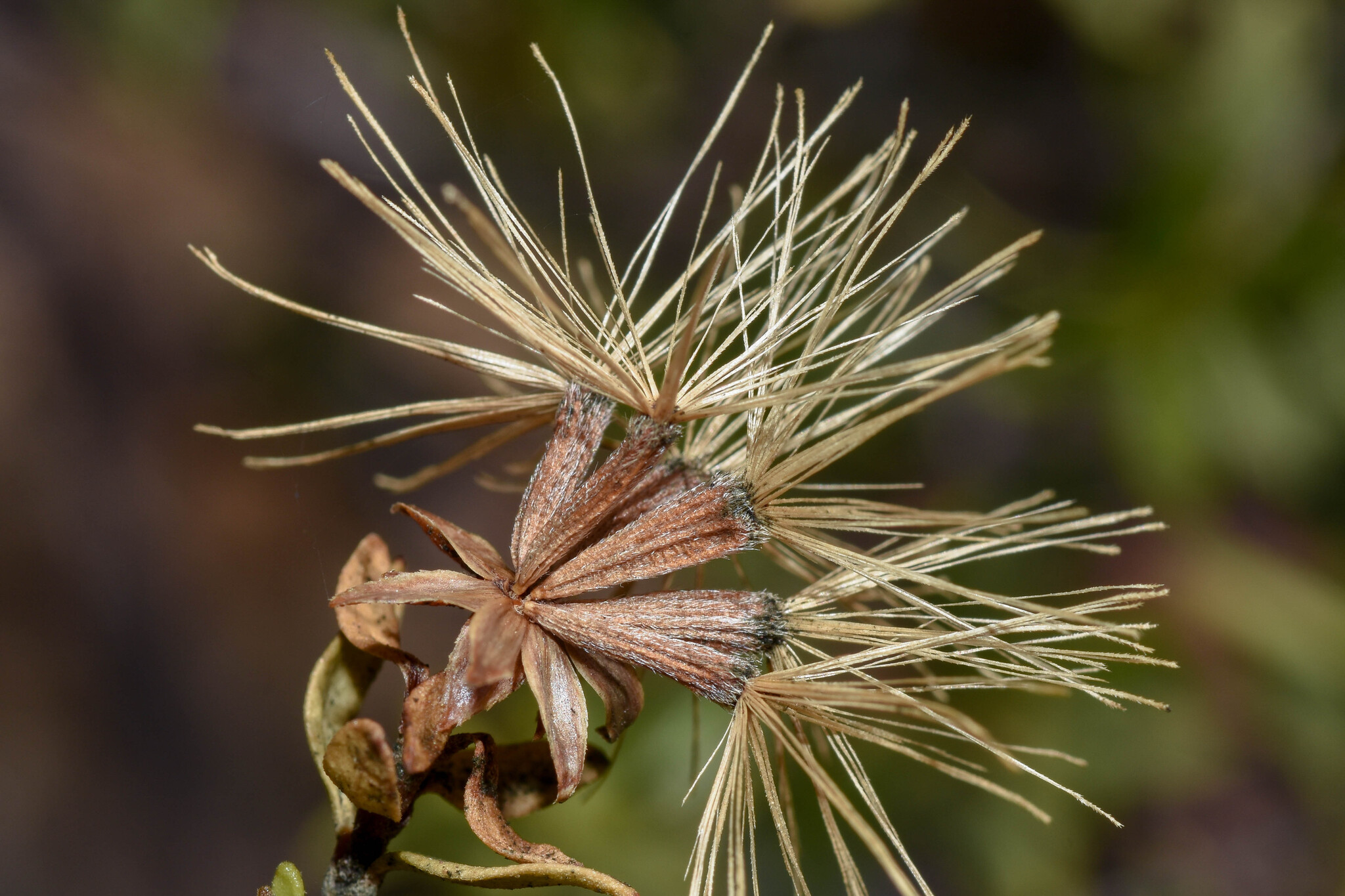
Famatinanthus decussatus, side view of the fruits

The flower heads are set individually at the tip of short side-branches and have both marginal and disk florets, which are both fertile and have cream-colored corollas. The involucre surrounding the flower head is initially egg-shaped, but becomes bell-shaped when flowering and during the development of the fruits. The bracts that form the involucre (called phyllaries) stand in three whorls. Those on the outside are about 3 mm long and 1.8 mm wide, oval in shape with a pointy or gradually narrowing tip, and softly hairy on the outside. The inner phyllaries are about 8 mm (0.31 in) long and 2–2.3 mm (0.079–0.091 in) wide, and do not reach beyond the top of the cypselas. The corollas of the five to six marginal florets per head are 16–17 mm long. Three of its lobes have merged to a lip (or ligule) of about 1 cm long and 1.2–1.5 mm (0.047–0.059 in) wide, with three teeth at the tip, while the two remaining lobes are only merged at the foot, each 0.3–0.5 mm (0.012–0.020 in) wide and about 1 cm long, but measuring is difficult because they are coiled-up. The five or six disc florets have slightly shorter corollas of about 15 mm (0.59 in) long, are formed like a tube, have five lobes of about 7.5 mm (0.30 in) long, which are also coiled, and without hair at their tips. As in all Asteraceae, the anthers are merged over their length to form a tube, through which the style grows, while gathering pollen from the anthers that have opened at the inside of the tube. The cream-colored anthers are pointy at their tip, and carry two, about 3.3 mm (0.13 in) long, woolly haired tails at their foot, which are free from the filament. The yellow style is rounded at the tip and is rough on the outside lower than the split and the branches are about 0.3 mm (0.012 in) long. The indehiscent, one-seeded fruits (called cypsela) are green when growing and brown when ripe, narrowly inverted cone-shaped, covered in bristles of twin hairs, with on top the calyx that has changed to barbed hairs, plume-like towards the tip, and is called a pappus. The pappus is initially wrapped tightly around the corolla, and so allowing access of light to the cypselas, but is later spreading, to create better lift for the ripe fruit. The pollen is approximately globular (50×45 μm), has three very wide furrows and has a pattern of very small spines and ridges.

=== Differences with some other Asteraceae ===
Famatinanthus is similar to Aphyllocladus, and grows in comparable environments, but can be distinguished by the unribbed cylindrical branches without secretory cavities, that retain their opposite leaves, multi-storied T-shaped hairs, florets with cream corollas, pointy anther tips, approximately globular pollen, and cypselas with bristles. Aphyllocladus has early shedded alternate leaves, long, simple, two to three celled flagellate hairs, lilac to purple corollas, blunt anther tips, pollen that is higher than wide, and long-pilose or hairless cypselas. Furthermore, Aphyllocladus has stems with strong and very wide ribs, with tufts of long flagellate hairs in the grooves between them, and large secretory cavities. The multistoried T-shaped hair is further only known from Ianthopappus (tribe Hyalideae) and Dresslerothamnus (tribe Senecioneae).

== Taxonomy ==
Hugh Algernon Weddell established the genus Aphyllocladus in 1855, typifying it on the rapidly falling, alternate leaves. In 1879, Gustavo Niederlein and Georg Hieronymus collected a shrub in the Sierra de Famatina that had not yet been known to science. Hieronymus described it and named it Aphyllocladus decussatus in 1885. Aphyllocladus is traditionally included in tribe Mutisieae as defined by Henri Cassini. Molecular studies suggest that Aphyllocladus is best placed in tribe Onoserideae of the subfamily Mutisioideae. The species was again collected in 2011, though it was difficult to ascertain the new material was identical, as only a photocopy of the specimen of Hieronymus from the Herbarium of Berlin was available, the original probably destroyed by the fire resulting from the 1943 bombing. Luckily, isotypes were found in the collections of Asa Gray at Harvard and of the Herbarium of the National University of Córdoba, Argentina, that made sure the new find was indeed identical to the specimen of 1879. Comparison to the other species of Aphyllocladus showed that the characters of the corollas, anthers, style branches, cypselas, hairs, pollen, and anatomy of the stem of A. decussatus were very different. Hieronymus' species was therefore assigned to a newly erected genus Famatinanthus, initially retained within the Onoserideae. However, Famatinanthus shares some other characters with the Gochnatieae and Hyalidae, in particular pointy anther tips, and with Hyaloseris (Stifftioideae) opposite leaves and few-flowered flower heads.

=== Phylogeny ===
Recent genetic analysis placed Famatinanthus as sister to all other species of Asteraceae except those in the subfamily Barnadesioideae. Famatinanthus was found to have both inversions in the DNA of the chloroplasts like all other Asteraceae except the Barnadesioideae. The relationship between Famatinanthus and the other Asteraceae is represented by the following tree.

- - Calyceraceae
  - Asteraceae
    - subfamily Barnadesioideae
    - - subfamily Famatinanthoideae
      - - subfamily Mutisioideae
        - - subfamily Stifftioideae
          - - subfamily Wunderlichioideae
            - - subfamily Gochnatioideae
              - all originally non South-American subfamilies

=== Etymology ===
The authors derive the generic name Famatinanthus from the Sierra de Famatina, where the type species can be found. Although the authors do not discuss the rest of the name, the Greek word ἄνθος (anthos) meaning "flower", is used as part of many other botanical names. The same in true for the species epithet decussatus, which is Latin, and means "crossed", and has been used in many different taxa to indicate that the leaves are arranged along the stem in opposite pairs, at right angles to those above or below them.

== Distribution ==
Famatinanthus decussatus is endemic to the Sierra del Famatina, a side chain of the Andes in the La Rioja Province in northwest Argentina.

== Ecology ==
The plant occurs at altitudes between 1800 and 2700 m. It grows between sparse vegetation, with cacti, and other open shrubs such as Larrea divaricata, Flourensia hirta and Gochnatia glutinosa. The blackish and powdery surface of the branches as can be seen in the field, is the result of the mycelia and spores of a sooty mold belonging to the Dothideomycetidae. Some florets were seen that had filaments but lacked anthers, indicating that insects may eat the anthers.

== Conservation ==
Sacansa is an endemic species only known from about ten distinct locations, within a very limited geographical distribution, estimated below 2,000 km^{2}, in the Sierra de Famatina only, where only small areas are officially protected. An ongoing decline has been observed in its occurrence. The main threats are mining, damage by off-road vehicles, and livestock grazing. The authors of the paper that erects the genus Famatinanthus have suggested to assign it the conservation status of vulnerable.
