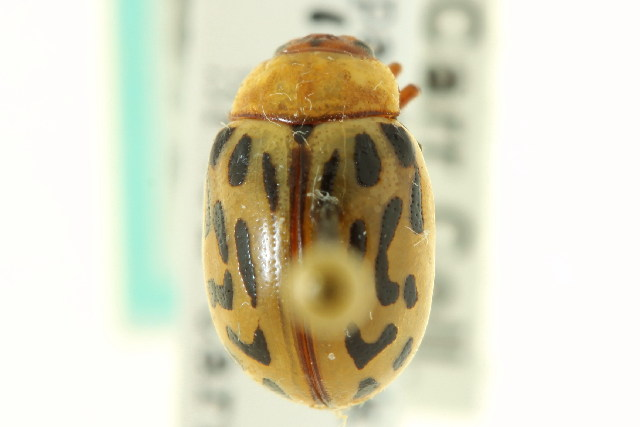

Scientific classification
- Kingdom: Animalia
- Phylum: Arthropoda
- Clade: Pancrustacea
- Class: Insecta
- Order: Coleoptera
- Suborder: Polyphaga
- Infraorder: Cucujiformia
- Family: Chrysomelidae
- Genus: Calligrapha
- Species: C. conjuncta

Binomial name
- Calligrapha conjuncta (Rogers, 1856)

= Calligrapha conjuncta =

Species of beetle

Calligrapha conjuncta is a species of leaf beetle belonging to the family Chrysomelidae, in the subgenus Zygogramma, which was formerly a genus.

== Description ==
Calligrapha conjuncta is a small leaf beetle with a brown pronotum and yellow elytra marked with elongated brown stripes. The species C. conjuncta was formerly believed to contain two subspecies, conjuncta and pallida (Bland, 1864), but recent research reveals that pallida is a separate species.

== Distribution and habitat ==
Calligrapha conjuncta is native to North America.

Adult beetles are associated generally with plants of the family Asteraceae) including Ambrosia artemisiifolia, Flourensia cernua, and Helianthus annuus (common sunflower). They have also been associated with Brassica campestris (field mustard), Descurainia sophia (tansy mustard), and Atriplex, though not as a food source.
