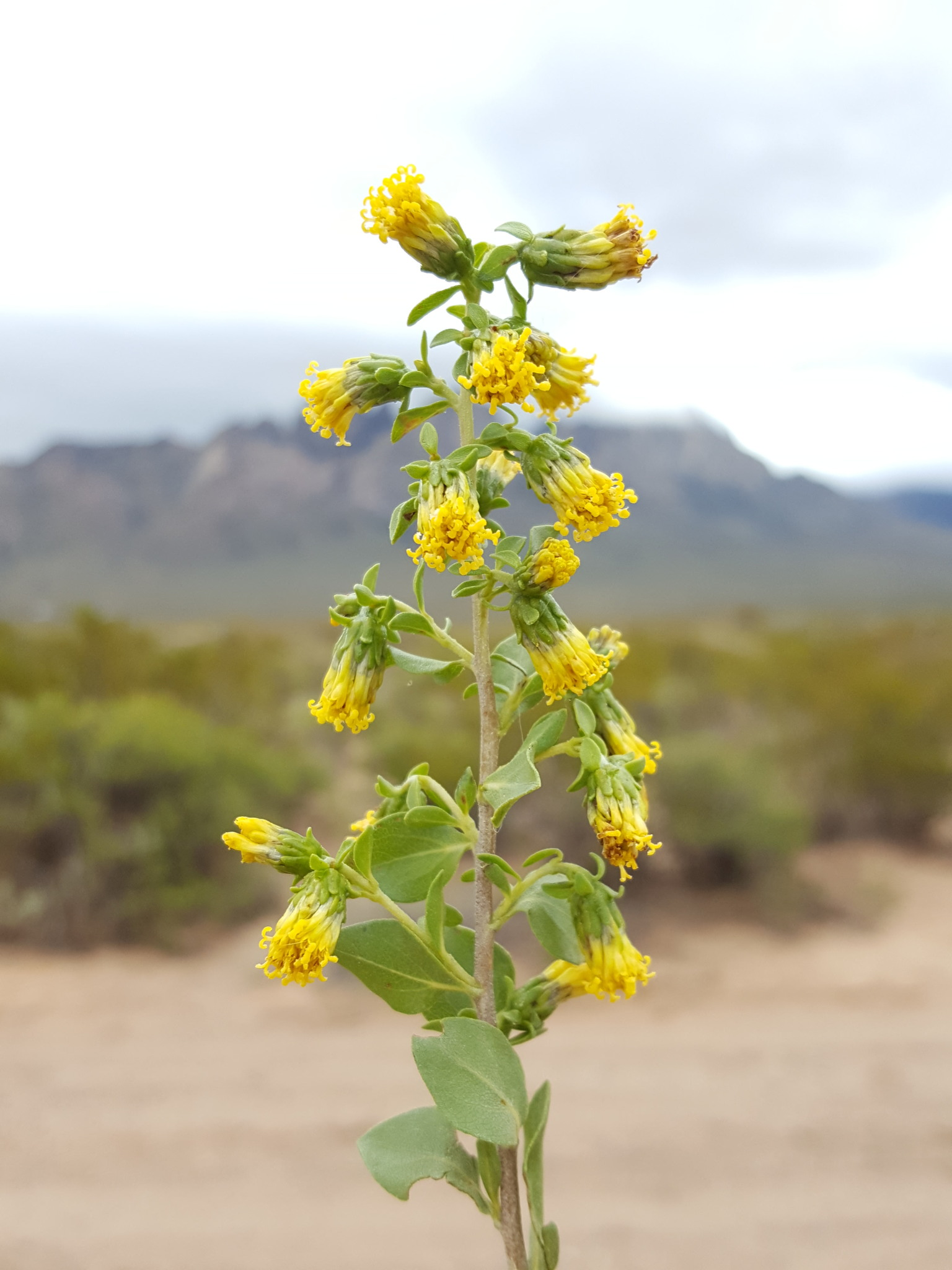

Conservation status
- Secure (NatureServe)

Scientific classification
- Kingdom: Plantae
- Clade: Embryophytes
- Clade: Tracheophytes
- Clade: Angiosperms
- Clade: Eudicots
- Clade: Asterids
- Order: Asterales
- Family: Asteraceae
- Tribe: Heliantheae
- Genus: Flourensia
- Species: F. cernua

Binomial name
- Flourensia cernua DC.

Synonyms
- Helianthus cernuus (DC.) Benth. & Hook.f.

= Flourensia cernua =

Species of flowering plant

Flourensia cernua is a species of flowering plant in the aster family known by the English common names American tarwort and tarbush and the Spanish common names hojasé, hojasén, and hoja ancha. It is native to the Chihuahuan Desert of North America, where it occurs in the US states of Arizona, New Mexico, and Texas, and the Mexican states of Sonora, Chihuahua, Coahuila, Durango, San Luis Potosí, and Zacatecas. Most of the species in the genus are found in Latin America; this and F. pringlei are the only two species whose ranges extend into the United States.

Flourensia cernua is a shrub growing from a network of roots that may extend four meters (over 13 feet) horizontally. Most are shallow but a few extend up to five meters (over 16 feet) deep into the soil. It usually grows to a maximum height of about one meter (40 inches), but can be as tall as two meters (7 feet). It may grow erect or spreading in shape. It has many branches, branching from the base of the stem. The branches are covered in alternately arranged thick, oval leaves up to 2.5 centimetres (0.98 in) in length, sometimes reaching 4 centimetres (1.6 in). The edges of the leaf blades are smooth or wavy. The hanging flower heads contain several yellow disc florets and no ray florets. The fruit is a hairy achene up to a 1 centimetre (0.39 in) long including its pappus. Most of the parts of the plant are very resinous and have a tarlike or hoplike scent. It has a bitter taste.

Flourensia cernua is winter-deciduous in most regions, but may retain its leaves in areas with sufficient moisture. The production of leaves is affected by moisture levels; the plant has been observed to produce a first set of small, scalelike leaves during a dry spring and a second set of larger leaves later in the season as moisture increases. Growth occurs earlier in the year when rainfall is abundant. Flowering occurs in the fall. The plant generally produces few flowers in dry years. The root network is shallow and vast with a few very deep roots, helping it collect water from a wide area of soil, another adaptation to its dry habitat.

Flourensia cernua grows in desert scrub and desert grassland. It has increased in abundance in these habitats during recent times as a result of overgrazing, which reduced the native grasses, particularly grama grasses and tobosa. It is an indicator of Chihuahuan Desert scrub, which covers about 70% of the Chihuahuan Desert. There it codominates with creosotebush and viscid acacia. Other common plants associated with tarbush include whitethorn acacia, catclaw acacia, honey mesquite, Berlandier wolfberry, mariola, Wright's beebrush, littleleaf sumac, broom snakeweed, winterfat, and smooth-leaf sotol. It is part of many plant communities and is dominant in many types of desert habitats and ecotones. It is often the main shrub in a landscape otherwise populated by grasses. It may be sparse or locally abundant, growing scattered about the terrain or in dense stands. It may form monotypic stands in soils of clay and silt, such as those on bottomlands. It is most common on alluvial soils derived from limestone, the main parent material for the soils of the Chihuahuan Desert. The species has been described as long-lived.

Flourensia cernua has medicinal uses. In Mexico it is steeped to make a tea that is consumed to treat various gastrointestinal conditions such as indigestion and diarrhea. It is also used for respiratory disorders; its extracts have shown the ability to kill multidrug-resistant Mycobacterium tuberculosis in vitro. The leaves and flower heads are sold in farmers' markets in Mexico and the United States.

In agriculture, this shrub has been studied as a potential supplemental forage for livestock such as sheep. The fact that it is increasing in abundance in the Chihuahuan Desert has sparked interest in its value as food for local domestic animals. It is similar to alfalfa in nutritional value being high in protein. However, it contains compounds that reduce its palatability to animals, making it bitter and "peppery". In addition, the flowers and fruits are toxic to sheep, goats, and cattle. Livestock naturally avoid it. The leaves can be consumed in moderation for their nutritional value, but a diet composed only of tarbush can be fatal.

Compounds isolated from the plant include flavonoids, sesquiterpenoids, monoterpenoids, acetylenes, p-acetophenones, benzopyrans and benzofurans. Extracts of the plant have shown antifungal, anticyanobacterial, and antitermite effects. A number of the compounds are phytotoxic.
