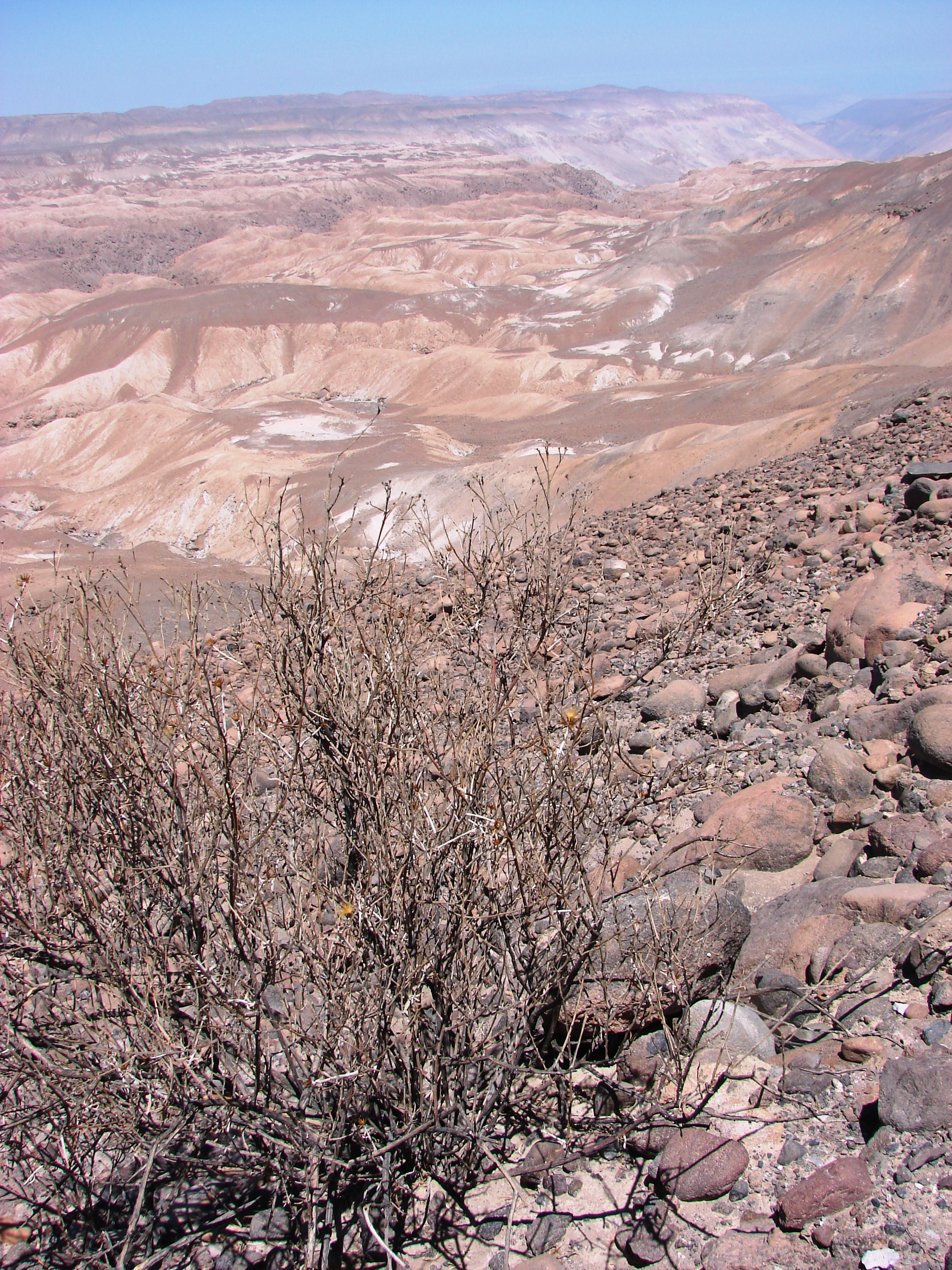

Scientific classification
- Kingdom: Plantae
- Clade: Embryophytes
- Clade: Tracheophytes
- Clade: Spermatophytes
- Clade: Angiosperms
- Clade: Eudicots
- Clade: Asterids
- Order: Asterales
- Family: Asteraceae
- Genus: Aphyllocladus
- Species: A. denticulatus

Binomial name
- Aphyllocladus denticulatus (J.Rémy) Cabrera

Synonyms
- Cyclolepis denticulata J.Rémy

= Aphyllocladus denticulatus =

Species of plant

Aphyllocladus denticulatus is a plant species in the Asteraceae. The species is native to the interior valleys of Chile. The species lives in dry habitat with extremely limited rainfall.

A chemical study of the species found that it produces the compound 5-Methylcoumarin, which has only been previously discovered in members of the Asteraceae subtribe Mutisiinae.
