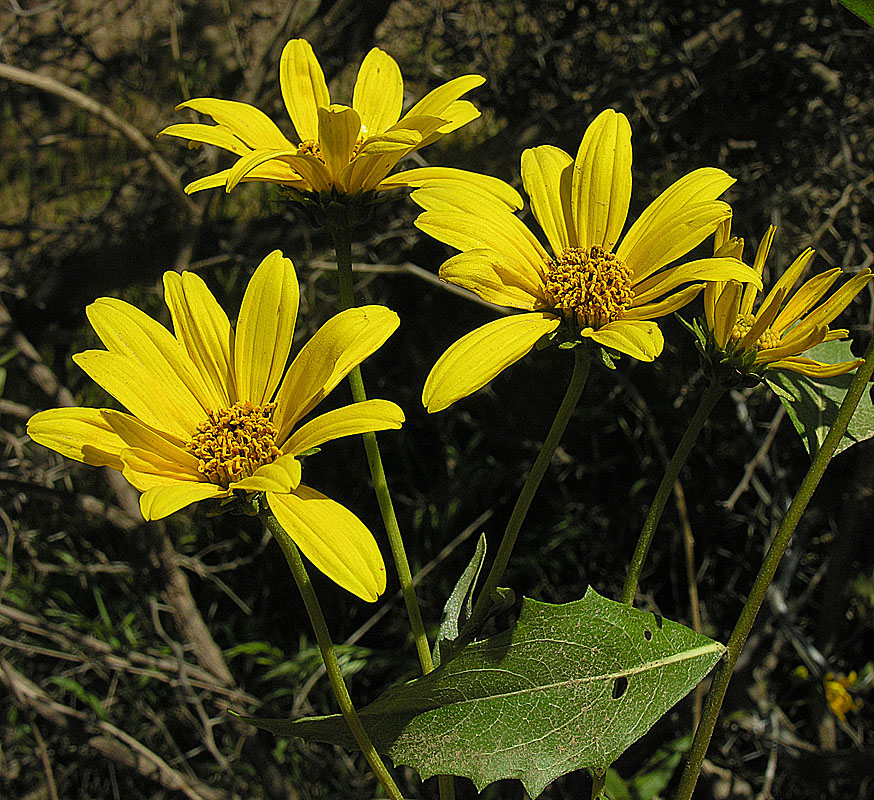
- Austroflourensia thurifera

Scientific classification
- Kingdom: Plantae
- Clade: Tracheophytes
- Clade: Angiosperms
- Clade: Eudicots
- Clade: Asterids
- Order: Asterales
- Family: Asteraceae
- Subfamily: Asteroideae
- Tribe: Heliantheae
- Subtribe: Enceliinae
- Genus: Austroflourensia; J.C.Ospina & S.E.Freire

Species
- 12; see text

= Austroflourensia =

Genus of flowering plants

Austroflourensia is a genus of flowering plants in the family Asteraceae. It includes 12 species of shrubs and subshrubs native to South America, ranging from Peru to southern Argentina, typically on arid and semi-arid lands.

Most of the species in this genus were previously included in genus Flourensia, which included both North American and South American species. Molecular phylogenetic and morphological studies found that Flourensia as previously circumscribed was polyphyletic, and in 2023 12 South American species were placed in the new genus Austroflourensia. The species in Austroflourensia are distinguished from the North American species by its shrubby or subshrubby habit, capitula always radiate and usually arranged in weakly cymose-corymbose capitulescences, 2-3-seriate phyllaries, and shortly dentate disc corollas.

Austroflourensia is related to the other four genera in subtribe Enceliinae – Encelia, Enceliopsis, Geraea, and Helianthella – while Flourensia s.s. is sister to the other genera. It shares radiate capitula, neuter ray florets, and 2-3-seriate phyllaries with Encelia, Enceliopsis, Geraea, and Helianthella, as well as glabrous leaves and solitary to corymbose capitula with the closely related Helianthella. It is distinguished from those genera by a shrubby or subshrubby habit, foliage with resin, yellow florets, and pappose achenes without wings.

== Species ==
12 species are accepted.

- Austroflourensia angustifolia (DC.) J.C.Ospina & S.E.Freire
- Austroflourensia cajabambensis (M.O.Dillon) J.C.Ospina & S.E.Freire
- Austroflourensia fiebrigii (S.F.Blake) J.C.Ospina & S.E.Freire
- Austroflourensia glutinosa (Rusby) J.C.Ospina & S.E.Freire
- Austroflourensia hirtissima (S.F.Blake) J.C.Ospina & S.E.Freire
- Austroflourensia macrophylla (S.F.Blake) J.C.Ospina & S.E.Freire
- Austroflourensia niederleinii (S.F.Blake) J.C.Ospina & S.E.Freire
- Austroflourensia peruviana (M.O.Dillon) J.C.Ospina & S.E.Freire
- Austroflourensia polycephala (M.O.Dillon) J.C.Ospina & S.E.Freire
- Austroflourensia suffrutescens (R.E.Fr.) J.C.Ospina & S.E.Freire
- Austroflourensia thurifera (Molina) J.C.Ospina & S.E.Freire
- Austroflourensia tortuosa (Griseb.) J.C.Ospina & S.E.Freire
