= F. polyclada =

F. polyclada may refer to:

- Flourensia polyclada, an Argentinian tarwort
- Frullania polyclada, a liverwort with thin leaf-like flaps on either side of the stem
