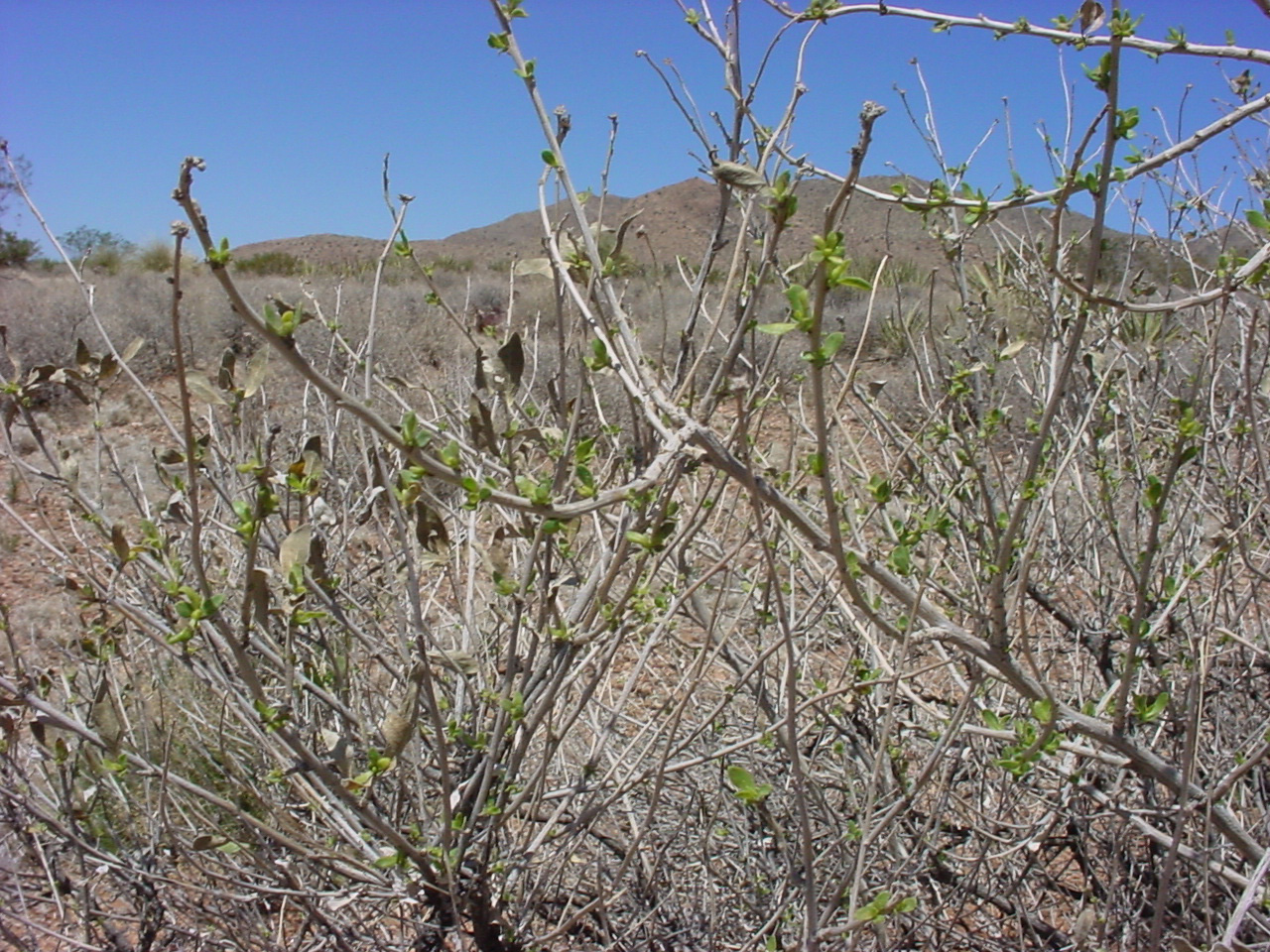
- Flourensia cernua

Scientific classification
- Kingdom: Plantae
- Clade: Embryophytes
- Clade: Tracheophytes
- Clade: Angiosperms
- Clade: Eudicots
- Clade: Asterids
- Order: Asterales
- Family: Asteraceae
- Subfamily: Asteroideae
- Tribe: Heliantheae
- Subtribe: Enceliinae
- Genus: Flourensia; DC.

Type species
- Flourensia laurifolia DC.

= Flourensia =

Genus of flowering plants

Flourensia is a genus of flowering plants in the family Asteraceae. It contains subshrubs and shrubs, which are commonly known as tarworts. They are found in the southwestern United States, Mexico, and central South America (Bolivia and northern Argentina). The genus name honours French physiologist Jean Pierre Flourens (1794–1867).

Phylogenetic studies found that the genus as previously circumscribed was polyphyletic, and in 2023 many of the South American species were placed in the new genus Austroflourensia.

== Species ==
20 species are currently accepted.

- Flourensia blakeana M.O.Dillon – Argentina (Tucuman, Catamarca)
- Flourensia campestris Griseb. – Argentina (La Rioja, San Juan, Santiago del Estero, Catamarca)
- Flourensia cernua DC. – American tarwort, tarbush - Chihuahua, Coahuila, USA (Texas New Mexico Arizona)
- Flourensia collodes (Greenm.) S.F.Blake – Chiapas, Oaxaca
- Flourensia dentata S.F.Blake – Zacatecas
- Flourensia glutinosa (B.L.Rob. & Greenm.) S.F.Blake - Oaxaca and Puebla
- Flourensia hirta S.F.Blake – Argentina (La Rioja, Catamarca)
- Flourensia ilicifolia Brandegee – Coahuila
- Flourensia laurifolia DC. – San Luis Potosí, Tamaulipas, Hidalgo
- Flourensia leptopoda S.F.Blake – Argentina (La Rioja, San Juan)
- Flourensia macroligulata Seeligm. – Argentina (Jujuy, Tucuman)
- Flourensia microphylla S.F.Blake
- Flourensia monticola M.O. Dillon – Coahuila, Nuevo León
- Flourensia oolepis S.F.Blake – Argentina (Catamarca, Córdoba, San Luis)
- Flourensia pringlei (A.Gray) S.F.Blake – Chihuahua, Durango, New Mexico (Hidalgo County)
- Flourensia pulcherrima M.O.Dillon – Durango
- Flourensia resinosa (Brandegee) S.F.Blake – Hidalgo, Querétaro
- Flourensia retinophylla S.F.Blake – Coahuila
- Flourensia riparia Griseb. – Argentina (Jujuy, Salta, Catamarca, Tucuman)
- Flourensia solitaria S.F.Blake – Coahuila

=== Formerly placed here ===
- Austroflourensia angustifolia (DC.) J.C.Ospina & S.E.Freire (aș Flourensia angustifolia (DC.) S.F.Blake) – Peru
- Austroflourensia cajabambensis (M.O.Dillon) J.C.Ospina & S.E.Freire (as Flourensia cajabambensis M.O.Dillon) – Peru
- Austroflourensia fiebrigii (S.F.Blake) J.C.Ospina & S.E.Freire (as Flourensia fiebrigii S.F.Blake) – Argentina, Bolivia
- Austroflourensia glutinosa (Rusby) J.C.Ospina & S.E.Freire (as Flourensia heterolepis S.F.Blake) – Bolivia (Cochabamba, Santa Cruz), Peru (Cusco)
- Austroflourensia hirtissima (S.F.Blake) J.C.Ospina & S.E.Freire (as Flourensia hirtissima S.F.Blake) – Argentina (Río Negro)
- Austroflourensia macrophylla (S.F.Blake) J.C.Ospina & S.E.Freire (as Flourensia macrophylla (A.Gray) S.F.Blake) – Peru
- Austroflourensia niederleinii (S.F.Blake) J.C.Ospina & S.E.Freire (as Flourensia niederleinii S.F.Blake) – Argentina (La Rioja)
- Austroflourensia peruviana (M.O.Dillon) J.C.Ospina & S.E.Freire (as Flourensia peruviana M.O.Dillon) – Peru (Ayacucho, Huancavelica)
- Austroflourensia polycephala (M.O.Dillon) J.C.Ospina & S.E.Freire (as Flourensia polycephala M.O.Dillon) – Peru (Apurímac, Cusco)
- Austroflourensia suffrutescens (R.E.Fr.) J.C.Ospina & S.E.Freire (as Flourensia polyclada S.F.Blake and Flourensia suffrutescens S.F.Blake) – Argentina (Jujuy, Salta)
- Austroflourensia thurifera (Molina) J.C.Ospina & S.E.Freire (as Flourensia thurifera (Molina) DC.) – Chile (Coquimbo, Santiago, Valparaíso)
- Austroflourensia tortuosa (Griseb.) J.C.Ospina & S.E.Freire (as Flourensia tortuosa Griseb.) – Argentina (Salta, Catamarca, Tucuman)
