= Lycoseris eggersii =

Conservation status
- Endangered (IUCN 3.1)

Scientific classification
- Kingdom: Plantae
- Clade: Tracheophytes
- Clade: Angiosperms
- Clade: Eudicots
- Clade: Asterids
- Order: Asterales
- Family: Asteraceae
- Genus: Lycoseris
- Species: L. eggersii

Binomial name
- Lycoseris eggersii Hieron.

Synonyms
- Lycoseris sodiroi Hieron.

Species of flowering plant

Lycoseris eggersii is a species of flowering plant in the family Asteraceae. It is found only in Ecuador. Its natural habitats are subtropical or tropical moist lowland forests and subtropical or tropical moist montane forests. It is threatened by habitat loss.
