= Flourensia pringlei =

Scientific classification
- Kingdom: Plantae
- Clade: Tracheophytes
- Clade: Angiosperms
- Clade: Eudicots
- Clade: Asterids
- Order: Asterales
- Family: Asteraceae
- Tribe: Heliantheae
- Genus: Flourensia
- Species: F. pringlei

Binomial name
- Flourensia pringlei (A.Gray) S.F.Blake 1913

Synonyms
- Helianthella pringlei A.Gray 1886

Species of flowering plant

Flourensia pringlei, common name Pringle's tarwort, is a species of flowering plant in the family Asteraceae. It is native to the States of Chihuahua and Durango in northern Mexico, the range extending just barely over the international border into Hidalgo County in southwestern New Mexico.

Flourensia pringlei is a shrub up to 100 cm (39 in) tall. One plant can produce several flower heads, each on its own flower stalk. Each head contains 13-21 ray florets surrounding 40-50 disc florets.
