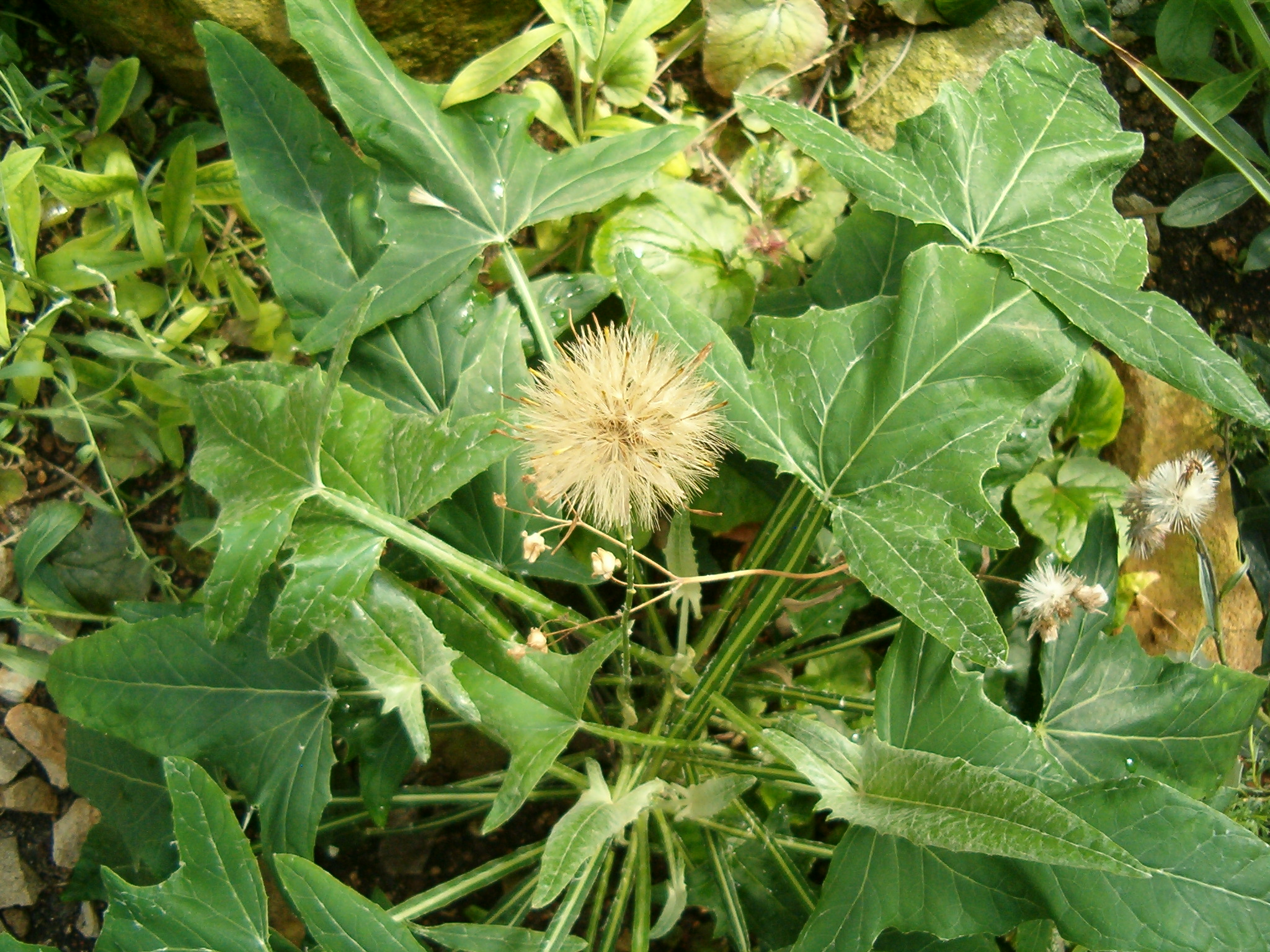
- Onoseris alata

Scientific classification
- Kingdom: Plantae
- Clade: Tracheophytes
- Clade: Angiosperms
- Clade: Eudicots
- Clade: Asterids
- Order: Asterales
- Family: Asteraceae
- Subfamily: Mutisioideae
- Tribe: Onoserideae (Bentham) Panero & V.A.Funk

= Onoserideae =

Tribe of flowering plants

The Onoserideae are a tribe of flowering plants in the family Asteraceae.

Genera

- Aphyllocladus Wedd.
- Gypothamnium Phil. (one sp.)
- Lycoseris Cass.
- Onoseris Willd.
- Paquirea Panero & S.E.Freire
- Plazia Ruiz & Pav
- Urmenetea Phil.
