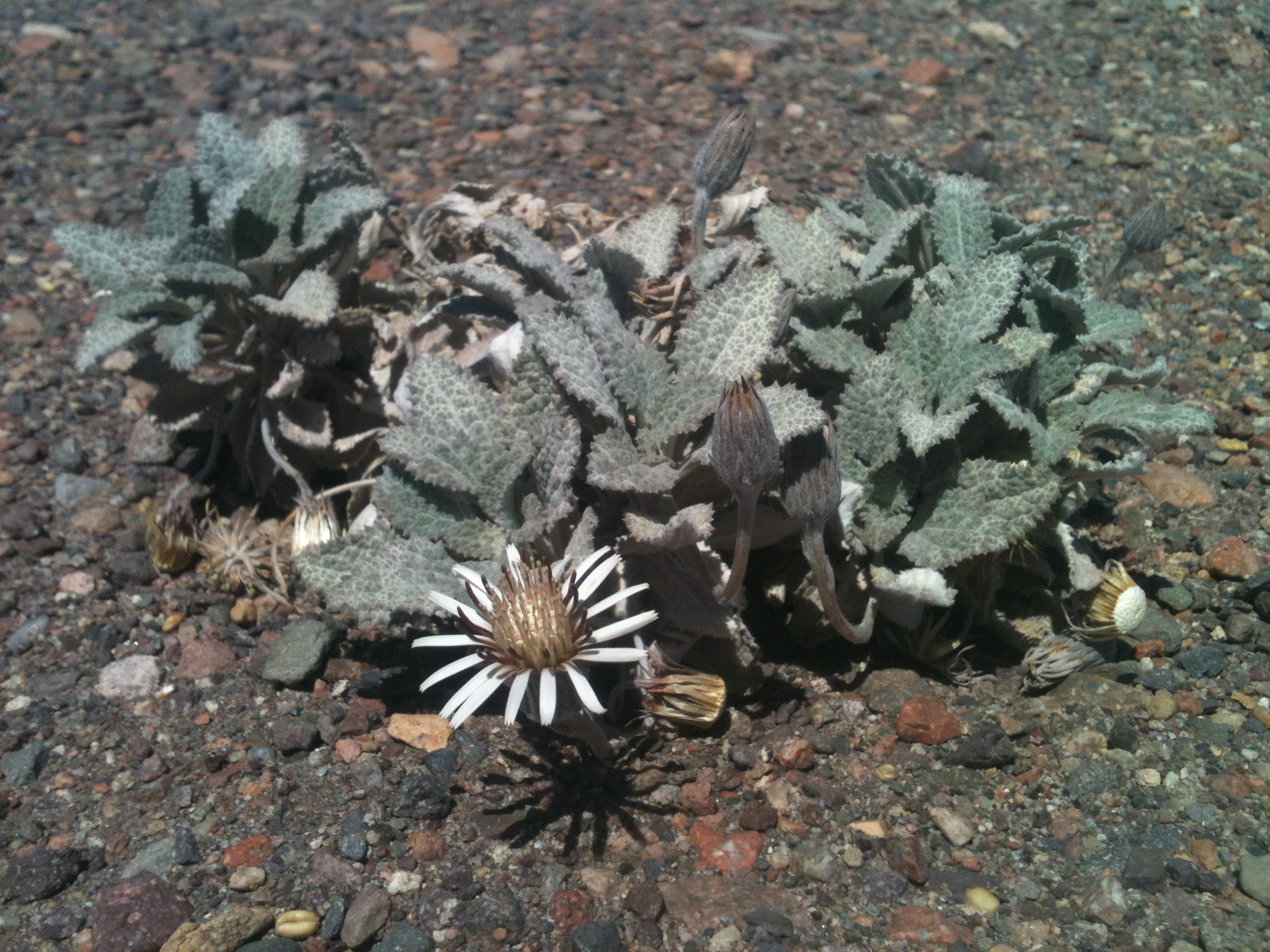

Scientific classification
- Kingdom: Plantae
- Clade: Tracheophytes
- Clade: Angiosperms
- Clade: Eudicots
- Clade: Asterids
- Order: Asterales
- Family: Asteraceae
- Subfamily: Mutisioideae
- Tribe: Onoserideae
- Genus: Urmenetea; Phil.
- Species: U. atacamensis

Binomial name
- Urmenetea atacamensis Phil.

Synonyms
- Onoseris atacamensis (Phil.) Hoffmann

= Urmenetea =

Genus of flowering plants

Urmenetea is a genus of South American plants in the family Asteraceae.

Species

The only known species is Urmenetea atacamensis, native to northern Chile (Antofagasta, Atacama) and northern Argentina (Catamarca, Jujuy, Salta).

Uses

According to "Enzyklopädie der Psychoaktiven Pflanzen", natives of the atacama desert use the plant for its psychoactive properties. When chewing the leaves, Dr.phil Christian Rätsch reported a sensation of local anestesia and a general feeling of euphoria and stimulation, akin to the effects of chewing coca leaves. Smoked injestion may result in both narcotic and stimulant effects. "Enzyklopädie der Psychoactiven Pflanzen" lists 0.3g of dried leaves as a sufficient dosage. Nothing is known about the chemical properties of the active ingredient and its dangers.
