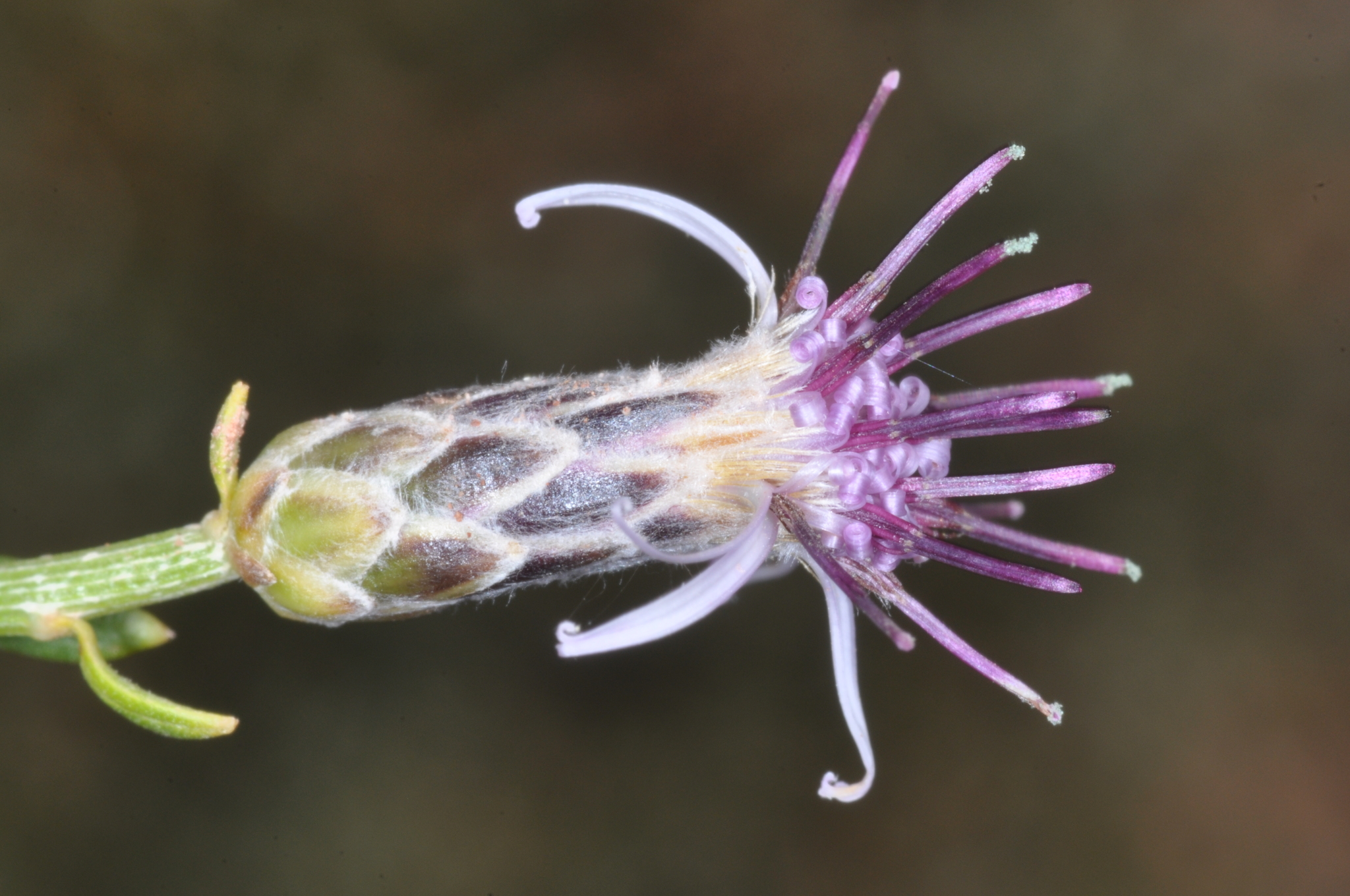
- Amphyllocladus spartioides

Scientific classification
- Kingdom: Plantae
- Clade: Embryophytes
- Clade: Tracheophytes
- Clade: Angiosperms
- Clade: Eudicots
- Clade: Asterids
- Order: Asterales
- Family: Asteraceae
- Subfamily: Mutisioideae
- Tribe: Onoserideae
- Genus: Aphyllocladus; Wedd.

Type species
- Aphyllocladus spartioides Wedd.

Synonyms
- Jobaphes Phil.

= Aphyllocladus =

Genus of flowering plants

Aphyllocladus is a genus of flowering plants in the family Asteraceae.

== Description ==
Aphyllocladus species are monoecious shrubs.

=== Stems and leaves ===
The species have stems with strong and very wide ribs, with tufts of long simple, two- to three-celled, flagellate hairs in the narrow grooves between them, and large secretory cavities. The linear to spathulate leaves, are alternate set along the branches, but are shedded early so the plants look leafless most of the time.

=== Inflorescence ===
The flower heads are set individually at the tip of the branches. The lilac to purple corollas of the disc florets are deeply split, creating five coiled lobes. The anthers have stump tips, long pilose tails, and produce pollen that is higher than wide. The branches of the style are finely grainy on the outside. The one-seeded, indehiscent fruits (called cypselas) may have long-pilose hairs or lack hair altogether, but are not bristly or barbed.

== Taxonomy ==
The following species are recognised:

- Aphyllocladus denticulatus (J.Rémy ex J.Rémy) Cabrera - northern Chile
- Aphyllocladus ephedroides Cabrera - Argentina (La Rioja, Catamarca, San Juan)
- Aphyllocladus sanmartinianus Molfino - Argentina (Mendoza, San Juan)
- Aphyllocladus spartioides Wedd. - Bolivia, Argentina (Jujuy, Salta)

Formerly placed here:

- Famatinanthus decussatus, as A. decussatus - Argentina (La Rioja).

== Distribution ==
The genus is native to Bolivia, Chile and Argentina.
