= Synantherology =

Study of the plant family Asteraceae

Synantherology is a branch of botany that deals with the study of the plant family Asteraceae (also called Compositae). The name of the field refers to the fused anthers possessed by members of the family, and recalls an old French name, synantherées, for the family.

Although many of the plants of the Asteraceae were described for the European community at least as long ago as Theophrastus, an organization of the family into tribes, which remained largely stable throughout the 20th century, was published in 1873 by George Bentham.

In a 1970 article titled "The New Synantherology", Harold E. Robinson advocated greater attention to microstructures (studied with the compound light microscope). He was not the first, as Alexandre de Cassini and others of the 19th century split species based on fine distinctions of microstructure, a tendency which Bentham found excessive.

Noted United States synantherologists include:

- T. M. Barkley
- V. A. Funk
- D. J. Keil
- R. M. King
- Harold E. Robinson
- J. A. Soule
- T. F. Stuessy
- Billie Lee Turner Sr.
