= Gypothamnium =

Scientific classification
- Kingdom: Plantae
- Clade: Tracheophytes
- Clade: Angiosperms
- Clade: Eudicots
- Clade: Asterids
- Order: Asterales
- Family: Asteraceae
- Subfamily: Mutisioideae
- Tribe: Onoserideae
- Genus: Gypothamnium; Phil.
- Species: G. pinifolium

Binomial name
- Gypothamnium pinifolium Phil.

Synonyms
- Plazia pinnifolia (Phil.) O.Hoffm.

Species of plant

Gypothamnium is a genus of South American flowering plants in the family Asteraceae.

Species

There is only one known species, Gypothamnium pinifolium, native to the Atacama Desert of northern Chile.
