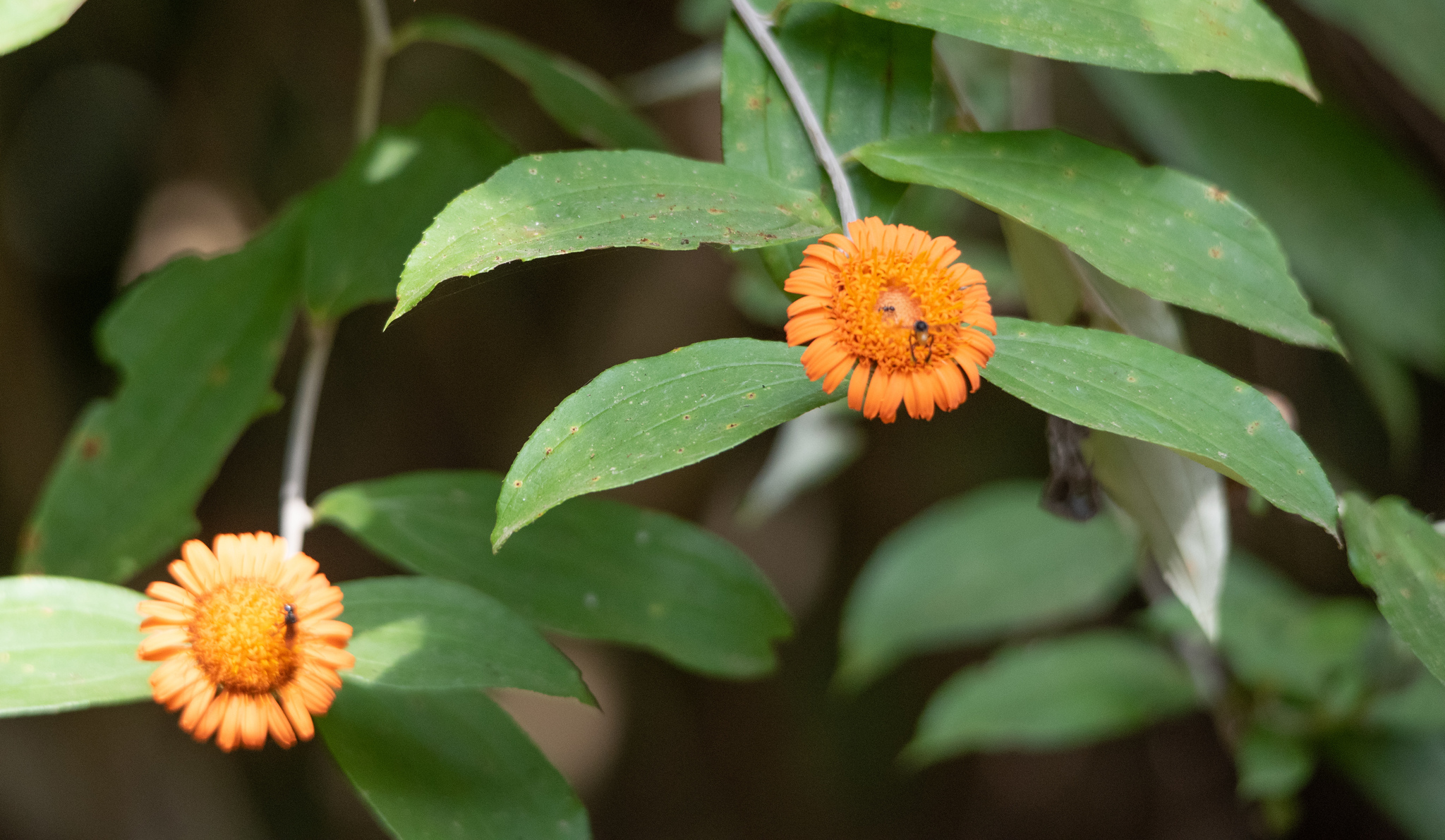
- Lycoseris triplinervia

Scientific classification
- Kingdom: Plantae
- Clade: Embryophytes
- Clade: Tracheophytes
- Clade: Spermatophytes
- Clade: Angiosperms
- Clade: Eudicots
- Clade: Asterids
- Order: Asterales
- Family: Asteraceae
- Subfamily: Mutisioideae
- Tribe: Onoserideae
- Genus: Lycoseris; Cass.

Type species
- Atractylis mexicana L.f.

Synonyms
- Diazeuxis D.Don; Langsdorfia Willd. ex Less.

= Lycoseris =

Genus of flowering plants

Lycoseris is a genus of Central and South American flowering plants in the family Asteraceae.

Species

- Lycoseris boliviana Britton - Bolivia, Mato Grosso do Sul
- Lycoseris colombiana K.Egeröd - Cauca
- Lycoseris crocata (Bertol.) S.F.Blake - Colombia, Central America
- Lycoseris eggersii Hieron. - Ecuador
- Lycoseris grandis Benth. - Costa Rica
- Lycoseris macrocephala Greenm. - Costa Rica
- Lycoseris mexicana (L.f.) Cass. - Colombia
- Lycoseris minor K.Egeröd - Colombia
- Lycoseris retroflexa J. Koster - Bolivia
- Lycoseris trinervis (D.Don) S.F.Blake - Peru, Ecuador
- Lycoseris triplinervia Less. - Venezuela, Colombia, Panama
