= Austroflourensia suffrutescens =

Scientific classification
- Kingdom: Plantae
- Clade: Tracheophytes
- Clade: Angiosperms
- Clade: Eudicots
- Clade: Asterids
- Order: Asterales
- Family: Asteraceae
- Genus: Austroflourensia
- Species: A. suffrutescens

Binomial name
- Austroflourensia suffrutescens (R.E.Fr.) J.C.Ospina & S.E.Freire (2023)

Synonyms
- Encelia suffrutescens R.E.Fr.; Flourensia polyclada S.F.Blake; Flourensia suffrutescens S.F.Blake

Species of flowering plant

Austroflourensia suffrutescens is a species of flowering plant in the family Asteraceae. It is native to Jujuy and Salta provinces of northwestern Argentina.
