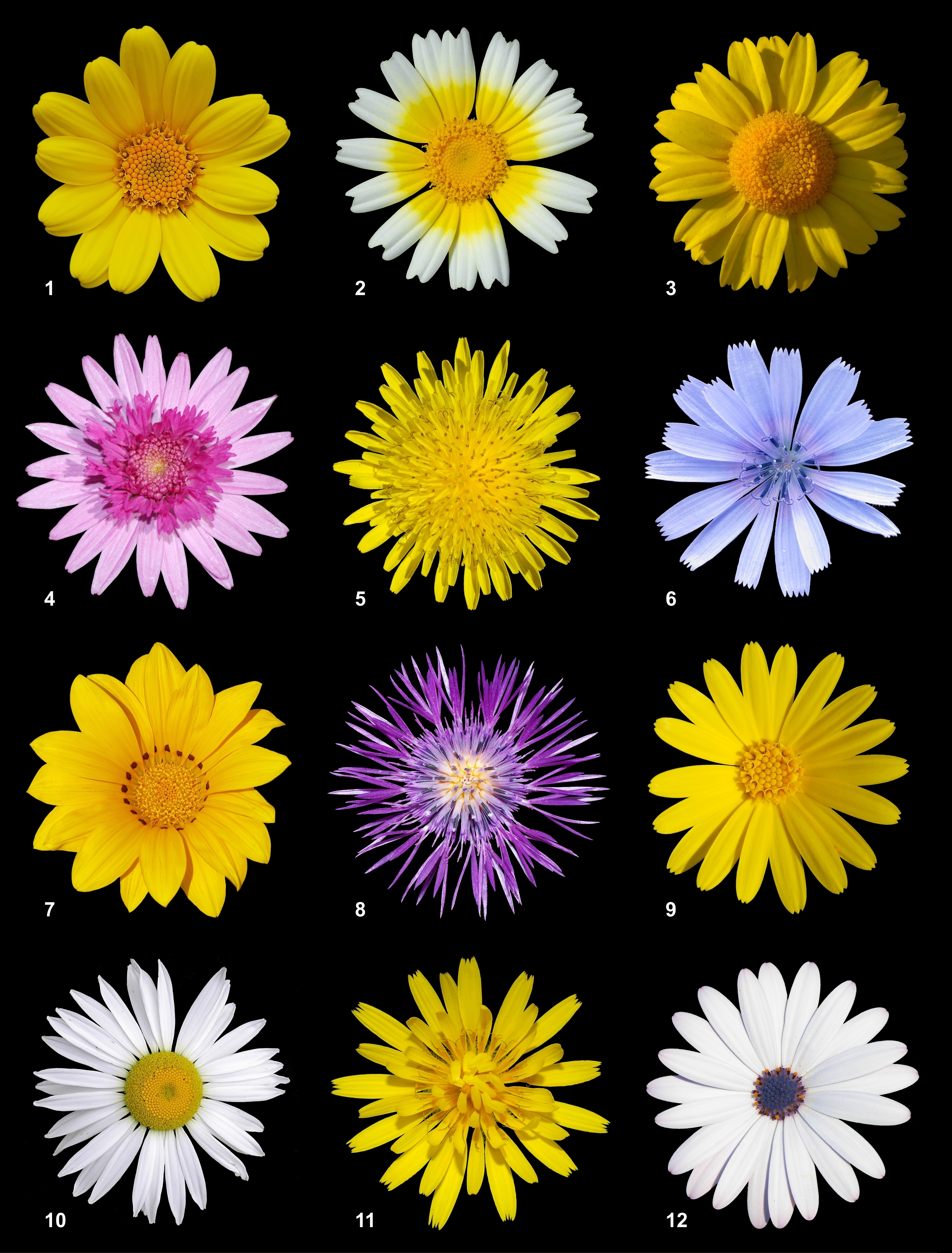
- Twelve species of Asteraceae from the subfamilies Asteroideae, Carduoideae, and Cichorioideae

Scientific classification
- Kingdom: Plantae
- Clade: Tracheophytes
- Clade: Angiosperms
- Clade: Eudicots
- Clade: Asterids
- Order: Asterales
- Family: Asteraceae; Bercht. & J.Presl

Type genus
- Aster L.

Subfamilies
- Asteroideae Lindl. (1829); Barnadesioideae Bremer & Jansen (1992); Carduoideae Sweet (1826); Cichorioideae Chevall. (1828); Corymbioideae Panero & V.A.Funk (2002); Dicomoideae S.Ortiz (2002); Famatinanthoideae S.E.Freire, Ariza & Panero (2014); Gochnatioideae Panero & V.A.Funk (2002); Gymnarrhenoideae Panero & V.A.Funk (2002); Hecastocleidoideae Panero & V.A.Funk (2002); Mutisioideae Lindl. (1829); Pertyoideae Panero & V.A.Funk (2002); Stifftioideae Panero (2007); Tarchonanthoideae S.Ortiz (2020); Vernonioideae Lindl. (1829); Wunderlichioideae Panero & V.A.Funk (2007)

Diversity
- 1,911 genera

Synonyms
- List: Acarnaceae Link; Ambrosiaceae Bercht. & J.Presl; Anthemidaceae Bercht. & J.Presl; Aposeridaceae Raf.; Arctotidaceae Bercht. & J.Presl; Artemisiaceae Martinov; Athanasiaceae Martinov; Calendulaceae Bercht. & J.Presl; Carduaceae Bercht. & J.Presl; Cassiniaceae Sch.Bip.; Cichoriaceae Juss.; Compositae Giseke; Coreopsidaceae Link; Cynaraceae Spenn.; Echinopaceae Bercht. & J.Presl; Eupatoriaceae Bercht. & J.Presl; Helichrysaceae Link; Inulaceae Bercht. & J.Presl; Lactucaceae Drude; Mutisiaceae Burnett; Partheniaceae Link; Perdiciaceae Link; Senecionaceae Bercht. & J.Presl; Vernoniaceae Burmeist.

= Asteraceae =

Asteraceae Temporal range: 76–0 Ma Campanian–recent

Large family of flowering plants

Asteraceae (/ˌæstəˈreɪsi.iː, -ˌaɪ/) is a large family of flowering plants that consists of over 32,000 known species in over 1,900 genera within the order Asterales. The number of species in Asteraceae is rivaled only by the Orchidaceae, and which is the larger family is unclear as the number of extant species in each family is unknown. The Asteraceae were first described in the year 1740 and given the original name Compositae. The family is commonly known as the aster, daisy, composite, or sunflower family.

Most species of Asteraceae are herbaceous plants, and may be annual, biennial, or perennial, but there are also shrubs, vines, and trees. The family has a widespread distribution, from subpolar to tropical regions, in a wide variety of habitats. Most occur in hot desert and cold or hot semi-desert climates, and they are found on every continent but Antarctica. Their common primary characteristic is compound flower heads, technically known as capitula, consisting of sometimes hundreds of tiny individual florets enclosed by a whorl of protective involucral bracts.

The oldest known fossils are pollen grains from the Late Cretaceous (Campanian to Maastrichtian) of Antarctica, dated to c. 76–66 million years ago (mya). It is estimated that the crown group of Asteraceae evolved at least 85.9 mya (Late Cretaceous, Santonian) with a stem node age of 88–89 mya (Late Cretaceous, Coniacian).

Asteraceae is an economically important family, providing food staples, garden plants, and herbal medicines. Species outside of their native ranges can become weedy or invasive.

== Description ==
Members of the Asteraceae are mostly herbaceous plants, but some shrubs, vines, and trees (such as Lachanodes arborea) do exist. Asteraceae species are generally easy to distinguish from other plants because of their unique inflorescence and other shared characteristics, such as the joined anthers of the stamens. Nonetheless, determining genera and species of some groups, such as Hieracium, is notoriously difficult (see "damned yellow composite" for example).

=== Roots ===
Members of the family Asteraceae generally produce taproots, but sometimes they possess fibrous root systems. Some species have underground stems in the form of caudices or rhizomes. These can be fleshy or woody, depending on the species.

=== Stems ===
The stems are herbaceous, aerial, branched, and cylindrical with glandular hairs, usually erect, but can be prostrate to ascending. The stems can contain secretory canals with resin, or latex, which is particularly common among the Cichorioideae.

=== Leaves ===
Leaves can be alternate, opposite, or whorled. They may be simple, but are often deeply lobed or otherwise incised, often conduplicate or revolute. The margins also can be entire or toothed. Resin or latex can also be present in the leaves.

=== Inflorescences ===
Nearly all Asteraceae bear their flowers in dense flower heads called capitula. They are surrounded by involucral bracts, and when viewed from a distance, each capitulum may appear to be a single flower. Enlarged outer (peripheral) flowers in the capitulum may resemble petals, and the involucral bracts may look like a calyx. Notable exceptions include Hecastocleis shockleyi (the only species in the subfamily Hecastocleidoideae) and the species of the genus Corymbium (the only genus in the subfamily Corymbioideae), which have one-flowered bisexual capitulas, Gundelia with one-flowered unisexual capitulas, and Gymnarrhena micrantha with one-flowered female capitulas and few flowered male capitulas.

==== Floral heads ====
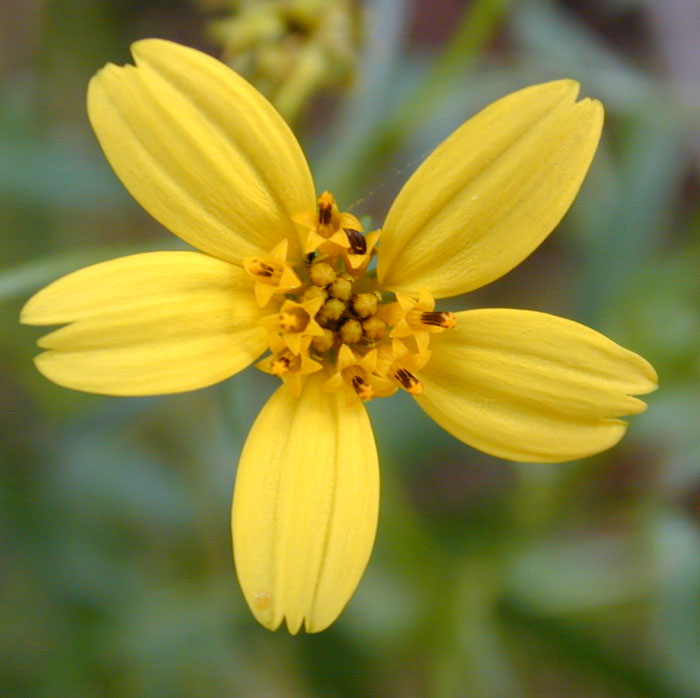
A typical Asteraceae flower head, showing the (five) individual ray florets and the (approximately 16) disk florets of Bidens torta specimen

In plants of the Asteraceae, what appears to be a single "daisy"-type flower is actually a composite of several much smaller flowers, known as the capitulum or head. By visually presenting as a single flower, the capitulum attracts pollinators in the same manner that other "showy" flowering plants in numerous other, older plant families have evolved to attract pollinators. The previous name for the family, Compositae, reflects the fact that what appears to be a single floral entity is in fact a composite of much smaller flowers.

The "petals" or "sunrays" in an "asteraceous" head are in fact individual strap-shaped flowers called ray flowers or ray florets, and the "sun disk" is made up of smaller, radially symmetric, individual flowers called disc flowers or disc florets. The word aster means "star" in Greek, referring to the appearance of most family members as a "celestial body with rays". The capitulum, which often appears to be a single flower, is often referred to as a head. In some species, the entire head is able to pivot its floral stem in the course of the day to track the sun (like a "smart" solar panel), thus maximizing the reflectivity of the entire floral unit and further attracting flying pollinators.

Nearest to the flower stem lie a series of small, usually green, scale-like bracts. These are known as phyllaries; collectively, they form the involucre, which serves to protect the immature head of florets during its development. The individual florets are arranged atop a dome-like structure called the receptacle.

The individual florets in a head consist, developmentally, of five fused petals (rarely four); instead of sepals, they have threadlike, hairy, or bristly structures, known collectively as a pappus (plural pappi). The pappus surrounds the ovary and can, when mature and attached to a seed, adhere to animal fur or be carried by air currents, aiding in seed dispersal. The whitish, fluffy head of a dandelion, commonly blown on by children, consists of numerous seeds resting on the receptacle, each seed attached to its pappus. The pappi provide a parachute-like structure to help the seed travel from its point of origin to a more hospitable site.

Schemes and floral diagrams of the different floret types of the Asteraceae: Leucanthemum vulgare: a = disc flower; b = ray flower. 1 – style with stigmas 2 – anthers 3 – corolla (petals); typically, in the ray flower, three petals are joined to form a strap (in other species, five petals can fuse to form a ligule) 4 – reduced calyx 4' – Carduus acanthoides (left shaded circle): pappus: in many Asteraceae species, the calyx develops as a fibrous or bristly pappus 5 – inferior ovary: fused ovary consisting of two carpels, containing one abaxial ovule (basal placentation).

A ray flower is a two - or three-lobed, strap-shaped, individual flower, found in the head of most members of the Asteraceae. The corolla of the ray flower may have two tiny, vestigial teeth, opposite to the three-lobed strap, or tongue, indicating its evolution by fusion from an ancestral, five-part corolla. In some species, the 3:2 arrangement is reversed, with two lobes, and zero or three tiny teeth visible opposite the tongue.

A ligulate flower is a five-lobed, strap-shaped, individual flower found in the heads of certain other asteraceous species. A ligule is the strap-shaped tongue of the corolla of either a ray flower or of a ligulate flower. A disk flower (or disc flower) is a radially symmetric individual flower in the head, which is ringed by the ray flowers when both are present. In some species, ray flowers may be arranged around the disc in irregular symmetry, or with a weakly bilaterally symmetric arrangement.

== Variations ==
When an Asteraceae flower head has only disc flowers that are bisexual, it is a discoid head. A subtype of discoid heads are radiant heads, which have larger, dilated, and often bilateral outer florets.

Disciform heads include disk florets, which may be male or bisexual, and surrounding florets that may be naked or tubular and female.

A radiate head has disc florets surrounded by an outer portion of ray florets known as a lamina.

A ligulate head has only ligulate florets.

Some other species produce two different head types: staminate (all-male), or pistillate (all-female). In a few unusual species, the "head" will consist of one single disc flower; alternatively, a few species will produce both single-flowered female heads, along with multi-flowered male heads, in their "pollination strategy".

=== Floral structures ===
Flower diagram of Carduus (Carduoideae) shows (outermost to innermost): subtending bract and stem axis; calyx forming a pappus; fused corolla; stamens fused to corolla; gynoecium with two carpels and one locule.

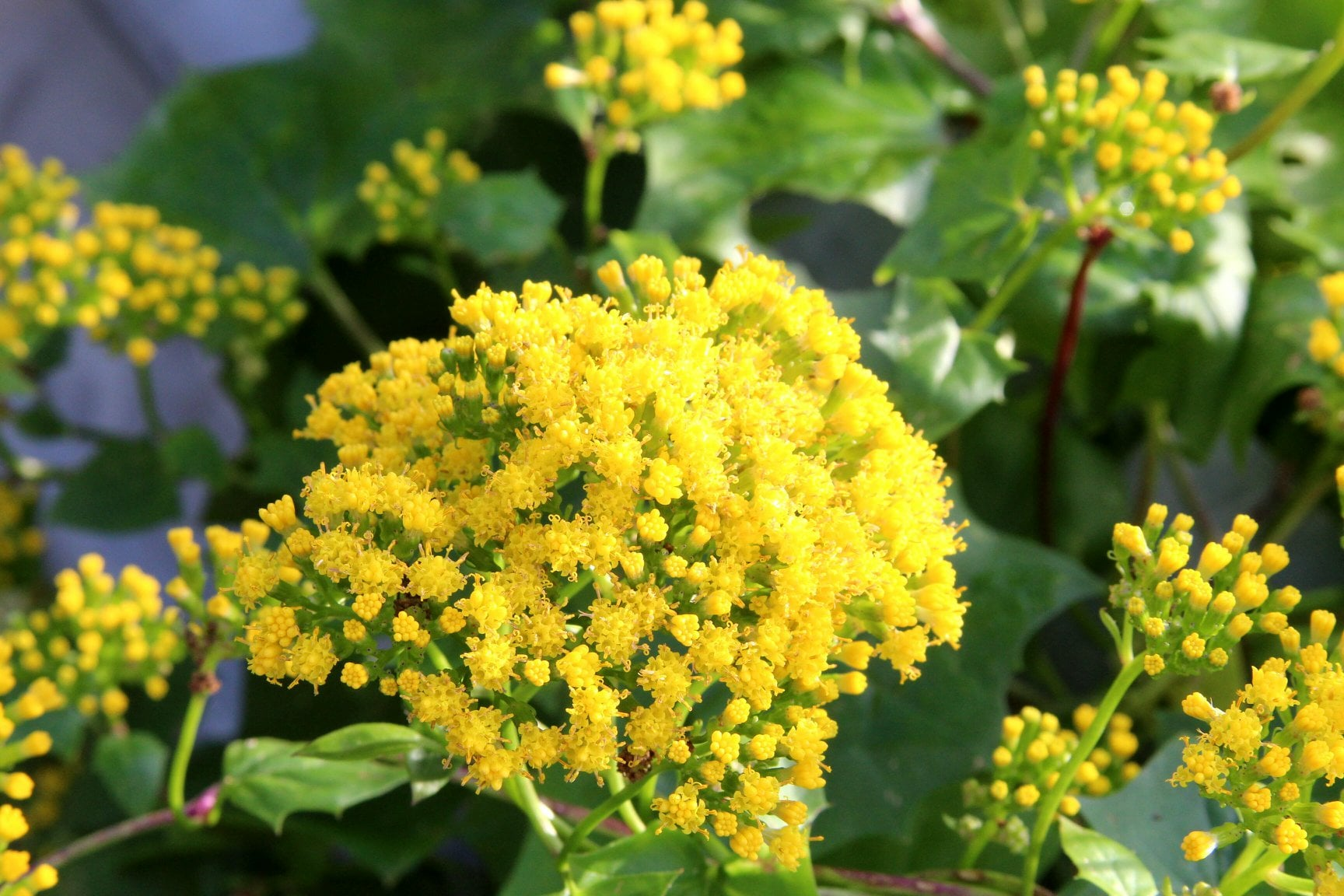
Discoid flowerheads of Delairea odorata

The distinguishing characteristic of Asteraceae is their inflorescence, a type of specialised, composite flower head or pseudanthium, technically called a calathium or capitulum, that may look superficially like a single flower. The capitulum is a contracted raceme composed of numerous individual sessile flowers, called florets, all sharing the same receptacle.

A set of bracts forms an involucre surrounding the base of the capitulum. These are called "phyllaries", or "involucral bracts". They may simulate the sepals of the pseudanthium. These are mostly herbaceous but can also be brightly coloured (e.g. Helichrysum) or have a scarious (dry and membranous) texture. The phyllaries can be free or fused, and arranged in one to many rows, overlapping like the tiles of a roof (imbricate) or not (this variation is important in identification of tribes and genera).

Each floret may be subtended by a bract, called a "palea" or "receptacular bract". These bracts are often called "chaff". The presence or absence of these bracts, their distribution on the receptacle, and their size and shape are all important diagnostic characteristics for genera and tribes.

The florets have five petals fused at the base to form a corolla tube, and they may be either actinomorphic or zygomorphic. Disc florets are usually actinomorphic, with five petal lips on the rim of the corolla tube. The petal lips may be either very short or long, in which case they form deeply lobed petals. The latter is the only kind of floret in the Carduoideae, while the first kind is more widespread. Ray florets are always highly zygomorphic and are characterised by the presence of a ligule, a strap-shaped structure on the edge of the corolla tube consisting of fused petals. In the Asteroideae and other minor subfamilies, these are usually borne only on florets at the circumference of the capitulum and have a 3+2 scheme - above the fused corolla tube, three very long fused petals form the ligule, with the other two petals being inconspicuously small. The Cichorioideae has only ray florets, with a 5+0 scheme - all five petals form the ligule. A 4+1 scheme is found in the Barnadesioideae. The tip of the ligule is often divided into teeth, each one representing a petal. Some marginal florets may have no petals at all (filiform floret).

The calyx of the florets may be absent, but when present is always modified into a pappus of two or more teeth, scales or bristles, and this is often involved in the dispersion of the seeds. As with the bracts, the nature of the pappus is an important diagnostic feature.

There are usually four or five stamens. The filaments are fused to the corolla, while the anthers are generally connate (syngenesious anthers), thus forming a sort of tube around the style (theca). They commonly have basal and/or apical appendages. Pollen is released inside the tube and is collected around the growing style, and then, as the style elongates, is pushed out of the tube.

Time-lapse (200×) of Zinnia disc floret petals opening, their styles providing secondary pollen presentation. Visiting insects shown at normal speed. A thrips and two hoverflies eat the piled pollen. Two skipper butterflies reach the deep nectaries.

The pistil consists of two connate carpels. The style has two lobes. Stigmatic tissue may be located in the interior surface or form two lateral lines. The ovary is inferior and has only one ovule, with basal placentation.

=== Fruits and seeds ===
In members of the Asteraceae, the fruit is achene-like, and is called a cypsela (plural cypselae). Although there are two fused carpels, there is only one locule, and only one seed per fruit is formed. It may sometimes be winged or spiny because the pappus, which is derived from calyx tissue, often remains on the fruit (for example, in dandelion). In some species, however, the pappus falls off (for example, in Helianthus). Cypsela morphology is often used to help determine plant relationships at the genus and species level. The mature seeds usually have little or no endosperm.

=== Pollen ===
The pollen of composites is typically echinolophate, a morphological term meaning "with elaborate systems of ridges and spines dispersed around and between the apertures."

=== Metabolites ===
In Asteraceae, the energy store is generally in the form of inulin rather than starch. They produce iso/chlorogenic acid, sesquiterpene lactones, pentacyclic triterpene alcohols, various alkaloids, acetylenes (cyclic, aromatic, with vinyl end groups), tannins. They have terpenoid essential oils that never contain iridoids.

Asteraceae produce secondary metabolites, such as flavonoids and terpenoids. Some of these molecules can inhibit protozoan parasites such as Plasmodium, Trypanosoma, Leishmania and parasitic intestinal worms, and thus have potential in medicine.

== Taxonomy ==
=== History ===
Compositae, the original name for Asteraceae, were first described in 1740 by Dutch botanist Adriaan van Royen. Traditionally, two subfamilies were recognised: Asteroideae (or Tubuliflorae) and Cichorioideae (or Liguliflorae). The latter has been shown to be extensively paraphyletic, and has now been divided into 12 subfamilies, but the former still stands. The study of this family is known as synantherology.

Sunflowers belong to Heliantheae tribe

=== Phylogeny ===
The phylogenetic tree of subfamilies presented below is based on Panero & Funk (2002) updated in 2014, and now also includes the monotypic Famatinanthoideae. The diamond (♦) denotes a very poorly supported node (<50% bootstrap support), the dot (•) a poorly supported node (<80%).

- - Barnadesioideae: 10 genera, 93 species. South America, mainly the Andes.
  - - Famatinanthoideae: South America, 1 genus, 1 species Famatinanthus decussatus.
    - - Mutisioideae: 58 genera, 750 species. Absent from Europe, mostly in South America.
      - Stifftioideae: 11 genera. South America.
      - ♦
        - Wunderlichioideae: 8 genera, 24 species. Mostly in Venezuela and Guyana.
        - - Gochnatioideae: 4 or 5 genera, 90 species. Latin America and southern United States.
          - - Hecastocleidoideae: Only Hecastocleis shockleyi. Southwestern United States.
            - - Carduoideae: 83 genera, 2,500 species. Worldwide.
              - - Pertyoideae: 5 or 6 genera, 70 species. Asia.
                - - Gymnarrhenoideae: Two genera/species, Gymnarrhena micrantha (Northern Africa, Middle East) and Cavea tanguensis (Eastern Himalayas).
                  - •
                    - Cichorioideae: 224 genera, 3,200 species. Worldwide.
                    - - Corymbioideae: Only the genus Corymbium, with 9 species. Cape provinces, South Africa.
                      - •
                        Asteroideae: 1,130 genera and 16,200 species. Worldwide.

The family includes over 32,000 currently accepted species, in over 1,900 genera (list) in 13 subfamilies. The number of species in the family Asteraceae is rivaled only by Orchidaceae. Which is the larger family is unclear, because of the uncertainty about how many extant species each family includes. The four subfamilies Asteroideae, Cichorioideae, Carduoideae and Mutisioideae contain 99% of the species diversity of the whole family (approximately 70%, 14%, 11% and 3% respectively).

Because of the morphological complexity exhibited by this family, agreeing on generic circumscriptions has often been difficult for taxonomists. As a result, several of these genera have required multiple revisions.

==== Paleontology and evolutionary processes ====
The oldest known fossils of members of Asteraceae are pollen grains from the Late Cretaceous of Antarctica, dated to ~76–66 mya (Campanian to Maastrichtian) and assigned to the extant genus Dasyphyllum. Barreda, et al. (2015) estimated that the crown group of Asteraceae evolved at least 85.9 mya (Late Cretaceous, Santonian) with a stem node age of 88–89 mya (Late Cretaceous, Coniacian).

It is not known whether the precise cause of their great success was the development of the highly specialised capitulum, their ability to store energy as fructans (mainly inulin), which is an advantage in relatively dry zones, or some combination of these and possibly other factors. Heterocarpy, or the ability to produce different fruit morphs, has evolved and is common in Asteraceae. It allows seeds to be dispersed over varying distances, and each is adapted to different environments, increasing chances of survival.

=== Etymology and pronunciation ===
The original name Compositae is still valid under the International Code of Nomenclature for algae, fungi, and plants.

The alternative (as it came later) name Asteraceae (English: /ˌæstəˈreɪsi, -siˌaɪ, -siˌeɪ, -siˌiː/) comes to international scientific vocabulary from Neo-Latin, from Aster, the type genus, + -aceae, a standardized suffix for plant family names in modern taxonomy. This genus name comes from the Classical Latin word aster, "star", which came from Ancient Greek ἀστήρ (astḗr), "star". It refers to the star-like form of the inflorescence.

The vernacular name daisy, widely applied to members of this family, is derived from the Old English name of the daisy (Bellis perennis): dæġes ēaġe, meaning "day's eye". This is because the petals open at dawn and close at dusk.

== Distribution and habitat ==
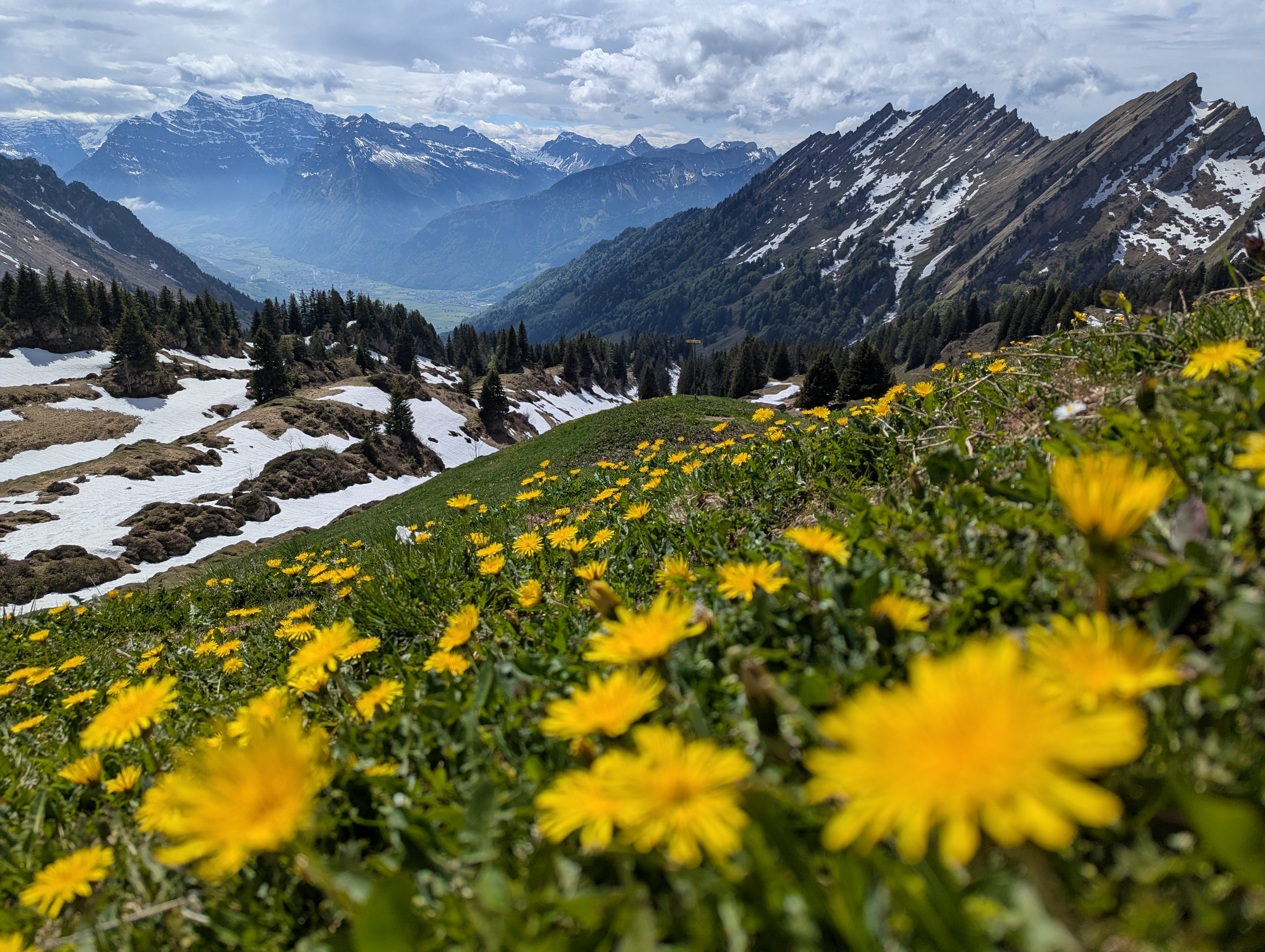
Dandelions on an alpine slope in Switzerland

Asteraceae species have a widespread distribution, from subpolar to tropical regions in a wide variety of habitats. Most occur in hot desert and cold or hot semi-desert climates, and they are found on every continent but Antarctica. They are especially numerous in tropical and subtropical regions (notably Central America, eastern Brazil, the Mediterranean, the Levant, southern Africa, central Asia, and southwestern China). The largest proportion of the species occur in the arid and semi-arid regions of subtropical and lower temperate latitudes. The Asteraceae family comprises 10% of all flowering plant species.

== Ecology ==
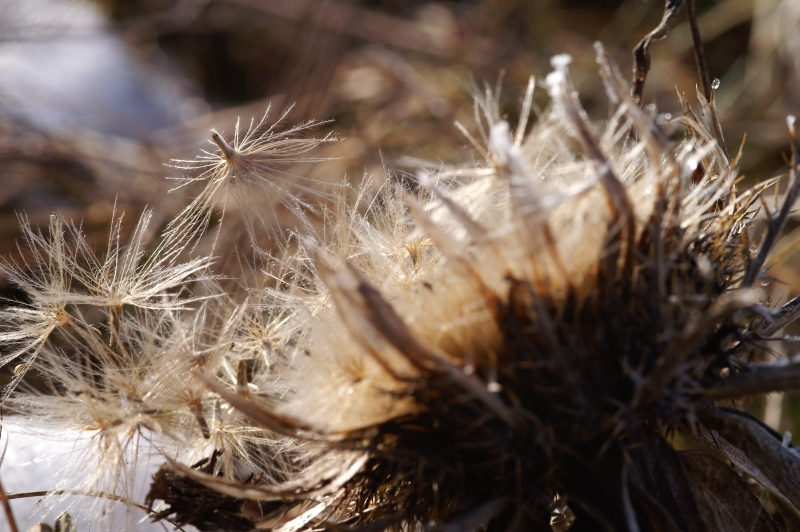
Anemochory in Carlina

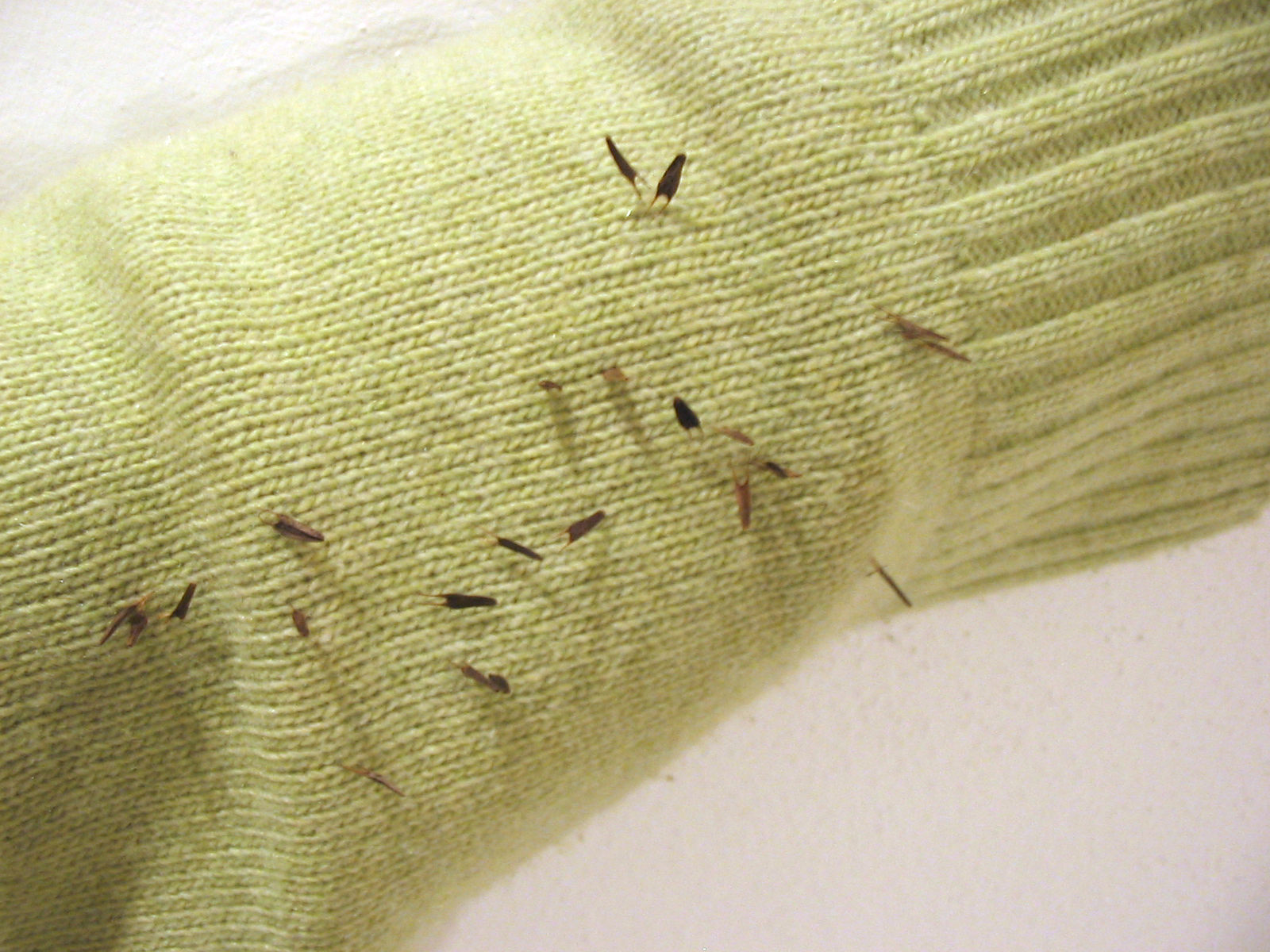
Epizoochory in Bidens tripartita

Asteraceae are especially common in open and dry environments. Many members of Asteraceae are pollinated by insects, which explains their value in attracting beneficial insects, but anemophily is also present (e.g. Ambrosia, Artemisia). There are many apomictic species in the family.

Seeds are ordinarily dispersed intact with the fruiting body, the cypsela. Anemochory (wind dispersal) is common, assisted by a hairy pappus. Epizoochory is another common method, in which the dispersal unit, a single cypsela (e.g. Bidens) or entire capitulum (e.g. Arctium) has hooks, spines or some structure to attach to the fur or plumage (or even clothes, as in the photo) of an animal just to fall off later far from its mother plant.

Some members of Asteraceae are economically important as weeds. Notable in the United States are Senecio jacobaea (ragwort), Senecio vulgaris (groundsel), and Taraxacum (dandelion). Some are invasive species in particular regions, often having been introduced by human agency. Examples include various tumbleweeds, Bidens, ragweeds, thistles, and dandelion. Dandelion was introduced into North America by European settlers who used the young leaves as a salad green. A number of species are toxic to grazing animals.

== Uses ==
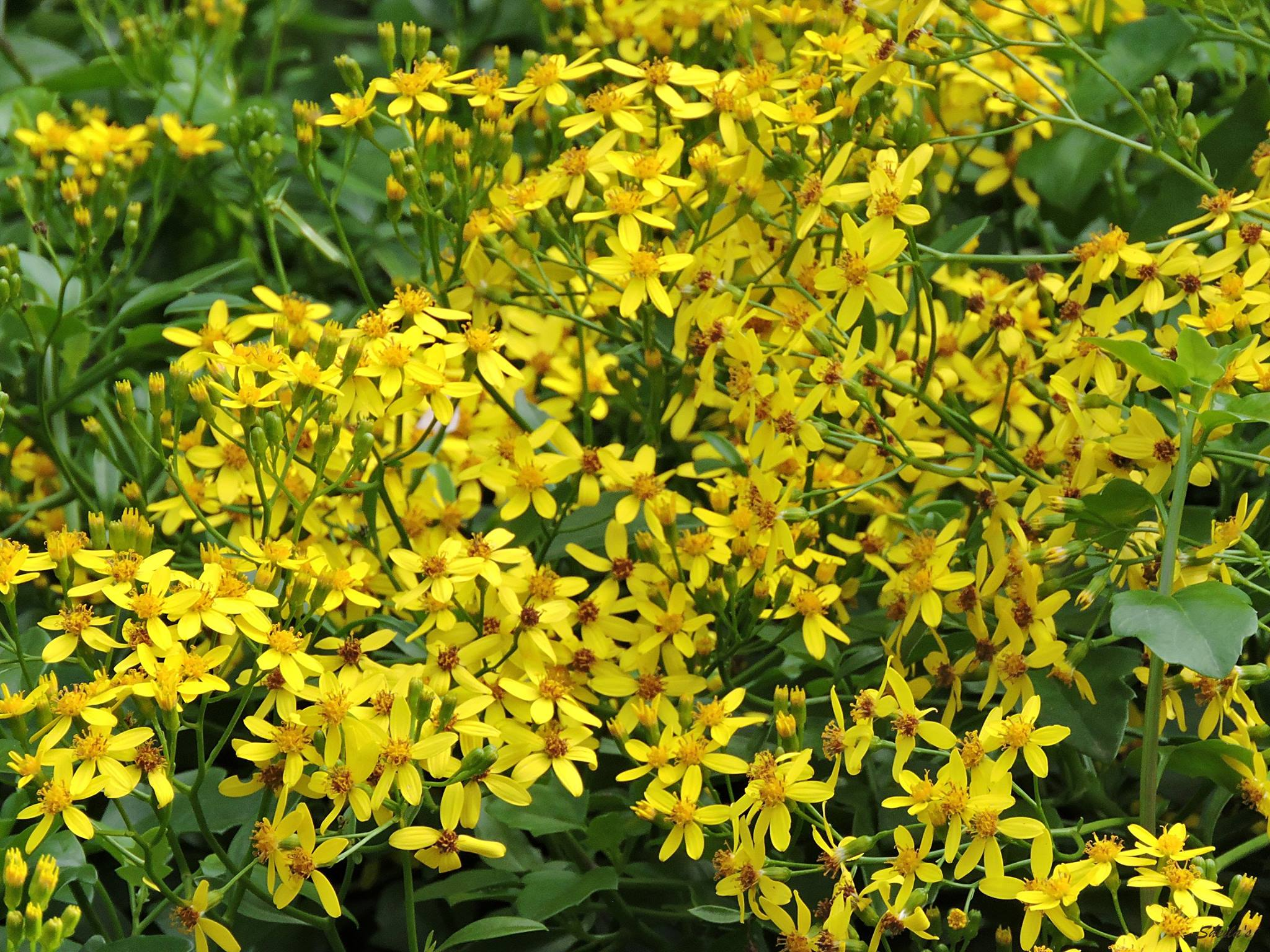
The twining succulent Senecio angulatus is used for its cut flowers, despite being an invasive weed in some places, such as Victoria, Australia and New Zealand.

Asteraceae is an economically important family, providing products such as cooking oils, leaf vegetables like lettuce, sunflower seeds, artichokes, sweetening agents, coffee substitutes and herbal teas. Several genera are of horticultural importance, including the common marigold (Calendula officinalis), Echinacea (coneflowers), various daisies, fleabane, chrysanthemums, dahlias, zinnias, and heleniums. Asteraceae are important in herbal medicine, including Grindelia, yarrow, and many others.

Commercially important plants in Asteraceae include the food crops Lactuca sativa (lettuce), Cichorium (chicory), Cynara scolymus (globe artichoke), Helianthus annuus (sunflower), Smallanthus sonchifolius (yacón), Carthamus tinctorius (safflower) and Helianthus tuberosus (Jerusalem artichoke).

Plants are used as herbs and in herbal teas and other beverages. Chamomile, for example, comes from two different species: the annual Matricaria chamomilla (German chamomile) and the perennial Chamaemelum nobile (Roman chamomile). Calendula (marigold) is grown commercially for herbal teas and potpourri. Echinacea is used as a medicinal tea. The wormwood genus Artemisia includes absinthe (A. absinthium) and tarragon (A. dracunculus). Winter tarragon (Tagetes lucida), is commonly grown and used as a tarragon substitute in climates where tarragon will not survive.

Many members of the family are grown as ornamental plants for their flowers, and some are important ornamental crops for the cut flower industry. Some examples are Chrysanthemum, Gerbera, Calendula, Dendranthema, Argyranthemum, Dahlia, Tagetes, Zinnia, and many others.

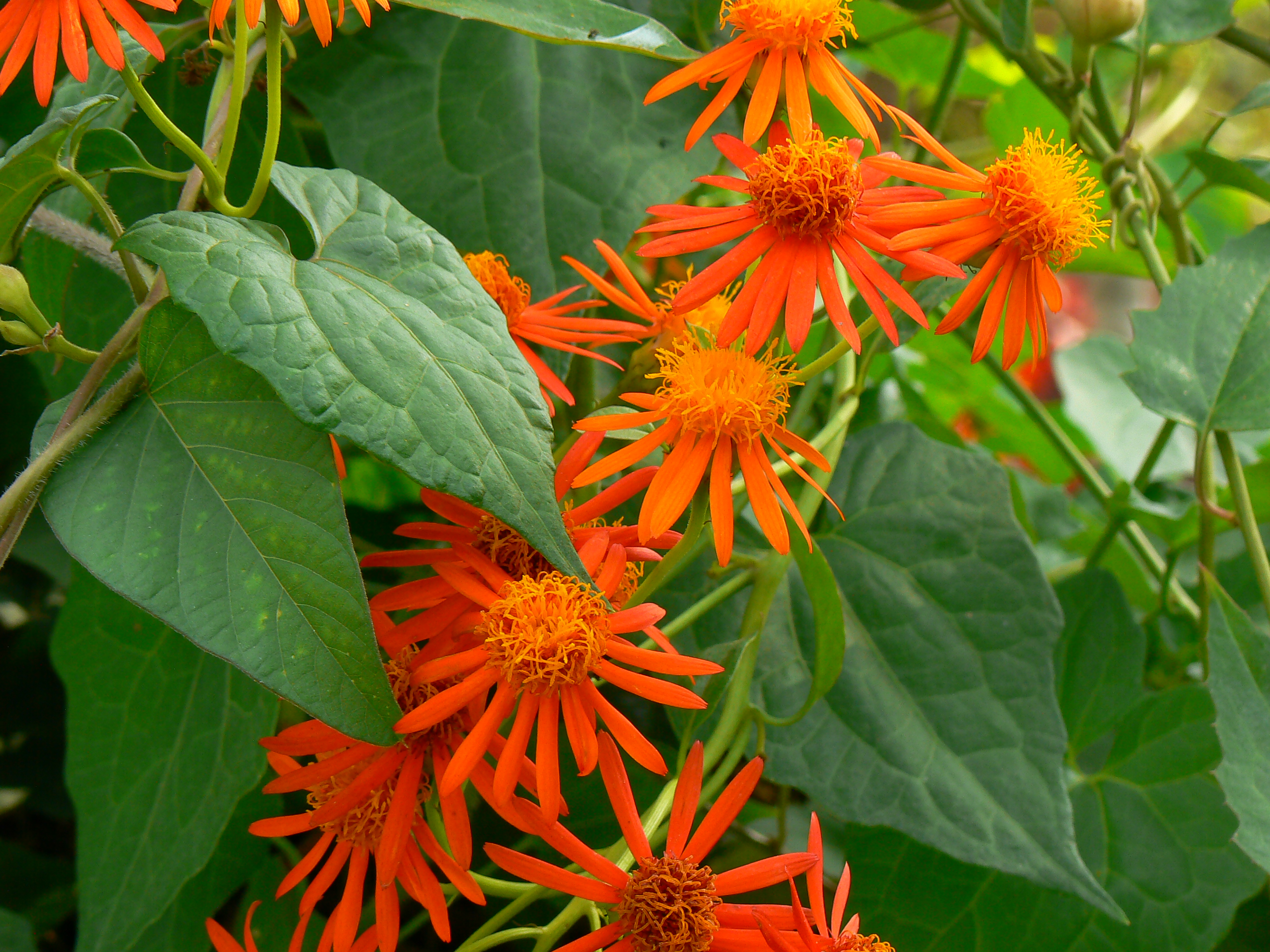
Pseudogynoxys chenopodioides is used as an ornamental plant for its bright orange flowers.

Many species of this family possess medicinal properties and are used as traditional antiparasitic medicine.

Members of the family are also commonly featured in medical and phytochemical journals because the sesquiterpene lactone compounds contained within them are an important cause of allergic contact dermatitis. Allergy to these compounds is the leading cause of allergic contact dermatitis in florists in the US. Pollen from ragweed Ambrosia is among the main causes of so-called hay fever in the United States.

Asteraceae are also used for some industrial purposes. French Marigold (Tagetes patula) is common in commercial poultry feeds, and its oil is extracted for uses in cola and the cigarette industry. The genera Chrysanthemum, Pulicaria, Tagetes, and Tanacetum contain species with useful insecticidal properties. Parthenium argentatum (guayule) is a source of hypoallergenic latex.

Several members of the family are copious nectar producers and are useful for evaluating pollinator populations during their bloom. Centaurea (knapweed), Helianthus annuus (domestic sunflower), and some species of Solidago (goldenrod) are major "honey plants" for beekeepers. Solidago produces relatively high protein pollen, which helps honey bees over winter.

== See also ==
- List of Asteraceae genera

== Bibliography ==
- Funk, Vicki A.; Susanna, A.; Stuessy, T.F.; Bayer, R.J., eds. (2009). Systematics, Evolution, and Biogeography of Compositae. Vienna: International Association for Plant Taxonomy. ISBN 978-3-9501754-3-1. Archived from the original on 15 January 2023 – via Google Books. (Also available here at Internet Archive)
