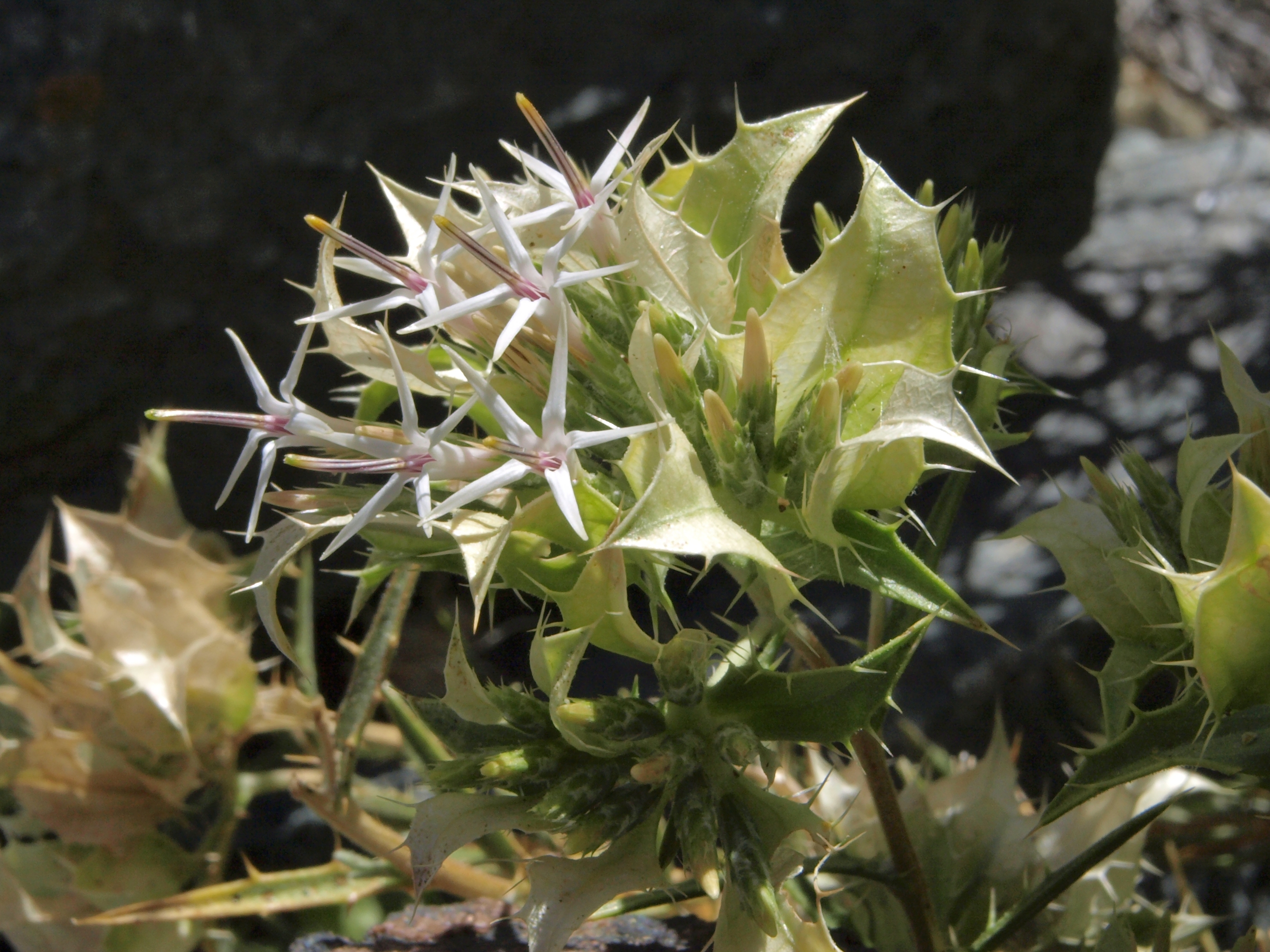
- Hecastocleis shockleyi flowering heads

Conservation status
- Apparently Secure (NatureServe)

Scientific classification
- Kingdom: Plantae
- Clade: Tracheophytes
- Clade: Angiosperms
- Clade: Eudicots
- Clade: Asterids
- Order: Asterales
- Family: Asteraceae
- Subfamily: Hecastocleidoideae; Panero & V.A.Funk
- Tribe: Hecastocleideae; Panero & V.A.Funk
- Genus: Hecastocleis; A.Gray
- Species: H. shockleyi

Binomial name
- Hecastocleis shockleyi A.Gray

= Hecastocleis =

Genus of flowering plants

Hecastocleis is a genus of low thorny shrubs with stiff branches, assigned to the daisy family. At the tip of each of the branches, inflorescences are subtended by oval, thorny, whitish to greenish bracts that enclose several flower heads which each contain only one pinkish bud, opening into a white corolla. It contains but one species, Hecastocleis shockleyi, the only representative of the tribe Hecastocleideae, and of the subfamily Hecastocleidoideae. Its vernacular name is prickleleaf. It is confined to the southwestern United States.

== Description ==
Hecastocleis shockleyi is a xerophytic thorny shrub of 40–70 cm (1.3–2.3 ft), occasionally 1 1/2 m (4 ft 11 in) high. It has sixteen chromosomes (2n=16).

=== Leaves ===
The leaves are alternately set along the branches. The leaf blades are hairless or with a few soft hairs, slightly olive green, stiff and leathery, with three main veins, linear to narrowly ovate in shape, 1–4 cm (0.39–1.57 in) long, their base approximately clasping the branch, with thickened margins usually carrying three to six spines of 1–3 mm (0.039–0.118 in) long, denser spaced near the base, while the tip is more or less abruptly tapering into a point.

=== Inflorescence ===
The complex inflorescences are carried at the end of the branches. These consist of a number of crowded clusters. Each of the clusters is subtended by white to yellowish green, wavy, ovate to orbicular bracts that have a spiny margin, and further consist of one to five flower heads which each contain only a single disk floret. The most outward part of the flower head is the involucre, which is narrowly vase-shaped to cylindric and approximately 1 cm (0.39 in) high, and consists of about six whorls of four bracts called phyllaries, which have often soft woolly hairs around the edge. The base of the flower head (or receptacle) is flat and lacks a bract directly at the base of the floret. The corolla of the florets is pinkish purple when still in bud, but turns pinkish white at flowering, at which time it is about 1 cm (0.39 in) high. These are hermaphrodite, star-symmetric (or actinomorphic), and have five narrow outwards oriented lobes. The five pinkish purple anthers are fused into a long tube, that initially covers the entire style. The bone-colored style grows through the anther tube, collecting the pollen on hairs, and displaying it above the anter tube like in all other Asteraceae. The style branches are only 0.1–0.5 mm and have rounded tips. At the base of the corolla the one-seeded indehiscent fruit (called cypselas) develops, which is not flattened, has four to five hardly visible nerves, turns brown and has lost any hairs when ripe, and is about 1/2 cm (0.2 in) high. On the top of the cypselas is a crown of six unequal scales (the pappus) of 1–2 mm high. These scales are lanceolate in shape, may have several teeth and are sometimes fused at their base, so forming a crown. The pollen of Hecastocleis is yellow, unadorned and tricolpate.

== Differences with other Asteraceae ==
Like Hecastocleis, some other Asteraceae also have flower heads consisting of a single floret, such as Gundelia, a perennial herbaceous plant from the Middle-East, and Gymnarrhena a winter annual from northern Africa and the Middle-East. Both have male flowers and female flowers, not hermaphrodite as in Hecastocleis, while Gymnarrhena has (trimerous or) tetramerous male florets, not pentamerous.

== Taxonomy ==
Hecastocleis shockleyi was described by Asa Gray in 1882 and placed it to the tribe Mutisieae. Kåre Bremer in 1994 assigned it to the subtribe Mutisiinae, while Hind in 2006 erected its own group within the Mutisieae.

=== Modern classification ===
Scholars agree that Hecastocleis occupies a very isolated position on the evolutionary grade of subfamilies of the Asteraceae, and this is expressed by the erection of the monotypic subfamily Hecastocleidoideae.

=== Phylogeny ===
The current insights in the relationships between Hecastocleis and its closest relatives, as based on genetic analysis, is expressed in the following tree.

- - Gochnatioideae
  - - Hecastocleis shockleyi
    - - Carduoideae
      - Pertyoideae, Gymnarrhenoideae, Cichorioideae, Corymbioideae, Asteroideae

=== Biogeology ===
Earlier splits of the Asteraceae tree are supposed to have taken place in southern South America. The splits that occur later than Hecastocleis have occurred Africa, especially southern Africa, and some may also have occurred in Asia. This implies that the common ancestor of Hecastocleis and all later branches moved from South America to North American and after the split with Hecastocleis, the ancestor of the remainder of the subfamilies arrived in Africa from North-America. Alternatively, only the ancestor of Hecastocleis migrated from South America to North America while the ancestor of the remainder was distributed from South America to Africa. The placement of Hecastocleis in the tree could also be incorrect due to parallel evolution and reversal of earlier mutations. However, the support in the analysis for the separation of Hecastocleis from the Gochnatieae is strong.

=== Etymology ===
The name of the genus Hecastocleis is the contraction of two Greek words, ἕκαστος (hekastos) meaning "each" and κλειω (kleio) which is said to mean "to shut up", referring to each flower having its own involucre. An alternative meaning of kleio is "glory". The species was named shockleyi in honor of William Hillman Shockley, an early plant collector of the flora of Nevada and father of the co-inventor of the transistor William Shockley.

== Distribution ==
Prickleleaf is native to the desert plains and mountains of eastern California (Inyo, Mono, Kern, and San Bernardino Counties) and southern Nevada (Mineral, Esmeralda, Nye, Lincoln, and Clark Counties), where it grows on arid, rocky slopes and flats. Records of this plant include Mount Charleston, Nevada Test Site, Grapevine Mountains and Red Pass.

== Ecology ==
In the mountains rimming the north-side of Death Valley, Hecastocleis shockleyi may be one of the dominant shrubs together with Atriplex confertifolia, Eriogonum fasciculatum, and Tetradymia axillaris. Less dominant but often present shrubs are Ephedra viridis, Ericameria laricifolia, and Lepidium fremontii. Trees are absent. Herbaceous plants form an open layer and regularly include the grasses Achnatherum hymenoides, Bromus rubens and Poa secunda, in addition to Claytonia perfoliata, Cryptantha utahensis, Delphinium parishii, several Gilia species, and Phacelia vallis-mortae. Biological soil crust, lichen, and moss can also be found in this plant community. It is found primarily on steep, very rocky slopes and bedrock outcrops with northerly aspects. Hecastocleis shockleyi occurs at altitudes between 1,250 and 1,600 m (4,100 and 5,250 ft). It typically grows on calcareous clay loam, loamy sand, or sandy clay that has resulted from erosion of dolomite, limestone or shale, and is poor in nutrients. Pollination of Hecastocleis has not yet been observed, but as its flowers are white, nocturnal insects are likely candidates.
