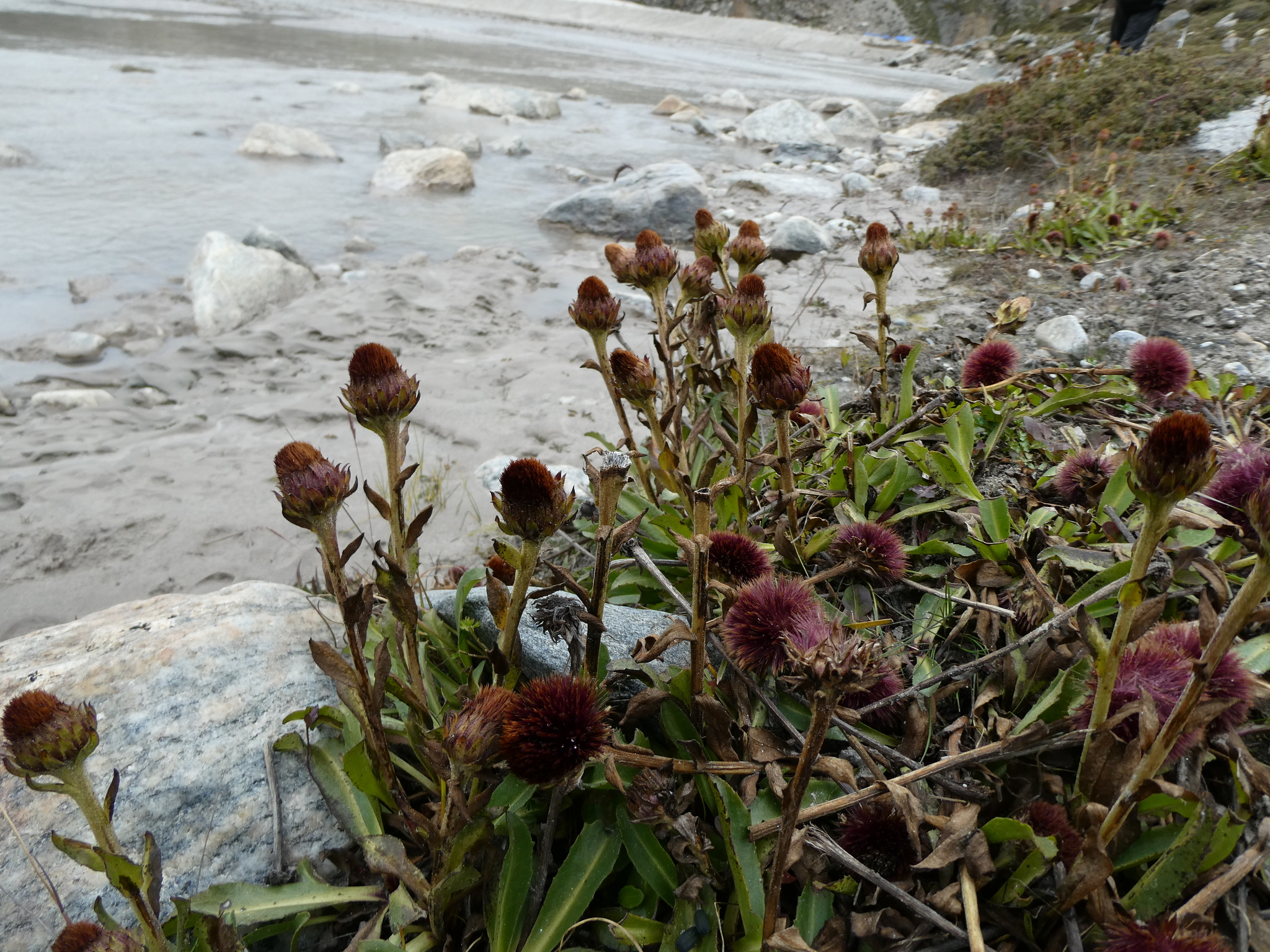

Scientific classification
- Kingdom: Plantae
- Clade: Embryophytes
- Clade: Tracheophytes
- Clade: Angiosperms
- Clade: Eudicots
- Clade: Asterids
- Order: Asterales
- Family: Asteraceae
- Subfamily: Gymnarrhenoideae
- Tribe: Gymnarrheneae
- Genus: Cavea; W.W.Sm. & J.Small
- Species: C. tanguensis

Binomial name
- Cavea tanguensis (J.R.Drumm.) W.W.Sm. & J.Small

Synonyms
- Saussurea tanguensis J.R.Drumm.

= Cavea tanguensis =

Species of flowering plant

Cavea is a low perennial herbaceous plant that is assigned to the family Asteraceae. Cavea tanguensis is currently the only species assigned to this genus. It has a basal rosette of entire, slightly leathery leaves, and stems of 5–25 cm high, topped by bowl-shaped flower heads with many slender florets with long pappus and purplish corollas. The vernacular name in Chinese is 葶菊 (ting ju). It grows high in the mountains of Bhutan, China (Sichuan), India (Sikkim), Nepal and Tibet, and flowers in July and August.

== Description ==
Cavea is a perennial herb with stout, woody and mostly branched rootstocks of 10–30 cm long, which carry a basal leaf rosette and unbranching stems that carry some smaller leaves, bracts and flower heads.

=== Stems and leaves ===
The erect unbranching stems are stout and 5–25 cm high. The leaves in the basal rosette are somewhat leathery or even fleshy, the underside with many or few brownish glandular hairs, elongated spoon-shaped, 1 1/2–6 or exceptionally 12 cm long and 1/2–1 cm wide, at the base gradually narrowing to the main vein, the edge with some teeth far apart, and a blunt tip or almost pointy. The leaves on the stem have brownish glandular hairs, with some saw-like teeth and a blunt tip. The lower leaves on the stem are 3–6 cm long and 1/2–1¼ cm wide. Leaves become smaller and less leathery or fleshy further up, with the highest bract-like, up to 1 1/2 cm, almost vertically oriented and enveloping the base of the flower heads.

=== Inflorescence ===
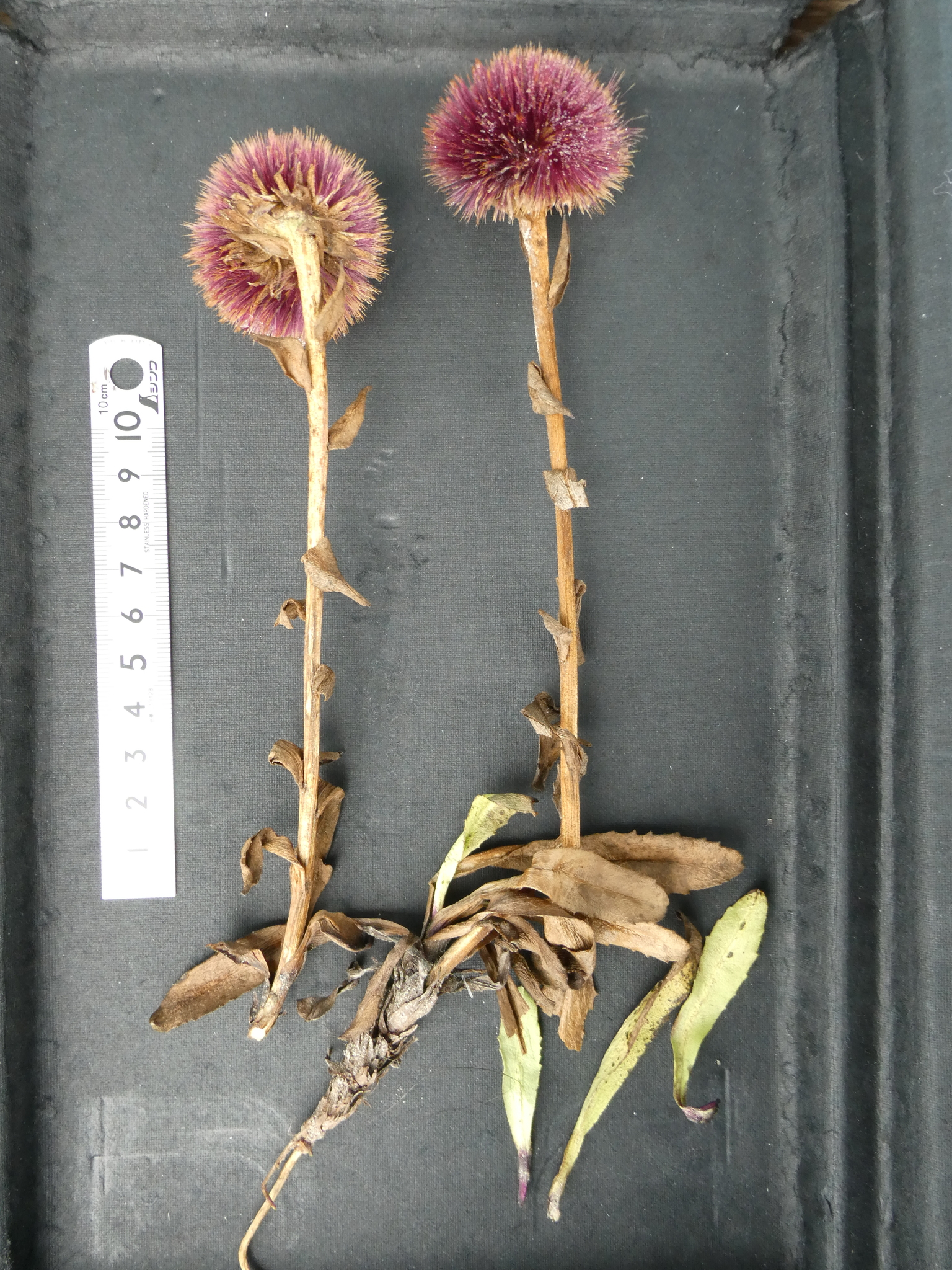
dried specimen

Flower heads mostly contain relatively few male florets at the centre, encircled by many more female florets. However solely female flower heads also occur, and individual plants may even produce only female flower heads. The flower heads are individually set at the end of the branches, bowl-shaped and mostly 3–3 1/2 cm across. The involucre is 1 1/2–2 cm high, nearly reaching the mouth of the florets, with four to five whorls of leaf-like bracts, the outermost bracts largest, which are long to very long ovate in shape linear-oblong or obovate-lanceolate, their margin with some glandular hairs, and a stump to pointy tip. The common base of the floret is flat or somewhat convex, and is without bracts subtending individual florets. Each flower head contains a hundred to two hundred very slender disk florets. There are usually, twenty to thirty male florets at the centre of a flower head, which are tube- to bell-shaped, with five lobes, the tube being about 4 1/2 mm long, and the free part of the lobes about 4 mm long. In the male florets, the stigma does not split into lobes. The sterile cypselae are about 11 mm long, hairless except for one whorl of pappus hairs of about 5 mm at the tip. The female florets are purplish in color, tube-shaped, densely covered in hard white hairs, with a tube of about 7 mm long and lobes of less than ¼ mm. In the female florets, the stigmas have two lobes, the lobes being exserted inside the corolla tube. The cypselae in the female florets are slender, angular cylindrical, 5–6 mm, set with dense bristles and two whorls of about fifty rough, purple pappus hairs of about 7 1/2 mm. Flowers are present in July and August, while ripe fruits can be found in September and October.

=== Pollen ===
The pollen grains are about 35 μm in diameter, slightly flattened at the poles, with three longitudinal slits that suddenly stop near the poles. The surface is densely covered in conical spines of 2–4 1/2 μm high and 1 3/4–2 1/2 μm wide at the base, slightly perforated at base, and with pointy tips.

== Taxonomy ==
The species was initially described in 1910 as Saussurea tanguensis by James Ramsay Drummond, a British civil servant and amateur botanist living in India. However, William Wright Smith and John Kunkel Small in 1917 considered it too different from other Saussurea species and erected the new genus Cavea for it. The placement of Cavea within the daisy family has been difficult. In older literature it was placed with the Inuleae, however in 1977 it was removed from that tribe because the morphology of the pollen was too different. Arne Anderberg considered the species might be a relative of Saussurea, which he placed in the Cardueae. C. Jeffrey in 2007 had reservations, but preliminary placed it in the Cardueae. Recent genetic analysis suggests it could be best assigned to the Gymnarrhenoideae. Few morphological features would support this assignment, other than both having two types of flower heads and sharing a tendency towards dioecism. Both also have basal leaf rosettes, stretched leaves, with few spaced teeth on the margin, and both lack spines and latex.

=== Modern classification ===
Gymnarrhena micrantha is now considered the sister taxon of Cavea tanguensis, who together constitute the tribe Gymnarrheneae and the subfamily Gymnarrhenoideae.

=== Phylogeny ===
Based on recent genetic analysis, it is now generally accepted that the Pertyoideae subfamily is sister to a clade that has as its basal member the Gymnarrhenoideae, and further consists of the Asteroideae, Corymbioideae and Cichorioideae. These three subfamilies share a deletion of nine base-pairs in the ndhF gene which is not present in Gymnarrhena micrantha. Current insights in the relationships of Cavea and Gymnarrhena to the closest Asterid subfamilies is represented by the following tree.

- - subfamily Pertyoideae
  - - subfamily Gymnarrhenoideae
      - Gymnarrhena micrantha
      - Cavea tanguensis
    - - subfamily Cichorioideae
      - - subfamily Corymbioideae
        - subfamily Asteroideae

=== Etymology ===
Cavea is named after George Cave, who was the curator of the Lloyd's Botanical Garden in Darjeeling, and who collected many new plants from all over Sikkim.

== Distribution ==
This plant can be found in Bhutan, Nepal, southwestern Sichuan, Sikkim, and Tibet.

== Habitat ==
Cavea grows on gravelly substrate near glaciers and streams at altitudes between 4000 and 5100 m.

== Use ==
Leaves are used on wounds, and to suppress fever. In traditional Tibetan medicin, the species is known as ming-chen-nag-po.
