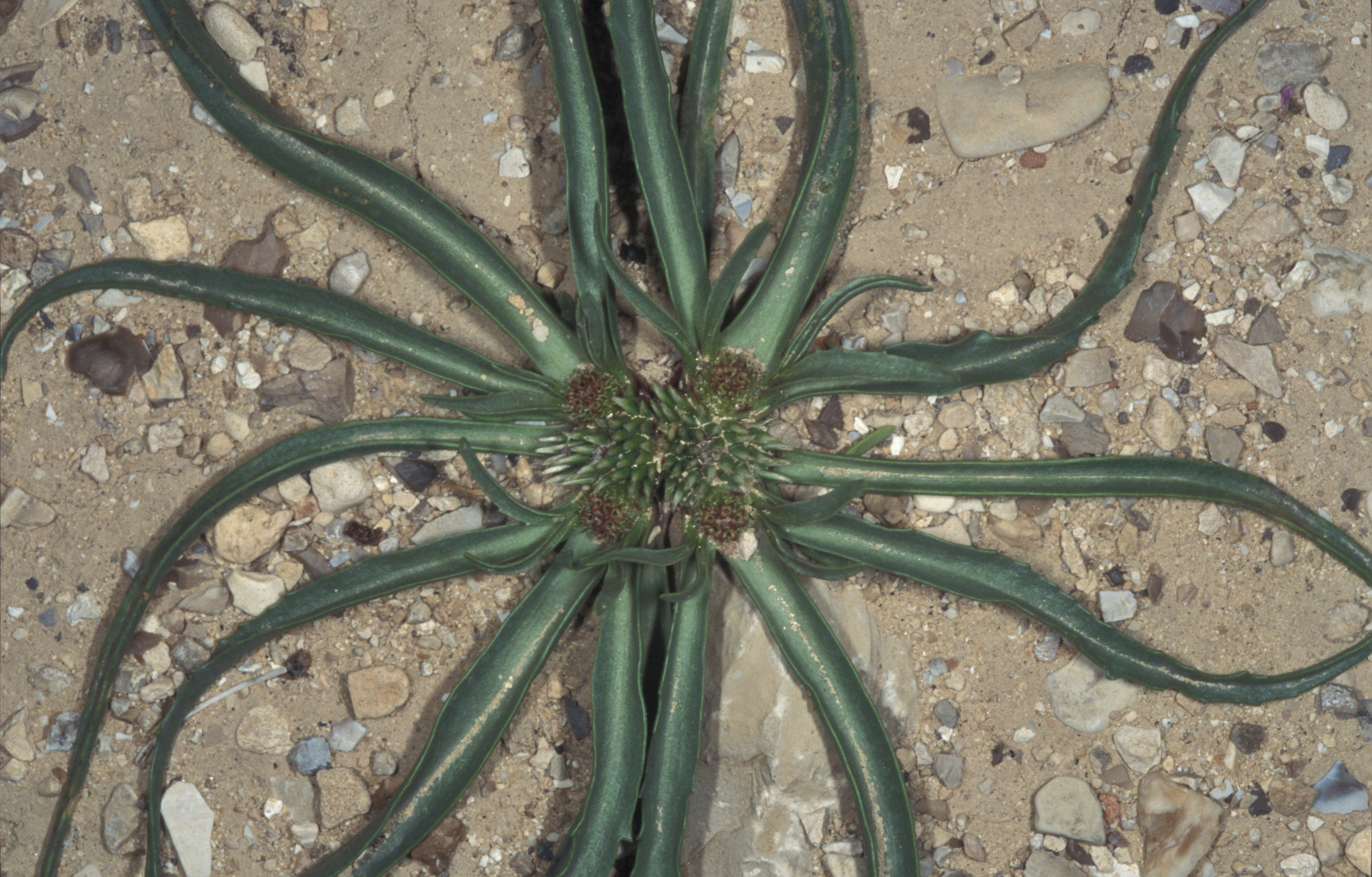

Scientific classification
- Kingdom: Plantae
- Clade: Tracheophytes
- Clade: Angiosperms
- Clade: Eudicots
- Clade: Asterids
- Order: Asterales
- Family: Asteraceae
- Subfamily: Gymnarrhenoideae
- Tribe: Gymnarrheneae
- Genus: Gymnarrhena; Desf.
- Species: G. micrantha

Binomial name
- Gymnarrhena micrantha Desf.

Synonyms
- Cryptadia Lindl. ex Endl. (1841); Frankia Steud. (1840); Cryptadia euphratensis Lindl. (1868); Frankia schimperi Steud. (1840); Gymnarrhena balansae Coss. & Durieu ex Coss. & Kralik (1857)

= Gymnarrhena =

Genus of flowering plants

Gymnarrhena is a deviant genus of plants in the family Asteraceae, with only one known species, Gymnarrhena micrantha. It is native to North Africa and the Middle East, as far east as Balochistan. Together with the very different Cavea tanguensis, it constitutes the tribe Gymnarrheneae, and the subfamily Gymnarrhenoideae.

Gymnarrhena is a small, flowering, winter annual with a rosette of simple, narrow leaves and flower heads cropped at its heart. It does not contain latex and does not carry spines. Gymnarrhena flowers in March and April. One of the common names in Arabic is كَف الكَلْب meaning "dog's footprint", while in Hebrew it is called מוצנית קטנת-פרחים meaning "small chaff flower".

== Description ==
Gymnarrhena micrantha is a dwarf annual herb of ½–2½ cm high, with all its leaves in rosette of up to 10 cm in diameter, and its flowers tucked away in the heart of this rosette, that is lacking latex, and does not have thorns. Two sources report twenty chromosomes (2n=20), but one other publication says eighteen (2n=18).

=== Leaves ===
The leaves are simple and are arranged in a dense basal rosette. They are narrowly lanceolate to narrowly ovate in shape, more or less V-shaped in cross-section, lack leaf stalks and have a smooth surface. The tip is pointy or gradually narrowing. The leaf margins may carry some small, distanced teeth.

=== Subterranean flower heads ===
The flower heads that develop underneath the leaves do not open and are self-pollinated. Each floret is fully enclosed in its involucral bracts, and the corolla shows very little development. The cypselas are relatively large and flattened, blackish in color, with ample hairs, and remain below the soil surface after the plant has died. Any pappus consists of somewhat scale-like bristles, hardly developed or is entirely absent.

=== Aerial flower heads ===
The aerial flower heads are congested in the center of the leaf rosette, more or less arranged as a low cauliflower. Groups of florets are either functionally male or functionally female. The involucral bracts are overlapping in several series, papery, whitish and have a pointy tip. The aerial flower heads have some semblance to a hedgehog and the hard, dry plants hurt the naked foot if stepped upon.

==== Male florets ====
The functionally male florets occur in small groups and have very short individual stems, mostly in the centre of a larger cluster of female florets. The corollas are small, have (three or) four triangular lobes, greenish yellow and contain (three or) four stamens, carry yellowish or purplish anthers that are blunt on both ends and the filament is not extended beyond the anther. The fruit at the base of the male flower is much reduced and void, and pappus may consist of some irregular scales or be entirely abstent. Pollen is globe-shaped and has three sunken furrows (a type called tricolpate). These furrows have sharp ends and do not merge at the poles. The pollen has some unevenly distributed hollow spines, which are conical with a somewhat swollen base and a pointed tip, 1—2 μm high.

==== Female florets and fruits ====
The functionally female florets are each stiffly enclosed by a large, cone-shaped green and white bract, and clustered with other one-flowered female flower heads, mostly surrounding groups of male florets. The inconspicuous corolla consists of whitish threads and surrounds the base of a whitish style with long arms which have rounded tips. The one-seeded indehiscent fruit (or cypsela) of the female florets are tiny, ovoid, with rows of stiff hairs on the ribs, and felty overall with long twin hairs, which have thin cell walls. The pappus on top consists of scales ending in a long drawn tip and with a row of hairs along the edges.

=== Characters in common with Cavea ===
Gymnarrhena is most related to Cavea, but few morphological features would support this assignment, other than both having two types of flower heads and sharing a tendency towards dioecism. Both also have basal leaf rosettes, stretched leaves, with few spaced teeth on the margin, and both lack spines and latex.

=== Differences with other Asteraceae ===
Gymnarrhena has aerial inflorescences that consist of many individual flower heads with disk florets which are either functionally male, with few florets each, or female with one floret only. This is a rare character combination, that is further known from the inflorescences of Gundelia. The latter however is a much larger, erect, thistle-like plant, which has latex and pentamerous florets. In Gymnarrhena the male florets (the only ones where a judgement can be made without enlargement) are (tri- or) tetramerous. The vast majority of Asteraceae have pentamerous florets, and several to many florets per flower head. Other asterids that have flower heads with only one floret are Corymbium, Hecastocleis shockleyi, Stifftia uniflora and Fulcaldea laurifolia, but these are pentamerous and hermaphrodite.

== Taxonomy ==
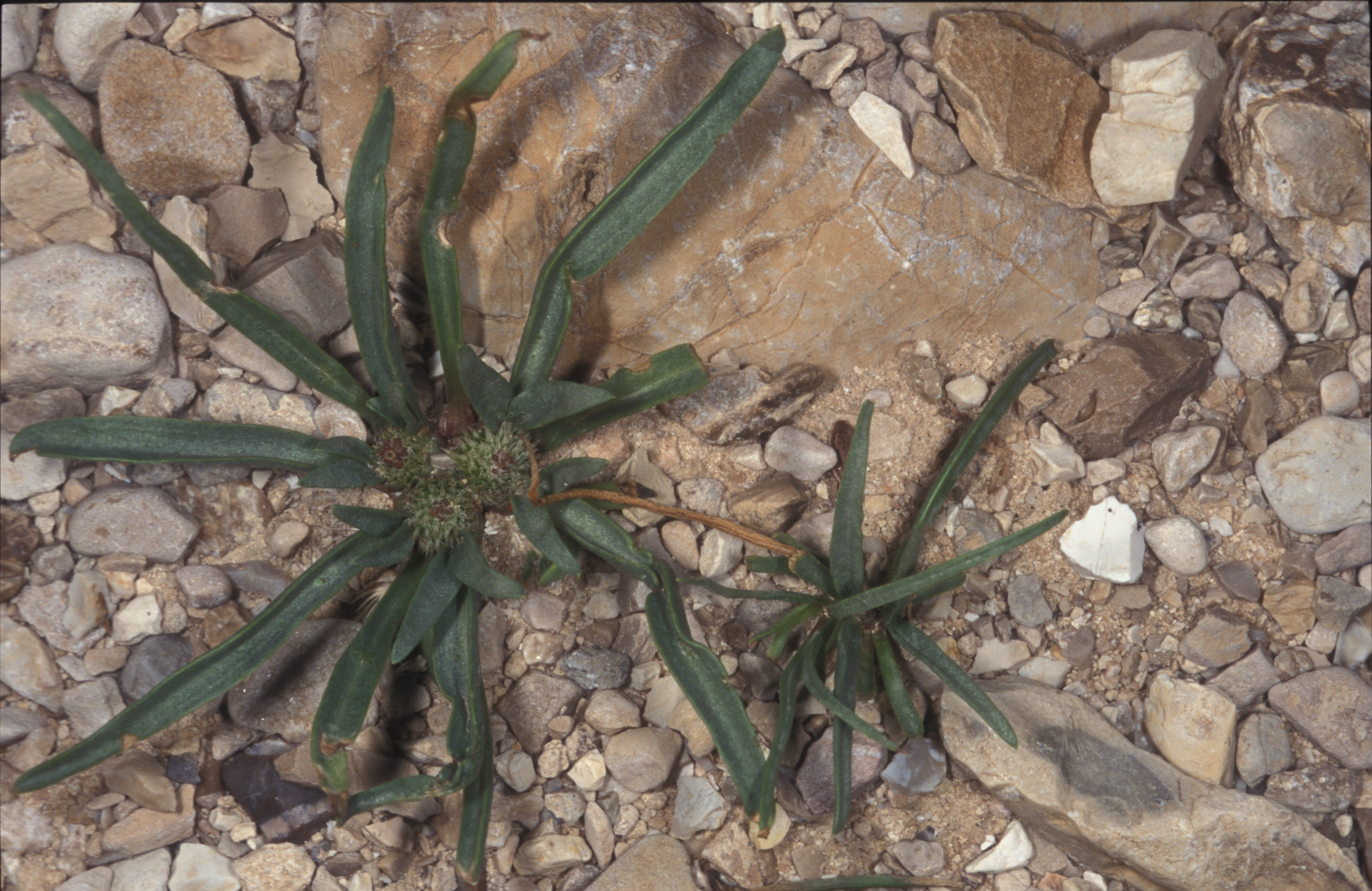
specimens with and without aerial flowers

Gymnarrhena micrantha was first described by René Louiche Desfontaines in 1818. In 1857, a second species, G. balansae was distinguished by Ernest Cosson and Michel Charles Durieu de Maisonneuve, but it is doubtful this form from Algeria is sufficiently different. In 1868, the name Cryptadia euphratensis, with a description by John Lindley, was published, but this name was later synonymised with G. micrantha.

The unusual morphology of Gymnarrhena has made it difficult for taxonomists to make a solid assignment. Bentham, Hoffmann, and Cronquist put this genus in the Inuleae tribe in its widest circumscription, while both Hoffmann and Cronquist note Gymnarrhena is similar to Geigeria. In 1973, Peter Leins thought the pollen of Gymnarrhena too different from the Inuleae and proposed a position in the Cardueae (Cynareae) tribe. John J. Skvarla, Billie Lee Turner, and their colleagues in 1977 agreed that Gymnarrhena has some traits in common with the Cynareae but a pollen type that cannot be found in the Inuleae tribe. Kåre Bremer in his 1994 book Asteraceae: Cladistics & Classification included Gymnarrhena in the Cichorioideae, but without clarifying its position in this tribe.

=== Modern classification ===
Gymnarrhena micrantha is now considered the sister group of Cavea tanguensis, who together constitute the tribe Gymnarrheneae and the subfamily Gymnarrhenoideae.

=== Phylogeny ===
Based on recent genetic analysis, it is now generally accepted that the Pertyoideae subfamily is sister to a clade that has as its basal member the Gymnarrhenoideae, and further consists of the Asteroideae, Corymbioideae and Cichorioideae. These three subfamilies share a deletion of nine base-pairs in the ndhF gene which is not present in Gymnarrhena micrantha. Current insights in the relationships of Gymnarrhena to the closest Asterid subfamilies are represented by the following tree.

- - subfamily Pertyoideae
  - - subfamily Gymnarrhenoideae
      - Gymnarrhena micrantha
      - Cavea tanguensis
    - - subfamily Cichorioideae
        - Warionia saharae
        - all other Cichorioideae
      - - subfamily Corymbioideae
        - subfamily Asteroideae

=== Evolutionary processes ===
The early production of few large seeds followed by production of many small seeds may have been the result of the variable and unpredictable growing season, fitting to a pioneer species.

=== Etymology ===
The genus name Gymnarrhena may be a contraction of two Greek words, γυμνός (gymnos) meaning "naked" and ἄῤῥην (arrhēn), "male", while the species epithet micrantha is a contraction of the Greek words μικρός (mikrós), "small" and ἄνθος (ánthos), "flower".

== Distribution and habitat ==
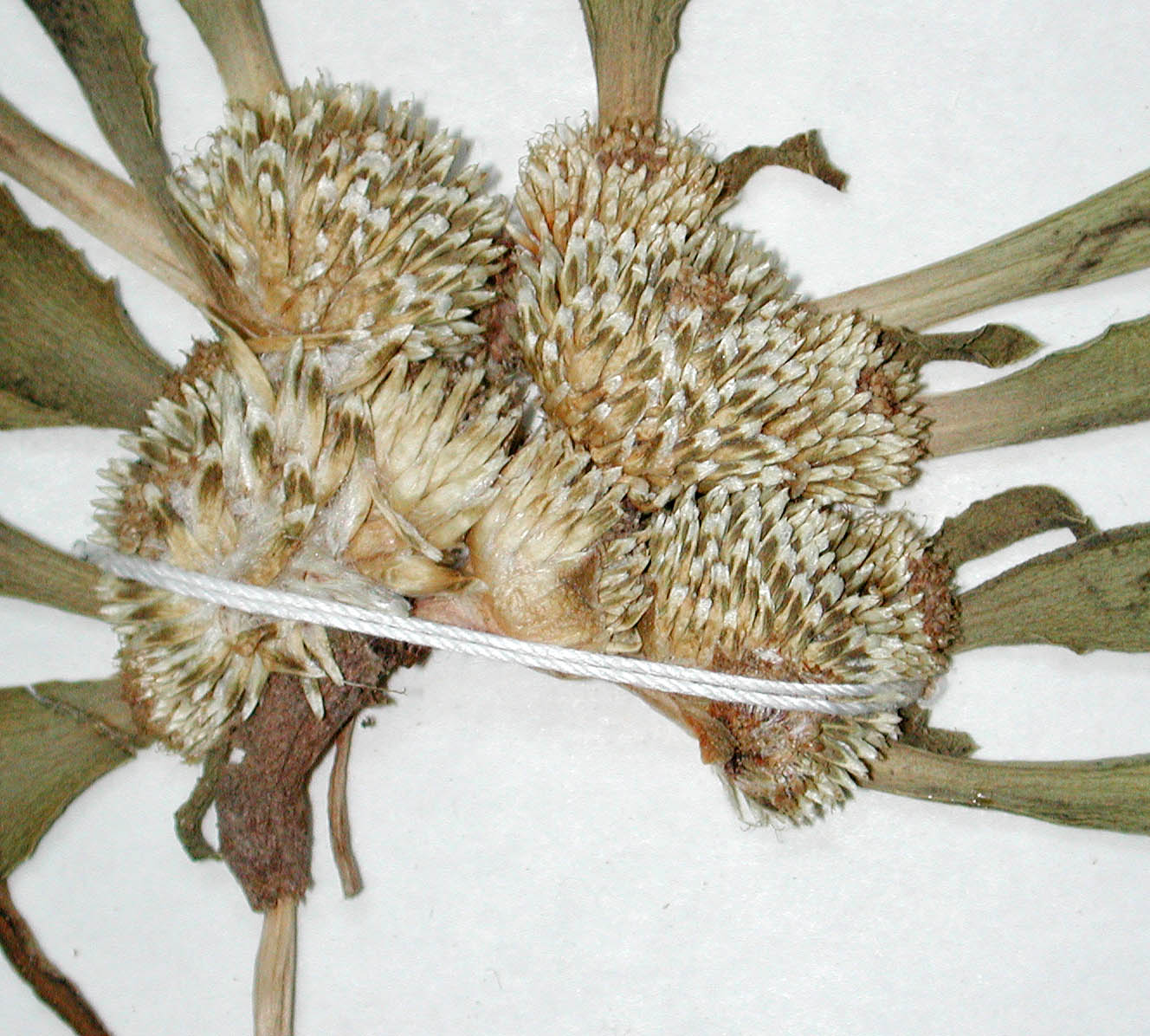
a herbarium specimen

Gymnarrhena is known from North Africa, such as Algeria and Egypt, the Middle-East, such as Sinai, Israel, Jordan, Siria, Kuwait, eastern Saudi Arabia, Qatar, the United Arab Emirates, Iraq, Iran and Pakistan (Balochistan). It grows on gravel plains, stony or rocky areas, in thin sandy deposits, alluvial plains and wadis.

== Ecology ==
Gymnarrhena is a dwarf herbaceous winter annual plant. It is said to be poisonous and animals appear to avoid it. It has aerial flowers in March, April and - when sufficient moisture is around - May. Already after four leaves have grown, underground flowerheads develop that produce few larger cypselas, followed later on by many small cypselas from the aerial flower heads for as long as moisture is available. When the plant dies down in summer, the cypselas remain encased between the hardened bracts, presumably safe from harvester ants. After the first rain, which usually occurs the next winter, the bracts and pappus on the aerial flowerheads unfold, and the cypselas are dispersed by the wind, while many are gathered by ants. The cypselas in the underground flowerheads however germinate through the dead parts of the flowerhead, and remain protected against the ants. These seeds increase the chance that the plant continues its presence in a location that was favorable in the previous year. Aerial cypselas on average only weigh 5–6% of a subterranean fruit. After six days, seedlings of subterranean fruits are six times larger than those of aerial fruits and their survival rate is much higher. In very dry years, only subterranean fruits may develop and aerial florets may be entirely absent.

Gymnarrhena is one of few species that grows where the sand has blown out from under tar tracks in Kuwait after the Gulf War, a strong confirmation of its ability to colonize disturbed habitat quickly. At Khirbet Faynan, in the southern Jordanian desert, Gymnarrhena grows on slag piles containing copper and lead and accumulates these heavy metals.
