= NADPH dehydrogenase (quinone) =

Identifiers
- EC no.: 1.6.5.10
- CAS no.: 37256-37-4

Databases
- BRENDA: enzyme data
- ExPASy: NiceZyme view
- KEGG: enzyme entry
- MetaCyc: metabolic pathway
- Rhea: reactions
- PDB structures: RCSB PDB PDBe PDBsum
- Gene Ontology: AmiGO / QuickGO
Search
- PMC: articles
- PubMed: articles
- NCBI: proteins

In enzymology, a NADPH dehydrogenase (quinone) (EC 1.6.5.10) is an enzyme that catalyzes the chemical reaction

NADPH + H^{+} + acceptor $\rightleftharpoons$ NADP^{+} + reduced acceptor

The 3 substrates of this enzyme are NADPH, H^{+}, and acceptor, whereas its two products are NADP^{+} and reduced acceptor.

This enzyme belongs to the family of oxidoreductases, specifically those acting on NADH or NADPH with other acceptors. The systematic name of this enzyme class is NADPH:(quinone-acceptor) oxidoreductase. Other names in common use include reduced nicotinamide adenine dinucleotide phosphate (quinone), dehydrogenase, NADPH oxidase, and NADPH2 dehydrogenase (quinone). It has 2 cofactors: FAD, and Flavoprotein. Several compounds are known to inhibit this enzyme, including Folate, and Dicumarol.

== Structural studies ==
As of late 2007, only one structure has been solved for this class of enzymes, with the PDB accession code PDB: 1F5V.

== See also ==
- NdhF
