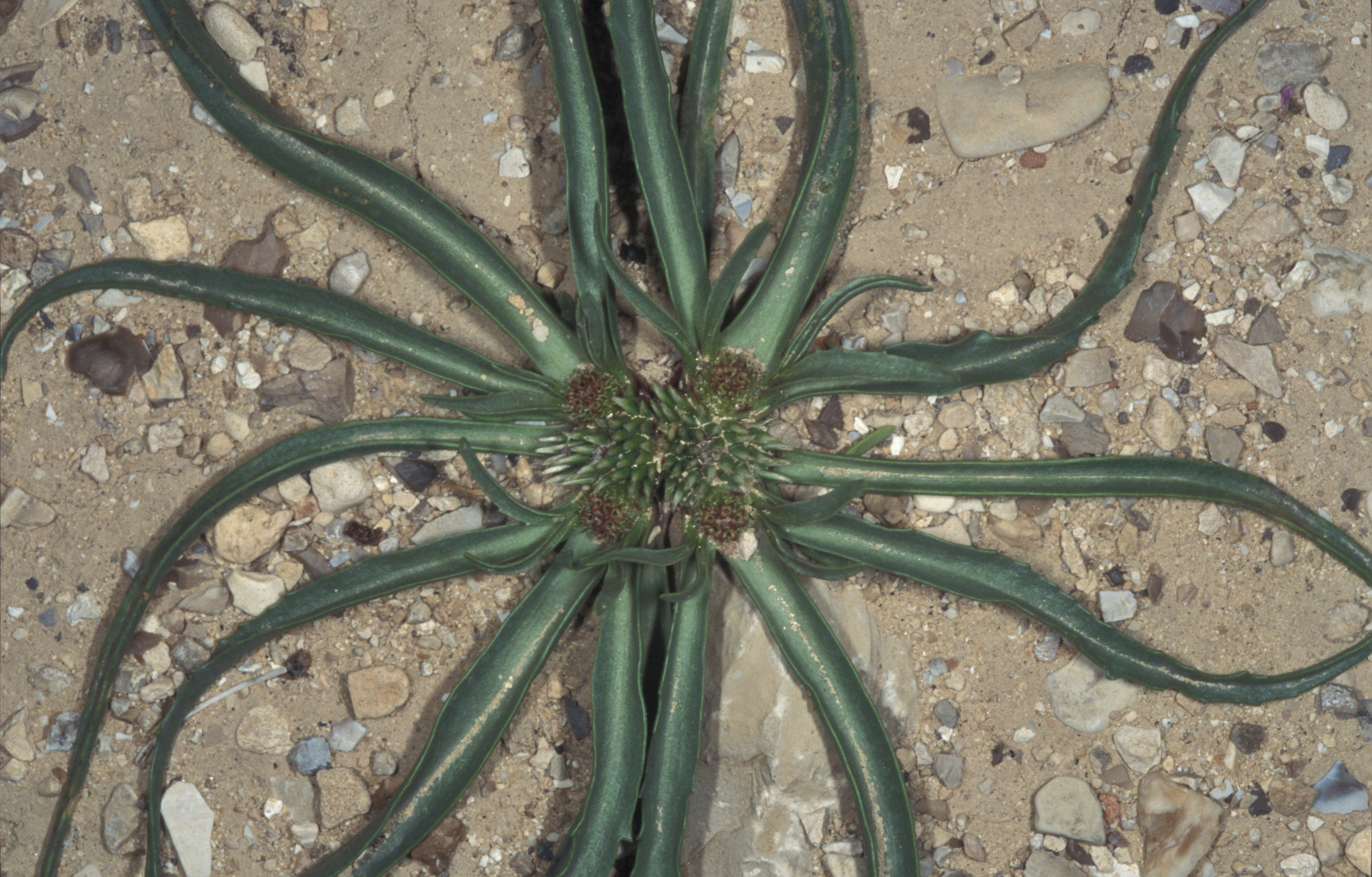
- Gymnarrhena micrantha

Scientific classification
- Kingdom: Plantae
- Clade: Tracheophytes
- Clade: Angiosperms
- Clade: Eudicots
- Clade: Asterids
- Order: Asterales
- Family: Asteraceae
- Subfamily: Gymnarrhenoideae; Panero & V.A.Funk
- Tribe: Gymnarrheneae; Panero & V.A.Funk

Genera
- Cavea; Gymnarrhena

= Gymnarrhenoideae =

Subfamily of flowering plants

Gymnarrhenoideae is a subfamily within the family Asteraceae, with only one tribe, the Gymnarrheneae. Two very different species have been assigned to it, Gymnarrhena micrantha, a winter annual from the deserts of North-Africa and the Middle-East, and Cavea tanguensis, a perennial herb that grows on scree near streams and glaciers in the Eastern Himalayas. These species have very little in common, other than having two types of flower heads and sharing a tendency towards dioecism. Both also have basal leaf rosettes, stretched leaves, with few spaced teeth on the margin, and both lack spines and latex.

== Taxonomy ==
The subfamily Gymnarrhenoideae and tribe Gymnarrheneae were erected in 2009 by Jose Panero and Vicki Funk to accommodate the isolated position of Gymnarrhena that is suggested by genetic analyses. A later analysis including rare species from China illustrated that Cavea is its sister taxon.

=== Phylogeny ===
Based on recent genetic analysis, it is now generally accepted that the Pertyoideae subfamily is sister to a clade that has as its basal member the Gymnarrhenoideae, and further consists of the Asteroideae, Corymbioideae and Cichorioideae. These three subfamilies share a deletion of nine base-pairs in the ndhF gene which is not present in Gymnarrhena micrantha. Current insights in the relationships of Gymnarrhena to the closest Asterid subfamilies is represented by the following tree.

- - subfamily Pertyoideae
  - - subfamily Gymnarrhenoideae
      - Gymnarrhena micrantha
      - Cavea tanguensis
    - - subfamily Cichorioideae
        - Warionia saharae
        - all other Cichorioideae
      - - subfamily Corymbioideae
        - subfamily Asteroideae
