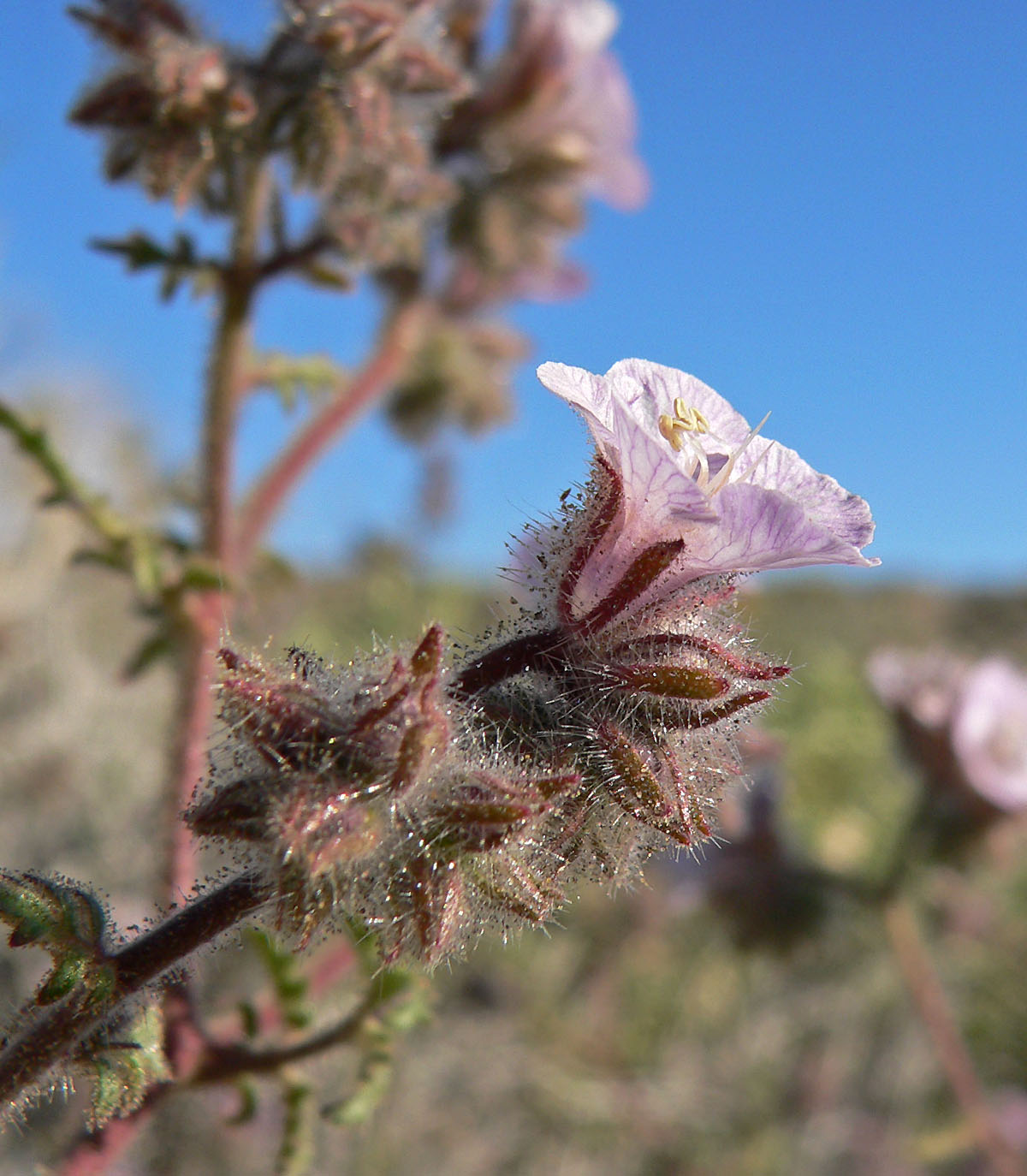

Conservation status
- Secure (NatureServe)

Scientific classification
- Kingdom: Plantae
- Clade: Tracheophytes
- Clade: Angiosperms
- Clade: Eudicots
- Clade: Asterids
- Order: Boraginales
- Family: Hydrophyllaceae
- Genus: Phacelia
- Species: P. vallis-mortae

Binomial name
- Phacelia vallis-mortae J.Voss

= Phacelia vallis-mortae =

Species of plant

Phacelia vallis-mortae is a species of flowering plant in the family Hydrophyllaceae, known by the common name Death Valley phacelia. It is native to the southwestern United States, where it grows in deserts such as Death Valley, and mountain, plateau, and valley scrub habitat.

It is an annual herb growing up to 60 centimeters tall with a branching or unbranched stem. It is coated in soft and stiff hairs. The leaves are up to 8 centimeters long and most are compound, divided into smaller leaflets lined with teeth or lobes. The hairy inflorescence is a one-sided curving or coiling cyme of bell-shaped flowers. Each flower 1 to 1.5 centimeters long and a shade of lavender or purple, surrounded by a calyx of narrow sepals coated in long hairs.
