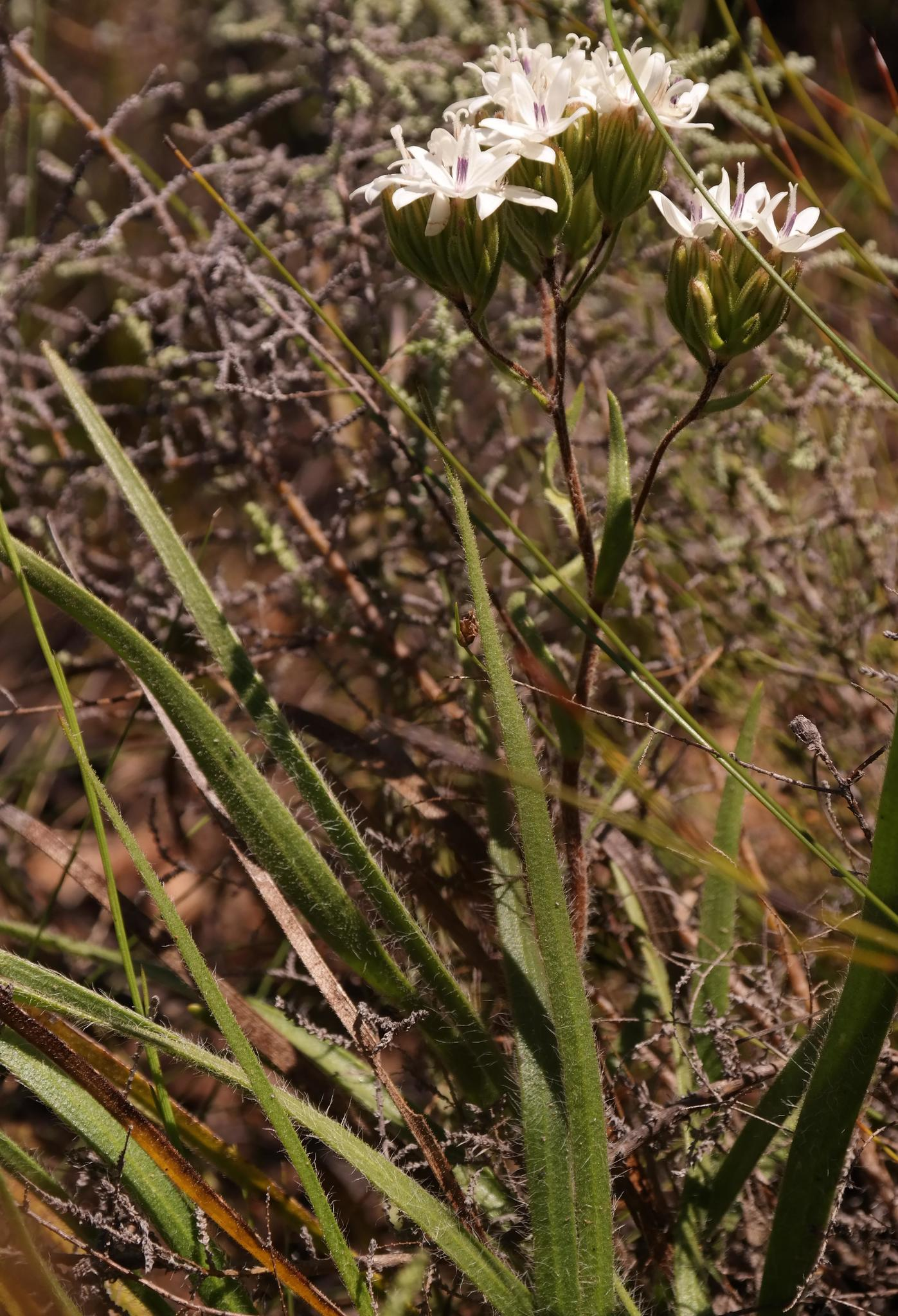
- Corymbium villosum

Scientific classification
- Kingdom: Plantae
- Clade: Embryophytes
- Clade: Tracheophytes
- Clade: Angiosperms
- Clade: Eudicots
- Clade: Asterids
- Order: Asterales
- Family: Asteraceae
- Subfamily: Corymbioideae; Panero & V.A.Funk
- Tribe: Corymbieae; Panero & V.A.Funk
- Genus: Corymbium; L.

Type species
- Corymbium africanum L.

Synonyms
- Contarena Adans.

= Corymbium =

Genus of perennial plants from South Africa

Corymbium is a genus of flowering plants in the daisy family comprising nine species. It is the only genus in the subfamily Corymbioideae and the tribe Corymbieae. The species have leaves with parallel veins, strongly reminiscent of monocots, in a rosette and compounded inflorescences may be compact or loosely composed racemes, panicles or corymbs. Remarkable for species in the daisy family, each flower head contains just one, bisexual, mauve, pink or white disc floret within a sheath consisting of just two large involucral bracts. The species are all endemic to the Cape Floristic Region of South Africa, where they are known as plampers.

== Description ==
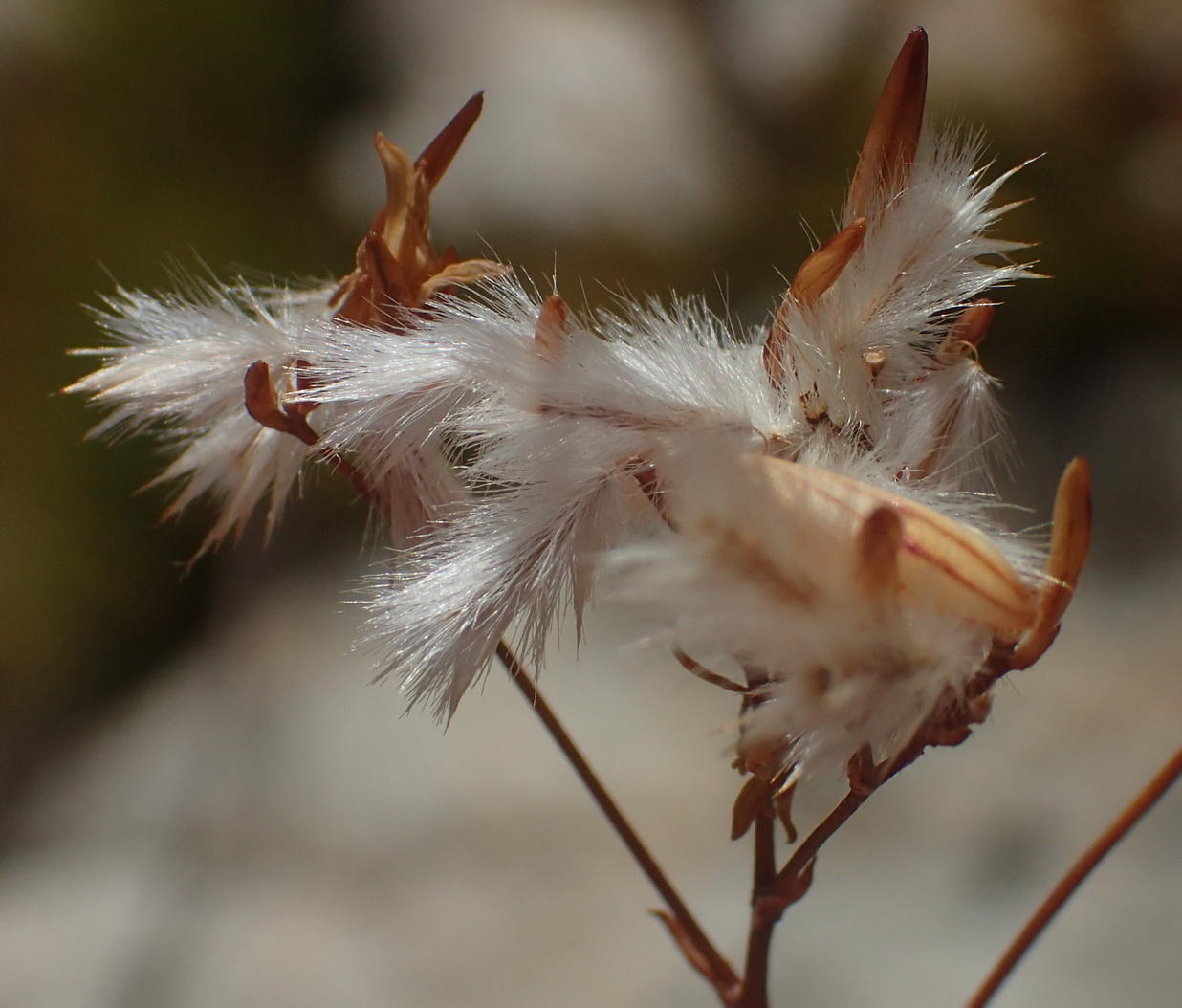
Corymbium has unusual long cypselae covered in very long hairs

The species of Corymbium are stemless, perennial, herbaceous plants of 5–60 cm (2.0–23.6 in) high, that grow in tufts and look like a monocotyledon as long as they are not flowering. The plants have a fibrous rhizome that is covered the persisting bases of old leaves and long, soft, silky hairs. Most parts of the plants may be covered in long soft hairs, or coarse hairs or lack indumentum. All leaves are in a basal rosette and lack a discernable stalk. If the leaves are covered with glandular hairs, they are sticky. The leaf blades may be circular in cross-section, flat or the margins may be curved upward, have a line-shaped to broadly elliptic or lance-shaped outline, with a pointy tip or tapering, the base much narrowed, like a leaf stalk. The leaf margins are entire. The leaves may have prominent or more or less obscured parallel veins, and the leaf surfaces may be hairless, or carry long soft or coarse hairs. The texture of the leaves may be cartilaginous, leathery or herbaceous. The flowers are at the end of one or several branching inflorescence stalks, that carry several bracts much smaller than the leaves, at least subtending each of the branches. These inflorescence stalks may be roughly hairy to hairless, and round or angular in cross-section. The compounded inflorescences may be compact or loosely composed racemes, panicles or corymbs. Each head is on a very short or long pedicel, except in C. cymosum, where it is absent.

Remarkably, each flower head contains just one, bisexual, mauve, pink or white disc floret. The florets are enveloped by two whorls of involucral bracts. The outer whorl consists of two or three short bracts at the base. The inner whorl consist of only two, much larger, hairless or coarsely hairy bracts that usually are green in colour with purple tips or entirely tinged purple. The inner bracts form a sheath around the tube of the floret. The outer of these two bracts clasps the inner one, is keeled, split in two or three at the very tip, has three parallel veins along its length. The florets have a 5-merous star-symmetrical trumpet-shaped corolla consisting of a short tube near the base and five longer, spreading, oblong to line-shaped lobes at the top, and all contain both male and female parts. In the center of the corolla are five stamens with free filaments and line-shaped anthers fused into a tube, through which the style grows when the floret opens. The anthers have a shortly arrow-shaped base and no appendages at the top. The style sticks beyond the corolla, is round in cross-section, and splits in two style branches, which are coarsely hairy on outer surface. The dry, indehiscent, one-seeded fruits called cypselae, are line-shaped to elliptic, flattened in cross-section, and covered in long soft or coarse hairs. On the top of the cypselae is a whorl of crown-like or free pappus bristles.

C. congestum has eight homologous sets of chromosomes (2n=16).

=== Species ===
The taxa within the genus Corymbium mainly differ in the width, indumentum, prominence of the veins of the leaves, the hairiness of the conflorescence stalk, the stalk of the individual flower head (pedicel), the hairiness of the involucral bracts, the shape of the tip of these bracts, and the colour of the florets. The species, subspecies and varieties that are currently recognised, and their distinguishing features are summarized in the following table. Features of subtaxa identical to the typical subtaxon are not repeated.

| Taxon | leaf shape, width | leaf indument, consistency, veins, margin | conflorescence type | conflorescence stalk indument | pedicel length | inner involucral bracts indument, tip | floret colour |
| C. a. africanum | linear to falcate, ≤5 mm | glabrous, coriaceous to cartilaginous, veins not prominent, flat or involute | panicle | scabrid | 1/2–1 mm | scabrid/viscid, fimbrate | mauve |
| C. a. scabridum scabridum | linear to falcate, ≥1 1/2 mm | glabrous, involute, sometimes flat | corymb | | | | mauve, pink or white with mauve style |
| C. a. scabridum fourcadei | linear, ≥5 mm | glabrous, flat, thickened margins | | | | | |
| C. a. scabridum gramineum | round in cross-section, ≤1 1/2 mm | glabrous | | | | | |
| C. congestum | broadly ellipse to lance-shaped, 8–44 mm | scabrid/viscid on both surfaces, herbaceous | clustered panicle | hispid | 1 1/2–2 mm | scabrid/viscid, trifid | mauve |
| C. cymosum | linear to falcate, 2 1/2–8 mm | glabrous, cartilaginous, finely impressed veins, flat to slightly involute | clustered corymb | glabrous or slightly muricate | absent | glabrous | white |
| C. elsiae | narrowly linear to falcate, 1 1/2–2 mm | glabrous, coriaceous, no prominent veins, sometimes canaliculate | panicle | scabrid, glandularly muricate | present | scabrid, glandularly muricate, trifid or fimbriate | mauve |
| C. enerve | linear to falcate, 3 1/2–18 1/2 mm | slightly muricate, coriaceous, finely impressed veins, flat, thickened margins | clustered corymb | scabrid | present | glabrous | white or pink |
| C. glabrum glabrum | linear, sometimes falcate, ≥2 mm | glabrous, rigid, prominent veins | clustered corymb or panicle | glabrous | 1/2–1 mm | glabrous, fimbrate | mauve |
| C. glabrum rodgersii | filiform, ≤2 mm | | clustered corymb | | | | |
| C. laxum laxum | narrowly linear to sub-falcate, 1 1/2–3 1/2 mm | silky hairy, coriaceous, no prominent veins, involute, sometimes canaliculate | lax panicle of individual heads, dichotomous branching more than halfway down | glabrous | present | glabrous, fimbrate | mauve |
| C. laxum bolusii | narrowly linear to sub-falcate, ±1.6 mm | | lax panicle of individual heads, dichotomous branching less than halfway down | | | | |
| C. theileri | linear to falcate, 3 1/2–8 mm | glabrous, cartilaginous, prominent veins, thickened margin | panicle of corymbose clusters | scabrid, villous at base | ±1 mm | scabrid/viscid, trifid | mauve |
| C. villosum | linear to sub-falcate, 2 1/2–9 1/4 mm | villous/viscid on both surfaces, herbaceous | clustered corymb | villous/viscid | 1–2 mm | scabrid/viscid, irregularly trifid | white |

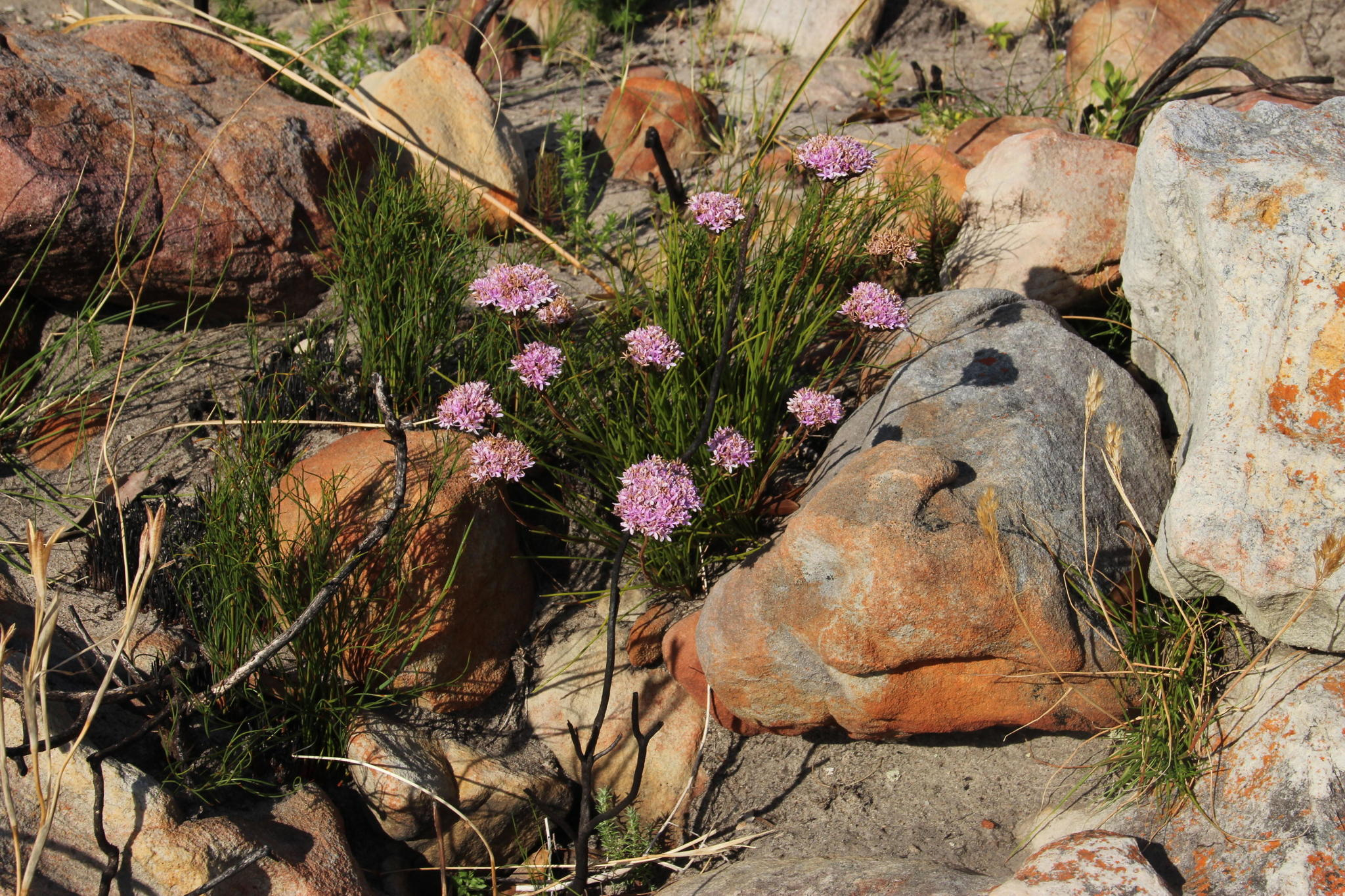
Corymbium africanum subsp. scabridum, habit

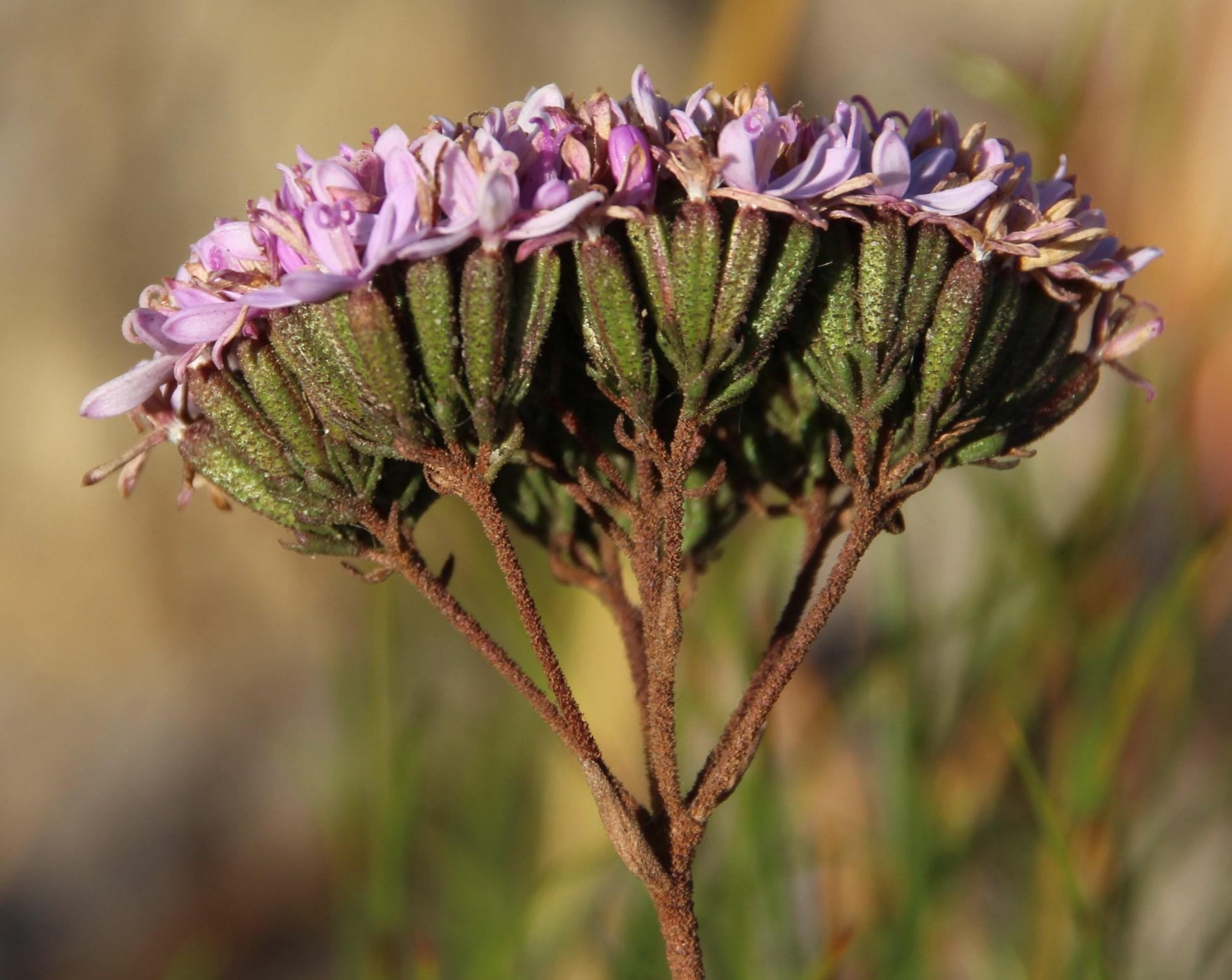
C. africanum subsp. scabridum, showing roughly hairy inflorescence stalk and involucre

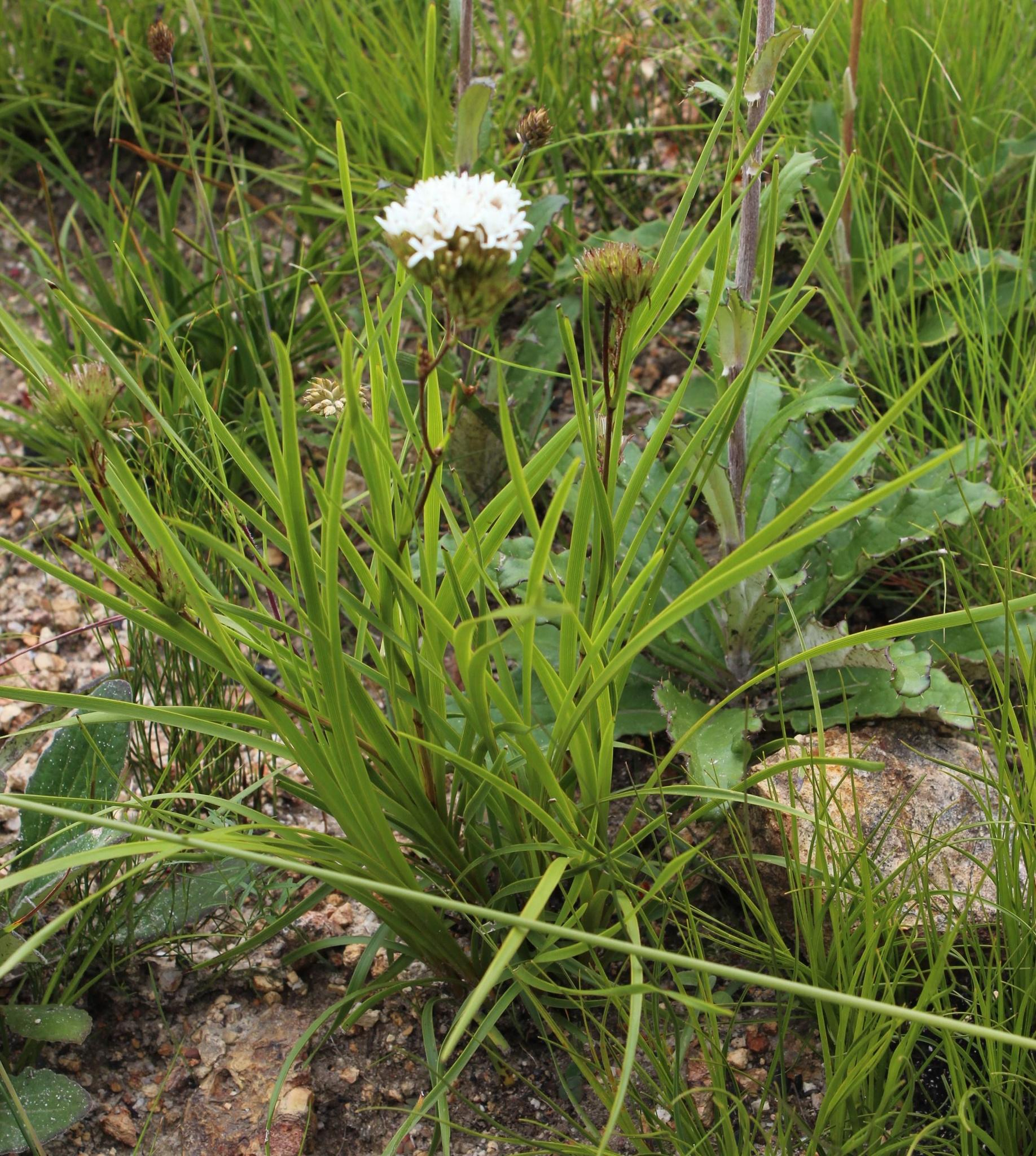
Corymbium cymosum, habit

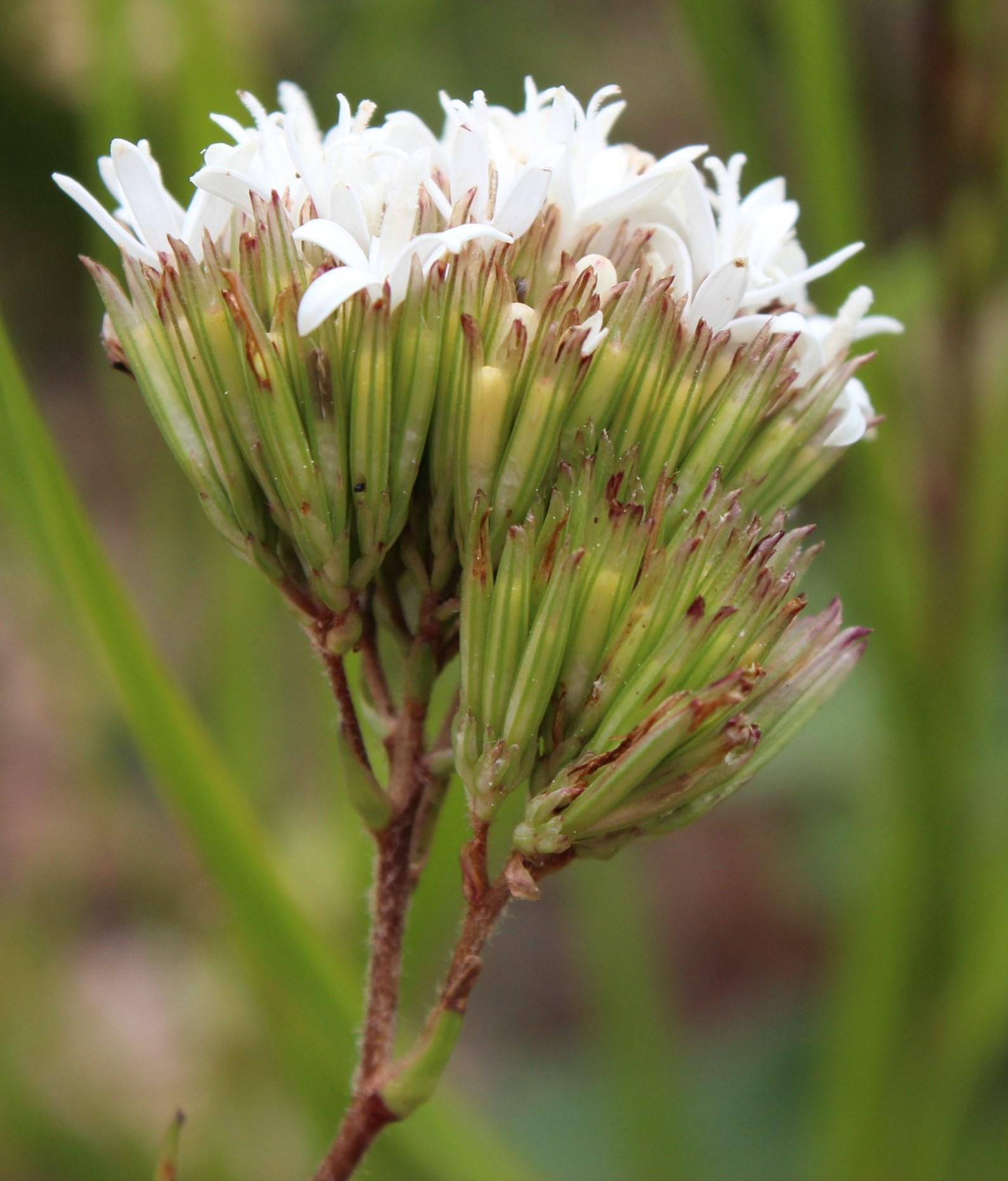
C. cymosum individual heads lack a stalk

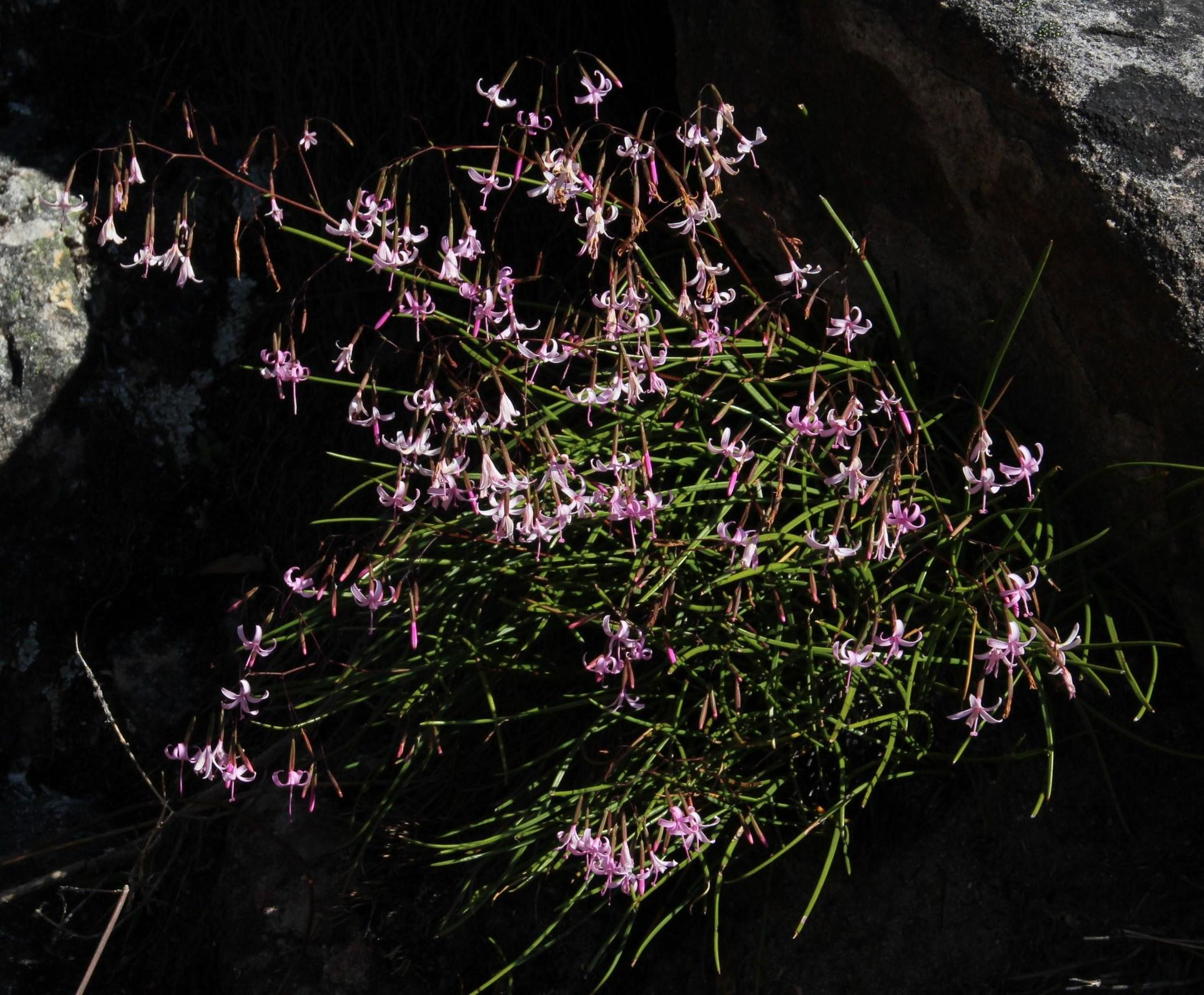
Corymbium laxum, habit

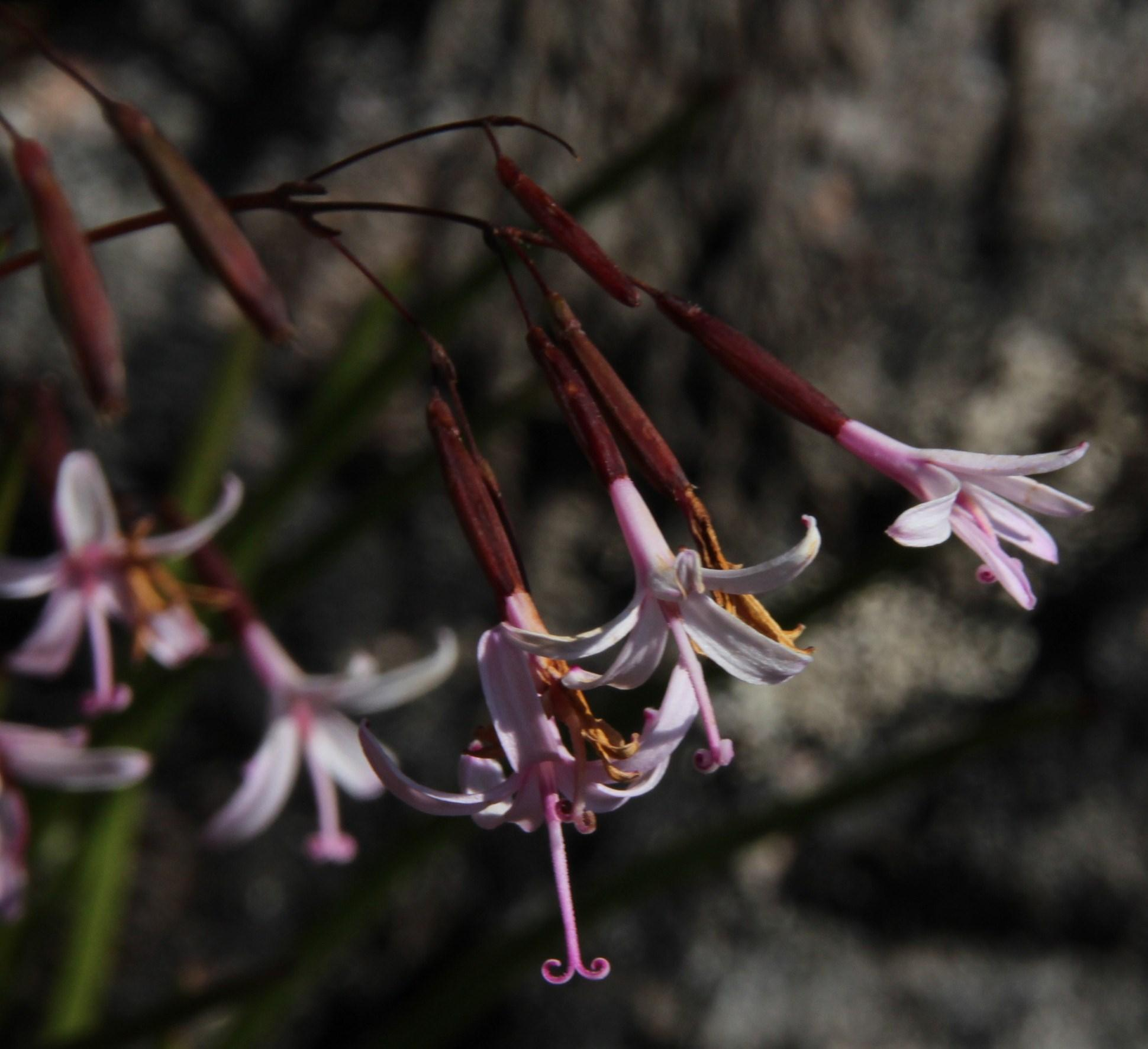
C. laxum heads have a very long stalk

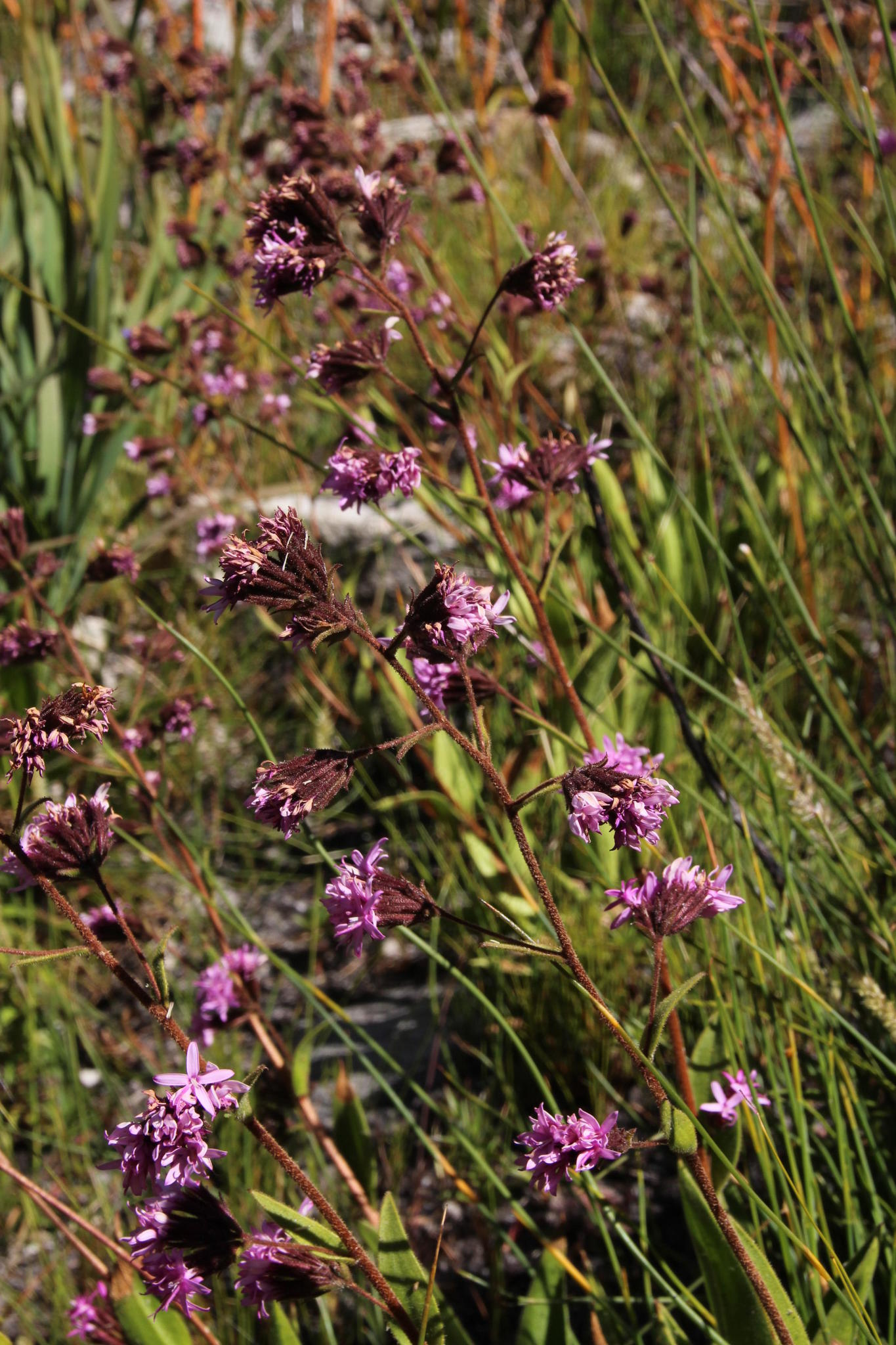
Corymbium congestum, habit

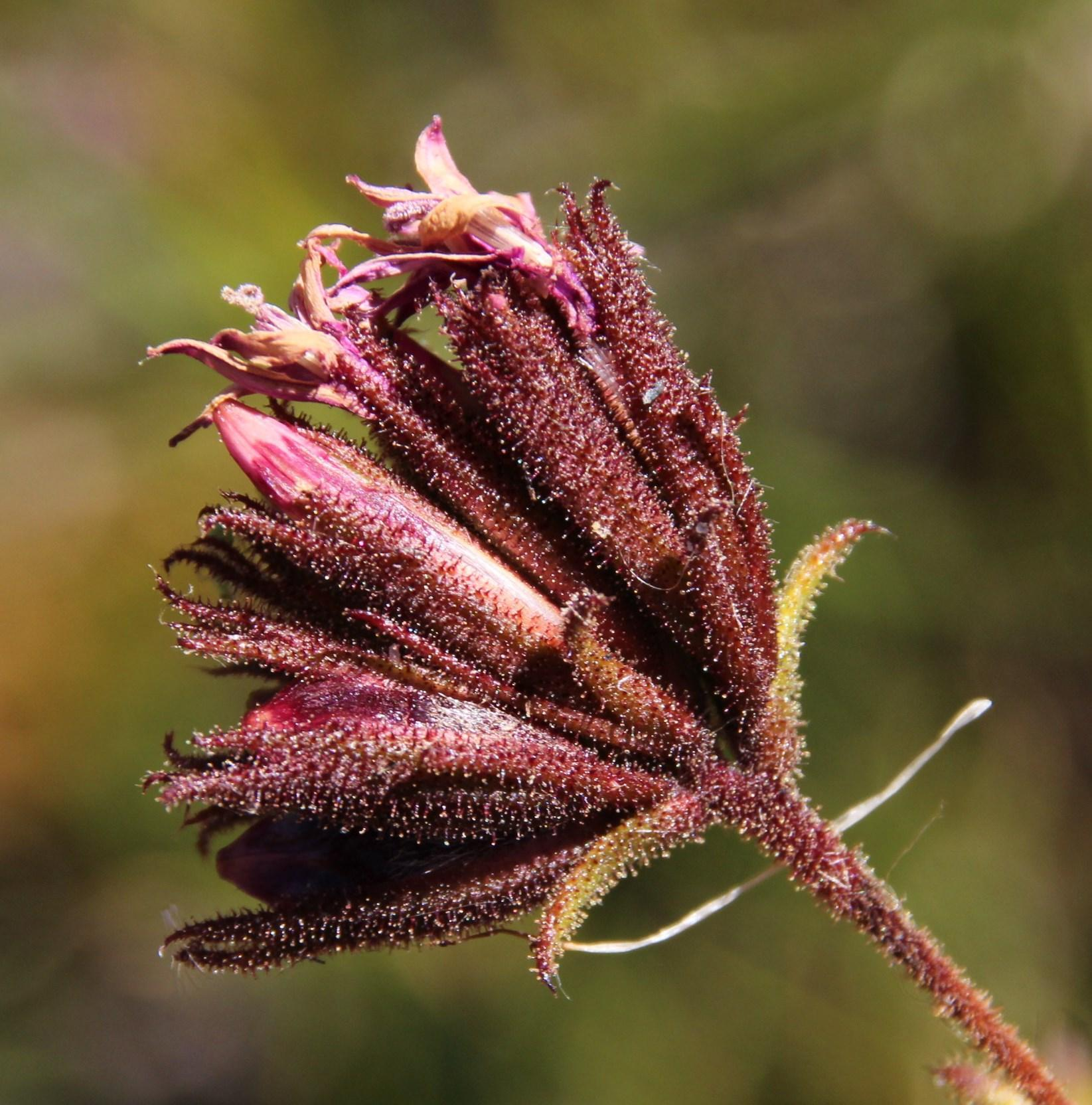
C. congestum with rough and glandular hairs on inflorescence stalk and involucre

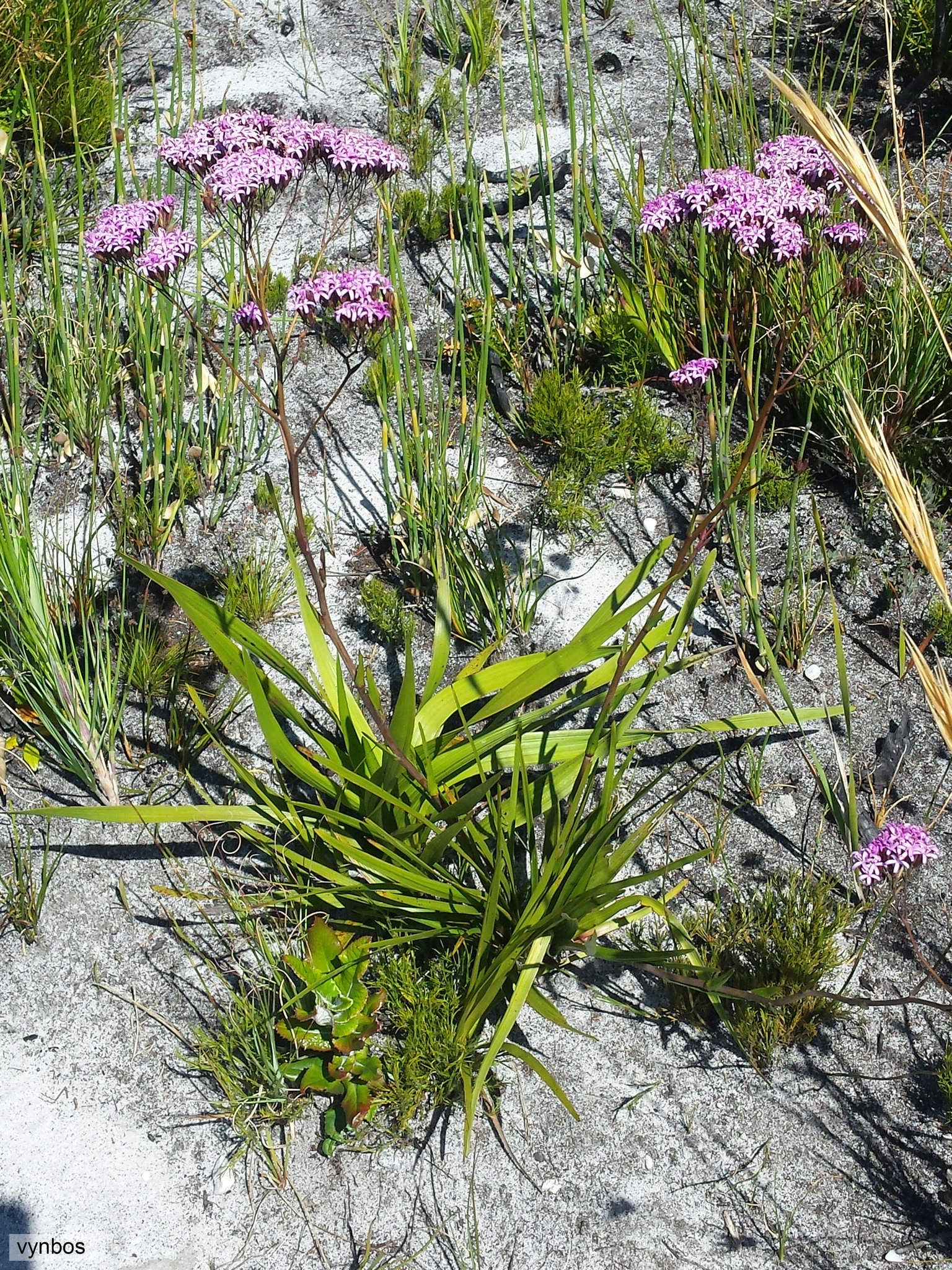
Corymbium glabrum, habit

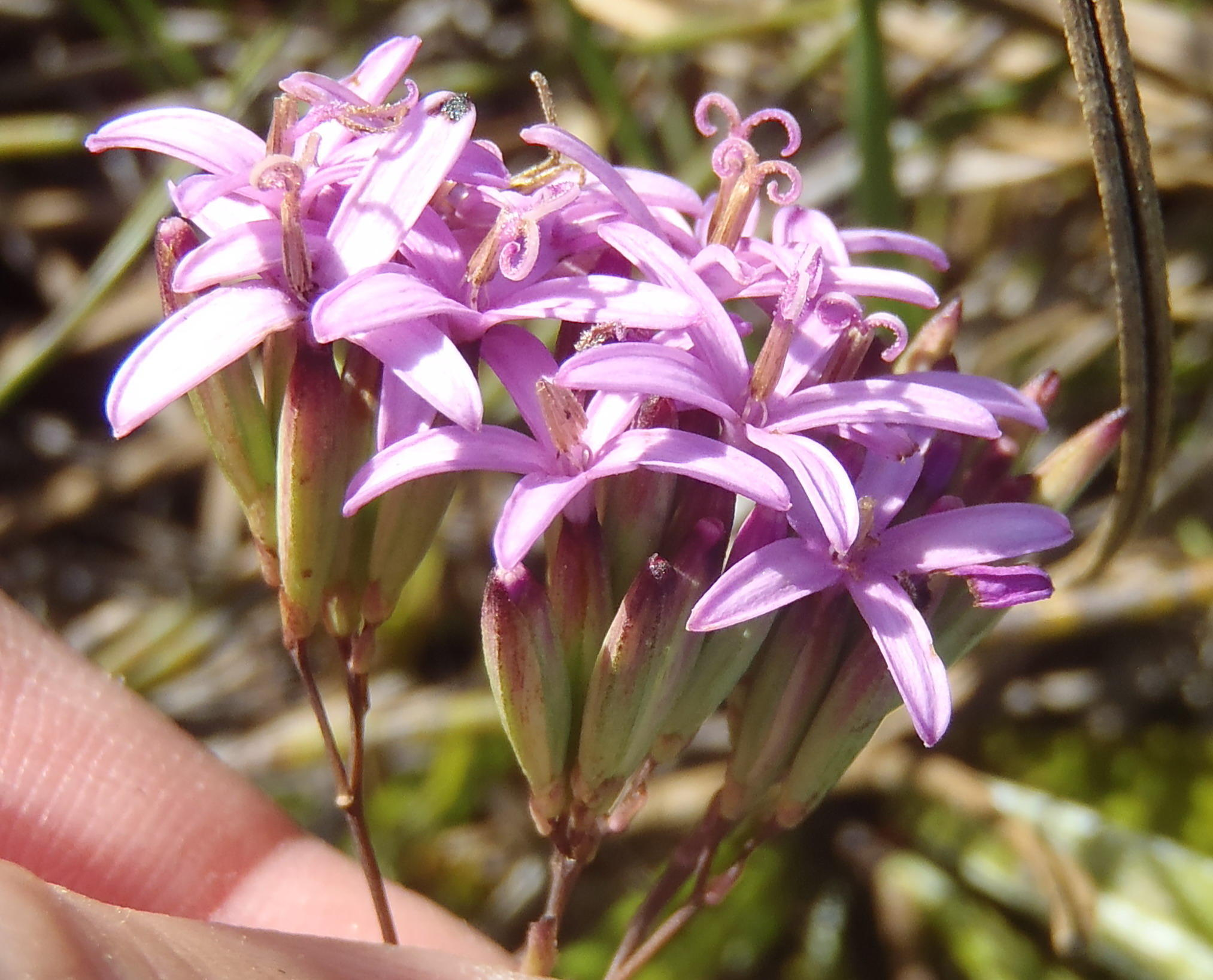
C. glabrum with glabrous inflorescence stalk and involucre

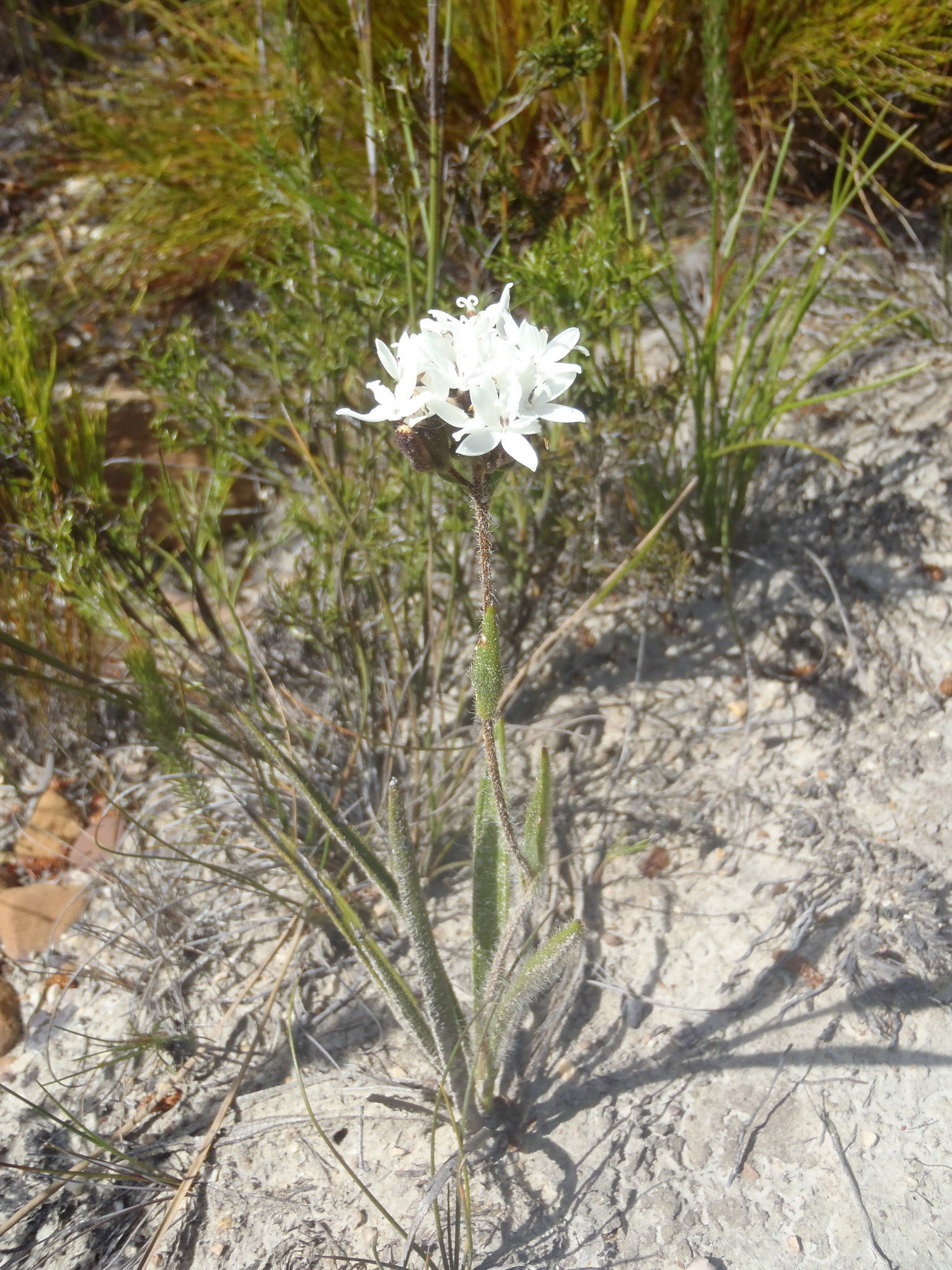
Corymbium villosum, habit

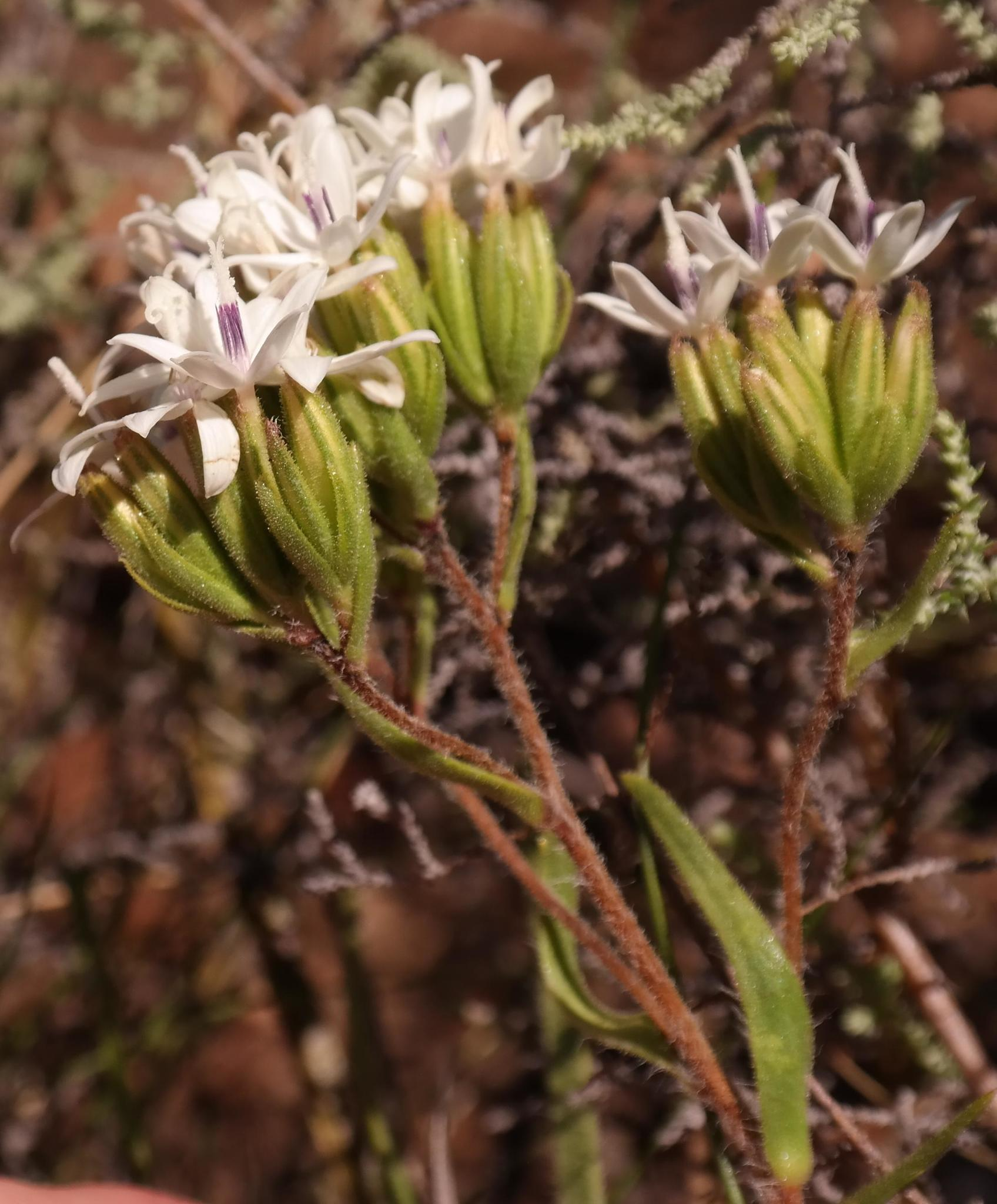
C. villosum, corymb

== Taxonomy ==
In 1680, Polish merchant, artist and naturalist Jacobus Breynius was the first to mention a species of plampers, describing it as Bupleuro affinis planta umbellifera folius liratis, longissimis [hare's-ear related to an umbelliferous plant with the longest lire-shaped leaves] (currently C. glabrum). In 1696, the early English botanist Leonard Plukenet illustrated both C. glabrum and C. africanum in his book Almagestum Botanicum. Plukenet described africanum as having cauliculo scabro [rough branchlets]. The name Corymbium was first proposed by Jan Frederik Gronovius in 1737. In the Hortus Cliffortianus published in 1737, Carl Linnaeus distinguished the typical Corymbium and a variety α. All of these names are invalid since they were publish before 1753, the start of the modern scientific naming.

In his Species Plantarum (1753), Linnaeus recognised only Corymbium africanum. French botanist of Scottish descent, Michel Adanson described the genus Cantarena in 1763. In September 1767, Peter Jonas Bergius described C. scabridum based on Linnaeus' description in the Species Plantarum. In October 1767, Linnaeus distinguished two species, C. glabrum and C. scabrum, abandoning the name C. africanum. Thomas Archibald Sprague in 1940 concluded that C. africanum belongs to the same species and is an older name than C. scabridum. Nicolaas Laurens Burman in 1768 mentioned two species, C. gramineum (now C. africanum subsp. scabridum var. gramineum) and C. africanum. Carl Linnaeus the Younger distinguished two additional species, C. villosum and C. filiforme (now C. africanum subsp. scabridum var. gramineum) in 1781. Two more species, C. hirtum (a synonym of C. villosum) and C. nervosum (a synonym of C. glabrum), have been described by Carl Thunberg in 1794, who also recognised C. glabrum separately. In 1836, Augustin Pyramus de Candolle described for the first time C. congestum, C. cymosum and C. luteum (now C. africanum subsp. scabridum var. gramineum). Danish botanist Christian Friedrich Ecklon mentions but does not describe the name C. hirsutum in 1836 (now C. villosum) in De Candolle's publication. The Irish botanist William Henry Harvey distinguished in 1865 seven species and three varieties, among which the newly introduced names C. latifolium (C. glabrum subsp. glabrum), C. nervosum var. subulifolium, C. scabrum var. filiforme and var. luteum (both now C. africanum subsp. scabridum var. gramineum). John Hutchinson added C. fourcadei (now C. africanum subsp. scabridum var. fourcadei) in 1932, and Robert Harold Compton described C. laxum in 1936. Markötter in 1939, recognized 12 species and two varieties, three of which were new and are upheld today: C. enerve, C. theileri and C. rogersii (now C. glabrum var. rodgersii). Frans M. Weitz, in his 1989 Revision of the genus Corymbium (Asteraceae), recognizes nine species, two subspecies and six varieties, including the new taxa C. elsiae and C. laxum subsp. bolusii.

The name Corymbium has been derived from the Ancient Greek κόρυμβος (kórumbos), meaning a cluster, which refers to the conflorescence, which in some of the species looks like a corymb. The common name in Afrikaans, heuningbossie (honey bush), is a reference to the copious production of nectar of the flowers.

=== Taxonomic history ===
Linnaeus included Corymbium in a group he called Syngenesia Monogamia with Impatiens, Jasione, Lobelia and Viola, because these share an unusual morphology of the fower heads and flowers. In the outlines of his natural system of 1743 however, he positioned it in ‘’Ordo XXI’’, which he would later rename to the Compositae. In 1818, Henri Cassini placed Corymbium in the Vernonieae, which was accepted by later authors including Lessing, De Candolle, Harvey, Bentham, Hoffmann, S.B. Jones, and Weitz. It occurred to Bentham however, that Corymbium has a distinct, particularly long, cylindrical ovary that is densely set with rough hairs, and also has very short style branches. In members of the tribe Vernonieae however, style branches are long and slender, and the ovary is not densely hirsute. Chemical analysis showed that Corymbium contains so-called macrolide diterpenes, but lacks on the other hand sesquiterpene lactones, which are characteristic for the Vernonieae. This has cast further doubt about the correct placement of Corymbium.

=== Phylogeny ===
Based on recent genetic analysis, it is now generally accepted that the subfamily Corymbioideae is sister to the Asteroideae. These two subfamilies, and the Cichorioideae share a deletion of nine base-pairs in the ndhF gene which is not present in any other Asteraceae. Current insights in the relationships of Corymbium to the closest Asterid subfamilies is represented by the following tree.

- - subfamily Pertyoideae
  - - subfamily Gymnarrhenoideae
    - - subfamily Cichorioideae
      - - subfamily Corymbioideae
        - subfamily Asteroideae

== Distribution ==
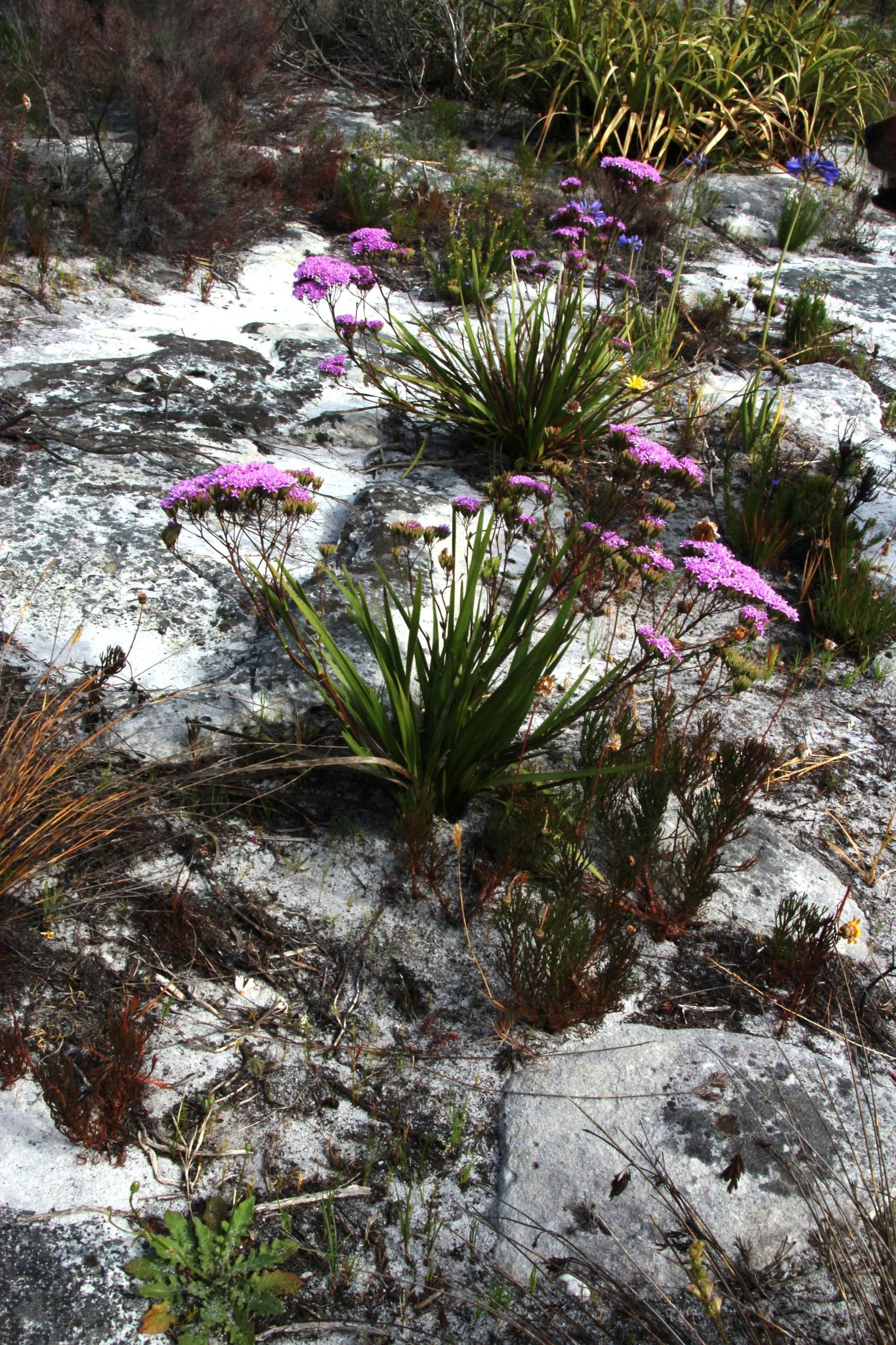
Plampers avoids cover, here C. glabrum at Silvermine, Cape Peninsula

The nine species of plampers are all endemic to the Western Cape and Eastern Cape provinces of South Africa, in particular the Cape Fold Belt and the foreland along the southern coast. They reach the Cedarberg in the north, the Cape Peninsula in the west, and as far as Grahamstown in the east, but do not occur in the Knysna forest. It usually grows on nutrient poor, shallow, quartzite sandy soils in the mountains and on heavy soils from slates, phyllites and granite of the Bokkeveld and Malmesbury Groups. One species grows on shallow calcareous soil on the limestone hills near Bredasdorp and around De Hoop. On the Cape Peninsula, Corymbium species avoid the deep calcareous soils. The species occur from sea level to about 1,850 m (6,070 ft).

== Ecology ==
The species of plampers always grow in open communities with very little cover or at the edge of areas with more cover. They mostly flower during the summer, often about half a year after an overhead fire and for two or three following summers. Later the plants remain predominantly in a vegetative state. Disturbance, such as clearing, may also trigger flowering. The flowers produce copious quantities of nectar, and bees, beetles, wasps and ants, can be seen visiting the flowers, and may be the principal pollinators.

== Conservation ==
Of the seventeen taxa assigned to the genus Corymbium, the risk of extinction for three varieties of C. africanum subsp. scabridum (i.e. var. scabridum, var. fourcadei, and var. gramineum), has not been assessed. The continued survival of eight taxa is regarded to be of least concern: Corymbium africanum subsp. africanum, C. congestum, C. cymosum, C. enerve, C. glabrum var. glabrum, C. glabrum var. rodgersii, C. laxum subsp. laxum, and C. villosum. Two taxa are considered rare: C. laxum subsp. bolusii and C. elsiae. Finally, C. theilerii has been assessed to be critically endangered.
