= NdhF =

InterPro family

The chloroplast NADH dehydrogenase F (ndhF) gene is found in all vascular plant divisions and is highly conserved. Its DNA fragment resides in the small single-copy region of the chloroplast genome, and is thought to encode a hydrophobic protein containing 664 amino acids and to have a mass of 72.9 kDa.

== Application ==
The ndhF fragment has been a very useful tool in phylogenetic reconstruction at a number of taxonomic levels.

== See also ==
- Chloroplast
- Chloroplast DNA
- RuBisCO
- NADPH dehydrogenase (quinone)
